= 1999 NASCAR Winston Cup Series =

American motorsport season

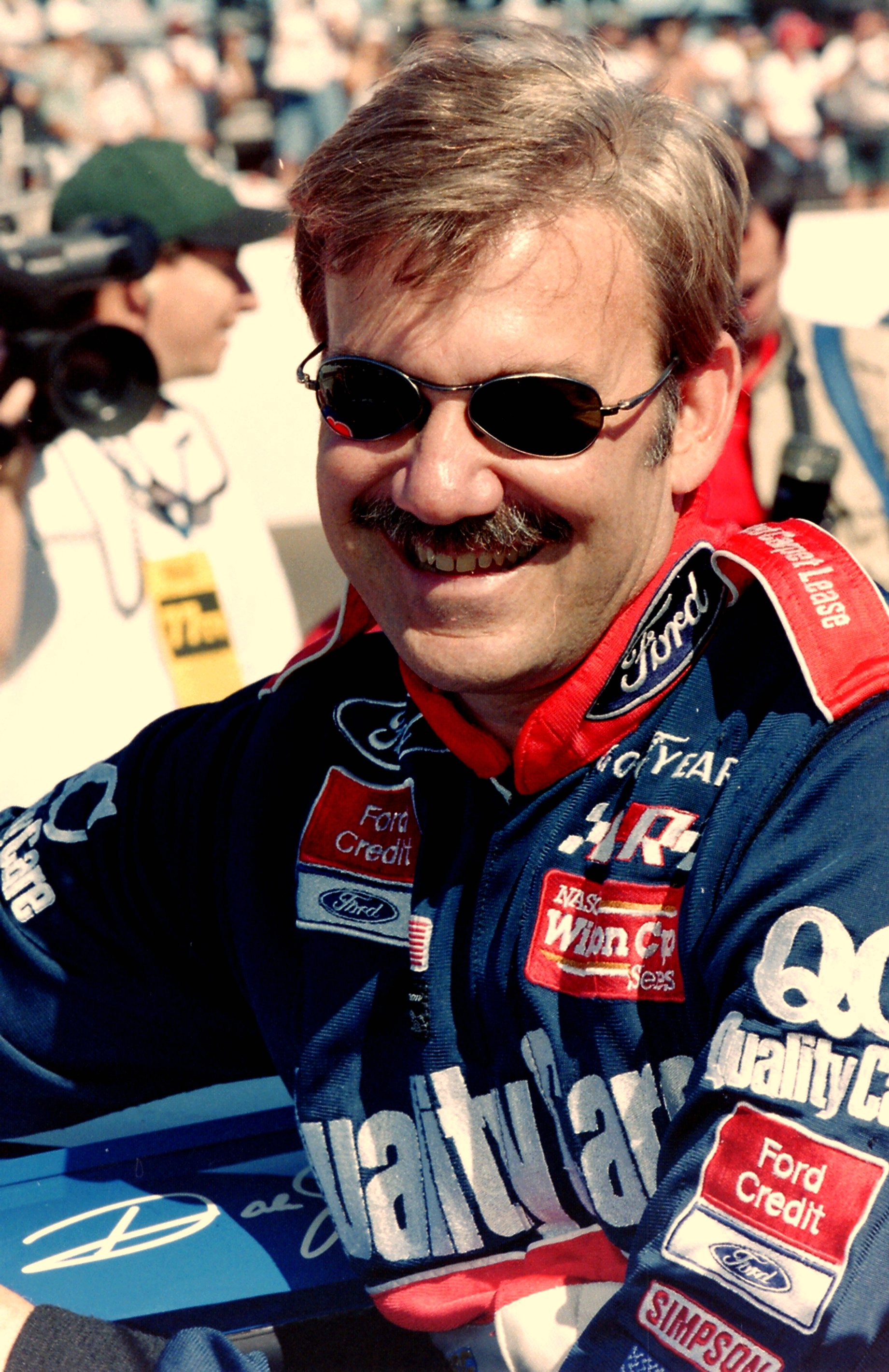
Dale Jarrett, the 1999 Cup Series champion

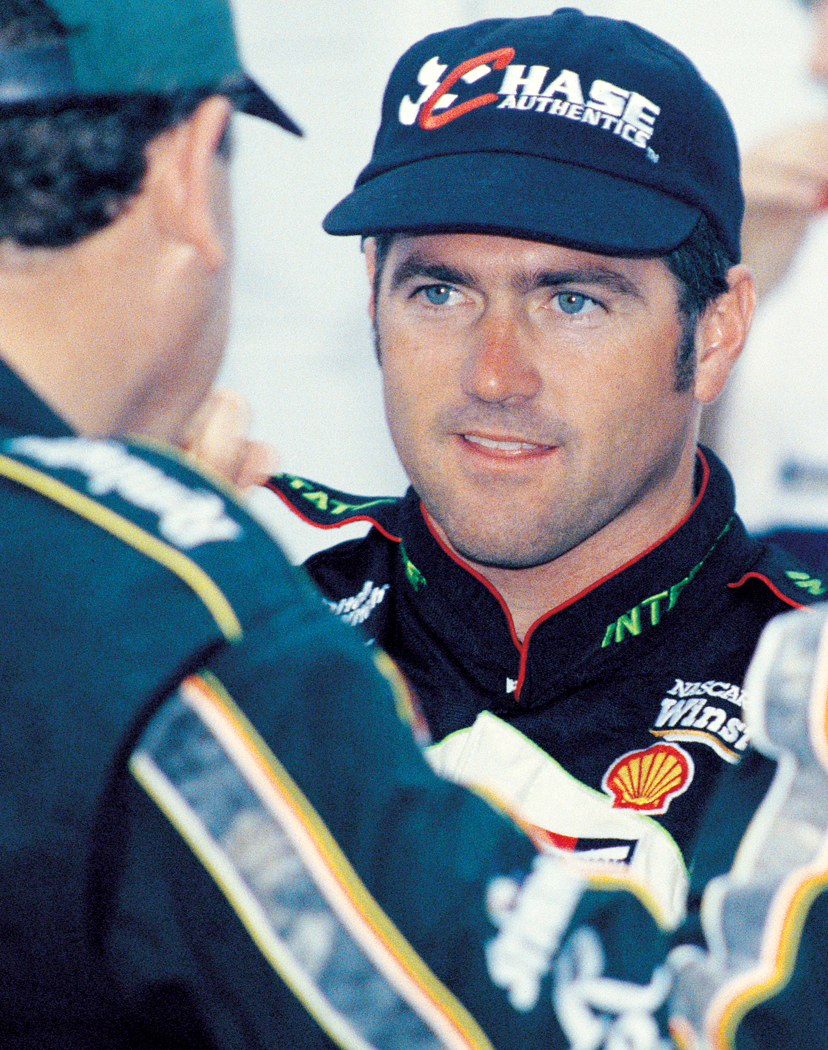
Bobby Labonte finished second in the championship standings.

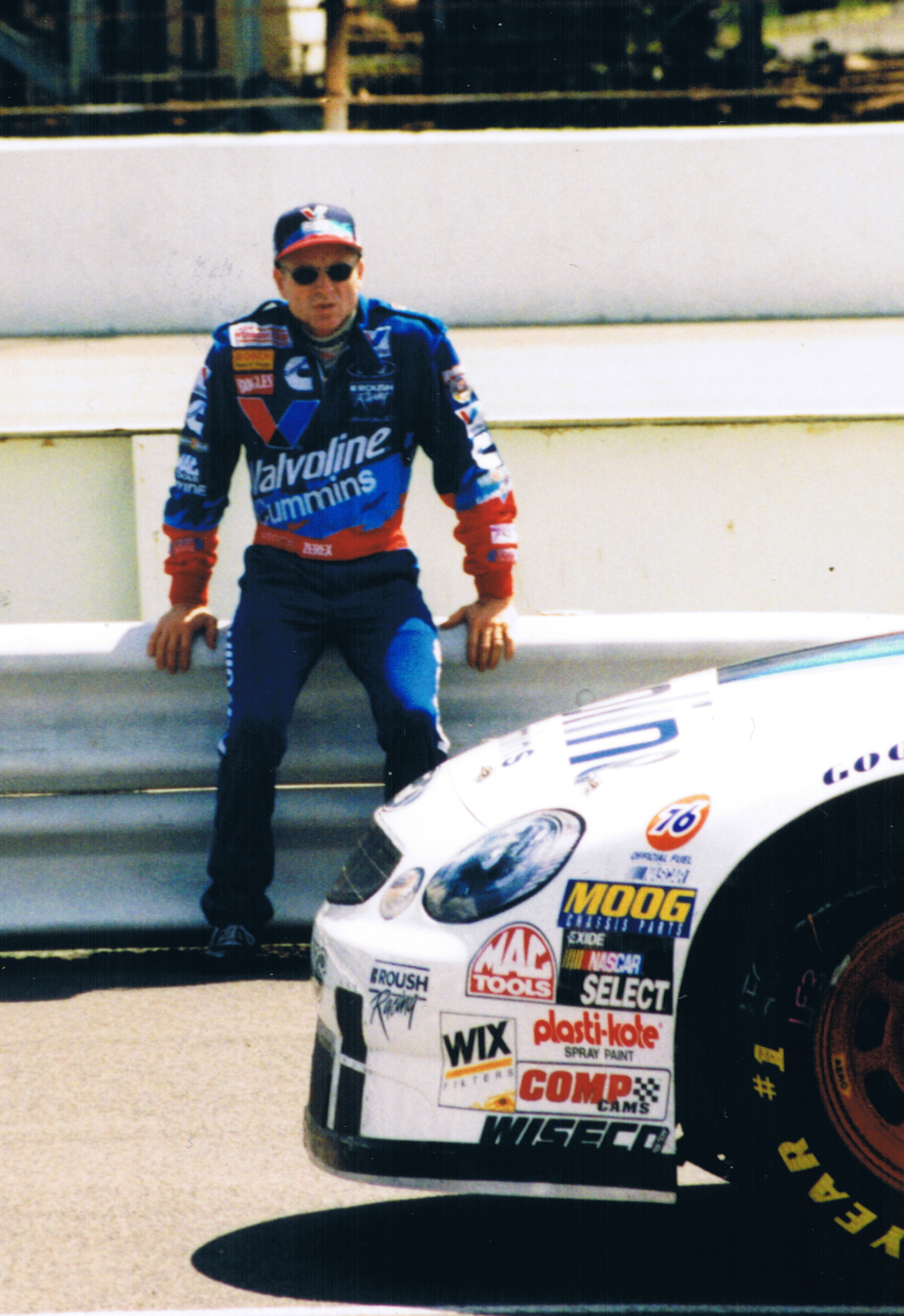
Mark Martin finished third in the championship standings.

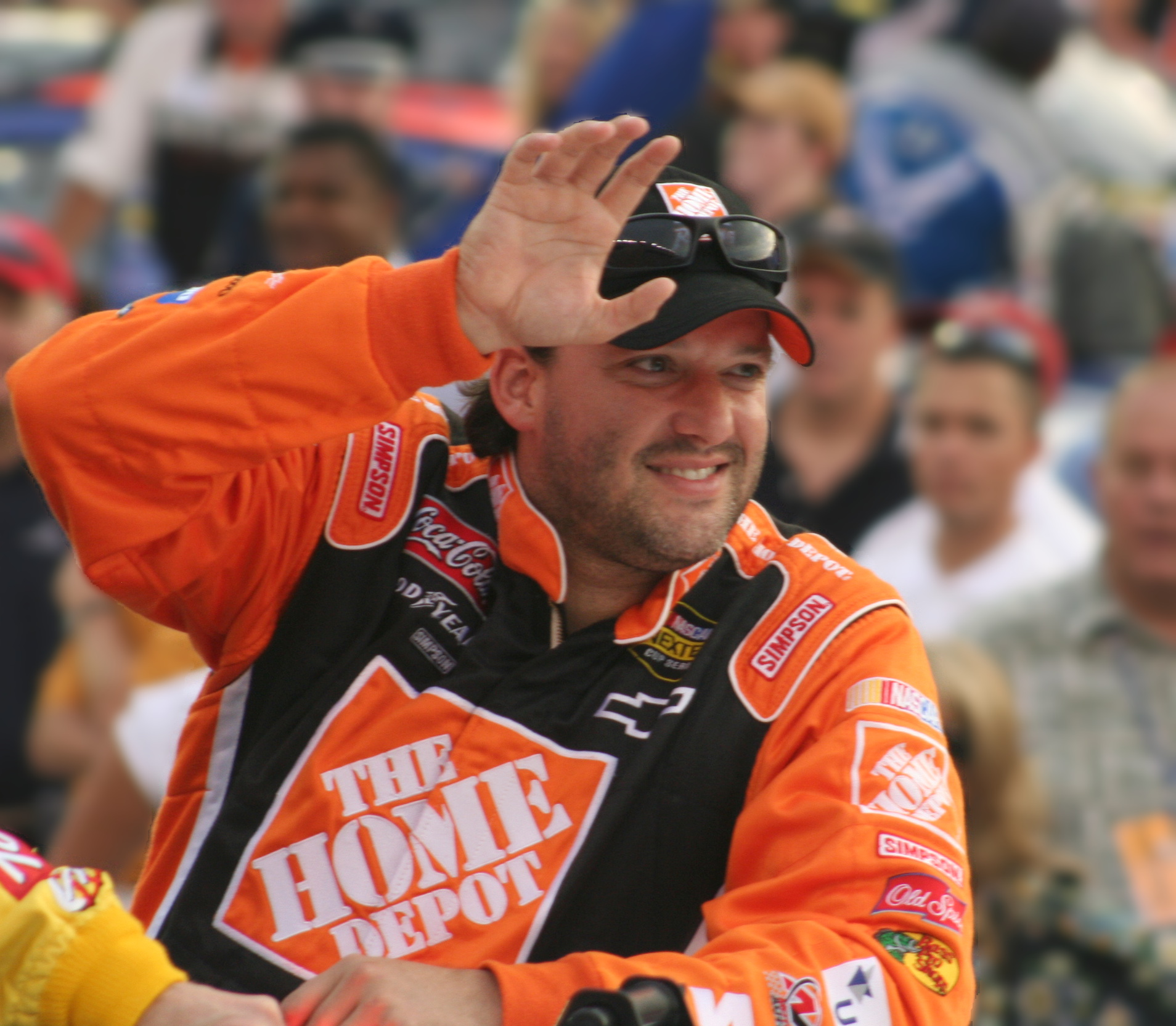
Tony Stewart, (pictured in 2007) won rookie of the year.

The 1999 NASCAR Winston Cup Series was the 51st season of professional Stock car racing in the United States, the 28th modern-era Cup series, and the last Cup season of the 1990s and the 20th century. The season began on Sunday, February 7, and ended on Sunday, November 21. Dale Jarrett, representing Robert Yates Racing, was crowned the champion, while the NASCAR Manufacturers' Championship was won by the Ford drivers with 13 wins and 231 points over second-place Chevrolet who had 12 wins and 210 points and third place Pontiac who had 9 wins and 205 points.

In December 1999, NASCAR announced that starting in February 2001, the Winston Cup Series and Busch Grand National Series would be broadcast live on FOX/FX and NBC/TBS (later TNT).

== Teams and drivers ==
=== Complete schedule ===
Manufacturer	Team	No.	Race driver	Crew chief
Chevrolet	Andy Petree Racing	33	Ken Schrader	Sammy Johns
Chevrolet	Andy Petree Racing	55	Kenny Wallace	Jimmy Elledge
Chevrolet	Dale Earnhardt, Inc.	1	Steve Park	Phillipe Lopez 10; Steve Hmiel 1 Paul Andrews 23
Chevrolet	Hendrick Motorsports	5	Terry Labonte	Andy Graves
Chevrolet	Hendrick Motorsports	24	Jeff Gordon	Ray Evernham 27; Brian Whitesell 7
Chevrolet	Hendrick Motorsports	25	Wally Dallenbach Jr.	Tony Furr
Chevrolet	Joe Bessey Motorsports	60	Geoff Bodine	Jim Long
Chevrolet	Larry Hedrick Motorsports	41	David Green 25	Tim Brewer 1 Mike Hill 2 Donnie Disharoon 31
Chevrolet	Larry Hedrick Motorsports	41	Dick Trickle 4	Tim Brewer 1 Mike Hill 2 Donnie Disharoon 31
Chevrolet	Larry Hedrick Motorsports	41	Derrike Cope 4	Tim Brewer 1 Mike Hill 2 Donnie Disharoon 31
Chevrolet	Larry Hedrick Motorsports	41	Gary Bradberry 1	Tim Brewer 1 Mike Hill 2 Donnie Disharoon 31
Chevrolet	Marcis Auto Racing	71	Dave Marcis 33	Bob Marcis
Chevrolet	Marcis Auto Racing	71	R. K. Smith 1	
Chevrolet	Mattei Motorsports	7	Michael Waltrip	Bobby Kennedy
Chevrolet	Morgan-McClure Motorsports	4	Bobby Hamilton	Charlie Pressley 1 Gary DeHart 33
Chevrolet	Richard Childress Racing	3	Dale Earnhardt	Kevin Hamlin
Chevrolet	Richard Childress Racing	31	Mike Skinner	Larry McReynolds
Chevrolet	Team SABCO	40	Sterling Marlin	Corrie Stott 11; Tony Glover 1 Scott Eggleston 22
Chevrolet	Team SABCO	42	Joe Nemechek	Scott Eggleston 12; Tony Glover 22
Ford	Elliott-Marino Racing; Bill Elliott Racing	94	Bill Elliott	Joe Garone 6 Jerry Pitts 4 Wayne Orme 23; Ernie Elliott 1
Ford	Brett Bodine Racing	11	Brett Bodine	Gere Kennon 20; Rick Gay 14
Ford	Butch Mock Motorsports; Galaxy Motorsports	75	Ted Musgrave 33	Jon Wolfe 20; Greg Ely 14
Ford	Butch Mock Motorsports; Galaxy Motorsports	75	Hut Stricklin 1	Jon Wolfe 20; Greg Ely 14
Ford	Yarborough Burdette Motorsports	98	Rick Mast	Michael McSwain 10; Jerry Pitts 3 Mark Tutor 15; Dan Glauz 6
Ford	Haas-Carter Motorsports	23	Jimmy Spencer	Donnie Wingo
Ford	Haas-Carter Motorsports	66	Darrell Waltrip	Donnie Disharoon 3 Joe Snyder 1 Travis Carter 5 Mark Tutor 6 Phillippe Lopez 18
Ford	Jasper Motorsports	77	Robert Pressley	Newt Moore 11; Charley Pressley 23
Ford	Melling Racing	9	Jerry Nadeau 22	Jeff Buice 13; Newt Moore 17; Kevin Cram 4
Ford	Melling Racing	9	Steve Grissom 3	Jeff Buice 13; Newt Moore 17; Kevin Cram 4
Ford	Melling Racing	9	Rich Bickle 5	Jeff Buice 13; Newt Moore 17; Kevin Cram 4
Ford	Melling Racing	9	Stacy Compton 4	Jeff Buice 13; Newt Moore 17; Kevin Cram 4
Ford	Penske-Kranefuss Racing	2	Rusty Wallace	Robin Pemberton
Ford	Penske-Kranefuss Racing	12	Jeremy Mayfield	Paul Andrews 11; Peter Sospenzo 23
Ford	Robert Yates Racing	28	Kenny Irwin Jr.	Doug Richert 30; Ray Fox 4
Ford	Robert Yates Racing	88	Dale Jarrett	Todd Parrott
Ford	Roush Racing	6	Mark Martin	Jimmy Fennig
Ford	Roush Racing	16	Kevin Lepage	James Ince 7 Tommy Morgan 1 Skip Eyler 11; Pat Tryson 30
Ford	Roush Racing	26	Johnny Benson	Bobby Leslie 10; Pat Tryson 13; Tommy Morgan 11
Ford	Roush Racing	97	Chad Little	Jeff Hammond
Ford	Roush Racing	99	Jeff Burton	Frank Stoddard
Ford	Rudd Performance Motorsports	10	Ricky Rudd	Bill Ingle 4 Dan Stillman 6 Michael McSwain 24
Ford	Wood Brothers Racing	21	Elliott Sadler (R)	Mike Beam
Pontiac	Bahari Racing; Eel River Racing	30	Derrike Cope 22	Dan Glauz 19; Barry Dodson 15
Pontiac	Bahari Racing; Eel River Racing	30	Todd Bodine 9	Dan Glauz 19; Barry Dodson 15
Pontiac	Bahari Racing; Eel River Racing	30	Mike Bliss 2	Dan Glauz 19; Barry Dodson 15
Pontiac	Bahari Racing; Eel River Racing	30	Buckshot Jones (R) 1	Dan Glauz 19; Barry Dodson 15
Pontiac	Bill Davis Racing	22	Ward Burton	Tommy Baldwin Jr.
Pontiac	Joe Gibbs Racing	18	Bobby Labonte	Jimmy Makar
Pontiac	Joe Gibbs Racing	20	Tony Stewart (R)	Greg Zipadelli
Pontiac	MB2 Motorsports	36	Ernie Irvan 21	Ryan Pemberton
Pontiac	MB2 Motorsports	36	Dick Trickle 1	Ryan Pemberton
Pontiac	MB2 Motorsports	36	Jerry Nadeau 12	Ryan Pemberton
Pontiac	Petty Enterprises	43	John Andretti	Robbie Loomis
Pontiac	Petty Enterprises	44	Kyle Petty	Doug Hewitt
Pontiac	Tyler Jet Motorsports	45	Rich Bickle 24	Phil Hammer 7 Bill Ingle 3 James Ince 24
Pontiac	Tyler Jet Motorsports	45	Jack Sprague 1	Phil Hammer 7 Bill Ingle 3 James Ince 24
Pontiac	Tyler Jet Motorsports	45	David Green 9	Phil Hammer 7 Bill Ingle 3 James Ince 24

=== Limited schedule ===
Manufacturer	Team	No.	Race driver	Crew chief	Round(s)
Chevrolet	Barkdoll Racing	73	Ken Bouchard		1
Chevrolet	Dale Earnhardt, Inc.	8	Dale Earnhardt Jr.	Tony Eury Sr.	5
Chevrolet	Highland Timber Racing	08	Harris DeVane		1
Chevrolet	Fast Track Racing	48	Glen Morgan		1
Chevrolet	AC Motorsports	89	Austin Cameron		2
Chevrolet	Gerhart Racing	89	Bobby Gerhart		1
Chevrolet	LJ Racing	91	Steve Grissom	Skip Eyler 8 Joe Falk 1 Nicholas Short 17	4
Chevrolet	LJ Racing	91	Dick Trickle	Skip Eyler 8 Joe Falk 1 Nicholas Short 17	12
Chevrolet	LJ Racing	91	Hut Stricklin	Skip Eyler 8 Joe Falk 1 Nicholas Short 17	1
Chevrolet	LJ Racing	91	Morgan Shepherd	Skip Eyler 8 Joe Falk 1 Nicholas Short 17	1
Chevrolet	LJ Racing	91	Jack Baldwin	Skip Eyler 8 Joe Falk 1 Nicholas Short 17	1
Chevrolet	LJ Racing	91	Tom Baldwin	Skip Eyler 8 Joe Falk 1 Nicholas Short 17	1
Chevrolet	LJ Racing	91	Derrike Cope	Skip Eyler 8 Joe Falk 1 Nicholas Short 17	2
Chevrolet	LJ Racing	91	Tim Fedewa	Skip Eyler 8 Joe Falk 1 Nicholas Short 17	1
Chevrolet	LJ Racing	91	Andy Hillenburg	Skip Eyler 8 Joe Falk 1 Nicholas Short 17	2
Chevrolet	LJ Racing	91	Rich Bickle	Skip Eyler 8 Joe Falk 1 Nicholas Short 17	1
Chevrolet	Marcis Auto Racing	72	Jim Sauter		1
Chevrolet	Ted Christopher Racing	13	Ted Christopher	Kevin Cram	1
Chevrolet	Metcalf Motorsports	70	John Metcalf		1
Chevrolet	Midwest Transit Racing	50	Dan Pardus (R)	John McQueen 3 Jay Born 2 John Monsam13	3
Chevrolet	Midwest Transit Racing	50	Billy Standridge	John McQueen 3 Jay Born 2 John Monsam13	1
Chevrolet	Midwest Transit Racing	50	Ron Hornaday Jr.	John McQueen 3 Jay Born 2 John Monsam13	1
Chevrolet	Midwest Transit Racing	50	Ricky Craven	John McQueen 3 Jay Born 2 John Monsam13	13
Chevrolet	NEMCO Motorsports	87	Ron Fellows	Brian Pattie	1
Chevrolet	Petty-Huggins Racing	84	Stanton Barrett (R)		1
Chevrolet	Petty-Huggins Racing	84	Ken Bouchard		3
Chevrolet	Team SABCO	01	Jeff Green	Bob Temple	2
Chevrolet	Team SABCO	01	Steve Grissom	Bob Temple	2
Chevrolet	Team SABCO	01	Ron Hornaday Jr.	Bob Temple	2
Chevrolet	T.R.I.X. Racing	79	Norm Benning	Ted Walters	1
Chevrolet	T.R.I.X. Racing	79	Andy Belmont	Ted Walters	1
Ford	T.R.I.X. Racing	79	Andy Belmont	Ted Walters	1
Ford	Elliott-Marino Racing	13	Dick Trickle	Wayne Orme	1
Ford	Bud Moore Engineering; Fenley-Moore Motorsports	15	Jeff Green		1
Ford	Bud Moore Engineering; Fenley-Moore Motorsports	15	Derrike Cope		2
Ford	Bud Moore Engineering; Fenley-Moore Motorsports	62	Lance Hooper		1
Ford	CSG Racing	59	Mark Gibson	Tony Gibson	1
Ford	Zali Racing	92	Morgan Shepherd	Brian Bass	1
Ford	Donlavey Racing	90	Mike Wallace	Greg Connor 19; Junie Donlavey 7	1
Ford	Donlavey Racing	90	Mike Harmon (R)	Greg Connor 19; Junie Donlavey 7	0
Ford	Donlavey Racing	90	Morgan Shepherd	Greg Connor 19; Junie Donlavey 7	3
Ford	Donlavey Racing	90	Stanton Barrett (R)	Greg Connor 19; Junie Donlavey 7	9
Ford	Donlavey Racing	90	Ed Berrier	Greg Connor 19; Junie Donlavey 7	7
Ford	Donlavey Racing	90	Loy Allen Jr.	Greg Connor 19; Junie Donlavey 7	1
Ford	Donlavey Racing	90	Hut Stricklin	Greg Connor 19; Junie Donlavey 7	6
Ford	Hover Motorsports	80	Andy Hillenburg		1
Ford	Hover Motorsports	80	Gary Bradberry		2
Ford	Irvan-Simo Racing	14	Randy LaJoie	Jerry Baxter	3
Ford	Irvan-Simo Racing	14	Boris Said	Jerry Baxter	5
Ford	Irvan-Simo Racing	14	Buckshot Jones (R)	Jerry Baxter	1
Ford	Jenn West Motorsports	38	Butch Gilliland		3
Ford	Mansion Motorsports	85	Carl Long		2
Ford	Meacham Racing	04	Andy Belmont		1
Ford	Phoenix Air Racing	61	David Murry	Bob Bissinger	2
Ford	Phoenix Air Racing	61	Bob Strait	Donnie Straight	2
Ford	Pinnacle Motorsports	81	Morgan Shepherd		1
Ford	Roehrig Motorsports	19	Tom Hubert	Mike Bodick	1
Ford	Ron Burns Racing	68	Ron Burns		1
Ford	Roush Racing	17	Matt Kenseth	Robbie Reiser	5
Ford	SBIII Motorsports	58	Ricky Craven	Mike Hillman 25; Jerry Pitts 6	13
Ford	SBIII Motorsports	58	Loy Allen Jr.	Mike Hillman 25; Jerry Pitts 6	3
Ford	SBIII Motorsports	58	Sean Woodside	Mike Hillman 25; Jerry Pitts 6	1
Ford	SBIII Motorsports	58	Hut Stricklin	Mike Hillman 25; Jerry Pitts 6	14
Ford	Standridge Motorsports	47	Billy Standridge	Dave Smith	1
Ford	Triad Motorsports	78	Gary Bradberry	Hut Stricklin	1
Ford	Ultra Motorsports	32	Mike Wallace	Tim Brewer	3
Pontiac	Bill Davis Racing	93	Dave Blaney	Gil Martin	5
Pontiac	Buckshot Racing	00	Buckshot Jones (R)	Tony Barclay	17
Pontiac	Shepherd Racing	05	Morgan Shepherd		4
Pontiac	Golden Gate Racing Team	96	Steve Portenga		1
Pontiac	Joyner-Kersee Racing	19	Tom Hubert	Mike Bodick	2
Pontiac	Joyner-Kersee Racing	19	Paul Gentilozzi		1
Pontiac	Midgley Motorsports	09	Mike Borkowski		1

- Mike Harmon was released just before the Daytona 500 and never drove or attempted any of the races in 1999.

== Schedule ==
No.	Race title	Track	Date
	Bud Shootout Qualifier	Daytona International Speedway, Daytona Beach	February 7
	Bud Shootout	Daytona International Speedway, Daytona Beach	February 7
	Gatorade 125s	Daytona International Speedway, Daytona Beach	February 11
1	Daytona 500	Daytona International Speedway, Daytona Beach	February 14
2	Dura Lube/Big K 400	North Carolina Speedway, Rockingham	February 21
3	Las Vegas 400	Las Vegas Motor Speedway, Las Vegas	March 7
4	Cracker Barrel 500	Atlanta Motor Speedway, Hampton	March 14
5	TranSouth Financial 400	Darlington Raceway, Darlington	March 21
6	Primestar 500	Texas Motor Speedway, Fort Worth	March 28
7	Food City 500	Bristol Motor Speedway, Bristol	April 11
8	Goody's Body Pain 500	Martinsville Speedway, Ridgeway	April 18
9	DieHard 500	Talladega Superspeedway, Talladega	April 25
10	California 500 presented by NAPA	California Speedway, Fontana	May 2
11	Pontiac Excitement 400	Richmond International Raceway, Richmond	May 15
	No Bull 25 Shootout	Lowe's Motor Speedway, Concord	May 22
	Winston Open	Lowe's Motor Speedway, Concord	May 22
	The Winston	Lowe's Motor Speedway, Concord	May 22
12	Coca-Cola 600	Lowe's Motor Speedway, Concord	May 30
13	MBNA Platinum 400	Dover Downs International Speedway, Dover	June 6
14	Kmart 400	Michigan Speedway, Brooklyn	June 13
15	Pocono 500	Pocono Raceway, Long Pond	June 20
16	Save Mart/Kragen 350	Sears Point Raceway, Sonoma	June 27
17	Pepsi 400	Daytona International Speedway, Daytona Beach	July 3
18	Jiffy Lube 300	New Hampshire International Speedway, Loudon	July 11
19	Pennsylvania 500	Pocono Raceway, Long Pond	July 25
20	Brickyard 400	Indianapolis Motor Speedway, Speedway	August 7
21	Frontier at The Glen	Watkins Glen International, Watkins Glen	August 15
22	Pepsi 400 presented by Meijer	Michigan Speedway, Brooklyn	August 22
23	Goody's Headache Powder 500	Bristol Motor Speedway, Bristol	August 28
24	The 50th Pepsi Southern 500	Darlington Raceway, Darlington	September 5
25	Exide NASCAR Select Batteries 400	Richmond International Raceway, Richmond	September 11
26	Dura Lube/Kmart 300	New Hampshire International Speedway, Loudon	September 19
27	MBNA Gold 400	Dover Downs International Speedway, Dover	September 26
28	NAPA Autocare 500	Martinsville Speedway, Ridgeway	October 3
29	UAW-GM Quality 500	Lowe's Motor Speedway, Concord	October 11
30	Winston 500	Talladega Superspeedway, Talladega	October 17
31	Pop Secret Microwave Popcorn 400	North Carolina Speedway, Rockingham	October 24
32	Checker Auto Parts/Dura Lube 500	Phoenix International Raceway, Phoenix	November 7
33	Pennzoil 400 presented by Kmart	Homestead-Miami Speedway, Homestead	November 14
34	NAPA 500	Atlanta Motor Speedway, Hampton	November 21

== Races ==
No.	Race	Pole position	Most laps led	Winning driver	Manufacturer
	Bud Shootout Qualifier	Geoff Bodine	Mike Skinner	Mike Skinner	Chevrolet
	Bud Shootout	Rusty Wallace	Mark Martin	Mark Martin	Ford
	Gatorade 125 No. 1	Jeff Gordon	Jeff Gordon	Bobby Labonte	Pontiac
	Gatorade 125 No. 2	Tony Stewart	Dale Earnhardt	Dale Earnhardt	Chevrolet
1	Daytona 500	Jeff Gordon	Rusty Wallace	Jeff Gordon	Chevrolet
2	Dura Lube/Big K 400	Ricky Rudd	Jeff Burton	Mark Martin	Ford
3	Las Vegas 400	Bobby Labonte	Jeff Burton	Jeff Burton	Ford
4	Cracker Barrel 500	Bobby Labonte	Jeff Gordon	Jeff Gordon	Chevrolet
5	TranSouth Financial 400	Jeff Gordon	Jeff Burton	Jeff Burton	Ford
6	Primestar 500	Kenny Irwin Jr.	Terry Labonte	Terry Labonte	Chevrolet
7	Food City 500	Rusty Wallace	Rusty Wallace	Rusty Wallace	Ford
8	Goody's Body Pain 500	Tony Stewart	Rusty Wallace	John Andretti	Pontiac
9	DieHard 500	Ken Schrader	Dale Earnhardt	Dale Earnhardt	Chevrolet
10	California 500 pres. by NAPA	Jeff Burton	Jeff Gordon	Jeff Gordon	Chevrolet
11	Pontiac Excitement 400	Jeff Gordon	Jeff Burton	Dale Jarrett	Ford
	No Bull 25 Race 1	Steve Park	Mike Skinner	Mike Skinner	Chevrolet
	No Bull 25 Race 2	Tony Stewart	Tony Stewart	Tony Stewart	Pontiac
	Winston Open	Mike Skinner	Tony Stewart	Tony Stewart	Pontiac
	The Winston	Bobby Labonte	Jeff Gordon	Terry Labonte	Chevrolet
12	Coca-Cola 600	Bobby Labonte	Jeff Burton	Jeff Burton	Ford
13	MBNA Platinum 400	Bobby Labonte	Tony Stewart	Bobby Labonte	Pontiac
14	Kmart 400 pres. by Castrol Super Clean	Jeff Gordon	Dale Jarrett	Dale Jarrett	Ford
15	Pocono 500	Sterling Marlin	Dale Jarrett	Bobby Labonte	Pontiac
16	Save Mart/Kragen 350	Jeff Gordon	Jeff Gordon	Jeff Gordon	Chevrolet
17	Pepsi 400	Joe Nemechek	Rusty Wallace	Dale Jarrett	Ford
18	Jiffy Lube 300	Jeff Gordon	Tony Stewart	Jeff Burton	Ford
19	Pennsylvania 500	Mike Skinner	Mike Skinner	Bobby Labonte	Pontiac
20	Brickyard 400	Jeff Gordon	Dale Jarrett	Dale Jarrett	Ford
21	Frontier at the Glen	Rusty Wallace	Jeff Gordon	Jeff Gordon	Chevrolet
22	Pepsi 400 pres. by Meijer	Ward Burton	Jeff Gordon	Bobby Labonte	Pontiac
23	Goody's Headache Powder 500	Tony Stewart	Tony Stewart	Dale Earnhardt	Chevrolet
24	The 50th Pepsi Southern 500	Kenny Irwin Jr.	Jeff Burton	Jeff Burton	Ford
25	Exide NASCAR Select Batteries 400	Mike Skinner	Tony Stewart	Tony Stewart	Pontiac
26	Dura Lube/Kmart 300	Rusty Wallace	Rusty Wallace	Joe Nemechek	Chevrolet
27	MBNA Gold 400	Rusty Wallace	Mark Martin	Mark Martin	Ford
28	NAPA Autocare 500	Joe Nemechek	Mike Skinner	Jeff Gordon	Chevrolet
29	UAW-GM Quality 500	Bobby Labonte	Bobby Labonte	Jeff Gordon	Chevrolet
30	Winston 500	Joe Nemechek	Jeff Gordon	Dale Earnhardt	Chevrolet
31	Pop Secret Microwave Popcorn 400	Mark Martin	Dale Jarrett	Jeff Burton	Ford
32	Checker Auto Parts/Dura Lube 500	John Andretti	Tony Stewart	Tony Stewart	Pontiac
33	Pennzoil 400 pres. by Kmart	David Green	Bobby Labonte	Tony Stewart	Pontiac
34	NAPA 500	Kevin Lepage	Bobby Labonte	Bobby Labonte	Pontiac

=== Bud Shootout ===
The Bud Shootout, an exhibition race for drivers who had won a pole position in the previous season or had won the event before, was held on February 7 at Daytona International Speedway. The starting grid was decided by random draw. Rusty Wallace drew the pole.

Top ten results

1. #6 - Mark Martin
2. #33 - Ken Schrader
3. #18 - Bobby Labonte
4. #31 - Mike Skinner
5. #12 - Jeremy Mayfield
6. #22 - Ward Burton
7. #2 - Rusty Wallace
8. #88 - Dale Jarrett
9. #98 - Rick Mast
10. #28 - Kenny Irwin Jr.

=== Gatorade Twin 125s ===
The Gatorade Twin 125s, a pair of qualifying races for the Daytona 500, were held February 11 at Daytona International Speedway. Jeff Gordon and Tony Stewart won the pole positions for the races, respectively.

Race one: top ten results

1. #18 - Bobby Labonte
2. #24 - Jeff Gordon
3. #99 - Jeff Burton
4. #33 - Ken Schrader
5. #6 - Mark Martin
6. #26 - Jimmy Spencer
7. #7 - Michael Waltrip
8. #77 - Robert Pressley
9. #40 - Sterling Marlin
10. #5 - Terry Labonte

Race two: top ten results

1. #3 - Dale Earnhardt*
2. #12 - Jeremy Mayfield
3. #88 - Dale Jarrett
4. #2 - Rusty Wallace
5. #31 - Mike Skinner
6. #20 - Tony Stewart
7. #16 - Kevin Lepage
8. #4 - Bobby Hamilton
9. #22 - Ward Burton
10. #30 - Derrike Cope
- This was Dale Earnhardt's 10th consecutive Daytona Duel victory, and 12th overall. With his 10th straight victory, Earnhardt won every Gatorade 125 event of the 1990s (1990–1999), becoming the only driver in NASCAR history to win an event for an entire decade.
- This would also be Earnhardt's 28th and final career NASCAR victory at Daytona. Along with his 12 Duel wins, he has 7 wins in the season opener for the Busch Series, 6 wins in the Busch Clash, 2 wins in the Pepsi 400, and a win in the 1998 Daytona 500.

=== Daytona 500 ===
The 1999 Daytona 500 was held February 14 at Daytona International Speedway. Jeff Gordon won the pole. In winning the race as well, he became the first Daytona 500 pole sitter to win the race since Bill Elliott in 1987. This race is known for Gordon's daring three-wide pass on Rusty Wallace and Mike Skinner. Gordon passed Wallace after ducking to the apron, nearly plowing into the damaged car of Ricky Rudd. Skinner jumped to the outside and they raced three-wide for three laps until Dale Earnhardt gave Gordon the needed push. The race was also known for a determined Dale Earnhardt repeatedly trying to pass Jeff Gordon for the lead on the final lap, but Gordon beat Earnhardt to the finish. The race was also marked by a large crash on lap 135 in turn 3 that collected 13 cars and saw Dale Jarrett flip over twice.

Top-ten results:

1. #24 - Jeff Gordon*
2. #3 - Dale Earnhardt
3. #28 - Kenny Irwin Jr.
4. #31 - Mike Skinner
5. #7 - Michael Waltrip
6. #33 - Ken Schrader
7. #44 - Kyle Petty
8. #2 - Rusty Wallace
9. #97 - Chad Little
10. #98 - Rick Mast

Failed to qualify: #50 - Dan Pardus, #59 - Mark Gibson, #72 - Jim Sauter, #48 - Glen Morgan, #81 - Morgan Shepherd, #78 - Gary Bradberry, #73 - Ken Bouchard, #15 - Jeff Green, #80 - Andy Hillenburg, #84 - Stanton Barrett, #47 - Billy Standridge, #41 - David Green, #00 - Buckshot Jones, #91 - Steve Grissom, #13 - Dick Trickle, #79 - Norm Benning.

- In winning the race, Gordon became the first driver since Bill Elliott in 1987 to win the Daytona 500 from the pole.
- This would be the 3rd and final time in his career that Jeff Gordon would win 3 straight NASCAR races (last 2 races of 1998 and 1st race of 1999).
- This was the first Winston No Bull 5 race of the season. Jeff Gordon won the million-dollar bonus.

=== Dura Lube/Big K 400 ===
The Dura Lube/Big K 400 was held February 21 at North Carolina Speedway. Ricky Rudd won the pole.

Top ten results

1. #6 - Mark Martin
2. #88 - Dale Jarrett
3. #18 - Bobby Labonte
4. #99 - Jeff Burton
5. #12 - Jeremy Mayfield
6. #31 - Mike Skinner
7. #5 - Terry Labonte
8. #60 - Geoff Bodine
9. #4 - Bobby Hamilton
10. #2 - Rusty Wallace

Failed to qualify: Derrike Cope (#30), Buckshot Jones (#00), Billy Standridge (#50), Rich Bickle (#45)

- Jeff Gordon suffered a blown engine and finished 39th, his first finish outside the top-10 since Richmond in June 1998. The DNF dropped Gordon from 1st to 11th in points.

=== Las Vegas 400 ===
The Las Vegas 400 was held March 7 at Las Vegas Motor Speedway. Bobby Labonte won the pole. The Burton brothers, Jeff and Ward, both led for a combined 182 of the race's 267 laps. In the end, after a great battle for the lead in the race's closing moments, Jeff would pass brother Ward and hold on for the win.

Top ten results

1. #99 - Jeff Burton
2. #22 - Ward Burton
3. #24 - Jeff Gordon
4. #31 - Mike Skinner
5. #18 - Bobby Labonte
6. #36 - Ernie Irvan
7. #3 - Dale Earnhardt
8. #5 - Terry Labonte
9. #2 - Rusty Wallace
10. #6 - Mark Martin

Failed to qualify: Ted Musgrave (#75), Kyle Petty (#44), Robert Pressley (#77), Ron Hornaday Jr. (#50), Butch Gilliland (#38), Dave Marcis (#71), Morgan Shepherd (#92), Ron Burns (#68), Austin Cameron (#89)

- This was the second Winston No Bull 5 race for 1999.

=== Cracker Barrel 500 ===
The Cracker Barrel 500 was held March 14 at Atlanta Motor Speedway. Bobby Labonte won the pole.

Top ten results

1. #24 - Jeff Gordon
2. #18 - Bobby Labonte
3. #6 - Mark Martin
4. #99 - Jeff Burton
5. #88 - Dale Jarrett
6. #31 - Mike Skinner
7. #36 - Ernie Irvan
8. #22 - Ward Burton
9. #97 - Chad Little
10. #7 - Michael Waltrip

Failed to qualify: Robert Pressley (#77), Steve Grissom (#91), Morgan Shepherd (#90), Harris DeVane (#08)

- This would be Gordon's 35th victory in 100 straight races, dating back to Richmond in March 1996.

=== TranSouth Financial 400 ===
The TranSouth Financial 400 was held March 21 at Darlington Raceway. Jeff Gordon won the pole. This race became infamous for its bizarre finish. Jeff Burton was leading on lap 164 when rain showers suddenly emerged, starting a multi-car wreck that collected Burton. The race never resumed, and Burton managed to limp his damaged car across the start/finish line to win. Jeff Gordon was running 2nd before being passed by Jeremy Mayfield after being involved in the same wreck. Gordon still finished 3rd.

Top ten results

1. #99 - Jeff Burton
2. #12 - Jeremy Mayfield
3. #24 - Jeff Gordon
4. #88 - Dale Jarrett
5. #6 - Mark Martin
6. #20 - Tony Stewart
7. #4 - Bobby Hamilton
8. #22 - Ward Burton
9. #43 - John Andretti
10. #18 - Bobby Labonte*

Failed to qualify: Derrike Cope (#30), Dave Marcis (#71), Rich Bickle (#45)

- Matt Kenseth served as a relief driver for Bobby Labonte in this race after Labonte suffered an injured shoulder in a practice crash. Kenseth climbed into Labonte's car on the first pit stop, and would go on to finish 10th.

=== Primestar 500 ===
The Primestar 500 was held March 28 at Texas Motor Speedway. Kenny Irwin Jr. won the pole.

Top ten results

1. #5 - Terry Labonte*
2. #88 - Dale Jarrett
3. #18 - Bobby Labonte
4. #2 - Rusty Wallace
5. #12 - Jeremy Mayfield
6. #20 - Tony Stewart
7. #99 - Jeff Burton
8. #3 - Dale Earnhardt
9. #40 - Sterling Marlin
10. #21 - Elliott Sadler

Failed to qualify: Dick Trickle (#91), Stanton Barrett (#90), Kyle Petty (#44), Dave Marcis (#71), Ken Bouchard (#84)

- This was Labonte's only NASCAR victory in his home state of Texas, and his last victory until Darlington in September 2003, 4 years and 157 races later.
- Jeff Gordon crashed out on lap 71 and finished 43rd, the first of only three times in his career that Gordon finished last in a 43-car field.

=== Food City 500 ===
The Food City 500 was held April 11 at Bristol Motor Speedway. Rusty Wallace won the pole.

Top ten results

1. #2 - Rusty Wallace*
2. #6 - Mark Martin
3. #88 - Dale Jarrett
4. #43 - John Andretti
5. #99 - Jeff Burton
6. #24 - Jeff Gordon*
7. #75 - Ted Musgrave
8. #44 - Kyle Petty
9. #22 - Ward Burton
10. #3 - Dale Earnhardt

Failed to qualify: Rich Bickle (#45), Stanton Barrett (#90), Derrike Cope (#30), Carl Long (#85)

- Rusty Wallace led 425 of the 500 laps on his way to a dominating victory. This was Wallace's 49th career win, putting him 10th on the NASCAR all time wins list.
- Despite getting involved in a multi-car crash with about 50 laps left, Jeff Gordon rallied to a sixth-place finish due to their being so few cars were left on the lead lap.

=== Goody's Body Pain 500 ===
The Goody's Body Pain 500 was held on April 18 at Martinsville Speedway. Tony Stewart won the pole.

Top ten results

1. #43 - John Andretti*
2. #99 - Jeff Burton
3. #24 - Jeff Gordon
4. #31 - Mike Skinner
5. #6 - Mark Martin
6. #55 - Kenny Wallace
7. #2 - Rusty Wallace
8. #88 - Dale Jarrett
9. #33 - Ken Schrader
10. #44 - Kyle Petty

Failed to qualify: Dave Marcis (#71), Morgan Shepherd (#90), Buckshot Jones (#00)

- This would be the last time the famous Petty #43 would win a Cup Series race until Daytona in July 2014.
- Last win for John Andretti and Petty Enterprises.

=== DieHard 500 ===
The DieHard 500 was held April 25 at Talladega Superspeedway. Ken Schrader won the pole.

Top ten results

1. #3 - Dale Earnhardt
2. #88 - Dale Jarrett
3. #6 - Mark Martin
4. #18 - Bobby Labonte
5. #20 - Tony Stewart
6. #33 - Ken Schrader
7. #55 - Kenny Wallace
8. #9 - Jerry Nadeau
9. #43 - John Andretti
10. #94 - Bill Elliott

Failed to qualify: Ken Bouchard (#84), Dan Pardus (#50), Derrike Cope (#30), Loy Allen Jr. (#90), Dick Trickle (#91)

=== California 500 presented by NAPA ===
The California 500 presented by NAPA was held May 2 at California Speedway. Since qualifying was rained out the lineup was set by owner's points, and Jeff Burton started on the pole.

Top ten results

1. #24 - Jeff Gordon
2. #99 - Jeff Burton
3. #18 - Bobby Labonte
4. #20 - Tony Stewart
5. #88 - Dale Jarrett
6. #22 - Ward Burton
7. #12 - Jeremy Mayfield
8. #25 - Wally Dallenbach Jr.
9. #5 - Terry Labonte
10. #31 - Mike Skinner -1 lap

Failed to qualify: Boris Said (#14), Hut Stricklin (#90), Buckshot Jones (#00), Butch Gilliland (#38)

=== Pontiac Excitement 400 ===
The Pontiac Excitement 400 was held May 15 at Richmond International Raceway. Jeff Gordon won the pole.

Top ten results

1. #88 - Dale Jarrett*
2. #6 - Mark Martin
3. #18 - Bobby Labonte
4. #4 - Bobby Hamilton
5. #2 - Rusty Wallace
6. #42 - Joe Nemechek
7. #44 - Kyle Petty
8. #3 - Dale Earnhardt
9. #22 - Ward Burton
10. #45 - Rich Bickle

Failed to qualify: Buckshot Jones (#00), Dave Marcis (#71), Hut Stricklin (#90)

- After winning this race, and points leader Jeff Burton finishing 37th, Dale Jarrett would take the championship lead and hold it for the rest of the season.

=== The Winston ===
The Winston, NASCAR's all-star race, was held May 22 at Lowe's Motor Speedway. Bobby Labonte won the pole.

Top ten results

1. #5 - Terry Labonte*
2. #20 - Tony Stewart
3. #24 - Jeff Gordon
4. #3 - Dale Earnhardt
5. #12 - Jeremy Mayfield
6. #60 - Geoff Bodine
7. #40 - Sterling Marlin
8. #7 - Michael Waltrip
9. #94 - Bill Elliott
10. #43 - John Andretti
- This was Terry Labonte's second victory in the Winston, and his first since 1988.

=== Coca-Cola 600 ===
The Coca-Cola 600 was held May 30 at Lowe's Motor Speedway. Bobby Labonte won the pole.

Top ten results

1. #99 - Jeff Burton*
2. #18 - Bobby Labonte
3. #6 - Mark Martin
4. #20 - Tony Stewart
5. #88 - Dale Jarrett
6. #3 - Dale Earnhardt
7. #33 - Ken Schrader
8. #22 - Ward Burton -1 lap
9. #31 - Mike Skinner -1 lap
10. #12 - Jeremy Mayfield -1 lap

Failed to qualify: Jeff Green (#01), Dick Trickle (#91), Dave Marcis (#71), Derrike Cope (#30), Ricky Craven (#58), Dan Pardus (#50), Morgan Shepherd (#05), Randy LaJoie (#14), Carl Long (#85)

- Dale Earnhardt Jr. made his NASCAR Winston Cup points race debut in this race, starting 8th and finishing 16th.
- Jeff Burton collected an extra million dollars for winning the third Winston No Bull 5 race of the season.

=== MBNA Platinum 400 ===
The MBNA Platinum 400 was held June 6 at Dover Downs International Speedway. Bobby Labonte won the pole. For the second straight year in this race, fuel strategy did not play out in favor of Jeff Gordon, as he would again have to pit for fuel in the race's closing laps, giving the lead away to Bobby Labonte in this race who would lead the final six laps.

Top ten results

1. #18 - Bobby Labonte
2. #24 - Jeff Gordon
3. #6 - Mark Martin -1 lap
4. #20 - Tony Stewart -1 lap
5. #88 - Dale Jarrett -1 lap
6. #2 - Rusty Wallace -1 lap
7. #26 - Johnny Benson -1 lap
8. #99 - Jeff Burton -1 lap
9. #12 - Jeremy Mayfield -2 laps
10. #28 - Kenny Irwin Jr. -2 laps

Failed to qualify: Darrell Waltrip (#66)*, Buckshot Jones (#00), Hut Stricklin (#90)

- This was Darrell Waltrip's first DNQ since the 1997 UAW-GM Quality 500 at Charlotte. As NASCAR has implemented a maximum limit of the past champion's provisional to a total of eight, Waltrip had exhausted all of his provisionals prior to this race. He would miss a total of seven races this season.
- As of 2024, this is the last Cup race to have only two drivers finish on the lead lap.

=== Kmart 400 ===
The Kmart 400 was held June 13 at Michigan Speedway. Jeff Gordon won the pole.

Top ten results

1. #88 - Dale Jarrett
2. #24 - Jeff Gordon
3. #99 - Jeff Burton
4. #22 - Ward Burton
5. #18 - Bobby Labonte
6. #1 - Steve Park -1 lap
7. #36 - Ernie Irvan -1 lap
8. #43 - John Andretti -1 lap
9. #20 - Tony Stewart -2 laps
10. #6 - Mark Martin -2 laps

Failed to qualify: Dave Marcis (#71), Hut Stricklin (#90), Buckshot Jones (#00)

- This race was run caution-free. It was therefore the fastest NASCAR Cup race at MIS, with Dale Jarrett's average speed being 173.997 mph.
- As of 2024, this would be the last ever non-restrictor plate race to be caution-free. In 2017, NASCAR would make a three-stage format for every race of the season, and at a certain lap at the end of each stage, they would throw the caution flag, thus making it that a race can no longer be caution-free.

=== Pocono 500 ===
The Pocono 500 was held June 20 at Pocono Raceway. Sterling Marlin won the pole.

Top ten results

1. #18 - Bobby Labonte
2. #24 - Jeff Gordon
3. #88 - Dale Jarrett
4. #40 - Sterling Marlin
5. #6 - Mark Martin
6. #20 - Tony Stewart
7. #3 - Dale Earnhardt
8. #36 - Ernie Irvan
9. #12 - Jeremy Mayfield
10. #4 - Bobby Hamilton

Failed to qualify: Hut Stricklin (#90), Loy Allen Jr. (#58), Derrike Cope (#30)

- This race marked the last Top 10 for Ernie Irvan.

=== Save Mart/Kragen 350 ===
The Save Mart/Kragen 350 was held June 27 at Sears Point Raceway. Jeff Gordon won the pole.

Top ten results

1. #24 - Jeff Gordon
2. #6 - Mark Martin
3. #43 - John Andretti
4. #2 - Rusty Wallace
5. #23 - Jimmy Spencer
6. #88 - Dale Jarrett
7. #12 - Jeremy Mayfield
8. #44 - Kyle Petty
9. #3 - Dale Earnhardt
10. #7 - Michael Waltrip

Failed to qualify: R. K. Smith (#71), Austin Cameron (#89), Sean Woodside (#58), John Metcalf (#70), Mike Borkowski (#09), Boris Said (#14), Steve Portenga (#96), David Murry (#61)

- Jeff Gordon won despite hard charges by Mark Martin and being extremely sick. This was also Gordon's second straight victory at Sears Point Raceway and his fourth straight road course victory.
- Former Formula 1 driver Érik Comas planned to attempt his Cup Series debut for Donlavey Racing, but the deal fell through and Donlavey did not attempt this race.

=== Pepsi 400 ===
The Pepsi 400 was held July 3 at Daytona International Speedway. Joe Nemechek won the pole.

Top ten results

1. #88 - Dale Jarrett
2. #3 - Dale Earnhardt
3. #99 - Jeff Burton
4. #31 - Mike Skinner
5. #18 - Bobby Labonte
6. #20 - Tony Stewart
7. #22 - Ward Burton
8. #4 - Bobby Hamilton
9. #36 - Ernie Irvan
10. #5 - Terry Labonte

Failed to qualify: Derrike Cope (#30), Hut Stricklin (#91), Ken Bouchard (#84), Robert Pressley (#77), Stanton Barrett (#90)

=== Jiffy Lube 300 ===
The Jiffy Lube 300 was held July 11 at New Hampshire International Speedway. Jeff Gordon won the pole.

Top ten results

1. #99 - Jeff Burton
2. #55 - Kenny Wallace
3. #24 - Jeff Gordon
4. #88 - Dale Jarrett
5. #94 - Bill Elliott
6. #6 - Mark Martin
7. #25 - Wally Dallenbach Jr.
8. #3 - Dale Earnhardt
9. #23 - Jimmy Spencer
10. #20 - Tony Stewart

Failed to qualify: Robert Pressley (#77), Derrike Cope (#30), David Green (#41), Dave Marcis (#71)

=== Pennsylvania 500 ===
The Pennsylvania 500 was held July 25 at Pocono Raceway. Mike Skinner won the pole.

Top ten results

1. #18 - Bobby Labonte*
2. #88 - Dale Jarrett
3. #6 - Mark Martin
4. #20 - Tony Stewart
5. #25 - Wally Dallenbach Jr.
6. #5 - Terry Labonte
7. #45 - Rich Bickle
8. #1 - Steve Park
9. #3 - Dale Earnhardt
10. #31 - Mike Skinner

Failed to qualify: Derrike Cope (#30), Morgan Shepherd (#91)

- With this victory, Bobby Labonte completed a rare sweep of races at Pocono Raceway in one season.
- Elliott Sadler injured his left foot during qualifying. Despite having Morgan Shepherd on standby, Sadler would run the full race.
- This was the final race where Ken Squier was the play-by-play announcer.

=== Brickyard 400 ===
The Brickyard 400 was held August 7 at Indianapolis Motor Speedway. Jeff Gordon won the pole.

Top ten results

1. #88 - Dale Jarrett*
2. #18 - Bobby Labonte
3. #24 - Jeff Gordon
4. #6 - Mark Martin
5. #99 - Jeff Burton
6. #22 - Ward Burton
7. #20 - Tony Stewart
8. #2 - Rusty Wallace
9. #10 - Ricky Rudd
10. #3 - Dale Earnhardt

Failed to qualify: Rich Bickle (#45), Boris Said (#14), Brett Bodine (#11), Dick Trickle (#91), Steve Grissom (#01), Morgan Shepherd (#05), Jeff Davis/Lance Hooper (#62), Stanton Barrett (#90), Mike Wallace (#32), Gary Bradberry (#80), Buckshot Jones (#00), Bob Strait (#61)

- Dale Jarrett's victory came with redemption for last year's race, after running out of fuel took him out of contention.
- Jarrett's victory would be the last for Ford in the Brickyard 400 until Brad Keselowski's victory in 2018, nearly 20 years later.

=== Frontier at The Glen ===
The Frontier at The Glen was held August 15 at Watkins Glen International. Rusty Wallace won the pole. Jeff Gordon would lead 55 of the race's 90 laps on his way to his third straight win at Watkins Glen and his fifth straight road course victroy.

Top ten results

1. #24 - Jeff Gordon
2. #87 - Ron Fellows*
3. #2 - Rusty Wallace
4. #88 - Dale Jarrett
5. #9 - Jerry Nadeau
6. #20 - Tony Stewart
7. #25 - Wally Dallenbach Jr.
8. #44 - Kyle Petty
9. #31 - Mike Skinner
10. #6 - Mark Martin

Failed to qualify: Robert Pressley (#77), Derrike Cope (#30), Paul Gentilozzi (#19), Jack Baldwin (#91), Hut Stricklin (#58), Dave Marcis (#71)

- This would be the 47th and final career victory for Ray Evernham as a crew chief.
- This was Ernie Irvan's last NASCAR Winston Cup race.
- Ron Fellows finished a career-best 2nd-place finish in this race.

=== Pepsi 400 presented by Meijer ===
The Pepsi 400 presented by Meijer was held August 22 at Michigan Speedway. Ward Burton won the pole.

Top ten results

1. #18 - Bobby Labonte
2. #24 - Jeff Gordon
3. #20 - Tony Stewart
4. #88 - Dale Jarrett
5. #3 - Dale Earnhardt
6. #97 - Chad Little
7. #6 - Mark Martin
8. #23 - Jimmy Spencer
9. #58 - Hut Stricklin
10. #43 - John Andretti

Failed to qualify: Derrike Cope (#30), Stanton Barrett (#90), Darrell Waltrip (#66), Brett Bodine (#11), Tom Hubert (#19)

- Dick Trickle subbed for Ernie Irvan in this race after Irvan suffered a hard crash during Busch Series practice. After this race, Jerry Nadeau would drive the #36 for the remainder of the season.
- Also during the race weekend Team SABCO and Joe Nemechek announced that they would part ways at the end of the season.

=== Goody's Headache Powder 500 ===
The Goody's Headache Powder 500 was held August 28 at Bristol Motor Speedway. Tony Stewart won the pole.

Top ten results

1. #3 - Dale Earnhardt*
2. #23 - Jimmy Spencer
3. #10 - Ricky Rudd
4. #24 - Jeff Gordon
5. #20 - Tony Stewart
6. #6 - Mark Martin
7. #40 - Sterling Marlin
8. #5 - Terry Labonte -1 lap
9. #22 - Ward Burton -1 lap
10. #33 - Ken Schrader -1 lap

Failed to qualify: Rich Bickle (#45), Dick Trickle (#91)

- This race came under some controversy when on the last lap, Dale Earnhardt spun out leader Terry Labonte, who collected Ricky Rudd and Stewart. Earnhardt was booed as he pulled into victory lane. On lap 490, Earnhardt would inherit the lead after leader Terry Labonte spun after the caution flag was just brought out with 9 laps to go. Because of the low number of lead lap cars left in the race, Terry was able to pit for tires during the caution flag and make a hard charge to the front when the race was back green. Labonte got by Earnhardt for the lead coming to the white flag then Earnhardt got into him in turns 1 and 2.
- Earnhardt's 26th-place starting position marked the lowest starting position for a winning driver in this race.

=== Pepsi Southern 500 ===
The 50th Pepsi Southern 500 was held September 5 at Darlington Raceway. Kenny Irwin Jr. won the pole.

Top ten results

1. #99 - Jeff Burton*
2. #22 - Ward Burton
3. #12 - Jeremy Mayfield
4. #6 - Mark Martin
5. #16 - Kevin Lepage
6. #42 - Joe Nemechek
7. #4 - Bobby Hamilton
8. #2 - Rusty Wallace
9. #33 - Ken Schrader
10. #1 - Steve Park

Failed to qualify: Todd Bodine (#30), Stanton Barrett (#90)

- Jeff Burton once again collected one million dollars for his victory in the fourth Winston No Bull 5 race of 1999.
- The race was halted on lap 270 due to rain.
- During the weekend of this race, Ernie Irvan announced his immediate retirement from racing due to injuries he suffered at Michigan the previous month.

=== Exide NASCAR Select Batteries 400 ===
The Exide NASCAR Select Batteries 400 was held September 11 at Richmond International Raceway. Mike Skinner won the pole.

Top ten results

1. #20 - Tony Stewart*
2. #18 - Bobby Labonte
3. #88 - Dale Jarrett
4. #40 - Sterling Marlin
5. #28 - Kenny Irwin Jr.
6. #3 - Dale Earnhardt
7. #4 - Bobby Hamilton
8. #75 - Ted Musgrave
9. #43 - John Andretti -1 lap
10. #8 - Dale Earnhardt Jr. -1 lap

Failed to qualify: Jack Sprague (#45), Dave Marcis (#71), Hut Stricklin (#58), Stanton Barrett (#90), Tom Baldwin (#91)

- This was Tony Stewart's first NASCAR Winston Cup win. Stewart led 333 of the race's 400 laps.
- Stewart would be the first rookie since Davey Allison in 1987 to win a NASCAR Cup Series points race.

=== Dura Lube/Kmart 300 ===
The Dura Lube/Kmart 300 was held September 19 at New Hampshire International Speedway. Rusty Wallace won the pole.

Top ten results

1. #42 - Joe Nemechek*
2. #20 - Tony Stewart
3. #18 - Bobby Labonte
4. #99 - Jeff Burton
5. #24 - Jeff Gordon
6. #2 - Rusty Wallace
7. #26 - Johnny Benson
8. #22 - Ward Burton
9. #98 - Rick Mast
10. #28 - Kenny Irwin Jr.

Failed to qualify: Darrell Waltrip (#66), Derrike Cope (#91), Dick Trickle (#41), Andy Belmont (#79)

- This was Nemechek's first NASCAR Cup Series victory, and the first for owner Felix Sabates since Dover in June 1995.

=== MBNA Gold 400 ===
The MBNA Gold 400 was held September 26 at Dover Downs International Speedway. Rusty Wallace won the pole.

Top ten results

1. #6 - Mark Martin
2. #20 - Tony Stewart
3. #88 - Dale Jarrett
4. #17 - Matt Kenseth*
5. #18 - Bobby Labonte
6. #99 - Jeff Burton
7. #97 - Chad Little -1 lap
8. #3 - Dale Earnhardt -1 lap
9. #1 - Steve Park -1 lap
10. #28 - Kenny Irwin Jr. -1 lap

Failed to qualify: Dick Trickle (#41), Todd Bodine (#30), Darrell Waltrip (#66)*, Derrike Cope (#91), Andy Belmont (#79)

- First career top-5 for Matt Kenseth.
- First time in his career that Darrell Waltrip would fail to qualify for back-to-back races.

=== NAPA AutoCare 500 ===
The NAPA AutoCare 500 was held October 3 at Martinsville Speedway. Joe Nemechek won the pole.

Top ten results

1. #24 - Jeff Gordon*
2. #3 - Dale Earnhardt
3. #60 - Geoff Bodine
4. #2 - Rusty Wallace
5. #55 - Kenny Wallace
6. #31 - Mike Skinner
7. #44 - Kyle Petty
8. #18 - Bobby Labonte
9. #99 - Jeff Burton -1 lap
10. #88 - Dale Jarrett -1 lap

Failed to qualify: Ron Hornaday Jr. (#01), Dick Trickle (#41), Tim Fedewa (#91), Morgan Shepherd (#05)

- Prior to this race, it was announced that Jeff Gordon's crew chief Ray Evernham had left Hendrick Motorsports to oversee Dodge's return to NASCAR in 2001. Brian Whitesell would be Gordon's crew chief for the remainder of the season.

=== UAW-GM Quality 500 ===
The UAW-GM Quality 500 at Lowe's Motor Speedway was scheduled for October 10 but was held October 11 due to rain. Bobby Labonte won the pole.

Top ten results

1. #24 - Jeff Gordon*
2. #18 - Bobby Labonte
3. #31 - Mike Skinner
4. #6 - Mark Martin
5. #22 - Ward Burton
6. #12 - Jeremy Mayfield
7. #88 - Dale Jarrett
8. #2 - Rusty Wallace -1 lap
9. #16 - Kevin Lepage -1 lap
10. #1 - Steve Park -1 lap

Failed to qualify: Darrell Waltrip (#66), Dave Marcis (#71), Ed Berrier (#90), Gary Bradberry (#80), Hut Stricklin (#58), Andy Hillenburg (#91)

- This victory made 1999 the 5th consecutive year that Jeff Gordon won 7+ races in a season, a NASCAR modern-era record. As of 2024, Gordon is so far still the only driver in NASCAR history to accomplish this feat.
- This was Gordon's 49th career victory, tying him with Rusty Wallace for 10th on the NASCAR all-time wins list.

=== Winston 500 ===
The Winston 500 was held October 17 at Talladega Superspeedway. Joe Nemechek won the pole.

Top ten results

1. #3 - Dale Earnhardt*
2. #88 - Dale Jarrett
3. #10 - Ricky Rudd
4. #22 - Ward Burton
5. #55 - Kenny Wallace
6. #20 - Tony Stewart
7. #18 - Bobby Labonte
8. #99 - Jeff Burton
9. #4 - Bobby Hamilton
10. #28 - Kenny Irwin Jr.

Failed to qualify: Bobby Gerhart (#89), Robert Pressley (#77), Darrell Waltrip (#66), Hut Stricklin (#58)

- As of 2024, Dale Earnhardt is the only driver in NASCAR history to pull off the season sweep at Talladega twice. His other season sweep was back in 1990.
- This was the final Winston No Bull 5 race of 1999. The top five finishing order would be eligible for the bonus at the 2000 Daytona 500.

=== Pop Secret Microwave Popcorn 400 ===
The Pop Secret Microwave Popcorn 400 was held October 24 at North Carolina Speedway. Mark Martin won the pole.

Top ten results

1. #99 - Jeff Burton*
2. #22 - Ward Burton
3. #18 - Bobby Labonte
4. #88 - Dale Jarrett
5. #2 - Rusty Wallace
6. #6 - Mark Martin
7. #43 - John Andretti
8. #40 - Sterling Marlin
9. #12 - Jeremy Mayfield -1 lap
10. #4 - Bobby Hamilton -1 lap

Failed to qualify: Dave Marcis (#71), Rich Bickle (#91), Hut Stricklin (#58)*, Ed Berrier (#90)

- This would be the third time this season that the Burton brothers would finish 1–2, with Jeff winning all three races over Ward.
- During the weekend for this race, the #58 SBIII Motorsports team would shut down due to a sponsorship pullout.

=== Checker Auto Parts/Dura Lube 500 ===
The Checker Auto Parts/Dura Lube 500 was held November 7 at Phoenix International Raceway. John Andretti won the pole.

Top ten results

1. #20 - Tony Stewart*
2. #6 - Mark Martin
3. #18 - Bobby Labonte
4. #99 - Jeff Burton
5. #10 - Ricky Rudd
6. #88 - Dale Jarrett
7. #44 - Kyle Petty
8. #43 - John Andretti
9. #25 - Wally Dallenbach Jr.
10. #24 - Jeff Gordon

Failed to qualify: Mike Wallace (#32)

- Tony Stewart would be the first rookie since Davey Allison in 1987 to win two races in his rookie season.
- As of 2024, this is the fastest Cup race run at Phoenix.

=== Pennzoil 400 presented by Kmart ===
The inaugural Pennzoil 400 presented by Kmart was held November 14 at Homestead-Miami Speedway. David Green won the pole. This was the first NASCAR Cup Series race televised on NBC Sports.

Top ten results

1. #20 - Tony Stewart*
2. #18 - Bobby Labonte
3. #99 - Jeff Burton
4. #6 - Mark Martin
5. #88 - Dale Jarrett*
6. #31 - Mike Skinner
7. #44 - Kyle Petty
8. #3 - Dale Earnhardt -1 lap
9. #25 - Wally Dallenbach Jr. -1 lap
10. #24 - Jeff Gordon -1 lap

Failed to qualify: Dave Marcis (#71), Ed Berrier (#90), Derrike Cope (#41), Andy Belmont (#04), Bob Strait (#61)

- This was Ted Musgrave's final race as a full-time Winston Cup series regular. Musgrave quit the Butch Mock Motorsports team after this race. He would later re-surface in the Craftsman Truck Series and find success, winning 15 career races and the series championship in 2005.
- Dale Jarrett finished the race with a 211-point lead over Bobby Labonte, enough to clinch the 1999 Winston Cup Series championship with one race remaining, as the maximum amount of points earned in a race under the Latford points system is 185.
- Tony Stewart won his 3rd race of 1999, becoming the 1st rookie in NASCAR's modern era to win 3 races in one season. Stewart also became the 1st, and as of 2024, the only rookie in modern NASCAR history to win back-to-back races.

=== NAPA 500 ===
The NAPA 500 was held November 21 at Atlanta Motor Speedway. Kevin Lepage won the pole.

Top ten results

1. #18 - Bobby Labonte*
2. #88 - Dale Jarrett*
3. #12 - Jeremy Mayfield
4. #6 - Mark Martin
5. #99 - Jeff Burton
6. #97 - Chad Little
7. #10 - Ricky Rudd*
8. #31 - Mike Skinner
9. #3 - Dale Earnhardt
10. #4 - Bobby Hamilton

Failed to qualify: Darrell Waltrip (#66), Derrike Cope (#15), Hut Stricklin (#75), Ricky Craven (#50), Stacy Compton (#9), Morgan Shepherd (#05)

- Labonte's victory came after taking a provisional to make the race, starting back in the 37th.
- Series champion Dale Jarrett ended the season with 29 top-10 finishes in 34 races, a record that would stand until 2007, when Jeff Gordon scored 30 top-10s in 36 races.
- Ricky Rudd ended the 1999 season winless, ending his streak of 16 consecutive race-winning seasons, two short of breaking the all-time record of 18 seasons held by Richard Petty. His best finish in the 1999 season was two 3rd-place finishes. Petty's record would finally be broken by Kyle Busch in 2023.
- This would also be Rudd's final race as an owner-driver, as Rudd Performance Motorsports would shut-down after this race due to losing Tide as their primary sponsor. Rudd would move to Robert Yates Racing in 2000.

== Results and standings ==
=== Drivers' championship ===
(key) Bold - Pole position awarded by time. Italics - Pole position set by owner's points standings. *- Most laps led.

Pos	Driver	DAY	CAR	LVS	ATL	DAR	TEX	BRI	MAR	TAL	CAL	RCH	CLT	DOV	MCH	POC	SON	DAY	NHA	POC	IND	GLN	MCH	BRI	DAR	RCH	NHA	DOV	MAR	CLT	TAL	CAR	PHO	HOM	ATL	Points
1	Dale Jarrett	37	2	11	5	4	2	3	8	2	5	1	5	5	1*	3*	6	1	4	2	1*	4	4	38	16	3	18	3	10	7	2	4*	6	5	2	5262
2	Bobby Labonte	25	3	**5**	**2**	10	3	37	24	4	3	3	**2**	**1**	5	1	27	5	38	1	2	24	1	26	19	2	3	5	8	**2***	7	3	3	2*	1*	5061
3	Mark Martin	31	1	10	3	5	34	2	5	3	38	2	3	3	10	5	2	17	6	3	4	10	7	6	4	35	17	1*	16	4	15	**6**	2	4	4	4943
4	Tony Stewart **(R)**	28	12	36	11	6	6	15	**20**	5	4	15	4	4*	9	6	15	6	10*	4	7	6	3	**5***	12	1*	2	2	41	19	6	12	1*	1	15	4774
5	Jeff Burton	35	4*	1*	4	1*	7	5	2	11	2	37*	1*	8	3	36	24	3	1	36	5	13	37	17	1*	13	4	6	9	37	8	1	4	3	5	4733
6	Jeff Gordon	**1**	39	3	1*	**3**	43	6	3	38	1*	**31**	39	2	**2**	2	**1***	21	**3**	32	**3**	1*	2*	4	13	40	5	17	1	1	12*	11	10	10	38	4620
7	Dale Earnhardt	2	41	7	40	25	8	10	19	1*	12	8	6	11	16	7	9	2	8	9	10	20	5	1	22	6	13	8	2	12	1	40	11	8	9	4492
8	Rusty Wallace	8*	10	9	35	33	4	**1***	7*	41	11	5	31	6	12	43	4	11*	42	18	8	**3**	16	18	8	14	**6***	**32**	4	8	11	5	32	12	13	4155
9	Ward Burton	24	28	2	8	8	16	9	27	32	6	9	8	22	4	29	35	7	15	40	6	43	**43**	9	2	34	8	11	13	5	4	2	13	14	11	4062
10	Mike Skinner	4	6	4	6	32	42	21	4	36	10	30	9	19	18	22	17	4	23	**10***	12	9	36	23	36	**11**	27	21	6*	3	13	17	20	6	8	4003
11	Jeremy Mayfield	20	5	17	36	2	5	27	41	15	7	24	10	9	17	9	7	25	28	35	29	34	18	32	3	25	36	22	15	6	16	9	41	13	3	3743
12	Terry Labonte	38	7	8	13	11	1*	13	15	39	9	26	11	17	23	16	29	10	11	6	11	11	26	8	17	43	31	27	40	21	34	14	28	31	40	3580
13	Bobby Hamilton	29	9	24	12	7	29	18	33	31	30	4	13	21	31	10	11	8	16	17	38	22	35	41	7	7	11	30	30	22	9	10	23	25	10	3564
14	Steve Park	34	26	16	32	12	32	23	25	37	24	34	42	16	6	13	42	42	12	8	15	12	20	31	10	16	15	9	12	10	14	15	15	19	12	3481
15	Ken Schrader	6	11	18	26	43	17	20	9	**6**	14	14	7	41	13	27	39	20	35	34	18	17	25	10	9	21	12	26	21	23	25	30	14	29	19	3479
16	Sterling Marlin	32	37	15	18	16	9	14	13	25	16	18	40	29	22	**4**	25	12	34	28	16	33	15	7	40	4	21	38	11	29	22	8	40	17	31	3397
17	John Andretti	43	19	12	28	9	38	4	1	9	17	39	19	13	8	28	3	19	18	42	37	29	10	40	18	9	41	41	43	17	32	7	**8**	16	33	3394
18	Wally Dallenbach Jr.	12	17	13	39	38	23	30	18	20	8	20	21	20	14	39	41	26	7	5	14	7	23	28	21	28	22	15	22	33	35	39	9	9	23	3367
19	Kenny Irwin Jr.	3	23	41	23	35	**15**	11	36	35	13	40	15	10	11	18	22	14	26	43	13	26	34	24	**31**	5	10	10	39	15	10	13	21	33	29	3338
20	Jimmy Spencer	41	25	26	17	20	28	17	16	16	36	29	38	23	43	14	5	27	9	20	26	16	8	2	15	37	24	14	17	28	24	20	17	20	42	3312
21	Bill Elliott	27	15	37	15	14	21	25	30	10	19	12	14	12	41	31	13	23	5	39	23	28	19	36	11	36	19	33	20	11	20	33	35	24	22	3246
22	Kenny Wallace	42	13	40	29	33	39	16	6	7	27	41	12	39	21	25	14	15	2	37	39	19	27	11	35	12	34	43	5	30	5	16	18	15	34	3210
23	Chad Little	9	21	14	9	28	13	24	17	42	22	35	24	28	28	32	16	29	24	22	43	14	6	30	20	42	28	7	31	18	36	21	16	39	6	3193
24	Elliott Sadler **(R)**	40	38	33	31	36	10	26	28	29	21	23	17	27	36	20	18	22	20	21	21	18	11	35	14	17	14	12	25	26	21	18	27	18	16	3191
25	Kevin Lepage	13	42	21	19	22	41	35	21	12	18	13	26	26	29	17	32	30	22	24	30	25	39	22	5	26	26	13	27	9	18	22	24	26	**17**	3185
26	Kyle Petty	7	43	DNQ	43	31	DNQ	8	10	13	26	7	30	32	27	19	8	36	41	16	41	8	31	29	28	15	33	20	7	32	19	23	7	7	24	3103
27	Geoff Bodine	39	8	32	38	17	36	28	38	17	37	17	41	15	20	33	28	28	32	13	25	35	17	13	24	23	35	24	3	20	23	31	22	11	18	3053
28	Johnny Benson	17	16	38	22	18	11	29	35	30	43	28	18	7	19	30	26	24	17	14	19	38	21	33	32	22	7	18	28	16	42	28	31	35	39	3012
29	Michael Waltrip	5	20	22	10	21	14	12	39	18	23	22	37	42	15	37	10	39	19	12	27	21	13	37	41	38	38	19	33	14	39	27	33	36	36	2974
30	Joe Nemechek	36	24	35	14	19	33	36	37	34	40	6	32	25	34	42	19	**16**	37	29	22	30	22	19	6	20	1	35	**38**	13	**30**	26	19	21	32	2956
31	Ricky Rudd	30	**30**	43	25	27	19	38	29	19	41	36	28	14	38	15	38	13	27	27	9	32	38	3	34	27	42	37	18	38	3	19	5	41	7	2922
32	Rick Mast	10	35	19	16	13	30	19	42	24	31	16	34	34	37	12	23	32	30	19	36	23	12	21	30	41	9	34	29	25	26	38	36	28	41	2845
33	Ted Musgrave	15	40	DNQ	24	29	31	7	40	28	29	11	23	24	25	11	20	35	25	33	35	27	41	16	38	8	23	28	19	31	29	32	29	42		2689
34	Jerry Nadeau	11	31	31	27	40	24	42	32	8	20	21	20	30	26	23	34	37	36	38	31	5	29	20	43	18	32	16	26	34	40	37	37	38	20	2686
35	Brett Bodine	22	33	20	33	30	18	22	14	43	28	38	22	37	30	26	31	34	31	26	DNQ	40	DNQ	12	26	31	29	29	42	27	31	43	42	40	30	2351
36	David Green	DNQ	18	27	21	42	26	33	26	33	25	43	27	18	35	38	36	33	DNQ	41	20	37	32	25	42	33	40	42	36	42	17	24	12	**22**	21	2320
37	Darrell Waltrip	21	27	25	20	41	25	32	12	26	15	25	43	DNQ	39	34	12	38	33	25	42	15	DNQ	14	29	32	DNQ	DNQ	23	DNQ	DNQ	34	26	43	DNQ	2158
38	Rich Bickle	33	DNQ	23	30	DNQ	12	DNQ	11	14	32	10	25	33	24	24	21	18	14	7	DNQ	36	28	DNQ	23		20	36	37	39	41	DNQ				2149
39	Robert Pressley	19	14	DNQ	DNQ	15	20	40	23	22	39	27	35	40	42	35	40	DNQ	DNQ	23	17	DNQ	42	43	25	39	30	23	35	24	DNQ	29	38	37	27	2050
40	Ernie Irvan	14	29	6	7	24	37	43	22	40	35	33	36	35	7	8	30	9	21	11	24	41	QL													1915
41	Ricky Craven	26	22	39	42	37	27	41	43	27	34	19	DNQ	31				43	13		34		30	42			43	40	24	43		41	30	32	DNQ	1513
42	Dave Marcis	16	34	DNQ	34	DNQ	DNQ	34	DNQ	23	33	DNQ	DNQ	38	DNQ	41		31	DNQ	30	40	DNQ	33	34	33	DNQ	25	39	34	DNQ	38	DNQ	34	DNQ	28	1324
43	Hut Stricklin										DNQ	DNQ	33	DNQ	DNQ	DNQ		DNQ	39	15	33	DNQ	9	27	27	DNQ	16	25	14	DNQ	DNQ	DNQ			DNQ	918
44	Derrike Cope	18	DNQ	34	41	DNQ	22	DNQ	34	DNQ	42	42	DNQ	36	32	DNQ	37	DNQ	DNQ	DNQ	32	DNQ	DNQ				DNQ	DNQ		35	37	25	43	DNQ	DNQ	915
45	Buckshot Jones **(R)**	DNQ	DNQ	29	37	34	35	39	DNQ	21	DNQ	DNQ	29	DNQ	DNQ	Wth		41			DNQ									DNQ	27				26	676
46	Todd Bodine																							15	DNQ	19	39	DNQ		36			25	27	43	529
47	Dick Trickle	DNQ				26	DNQ	31	31	DNQ		32	DNQ	43	Wth	40			29		DNQ		40	DNQ		QL	DNQ	DNQ	DNQ	41						528
48	Dale Earnhardt Jr.												16						43				24			10									14	500
49	Matt Kenseth					QL																	14		37			4		40		35				434
50	Steve Grissom	DNQ	36	42	DNQ																DNQ			39	39	30					28					336
51	Dave Blaney														33				40		28													23	37	332
52	Ed Berrier					39																						31		DNQ	33	DNQ		DNQ	25	268
53	Mike Wallace	23																			DNQ					24							DNQ			185
54	Ron Fellows																					2														175
55	Stacy Compton																															36	39	30	DNQ	174
56	Stanton Barrett	DNQ		30			DNQ	DNQ										Wth		31	DNQ		DNQ		DNQ	DNQ										143
57	Tom Hubert			28													33						DNQ													143
58	Mike Bliss																												32			42				104
59	Boris Said										DNQ						DNQ				DNQ	42												34		103
60	Jeff Green	DNQ					Wth						DNQ			21																				100
61	Randy LaJoie						40						DNQ														37									95
62	Loy Allen Jr.									DNQ					40	DNQ	QL	40																		86
63	Ron Hornaday Jr.			DNQ																						29			DNQ							76
64	Ted Christopher																					31														70
65	Morgan Shepherd	DNQ	32	DNQ	DNQ				DNQ				DNQ							DNQ	DNQ								DNQ						DNQ	67
66	Gary Bradberry	DNQ	Wth	Wth	Wth																DNQ									DNQ					35	58
67	David Murry																Wth					39														46
68	Andy Hillenburg	DNQ																												DNQ	43					34
69	Butch Gilliland			DNQ							DNQ						43																			34
70	Mark Gibson	DNQ																																		
71	Jim Sauter	DNQ																																		
72	Norm Benning	DNQ																																		
73	Glen Morgan	DNQ																																		
74	Billy Standridge	DNQ	DNQ																																	
75	Dan Pardus **(R)**	DNQ								DNQ			DNQ																							
76	Ken Bouchard	DNQ					Wth			DNQ								DNQ																		
77	Ron Burns			DNQ																																
78	Carl Long							Wth					DNQ																							
79	R. K. Smith																DNQ																			
80	Austin Cameron			Wth													DNQ																			
81	Sean Woodside																DNQ																			
82	John Metcalf																DNQ																			
83	Mike Borkowski																DNQ																			
84	Steve Portenga																DNQ																			
85	Lance Hooper																				DNQ															
86	Bob Strait																				DNQ													DNQ		
87	Paul Gentilozzi																					DNQ														
88	Jack Baldwin																					DNQ														
89	Jack Sprague																									DNQ										
90	Tom Baldwin																									DNQ										
91	Andy Belmont																										DNQ	DNQ						DNQ		
92	Tim Fedewa																												DNQ							
93	Bobby Gerhart																														DNQ					
94	Harris DeVane				Wth																															
95	Érik Comas																Wth																			
Pos	Driver	DAY	CAR	LVS	ATL	DAR	TEX	BRI	MAR	TAL	CAL	RCH	CLT	DOV	MCH	POC	SON	DAY	NHA	POC	IND	GLN	MCH	BRI	DAR	RCH	NHA	DOV	MAR	CLT	TAL	CAR	PHO	HOM	ATL	Points

=== Owners' championship ===
(key) Bold - Pole position awarded by time. Italics - Pole position set by owner's points standings. * – Most laps led.

Pos	Car	Owner	Drivers	DAY	CAR	LVS	ATL	DAR	TEX	BRI	MAR	TAL	CAL	RCH	CLT	DOV	MCH	POC	SON	DAY	NHA	POC	IND	GLN	MCH	BRI	DAR	RCH	NHA	DOV	MAR	CLT	TAL	CAR	PHO	HOM	ATL	Points
1	88	Robert Yates Racing	Jarrett	37	2	11	5	4	2	3	8	2	5	1	5	5	1*	3*	6	1	4	2	1*	4	4	38	16	3	18	3	10	7	2	4*	6	5	2	5262
2	18	Joe Gibbs Racing	Bobby Labonte	25	3	**5**	**2**	10	3	37	24	4	3	3	**2**	**1**	5	1	27	5	38	1	2	24	1	26	19	2	3	5	8	**2***	7	3	3	2*	1*	5061
3	6	Roush Racing	Martin	31	1	10	3	5	34	2	5	3	38	2	3	3	10	5	2	17	6	3	4	10	7	6	4	35	17	1*	16	4	15	**6**	2	4	4	4943
4	20	Joe Gibbs Racing	Stewart **(R)**	28	12	36	11	6	6	15	**20**	5	4	15	4	4*	9	6	15	6	10*	4	7	6	3	**5***	12	1*	2	2	41	19	6	12	1*	1	15	4774
5	99	Roush Racing	Jeff Burton	35	4*	1*	4	1*	7	5	2	11	2	37*	1*	8	3	36	24	3	1	36	5	13	37	17	1*	13	4	6	9	37	8	1	4	3	5	4733
6	24	Hendrick Motorsports	Jeff Gordon	**1**	39	3	1*	**3**	43	6	3	38	1*	**31**	39	2	**2**	2	**1***	21	**3**	32	**3**	1*	2*	4	13	40	5	17	1	1	12*	11	10	10	38	4620
7	3	Richard Childress Racing	Earnhardt	2	41	7	40	25	8	10	19	1*	12	8	6	11	16	7	9	2	8	9	10	20	5	1	22	6	13	8	2	12	1	40	11	8	9	4492
8	2	Penske-Kranefuss Racing	Rusty Wallace	8*	10	9	35	33	4	**1***	7*	41	11	5	31	6	12	43	4	11*	42	18	8	**3**	16	18	8	14	**6***	**32**	4	8	11	5	32	12	13	4155
9	22	Bill Davis Racing	Ward Burton	24	28	2	8	8	16	9	27	32	6	9	8	22	4	29	35	7	15	40	6	43	**43**	9	2	34	8	11	13	5	4	2	13	14	11	4062
10	31	Richard Childress Racing	Skinner	4	6	4	6	32	42	21	4	36	10	30	9	19	18	22	17	4	23	**10***	12	9	36	23	36	**11**	27	21	6*	3	13	17	20	6	8	4003
11	12	Penske-Kranefuss Racing	Mayfield	20	5	17	36	2	5	27	41	15	7	24	10	9	17	9	7	25	28	35	29	34	18	32	3	25	36	22	15	6	16	9	41	13	3	3743
12	5	Hendrick Motorsports	Terry Labonte	38	7	8	13	11	1*	13	15	39	9	26	11	17	23	16	29	10	11	6	11	11	26	8	17	43	31	27	40	21	34	14	28	31	40	3580
13	4	Morgan-McClure Motorsports	Hamilton	29	9	24	12	7	29	18	33	31	30	4	13	21	31	10	11	8	16	17	38	22	35	41	7	7	11	30	30	22	9	10	23	25	10	3564
14	1	Dale Earnhardt, Inc.	Park	34	26	16	32	12	32	23	25	37	24	34	42	16	6	13	42	42	12	8	15	12	20	31	10	16	15	9	12	10	14	15	15	19	12	3481
15	33	Andy Petree Racing	Schrader	6	11	18	26	43	17	20	9	**6**	14	14	7	41	13	27	39	20	35	34	18	17	25	10	9	21	12	26	21	23	25	30	14	29	19	3479
16	40	Team SABCO	Marlin	32	37	15	18	16	9	14	13	25	16	18	40	29	22	**4**	25	12	34	28	16	33	15	7	40	4	21	38	11	29	22	8	40	17	31	3397
17	43	Petty Enterprises	Andretti	43	19	12	28	9	38	4	1	9	17	39	19	13	8	28	3	19	18	42	37	29	10	40	18	9	41	41	43	17	32	7	**8**	16	33	3394
18	25	Hendrick Motorsports	Dallenbach Jr.	12	17	13	39	38	23	30	18	20	8	20	21	20	14	39	41	26	7	5	14	7	23	28	21	28	22	15	22	33	35	39	9	9	23	3367
19	28	Robert Yates Racing	Irwin Jr.	3	23	41	23	35	**15**	11	36	35	13	40	15	10	11	18	22	14	26	43	13	26	34	24	**31**	5	10	10	39	15	10	13	21	33	29	3338
20	23	Haas-Carter Motorsports	Spencer	41	25	26	17	20	28	17	16	16	36	29	38	23	43	14	5	27	9	20	26	16	8	2	15	37	24	14	17	28	24	20	17	20	42	3312
21	94	Bill Elliott Racing	Elliot	27	15	37	15	14	21	25	30	10	19	12	14	12	41	31	13	23	5	39	23	28	19	36	11	36	19	33	20	11	20	33	35	24	22	3246
22	55	Andy Petree Racing	Kenny Wallace	42	13	40	29	33	39	16	6	7	27	41	12	39	21	25	14	15	2	37	39	19	27	11	35	12	34	43	5	30	5	16	18	15	34	3210
23	97	Roush Racing	Little	9	21	14	9	28	13	24	17	42	22	35	24	28	28	32	16	29	24	22	43	14	6	30	20	42	28	7	31	18	36	21	16	39	6	3193
24	21	Wood Brothers Racing	Sadler **(R)**	40	38	33	31	36	10	26	28	29	21	23	17	27	36	20	18	22	20	21	21	18	11	35	14	17	14	12	25	26	21	18	27	18	16	3191
25	16	Roush Racing	Lepage	13	42	21	19	22	41	35	21	12	18	13	26	26	29	17	32	30	22	24	30	25	39	22	5	26	26	13	27	9	18	22	24	26	**17**	3185
26	44	Petty Enterprises	Petty	7	43	DNQ	43	31	DNQ	8	10	13	26	7	30	32	27	19	8	36	41	16	41	8	31	29	28	15	33	20	7	32	19	23	7	7	24	3103
27	60	Joe Bessey Motorsports	Geoff Bodine	39	8	32	38	17	36	28	38	17	37	17	41	15	20	33	28	28	32	13	25	35	17	13	24	23	35	24	3	20	23	31	22	11	18	3053
28	26	Roush Racing	Benson	17	16	38	22	18	11	29	35	30	43	28	18	7	19	30	26	24	17	14	19	38	21	33	32	22	7	18	28	16	42	28	31	35	39	3012
29	7	Mattei Motorsports	Michael Waltrip	5	20	22	10	21	14	12	39	18	23	22	37	42	15	37	10	39	19	12	27	21	13	37	41	38	38	19	33	14	39	27	33	36	36	2974
30	42	Team SABCO	Nemechek	36	24	35	14	19	33	36	37	34	40	6	32	25	34	42	19	**16**	37	29	22	30	22	19	6	20	1	35	**38**	13	**30**	26	19	21	32	2956
31	10	Rudd Performance Motorsports	Rudd	30	**30**	43	25	27	19	38	29	19	41	36	28	14	38	15	38	13	27	27	9	32	38	3	34	27	42	37	18	38	3	19	5	41	7	2922
32	98	Yarborough Burdette Motorsports	Mast	10	35	19	16	13	30	19	42	24	31	16	34	34	37	12	23	32	30	19	36	23	12	21	30	41	9	34	29	25	26	38	36	28	41	2845
33	36	MB2 Motorsports	Irvan	14	29	6	7	24	37	43	22	40	35	33	36	35	7	8	30	9	21	11	24	41	QL													2831
33	36	MB2 Motorsports	Trickle																						40													2831
33	36	MB2 Motorsports	Nadeau																							20	43	18	32	16	26	34	40	37	37	38	20	2831
34	45	Tyler Jet Motorsports	Bickle	33	DNQ	23	30	DNQ	12	DNQ	11	14	32	10	25	33	24	24	21	18	14	7	DNQ	36	28	DNQ	23											2723
34	45	Tyler Jet Motorsports	Sprague																									DNQ										2723
34	45	Tyler Jet Motorsports	Green																										40	42	36	42	17	24	12	**22**	21	2723
35	75	Butch Mock Motorsports	Musgrave	15	40	DNQ	24	29	31	7	40	28	29	11	23	24	25	11	20	35	25	33	35	27	41	16	38	8	23	28	19	31	29	32	29	42		2689
35	75	Butch Mock Motorsports	Stricklin																																		DNQ	2689
36	9	Melling Racing	Nadeau	11	31	31	27	40	24	42	32	8	20	21	20	30	26	23	34	37	36	38	31	5	29													2686
36	9	Melling Racing	Grissom																							39	39	30										2686
36	9	Melling Racing	Bickle																										20	36	37	39	41					2686
36	9	Melling Racing	Compton																															36	39	30	DNQ	2686
37	11	Brett Bodine Racing	Brett Bodine	22	33	20	33	30	18	22	14	43	28	38	22	37	30	26	31	34	31	26	DNQ	40	DNQ	12	26	31	29	29	42	27	31	43	42	40	30	2351
38	66	Haas-Carter Motorsports	Darrell Waltrip	21	27	25	20	41	25	32	12	26	15	25	43	DNQ	39	34	12	38	33	25	42	15	DNQ	14	29	32	DNQ	DNQ	23	DNQ	DNQ	34	26	43	DNQ	2158
39	77	Jasper Motorsports	Pressley	19	14	DNQ	DNQ	15	20	40	23	22	39	27	35	40	42	35	40	DNQ	DNQ	23	17	DNQ	42	43	25	39	30	23	35	24	DNQ	29	38	37	27	2050
41	58	SBIII Motorsports	Craven	26	22	39	42	37	27	41	43	27	34	19	DNQ	31																						1921
41	58	SBIII Motorsports	Allen Jr.														40	DNQ		40																		1921
41	58	SBIII Motorsports	Woodside																DNQ																			1921
41	58	SBIII Motorsports	Stricklin																		39	15	33	DNQ	9	27	27	DNQ	16	25	14	DNQ	DNQ	DNQ				1921
43	71	Marcis Auto Racing	Marcis	16	34	DNQ	34	DNQ	DNQ	34	DNQ	23	33	DNQ	DNQ	38	DNQ	41		31	DNQ	30	40	DNQ	33	34	33	DNQ	25	39	34	DNQ	38	DNQ	34	DNQ	28	1324
43	71	Marcis Auto Racing	Smith																DNQ																			1324
	90	Donlavey Racing	Mike Wallace	23																																		1083
	90	Donlavey Racing	Shepherd		32		DNQ				DNQ																											1083
	90	Donlavey Racing	Barrett			30			DNQ	DNQ										DNQ		31	DNQ		DNQ		DNQ	DNQ										1083
	90	Donlavey Racing	Berrier					39																						31		DNQ	33	DNQ		DNQ	25	1083
	90	Donlavey Racing	Allen Jr.									DNQ																										1083
	90	Donlavey Racing	Stricklin										DNQ	DNQ	33	DNQ	DNQ	DNQ																				1083
	50	Midwest Transit Racing	Pardus	DNQ								DNQ			DNQ																							855
	50	Midwest Transit Racing	Standridge		DNQ																																	855
	50	Midwest Transit Racing	Hornaday Jr.			DNQ																																855
	50	Midwest Transit Racing	Craven																	43	13		34		30	42			43	40	24	43		41	30	32	DNQ	855
	8	Dale Earnhardt, Inc.	Earnhardt Jr.												16						43				24			10									14	500
	17	Roush Racing	Kenseth																						14		37			4		40		35				434
	93	Bill Davis Racing	Blaney														33				40		28													23	37	332
	87	NEMCO Motorsports	Fellows																					2														175
	05	Shepherd Racing	Shepherd												DNQ								DNQ								DNQ						DNQ	
	81	Pinnacle Motorsports	Shepherd	DNQ																																		
	73	Barkdoll Racing	Bouchard	DNQ																																		0
	72	Marcis Auto Racing	Sauter	DNQ																																		0
	13	Elliott-Marino Racing	Trickle	DNQ																																		0
	47	Standridge Motorsports	Standridge	DNQ																																		0
	48	Fast Track Racing	Morgan	DNQ																																		0

== Rookie of the Year ==
The 1999 Rookie of the Year battle was expected to be one of the most competitive in years. However, it ended up proving to be a runaway as Tony Stewart won three races and finished fourth in points. Elliott Sadler, who was considered the top favorite for the award during the pre-season, only had one top-ten finish and was the only rookie besides Stewart to complete the full schedule. Buckshot Jones was another favorite, but a long string of DNQs and DNFs forced him to cut back his schedule and abandon his run for the award. Stanton Barrett began the year with his own team, then left for Junie Donlavey, only making two races. Dan Pardus hoped to run a part-time schedule with Midwest Transit Racing, but he did not qualify for any of his attempts, and was released after the Coca-Cola 600. Finally, Mike Harmon was scheduled to drive the No. 90, but did not even attempt a race after a sponsorship fallout with Big Daddy's BBQ Sauce.

== Gallery ==
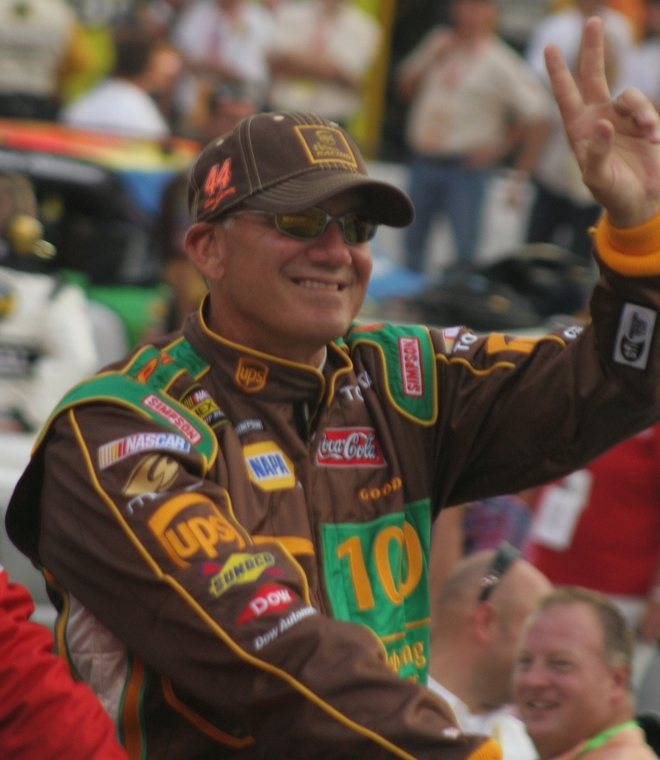
1999 NASCAR Winston Cup champion Dale Jarrett waves to the fans before the 2007 Sharpie 500

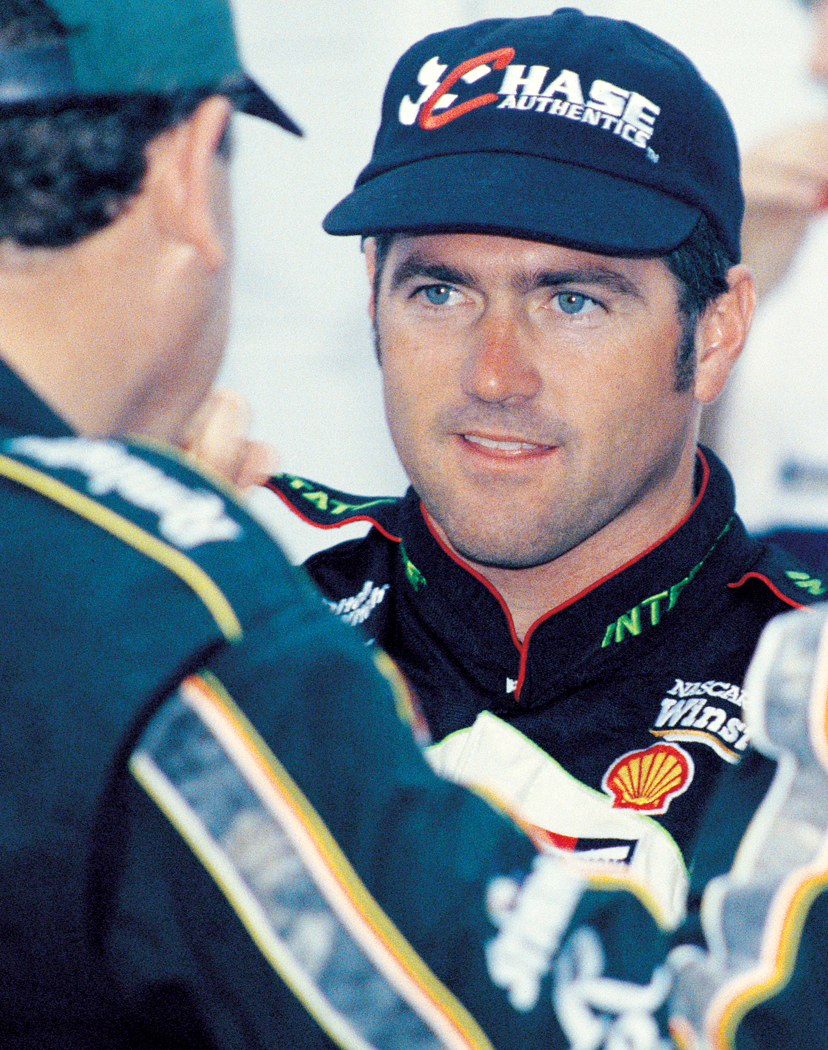
Bobby Labonte finished second behind Jarrett by 201 points.

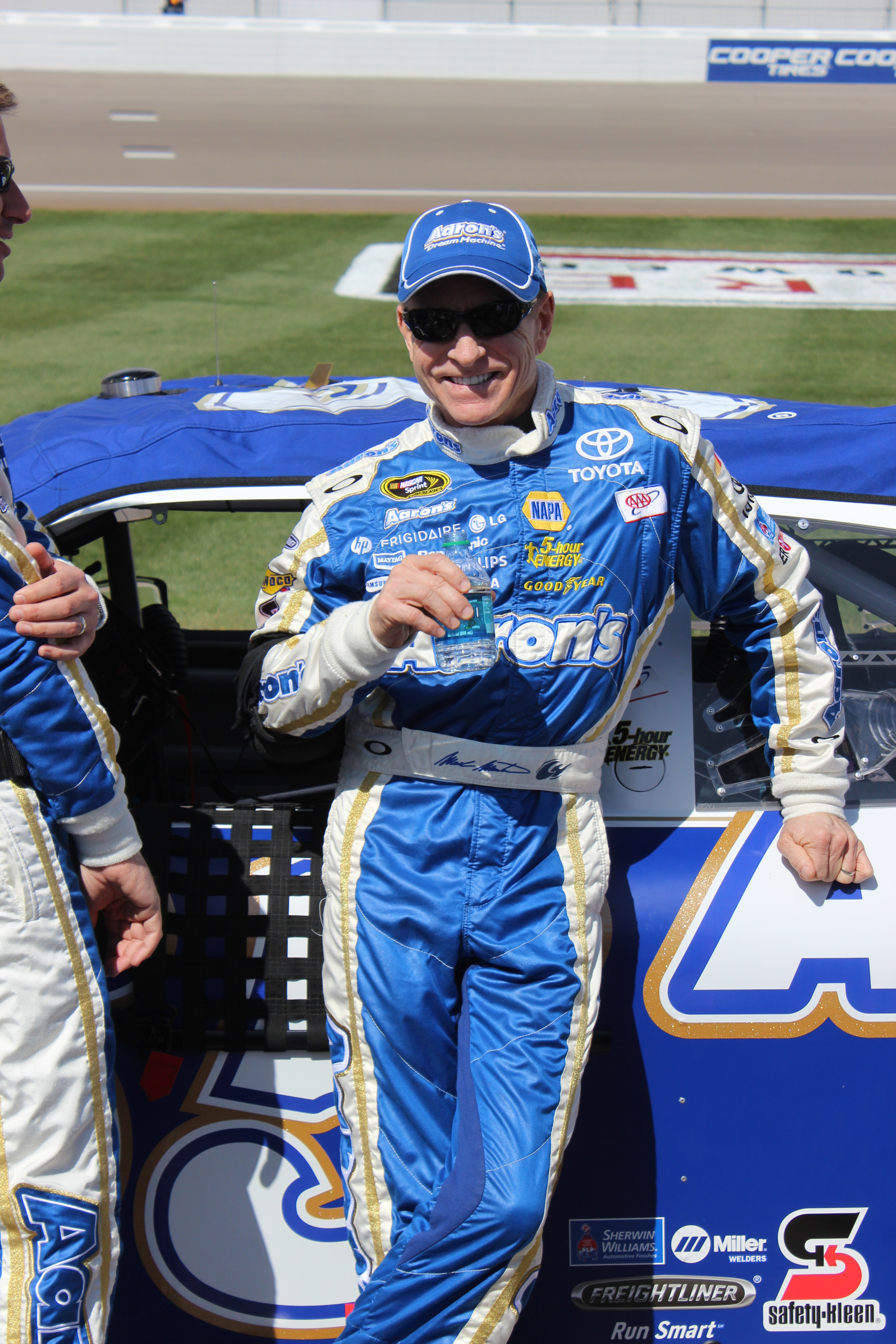
Mark Martin (seen here in 2012 driving for Michael Waltrip Racing) finished third in the championship.

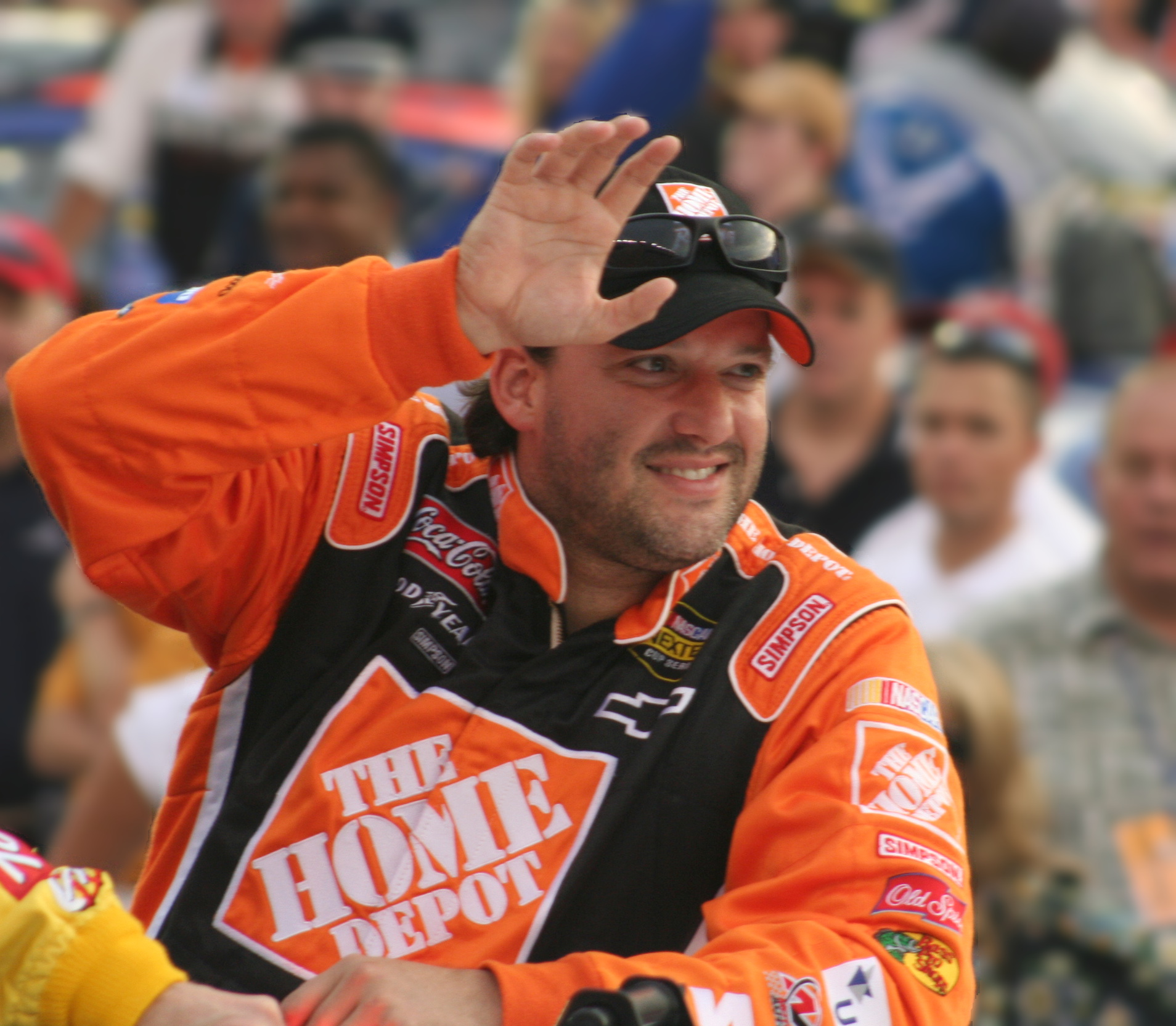
Tony Stewart (seen here in 2007) had an impressive rookie season, winning three races along with the Rookie of the Year award, and finished fourth in the final point standings.

== See also ==
- 1999 NASCAR Busch Series
- 1999 NASCAR Craftsman Truck Series
- 1999 NASCAR Winston West Series
- 1999 NASCAR Goody's Dash Series
- 1999 ARCA Bondo/Mar-Hyde Series
