= 1999 Exide NASCAR Select Batteries 400 =

Race details
- Race 25 of 34 in the 1999 NASCAR Winston Cup Series season
- 1999 Exide NASCAR Select Batteries 400 program cover, featuring Jeff Burton. "Under the Lights!"
- Date: September 11, 1999
- Location: Richmond International Raceway, Richmond, Virginia
- Course: Permanent racing facility
- Course length: 0.75 miles (1.2 km)
- Distance: 400 laps, 300 mi (482.803 km)
- Average speed: 104.006 mph (167.381 km/h)

Pole position
Driver	Mike Skinner	Richard Childress Racing

Most laps led
Driver	Tony Stewart	Joe Gibbs Racing
- Laps: 333

Winner
No. 20	Tony Stewart	Joe Gibbs Racing

Television in the United States
- Network: ESPN
- Announcers: Bob Jenkins, Benny Parsons, & Ned Jarrett

The 1999 Exide NASCAR Select Batteries 400 was a NASCAR Winston Cup Series race held on September 11, 1999, at Richmond International Raceway in Richmond, Virginia. Contested over 400 laps on the three–quarter (1.2 km) short track, it was the 25th race of the 1999 NASCAR Winston Cup Series season. Tony Stewart of Joe Gibbs Racing won the race, earning his first career Winston Cup Series win. Bobby Labonte finished second and Dale Jarrett finished third.

== Background ==
In 1953, Richmond International Raceway began hosting the Grand National Series with Lee Petty winning that first race in Richmond. The original track was paved in 1968. In 1988, the track was re-designed into its present D-shaped configuration

The name for the raceway complex was "Strawberry Hill" until the Virginia State Fairgrounds site was bought out in 1999 and renamed the "Richmond International Raceway".

== Entry list ==
Car	Driver	Team	Manufacturer	Sponsor
1	Steve Park	Dale Earnhardt, Inc.	Chevrolet	Pennzoil
01	Ron Hornaday Jr.	SABCO Racing	Chevrolet	Tracfone
2	Rusty Wallace	Penske-Kranefuss Racing	Ford	Miller Lite
3	Dale Earnhardt Sr.	Richard Childress Racing	Chevrolet	GM Goodwrench Service Plus
4	Bobby Hamilton	Morgan-McClure Motorsports	Chevrolet	Kodak
5	Terry Labonte	Hendrick Motorsports	Chevrolet	Kellogg's
6	Mark Martin	Roush Racing	Ford	Valvoline/Cummins
7	Michael Waltrip	Mattei Motorsports	Chevrolet	Philips Electronics
8	Dale Earnhardt Jr.	Dale Earnhardt, Inc.	Chevrolet	Budweiser
9	Steve Grissom	Melling Racing	Ford	WCW
10	Ricky Rudd	Rudd Performance Motorsports	Ford	Tide
11	Brett Bodine	Brett Bodine Racing	Ford	Paychex
12	Jeremy Mayfield	Penske-Kranefuss Racing	Ford	Mobil 1
16	Kevin Lepage	Roush Racing	Ford	TV Guide/Tim McGraw
18	Bobby Labonte	Joe Gibbs Racing	Pontiac	Interstate Batteries
20	Tony Stewart	Joe Gibbs Racing	Toyota	Home Depot
21	Elliott Sadler	Wood Brothers Racing	Ford	Citgo
22	Ward Burton	Bill Davis Racing	Pontiac	Caterpillar
23	Jimmy Spencer	Haas-Carter Motorsports	Ford	Team Winston
24	Jeff Gordon	Hendrick Motorsports	Chevrolet	DuPont Automotive Finishes
25	Wally Dallenbach Jr.	Hendrick Motorsports	Chevrolet	Budweiser
26	Johnny Benson Jr.	Roush Racing	Ford	Cheerios
28	Kenny Irwin Jr.	Robert Yates Racing	Ford	Texaco/Havoline
30	Todd Bodine	Eel River Racing	Pontiac	State Fair Corn Dogs
31	Mike Skinner	Richard Childress Racing	Chevrolet	Lowe's
32	Mike Wallace	Ultra Motorsports	Ford	Ultra Wheels/Biagi Brothers
33	Ken Schrader	Andy Petree Racing	Chevrolet	Skoal
36	Jerry Nadeau	MB2 Motorsports	Pontiac	M&M's
40	Sterling Marlin	SABCO Racing	Chevrolet	Coors Light
41	David Green	Larry Hedrick Motorsports	Chevrolet	Kodiak
42	Joe Nemechek	SABCO Racing	Chevrolet	BellSouth
43	John Andretti	Petty Enterprises	Dodge	STP/NFL Players Inc.
44	Kyle Petty	Petty Enterprises	Pontiac	Hot Wheels
45	Jack Sprague	Tyler Jet Motorsports	Pontiac	AT&T/10-10-345
55	Kenny Wallace	Andy Petree Racing	Chevrolet	Square D
58	Hut Stricklin	SBIII Motorsports	Ford	Federated Auto Parts
60	Geoff Bodine	Joe Bessey Motorsports	Chevrolet	Power Team
66	Darrell Waltrip	Haas-Carter Motorsports	Ford	Big Kmart/Route 66
71	Dave Marcis	Marcis Auto Racing	Chevrolet	RealTree Camouflage
75	Ted Musgrave	Butch Mock Motorsports	Ford	Polaris
77	Robert Pressley	Jasper Motorsports	Ford	Jasper Engines & Transmissions
88	Dale Jarrett	Robert Yates Racing	Ford	Quality Care/Ford Credit
90	Stanton Barrett	Donlavey Racing	Ford	Hills Brothers Coffee/Nesquik
91	Tommy Baldwin Jr.	LJ Racing	Chevrolet	All INVICA-Shield
94	Bill Elliott	Bill Elliott Racing	Ford	McDonald's
97	Chad Little	Roush Racing	Ford	John Deere
98	Rick Mast	Cale Yarborough Motorsports	Ford	Woody Woodpecker
99	Jeff Burton	Roush Racing	Ford	Exide Batteries

== Qualifying ==
Pos.	Driver	Car	Manufacturer	Time	Avg. Speed
1	Mike Skinner	31	Chevrolet	21.520	125.465
2	Tony Stewart	20	Pontiac	21.544	125.325
3	Rusty Wallace	2	Ford	21.558	125.244
4	Bobby Labonte	18	Pontiac	21.582	125.104
5	Geoffrey Bodine	60	Chevrolet	21.607	124.960
6	Jeff Gordon	24	Chevrolet	21.625	124.855
7	Jeff Burton	99	Ford	21.641	124.763
8	Kenny Wallace	55	Chevrolet	21.652	124.700
9	Kenny Irwin, Jr.	28	Ford	21.655	124.683
10	Steve Park	1	Chevrolet	21.678	124.550
11	Jimmy Spencer	23	Ford	21.681	124.533
12	Ted Musgrave	75	Ford	21.694	124.458
13	Dale Jarrett	88	Ford	21.699	124.430
14	Jeremy Mayfield	12	Ford	21.700	124.424
15	Terry Labonte	5	Chevrolet	21.702	124.412
16	Rick Mast	98	Ford	21.703	124.407
17	Bill Elliott	94	Ford	21.706	124.390
18	Kyle Petty	44	Pontiac	21.711	124.361
19	Ward Burton	22	Pontiac	21.718	124.321
20	Mark Martin	6	Ford	21.745	124.166
21	Dale Earnhardt, Jr.	8	Chevrolet	21.760	124.081
22	Bobby Hamilton	4	Chevrolet	21.761	124.075
23	Ken Schrader	33	Chevrolet	21.786	123.933
24	John Andretti	43	Pontiac	21.790	123.910
25	Sterling Marlin	40	Chevrolet	21.797	123.870
26	Wally Dallenbach, Jr.	25	Chevrolet	21.801	123.848
27	Kevin Lepage	16	Ford	21.835	123.655
28	Joe Nemechek	42	Chevrolet	21.851	123.564
29	Mike Wallace	32	Ford	21.864	123.491
30	Johnny Benson, Jr.	26	Ford	21.882	123.389
31	Dick Trickle	10	Ford	21.882	123.389
32	Chad Little	97	Ford	21.892	123.333
33	Dale Earnhardt	3	Chevrolet	21.894	123.321
34	Todd Bodine	30	Pontiac	21.898	123.299
35	Ron Hornaday, Jr.	01	Chevrolet	21.902	123.276
36	Michael Waltrip	7	Chevrolet	21.905	123.260
Provisionals
37	Elliott Sadler	21	Ford	0.000	0.000
38	Jerry Nadeau	36	Pontiac	0.000	0.000
39	Steve Grissom	9	Ford	0.000	0.000
40	Darrell Waltrip	66	Ford	0.000	0.000
41	Brett Bodine	11	Ford	0.000	0.000
42	David Green	41	Chevrolet	0.000	0.000
43	Robert Pressley	77	Ford	0.000	0.000
Failed to qualify
44	Jack Sprague	45	Pontiac	21.943	123.046
45	Dave Marcis	71	Chevrolet	22.031	122.555
46	Hut Stricklin	58	Ford	22.180	121.731
47	Stanton Barrett	90	Ford	22.311	121.017
48	Tom Baldwin	91	Chevrolet	22.336	120.881

== Race results ==
Fin	St	#	Driver	Sponsor	Make	Team	Laps	Led	Status	Pts	Winnings
1	2	20	Tony Stewart	Home Depot	Pontiac	Joe Gibbs Racing	400	333	running	185	135160
2	4	18	Bobby Labonte	Interstate Batteries	Pontiac	Joe Gibbs Racing	400	7	running	175	77990
3	13	88	Dale Jarrett	Quality Care, Ford Credit	Ford	Robert Yates Racing	400	0	running	165	64605
4	25	40	Sterling Marlin	Coors Light	Chevy	SABCO Racing	400	0	running	160	60105
5	9	28	Kenny Irwin, Jr.	Texaco, Havoline	Ford	Robert Yates Racing	400	0	running	155	49570
6	33	3	Dale Earnhardt	GM Goodwrench Service Plus	Chevy	Richard Childress Racing	400	0	running	150	47055
7	22	4	Bobby Hamilton	Kodak	Chevy	Morgan-McClure Motorsports	400	0	running	146	48430
8	12	75	Ted Musgrave	Polaris	Ford	Butch Mock Motorsports	400	0	running	142	37405
9	24	43	John Andretti	STP, NFL Players Inc.	Pontiac	Petty Enterprises	399	0	running	138	45305
10	21	8	Dale Earnhardt, Jr.	Budweiser	Chevy	Dale Earnhardt, Inc.	399	0	running	134	29905
11	1	31	Mike Skinner	Lowe's	Chevy	Richard Childress Racing	399	3	running	135	44495
12	8	55	Kenny Wallace	Square D	Chevy	Andy Petree Racing	399	0	running	127	31880
13	7	99	Jeff Burton	Exide Batteries	Ford	Roush Racing	399	0	running	124	47730
14	3	2	Rusty Wallace	Miller Lite	Ford	Penske-Kranefuss Racing	399	0	running	121	41130
15	18	44	Kyle Petty	Hot Wheels	Pontiac	Petty Enterprises	399	0	running	118	30505
16	10	1	Steve Park	Pennzoil	Chevy	Dale Earnhardt, Inc.	399	0	running	115	35730
17	37	21	Elliott Sadler	Citgo	Ford	Wood Brothers Racing	398	0	running	112	37170
18	38	36	Jerry Nadeau	M&M's	Pontiac	MB2 Motorsports	398	0	running	109	38080
19	34	30	Todd Bodine	State Fair Corn Dogs	Pontiac	Eel River Racing	398	0	running	106	24155
20	28	42	Joe Nemechek	BellSouth	Chevy	SABCO Racing	398	0	running	103	37055
21	23	33	Ken Schrader	Skoal	Chevy	Andy Petree Racing	397	0	running	100	35320
22	30	26	Johnny Benson, Jr.	Cheerios	Ford	Roush Racing	397	0	running	97	34755
23	5	60	Geoffrey Bodine	Power Team	Chevy	Joe Bessey Motorsports	397	0	running	94	28980
24	29	32	Mike Wallace	Ultra Wheels, Biagi Brothers	Ford	Ultra Motorsports	397	0	running	91	23455
25	14	12	Jeremy Mayfield	Mobil 1	Ford	Penske-Kranefuss Racing	396	0	running	88	38305
26	27	16	Kevin Lepage	TV Guide, Tim McGraw	Ford	Roush Racing	396	0	running	85	34180
27	31	10	Ricky Rudd	Tide	Ford	Rudd Performance Motorsports	396	0	running	82	33255
28	26	25	Wally Dallenbach, Jr.	Budweiser	Chevy	Hendrick Motorsports	396	0	running	79	33030
29	35	01	Ron Hornaday, Jr.	Tracfone	Chevy	SABCO Racing	396	0	running	76	22810
30	39	9	Steve Grissom	WCW	Ford	Melling Racing	395	0	running	73	26200
31	41	11	Brett Bodine	Paychex	Ford	Brett Bodine Racing	395	0	running	70	33190
32	40	66	Darrell Waltrip	Big Kmart, Route 66	Ford	Haas-Carter Motorsports	395	0	running	67	25130
33	42	41	David Green	Kodiak	Chevy	Larry Hedrick Motorsports	391	0	running	64	22595
34	19	22	Ward Burton	Caterpillar	Pontiac	Bill Davis Racing	389	0	running	61	29535
35	20	6	Mark Martin	Valvoline, Cummins	Ford	Roush Racing	366	1	engine	63	41000
36	17	94	Bill Elliott	McDonald's	Ford	Bill Elliott Racing	358	0	running	55	29465
37	11	23	Jimmy Spencer	Team Winston	Ford	Haas-Carter Motorsports	357	0	running	52	29430
38	36	7	Michael Waltrip	Philips Electronics	Chevy	Mattei Motorsports	346	0	running	49	29395
39	43	77	Robert Pressley	Jasper Engines & Transmissions	Ford	Jasper Motorsports	316	0	running	46	22360
40	6	24	Jeff Gordon	DuPont Automotive Finishes	Chevy	Hendrick Motorsports	311	56	transmission	48	50625
41	16	98	Rick Mast	Woody Woodpecker	Ford	Cale Yarborough Motorsports	175	0	running	40	22290
42	32	97	Chad Little	John Deere	Ford	Roush Racing	167	0	crash	37	29455
43	15	5	Terry Labonte	Kellogg's	Chevy	Hendrick Motorsports	54	0	crash	34	37245
Failed to qualify
44		45	Jack Sprague	AT&T / 10-10-345	Pontiac	Tyler Jet Motorsports					
45		71	Dave Marcis	RealTree Camouflage	Chevrolet	Marcis Auto Racing					
46		58	Hut Stricklin	Federated Auto Parts	Ford	SBIII Motorsports					
47		90	Stanton Barrett	Hills Brothers Coffee / Nesquik	Ford	Donlavey Racing					
48		91	Tom Baldwin	All INVICA-Shield	Chevrolet	LJ Racing					
DC		10	Dick Trickle	Tide	Ford	Rudd Performance Motorsports					

== Race Statistics ==
- Time of race: 2:53:04
- Average Speed: 104.006 miles per hour (167.381 km/h)
- Pole Speed: 125.465 miles per hour (201.916 km/h)
- Cautions: 6 for 45 laps
- Margin of Victory: 1.115 sec
- Lead changes: 13
- Percent of race run under caution: 11.2%
- Average green flag run: 50.7 laps
