= 1999 California 500 =

Race details
- Race 10 of 34 in the 1999 NASCAR Winston Cup Series season
- Date: May 2, 1999
- Official name: California 500
- Location: California Speedway, Fontana, California
- Course: Permanent racing facility
- Course length: 3.23 km (2.0 miles)
- Distance: 250 laps, 500 mi (804.672 km)
- Average speed: 150.276 miles per hour (241.846 km/h)

Pole position
Driver	Jeff Burton	Roush Racing
- Time: no time trials

Most laps led
Driver	Jeff Gordon	Hendrick Motorsports
- Laps: 151

Winner
No. 24	Jeff Gordon	Hendrick Motorsports

Television in the United States
- Network: ABC
- Announcers: Bob Jenkins, Benny Parsons and Ned Jarrett

The 1999 California 500 Presented by NAPA was a NASCAR Winston Cup Series race held on May 2, 1999, at California Speedway in Fontana, California. Contested at 250 laps on the 2-mile (3.2 km) speedway, it was the 10th race of the 1999 NASCAR Winston Cup Series season. Jeff Gordon of Hendrick Motorsports won the race.

== Background ==
The track, California Speedway, was a four-turn superspeedway that was 2 miles (3.2 km) long. The track's turns were banked from fourteen degrees, while the front stretch, the location of the finish line, was banked at eleven degrees. Unlike the front stretch, the backstraightaway was banked at three degrees.

== Top 10 results ==
Pos	No.	Driver	Team	Manufacturer
1	24	Jeff Gordon	Hendrick Motorsports	Chevrolet
2	99	Jeff Burton	Roush Racing	Ford
3	18	Bobby Labonte	Joe Gibbs Racing	Pontiac
4	20	Tony Stewart	Joe Gibbs Racing	Pontiac
5	88	Dale Jarrett	Robert Yates Racing	Ford
6	22	Ward Burton	Bill Davis Racing	Pontiac
7	12	Jeremy Mayfield	Penske-Kranefuss Racing	Ford
8	25	Wally Dallenbach Jr.	Hendrick Motorsports	Chevrolet
9	5	Terry Labonte	Hendrick Motorsports	Chevrolet
10	31	Mike Skinner	Richard Childress Racing	Chevrolet

== Race Statistics ==
- Time of race: 3:19:38
- Average Speed: 150.276 miles per hour (241.846 km/h)
- Pole Speed: no time trials
- Cautions: 5 for 23 laps
- Margin of Victory: 4.492 sec
- Lead changes: 28
- Percent of race run under caution: 9.2%
- Average green flag run: 37.8 laps

Previous race: 1999 DieHard 500	NASCAR Winston Cup Series; 1999 season	Next race: 1999 Pontiac Excitement 400
