= 1999 Pontiac Excitement 400 =

11th race of the 1999 NASCAR Winston Cup Series

Race details
- Race 11 of 34 in the 1999 NASCAR Winston Cup Series
- The 1999 Pontiac Excitement 400 program cover.
- Date: May 15, 1999
- Official name: 45th Annual Pontiac Excitement 400
- Location: Richmond, Virginia, Richmond International Raceway
- Course: Permanent racing facility
- Course length: 0.75 miles (1.21 km)
- Distance: 400 laps, 300 mi (482.803 km)
- Average speed: 100.102 miles per hour (161.099 km/h)

Pole position
Driver	Jeff Gordon	Hendrick Motorsports
- Time: 21.344

Most laps led
Driver	Jeff Burton	Roush Racing
- Laps: 104

Winner
No. 88	Dale Jarrett	Robert Yates Racing

Television in the United States
- Network: ESPN
- Announcers: Bob Jenkins, Benny Parsons, Ned Jarrett

Radio in the United States
- Radio: Motor Racing Network

The 1999 Pontiac Excitement 400 was the 11th stock car race of the 1999 NASCAR Winston Cup Series season and the 45th iteration of the event. The race was held on Saturday, May 15, 1999, in Richmond, Virginia, at Richmond International Raceway, a 0.75 miles (1.21 km) D-shaped oval. The race took the scheduled 400 laps to complete. At race's end, Robert Yates Racing driver Dale Jarrett would manage to make a pass for the lead with 32 to go and hold onto the lead to win his 19th career NASCAR Winston Cup Series victory and his first victory of the season. To fill out the podium, Roush Racing driver Mark Martin and Joe Gibbs Racing driver Bobby Labonte would finish second and third, respectively.

== Background ==
The layout of Richmond International Raceway, the venue where the race was at.

Richmond International Raceway (RIR) is a 3/4-mile (1.2 km), D-shaped, asphalt race track located just outside Richmond, Virginia in Henrico County. It hosts the Monster Energy NASCAR Cup Series and Xfinity Series. Known as "America's premier short track", it formerly hosted a NASCAR Camping World Truck Series race, an IndyCar Series race, and two USAC sprint car races.

=== Entry list ===
- (R) denotes rookie driver.

#	Driver	Team	Make
00	Buckshot Jones (R)	Buckshot Racing	Pontiac
1	Steve Park	Dale Earnhardt, Inc.	Chevrolet
2	Rusty Wallace	Penske-Kranefuss Racing	Ford
3	Dale Earnhardt	Richard Childress Racing	Chevrolet
4	Bobby Hamilton	Morgan–McClure Motorsports	Chevrolet
5	Terry Labonte	Hendrick Motorsports	Chevrolet
6	Mark Martin	Roush Racing	Ford
7	Michael Waltrip	Mattei Motorsports	Chevrolet
9	Jerry Nadeau	Melling Racing	Ford
10	Ricky Rudd	Rudd Performance Motorsports	Ford
11	Brett Bodine	Brett Bodine Racing	Ford
12	Jeremy Mayfield	Penske-Kranefuss Racing	Ford
16	Kevin Lepage	Roush Racing	Ford
18	Bobby Labonte	Joe Gibbs Racing	Pontiac
20	Tony Stewart (R)	Joe Gibbs Racing	Pontiac
21	Elliott Sadler (R)	Wood Brothers Racing	Ford
22	Ward Burton	Bill Davis Racing	Pontiac
23	Jimmy Spencer	Haas-Carter Motorsports	Ford
24	Jeff Gordon	Hendrick Motorsports	Chevrolet
25	Wally Dallenbach Jr.	Hendrick Motorsports	Chevrolet
26	Johnny Benson Jr.	Roush Racing	Ford
28	Kenny Irwin Jr.	Robert Yates Racing	Ford
30	Derrike Cope	Bahari Racing	Pontiac
31	Mike Skinner	Richard Childress Racing	Chevrolet
33	Ken Schrader	Andy Petree Racing	Chevrolet
36	Ernie Irvan	MB2 Motorsports	Pontiac
40	Sterling Marlin	Team SABCO	Chevrolet
41	David Green	Larry Hedrick Motorsports	Chevrolet
42	Joe Nemechek	Team SABCO	Chevrolet
43	John Andretti	Petty Enterprises	Pontiac
44	Kyle Petty	Petty Enterprises	Pontiac
45	Rich Bickle	Tyler Jet Motorsports	Pontiac
55	Kenny Wallace	Andy Petree Racing	Chevrolet
58	Ricky Craven	SBIII Motorsports	Ford
60	Geoff Bodine	Joe Bessey Racing	Chevrolet
66	Darrell Waltrip	Haas-Carter Motorsports	Ford
71	Dave Marcis	Marcis Auto Racing	Chevrolet
75	Ted Musgrave	Butch Mock Motorsports	Ford
77	Robert Pressley	Jasper Motorsports	Ford
88	Dale Jarrett	Robert Yates Racing	Ford
90	Hut Stricklin	Donlavey Racing	Ford
91	Dick Trickle	LJ Racing	Chevrolet
94	Bill Elliott	Bill Elliott Racing	Ford
97	Chad Little	Roush Racing	Ford
98	Rick Mast	Burdette Motorsports	Ford
99	Jeff Burton	Roush Racing	Ford
Official entry list

== Practice ==
=== First practice ===
The first practice session was held on Friday, May 14, at 11:00 AM EST. The session would last for one hour and 15 minutes. Rusty Wallace, driving for Penske-Kranefuss Racing, would set the fastest time in the session, with a lap of 21.379 and an average speed of 126.292 mph (203.247 km/h).

Pos.	#	Driver	Team	Make	Time	Speed
1	2	Rusty Wallace	Penske-Kranefuss Racing	Ford	21.379	126.292
2	43	John Andretti	Petty Enterprises	Pontiac	21.431	125.985
3	6	Mark Martin	Roush Racing	Ford	21.486	125.663
Full first practice results

=== Second practice ===
The second practice session was held on Friday, May 14, at 2:30 PM EST. The session would last for two hours. Bobby Labonte, driving for Joe Gibbs Racing, would set the fastest time in the session, with a lap of 21.305 and an average speed of 126.731 mph (203.954 km/h).

Pos.	#	Driver	Team	Make	Time	Speed
1	18	Bobby Labonte	Joe Gibbs Racing	Pontiac	21.305	126.731
2	6	Mark Martin	Roush Racing	Ford	21.329	126.588
3	43	John Andretti	Petty Enterprises	Pontiac	21.402	126.156
Full second practice results

== Qualifying ==
Qualifying was held on Saturday, May 15, at 1:00 PM EST. Each driver would have two laps to set a fastest time; the fastest of the two would count as their official qualifying lap. Positions 1-36 would be decided on time, while positions 37-43 would be based on provisionals. Six spots are awarded by the use of provisionals based on owner's points. The seventh is awarded to a past champion who has not otherwise qualified for the race. If no past champion needs the provisional, the next team in the owner points will be awarded a provisional.

Jeff Gordon, driving for Hendrick Motorsports, would win the pole, setting a time of 21.344 and an average speed of 126.499 miles per hour (203.580 km/h).

Three drivers would fail to qualify: Dave Marcis, Buckshot Jones, and Hut Stricklin.

=== Full qualifying results ===
Pos.	#	Driver	Team	Make	Time	Speed
1	24	Jeff Gordon	Hendrick Motorsports	Chevrolet	21.344	126.499
2	55	Kenny Wallace	Andy Petree Racing	Chevrolet	21.348	126.476
3	28	Kenny Irwin Jr.	Robert Yates Racing	Ford	21.404	126.145
4	44	Kyle Petty	Petty Enterprises	Pontiac	21.428	126.003
5	43	John Andretti	Petty Enterprises	Pontiac	21.434	125.968
6	2	Rusty Wallace	Penske-Kranefuss Racing	Ford	21.455	125.845
7	31	Mike Skinner	Richard Childress Racing	Chevrolet	21.458	125.827
8	18	Bobby Labonte	Joe Gibbs Racing	Pontiac	21.474	125.733
9	10	Ricky Rudd	Rudd Performance Motorsports	Ford	21.498	124.593
10	99	Jeff Burton	Roush Racing	Ford	21.511	125.517
11	98	Rick Mast	Burdette Motorsports	Ford	21.540	125.348
12	6	Mark Martin	Roush Racing	Ford	21.562	125.220
13	33	Ken Schrader	Andy Petree Racing	Chevrolet	21.570	125.174
14	97	Chad Little	Roush Racing	Ford	21.582	125.104
15	4	Bobby Hamilton	Morgan–McClure Motorsports	Chevrolet	21.594	125.035
16	40	Sterling Marlin	Team SABCO	Chevrolet	21.595	125.029
17	1	Steve Park	Dale Earnhardt, Inc.	Chevrolet	21.604	124.977
18	21	Elliott Sadler (R)	Wood Brothers Racing	Ford	21.623	124.867
19	94	Bill Elliott	Bill Elliott Racing	Ford	21.626	124.850
20	22	Ward Burton	Bill Davis Racing	Pontiac	21.634	124.804
21	88	Dale Jarrett	Robert Yates Racing	Ford	21.643	124.752
22	58	Ricky Craven	SBIII Motorsports	Ford	21.643	124.752
23	42	Joe Nemechek	Team SABCO	Chevrolet	21.644	124.746
24	66	Darrell Waltrip	Haas-Carter Motorsports	Ford	21.647	124.729
25	36	Ernie Irvan	MB2 Motorsports	Pontiac	21.648	124.723
26	26	Johnny Benson Jr.	Roush Racing	Ford	21.649	124.717
27	77	Robert Pressley	Jasper Motorsports	Ford	21.678	124.550
28	12	Jeremy Mayfield	Penske-Kranefuss Racing	Ford	21.685	124.510
29	60	Geoff Bodine	Joe Bessey Racing	Chevrolet	21.685	124.510
30	20	Tony Stewart (R)	Joe Gibbs Racing	Pontiac	21.686	124.504
31	91	Dick Trickle	LJ Racing	Chevrolet	21.687	124.499
32	5	Terry Labonte	Hendrick Motorsports	Chevrolet	21.701	124.418
33	23	Jimmy Spencer	Haas-Carter Motorsports	Ford	21.706	124.390
34	11	Brett Bodine	Brett Bodine Racing	Ford	21.706	124.390
35	9	Jerry Nadeau	Melling Racing	Ford	21.727	124.269
36	30	Derrike Cope	Bahari Racing	Pontiac	21.727	124.269
Provisionals
37	3	Dale Earnhardt	Richard Childress Racing	Chevrolet	-*	-*
38	7	Michael Waltrip	Mattei Motorsports	Chevrolet	-*	-*
39	25	Wally Dallenbach Jr.	Hendrick Motorsports	Chevrolet	-*	-*
40	16	Kevin Lepage	Roush Racing	Ford	-*	-*
41	75	Ted Musgrave	Butch Mock Motorsports	Ford	-*	-*
42	45	Rich Bickle	Tyler Jet Motorsports	Pontiac	-*	-*
43	41	David Green	Larry Hedrick Motorsports	Chevrolet	-*	-*
Failed to qualify
44	71	Dave Marcis	Marcis Auto Racing	Chevrolet	21.808	123.808
45	00	Buckshot Jones (R)	Buckshot Racing	Pontiac	21.921	123.170
46	90	Hut Stricklin	Donlavey Racing	Ford	22.038	122.516
Official qualifying results

*Time not available.

== Race results ==
Fin	St	#	Driver	Team	Make	Laps	Led	Status	Pts	Winnings
1	21	88	Dale Jarrett	Robert Yates Racing	Ford	400	32	running	180	$169,715
2	12	6	Mark Martin	Roush Racing	Ford	400	74	running	175	$89,700
3	8	18	Bobby Labonte	Joe Gibbs Racing	Pontiac	400	71	running	170	$69,775
4	15	4	Bobby Hamilton	Morgan–McClure Motorsports	Chevrolet	400	0	running	160	$64,875
5	6	2	Rusty Wallace	Penske-Kranefuss Racing	Ford	400	0	running	155	$49,450
6	23	42	Joe Nemechek	Team SABCO	Chevrolet	400	0	running	150	$49,250
7	4	44	Kyle Petty	Petty Enterprises	Pontiac	400	0	running	146	$39,625
8	37	3	Dale Earnhardt	Richard Childress Racing	Chevrolet	400	0	running	142	$48,540
9	20	22	Ward Burton	Bill Davis Racing	Pontiac	400	9	running	143	$41,175
10	42	45	Rich Bickle	Tyler Jet Motorsports	Pontiac	400	0	running	134	$35,965
11	41	75	Ted Musgrave	Butch Mock Motorsports	Ford	400	0	running	130	$34,475
12	19	94	Bill Elliott	Bill Elliott Racing	Ford	400	0	running	127	$36,750
13	40	16	Kevin Lepage	Roush Racing	Ford	399	0	running	124	$36,975
14	13	33	Ken Schrader	Andy Petree Racing	Chevrolet	399	0	running	121	$36,175
15	30	20	Tony Stewart (R)	Joe Gibbs Racing	Pontiac	399	0	running	118	$27,225
16	11	98	Rick Mast	Burdette Motorsports	Ford	399	0	running	115	$28,800
17	29	60	Geoff Bodine	Joe Bessey Racing	Chevrolet	399	0	running	112	$23,900
18	16	40	Sterling Marlin	Team SABCO	Chevrolet	399	0	running	109	$34,550
19	22	58	Ricky Craven	SBIII Motorsports	Ford	399	0	running	106	$23,625
20	39	25	Wally Dallenbach Jr.	Hendrick Motorsports	Chevrolet	399	0	running	103	$36,740
21	35	9	Jerry Nadeau	Melling Racing	Ford	399	0	running	100	$28,250
22	38	7	Michael Waltrip	Mattei Motorsports	Chevrolet	398	0	running	97	$33,725
23	18	21	Elliott Sadler (R)	Wood Brothers Racing	Ford	398	0	running	94	$34,250
24	28	12	Jeremy Mayfield	Penske-Kranefuss Racing	Ford	397	0	running	91	$37,900
25	24	66	Darrell Waltrip	Haas-Carter Motorsports	Ford	395	1	running	93	$22,750
26	32	5	Terry Labonte	Hendrick Motorsports	Chevrolet	395	0	running	85	$37,625
27	27	77	Robert Pressley	Jasper Motorsports	Ford	392	0	running	82	$26,100
28	26	26	Johnny Benson Jr.	Roush Racing	Ford	390	0	running	79	$32,975
29	33	23	Jimmy Spencer	Haas-Carter Motorsports	Ford	390	0	running	76	32,350
30	7	31	Mike Skinner	Richard Childress Racing	Chevrolet	388	67	running	78	$35,950
31	1	24	Jeff Gordon	Hendrick Motorsports	Chevrolet	388	18	running	75	$54,275
32	31	91	Dick Trickle	LJ Racing	Chevrolet	387	0	running	67	$25,025
33	25	36	Ernie Irvan	MB2 Motorsports	Pontiac	363	0	running	64	$31,475
34	17	1	Steve Park	Dale Earnhardt, Inc.	Chevrolet	359	0	running	61	$28,925
35	14	97	Chad Little	Roush Racing	Ford	352	0	running	58	$28,875
36	9	10	Ricky Rudd	Rudd Performance Motorsports	Ford	345	0	running	55	$28,825
37	10	99	Jeff Burton	Roush Racing	Ford	324	104	running	62	$40,175
38	34	11	Brett Bodine	Brett Bodine Racing	Ford	322	0	running	49	$28,825
39	5	43	John Andretti	Petty Enterprises	Pontiac	242	24	handling	51	$36,675
40	3	28	Kenny Irwin Jr.	Robert Yates Racing	Ford	197	0	engine	43	$28,625
41	2	55	Kenny Wallace	Andy Petree Racing	Chevrolet	182	0	engine	40	$22,075
42	36	30	Derrike Cope	Bahari Racing	Pontiac	115	0	crash	37	$21,530
43	43	41	David Green	Larry Hedrick Motorsports	Chevrolet	105	0	engine	34	$21,700
Failed to qualify
44		71	Dave Marcis	Marcis Auto Racing	Chevrolet					
45		00	Buckshot Jones (R)	Buckshot Racing	Pontiac					
46		90	Hut Stricklin	Donlavey Racing	Ford					
Official race results

Previous race: 1999 California 500	NASCAR Winston Cup Series; 1999 season	Next race: 1999 Coca-Cola 600
