= Bill Ingle =

American stock car racing crew chief and driver

- Born: April 21, 1956 (age 70); Concord, North Carolina, U.S.

NASCAR O'Reilly Auto Parts Series career
- 3 races run over 2 years
- Best finish: 65th (1987)
- First race: 1987 AC Delco 200 (Rockingham)
- Last race: 1996 Stanley 200 (Loudon)
Wins	Top tens	Poles
0	0	0

Bill Ingle (born April 21, 1956, in Concord, North Carolina) is an American former stock car driver, crew chief, and racing analyst.

== Crew chief career ==
Ingle states that he could "pull an engine apart and put it together" at the age of ten. He began his career in NASCAR in 1983 as a mechanic with Junior Johnson & Associates; he remained with the team until the 1987 season, before moving to join AK Racing and Alan Kulwicki. Ingle joined Bahari Racing late in the 1989 season, remaining with the team through 1992. After taking a hiatus from the sport in 1993, Ingle was named crew chief for Rudd Performance Motorsports, where he helped Ricky Rudd establish his team as an owner-driver.

In 1996, Ingle moved to Diamond Ridge Motorsports, becoming crew chief for the No. 29 Chevrolet. He remained with the team through the first half of the 1997 season, before moving to Stavola Brothers Racing, then rejoining Rudd in 1998 following the Stavola team's failing to qualify for the 1998 Daytona 500. After the first four races of the 1999 season, Ingle left the team; shortly afterwards he joined Tyler Jet Motorsports and driver Rich Bickle as crew chief, but left the team after only three races.

In 2000, Ingle joined Morgan-Dollar Motorsports as crew chief of the No. 46 truck in the Craftsman Truck Series; he started the 2001 season with team, before leaving after two races.

Ingle then joined Fox Sports as a commentator on NASCAR Today, as well as serving as team manager for Haas CNC Racing; however halfway through the 2004 season, he returned to crew chief duties as crew chief for the team's No. 0 and driver Ward Burton. With four races left in the season Ingle moved to being crew chief for the team's No. 00 Busch Series team; after the 2006 season he resumed his role as team manager, but was released by the team in December.

== Driving career ==
In addition to his crew chief duties, Ingle twice attempted to break into the ranks of NASCAR drivers, competing in the second-tier Busch Series. His debut in the series came in 1987 at Rockingham Speedway in the AC Delco 200 where he finished 26th; Ingle's second attempt at a driving career came in 1996, when he attempted three races in the No. 29 Chevrolet for Diamond Ridge Motorsports; he failed to qualify at Hickory Motor Speedway, but made races at South Boston Speedway and New Hampshire International Speedway, with a best finish at South Boston of 22nd.

== Motorsports career results ==
=== NASCAR ===
(key) (Bold - Pole position awarded by qualifying time. Italics - Pole position earned by points standings or practice time. * – Most laps led.)

==== Busch Series ====
NASCAR Busch Series results
Year	Team	No.	Make	1	2	3	4	5	6	7	8	9	10	11	12	13	14	15	16	17	18	19	20	21	22	23	24	25	26	27	NBSC	Pts	Ref
1987	Carter-Mays	78	Pontiac	DAY	HCY	MAR	DAR	BRI	LGY	SBO	CLT	DOV	IRP	ROU	JFC	OXF	SBO	HCY	RAL	LGY	ROU	BRI	JFC	DAR	RCH	DOV	MAR	CLT	CAR; 26	MAR	65th	85	
1996	Diamond Ridge Motorsports	29	Chevy	DAY	CAR	RCH	ATL	NSV	DAR	BRI	HCY; DNQ	NZH	CLT	DOV	SBO; 22	MYB	GLN	MLW	NHA; 26	TAL	IRP	MCH	BRI	DAR	RCH	DOV	CLT	CAR	HOM		71st	182	
