= Tony Glover (NASCAR) =

American crew chief

Anthony Glover (born April 17, 1957 in Kingsport, Tennessee) is an American race mechanic, crew chief, and manager. He has won the Daytona 500 three times as a crew chief in the NASCAR Sprint Cup Series. He is the son of former NASCAR Late Model Sportsman champion Gene Glover and most recently served as the crew chief of the No. 33 Circle Sport Chevrolet in the NASCAR Sprint Cup Series. He is currently the director of NASCAR's Touring Series, a position he has held since July 30, 2013.

== Morgan-McClure ==
Glover's career began at the age of sixteen, working as the crew chief on his father's Late Model Sportsman pit crew. In 1983, he took a similar position with the Winston Cup team Morgan-McClure Motorsports's #4 Chevrolet entry, where he would remain for fourteen years. After seven seasons, Glover and Morgan-McClure earned their first Cup victory with Ernie Irvan at Bristol Motor Speedway in 1990. They followed that up with a victory in the 1991 Daytona 500. After accumulating five more victories together, Irvan departed Morgan-McClure for Robert Yates Racing. He would be replaced for the 1994 season by Sterling Marlin who won the Daytona 500 with Glover in their first outing together. Glover and Marlin would repeat that Daytona victory in 1995 and accumulated four additional wins over the next two seasons.

== Sabates/Ganassi ==
Late in the 1996 season, Glover was let go from Morgan-McClure and joined SABCO Racing to serve as team manager and crew chief for rookie Robby Gordon. Shortly into the 1997 season, Glover left his crew chief post to focus on his team manager duties. He reunited with Marlin, who joined SABCO, in 1998 for a few races as interim crew chief where they had two fourteenth-place finishes. After a short stint as co-crew chief of Marlin's car with Corrie Stott in 1999, Glover became permanent crew chief of the No. 42 SABCO entry driven by Joe Nemechek. Together, they earned three pole positions and Nemechek's first Cup victory at New Hampshire International Speedway. Glover served as crew chief for Nemechek's replacement for the 2000 season, Kenny Irwin Jr., until Irwin was killed in a practice accident at New Hampshire. He remained as crew chief for the rest of the 2000 season with Irwin's team (now renumbered No. 01). He did not serve as crew chief for a team again until late 2004, when he rejoined Marlin's team. They had a fourth-place finish together at Martinsville Speedway.

Glover remained with the team until an organizational shakeup in late 2011.

== Circle Sport ==
Glover was hired by start-up team Circle Sport early in the 2012 season, serving as crew chief for rookie drivers Stephen Leicht and Cole Whitt. Leicht won Rookie of the Year honors for the 2012 season. He left the team at the end of the season.
