= Brian Whitesell =

Personal information
- Nationality: American
- Born: April 23, 1964 (age 62)

Sport
- Country: United States
- Sport: NASCAR Cup Series
- Team: No. 9/No. 24 Hendrick Motorsports

Brian Whitesell (born April 23, 1964) is an American team manager in the NASCAR Cup Series from Stuarts Draft, Virginia. He is the team manager for the Hendrick Motorsports No. 9 team of Chase Elliott and the No. 24 team of William Byron. He has been part of eight NASCAR Cup Series championship teams (1992, 1995, 1996, 1997, 1998, 2001, 2006 and 2007).

== Early involvement in racing ==
Whitesell became involved in racing as a senior at Virginia Tech. He had a senior class project involving the design and construction a Mini Baja racecar through the Society of Automotive Engineers (SAE). After graduation in 1987, he went to work at Mack Trucks in Allentown, Pennsylvania, as a mechanical engineer. Whitesell transferred to Mack Trucks' office in Columbia, South Carolina. Whitesell used the office to volunteer for Alan Kulwicki's underfunded team on weekends as an attempt to get into motorsports in 1992. He drove the team's hauler, spotted, and scored for the team. He was part of Kulwicki's championship team.

== Hendrick Motorsports ==
Whitesell joined Hendrick Motorsports in 1993 as a transporter driver, timer/scorer, and chassis technical on rookie Jeff Gordon's No. 24 team. He began using his mechanical engineering degree in 1994 as one of the first engineers in NASCAR. He was named the Western Auto Mechanic of the Year in 1997. The team won three championships in five years. In September 1999, Whitesell was named the crew chief for Gordon after Ray Evernham left. The No. 24 team won two of the next seven races. After the season, he was named team manager of the No. 24 team, and the team won the 2001 championship.

Hendrick Motorsports added a second team in 2002 in the No. 48 car driven by Jimmie Johnson. Whitesell oversaw the growth the teams. Both teams finished in the Top 5 in points in both 2002 and 2003. The teams finished second and third in 2004. In 2005 Whitesell was named the team manager for the No. 5 car driven by Kyle Busch, the No. 25 car driven by Brian Vickers, and the No. 44 car driven part-time by Terry Labonte.

Announced on May 28, 2009, Whitesell filled in as crew chief for one race, the May 31 running of the Autism Speaks 400 at Dover International Speedway, for Dale Earnhardt Jr.

In 2015, Whitesell rejoined Gordon's team as a co-spotter for the Toyota/Save Mart 350 at Sonoma Raceway.
