= 1999 Food City 500 =

Seventh race of the 1999 NASCAR Winston Cup Series

Race details
- Race 7 of 34 in the 1999 NASCAR Winston Cup Series
- The 1999 Food City 500 program cover.
- Date: April 11, 1999
- Official name: 39th Annual Food City 500
- Location: Bristol, Tennessee, Bristol Motor Speedway
- Course: Permanent racing facility
- Course length: 0.533 miles (0.858 km)
- Distance: 500 laps, 266.5 mi (428.89 km)
- Average speed: 93.363 miles per hour (150.253 km/h)

Pole position
| Driver | Rusty Wallace | Penske-Kranefuss Racing |
- Time: 14.954

Most laps led
| Driver | Rusty Wallace | Penske-Kranefuss Racing |
- Laps: 425

Winner
| No. 2 | Rusty Wallace | Penske-Kranefuss Racing |

Television in the United States
- Network: ESPN
- Announcers: Bob Jenkins, Ned Jarrett, Benny Parsons

Radio in the United States
- Radio: Performance Racing Network

The 1999 Food City 500 was the seventh stock car race of the 1999 NASCAR Winston Cup Series season and the 39th iteration of the event. The race was held on Sunday, April 11, 1999, in Bristol, Tennessee at Bristol Motor Speedway, a 0.533 miles (0.858 km) permanent oval-shaped racetrack. The race took the scheduled 500 laps to complete. At race's end, Penske-Kranefuss Racing driver Rusty Wallace would dominate most of the race to take home his 49th career NASCAR Winston Cup Series victory and his only win of the season. To fill out the podium, Roush Racing driver Mark Martin and Robert Yates Racing driver Dale Jarrett would finish second and third, respectively.

== Background ==
The layout of Bristol Motor Speedway, the venue where the race was held.

The Bristol Motor Speedway, formerly known as Bristol International Raceway and Bristol Raceway, is a NASCAR short track venue located in Bristol, Tennessee. Constructed in 1960, it held its first NASCAR race on July 30, 1961. Despite its short length, Bristol is among the most popular tracks on the NASCAR schedule because of its distinct features, which include extraordinarily steep banking, an all concrete surface, two pit roads, and stadium-like seating. It has also been named one of the loudest NASCAR tracks.

=== Entry list ===
- (R) denotes rookie driver.

| # | Driver | Team | Make |
|---|---|---|---|
| 00 | Buckshot Jones (R) | Buckshot Racing | Pontiac |
| 1 | Steve Park | Dale Earnhardt, Inc. | Chevrolet |
| 2 | Rusty Wallace | Penske-Kranefuss Racing | Ford |
| 3 | Dale Earnhardt | Richard Childress Racing | Chevrolet |
| 4 | Bobby Hamilton | Morgan–McClure Motorsports | Chevrolet |
| 5 | Terry Labonte | Hendrick Motorsports | Chevrolet |
| 6 | Mark Martin | Roush Racing | Ford |
| 7 | Michael Waltrip | Mattei Motorsports | Chevrolet |
| 9 | Jerry Nadeau | Melling Racing | Ford |
| 10 | Ricky Rudd | Rudd Performance Motorsports | Ford |
| 11 | Brett Bodine | Brett Bodine Racing | Ford |
| 12 | Jeremy Mayfield | Penske-Kranefuss Racing | Ford |
| 16 | Kevin Lepage | Roush Racing | Ford |
| 18 | Bobby Labonte | Joe Gibbs Racing | Pontiac |
| 20 | Tony Stewart (R) | Joe Gibbs Racing | Pontiac |
| 21 | Elliott Sadler (R) | Wood Brothers Racing | Ford |
| 22 | Ward Burton | Bill Davis Racing | Pontiac |
| 23 | Jimmy Spencer | Haas-Carter Motorsports | Ford |
| 24 | Jeff Gordon | Hendrick Motorsports | Chevrolet |
| 25 | Wally Dallenbach Jr. | Hendrick Motorsports | Chevrolet |
| 26 | Johnny Benson Jr. | Roush Racing | Ford |
| 28 | Kenny Irwin Jr. | Robert Yates Racing | Ford |
| 30 | Derrike Cope | Bahari Racing | Pontiac |
| 31 | Mike Skinner | Richard Childress Racing | Chevrolet |
| 33 | Ken Schrader | Andy Petree Racing | Chevrolet |
| 36 | Ernie Irvan | MB2 Motorsports | Pontiac |
| 40 | Sterling Marlin | Team SABCO | Chevrolet |
| 41 | David Green | Larry Hedrick Motorsports | Chevrolet |
| 42 | Joe Nemechek | Team SABCO | Chevrolet |
| 43 | John Andretti | Petty Enterprises | Pontiac |
| 44 | Kyle Petty | Petty Enterprises | Pontiac |
| 45 | Rich Bickle | Tyler Jet Motorsports | Pontiac |
| 55 | Kenny Wallace | Andy Petree Racing | Chevrolet |
| 58 | Ricky Craven | SBIII Motorsports | Ford |
| 60 | Geoff Bodine | Joe Bessey Racing | Chevrolet |
| 66 | Darrell Waltrip | Haas-Carter Motorsports | Ford |
| 71 | Dave Marcis | Marcis Auto Racing | Chevrolet |
| 75 | Ted Musgrave | Butch Mock Motorsports | Ford |
| 77 | Robert Pressley | Jasper Motorsports | Ford |
| 88 | Dale Jarrett | Robert Yates Racing | Ford |
| 90 | Stanton Barrett | Donlavey Racing | Ford |
| 91 | Dick Trickle | LJ Racing | Chevrolet |
| 94 | Bill Elliott | Bill Elliott Racing | Ford |
| 97 | Chad Little | Roush Racing | Ford |
| 98 | Rick Mast | Burdette Motorsports | Ford |
| 99 | Jeff Burton | Roush Racing | Ford |
Official entry list

== Practice ==
=== First practice ===
The first practice session was held on Friday, April 9, at 11:00 AM EST. The session would last for two hours and 25 minutes. Bobby Hamilton, driving for Morgan–McClure Motorsports, would set the fastest time in the session, with a lap of 15.406 and an average speed of 124.549 mph (200.442 km/h).

| Pos. | # | Driver | Team | Make | Time | Speed |
|---|---|---|---|---|---|---|
| 1 | 4 | Bobby Hamilton | Morgan–McClure Motorsports | Chevrolet | 15.406 | 124.549 |
| 2 | 10 | Ricky Rudd | Rudd Performance Motorsports | Ford | 15.483 | 123.929 |
| 3 | 66 | Darrell Waltrip | Haas-Carter Motorsports | Ford | 15.501 | 123.786 |
Full first practice results

=== Second practice ===
The second practice session was held on Friday, April 9, at 1:15 PM EST. The session would last for 45 minutes. Rusty Wallace, driving for Penske-Kranefuss Racing, would set the fastest time in the session, with a lap of 15.339 and an average speed of 125.092 mph (201.316 km/h).

| Pos. | # | Driver | Team | Make | Time | Speed |
|---|---|---|---|---|---|---|
| 1 | 2 | Rusty Wallace | Penske-Kranefuss Racing | Ford | 15.339 | 125.092 |
| 2 | 24 | Jeff Gordon | Hendrick Motorsports | Chevrolet | 15.399 | 124.605 |
| 3 | 4 | Bobby Hamilton | Morgan–McClure Motorsports | Chevrolet | 15.445 | 124.234 |
Full second practice results

=== Third practice ===
The third practice session was held on Saturday, April 10, at 9:30 AM EST. The session would last for one hour. Joe Nemechek, driving for Team SABCO, would set the fastest time in the session, with a lap of 15.564 and an average speed of 123.284 mph (198.406 km/h).

| Pos. | # | Driver | Team | Make | Time | Speed |
|---|---|---|---|---|---|---|
| 1 | 42 | Joe Nemechek | Team SABCO | Chevrolet | 15.564 | 123.284 |
| 2 | 1 | Steve Park | Dale Earnhardt, Inc. | Chevrolet | 15.593 | 123.055 |
| 3 | 91 | Dick Trickle | LJ Racing | Chevrolet | 15.598 | 123.015 |
Full third practice results

=== Final practice ===
The final practice session, sometimes referred to as Happy Hour, was held on Saturday, April 10, after the preliminary 1999 Moore's Snacks 250. The session would last for one hour. Bobby Labonte, driving for Joe Gibbs Racing, would set the fastest time in the session, with a lap of 15.956 and an average speed of 120.255 mph (193.532 km/h).

| Pos. | # | Driver | Team | Make | Time | Speed |
|---|---|---|---|---|---|---|
| 1 | 18 | Bobby Labonte | Joe Gibbs Racing | Pontiac | 15.956 | 120.255 |
| 2 | 10 | Ricky Rudd | Rudd Performance Motorsports | Ford | 15.961 | 120.218 |
| 3 | 6 | Mark Martin | Roush Racing | Ford | 16.046 | 119.581 |
Full Happy Hour practice results

== Qualifying ==
Qualifying was split into two rounds. The first round was held on Friday, April 9, at 3:00 PM EST. Each driver would have two laps to set a fastest time; the fastest of the two would count as their official qualifying lap. During the first round, the top 25 drivers in the round would be guaranteed a starting spot in the race. If a driver was not able to guarantee a spot in the first round, they had the option to scrub their time from the first round and try and run a faster lap time in a second round qualifying run, held on Saturday, April 10, at 11:30 AM EST. As with the first round, each driver would have two laps to set a fastest time; the fastest of the two would count as their official qualifying lap. Positions 26-36 would be decided on time, while positions 37-43 would be based on provisionals. Six spots are awarded by the use of provisionals based on owner's points. The seventh is awarded to a past champion who has not otherwise qualified for the race. If no past champion needs the provisional, the next team in the owner points will be awarded a provisional.

Rusty Wallace, driving for Penske-Kranefuss Racing, would win the pole, setting a time of 15.333 and an average speed of 194.957 miles per hour (313.753 km/h).

Three drivers would fail to qualify: Rich Bickle, Stanton Barrett, and Derrike Cope.

=== Full qualifying results ===
| Pos. | # | Driver | Team | Make | Time | Speed |
|---|---|---|---|---|---|---|
| 1 | 2 | Rusty Wallace | Penske-Kranefuss Racing | Ford | 15.333 | 125.142 |
| 2 | 24 | Jeff Gordon | Hendrick Motorsports | Chevrolet | 15.353 | 124.979 |
| 3 | 18 | Bobby Labonte | Joe Gibbs Racing | Pontiac | 15.414 | 124.484 |
| 4 | 20 | Tony Stewart | Joe Gibbs Racing | Pontiac | 15.439 | 124.283 |
| 5 | 10 | Ricky Rudd | Rudd Performance Motorsports | Ford | 15.439 | 124.283 |
| 6 | 55 | Kenny Wallace | Andy Petree Racing | Chevrolet | 15.442 | 124.259 |
| 7 | 4 | Bobby Hamilton | Morgan–McClure Motorsports | Chevrolet | 15.461 | 124.106 |
| 8 | 6 | Mark Martin | Roush Racing | Ford | 15.472 | 124.018 |
| 9 | 58 | Ricky Craven | SBIII Motorsports | Ford | 15.481 | 123.945 |
| 10 | 28 | Kenny Irwin Jr. | Robert Yates Racing | Ford | 15.482 | 123.937 |
| 11 | 77 | Robert Pressley | Jasper Motorsports | Ford | 15.485 | 123.913 |
| 12 | 66 | Darrell Waltrip | Haas-Carter Motorsports | Ford | 15.492 | 123.857 |
| 13 | 75 | Ted Musgrave | Butch Mock Motorsports | Ford | 15.516 | 123.666 |
| 14 | 44 | Kyle Petty | Petty Enterprises | Pontiac | 15.517 | 123.658 |
| 15 | 25 | Wally Dallenbach Jr. | Hendrick Motorsports | Chevrolet | 15.520 | 123.634 |
| 16 | 88 | Dale Jarrett | Robert Yates Racing | Ford | 15.525 | 123.594 |
| 17 | 21 | Elliott Sadler | Wood Brothers Racing | Ford | 15.529 | 123.562 |
| 18 | 11 | Brett Bodine | Brett Bodine Racing | Ford | 15.533 | 123.531 |
| 19 | 9 | Jerry Nadeau | Melling Racing | Ford | 15.533 | 123.531 |
| 20 | 33 | Ken Schrader | Andy Petree Racing | Chevrolet | 15.539 | 123.483 |
| 21 | 23 | Jimmy Spencer | Haas-Carter Motorsports | Ford | 15.550 | 123.395 |
| 22 | 71 | Dave Marcis | Marcis Auto Racing | Chevrolet | 15.562 | 123.300 |
| 23 | 94 | Bill Elliott | Bill Elliott Racing | Ford | 15.568 | 123.253 |
| 24 | 40 | Sterling Marlin | Team SABCO | Chevrolet | 15.571 | 123.229 |
| 25 | 60 | Geoff Bodine | Joe Bessey Racing | Chevrolet | 15.577 | 123.182 |
| 26 | 43 | John Andretti | Petty Enterprises | Pontiac | 15.486 | 123.905 |
| 27 | 42 | Joe Nemechek | Team SABCO | Chevrolet | 15.558 | 123.332 |
| 28 | 16 | Kevin Lepage | Roush Racing | Ford | 15.572 | 123.221 |
| 29 | 91 | Dick Trickle | LJ Racing | Chevrolet | 15.576 | 123.190 |
| 30 | 5 | Terry Labonte | Hendrick Motorsports | Chevrolet | 15.590 | 123.079 |
| 31 | 99 | Jeff Burton | Roush Racing | Ford | 15.593 | 123.055 |
| 32 | 98 | Rick Mast | Burdette Motorsports | Ford | 15.596 | 123.032 |
| 33 | 31 | Mike Skinner | Richard Childress Racing | Chevrolet | 15.599 | 123.008 |
| 34 | 3 | Dale Earnhardt | Richard Childress Racing | Chevrolet | 15.600 | 123.000 |
| 35 | 41 | David Green | Larry Hedrick Motorsports | Chevrolet | 15.600 | 123.000 |
| 36 | 00 | Buckshot Jones | Buckshot Racing | Pontiac | 15.602 | 122.984 |
Provisionals
| 37 | 12 | Jeremy Mayfield | Penske-Kranefuss Racing | Ford | -* | -* |
| 38 | 22 | Ward Burton | Bill Davis Racing | Pontiac | -* | -* |
| 39 | 7 | Michael Waltrip | Mattei Motorsports | Chevrolet | -* | -* |
| 40 | 97 | Chad Little | Roush Racing | Ford | -* | -* |
| 41 | 36 | Ernie Irvan | MB2 Motorsports | Pontiac | -* | -* |
| 42 | 26 | Johnny Benson Jr. | Roush Racing | Ford | -* | -* |
| 43 | 1 | Steve Park | Dale Earnhardt, Inc. | Chevrolet | -* | -* |
Failed to qualify
| 44 | 45 | Rich Bickle | Tyler Jet Motorsports | Pontiac | 15.653 | 122.584 |
| 45 | 90 | Stanton Barrett | Donlavey Racing | Ford | 15.736 | 121.937 |
| 46 | 30 | Derrike Cope | Bahari Racing | Pontiac | 15.813 | 121.343 |
Official qualifying results

*Time not available.

== Race results ==
| Fin | St | # | Driver | Team | Make | Laps | Led | Status | Pts | Winnings |
|---|---|---|---|---|---|---|---|---|---|---|
| 1 | 1 | 2 | Rusty Wallace | Penske-Kranefuss Racing | Ford | 500 | 425 | running | 185 | $87,435 |
| 2 | 8 | 6 | Mark Martin | Roush Racing | Ford | 500 | 7 | running | 175 | $73,585 |
| 3 | 16 | 88 | Dale Jarrett | Robert Yates Racing | Ford | 500 | 0 | running | 165 | $68,650 |
| 4 | 26 | 43 | John Andretti | Petty Enterprises | Pontiac | 500 | 0 | running | 160 | $64,295 |
| 5 | 31 | 99 | Jeff Burton | Roush Racing | Ford | 500 | 0 | running | 155 | $57,335 |
| 6 | 2 | 24 | Jeff Gordon | Hendrick Motorsports | Chevrolet | 500 | 0 | running | 150 | $55,970 |
| 7 | 13 | 75 | Ted Musgrave | Butch Mock Motorsports | Ford | 500 | 0 | running | 146 | $40,245 |
| 8 | 14 | 44 | Kyle Petty | Petty Enterprises | Pontiac | 500 | 0 | running | 142 | $36,995 |
| 9 | 38 | 22 | Ward Burton | Bill Davis Racing | Pontiac | 500 | 11 | running | 143 | $49,265 |
| 10 | 34 | 3 | Dale Earnhardt | Richard Childress Racing | Chevrolet | 500 | 0 | running | 134 | $48,630 |
| 11 | 10 | 28 | Kenny Irwin Jr. | Robert Yates Racing | Ford | 499 | 0 | running | 130 | $43,870 |
| 12 | 39 | 7 | Michael Waltrip | Mattei Motorsports | Chevrolet | 499 | 2 | running | 132 | $39,365 |
| 13 | 30 | 5 | Terry Labonte | Hendrick Motorsports | Chevrolet | 499 | 0 | running | 124 | $43,290 |
| 14 | 24 | 40 | Sterling Marlin | Team SABCO | Chevrolet | 499 | 0 | running | 121 | $38,615 |
| 15 | 4 | 20 | Tony Stewart (R) | Joe Gibbs Racing | Pontiac | 498 | 55 | running | 123 | $48,505 |
| 16 | 6 | 55 | Kenny Wallace | Andy Petree Racing | Chevrolet | 498 | 0 | running | 115 | $28,390 |
| 17 | 21 | 23 | Jimmy Spencer | Haas-Carter Motorsports | Ford | 498 | 0 | running | 112 | $38,040 |
| 18 | 7 | 4 | Bobby Hamilton | Morgan–McClure Motorsports | Chevrolet | 498 | 0 | running | 109 | $42,140 |
| 19 | 32 | 98 | Rick Mast | Burdette Motorsports | Ford | 498 | 0 | running | 106 | $30,830 |
| 20 | 20 | 33 | Ken Schrader | Andy Petree Racing | Chevrolet | 498 | 0 | running | 103 | $40,440 |
| 21 | 33 | 31 | Mike Skinner | Richard Childress Racing | Chevrolet | 497 | 0 | running | 100 | $37,740 |
| 22 | 18 | 11 | Brett Bodine | Brett Bodine Racing | Ford | 497 | 0 | running | 97 | $37,490 |
| 23 | 43 | 1 | Steve Park | Dale Earnhardt, Inc. | Chevrolet | 497 | 0 | running | 94 | $36,965 |
| 24 | 40 | 97 | Chad Little | Roush Racing | Ford | 497 | 0 | running | 91 | $36,865 |
| 25 | 23 | 94 | Bill Elliott | Bill Elliott Racing | Ford | 497 | 0 | running | 88 | $36,720 |
| 26 | 17 | 21 | Elliott Sadler (R) | Wood Brothers Racing | Ford | 497 | 0 | running | 85 | $37,490 |
| 27 | 37 | 12 | Jeremy Mayfield | Penske-Kranefuss Racing | Ford | 496 | 0 | running | 82 | $41,570 |
| 28 | 25 | 60 | Geoff Bodine | Joe Bessey Racing | Chevrolet | 495 | 0 | running | 79 | $26,515 |
| 29 | 42 | 26 | Johnny Benson Jr. | Roush Racing | Ford | 495 | 0 | running | 76 | $36,485 |
| 30 | 15 | 25 | Wally Dallenbach Jr. | Hendrick Motorsports | Chevrolet | 494 | 0 | running | 73 | $35,660 |
| 31 | 29 | 91 | Dick Trickle | LJ Racing | Chevrolet | 493 | 0 | running | 70 | $25,615 |
| 32 | 12 | 66 | Darrell Waltrip | Haas-Carter Motorsports | Ford | 491 | 0 | running | 67 | $25,370 |
| 33 | 35 | 41 | David Green | Larry Hedrick Motorsports | Chevrolet | 490 | 0 | running | 64 | $25,350 |
| 34 | 22 | 71 | Dave Marcis | Marcis Auto Racing | Chevrolet | 490 | 0 | running | 61 | $25,810 |
| 35 | 28 | 16 | Kevin Lepage | Roush Racing | Ford | 489 | 0 | running | 58 | $32,290 |
| 36 | 27 | 42 | Joe Nemechek | Team SABCO | Chevrolet | 478 | 0 | running | 55 | $32,770 |
| 37 | 3 | 18 | Bobby Labonte | Joe Gibbs Racing | Pontiac | 471 | 0 | running | 52 | $41,960 |
| 38 | 5 | 10 | Ricky Rudd | Rudd Performance Motorsports | Ford | 410 | 0 | handling | 49 | $32,250 |
| 39 | 36 | 00 | Buckshot Jones (R) | Buckshot Racing | Pontiac | 406 | 0 | running | 46 | $25,240 |
| 40 | 11 | 77 | Robert Pressley | Jasper Motorsports | Ford | 403 | 0 | running | 43 | $25,425 |
| 41 | 9 | 58 | Ricky Craven | SBIII Motorsports | Ford | 401 | 0 | running | 40 | $25,200 |
| 42 | 19 | 9 | Jerry Nadeau | Melling Racing | Ford | 335 | 0 | crash | 37 | $25,675 |
| 43 | 41 | 36 | Ernie Irvan | MB2 Motorsports | Pontiac | 144 | 0 | handling | 34 | $32,161 |
Failed to qualify
| 44 | | 45 | Rich Bickle | Tyler Jet Motorsports | Pontiac | | | | | |
| 45 | | 90 | Stanton Barrett | Donlavey Racing | Ford | | | | | |
| 46 | | 30 | Derrike Cope | Bahari Racing | Pontiac | | | | | |
Official race results

| Previous race: 1999 Primestar 500 | NASCAR Winston Cup Series; 1999 season | Next race: 1999 Goody's Body Pain 500 |
