= 1999 Primestar 500 =

Sixth race of the 1999 NASCAR Winston Cup Series

Race details
- Race 6 of 34 in the 1999 NASCAR Winston Cup Series
- The 1999 Primestar 500 program cover, with artwork by NASCAR artist Sam Bass.
- Date: March 28, 1999
- Official name: Third Annual Primestar 500
- Location: Fort Worth, Texas, Texas Motor Speedway
- Course: Permanent racing facility
- Course length: 1.5 miles (2.41 km)
- Distance: 334 laps, 501 mi (806.281 km)
- Average speed: 144.276 miles per hour (232.190 km/h)

Pole position
Driver	Kenny Irwin Jr.	Robert Yates Racing
- Time: 28.398

Most laps led
Driver	Terry Labonte	Hendrick Motorsports
- Laps: 124

Winner
No. 5	Terry Labonte	Hendrick Motorsports

Television in the United States
- Network: CBS
- Announcers: Mike Joy, Ned Jarrett, Buddy Baker

Radio in the United States
- Radio: Performance Racing Network

The 1999 Primestar 500 was the sixth stock car race of the 1999 NASCAR Winston Cup Series season and the third iteration of the event. The race was held on Sunday, March 28, 1999, in Fort Worth, Texas at Texas Motor Speedway, a 1.5 miles (2.4 km) permanent tri-oval shaped racetrack. The race took the scheduled 334 laps to complete. Nearing the end of the race, Hendrick Motorsports driver Terry Labonte would make a late-race move to pass Robert Yates Racing driver Dale Jarrett for the lead. With three to go, the caution came out for Jimmy Spencer, handing the win to Labonte. The win was Labonte's 21st career NASCAR Winston Cup Series victory and his only victory of the season. To fill out the podium, Jarrett and Joe Gibbs Racing driver Bobby Labonte would finish second and third, respectively.

== Background ==
The layout of Texas Motor Speedway, the venue where the race was held.

Texas Motor Speedway is a speedway located in the northernmost portion of Fort Worth, Texas. The track measures 1.5 mi (2.4 km) around and is banked 24 degrees in the turns. It is of the oval design, where the front straightaway juts outward slightly. The track is owned by Speedway Motorsports.

=== Entry list ===
- (R) denotes rookie driver.

#	Driver	Team	Make
00	Buckshot Jones (R)	Buckshot Racing	Pontiac
1	Steve Park	Dale Earnhardt, Inc.	Chevrolet
2	Rusty Wallace	Penske-Kranefuss Racing	Ford
3	Dale Earnhardt	Richard Childress Racing	Chevrolet
4	Bobby Hamilton	Morgan–McClure Motorsports	Chevrolet
5	Terry Labonte	Hendrick Motorsports	Chevrolet
6	Mark Martin	Roush Racing	Ford
7	Michael Waltrip	Mattei Motorsports	Chevrolet
9	Jerry Nadeau	Melling Racing	Ford
10	Ricky Rudd	Rudd Performance Motorsports	Ford
11	Brett Bodine	Brett Bodine Racing	Ford
12	Jeremy Mayfield	Penske-Kranefuss Racing	Ford
14	Randy LaJoie	No Fear Racing	Ford
16	Kevin Lepage	Roush Racing	Ford
18	Bobby Labonte	Joe Gibbs Racing	Pontiac
20	Tony Stewart (R)	Joe Gibbs Racing	Pontiac
21	Elliott Sadler (R)	Wood Brothers Racing	Ford
22	Ward Burton	Bill Davis Racing	Pontiac
23	Jimmy Spencer	Haas-Carter Motorsports	Ford
24	Jeff Gordon	Hendrick Motorsports	Chevrolet
25	Wally Dallenbach Jr.	Hendrick Motorsports	Chevrolet
26	Johnny Benson Jr.	Roush Racing	Ford
28	Kenny Irwin Jr.	Robert Yates Racing	Ford
30	Derrike Cope	Bahari Racing	Pontiac
31	Mike Skinner	Richard Childress Racing	Chevrolet
33	Ken Schrader	Andy Petree Racing	Chevrolet
36	Ernie Irvan	MB2 Motorsports	Pontiac
40	Sterling Marlin	Team SABCO	Chevrolet
41	David Green	Larry Hedrick Motorsports	Chevrolet
42	Joe Nemechek	Team SABCO	Chevrolet
43	John Andretti	Petty Enterprises	Pontiac
44	Kyle Petty	Petty Enterprises	Pontiac
45	Rich Bickle	Tyler Jet Motorsports	Pontiac
55	Kenny Wallace	Andy Petree Racing	Chevrolet
58	Ricky Craven	SBIII Motorsports	Ford
60	Geoff Bodine	Joe Bessey Racing	Chevrolet
66	Darrell Waltrip	Haas-Carter Motorsports	Ford
71	Dave Marcis	Marcis Auto Racing	Chevrolet
75	Ted Musgrave	Butch Mock Motorsports	Ford
77	Robert Pressley	Jasper Motorsports	Ford
88	Dale Jarrett	Robert Yates Racing	Ford
90	Stanton Barrett	Donlavey Racing	Ford
91	Dick Trickle	LJ Racing	Chevrolet
94	Bill Elliott	Bill Elliott Racing	Ford
97	Chad Little	Roush Racing	Ford
98	Rick Mast	Burdette Motorsports	Ford
99	Jeff Burton	Roush Racing	Ford
Official entry list

== Practice ==
Originally, four practice sessions were scheduled to be held, with two on Friday and two on Saturday. However, due to rain, the second practice session on Saturday was cancelled.

=== First practice ===
The first practice session was held on Friday, March 26, at 11:00 AM CST. The session would last for one hour and 15 minutes. Mark Martin, driving for Roush Racing, would set the fastest time in the session, with a lap of 28.402 and an average speed of 190.127 mph (305.980 km/h).

Pos.	#	Driver	Team	Make	Time	Speed
1	6	Mark Martin	Roush Racing	Ford	28.402	190.127
2	60	Geoff Bodine	Joe Bessey Racing	Chevrolet	28.418	190.020
3	21	Elliott Sadler	Wood Brothers Racing	Ford	28.637	188.567
Full first practice results

=== Second practice ===
The second practice session was held on Friday, March 26, at 1:05 PM CST. The session would last for one hour and 20 minutes. Geoff Bodine, driving for Joe Bessey Racing, would set the fastest time in the session, with a lap of 28.402 and an average speed of 190.127 mph (305.980 km/h).

Pos.	#	Driver	Team	Make	Time	Speed
1	60	Geoff Bodine	Joe Bessey Racing	Chevrolet	28.406	190.101
2	1	Steve Park	Dale Earnhardt, Inc.	Chevrolet	28.486	189.567
3	94	Bill Elliott	Bill Elliott Racing	Ford	28.523	189.321
Full second practice results

=== Final practice ===
The final practice session, sometimes referred to as Happy Hour, was held on Saturday, March 27, at 9:00 AM CST. The session would last for one hour. Geoff Bodine, driving for Joe Bessey Racing, would set the fastest time in the session, with a lap of 28.347 and an average speed of 190.496 mph (306.574 km/h).

Pos.	#	Driver	Team	Make	Time	Speed
1	60	Geoff Bodine	Joe Bessey Racing	Chevrolet	28.347	190.496
2	42	Joe Nemechek	Team SABCO	Chevrolet	28.686	188.245
3	91	Dick Trickle	LJ Racing	Chevrolet	28.805	187.467
Full final practice results

== Qualifying ==
Qualifying was split into two rounds. The first round was held on Friday, March 26, at 3:30 PM CST. Each driver would have one lap to set a time. During the first round, the top 25 drivers in the round would be guaranteed a starting spot in the race. If a driver was not able to guarantee a spot in the first round, they had the option to scrub their time from the first round and try and run a faster lap time in a second round qualifying run, held on Saturday, March 27, at 10:45 AM CST. As with the first round, each driver would have one lap to set a time. Positions 26-36 would be decided on time, while positions 37-43 would be based on provisionals. Six spots are awarded by the use of provisionals based on owner's points. The seventh is awarded to a past champion who has not otherwise qualified for the race. If no past champion needs the provisional, the next team in the owner points will be awarded a provisional.

Kenny Irwin Jr., driving for Robert Yates Racing, would win the pole, setting a time of 28.398 and an average speed of 190.154 miles per hour (306.023 km/h).

Four drivers would fail to qualify: Dick Trickle, Kyle Petty, Dave Marcis, and Stanton Barrett.

=== Full qualifying results ===
Pos.	#	Driver	Team	Make	Time	Speed
1	28	Kenny Irwin Jr.	Robert Yates Racing	Ford	28.398	190.154
2	18	Bobby Labonte	Joe Gibbs Racing	Pontiac	28.443	189.853
3	1	Steve Park	Dale Earnhardt, Inc.	Chevrolet	28.520	189.341
4	5	Terry Labonte	Hendrick Motorsports	Chevrolet	28.553	189.122
5	22	Ward Burton	Bill Davis Racing	Pontiac	28.573	188.990
6	6	Mark Martin	Roush Racing	Ford	28.578	188.957
7	33	Ken Schrader	Andy Petree Racing	Chevrolet	28.605	188.778
8	24	Jeff Gordon	Hendrick Motorsports	Chevrolet	28.617	188.699
9	94	Bill Elliott	Bill Elliott Racing	Ford	28.634	188.587
10	25	Wally Dallenbach Jr.	Hendrick Motorsports	Chevrolet	28.649	188.488
11	2	Rusty Wallace	Penske-Kranefuss Racing	Ford	28.654	188.455
12	88	Dale Jarrett	Robert Yates Racing	Ford	28.663	188.396
13	21	Elliott Sadler (R)	Wood Brothers Racing	Ford	28.686	188.245
14	14	Randy LaJoie	No Fear Racing	Ford	28.697	188.173
15	43	John Andretti	Petty Enterprises	Pontiac	28.731	187.950
16	77	Robert Pressley	Jasper Motorsports	Ford	28.778	187.643
17	11	Brett Bodine	Brett Bodine Racing	Ford	28.784	187.604
18	98	Rick Mast	Burdette Motorsports	Ford	28.797	187.520
19	20	Tony Stewart (R)	Joe Gibbs Racing	Pontiac	28.802	187.487
20	99	Jeff Burton	Roush Racing	Ford	28.829	187.311
21	9	Jerry Nadeau	Melling Racing	Ford	28.855	187.143
22	36	Ernie Irvan	MB2 Motorsports	Pontiac	28.857	187.130
23	31	Mike Skinner	Richard Childress Racing	Chevrolet	28.886	186.942
24	26	Johnny Benson Jr.	Roush Racing	Ford	28.904	186.825
25	75	Ted Musgrave	Butch Mock Motorsports	Ford	28.908	186.800
26	60	Geoff Bodine	Joe Bessey Racing	Chevrolet	28.504	189.447
27	12	Jeremy Mayfield	Penske-Kranefuss Racing	Ford	28.741	187.885
28	42	Joe Nemechek	Team SABCO	Chevrolet	28.741	187.885
29	7	Michael Waltrip	Mattei Motorsports	Chevrolet	28.831	187.298
30	45	Rich Bickle	Tyler Jet Motorsports	Pontiac	28.922	186.709
31	00	Buckshot Jones (R)	Buckshot Racing	Pontiac	28.923	186.703
32	66	Darrell Waltrip	Haas-Carter Motorsports	Ford	28.946	186.554
33	4	Bobby Hamilton	Morgan–McClure Motorsports	Chevrolet	28.957	186.483
34	10	Ricky Rudd	Rudd Performance Motorsports	Ford	28.963	186.445
35	58	Ricky Craven	SBIII Motorsports	Ford	29.000	186.207
36	30	Derrike Cope	Bahari Racing	Pontiac	29.033	185.995
Provisionals
37	97	Chad Little	Roush Racing	Ford	-*	-*
38	3	Dale Earnhardt	Richard Childress Racing	Chevrolet	-*	-*
39	40	Sterling Marlin	Team SABCO	Chevrolet	-*	-*
40	16	Kevin Lepage	Roush Racing	Ford	-*	-*
41	23	Jimmy Spencer	Haas-Carter Motorsports	Ford	-*	-*
42	55	Kenny Wallace	Andy Petree Racing	Chevrolet	-*	-*
43	41	David Green	Larry Hedrick Motorsports	Chevrolet	-*	-*
Failed to qualify
44	91	Dick Trickle	LJ Racing	Chevrolet	29.065	185.790
45	44	Kyle Petty	Petty Enterprises	Pontiac	29.180	185.058
46	71	Dave Marcis	Marcis Auto Racing	Chevrolet	29.331	184.106
47	90	Stanton Barrett	Donlavey Racing	Ford	29.099	185.573
Official qualifying results

*Time not available.

== Race results ==
Fin	St	#	Driver	Team	Make	Laps	Led	Status	Pts	Winnings
1	4	5	Terry Labonte	Hendrick Motorsports	Chevrolet	334	124	running	185	$376,840
2	12	88	Dale Jarrett	Robert Yates Racing	Ford	334	39	running	175	$250,100
3	2	18	Bobby Labonte	Joe Gibbs Racing	Pontiac	334	10	running	170	$181,650
4	11	2	Rusty Wallace	Penske-Kranefuss Racing	Ford	334	0	running	160	$151,675
5	27	12	Jeremy Mayfield	Penske-Kranefuss Racing	Ford	334	2	running	160	$119,925
6	19	20	Tony Stewart (R)	Joe Gibbs Racing	Pontiac	334	0	running	150	$107,315
7	20	99	Jeff Burton	Roush Racing	Ford	334	0	running	146	$107,675
8	38	3	Dale Earnhardt	Richard Childress Racing	Chevrolet	334	0	running	142	$97,775
9	39	40	Sterling Marlin	Team SABCO	Chevrolet	334	0	running	138	$95,150
10	13	21	Elliott Sadler (R)	Wood Brothers Racing	Ford	334	2	running	139	$96,490
11	24	26	Johnny Benson Jr.	Roush Racing	Ford	334	0	running	130	$91,150
12	30	45	Rich Bickle	Tyler Jet Motorsports	Pontiac	333	0	running	127	$76,300
13	37	97	Chad Little	Roush Racing	Ford	333	0	running	124	$85,100
14	29	7	Michael Waltrip	Mattei Motorsports	Chevrolet	333	0	running	121	$83,400
15	1	28	Kenny Irwin Jr.	Robert Yates Racing	Ford	333	32	running	123	$94,640
16	5	22	Ward Burton	Bill Davis Racing	Pontiac	333	56	running	120	$90,800
17	7	33	Ken Schrader	Andy Petree Racing	Chevrolet	333	4	running	117	$75,900
18	17	11	Brett Bodine	Brett Bodine Racing	Ford	333	1	running	114	$74,900
19	34	10	Ricky Rudd	Rudd Performance Motorsports	Ford	333	0	running	106	$73,400
20	16	77	Robert Pressley	Jasper Motorsports	Ford	333	0	running	103	$68,065
21	9	94	Bill Elliott	Bill Elliott Racing	Ford	333	0	running	100	$66,575
22	36	30	Derrike Cope	Bahari Racing	Pontiac	331	0	running	97	$58,075
23	10	25	Wally Dallenbach Jr.	Hendrick Motorsports	Chevrolet	331	0	running	94	$63,975
24	21	9	Jerry Nadeau	Melling Racing	Ford	331	0	running	91	$56,475
25	32	66	Darrell Waltrip	Haas-Carter Motorsports	Ford	330	0	running	88	$51,775
26	43	41	David Green	Larry Hedrick Motorsports	Chevrolet	330	0	running	85	$54,075
27	35	58	Ricky Craven	SBIII Motorsports	Ford	330	1	running	87	$49,775
28	41	23	Jimmy Spencer	Haas-Carter Motorsports	Ford	329	0	crash	79	$58,775
29	33	4	Bobby Hamilton	Morgan–McClure Motorsports	Chevrolet	324	0	running	76	$62,775
30	18	98	Rick Mast	Burdette Motorsports	Ford	307	0	running	73	$49,500
31	25	75	Ted Musgrave	Butch Mock Motorsports	Ford	306	0	running	70	$45,275
32	3	1	Steve Park	Dale Earnhardt, Inc.	Chevrolet	289	0	running	67	$50,975
33	28	42	Joe Nemechek	Team SABCO	Chevrolet	272	0	running	64	$49,975
34	6	6	Mark Martin	Roush Racing	Ford	253	63	running	66	$58,975
35	31	00	Buckshot Jones (R)	Buckshot Racing	Pontiac	252	0	vibration	58	$40,975
36	26	60	Geoff Bodine	Joe Bessey Racing	Chevrolet	244	0	running	55	$41,450
37	22	36	Ernie Irvan	MB2 Motorsports	Pontiac	241	0	engine	52	$45,950
38	15	43	John Andretti	Petty Enterprises	Pontiac	202	0	handling	49	$44,950
39	42	55	Kenny Wallace	Andy Petree Racing	Chevrolet	174	0	overheating	46	$38,450
40	14	14	Randy LaJoie	No Fear Racing	Ford	152	0	engine	43	$37,950
41	40	16	Kevin Lepage	Roush Racing	Ford	132	0	crash	40	$44,850
42	23	31	Mike Skinner	Richard Childress Racing	Chevrolet	123	0	crash	37	$45,000
43	8	24	Jeff Gordon	Hendrick Motorsports	Chevrolet	68	0	crash	34	$60,000
Failed to qualify
44		91	Dick Trickle	LJ Racing	Chevrolet					
45		44	Kyle Petty	Petty Enterprises	Pontiac					
46		71	Dave Marcis	Marcis Auto Racing	Chevrolet					
47		90	Stanton Barrett	Donlavey Racing	Ford					
Official race results

== Media ==
=== Television ===
The DirecTV 500 was covered by CBS in the United States for the fourth straight year and it was their final DirecTV 500 race as coverage would switch to Fox in 2001. Mike Joy, two-time NASCAR Cup Series champion Ned Jarrett and nineteen time NASCAR Cup Series race winner Buddy Baker called the race from the broadcast booth. Dick Berggren, Ralph Sheheen and Bill Stephens handled pit road for the television side. Ken Squier would serve as host.

CBS
Host	Booth announcers		Pit reporters
Host	Lap-by-lap	Color-commentators	Pit reporters
Ken Squier	Mike Joy	Ned Jarrett; Buddy Baker	Dick Berggren; Ralph Sheheen; Bill Stephens

Previous race: 1999 TranSouth Financial 400	NASCAR Winston Cup Series; 1999 season	Next race: 1999 Food City 500
