= 1999 Goody's Body Pain 500 =

Eighth race of the 1999 NASCAR Winston Cup Series

Race details
- Race 8 of 34 in the 1999 NASCAR Winston Cup Series
- The 1999 Goody's Body Pain 500 program cover.
- Date: April 18, 1999
- Official name: 50th Annual Goody's Body Pain 500
- Location: Martinsville, Virginia, Martinsville Speedway
- Course: Permanent racing facility
- Course length: 0.526 miles (0.847 km)
- Distance: 500 laps, 263 mi (423.257 km)
- Average speed: 75.653 miles per hour (121.752 km/h)
- Attendance: 60,000

Pole position
Driver	Tony Stewart	Joe Gibbs Racing
- Time: 19.875

Most laps led
Driver	Rusty Wallace	Penske-Kranefuss Racing
- Laps: 177

Winner
No. 43	John Andretti	Petty Enterprises

Television in the United States
- Network: ESPN
- Announcers: Bob Jenkins, Ned Jarrett, Benny Parsons

Radio in the United States
- Radio: Motor Racing Network

The 1999 Goody's Body Pain 500 was the eighth stock car race of the 1999 NASCAR Winston Cup Series season and the 50th iteration of the event. The race was held on Sunday, April 18, 1999, before an audience of 60,000 in Martinsville, Virginia at Martinsville Speedway, a 0.526 miles (0.847 km) permanent oval-shaped short track. The race took the scheduled 500 laps to complete. With three laps to go in the race, Petty Enterprises driver John Andretti would make a late-race move for the lead on Roush Racing driver Jeff Burton to take his second and final career NASCAR Winston Cup Series victory and his only win of the season. To fill out the podium, Jeff Burton and Hendrick Motorsports driver Jeff Gordon would finish second and third, respectively.

== Background ==
The layout of Martinsville Speedway, the venue where the race was held.

Martinsville Speedway is a NASCAR-owned stock car racing track located in Henry County, in Ridgeway, Virginia, just to the south of Martinsville. At 0.526 miles (0.847 km) in length, it is the shortest track in the NASCAR Cup Series. The track was also one of the first paved oval tracks in NASCAR, being built in 1947 by H. Clay Earles. It is also the only remaining race track that has been on the NASCAR circuit from its beginning in 1948.

=== Entry list ===
- (R) denotes rookie driver.

#	Driver	Team	Make
00	Buckshot Jones (R)	Buckshot Racing	Pontiac
1	Steve Park	Dale Earnhardt, Inc.	Chevrolet
2	Rusty Wallace	Penske-Kranefuss Racing	Ford
3	Dale Earnhardt	Richard Childress Racing	Chevrolet
4	Bobby Hamilton	Morgan–McClure Motorsports	Chevrolet
5	Terry Labonte	Hendrick Motorsports	Chevrolet
6	Mark Martin	Roush Racing	Ford
7	Michael Waltrip	Mattei Motorsports	Chevrolet
9	Jerry Nadeau	Melling Racing	Ford
10	Ricky Rudd	Rudd Performance Motorsports	Ford
11	Brett Bodine	Brett Bodine Racing	Ford
12	Jeremy Mayfield	Penske-Kranefuss Racing	Ford
16	Kevin Lepage	Roush Racing	Ford
18	Bobby Labonte	Joe Gibbs Racing	Pontiac
20	Tony Stewart (R)	Joe Gibbs Racing	Pontiac
21	Elliott Sadler (R)	Wood Brothers Racing	Ford
22	Ward Burton	Bill Davis Racing	Pontiac
23	Jimmy Spencer	Haas-Carter Motorsports	Ford
24	Jeff Gordon	Hendrick Motorsports	Chevrolet
25	Wally Dallenbach Jr.	Hendrick Motorsports	Chevrolet
26	Johnny Benson Jr.	Roush Racing	Ford
28	Kenny Irwin Jr.	Robert Yates Racing	Ford
30	Derrike Cope	Bahari Racing	Pontiac
31	Mike Skinner	Richard Childress Racing	Chevrolet
33	Ken Schrader	Andy Petree Racing	Chevrolet
36	Ernie Irvan	MB2 Motorsports	Pontiac
40	Sterling Marlin	Team SABCO	Chevrolet
41	David Green	Larry Hedrick Motorsports	Chevrolet
42	Joe Nemechek	Team SABCO	Chevrolet
43	John Andretti	Petty Enterprises	Pontiac
44	Kyle Petty	Petty Enterprises	Pontiac
45	Rich Bickle	Tyler Jet Motorsports	Pontiac
55	Kenny Wallace	Andy Petree Racing	Chevrolet
58	Ricky Craven	SBIII Motorsports	Ford
60	Geoff Bodine	Joe Bessey Racing	Chevrolet
66	Darrell Waltrip	Haas-Carter Motorsports	Ford
71	Dave Marcis	Marcis Auto Racing	Chevrolet
75	Ted Musgrave	Butch Mock Motorsports	Ford
77	Robert Pressley	Jasper Motorsports	Ford
88	Dale Jarrett	Robert Yates Racing	Ford
90	Morgan Shepherd	Donlavey Racing	Ford
91	Dick Trickle	LJ Racing	Chevrolet
94	Bill Elliott	Bill Elliott Racing	Ford
97	Chad Little	Roush Racing	Ford
98	Rick Mast	Burdette Motorsports	Ford
99	Jeff Burton	Roush Racing	Ford
Official entry list

== Practice ==
=== First practice ===
The first practice session was held on Friday, April 16, at 11:00 AM EST. The session would last for two hours and 30 minutes. Jeff Gordon, driving for Hendrick Motorsports, would set the fastest time in the session, with a lap of 19.917 and an average speed of 95.074 mph (153.007 km/h).

Pos.	#	Driver	Team	Make	Time	Speed
1	24	Jeff Gordon	Hendrick Motorsports	Chevrolet	19.917	95.074
2	2	Rusty Wallace	Penske-Kranefuss Racing	Ford	19.935	94.988
3	33	Ken Schrader	Andy Petree Racing	Chevrolet	19.939	94.969
Full first practice results

=== Second practice ===
The second practice session was held on Saturday, April 17, at 10:00 AM EST. The session would last for one hour and 45 minutes. Dick Trickle, driving for LJ Racing, would set the fastest time in the session, with a lap of 20.180 and an average speed of 93.835 mph (151.013 km/h).

Pos.	#	Driver	Team	Make	Time	Speed
1	91	Dick Trickle	LJ Racing	Chevrolet	20.180	93.835
2	6	Mark Martin	Roush Racing	Ford	20.215	93.673
3	44	Kyle Petty	Petty Enterprises	Pontiac	20.224	93.631
Full second practice results

=== Final practice ===
The final practice session, sometimes referred to as Happy Hour, was held on Saturday, April 17, after the preliminary 1999 NAPA 250. The session would last for one hour. Mark Martin, driving for Roush Racing, would set the fastest time in the session, with a lap of 20.260 and an average speed of 93.464 mph (150.416 km/h).

Pos.	#	Driver	Team	Make	Time	Speed
1	6	Mark Martin	Roush Racing	Ford	20.260	93.464
2	24	Jeff Gordon	Hendrick Motorsports	Chevrolet	20.280	93.372
3	75	Ted Musgrave	Butch Mock Motorsports	Ford	20.331	93.138
Full Happy Hour practice results

== Qualifying ==
Qualifying was split into two rounds. The first round was held on Friday, April 16, at 3:00 PM EST. Each driver would have two laps to set a fastest time; the fastest of the two would count as their official qualifying lap. During the first round, the top 25 drivers in the round would be guaranteed a starting spot in the race. If a driver was not able to guarantee a spot in the first round, they had the option to scrub their time from the first round and try and run a faster lap time in a second round qualifying run, held on Saturday, April 17, at 12:30 PM EST. As with the first round, each driver would have two laps to set a fastest time; the fastest of the two would count as their official qualifying lap. Positions 26-36 would be decided on time, while positions 37-43 would be based on provisionals. Six spots are awarded by the use of provisionals based on owner's points. The seventh is awarded to a past champion who has not otherwise qualified for the race. If no past champion needs the provisional, the next team in the owner points will be awarded a provisional.

Tony Stewart, driving for Joe Gibbs Racing, would win the pole, setting a time of 19.875 and an average speed of 95.275 miles per hour (153.330 km/h).

Three drivers would fail to qualify: Morgan Shepherd, Dave Marcis, and Buckshot Jones.

=== Full qualifying results ===
Pos.	#	Driver	Team	Make	Time	Speed
1	20	Tony Stewart (R)	Joe Gibbs Racing	Pontiac	19.875	95.275
2	6	Mark Martin	Roush Racing	Ford	19.900	95.156
3	99	Jeff Burton	Roush Racing	Ford	19.908	95.118
4	9	Jerry Nadeau	Melling Racing	Ford	19.909	95.113
5	2	Rusty Wallace	Penske-Kranefuss Racing	Ford	19.916	95.079
6	33	Ken Schrader	Andy Petree Racing	Chevrolet	19.949	94.922
7	36	Ernie Irvan	MB2 Motorsports	Pontiac	19.955	94.894
8	18	Bobby Labonte	Joe Gibbs Racing	Pontiac	19.964	94.851
9	24	Jeff Gordon	Hendrick Motorsports	Chevrolet	19.965	94.846
10	44	Kyle Petty	Petty Enterprises	Pontiac	19.982	94.765
11	45	Rich Bickle	Tyler Jet Motorsports	Pontiac	19.985	94.751
12	98	Rick Mast	Burdette Motorsports	Ford	20.005	94.656
13	23	Jimmy Spencer	Haas-Carter Motorsports	Ford	20.009	94.637
14	11	Brett Bodine	Brett Bodine Racing	Ford	20.022	94.576
15	10	Ricky Rudd	Rudd Performance Motorsports	Ford	20.032	94.529
16	77	Robert Pressley	Jasper Motorsports	Ford	20.046	94.463
17	40	Sterling Marlin	Team SABCO	Chevrolet	20.048	94.453
18	22	Ward Burton	Bill Davis Racing	Pontiac	20.064	94.378
19	75	Ted Musgrave	Butch Mock Motorsports	Ford	20.065	94.373
20	66	Darrell Waltrip	Haas-Carter Motorsports	Ford	20.079	94.307
21	43	John Andretti	Petty Enterprises	Pontiac	20.089	94.261
22	31	Mike Skinner	Richard Childress Racing	Chevrolet	20.099	94.214
23	1	Steve Park	Dale Earnhardt, Inc.	Chevrolet	20.100	94.209
24	4	Bobby Hamilton	Morgan–McClure Motorsports	Chevrolet	20.105	94.186
25	94	Bill Elliott	Bill Elliott Racing	Ford	20.120	94.115
26	25	Wally Dallenbach Jr.	Hendrick Motorsports	Chevrolet	20.124	94.097
27	28	Kenny Irwin Jr.	Robert Yates Racing	Ford	20.137	94.036
28	16	Kevin Lepage	Roush Racing	Ford	20.142	94.013
29	7	Michael Waltrip	Mattei Motorsports	Chevrolet	20.144	94.003
30	60	Geoff Bodine	Joe Bessey Racing	Chevrolet	20.150	93.975
31	88	Dale Jarrett	Robert Yates Racing	Ford	20.152	93.966
32	12	Jeremy Mayfield	Penske-Kranefuss Racing	Ford	20.156	93.947
33	91	Dick Trickle	LJ Racing	Chevrolet	20.176	93.854
34	55	Kenny Wallace	Andy Petree Racing	Chevrolet	20.189	93.794
35	42	Joe Nemechek	Team SABCO	Chevrolet	20.192	93.780
36	21	Elliott Sadler (R)	Wood Brothers Racing	Ford	20.198	93.752
Provisionals
37	5	Terry Labonte	Hendrick Motorsports	Chevrolet	20.403	92.810
38	97	Chad Little	Roush Racing	Ford	20.470	92.506
39	3	Dale Earnhardt	Richard Childress Racing	Chevrolet	20.245	93.534
40	26	Johnny Benson Jr.	Roush Racing	Ford	20.379	92.919
41	41	David Green	Larry Hedrick Motorsports	Chevrolet	20.534	92.218
42	58	Ricky Craven	SBIII Motorsports	Ford	20.538	92.200
43	30	Derrike Cope	Bahari Racing	Pontiac	20.614	91.860
Failed to qualify
44	90	Morgan Shepherd	Donlavey Racing	Ford	20.198	93.752
45	71	Dave Marcis	Marcis Auto Racing	Chevrolet	20.261	93.460
46	00	Buckshot Jones (R)	Buckshot Racing	Pontiac	20.708	91.443
Official qualifying results

== Race results ==
Fin	St	#	Driver	Team	Make	Laps	Led	Status	Pts	Winnings
1	21	43	John Andretti	Petty Enterprises	Pontiac	500	4	running	180	$113,275
2	3	99	Jeff Burton	Roush Racing	Ford	500	130	running	175	$89,865
3	9	24	Jeff Gordon	Hendrick Motorsports	Chevrolet	500	163	running	170	$71,800
4	22	31	Mike Skinner	Richard Childress Racing	Chevrolet	500	0	running	160	$57,355
5	2	6	Mark Martin	Roush Racing	Ford	500	17	running	160	$52,925
6	34	55	Kenny Wallace	Andy Petree Racing	Chevrolet	500	0	running	150	$41,315
7	5	2	Rusty Wallace	Penske-Kranefuss Racing	Ford	500	177	running	156	$57,075
8	31	88	Dale Jarrett	Robert Yates Racing	Ford	500	0	running	142	$46,825
9	6	33	Ken Schrader	Andy Petree Racing	Chevrolet	500	0	running	138	$40,650
10	10	44	Kyle Petty	Petty Enterprises	Pontiac	500	4	running	139	$38,800
11	11	45	Rich Bickle	Tyler Jet Motorsports	Pontiac	500	0	running	130	$28,925
12	20	66	Darrell Waltrip	Haas-Carter Motorsports	Ford	500	0	running	127	$26,000
13	17	40	Sterling Marlin	Team SABCO	Chevrolet	499	0	running	124	$37,475
14	14	11	Brett Bodine	Brett Bodine Racing	Ford	499	2	running	126	$37,275
15	37	5	Terry Labonte	Hendrick Motorsports	Chevrolet	499	0	running	118	$42,215
16	13	23	Jimmy Spencer	Haas-Carter Motorsports	Ford	499	0	running	115	$37,075
17	38	97	Chad Little	Roush Racing	Ford	499	0	running	112	$36,375
18	26	25	Wally Dallenbach Jr.	Hendrick Motorsports	Chevrolet	498	0	running	109	$35,150
19	39	3	Dale Earnhardt	Richard Childress Racing	Chevrolet	498	0	running	106	$39,150
20	1	20	Tony Stewart (R)	Joe Gibbs Racing	Pontiac	498	0	running	103	$33,615
21	28	16	Kevin Lepage	Roush Racing	Ford	498	0	running	100	$34,750
22	7	36	Ernie Irvan	MB2 Motorsports	Pontiac	498	0	running	97	$34,150
23	16	77	Robert Pressley	Jasper Motorsports	Ford	498	0	running	94	$26,850
24	8	18	Bobby Labonte	Joe Gibbs Racing	Pontiac	498	2	running	96	$39,550
25	23	1	Steve Park	Dale Earnhardt, Inc.	Chevrolet	498	0	running	88	$33,650
26	41	41	David Green	Larry Hedrick Motorsports	Chevrolet	497	0	running	85	$26,000
27	18	22	Ward Burton	Bill Davis Racing	Pontiac	497	0	running	82	$32,700
28	36	21	Elliott Sadler (R)	Wood Brothers Racing	Ford	497	0	running	79	$33,000
29	15	10	Ricky Rudd	Rudd Performance Motorsports	Ford	497	0	running	76	$32,100
30	25	94	Bill Elliott	Bill Elliott Racing	Ford	495	0	running	73	$32,125
31	33	91	Dick Trickle	LJ Racing	Chevrolet	495	0	running	70	$24,700
32	4	9	Jerry Nadeau	Melling Racing	Ford	494	0	running	67	$22,500
33	24	4	Bobby Hamilton	Morgan–McClure Motorsports	Chevrolet	494	0	running	64	$36,300
34	43	30	Derrike Cope	Bahari Racing	Pontiac	492	0	running	61	$21,100
35	40	26	Johnny Benson Jr.	Roush Racing	Ford	492	0	running	58	$27,975
36	27	28	Kenny Irwin Jr.	Robert Yates Racing	Ford	490	0	running	55	$27,900
37	35	42	Joe Nemechek	Team SABCO	Chevrolet	487	0	running	52	$27,775
38	30	60	Geoff Bodine	Joe Bessey Racing	Chevrolet	486	0	running	49	$20,650
39	29	7	Michael Waltrip	Mattei Motorsports	Chevrolet	480	0	running	46	$27,525
40	19	75	Ted Musgrave	Butch Mock Motorsports	Ford	480	0	running	43	$20,400
41	32	12	Jeremy Mayfield	Penske-Kranefuss Racing	Ford	467	0	running	40	$35,275
42	12	98	Rick Mast	Burdette Motorsports	Ford	438	0	running	37	$23,950
43	42	58	Ricky Craven	SBIII Motorsports	Ford	401	1	handling	39	$20,025
Failed to qualify
44		90	Morgan Shepherd	Donlavey Racing	Ford					
45		71	Dave Marcis	Marcis Auto Racing	Chevrolet					
46		00	Buckshot Jones (R)	Buckshot Racing	Pontiac					
Official race results

Previous race: 1999 Food City 500	NASCAR Winston Cup Series; 1999 season	Next race: 1999 DieHard 500
