= 1999 DieHard 500 =

Ninth race of the 1999 NASCAR Winston Cup Series

Race details
- Race 9 of 34 in the 1999 NASCAR Winston Cup Series
- The 1999 DieHard 500 program cover.
- Date: April 25, 1999
- Official name: 30th Annual DieHard 500
- Location: Lincoln, Alabama, Talladega Superspeedway
- Course: Permanent racing facility
- Course length: 2.66 miles (4.28 km)
- Distance: 188 laps, 500.08 mi (804.8 km)
- Average speed: 163.395 miles per hour (262.959 km/h)
- Attendance: 100,000

Pole position
| Driver | Ken Schrader | Andy Petree Racing |
- Time: 48.421

Most laps led
| Driver | Dale Earnhardt | Richard Childress Racing |
- Laps: 70

Winner
| No. 3 | Dale Earnhardt | Richard Childress Racing |

Television in the United States
- Network: ABC
- Announcers: Bob Jenkins, Benny Parsons

Radio in the United States
- Radio: Motor Racing Network

The 1999 DieHard 500 was the ninth stock car race of the 1999 NASCAR Winston Cup Series season and the 30th iteration of the event. The race was held on Sunday, April 25, 1999, before an audience of 100,000 in Lincoln, Alabama at Talladega Superspeedway, a 2.66 miles (4.28 km) permanent triangle-shaped superspeedway. The race took the scheduled 188 laps to complete. In the final laps of the race, Richard Childress Racing driver Dale Earnhardt would manage to hold off the field on the final restart with 15 to go to win his 72nd career NASCAR Winston Cup Series victory and his first of the season. To fill out the podium, Robert Yates Racing driver Dale Jarrett and Roush Racing driver Mark Martin would finish second and third, respectively.

== Background ==
The layout of Talladega Superspeedway, the venue where the race was held.

Talladega Superspeedway, originally known as Alabama International Motor Superspeedway (AIMS), is a motorsports complex located north of Talladega, Alabama. It is located on the former Anniston Air Force Base in the small city of Lincoln. The track is a tri-oval and was constructed in the 1960s by the International Speedway Corporation, a business controlled by the France family. Talladega is most known for its steep banking and the unique location of the start/finish line that's located just past the exit to pit road. The track currently hosts the NASCAR series such as the NASCAR Cup Series, Xfinity Series and the Camping World Truck Series. Talladega is the longest NASCAR oval with a length of 2.66-mile-long (4.28 km) tri-oval like the Daytona International Speedway, which also is a 2.5-mile-long (4 km) tri-oval.

=== Entry list ===
- (R) denotes rookie driver.

| # | Driver | Team | Make |
|---|---|---|---|
| 00 | Buckshot Jones (R) | Buckshot Racing | Pontiac |
| 1 | Steve Park | Dale Earnhardt, Inc. | Chevrolet |
| 2 | Rusty Wallace | Penske-Kranefuss Racing | Ford |
| 3 | Dale Earnhardt | Richard Childress Racing | Chevrolet |
| 4 | Bobby Hamilton | Morgan–McClure Motorsports | Chevrolet |
| 5 | Terry Labonte | Hendrick Motorsports | Chevrolet |
| 6 | Mark Martin | Roush Racing | Ford |
| 7 | Michael Waltrip | Mattei Motorsports | Chevrolet |
| 9 | Jerry Nadeau | Melling Racing | Ford |
| 10 | Ricky Rudd | Rudd Performance Motorsports | Ford |
| 11 | Brett Bodine | Brett Bodine Racing | Ford |
| 12 | Jeremy Mayfield | Penske-Kranefuss Racing | Ford |
| 16 | Kevin Lepage | Roush Racing | Ford |
| 18 | Bobby Labonte | Joe Gibbs Racing | Pontiac |
| 20 | Tony Stewart (R) | Joe Gibbs Racing | Pontiac |
| 21 | Elliott Sadler (R) | Wood Brothers Racing | Ford |
| 22 | Ward Burton | Bill Davis Racing | Pontiac |
| 23 | Jimmy Spencer | Haas-Carter Motorsports | Ford |
| 24 | Jeff Gordon | Hendrick Motorsports | Chevrolet |
| 25 | Wally Dallenbach Jr. | Hendrick Motorsports | Chevrolet |
| 26 | Johnny Benson Jr. | Roush Racing | Ford |
| 28 | Kenny Irwin Jr. | Robert Yates Racing | Ford |
| 30 | Derrike Cope | Bahari Racing | Pontiac |
| 31 | Mike Skinner | Richard Childress Racing | Chevrolet |
| 33 | Ken Schrader | Andy Petree Racing | Chevrolet |
| 36 | Ernie Irvan | MB2 Motorsports | Pontiac |
| 40 | Sterling Marlin | Team SABCO | Chevrolet |
| 41 | David Green | Larry Hedrick Motorsports | Chevrolet |
| 42 | Joe Nemechek | Team SABCO | Chevrolet |
| 43 | John Andretti | Petty Enterprises | Pontiac |
| 44 | Kyle Petty | Petty Enterprises | Pontiac |
| 45 | Rich Bickle | Tyler Jet Motorsports | Pontiac |
| 50 | Dan Pardus | Midwest Transit Racing | Chevrolet |
| 55 | Kenny Wallace | Andy Petree Racing | Chevrolet |
| 58 | Ricky Craven | SBIII Motorsports | Ford |
| 60 | Geoff Bodine | Joe Bessey Racing | Chevrolet |
| 66 | Darrell Waltrip | Haas-Carter Motorsports | Ford |
| 71 | Dave Marcis | Marcis Auto Racing | Chevrolet |
| 75 | Ted Musgrave | Butch Mock Motorsports | Ford |
| 77 | Robert Pressley | Jasper Motorsports | Ford |
| 84 | Ken Bouchard | PBH Motorsports | Chevrolet |
| 88 | Dale Jarrett | Robert Yates Racing | Ford |
| 90 | Loy Allen Jr. | Donlavey Racing | Ford |
| 91 | Dick Trickle | LJ Racing | Chevrolet |
| 94 | Bill Elliott | Bill Elliott Racing | Ford |
| 97 | Chad Little | Roush Racing | Ford |
| 98 | Rick Mast | Burdette Motorsports | Ford |
| 99 | Jeff Burton | Roush Racing | Ford |
Official entry list

== Practice ==
=== First practice ===
The first practice session was held on Friday, April 23, at 11:00 a.m. CST. The session would last for two hours and 55 minutes. Joe Nemechek, driving for Team SABCO, would set the fastest time in the session, with a lap of 48.664 and an average speed of 196.777 mph (316.682 km/h).

| Pos. | # | Driver | Team | Make | Time | Speed |
|---|---|---|---|---|---|---|
| 1 | 42 | Joe Nemechek | Team SABCO | Chevrolet | 48.664 | 196.777 |
| 2 | 2 | Rusty Wallace | Penske-Kranefuss Racing | Ford | 48.688 | 196.680 |
| 3 | 4 | Bobby Hamilton | Morgan–McClure Motorsports | Chevrolet | 48.772 | 196.342 |
Full first practice results

=== Final practice ===
The final practice session, sometimes referred to as Happy Hour, was held on Saturday, April 24, at 1:00 {M CST. The session would last for one hour. Steve Park, driving for Dale Earnhardt, Inc., would set the fastest time in the session, with a lap of 48.655 and an average speed of 196.814 mph (316.741 km/h).

| Pos. | # | Driver | Team | Make | Time | Speed |
|---|---|---|---|---|---|---|
| 1 | 1 | Steve Park | Dale Earnhardt, Inc. | Chevrolet | 48.655 | 196.814 |
| 2 | 11 | Brett Bodine | Brett Bodine Racing | Ford | 48.906 | 195.804 |
| 3 | 26 | Johnny Benson Jr. | Roush Racing | Ford | 48.997 | 195.440 |
Full Happy Hour practice results

== Qualifying ==
Qualifying was split into two rounds. The first round was held on Friday, April 23, at 3:00 p.m. CST. Each driver would have two laps to set a fastest time; the fastest of the two would count as their official qualifying lap. During the first round, the top 25 drivers in the round would be guaranteed a starting spot in the race. If a driver was not able to guarantee a spot in the first round, they had the option to scrub their time from the first round and try and run a faster lap time in a second round qualifying run, held on Saturday, April 24, at 10:45 a.m. CST. As with the first round, each driver would have two laps to set a fastest time; the fastest of the two would count as their official qualifying lap. Positions 26-36 would be decided on time, while positions 37-43 would be based on provisionals. Six spots are awarded by the use of provisionals based on owner's points. The seventh is awarded to a past champion who has not otherwise qualified for the race. If no past champion needs the provisional, the next team in the owner points will be awarded a provisional.

Ken Schrader, driving for Andy Petree Racing, would win the pole, setting a time of 48.421 and an average speed of 197.765 miles per hour (318.272 km/h).

Five drivers would fail to qualify: Derrike Cope, Ken Bouchard, Dan Pardus, Dick Trickle, and Loy Allen Jr.

=== Full qualifying results ===
| Pos. | # | Driver | Team | Make | Time | Speed |
|---|---|---|---|---|---|---|
| 1 | 33 | Ken Schrader | Andy Petree Racing | Chevrolet | 48.421 | 197.765 |
| 2 | 18 | Bobby Labonte | Joe Gibbs Racing | Pontiac | 48.489 | 197.488 |
| 3 | 99 | Jeff Burton | Roush Racing | Ford | 48.547 | 197.252 |
| 4 | 42 | Joe Nemechek | Team SABCO | Chevrolet | 48.563 | 197.187 |
| 5 | 2 | Rusty Wallace | Penske-Kranefuss Racing | Ford | 48.704 | 196.616 |
| 6 | 6 | Mark Martin | Roush Racing | Ford | 48.712 | 196.584 |
| 7 | 10 | Ricky Rudd | Rudd Performance Motorsports | Ford | 48.767 | 196.362 |
| 8 | 20 | Tony Stewart (R) | Joe Gibbs Racing | Pontiac | 48.771 | 196.346 |
| 9 | 97 | Chad Little | Roush Racing | Ford | 48.841 | 196.065 |
| 10 | 7 | Michael Waltrip | Mattei Motorsports | Chevrolet | 48.860 | 195.989 |
| 11 | 25 | Wally Dallenbach Jr. | Hendrick Motorsports | Chevrolet | 48.866 | 195.964 |
| 12 | 31 | Mike Skinner | Richard Childress Racing | Chevrolet | 48.873 | 195.936 |
| 13 | 24 | Jeff Gordon | Hendrick Motorsports | Chevrolet | 48.887 | 195.880 |
| 14 | 40 | Sterling Marlin | Team SABCO | Chevrolet | 48.940 | 195.668 |
| 15 | 55 | Kenny Wallace | Andy Petree Racing | Chevrolet | 48.966 | 195.564 |
| 16 | 16 | Kevin Lepage | Roush Racing | Ford | 48.986 | 195.484 |
| 17 | 3 | Dale Earnhardt | Richard Childress Racing | Chevrolet | 48.989 | 195.472 |
| 18 | 94 | Bill Elliott | Bill Elliott Racing | Ford | 49.012 | 195.381 |
| 19 | 36 | Ernie Irvan | MB2 Motorsports | Pontiac | 49.033 | 195.297 |
| 20 | 9 | Jerry Nadeau | Melling Racing | Ford | 49.034 | 195.293 |
| 21 | 98 | Rick Mast | Burdette Motorsports | Ford | 49.037 | 195.281 |
| 22 | 28 | Kenny Irwin Jr. | Robert Yates Racing | Ford | 49.041 | 195.265 |
| 23 | 88 | Dale Jarrett | Robert Yates Racing | Ford | 49.048 | 195.237 |
| 24 | 43 | John Andretti | Petty Enterprises | Pontiac | 49.059 | 195.194 |
| 25 | 22 | Ward Burton | Bill Davis Racing | Pontiac | 49.137 | 194.884 |
| 26 | 00 | Buckshot Jones (R) | Buckshot Racing | Pontiac | 49.021 | 195.345 |
| 27 | 5 | Terry Labonte | Hendrick Motorsports | Chevrolet | 49.150 | 194.832 |
| 28 | 26 | Johnny Benson Jr. | Roush Racing | Ford | 49.232 | 194.508 |
| 29 | 60 | Geoff Bodine | Joe Bessey Racing | Chevrolet | 49.256 | 194.413 |
| 30 | 1 | Steve Park | Dale Earnhardt, Inc. | Chevrolet | 49.273 | 194.346 |
| 31 | 12 | Jeremy Mayfield | Penske-Kranefuss Racing | Ford | 49.328 | 194.129 |
| 32 | 71 | Dave Marcis | Marcis Auto Racing | Chevrolet | 49.356 | 194.019 |
| 33 | 23 | Jimmy Spencer | Haas-Carter Motorsports | Ford | 49.386 | 193.901 |
| 34 | 41 | David Green | Larry Hedrick Motorsports | Chevrolet | 49.403 | 193.834 |
| 35 | 4 | Bobby Hamilton | Morgan–McClure Motorsports | Chevrolet | 49.440 | 193.689 |
| 36 | 77 | Robert Pressley | Jasper Motorsports | Ford | 49.495 | 193.474 |
Provisionals
| 37 | 11 | Brett Bodine | Brett Bodine Racing | Ford | -* | -* |
| 38 | 66 | Darrell Waltrip | Haas-Carter Motorsports | Ford | -* | -* |
| 39 | 75 | Ted Musgrave | Butch Mock Motorsports | Ford | -* | -* |
| 40 | 44 | Kyle Petty | Petty Enterprises | Pontiac | -* | -* |
| 41 | 21 | Elliott Sadler (R) | Wood Brothers Racing | Ford | -* | -* |
| 42 | 45 | Rich Bickle | Tyler Jet Motorsports | Pontiac | -* | -* |
| 43 | 58 | Ricky Craven | SBIII Motorsports | Ford | -* | -* |
Failed to qualify
| 44 | 30 | Derrike Cope | Bahari Racing | Pontiac | 49.497 | 193.466 |
| 45 | 84 | Ken Bouchard | PBH Motorsports | Chevrolet | 49.566 | 193.197 |
| 46 | 50 | Dan Pardus | Midwest Transit Racing | Chevrolet | 49.798 | 192.297 |
| 47 | 91 | Dick Trickle | LJ Racing | Chevrolet | 50.051 | 191.325 |
| 48 | 90 | Loy Allen Jr. | Donlavey Racing | Ford | 50.951 | 187.945 |
Official first round qualifying results
Official starting lineup

*Time not available.

== Race results ==
| Fin | St | # | Driver | Team | Make | Laps | Led | Status | Pts | Winnings |
|---|---|---|---|---|---|---|---|---|---|---|
| 1 | 17 | 3 | Dale Earnhardt | Richard Childress Racing | Chevrolet | 188 | 70 | running | 185 | $147,795 |
| 2 | 23 | 88 | Dale Jarrett | Robert Yates Racing | Ford | 188 | 21 | running | 175 | $104,955 |
| 3 | 6 | 6 | Mark Martin | Roush Racing | Ford | 188 | 1 | running | 170 | $91,230 |
| 4 | 2 | 18 | Bobby Labonte | Joe Gibbs Racing | Pontiac | 188 | 17 | running | 165 | $84,380 |
| 5 | 8 | 20 | Tony Stewart (R) | Joe Gibbs Racing | Pontiac | 188 | 10 | running | 160 | $59,855 |
| 6 | 1 | 33 | Ken Schrader | Andy Petree Racing | Chevrolet | 188 | 3 | running | 155 | $74,055 |
| 7 | 15 | 55 | Kenny Wallace | Andy Petree Racing | Chevrolet | 188 | 0 | running | 146 | $51,130 |
| 8 | 20 | 9 | Jerry Nadeau | Melling Racing | Ford | 188 | 0 | running | 142 | $49,805 |
| 9 | 24 | 43 | John Andretti | Petty Enterprises | Pontiac | 188 | 22 | running | 143 | $55,555 |
| 10 | 18 | 94 | Bill Elliott | Bill Elliott Racing | Ford | 188 | 1 | running | 139 | $54,195 |
| 11 | 3 | 99 | Jeff Burton | Roush Racing | Ford | 188 | 0 | running | 130 | $64,850 |
| 12 | 16 | 16 | Kevin Lepage | Roush Racing | Ford | 188 | 0 | running | 127 | $48,420 |
| 13 | 40 | 44 | Kyle Petty | Petty Enterprises | Pontiac | 188 | 0 | running | 124 | $43,140 |
| 14 | 42 | 45 | Rich Bickle | Tyler Jet Motorsports | Pontiac | 188 | 0 | running | 121 | $35,360 |
| 15 | 31 | 12 | Jeremy Mayfield | Penske-Kranefuss Racing | Ford | 188 | 4 | running | 123 | $50,230 |
| 16 | 33 | 23 | Jimmy Spencer | Haas-Carter Motorsports | Ford | 188 | 0 | running | 115 | $47,930 |
| 17 | 29 | 60 | Geoff Bodine | Joe Bessey Racing | Chevrolet | 188 | 0 | running | 112 | $33,675 |
| 18 | 10 | 7 | Michael Waltrip | Mattei Motorsports | Chevrolet | 188 | 25 | running | 114 | $45,435 |
| 19 | 7 | 10 | Ricky Rudd | Rudd Performance Motorsports | Ford | 188 | 0 | running | 106 | $44,045 |
| 20 | 11 | 25 | Wally Dallenbach Jr. | Hendrick Motorsports | Chevrolet | 188 | 5 | running | 108 | $46,075 |
| 21 | 26 | 00 | Buckshot Jones (R) | Buckshot Racing | Pontiac | 188 | 0 | running | 100 | $33,345 |
| 22 | 36 | 77 | Robert Pressley | Jasper Motorsports | Ford | 188 | 1 | running | 102 | $36,150 |
| 23 | 32 | 71 | Dave Marcis | Marcis Auto Racing | Chevrolet | 187 | 0 | running | 94 | $32,015 |
| 24 | 21 | 98 | Rick Mast | Burdette Motorsports | Ford | 187 | 0 | running | 91 | $35,410 |
| 25 | 14 | 40 | Sterling Marlin | Team SABCO | Chevrolet | 187 | 0 | running | 88 | $42,405 |
| 26 | 38 | 66 | Darrell Waltrip | Haas-Carter Motorsports | Ford | 187 | 2 | running | 90 | $31,400 |
| 27 | 43 | 58 | Ricky Craven | SBIII Motorsports | Ford | 187 | 0 | running | 82 | $31,245 |
| 28 | 39 | 75 | Ted Musgrave | Butch Mock Motorsports | Ford | 187 | 0 | running | 79 | $34,890 |
| 29 | 41 | 21 | Elliott Sadler (R) | Wood Brothers Racing | Ford | 186 | 0 | running | 76 | $41,735 |
| 30 | 28 | 26 | Johnny Benson Jr. | Roush Racing | Ford | 184 | 0 | running | 73 | $41,505 |
| 31 | 35 | 4 | Bobby Hamilton | Morgan–McClure Motorsports | Chevrolet | 176 | 0 | handling | 70 | $45,625 |
| 32 | 25 | 22 | Ward Burton | Bill Davis Racing | Pontiac | 175 | 0 | running | 67 | $40,570 |
| 33 | 34 | 41 | David Green | Larry Hedrick Motorsports | Chevrolet | 169 | 0 | running | 64 | $33,340 |
| 34 | 4 | 42 | Joe Nemechek | Team SABCO | Chevrolet | 168 | 1 | handling | 66 | $40,310 |
| 35 | 22 | 28 | Kenny Irwin Jr. | Robert Yates Racing | Ford | 164 | 0 | running | 58 | $39,580 |
| 36 | 12 | 31 | Mike Skinner | Richard Childress Racing | Chevrolet | 157 | 5 | running | 60 | $36,950 |
| 37 | 30 | 1 | Steve Park | Dale Earnhardt, Inc. | Chevrolet | 154 | 0 | running | 52 | $36,790 |
| 38 | 13 | 24 | Jeff Gordon | Hendrick Motorsports | Chevrolet | 112 | 0 | handling | 49 | $55,250 |
| 39 | 27 | 5 | Terry Labonte | Hendrick Motorsports | Chevrolet | 109 | 0 | rear end | 46 | $44,250 |
| 40 | 19 | 36 | Ernie Irvan | MB2 Motorsports | Pontiac | 53 | 0 | too slow | 43 | $36,050 |
| 41 | 5 | 2 | Rusty Wallace | Penske-Kranefuss Racing | Ford | 50 | 0 | crash | 40 | $44,925 |
| 42 | 9 | 97 | Chad Little | Roush Racing | Ford | 48 | 0 | crash | 37 | $35,650 |
| 43 | 37 | 11 | Brett Bodine | Brett Bodine Racing | Ford | 48 | 0 | crash | 34 | $35,656 |
Failed to qualify
| 44 | | 30 | Derrike Cope | Bahari Racing | Pontiac | | | | | |
| 45 | | 84 | Ken Bouchard | PBH Motorsports | Chevrolet | | | | | |
| 46 | | 50 | Dan Pardus | Midwest Transit Racing | Chevrolet | | | | | |
| 47 | | 91 | Dick Trickle | LJ Racing | Chevrolet | | | | | |
| 48 | | 90 | Loy Allen Jr. | Donlavey Racing | Ford | | | | | |
Official race results

| Previous race: 1999 Goody's Body Pain 500 | NASCAR Winston Cup Series; 1999 season | Next race: 1999 California 500 |
