= 1999 TranSouth Financial 400 =

Fifth race of the 1999 NASCAR Winston Cup Series

Race details
- Race 5 of 34 in the 1999 NASCAR Winston Cup Series
- The 1999 TranSouth Financial 400 program cover, featuring Dale Jarrett.
- Date: March 21, 1999
- Official name: 43rd Annual TranSouth Financial 400
- Location: Darlington, South Carolina, Darlington Raceway
- Course: Permanent racing facility
- Course length: 1.366 miles (2.198 km)
- Distance: 164 laps, 224.024 mi (360.531 km)
- Scheduled distance: 293 laps, 400.238 mi (644.12 km)
- Average speed: 121.294 miles per hour (195.204 km/h)
- Attendance: 71,000

Pole position
Driver	Jeff Gordon	Hendrick Motorsports
- Time: 28.398

Most laps led
Driver	Jeff Burton	Roush Racing
- Laps: 59

Winner
No. 99	Jeff Burton	Roush Racing

Television in the United States
- Network: ESPN
- Announcers: Bob Jenkins, Ned Jarrett, Benny Parsons

Radio in the United States
- Radio: Motor Racing Network

The 1999 TranSouth Financial 400 was the fifth stock car race of the 1999 NASCAR Winston Cup Series season and the 43rd iteration of the event. The race was held on Sunday, March 21, 1999, before an audience of 71,000 in Darlington, South Carolina, at Darlington Raceway, a 1.366-mile (2.198 km) permanent egg-shaped oval racetrack. The race was shortened from its scheduled 293 laps to 164 due to rain. In the final laps of the race, a wreck involving five cars, including the leader at the time, Roush Racing driver Jeff Burton would occur in the midst of rain on lap 163. Despite major damage to his car, Burton would manage to keep up with pace car speed and when the race was stopped a lap later due to increasing rain, NASCAR decided to let the race end due to a lack of sunlight. The victory was Burton's seventh career NASCAR Winston Cup Series victory and his second victory of the season. To fill out the top three, Penske-Kranefuss Racing driver Jeremy Mayfield and Hendrick Motorsports driver Jeff Gordon would finish second and third, respectively.

Future champion Matt Kenseth took over for Bobby Labonte at the second caution, and finished 10th.

== Background ==
The layout of Darlington Raceway, the venue where the race was held.

Darlington Raceway is a race track built for NASCAR racing located near Darlington, South Carolina. It is nicknamed "The Lady in Black" and "The Track Too Tough to Tame" by many NASCAR fans and drivers and advertised as "A NASCAR Tradition." It is of a unique, somewhat egg-shaped design, an oval with the ends of very different configurations, a condition which supposedly arose from the proximity of one end of the track to a minnow pond the owner refused to relocate. This situation makes it very challenging for the crews to set up their cars' handling in a way that is effective at both ends.

=== Entry list ===
- (R) denotes rookie driver.

#	Driver	Team	Make
00	Buckshot Jones (R)	Buckshot Racing	Pontiac
1	Steve Park	Dale Earnhardt, Inc.	Chevrolet
2	Rusty Wallace	Penske-Kranefuss Racing	Ford
3	Dale Earnhardt	Richard Childress Racing	Chevrolet
4	Bobby Hamilton	Morgan–McClure Motorsports	Chevrolet
5	Terry Labonte	Hendrick Motorsports	Chevrolet
6	Mark Martin	Roush Racing	Ford
7	Michael Waltrip	Mattei Motorsports	Chevrolet
9	Jerry Nadeau	Melling Racing	Ford
10	Ricky Rudd	Rudd Performance Motorsports	Ford
11	Brett Bodine	Brett Bodine Racing	Ford
12	Jeremy Mayfield	Penske-Kranefuss Racing	Ford
16	Kevin Lepage	Roush Racing	Ford
18	Bobby Labonte	Joe Gibbs Racing	Pontiac
20	Tony Stewart (R)	Joe Gibbs Racing	Pontiac
21	Elliott Sadler (R)	Wood Brothers Racing	Ford
22	Ward Burton	Bill Davis Racing	Pontiac
23	Jimmy Spencer	Haas-Carter Motorsports	Ford
24	Jeff Gordon	Hendrick Motorsports	Chevrolet
25	Wally Dallenbach Jr.	Hendrick Motorsports	Chevrolet
26	Johnny Benson Jr.	Roush Racing	Ford
28	Kenny Irwin Jr.	Robert Yates Racing	Ford
30	Derrike Cope	Bahari Racing	Pontiac
31	Mike Skinner	Richard Childress Racing	Chevrolet
33	Ken Schrader	Andy Petree Racing	Chevrolet
36	Ernie Irvan	MB2 Motorsports	Pontiac
40	Sterling Marlin	Team SABCO	Chevrolet
41	David Green	Larry Hedrick Motorsports	Chevrolet
42	Joe Nemechek	Team SABCO	Chevrolet
43	John Andretti	Petty Enterprises	Pontiac
44	Kyle Petty	Petty Enterprises	Pontiac
45	Rich Bickle	Tyler Jet Motorsports	Pontiac
55	Kenny Wallace	Andy Petree Racing	Chevrolet
58	Ricky Craven	SBIII Motorsports	Ford
60	Geoff Bodine	Joe Bessey Racing	Chevrolet
66	Darrell Waltrip	Haas-Carter Motorsports	Ford
71	Dave Marcis	Marcis Auto Racing	Chevrolet
75	Ted Musgrave	Butch Mock Motorsports	Ford
77	Robert Pressley	Jasper Motorsports	Ford
88	Dale Jarrett	Robert Yates Racing	Ford
90	Ed Berrier	Donlavey Racing	Ford
91	Dick Trickle	LJ Racing	Chevrolet
94	Bill Elliott	Bill Elliott Racing	Ford
97	Chad Little	Roush Racing	Ford
98	Rick Mast	Cale Yarborough Motorsports	Ford
99	Jeff Burton	Roush Racing	Ford
Official entry list

== Practice ==
=== First practice ===
The first practice session was held on Friday, March 19, at 11:00 AM EST. The session would last for one hour and 15 minutes. Bill Elliott, driving for his own Bill Elliott Racing team, would set the fastest time in the session, with a lap of 28.783 and an average speed of 170.850 mph (274.956 km/h).

Pos.	#	Driver	Team	Make	Time	Speed
1	94	Bill Elliott	Bill Elliott Racing	Ford	28.783	170.850
2	24	Jeff Gordon	Hendrick Motorsports	Chevrolet	28.829	170.578
3	6	Mark Martin	Roush Racing	Ford	28.839	170.519
Full first practice results

=== Second practice ===
The second practice session was held on Friday, March 19, at 1:00 PM EST. The session would last for 55 minutes. Jeff Gordon, driving for Hendrick Motorsports, would set the fastest time in the session, with a lap of 28.688 and an average speed of 171.416 mph (275.867 km/h).

Pos.	#	Driver	Team	Make	Time	Speed
1	24	Jeff Gordon	Hendrick Motorsports	Chevrolet	28.688	171.416
2	6	Mark Martin	Roush Racing	Ford	28.703	171.327
3	26	Johnny Benson Jr.	Roush Racing	Ford	28.810	170.690
Full second practice results

=== Final practice ===
The final practice session, sometimes referred to as Happy Hour, was held on Saturday, March 20, after the preliminary 1999 Diamond Hill Plywood 200 NASCAR Busch Series race. The session would last for one hour. Mark Martin, driving for Roush Racing, would set the fastest time in the session, with a lap of 29.821 and an average speed of 164.904 mph (265.387 km/h).

Pos.	#	Driver	Team	Make	Time	Speed
1	6	Mark Martin	Roush Racing	Ford	29.821	164.904
2	31	Mike Skinner	Richard Childress Racing	Chevrolet	29.845	164.771
3	88	Dale Jarrett	Robert Yates Racing	Ford	29.878	164.589
Full Happy Hour practice results

== Qualifying ==
Qualifying was split into two rounds. The first round was held on Friday, March 19, at 3:30 PM EST. Each driver would have one lap to set a time. During the first round, the top 25 drivers in the round would be guaranteed a starting spot in the race. If a driver was not able to guarantee a spot in the first round, they had the option to scrub their time from the first round and try and run a faster lap time in a second round qualifying run, held on Saturday, March 20, at 11:30 AM EST. As with the first round, each driver would have one lap to set a time. Positions 26-36 would be decided on time, while positions 37-43 would be based on provisionals. Six spots are awarded by the use of provisionals based on owner's points. The seventh is awarded to a past champion who has not otherwise qualified for the race. If no past champion needs the provisional, the next team in the owner points will be awarded a provisional.

Jeff Gordon, driving for Hendrick Motorsports, would win the pole, setting a time of 28.398 and an average speed of 173.167 miles per hour (278.685 km/h) in the first round.

Three drivers would fail to qualify.

=== Full qualifying results ===
Pos.	#	Driver	Team	Make	Time	Speed
1	24	Jeff Gordon	Hendrick Motorsports	Chevrolet	28.398	173.167
2	26	Johnny Benson Jr.	Roush Racing	Ford	28.501	172.541
3	6	Mark Martin	Roush Racing	Ford	28.611	171.878
4	31	Mike Skinner	Richard Childress Racing	Chevrolet	28.619	171.830
5	43	John Andretti	Petty Enterprises	Pontiac	28.627	171.782
6	98	Rick Mast	Cale Yarborough Motorsports	Ford	28.630	171.764
7	16	Kevin Lepage	Roush Racing	Ford	28.630	171.764
8	94	Bill Elliott	Bill Elliott Racing	Ford	28.634	171.740
9	99	Jeff Burton	Roush Racing	Ford	28.651	171.638
10	20	Tony Stewart (R)	Joe Gibbs Racing	Pontiac	28.673	171.506
11	12	Jeremy Mayfield	Penske-Kranefuss Racing	Ford	28.686	171.429
12	42	Joe Nemechek	Team SABCO	Chevrolet	28.686	171.429
13	7	Michael Waltrip	Mattei Motorsports	Chevrolet	28.693	171.387
14	28	Kenny Irwin Jr.	Robert Yates Racing	Ford	28.704	171.321
15	21	Elliott Sadler (R)	Wood Brothers Racing	Ford	28.711	171.279
16	60	Geoff Bodine	Joe Bessey Racing	Chevrolet	28.717	171.244
17	4	Bobby Hamilton	Morgan–McClure Motorsports	Chevrolet	28.743	171.089
18	77	Robert Pressley	Jasper Motorsports	Ford	28.755	171.017
19	11	Brett Bodine	Brett Bodine Racing	Ford	28.764	170.964
20	40	Sterling Marlin	Team SABCO	Chevrolet	28.772	170.916
21	88	Dale Jarrett	Robert Yates Racing	Ford	28.785	170.839
22	97	Chad Little	Roush Racing	Ford	28.799	170.756
23	55	Kenny Wallace	Andy Petree Racing	Chevrolet	28.808	170.703
24	23	Jimmy Spencer	Haas-Carter Motorsports	Ford	28.814	170.667
25	33	Ken Schrader	Andy Petree Racing	Chevrolet	28.822	170.620
Failed to lock in Round 1
26	2	Rusty Wallace	Penske-Kranefuss Racing	Ford	28.824	170.608
27	5	Terry Labonte	Hendrick Motorsports	Chevrolet	28.831	170.566
28	22	Ward Burton	Bill Davis Racing	Pontiac	28.836	170.537
29	1	Steve Park	Dale Earnhardt, Inc.	Chevrolet	28.852	170.442
30	3	Dale Earnhardt	Richard Childress Racing	Chevrolet	28.872	170.324
31	91	Dick Trickle	LJ Racing	Chevrolet	28.873	170.318
32	00	Buckshot Jones (R)	Buckshot Racing	Pontiac	28.931	169.977
33	9	Jerry Nadeau	Melling Racing	Ford	28.937	169.942
34	18	Bobby Labonte	Joe Gibbs Racing	Pontiac	28.959	169.812
35	41	David Green	Larry Hedrick Motorsports	Chevrolet	28.959	169.812
36	44	Kyle Petty	Petty Enterprises	Pontiac	28.959	169.812
Provisionals
37	36	Ernie Irvan	MB2 Motorsports	Pontiac	28.979	169.695
38	25	Wally Dallenbach Jr.	Hendrick Motorsports	Chevrolet	29.020	169.456
39	66	Darrell Waltrip	Haas-Carter Motorsports	Ford	29.112	168.920
40	75	Ted Musgrave	Butch Mock Motorsports	Ford	29.036	169.362
41	10	Ricky Rudd	Rudd Performance Motorsports	Ford	29.017	169.473
42	58	Ricky Craven	SBIII Motorsports	Ford	29.022	169.444
43	90	Ed Berrier	Donlavey Racing	Ford	29.622	166.012
Failed to qualify
44	30	Derrike Cope	Bahari Racing	Pontiac	28.986	169.654
45	71	Dave Marcis	Marcis Auto Racing	Chevrolet	29.015	169.485
46	45	Rich Bickle	Tyler Jet Motorsports	Pontiac	29.384	167.356
Official starting lineup

== Race results ==
Fin	St	#	Driver	Team	Make	Laps	Led	Status	Pts	Winnings
1	9	99	Jeff Burton	Roush Racing	Ford	164	59	running	185	$161,900
2	11	12	Jeremy Mayfield	Penske-Kranefuss Racing	Ford	164	48	running	175	$62,455
3	1	24	Jeff Gordon	Hendrick Motorsports	Chevrolet	164	50	running	170	$83,940
4	21	88	Dale Jarrett	Robert Yates Racing	Ford	164	0	running	160	$60,305
5	3	6	Mark Martin	Roush Racing	Ford	164	2	running	160	$50,500
6	10	20	Tony Stewart (R)	Joe Gibbs Racing	Pontiac	164	0	running	150	$44,240
7	17	4	Bobby Hamilton	Morgan–McClure Motorsports	Chevrolet	164	0	running	146	$49,245
8	28	22	Ward Burton	Bill Davis Racing	Pontiac	164	0	running	142	$47,640
9	5	43	John Andretti	Petty Enterprises	Pontiac	164	1	running	143	$40,885
10	34	18	Bobby Labonte	Joe Gibbs Racing	Pontiac	164	1	running	139	$51,595
11	27	5	Terry Labonte	Hendrick Motorsports	Chevrolet	164	0	running	130	$40,125
12	29	1	Steve Park	Dale Earnhardt, Inc.	Chevrolet	164	1	running	132	$36,220
13	6	98	Rick Mast	Cale Yarborough Motorsports	Ford	163	0	running	124	$29,465
14	8	94	Bill Elliott	Bill Elliott Racing	Ford	163	0	running	121	$35,485
15	18	77	Robert Pressley	Jasper Motorsports	Ford	163	0	running	118	$30,745
16	20	40	Sterling Marlin	Team SABCO	Chevrolet	163	0	running	115	$35,060
17	16	60	Geoff Bodine	Joe Bessey Racing	Chevrolet	163	0	running	112	$23,515
18	2	26	Johnny Benson Jr.	Roush Racing	Ford	163	0	running	109	$34,945
19	12	42	Joe Nemechek	Team SABCO	Chevrolet	163	0	running	106	$33,765
20	24	23	Jimmy Spencer	Haas-Carter Motorsports	Ford	163	0	running	103	$36,560
21	13	7	Michael Waltrip	Mattei Motorsports	Chevrolet	163	0	running	100	$33,080
22	7	16	Kevin Lepage	Roush Racing	Ford	163	0	running	97	$33,165
23	23	55	Kenny Wallace	Andy Petree Racing	Chevrolet	163	0	running	94	$23,050
24	37	36	Ernie Irvan	MB2 Motorsports	Pontiac	163	0	running	91	$32,235
25	30	3	Dale Earnhardt	Richard Childress Racing	Chevrolet	163	0	running	88	$37,020
26	31	91	Dick Trickle	LJ Racing	Chevrolet	163	0	running	85	$25,285
27	41	10	Ricky Rudd	Rudd Performance Motorsports	Ford	163	0	running	82	$31,400
28	22	97	Chad Little	Roush Racing	Ford	163	0	running	79	$31,145
29	40	75	Ted Musgrave	Butch Mock Motorsports	Ford	163	2	running	81	$24,240
30	19	11	Brett Bodine	Brett Bodine Racing	Ford	163	0	running	73	$30,535
31	36	44	Kyle Petty	Petty Enterprises	Pontiac	162	0	running	70	$20,655
32	4	31	Mike Skinner	Richard Childress Racing	Chevrolet	162	0	running	67	$27,525
33	26	2	Rusty Wallace	Penske-Kranefuss Racing	Ford	162	0	running	64	$36,345
34	32	00	Buckshot Jones (R)	Buckshot Racing	Pontiac	162	0	running	61	$20,215
35	14	28	Kenny Irwin Jr.	Robert Yates Racing	Ford	161	0	crash	58	$27,085
36	15	21	Elliott Sadler (R)	Wood Brothers Racing	Ford	161	0	running	55	$26,955
37	42	58	Ricky Craven	SBIII Motorsports	Ford	160	0	crash	52	$19,850
38	38	25	Wally Dallenbach Jr.	Hendrick Motorsports	Chevrolet	159	0	running	49	$26,725
39	43	90	Ed Berrier	Donlavey Racing	Ford	159	0	running	46	$26,600
40	33	9	Jerry Nadeau	Melling Racing	Ford	158	0	running	43	$19,475
41	39	66	Darrell Waltrip	Haas-Carter Motorsports	Ford	141	0	running	40	$19,350
42	35	41	David Green	Larry Hedrick Motorsports	Chevrolet	129	0	running	37	$19,225
43	25	33	Ken Schrader	Andy Petree Racing	Chevrolet	75	0	running	34	$30,416
Failed to qualify
44		30	Derrike Cope	Bahari Racing	Pontiac					
45		71	Dave Marcis	Marcis Auto Racing	Chevrolet					
46		45	Rich Bickle	Tyler Jet Motorsports	Pontiac					
Official race results

Previous race: 1999 Cracker Barrel 500	NASCAR Winston Cup Series; 1999 season	Next race: 1999 Primestar 500
