= 1999 NAPA 500 =

Race details
- Race 34 of 34 in the 1999 NASCAR Winston Cup Series season
- The 1999 NAPA 500 program cover, featuring past champions. The program cover includes Darrell Waltrip, Bill Elliott, Richard Petty, Jeff Gordon, Dale Earnhardt, and Dale Jarrett. "The Last Race of the Century!"
- Date: November 21, 1999
- Official name: NAPA 500
- Location: Atlanta Motor Speedway, Hampton, Georgia
- Course: Permanent racing facility
- Course length: 1.540 miles (2.478 km)
- Distance: 325 laps, 500.500 mi (805.477 km)
- Weather: Temperatures reaching up to 64 °F (18 °C); wind speeds reaching up to 8.9 miles per hour (14.3 km/h)
- Average speed: 137.932 miles per hour (221.980 km/h)
- Attendance: 165,000

Pole position
Driver	Kevin Lepage	Jack Roush
- Time: 28.617

Most laps led
Driver	Bobby Labonte	Joe Gibbs Racing
- Laps: 147

Winner
No. 18	Bobby Labonte	Joe Gibbs Racing

Television in the United States
- Network: ESPN
- Announcers: Bob Jenkins; Benny Parsons; Ned Jarrett

The 1999 NAPA 500 was a NASCAR Winston Cup Series racing event held on November 21, 1999, at Atlanta Motor Speedway in Hampton, Georgia. It was the 34th and final race of the 1999 NASCAR Winston Cup Series season.

The layout of Atlanta Motor Speedway, where the race was held.

== Background ==
Atlanta Motor Speedway is one of ten intermediate to hold NASCAR races. The standard track at Atlanta Motor Speedway is a four-turn quad-oval track that is 1.54 miles (2.48 km) long. The track's turns are banked at twenty-four degrees, while the front stretch, the location of the finish line, and the back stretch are banked at five.

=== Entry list ===
#	Driver	Team	Make
00	Buckshot Jones	Buckshot Racing	Pontiac
1	Steve Park	Dale Earnhardt, Inc.	Chevrolet
2	Rusty Wallace	Penske-Kranefuss Racing	Ford
3	Dale Earnhardt Sr.	Richard Childress Racing	Chevrolet
4	Bobby Hamilton	Morgan-McClure Motorsports	Chevrolet
5	Terry Labonte	Hendrick Motorsports	Chevrolet
05	Morgan Shepherd	Shepherd Racing	Pontiac
6	Mark Martin	Roush Racing	Ford
7	Michael Waltrip	Mattei Motorsports	Chevrolet
8	Dale Earnhardt Jr.	Dale Earnhardt, Inc.	Chevrolet
9	Stacy Compton	Melling Racing	Ford
10	Ricky Rudd	Rudd Performance Motorsports	Ford
11	Brett Bodine	Brett Bodine Racing	Ford
12	Jeremy Mayfield	Penske-Kranefuss Racing	Ford
15	Derrike Cope	Fenley-Moore Motorsports	Ford
16	Kevin Lepage	Roush Racing	Ford
18	Bobby Labonte	Joe Gibbs Racing	Pontiac
20	Tony Stewart	Joe Gibbs Racing	Pontiac
21	Elliott Sadler	Wood Brothers Racing	Ford
22	Ward Burton	Bill Davis Racing	Pontiac
23	Jimmy Spencer	Haas-Carter Motorsports	Ford
24	Jeff Gordon	Hendrick Motorsports	Chevrolet
25	Wally Dallenbach Jr.	Hendrick Motorsports	Chevrolet
26	Johnny Benson Jr.	Roush Racing	Ford
28	Kenny Irwin Jr.	Robert Yates Racing	Ford
30	Todd Bodine	Eel River Racing	Pontiac
31	Mike Skinner	Richard Childress Racing	Chevrolet
33	Ken Schrader	Andy Petree Racing	Chevrolet
36	Jerry Nadeau	MB2 Motorsports	Pontiac
40	Sterling Marlin	SABCO Racing	Chevrolet
41	Gary Bradberry	Larry Hedrick Motorsports	Chevrolet
42	Joe Nemechek	SABCO Racing	Chevrolet
43	John Andretti	Petty Enterprises	Pontiac
44	Kyle Petty	Petty Enterprises	Pontiac
45	David Green	Tyler Jet Motorsports	Pontiac
50	Ricky Craven	Midwest Transit Racing	Chevrolet
55	Kenny Wallace	Andy Petree Racing	Chevrolet
60	Geoff Bodine	Joe Bessey Motorsports	Chevrolet
66	Darrell Waltrip	Haas-Carter Motorsports	Ford
71	Dave Marcis	Marcis Auto Racing	Chevrolet
75	Hut Stricklin	Galaxy Motorsports	Ford
77	Robert Pressley	Jasper Motorsports	Ford
88	Dale Jarrett	Robert Yates Racing	Ford
90	Ed Berrier	Donlavey Racing	Ford
93	Dave Blaney	Bill Davis Racing	Pontiac
94	Bill Elliott	Bill Elliott Racing	Ford
97	Chad Little	Roush Racing	Ford
98	Rick Mast	Cale Yarborough Motorsports	Ford
99	Jeff Burton	Roush Racing	Ford

== Qualifying ==
Pos.	#	Driver	Make	Team	Time	Speed
1	16	Kevin Lepage	Ford	Roush Racing	28.617	193.731
2	1	Steve Park	Chevrolet	Dale Earnhardt, Inc.	28.641	193.569
3	6	Mark Martin (W)	Ford	Roush Racing	28.697	193.191
4	60	Geoffrey Bodine	Chevrolet	Joe Bessey Motorsports	28.702	193.157
5	30	Todd Bodine	Pontiac	Eel River Racing	28.736	192.929
6	22	Ward Burton	Pontiac	Bill Davis Racing	28.781	192.627
7	93	Dave Blaney (R)	Pontiac	Bill Davis Racing	28.831	192.293
8	7	Michael Waltrip	Chevrolet	Mattei Motorsports	28.842	192.220
9	41	Gary Bradberry	Chevrolet	Larry Hedrick Motorsports	28.887	191.920
10	88	Dale Jarrett	Ford	Robert Yates Racing	28.892	191.887
11	00	Buckshot Jones (R)	Pontiac	Buckshot Racing	28.909	191.774
12	97	Chad Little	Ford	Roush Racing	28.918	191.715
13	8	Dale Earnhardt Jr. (R)	Chevrolet	Dale Earnhardt, Inc.	28.927	191.655
14	99	Jeff Burton	Ford	Roush Racing	28.942	191.556
15	10	Ricky Rudd	Ford	Rudd Performance Motorsports	28.948	191.516
16	24	Jeff Gordon (W)	Chevrolet	Hendrick Motorsports	28.955	191.470
17	26	Johnny Benson Jr.	Ford	Roush Racing	28.956	191.463
18	40	Sterling Marlin	Chevrolet	SABCO Racing	28.967	191.390
19	2	Rusty Wallace (W)	Ford	Penske-Kranefuss Racing	28.977	191.324
20	33	Ken Schrader	Chevrolet	Andy Petree Racing	29.016	191.067
21	36	Jerry Nadeau	Pontiac	MB2 Motorsports	29.023	191.021
22	90	Ed Berrier (R)	Ford	Donlavey Racing	29.031	190.968
23	12	Jeremy Mayfield	Ford	Penske-Kranefuss Racing	29.034	190.949
24	23	Jimmy Spencer	Ford	Haas-Carter Motorsports	29.034	190.949
25	28	Kenny Irwin Jr.	Ford	Robert Yates Racing	29.034	190.949
26	98	Rick Mast	Ford	Cale Yarborough Motorsports	28.996	191.199
27	94	Bill Elliott (W)	Ford	Bill Elliott Racing	29.034	190.949
28	42	Joe Nemechek	Chevrolet	SABCO Racing	29.075	190.679
29	25	Wally Dallenbach Jr.	Chevrolet	Hendrick Motorsports	29.080	190.646
30	20	Tony Stewart (R)	Pontiac	Joe Gibbs Racing	29.092	190.568
31	77	Robert Pressley	Ford	Jasper Motorsports	29.118	190.398
32	55	Kenny Wallace	Chevrolet	Andy Petree Racing	29.130	190.319
33	43	John Andretti	Pontiac	Petty Enterprises	29.141	190.247
34	21	Elliott Sadler (R)	Ford	Wood Brothers Racing	29.189	189.935
35	4	Bobby Hamilton	Chevrolet	Morgan-McClure Motorsports	29.203	189.844
36	3	Dale Earnhardt (W)	Chevrolet	Richard Childress Racing	29.207	189.818
Provisionals
37	18	Bobby Labonte (W)	Pontiac	Joe Gibbs Racing		
38	31	Mike Skinner	Chevrolet	Richard Childress Racing		
39	5	Terry Labonte	Chevrolet	Hendrick Motorsports		
40	44	Kyle Petty	Pontiac	Petty Enterprises		
41	45	David Green	Pontiac	Tyler Jet Motorsports		
42	11	Brett Bodine	Ford	Brett Bodine Racing		
43	71	Dave Marcis (W)	Chevrolet	Marcis Auto Racing		
Failed to qualify
44	66	Darrell Waltrip (W)	Ford	Haas-Carter Motorsports	29.414	188.482
45	15	Derrike Cope	Ford	Fenley-Moore Motorsports	29.459	188.194
46	75	Hut Stricklin	Ford	Galaxy Motorsports	29.501	187.926
47	50	Ricky Craven	Chevrolet	Midwest Transit Racing	29.542	187.665
48	9	Stacy Compton (R)	Ford	Melling Racing	29.668	186.868
49	05	Morgan Shepherd (W)	Pontiac	Shepherd Racing	29.935	185.201

== Summary ==
Out of the 49 drivers who were on the entry list, only 43 drivers managed to make the race. Two of the more notable drivers who did not qualify were Darrell Waltrip and Morgan Shepherd. There were numerous accidents causing a series of yellow flags. Each green flag run was 30 laps while more than 16% of the race was run under a caution flag.

Todd Bodine was the last-place finisher of this 325-lap event that lasted for a duration of three and a half hours. Kevin Lepage was the lucky pole position winner with his solo qualifying speed of 193.731 mph (311.780 km/h). A live audience of 165,000 NASCAR enthusiasts came to see 38 different lead changes along with eight cautions lasting 53 laps. The average speed of the race was clocked at 137.932 mph (221.980 km/h); with Bobby Labonte having a 2.5 second edge over Dale Jarrett. In addition, the pole position was Kevin Lepage's for the only time in his NASCAR career.

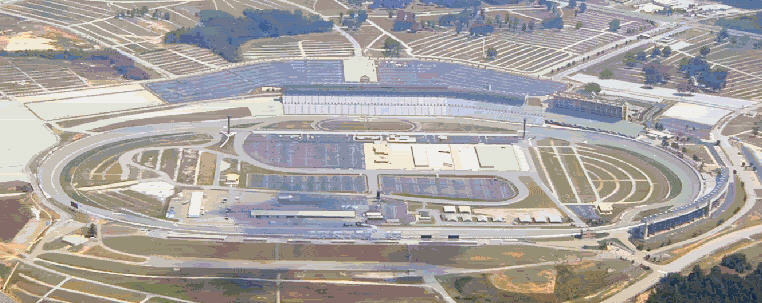
Atlanta Motor Speedway, the race track where the race was held

Chevrolet and Ford vehicles were the dominant vehicles in the lineup. Ten drivers failed to finish the race, including Joe Nemechek. This was the final race for Rudd Performance Motorsports and the #10 Tide ride. It was also the final race for Ken Schrader in the #33 car before moving to MB2 Motorsports in 2000. This was also the final race for Jerry Nadeau competing in the #36 car before making the move to Hendrick Motorsports in 2000. This was the last race without Matt Kenseth until the 2015 AAA Texas 500.

Notable crew chiefs who actively participated in the race included Robin Pemberton, Larry McReynolds, Travis Carter, Todd Parrott, and Junie Donlavey.

The total prize amount offered to the drivers was $2,232,402 ($4,314,520 when adjusted for inflation); the winner received $174,300 ($336,866 when adjusted for inflation) while the last-place finisher received a meager $33,507 ($64,758 when adjusted for inflation).

== Results ==
Pos	Grid	Car	Driver	Make	Team	Laps	Led	Status	Winnings
1	37	18	Bobby Labonte (W)	Pontiac	Joe Gibbs Racing	325	147	Running	$174,300
2	10	88	Dale Jarrett	Ford	Robert Yates Racing	325	17	Running	$94,400
3	23	12	Jeremy Mayfield	Ford	Penske-Kranefuss Racing	325	27	Running	$75,875
4	3	6	Mark Martin (W)	Ford	Roush Racing	325	17	Running	$75,750
5	14	99	Jeff Burton	Ford	Roush Racing	325	3	Running	$70,000
6	12	97	Chad Little	Ford	Roush Racing	325	0	Running	$58,800
7	15	10	Ricky Rudd	Ford	Rudd Performance Motorsports	325	0	Running	$61,955
8	38	31	Mike Skinner	Chevrolet	Richard Childress Racing	325	0	Running	$57,125
9	36	3	Dale Earnhardt (W)	Chevrolet	Richard Childress Racing	325	0	Running	$54,550
10	35	4	Bobby Hamilton	Chevrolet	Morgan-McClure Motorsports	325	0	Running	$66,265
11	6	22	Ward Burton	Pontiac	Bill Davis Racing	325	0	Running	$55,550
12	2	1	Steve Park	Chevrolet	Dale Earnhardt, Inc.	325	72	Running	$56,775
13	19	2	Rusty Wallace (W)	Ford	Penske-Kranefuss Racing	324	0	-1 Laps	$53,950
14	13	8	Dale Earnhardt Jr. (R)	Chevrolet	Dale Earnhardt, Inc.	324	1	-1 Laps	$37,700
15	30	20	Tony Stewart (R)	Pontiac	Joe Gibbs Racing	324	1	-1 Laps	$55,815
16	34	21	Elliott Sadler (R)	Ford	Wood Brothers Racing	324	2	-1 Laps	$49,400
17	1	16	Kevin Lepage	Ford	Roush Racing	323	17	-2 Laps	$59,980
18	4	60	Geoffrey Bodine	Chevrolet	Joe Bessey Motorsports	323	0	-2 Laps	$40,565
19	20	33	Ken Schrader	Chevrolet	Andy Petree Racing	323	0	-2 Laps	$40,565
20	21	36	Jerry Nadeau	Pontiac	MB2 Motorsports	323	0	-2 Laps	$48,025
21	41	45	David Green	Pontiac	Tyler Jet Motorsports	323	0	-2 Laps	$48,950
22	27	94	Bill Elliott (W)	Ford	Bill Elliott Racing	323	0	-2 Laps	$39,720
23	29	25	Wally Dallenbach Jr.	Chevrolet	Hendrick Motorsports	322	0	-3 Laps	$45,365
24	40	44	Kyle Petty	Pontiac	Petty Enterprises	321	1	-4 Laps	$38,150
25	22	90	Ed Berrier (R)	Ford	Donlavey Racing	321	0	-4 Laps	$34,535
26	11	00	Buckshot Jones (R)	Pontiac	Buckshot Racing	321	0	-4 Laps	$34,720
27	31	77	Robert Pressley	Ford	Jasper Motorsports	319	0	-6 Laps	$37,505
28	43	71	Dave Marcis (W)	Chevrolet	Marcis Auto Racing	319	3	-6 Laps	$34,490
29	25	28	Kenny Irwin Jr.	Ford	Robert Yates Racing	319	0	-6 Laps	$44,530
30	42	11	Brett Bodine	Ford	Brett Bodine Racing	317	0	-8 Laps	$44,280
31	18	40	Sterling Marlin	Chevrolet	SABCO Racing	314	0	-11 Laps	$43,990
32	28	42	Joe Nemechek	Chevrolet	SABCO Racing	303	0	Engine	$43,400
33	33	43	John Andretti	Pontiac	Petty Enterprises	242	0	Contact	$48,835
34	32	55	Kenny Wallace	Chevrolet	Andy Petree Racing	235	0	-90 Laps	$34,270
35	9	41	Gary Bradberry	Chevrolet	Larry Hedrick Motorsports	233	0	Engine	$33,705
36	8	7	Michael Waltrip	Chevrolet	Mattei Motorsports	196	12	Contact T4	$41,870
37	7	93	Dave Blaney (R)	Pontiac	Bill Davis Racing	182	0	Contact T4	$33,600
38	16	24	Jeff Gordon (W)	Chevrolet	Hendrick Motorsports	181	0	Engine	$59,350
39	17	26	Johnny Benson Jr.	Ford	Roush Racing	172	4	Contact BS	$40,900
40	39	5	Terry Labonte	Chevrolet	Hendrick Motorsports	148	0	Contact T4	$48,450
41	26	98	Rick Mast	Ford	Cale Yarborough Motorsports	131	0	-194 Laps	$35,400
42	24	23	Jimmy Spencer	Ford	Haas-Carter Motorsports	80	0	Contact T2	$40,350
43	5	30	Todd Bodine	Pontiac	Eel River Racing	42	0	Contact T2	$33,507
Failed to Qualify
		66	Darrell Waltrip (W)	Ford	Haas-Carter Motorsports				
		15	Derrike Cope	Ford	Fenley-Moore Motorsports				
		75	Hut Stricklin	Ford	Galaxy Motorsports				
		50	Ricky Craven	Chevrolet	Midwest Transit Racing				
		9	Stacy Compton (R)	Ford	Melling Racing				
		05	Morgan Shepherd (W)	Pontiac	Shepherd Racing				

Preceded by 1999 Pennzoil 400	NASCAR Winston Cup Series Season; 1999-2000	Succeeded by 2000 Daytona 500
