= SBIII Motorsports =

Former NASCAR team

- Owner(s): Scott Barbour
- Base: Huntersville, North Carolina, United States
- Series: Sprint Cup Series
- Race drivers: Ricky Craven; Loy Allen, Jr. Sean Woodside; Hut Stricklin
- Manufacturer: Ford

Career
- Debut: 1998 Coca-Cola 500 (Motegi)
- Latest race: 1999 NAPA AutoCare 500 (Martinsville)
- Drivers' Championships: 0
- Race victories: 0
- Pole positions: 0

SBIII Motorsports is a former NASCAR Cup Series motor racing team. The team was owned by Pittsburgh, Pennsylvania businessman Scott Barbour and fielded the No. 58 Ford Taurus during the 1999 NASCAR Winston Cup Series season. The team was named for Barbour's son (Samuel Barbour III) and was painted black and yellow in honor of former Pittsburgh Steelers player Jack Lambert.

== Biography ==
Barbour was born and raised in Pennsylvania, and joined the United States Air Force in 1981. After working for various companies in the United States and Europe, Barbour formed Turbine Solutions in 1992, a privately held aircraft engine supply company and at the time he formed SBIII Motorsports, was president and CEO of the company based out of Brooksville, Florida. Turbine Solutions first entered NASCAR as an associate sponsor on Cale Yarborough Motorsports' No. 98 car in 1998.

== NASCAR season ==
Barbour formed SBIII Motorsports in late 1998. The team debuted at the NASCAR Cup Series' season-ending exhibition race in Motegi, Japan. Based in a shop once used by TriStar Motorsports, Mike Hillman was hired as the team's crew chief and 1995 Rookie of the Year Ricky Craven was hired as driver. He drove the car to a 22nd-place finish in the team's debut. In the team's first points race at the 1999 Daytona 500, Craven started 28th and finished 26th. The team also acquired sponsorship from Hollywood Video, sharing sponsorship with Mark Gibson's entry for that race. Hollywood Video sponsored the car for the next twelve races, during which time Craven finished no higher than 19th, although he did win a Winston West Series with the team at California Speedway. After failing to qualify for the Coca-Cola 600, Craven was released. Loy Allen was hired as his replacement, missing one race and finishing 40th in both races he started for the team. West Series driver Sean Woodside attempted the Save Mart/Kragen 350 with the team, but did not qualify.

After the Pepsi 400, Hut Stricklin was named the team's new driver. He gave the team's first top-15 finish at Pocono Raceway, and two weeks later, its only top-ten finish with a ninth at Michigan International Speedway. In September, the team acquired sponsorship from Federated Auto Parts, but also failed to qualify for three consecutive races. Late in October, SBIII announced that it had resigned Stricklin to a three-year contract, and acquired Motorsports Safety Technologies as sponsor through the 2003 season. Just over a week later, the team suddenly shut down, citing a bad check from the team's new sponsor.

== Car No. 58 results ==
NASCAR Winston Cup Series results
Year	Driver	No.	Make	1	2	3	4	5	6	7	8	9	10	11	12	13	14	15	16	17	18	19	20	21	22	23	24	25	26	27	28	29	30	31	32	33	34	Owners	Pts
1999	Ricky Craven	58	Ford	DAY; 26	CAR; 22	LVS; 39	ATL; 42	DAR; 37	TEX; 27	BRI; 41	MAR; 43	TAL; 27	CAL; 34	RCH; 19	CLT; DNQ	DOV; 31																						41st	1921
1999	Loy Allen Jr.	58	Ford														MCH; 40	POC; DNQ		DAY; 40																		41st	1921
1999	Sean Woodside	58	Ford																SON; DNQ																			41st	1921
1999	Hut Stricklin	58	Ford																		NHA; 39	POC; 15	IND; 33	GLN; DNQ	MCH; 9	BRI; 27	DAR; 27	RCH; DNQ	NHA; 16	DOV; 25	MAR; 14	CLT; DNQ	TAL; DNQ	CAR; DNQ	PHO	HOM	ATL	41st	1921

== Aftermath ==
After the team's closure, TriStar took over the shop and temporarily used its equipment. It attempted the 2000 Daytona 500 in the No. 48 with Stanton Barrett, but did not qualify. The team's equipment was auctioned off in May 2000.
