= LJ Racing =

Former NASCAR team

- Owner(s): Joe Falk, Ron Neal
- Series: Winston Cup Series
- Race drivers: Mike Wallace, Kevin Lepage, Todd Bodine, Dick Trickle, Morgan Shepherd
- Manufacturer: Chevrolet
- Opened: 1997
- Closed: 2000

Career
- Races competed: 53

LJ Racing was a stock car racing team that competed in the NASCAR Winston Cup Series between 1997 and 2000. Owned by Joe Falk, the team posted a best finish of fifth with driver Todd Bodine, and a best Winston West Series finish of second with Mike Wallace driving. LJ Racing has since been revived as Circle Sport Racing.

== Winston Cup Series ==
=== Car No. 91 history ===
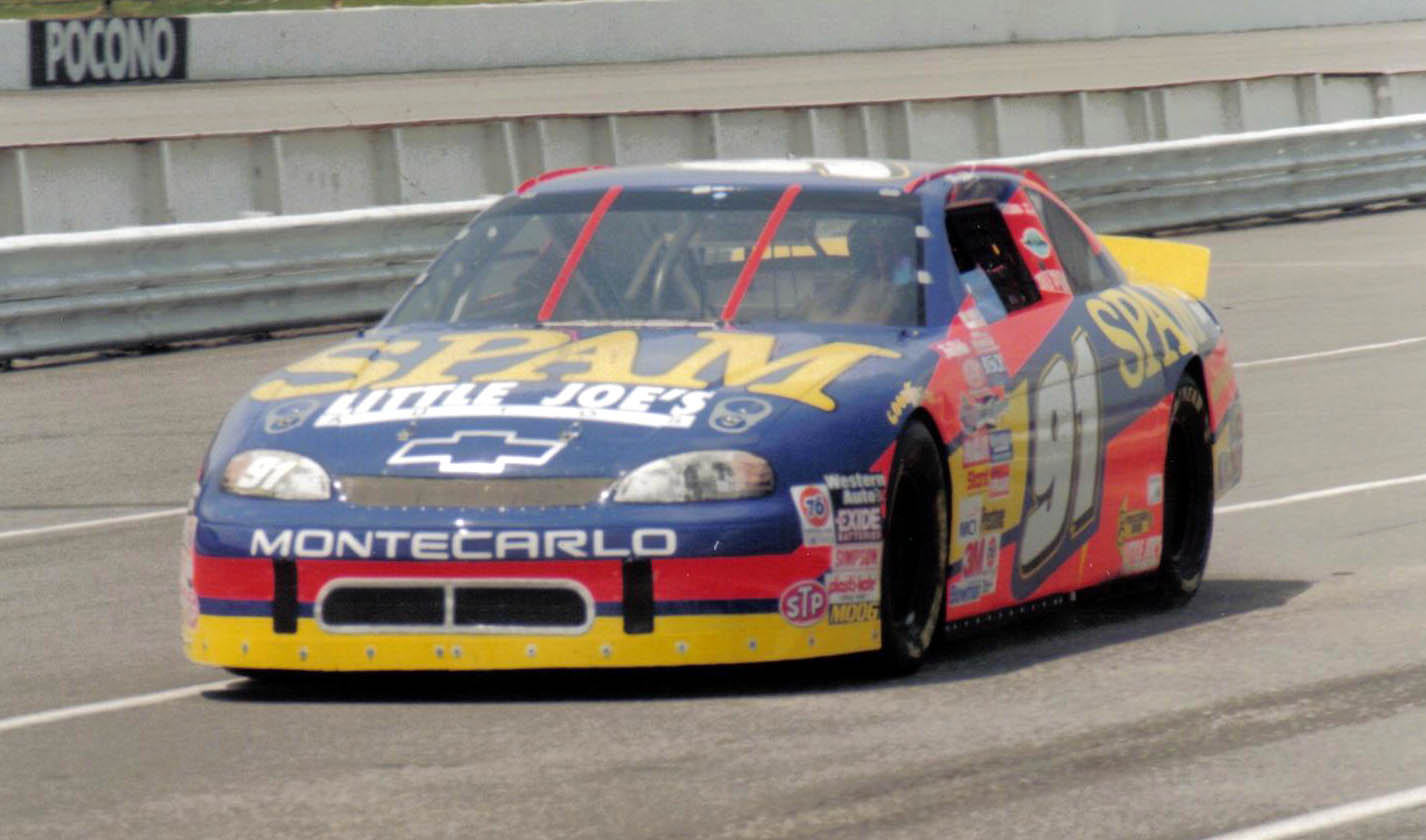
The LJ Racing car at Pocono Raceway in 1997

Virginia businessman Joe Falk entered NASCAR team ownership in the Winston Cup Series in 1997, fielding the No. 91 Chevrolet in a partnership with Ron Neal under the LJ Racing banner. When the team began, Mike Wallace was the driver and Spam was the sponsor. Neal had been running the team as the No. 81 in the Busch Series as ProTech Motorsports.

That year, Wallace posted the team's best finish in any series, in the only Winston West Series race they ever entered, the 1997 Auto Club 200 at California Speedway. Having failed to qualify for the weekend's Winston Cup Series event, they posted a late entry to the West Series race, and Mike Wallace drove from the back of the field to finish second.

In the Winston Cup Series, the team struggled to make races, and Wallace was released midway through the season. Spam left the team shortly thereafter, and several other drivers drove the car later in the year, with little success. Towards the end of the year, Kevin Lepage joined the team. Lepage would drive the No. 91 through the first half of 1998 before leaving to join Roush Racing. He was replaced by Morgan Shepherd, and then Todd Bodine, who would score the team's best finish in the Cup Series, fifth, in the final race of the 1998 season, at Atlanta Motor Speedway.

LJ Racing began the 1999 season with driver Steve Grissom, but after Grissom failed to qualify for two of the first four races, he was replaced by Dick Trickle. For the rest of the season, the team attempted the majority of the races, but only made it into eight: seven with Trickle, and the Winston 500 at Talladega Superspeedway with Andy Hillenburg.

In 2000, the team would qualify for two races (at Atlanta and Richmond) with Todd Bodine driving, before closing down. Later that same year, the team's shop was used by Chip Ganassi Racing with Felix Sabates to house their three NASCAR Busch Series teams. The two teams also entered a No. 91 Chevrolet for Blaise Alexander in two races near the end of the season, but Alexander failed to qualify for both of them.

==== Drivers ====
Driver	Races	Wins	Poles
Todd Bodine	9	0	0
Steve Grissom	2	0	0
Andy Hillenburg	4	0	0
Tommy Kendall	4	0	0
Kevin Lepage	16	0	0
Greg Sacks	1	0	0
Morgan Shepherd	6	0	0
Dick Trickle	7	0	0
Mike Wallace	7	0	0

==== Car No. 91 results ====
NASCAR Winston Cup Series results
Year	Driver	No.	Make	1	2	3	4	5	6	7	8	9	10	11	12	13	14	15	16	17	18	19	20	21	22	23	24	25	26	27	28	29	30	31	32	33	34	Owners	Pts
1997	Mike Wallace	91	Chevy	DAY; DNQ	CAR; DNQ	RCH; DNQ	ATL; 26	DAR; 43	TEX; 17	BRI; DNQ	MAR; 39	SON; 22	TAL; DNQ	CLT; DNQ	DOV; 23	POC; 30	MCH; DNQ	CAL; DNQ																				45th	1182
1997	Loy Allen Jr.	91	Chevy																DAY; DNQ	NHA																		45th	1182
1997	Greg Sacks	91	Chevy																		POC; DNQ	IND; 31	GLN	MCH	BRI	DAR; DNQ												45th	1182
1997	Ron Hornaday Jr.	91	Chevy																								RCH; DNQ											45th	1182
1997	Kevin Lepage	91	Chevy																									NHA; DNQ	DOV	MAR	CLT; 40	TAL; 17	CAR	PHO	ATL; 29			45th	1182
1998	Kevin Lepage	91	Chevy	DAY; 43	CAR; DNQ	LVS; 28	ATL; 14	DAR; 34	BRI; 27	TEX; 37	MAR; 42	TAL; 14	CAL; 40	CLT; 36	DOV; 28	RCH; DNQ	MCH; 40	POC; 19																				35th	2516
1998	Tommy Kendall	91	Chevy																SON; 16																			35th	2516
1998	Andy Hillenburg	91	Chevy																	NHA; 31												TAL; 22	DAY; 24					35th	2516
1998	Morgan Shepherd	91	Chevy																		POC; 40	IND; 15	GLN; 43	MCH; 42	BRI; 29	NHA; 26	DAR; DNQ											35th	2516
1998	Todd Bodine	91	Chevy																									RCH; 32	DOV; 37	MAR; 12	CLT; 15			PHO; 15	CAR; 20	ATL; 5		35th	2516
1999	Steve Grissom	91	Chevy	DAY; DNQ	CAR; 36	LVS; 42	ATL; DNQ																															45th	965
1999	Dick Trickle	91	Chevy					DAR; 26	TEX; DNQ	BRI; 31	MAR; 31	TAL; DNQ	CAL	RCH; 32	CLT; DNQ	DOV; 43	MCH	POC; 40	SON		NHA; 29		IND; DNQ			BRI; DNQ	DAR											45th	965
1999	Hut Stricklin	91	Chevy																	DAY; DNQ																		45th	965
1999	Morgan Shepherd	91	Chevy																			POC; DNQ																45th	965
1999	Jack Baldwin	91	Chevy																					GLN; DNQ	MCH													45th	965
1999	Tom Baldwin	91	Chevy																									RCH; DNQ										45th	965
1999	Derrike Cope	91	Chevy																										NHA; DNQ	DOV; DNQ								45th	965
1999	Tim Fedewa	91	Chevy																												MAR; DNQ							45th	965
1999	Andy Hillenburg	91	Chevy																													CLT; DNQ	TAL; 43					45th	965
1999	Rich Bickle	91	Chevy																															CAR; DNQ	PHO	HOM	ATL	45th	965
2000	Andy Hillenburg	91	Chevy	DAY; DNQ	CAR	LVS																																52nd	281
2000	Todd Bodine	91	Chevy				ATL; 7	DAR	BRI	TEX; DNQ	MAR	TAL	CAL	RCH; 43	CLT	DOV	MCH	POC	SON	DAY	NHA	POC	IND	GLN	MCH	BRI	DAR	RCH	NHA	DOV	MAR							52nd	281
2000	Larry Gunselman	91	Chevy																													CLT; DNQ						52nd	281
2000	Blaise Alexander	91	Chevy																														TAL; DNQ	CAR	PHO	HOM	ATL; DNQ	52nd	281

== Busch Series ==
ProTech Motorsports was founded by Ron Neal and began competition in the NASCAR Busch Series during the 1996 season, with driver Todd Bodine. Running the No. 81 for most of the season, Bodine finished third in series points, scoring one win at South Boston Speedway. In the final race of the year, at Metro-Dade Homestead Motorsports Complex, he ran the No. 82, while Ron Neal's son Jeff Neal ran the team's regular No. 81.

The team was in financial trouble throughout the season, and was partially bought out by Joe Falk to run Winston Cup in 1997. The team ran the first four races of the 1997 NASCAR Busch Series season with Stanton Barrett before switching fully to Winston Cup.

=== Drivers ===
Driver	Races	Wins	Poles
Stanton Barrett	4	0	0
Todd Bodine	26	1	0
Jeff Neal	1	0	0

== ARCA Racing Series ==
For the 2001 season, LJ Racing closed their Winston Cup Series team and moved to the ARCA RE/MAX Series, competing in 21 of the 25 races held that season. The team's main drivers were Blaise Alexander and Joe Falk's son Jeff Falk, with Brent Glastetter and Roger Blackstock each driving in two races, Josh Richeson driving at Charlotte Motor Speedway, and Casey Mears making his ARCA debut in the team's final race at Talladega Superspeedway.

=== Drivers ===
Driver	Races	Wins	Poles
Blaise Alexander	6	0	1
Roger Blackstock	2	0	0
Jeff Falk	9	0	0
Brent Glastetter	2	0	0
Casey Mears	1	0	0
Josh Richeson	1	0	0
