= Buckshot Racing =

Former NASCAR team

- Owner: Billy Jones
- Base: Spartanburg, South Carolina
- Series: Winston Cup, Busch Series
- Race drivers: Buckshot Jones, Todd Bodine
- Manufacturer: Chevrolet, Ford, Pontiac
- Opened: 1995
- Closed: 2002

Career
- Drivers' Championships: 0
- Race victories: 4

Buckshot Racing is a former NASCAR team owned by Billy Jones and competed in the Winston Cup and Busch Series. The team compiled a total of four wins throughout its history.

The team debuted in 1995 with Jones' son Buckshot driving. Jones made his debut at The Milwaukee Mile with Longhorn Steakhouse sponsorship. Jones ran a total of nine races that season, finishing ninth at South Boston Speedway. The following season, they ran a total of eighteen races with Aquafresh sponsoring. Jones won his first career race at Milwaukee and a pole at North Carolina Speedway, finishing 25th in the final points. He failed to win another race in 1997, but he finished a career-best seventh in points, and made his Winston Cup debut at Atlanta Motor Speedway. The team qualified 32nd but finished last due to a wreck by Jones early in the race.

In 1998, Bayer/Alka-Seltzer became the team's new primary sponsor, and Jones picked up his second career win at the Gumout Long Life Formula 200, but dropped to ninth in points. Buckshot Racing also ran five Cup races under a partnership with Stavola Brothers Racing, and had an eighth-place finish at Dover International Speedway. Jones moved up to Winston Cup full-time in 1999, racing the 00 but without major sponsorship. Larry Pearson replaced him in the team's Busch Series operation, with Cheez-It sponsorship. Jones struggled running the Cup series, and after several DNQs, he left Cup to replace Pearson in the Busch car. Pearson had only one top-ten finish. Jones had two tenth-place finishes out of nineteen starts. In 2000, Jones won his final pole at Michigan International Speedway and improved to 21st in the standings.

Jones returned to Cup for Petty Enterprises in 2001, and Todd Bodine was hired as the team's new driver. Despite driving without major sponsorship and switching to Chevrolet, Bodine won two of the first three races of the season. When sponsorship forced the team to cut back to a part-time schedule, Buckshot and Tim Fedewa returned to drive a limited races with Georgia Pacific funding, posting four top-ten finishes between them. Jason Schuler also drove the No. 04 for a pair of races, his best finishes of 36th. The lack of funding caused Buckshot to sell the team in 2002.

== Winston Cup ==
=== Car No. 00 results ===
Year	Driver	No.	Make	1	2	3	4	5	6	7	8	9	10	11	12	13	14	15	16	17	18	19	20	21	22	23	24	25	26	27	28	29	30	31	32	33	34	NWCC	Pts
1997	Buckshot Jones	00	Pontiac	DAY	CAR	RCH	ATL	DAR	TEX	BRI	MAR	SON	TAL	CLT	DOV	POC	MCH	CAL	DAY	NHA	POC	IND	GLN	MCH	BRI	DAR	RCH	NHA	DOV	MAR	CLT	TAL	CAR	PHO	ATL; 43			64th	34
1998	Buckshot Jones	00	Pontiac	DAY	CAR	LVS	ATL	DAR	BRI	TEX	MAR	TAL	CAL	CLT	DOV	RCH	MCH	POC; DNQ	SON	NHA	POC	IND	GLN	MCH	BRI	NHA	DAR	RCH	DOV	MAR	CLT	TAL	DAY	PHO	CAR	ATL		47th	406
1999	Buckshot Jones	00	Pontiac	DAY; DNQ	CAR; DNQ	LVS; 29	ATL; 37	DAR; 34	TEX; 35	BRI; 39	MAR; DNQ	TAL; 21	CAL; DNQ	RCH; DNQ	CLT; 29	DOV; DNQ	MCH; DNQ	POC	SON	DAY; 41	NHA	POC	IND; DNQ	GLN	MCH	BRI	DAR	RCH	NHA	DOV	MAR	CLT	TAL	CAR	PHO	HOM	ATL; 26	47th	779
2000	Buckshot Jones	00	Pontiac	DAY	CAR	LVS	ATL	DAR	BRI	TEX	MAR	TAL	CAL	RCH	CLT	DOV	MCH	POC	SON	DAY	NHA	POC	IND	GLN	MCH	BRI	DAR	RCH	NHA	DOV	MAR	CLT	TAL	CAR	PHO	HOM	ATL; 37	59th	52

== Busch Series ==
=== Car No. 00 results ===
Year	Driver	No.	Make	1	2	3	4	5	6	7	8	9	10	11	12	13	14	15	16	17	18	19	20	21	22	23	24	25	26	27	28	29	30	31	32	33	NBSC	Pts
1995	Buckshot Jones	00	Ford	DAY	CAR	RCH; DNQ	ATL	NSV	DAR	BRI	HCY	NHA	NZH	CLT	DOV	MYB; DNQ	GLN	MLW; 34	TAL	SBO; 9	IRP; 29	MCH; 16	BRI; 23		RCH; 12	DOV; 11	CLT; DNQ	CAR	HOM; 37									
1995	Buckshot Jones	00	Chevy																					DAR; 41														
1996	Buckshot Jones	00	Ford	DAY; DNQ	CAR; 37	RCH; 19	ATL; 18	NSV; DNQ	DAR; DNQ	BRI; DNQ	HCY; 24	NZH; 21	CLT; DNQ	DOV; 21	SBO; 23	MYB; 13	GLN; 29	MLW; 1	NHA; 21	TAL; DNQ	IRP; 9	MCH; 27	BRI; 24	DAR; 34	RCH; 33	DOV; 19	CLT; 27		HOM; DNQ									
1996	Buckshot Jones	00	Pontiac																									CAR; 37										
1997	Buckshot Jones	00	Pontiac	DAY; 12	CAR; 13	RCH; 13	ATL; 4	LVS; 39	DAR; 6	HCY; 14	TEX; 7	BRI; 10	NSV; 10	TAL; 38	NHA; 41	NZH; 9	CLT; 6	DOV; 17	SBO; 3	GLN; 20	MLW; 4	MYB; 10	GTY; 25	IRP; 7	MCH; 5	BRI; 26	DAR; 32	RCH; 6	DOV; 23		CAL; 40	CAR; 15	HOM; 26				7th	3487
1997	Buckshot Jones	00	Ford																											CLT; 10							7th	3487
1998	Buckshot Jones	00	Pontiac	DAY; 4	CAR; 15	LVS; 8	NSV; 13	DAR; 14	BRI; 28*	TEX; 28	HCY; 12	TAL; 4	NHA; 1	NZH; 33	CLT; 29	DOV; 19	RCH; 30	PPR; 18	GLN; 29	MLW; 7	MYB; 15	CAL; 11	SBO; 17	IRP; 3	MCH; 14	BRI; 8	DAR; 42	RCH; 36	DOV; 41	CLT; 5	GTY; 31	CAR; 35	ATL; 5	HOM; 16			11th	3453
1999	Larry Pearson	00	Pontiac	DAY; 25	CAR; 13	LVS; DNQ	ATL; 20	DAR; 23	TEX; 30		BRI; 30	TAL; 7	CAL; 27		RCH; 25	NZH; 30	CLT; DNQ		SBO; 25																		16th	2935
1999	Buckshot Jones	00	Pontiac							NSV; 12				NHA; 16				DOV; 22		GLN; 19	MLW; 16	MYB; 23	PPR; 39	GTY; 40	IRP; 33	MCH; 11	BRI; 35	DAR; 11	RCH; 26	DOV; 10	CLT; 11	CAR; 18	MEM; 36	PHO; 10	HOM; 17		16th	2935
2000	Buckshot Jones	00	Pontiac	DAY; 8	CAR; 38	LVS; 24	ATL; 36	DAR; 25	BRI; 34	TEX; 26	NSV; 38	TAL; 2							MYB; 31	GLN; 20																	22nd	2952
2000	Buckshot Jones	00	Chevy										CAL; 23	RCH; 26	NHA; 19	CLT; 17	DOV; 23	SBO; 33			MLW; 40	NZH; 25	PPR; 19	GTY; 20	IRP; 29	MCH; 40	BRI; 27	DAR; 20	RCH; 26	DOV; 6	CLT; 26	CAR; 17	MEM; 11	PHO; 25	HOM; 16		22nd	2952
2001	Todd Bodine	00	Pontiac	DAY; 38								TAL; 4																									26th	2804
2001	Todd Bodine	00	Chevy		CAR; 1*	LVS; 1*	ATL; 5	DAR; 34	BRI; 19	TEX; 35	NSH; 10		CAL; 17	RCH; 35	NHA	NZH	CLT; 4																				26th	2804
2001	Buckshot Jones	00	Chevy															DOV; 18				CHI; 7									KAN; 8	CLT; 13	MEM	PHO	CAR; 19	HOM; 18	26th	2804
2001	Tim Fedewa	00	Chevy																KEN; 36	MLW; 31			GTY; 40	PPR; 10	IRP; 7	MCH; 9	BRI; 41	DAR	RCH	DOV							26th	2804
2001	Tom Hubert	00	Pontiac																		GLN; 28																26th	2804

=== Car No. 04 results ===
Year	Driver	No.	Make	1	2	3	4	5	6	7	8	9	10	11	12	13	14	15	16	17	18	19	20	21	22	23	24	25	26	27	28	29	30	31	32	33	NBSC	Pts
2001	Jason Schuler	04	Chevy	DAY	CAR	LVS	ATL	DAR	BRI	TEX	NSH	TAL	CAL	RCH	NHA	NZH	CLT	DOV	KEN	MLW	GLN	CHI	GTY; 41	PPR; 36	IRP	MCH	BRI	DAR	RCH	DOV	KAN	CLT	MEM	PHO	CAR	HOM	77th	95
