= Geoff Bodine Racing =

Former NASCAR team

- Owner(s): Geoff Bodine, Jim Mattei, John Porter
- Base: Mooresville, North Carolina
- Series: Winston Cup, Craftsman Truck Series
- Race drivers: Geoff Bodine, Tammy Jo Kirk, Dave Rezendes, Barry Bodine
- Manufacturer: Ford
- Opened: 1993
- Closed: 2000

Career
- Drivers' Championships: 0
- Race victories: 7

Geoff Bodine Racing (also known as GEB Racing) was a NASCAR Winston Cup and Craftsman Truck Series team. It was owned and operated by former NASCAR driver Geoffrey Bodine following his purchase of the estate of Alan Kulwicki. He remained owner of the team until the 1998 season, when he sold the operation to Jim Mattei and John Porter. Through the chain of succession, the team's final owner was Robby Gordon.

== Winston Cup ==
In 1993, Bodine, who was driving for Bud Moore Engineering at the time, decided to become an owner-driver. Earlier in the season, then-defending Winston Cup Champion Alan Kulwicki, who owned and drove for AK Racing, was killed in a plane crash as the Cup Series made its spring trip to Bristol.

Bodine was able to raise enough money to purchase the assets of Kulwicki’s former team from its caretaker, Felix Sabates, who had been providing financial backing so the team could continue running. However, he immediately ran into a problem as Kulwicki’s sponsor, Hooters, pulled out of the team immediately after Bodine took ownership. Undaunted, Bodine signed The Family Channel to be the sponsor for the remainder of the season. After The Family Channel moved over to Roush Racing for the next year, Bodine got Exide Batteries to sponsor his effort in 1994. Bodine won three times that year but finished 17th in points. He also won the 1994 Winston Select. He almost won the inaugural running of the Brickyard 400 before he got into a controversial incident with younger brother Brett Bodine where Brett wrecked Geoff out of the lead; Geoff responded by publicly announcing to the press that he and Brett were feuding in their personal lives. Two weeks later, Geoff's wife moved out of the house and filed for divorce, resulting in a downward spiral for Bodine. Later that year, Geoff won at North Wilkesboro which was the last time the race winner lapped the entire field. Bodine improved one spot better in 1995, although he struggled in several races and went winless. Bodine would later publicly admit that his ongoing divorce was impacting his ability to drive competitively and made several changes to the racing operations.

In 1996, after Exide moved to Roush, Bodine ran with QVC sponsorship and scored his final win at Watkins Glen International Raceway. He struggled in 1997, failing to qualify in a couple of races, and having his brother Todd fill in for him at the Coca-Cola 600. Despite this, he won two poles in the last two months of the season, including one that broke the track record at Atlanta Motor Speedway.

In 1998, he sold part of his ownership to Mattei and Porter, and picked up sponsorship from Philips. When Bodine got an offer to drive for Joe Bessey in 1999, he sold the rest of his team and was replaced by Michael Waltrip, as the team switched to Chevrolet. Finishing fifth in the Daytona 500, Waltrip finished the year 29th in points. Getting sponsorship from NationsRent in 2000, Waltrip's only top-ten finish that year was a third at Martinsville. He left at the end of the year for Dale Earnhardt, Inc. and Mike Wallace took over, while the team switched back to Ford. During the 2000 season, the team was sold to Ultra Motorsports.

=== Car No. 7 results ===
Year	Driver	No.	Make	1	2	3	4	5	6	7	8	9	10	11	12	13	14	15	16	17	18	19	20	21	22	23	24	25	26	27	28	29	30	31	32	33	34	Owners	Pts
1993	Geoff Bodine	7	Ford	DAY	CAR	RCH	ATL	DAR	BRI	NWS	MAR	TAL	SON	CLT	DOV	POC	MCH	DAY	NHA	POC	TAL	GLN	MCH	BRI	DAR	RCH	DOV; 30	MAR; 14	NWS; 31	CLT; 13	CAR; 10	PHO; 43	ATL; 39						
1994	Geoff Bodine	7	Ford	DAY; 11	CAR; 15	RCH; 32	ATL; 38	DAR; 40	BRI; 4	NWS; 7	MAR; 34	TAL; 41	SON; 2	CLT; 3	DOV; 41	POC; 19	MCH; 28	DAY; 6	NHA; 31	POC; 1*	TAL; 33	IND; 39	GLN; 29	MCH; 1*	BRI; 23*	DAR; 27	RCH; 18	DOV; 5*	MAR; 18	NWS; 1*	CLT; 32*	CAR; 40	PHO; 8	ATL; 34					
1995	Geoff Bodine	7	Ford	DAY; 20	CAR; 21	RCH; 11	ATL; 30	DAR; 13	BRI; 23	NWS; 14	MAR; 35	TAL; 7	SON; 22	CLT; 26	DOV; 27	POC; 14	MCH; 21	DAY; 14	NHA; 35	POC; 6	TAL; 24	IND; 15	GLN; 9	MCH; 27	BRI; 12	DAR; 35	RCH; 19	DOV; 24	MAR; 5	NWS; 11	CLT; 16	CAR; 15	PHO; 16	ATL; 11					
1996	Geoff Bodine	7	Ford	DAY; 34	CAR; 39	RCH; 33	ATL; 23	DAR; 22	BRI; 19	NWS; 19	MAR; 27	TAL; 26	SON; 40	CLT; 10	DOV; 30	POC; 3	MCH; 21	DAY; 34	NHA; 15	POC; 11	TAL; 6	IND; 20	GLN; 1	MCH; 12	BRI; 39	DAR; 21	RCH; 17	DOV; 11	MAR; 7	NWS; 30	CLT; 20	CAR; 15	PHO; 6	ATL; 26					
1997	Geoff Bodine	7	Ford	DAY; 34	CAR; 8	RCH; 2	ATL; 20	DAR; 9	TEX; 14	BRI; 33	MAR; 29	SON; 44	TAL; 43		DOV; 42	POC; 8	MCH; 40	CAL; 35	DAY; DNQ	NHA; 10	POC; 17	IND; DNQ	GLN; 2	MCH; 11	BRI; 9	DAR; 12	RCH; 4	NHA; 16	DOV; 14	MAR; 28	CLT; 43	TAL; 8	CAR; 19	PHO; 10	ATL; 33				
1997	Todd Bodine	7	Ford											CLT; 42																									
1998	Geoff Bodine	7	Ford	DAY; 31	CAR; 5	LVS; 13	ATL; 22	DAR; 41	BRI; 39	TEX; 32	MAR; 35	TAL; DNQ	CAL; 7	CLT; 23	DOV; 23	RCH; 28	MCH; 23	POC; 40	SON; 35	NHA; 37	POC; 14	IND; 37	GLN; 32	MCH; 21	BRI; 30	NHA; 23	DAR; 9	RCH; 13	DOV; 14	MAR; 39	CLT; 9	TAL; 25	DAY; 41	PHO; 34	CAR; 11	ATL; 10			
1999	Michael Waltrip	7	Chevy	DAY; 5	CAR; 20	LVS; 22	ATL; 10	DAR; 21	TEX; 14	BRI; 12	MAR; 39	TAL; 18	CAL; 23	RCH; 22	CLT; 37	DOV; 42	MCH; 15	POC; 37	SON; 10	DAY; 39	NHA; 19	POC; 12	IND; 27	GLN; 21	MCH; 13	BRI; 37	DAR; 41	RCH; 38	NHA; 38	DOV; 19	MAR; 33	CLT; 14	TAL; 39	CAR; 27	PHO; 33	HOM; 36	ATL; 36		
2000	Michael Waltrip	7	Chevy	DAY; 39	CAR; 23	LVS; 33	ATL; 25	DAR; 32	BRI; 11	TEX; 29	MAR; 3	TAL; 31	CAL; 30	RCH; 19	CLT; 18	DOV; 39	MCH	POC	SON	DAY	NHA	POC	IND	GLN	MCH	BRI	DAR	RCH	NHA	DOV	MAR	CLT	TAL	CAR	PHO	HOM	ATL		

== Craftsman Truck Series ==
Bodine Racing began racing in the new Truck Series in 1995, when Bodine drove ten races in the No. 7, with Exide sponsorship. He shared the ride with Dave Rezendes, who raced eleven times that season; together, they combined for fourteen top-ten finishes. Bodine's son Barry drove the No. 07 Tanya Tucker Salsa truck at Martinsville, but he crashed out. Rezendes raced the No. 7 full-time in 1996 NASCAR Craftsman Truck Series with QVC sponsoring, and he responded with three victories and a sixth-place finish in points. Bodine and Barry drove the 07 in six races, but only had one pole and top-ten.

Due to a lack of sponsorship, Rezendes was let go after two races in 1997. Tammy Jo Kirk took his place with Loveable sponsorship, becoming the first full-time female driver on the circuit. She had a best finish of 11th, but was let go late in the season, and Barry Bodine finished out the season. The team closed in 1998 due to a lack of sponsorship.

=== Truck No. 7 results ===
Year	Driver	No.	Make	1	2	3	4	5	6	7	8	9	10	11	12	13	14	15	16	17	18	19	20	21	22	23	24	25	26	27	Owners	Pts
1995	Geoff Bodine	7	Ford	PHO; 5		SGS; 2		POR; 6				BRI; 2				IRP; 25		RCH; 2*	MAR; 15	NWS; 3*		MMR; 26	PHO; 3									
1995	Dave Rezendes	7	Ford		TUS; 10		MMR; 19		EVG; 7	I70; 2	LVL; 15		MLW; 8	CNS; 5	HPT; 26		FLM; 9				SON; 9											
1996	Dave Rezendes	7	Ford	HOM; 1	PHO; 22	POR; 32	EVG; 11	TUS; 8	CNS; 5	HPT; 9	BRI; 2	NZH; 12	MLW; 8	LVL; 4	I70; 9	IRP; 16	FLM; 4	GLN; 23	NSV; 1	RCH; 11	NHA; 23	MAR; 12	NWS; 32	SON; 1*	MMR; 10	PHO; 22	LVS; 5					
1997	Dave Rezendes	7	Ford	WDW; 14	TUS; 10																											
1997	Tammy Jo Kirk	7	Ford			HOM; 23	PHO; 12	POR; 14	EVG; 16	I70; 25	NHA; 13	TEX; 13	BRI; 19	NZH; 16	MLW; 16	LVL; 14	CNS; 17	HPT; 11	IRP; 34	FLM; 19												
1997	Barry Bodine	7	Ford																		NSV; 20	GLN	RCH; 25	MAR; 17	SON	MMR	CAL; 12	PHO; 16	LVS; 34			
1998	Barry Bodine	7	Ford	WDW; 35	HOM	PHO	POR	EVG	I70	GLN	TEX	BRI	MLW	NZH	CAL	PPR	IRP	NHA	FLM	NSV	HPT	LVL	RCH	MEM	GTY	MAR	SON	MMR	PHO	LVS		

=== Truck No. 07 results ===
Year	Driver	No.	Make	1	2	3	4	5	6	7	8	9	10	11	12	13	14	15	16	17	18	19	20	21	22	23	24	25	26	Owners	Pts
1995	Barry Bodine	07	Ford	PHO	TUS	SGS	MMR	POR	EVG	I70	LVL	BRI	MLW	CNS	HPT	IRP	FLM	RCH	MAR; 30	NWS	SON	MMR									
1995	Dave Rezendes	07	Ford																				PHO; 14								
1996	Geoff Bodine	07	Ford	HOM; 33	PHO	POR	EVG	TUS	CNS	HPT	BRI	NZH; 8	MLW	LVL	I70	IRP	FLM	GLN; 17	NSV	RCH	NHA						LVS; 39				
1996	Barry Bodine	07	Ford																			MAR; 20	NWS; 23	SON	MMR	PHO					
1997	Tammy Jo Kirk	07	Ford	WDW; 24	TUS; DNQ																NSV; 14	GLN	RCH	MAR	SON	MMR	CAL	PHO	LVS		
1997	Barry Bodine	07	Ford			HOM; 27	PHO	POR	EVG	I70	NHA	TEX	BRI	NZH	MLW	LVL	CNS	HPT	IRP	FLM											
