= Roehrig Motorsports =

Former US auto racing team

- Owner: Kurt Roehrig
- Series: Winston Cup Series; Craftsman Truck Series
- Manufacturer: Chevrolet; Ford; Dodge; Pontiac
- Opened: 1995
- Closed: 2000

Career
- Debut: 1995 Skoal Bandit Copper World Classic (Phoenix)
- Latest race: 1999 Save Mart/Kragen 350 (Sonoma)
- Races competed: 96
- Drivers' Championships: 0
- Race victories: 4 (Truck Series)
- Pole positions: 3

Roehrig Motorsports is a former auto racing team that competed part-time in the NASCAR Winston Cup and full-time in the Craftsman Truck Series from 1995 to 1999. It was owned by longtime automotive engineer Kurt Roehrig and his wife Carmela. In 1999 and 2000, the team entered a partnership with track star Jackie Joyner-Kersee and her husband to field a Winston Cup team in a venture called Joyner-Kersee-Roehrig Motorsports.

== Winston Cup Series ==
Roehrig Motorsports entered Winston Cup competition at the inaugural 1998 Las Vegas 400, entering the #19 Yellow Freight Ford Thunderbird with Tony Raines driving, but did not qualify. The combination made two more attempts at California Speedway and Michigan International Speedway but also failed to qualify for both events. Roehrig Motorsports made its official race debut at the Save Mart/Kragen 350 at Sears Point Raceway with team shop foreman Tom Hubert driving and Bradford White sponsoring. They qualified tenth but finished forty-first after dropping out with transmission issues after seventy-eight laps. Following this race, Roehrig made two more Cup attempts with Yellow Freight sponsorship, with Robby Gordon at the Brickyard 400 and with Raines at Michigan, but failed to qualify for both events.

Roehrig returned to Cup competition in 1999 at the Las Vegas 400 with Hubert and Bradford White, qualifying fourth but finishing twenty-eighth, five laps down. Their next appearance came at Sonoma, this time fielding a Pontiac Grand Prix for Hubert, starting thirtieth and finishing thirty-third. At the next road course race at the 1999 Frontier @ the Glen, the team leased the #19 to Paul Gentilozzi after he wrecked the #92 Homelink Ford he originally planned to enter, but the effort did not qualify. Roehrig made his final Cup attempt of 1999 with Hubert the following week but Michigan, but failed to qualify.

Late in 1999, Roehrig formed a partnership with trainer Bob Kersee and his wife Jackie Joyner-Kersee to field a Winston Cup team for the 2000 season. The effort, known as Joyner-Kersee-Roehrig Motorsports, made its only appearance at the 2000 Bud Shootout, running the #34 Chevrolet with David Green driving and Kendall Motor Oil and Sunoco sponsoring, finishing twelfth. Green and the team were entered in the 2000 Daytona 500 but withdrew their entry after time trials, and after the team was unable to find sponsorship, did not make an appearance in Winston Cup again.

=== Car No. 19 Results ===
Year	Driver	No.	Make	1	2	3	4	5	6	7	8	9	10	11	12	13	14	15	16	17	18	19	20	21	22	23	24	25	26	27	28	29	30	31	32	33	34	NWCS	Pts
1998	Tony Raines	19	Ford	DAY	CAR	LVS; DNQ	ATL	DAR	BRI	TEX	MAR	TAL	CAL; DNQ	CLT	DOV	RCH	MCH; DNQ	POC													CLT; DNQ	TAL	DAY	PHO	CAR	ATL		53rd	152
1998	Tom Hubert	19	Ford																SON; 41	NHA	POC																	53rd	152
1998	Robby Gordon	19	Ford																			IND; DNQ	GLN	MCH	BRI	NHA	DAR	RCH	DOV	MAR	CLT	TAL	DAY	PHO	CAR	ATL		53rd	152
1999	Tom Hubert	19	Ford	DAY	CAR	LVS; 28	ATL	DAR	TEX	BRI	MAR	TAL	CAL	RCH	CLT	DOV	MCH	POC																				53rd	187
1999	Tom Hubert	19	Pontiac																SON; 33	DAY	NHA	POC	IND		MCH; DNQ	BRI	DAR	RCH	NHA	DOV	MAR	CLT	TAL	CAR	PHO	HOM	ATL	53rd	187
1999	Paul Gentilozzi	19	Pontiac																					GLN; DNQ														53rd	187
2000	David Green	34	Chevy	DAY; Wth	CAR	LVS	ATL	DAR	BRI	TEX	MAR	TAL	CAL	RCH	CLT	DOV	MCH	POC	SON	DAY	NHA	POC	IND	GLN	MCH	BRI	DAR	RCH	NHA	DOV	MAR	CLT	TAL	CAR	PHO	HOM	ATL	N/A	-

== Craftsman Truck Series ==
=== Truck No. 18 History ===
Roehrig Motorsports debuted in the inaugural Craftsman Truck Series race, the 1995 Copper World Classic. Johnny Benson qualified the #18 Hella Lights/Performance Friction Chevrolet C/K fourth and finished tenth. Benson made six more starts that season with Performance Friction sponsorship, his best being a second at Indianapolis Raceway Park. Wally Dallenbach Jr. and Davy Jones made starts at Sonoma and Heartland Park Topeka, respectively, with Dallenbach finishing second in his lone start. Roehrig made another attempt at a part-time schedule with the #18 in 1996, starting with Benson who brought along Pennzoil sponsorship and finished in the top ten in all four of his starts, winning one pole. Along with Benson, David Green, Steve Park, and Robby Gordon all made a series of one-off starts in the truck, with Park and Gordon each earning a top-ten finish.

In 1997. Roehrig attempted a full-time schedule in the #18 with Michael Dokken driving with sponsorship from Dana Corporation. Despite a pole position early in the season and two top-five finishes, Dokken struggled with consistency and was released midway through the season. He was replaced with a rotation of replacement drivers including Tom Hubert, Kevin Cywinski, Ted Christopher, and Jerry Marquis along with Benson and Gordon. Hubert recorded the highest finish of the year with a 2nd place finish at Sonoma Raceway. The #18 team did not return for 1998.

==== Truck No. 18 results ====
Year	Driver	No.	Make	1	2	3	4	5	6	7	8	9	10	11	12	13	14	15	16	17	18	19	20	21	22	23	24	25	26	NCTC	Pts
1995	Johnny Benson Jr.	18	Chevy	PHO; 10	TUS	SGS	MMR	POR	EVG	I70	LVL	BRI	MLW; 7	CNS		IRP; 2	FLM	RCH; 11	MAR; 3	NWS; DNQ		MMR; 10	PHO; 17								
1995	Davy Jones	18	Chevy												HPT; 28																
1995	Wally Dallenbach Jr.	18	Chevy																		SON; 2										
1996	Johnny Benson Jr.	18	Chevy	HOM	PHO	POR	EVG	TUS	CNS	HPT; 6	BRI	NZH; 6	MLW	LVL	I70								NWS; 7	SON	MMR	PHO; 2					
1996	David Green	18	Chevy													IRP; 34	FLM	GLN	NSV	RCH											
1996	Steve Park	18	Chevy																		NHA; 4										
1996	Michael Dokken	18	Chevy																			MAR; 15									
1996	Robby Gordon	18	Chevy																								LVS; 6				
1997	Michael Dokken	18	Chevy	WDW; 35																											
1997	Michael Dokken	18	Dodge		TUS; 13*	HOM; 35	PHO; 28	POR; 29	EVG; 3	I70; 26	NHA; 31	TEX; 24	BRI; 23	NZH; 5	MLW; 32	LVL; 17				FLM; 22											
1997	Tom Hubert	18	Dodge														CNS; 23	HPT; 31			NSV; 28				SON; 2			PHO; 11			
1997	Kevin Cywinski	18	Dodge																IRP; 20							MMR; 15			LVS; DNQ		
1997	Ted Christopher	18	Dodge																			GLN; 7									
1997	Jerry Marquis	18	Dodge																				RCH; 28								
1997	Johnny Benson Jr.	18	Dodge																					MAR; 34							
1997	Robby Gordon	18	Dodge																								CAL; 30				

=== Truck No. 19 History ===
Roehrig Motorsports debuted the #19 Dodge Ram in 1997 with rookie Tony Raines and sponsorship from Pennzoil. After failing to qualify for two of the first four races, Raines won his first career race at I-70 Speedway and had seven top-ten finishes, ending the season fifteenth in the championship standings and third in the Rookie of the Year competition. The team switched to Ford in 1998, and Raines won three additional races and finished a career-best fifth in points. Following the team's decision to focus on its Winston Cup operation, the Craftsman Truck team closed its doors.

==== Truck No. 19 results ====
Year	Driver	No.	Make	1	2	3	4	5	6	7	8	9	10	11	12	13	14	15	16	17	18	19	20	21	22	23	24	25	26	27	NCTC	Pts
1997	Tony Raines	19	Dodge	WDW; DNQ	TUS; 15	HOM; 30	PHO; DNQ	POR; 7	EVG; 18	I70; 1^{*}	NHA; 34	TEX; 32	BRI; 22	NZH; 10	MLW; 7	LVL; 4	CNS; 9	HPT; 10	IRP; 27	FLM; 16	NSV; 11	GLN; 33	RCH; 22	MAR; 23	SON; 24	MMR; 11	CAL; 13	PHO; 36	LVS; 11			
1998	Tony Raines	19	Ford	WDW; 16	HOM; 25	PHO; 9	POR; 5	EVG; 18	I70; 1^{*}	GLN; 12	TEX; 1	BRI; 6	MLW; 15	NZH; 7	CAL; 17	PPR; 2	IRP; 4	NHA; 5	FLM; 17	NSV; 2	HPT; 14	LVL; 1	RCH; 28	MEM; 25	GTY; 32	MAR; 7	SON; 3	MMR; 10	PHO; 10	LVS; 22		
