= Tim Beverley =

American racing driver

Timothy J. Beverley (born 1956) is a former NASCAR team owner. Beverley was one of the founders of Tyler Jet, L.L.C., an aircraft sales and refurbishing company based in Tyler, Texas. In 1998, he purchased DarWal Inc. and ISM Racing and merged them together to form Tyler Jet Motorsports. He fielded cars for Darrell Waltrip, Rich Bickle, David Green and Johnny Benson. In 2000, he sold the team to MB2 Motorsports.

Beverley started Tyler Jet L.L.C. in 1986. Tyler Jet was a thriving business that bought, sold and repaired aircraft, operated an FBO and ran a business aircraft interior completions and refurbishment center. In February 2002 Tyler Jet creditors forced the company to file Chapter 7 bankruptcy, which Beverley later amended in court to Chapter 11 bankruptcy. In 2004, Beverley, who was then Tyler Jet president and chief executive officer, was sentenced to six years in prison, and the company's Chief Financial Officer Gregory A. Hopper was sentenced to three and one-half years in prison for their part in a money laundering scheme that cost businesses and banks $18 million. They were each ordered to pay $18.2 million in restitution.

While Beverley was on supervised release stemming from his federal conviction for money laundering, he worked as an airplane broker at Majestic Jet Inc., a company in Pompano Beach Florida that provided aircraft charters. From 2010 through 2013, Beverley stole more than $1.5 million from Majestic Jet by directing airplane escrow agents to wire funds from the sale of planes to nominee bank accounts that Beverley controlled. Beverley also stole funds directly from Majestic's business bank accounts and used the money to pay for personal expenses including his boat and rent. Beverley did not report this income on his 2010 through 2013 personal tax returns. On October 17, 2017 federal jury convicted Beverly of filing fraudulent tax returns, wire fraud and filing false monthly reports with the U.S. Probation Office.

On Friday, March 16, 2018 Beverly was sentenced to 90 months in prison for filing fraudulent tax returns, wire fraud, and filing false monthly reports with the U.S. Probation Office
