= 2000 Daytona 500 =

First race of the 2000 NASCAR Winston Cup Series

Race details
- Race 1 of 34 in the 2000 NASCAR Winston Cup Series
- The 2000 Daytona 500 logo.
- Date: February 20, 2000
- Official name: 42nd Annual Daytona 500
- Location: Daytona Beach, Florida, Daytona International Speedway
- Course: Permanent racing facility
- Course length: 2.5 miles (4.0 km)
- Distance: 200 laps, 500 mi (804.672 km)
- Average speed: 154.972 miles per hour (249.403 km/h)
- Attendance: 200,000

Pole position
Driver	Dale Jarrett	Robert Yates Racing
- Time: 47.098

Most laps led
Driver	Dale Jarrett	Robert Yates Racing
- Laps: 89

Winner
No. 88	Dale Jarrett	Robert Yates Racing

Television in the United States
- Network: CBS
- Announcers: Mike Joy, Buddy Baker, Ned Jarrett

Radio in the United States
- Radio: Motor Racing Network

The 2000 Daytona 500 was the first stock car race of the 2000 NASCAR Winston Cup Series, the first of five No Bull 5 races, and the 42nd iteration of the event. The race was held on Sunday, February 20, 2000, before an audience of 200,000 in Daytona Beach, Florida at Daytona International Speedway, a 2.5 miles (4.0 km) permanent triangular-shaped superspeedway. The race took the scheduled 200 laps to complete.

In the final laps of the race, Robert Yates Racing's Dale Jarrett engaged in a battle for the lead against Tyler Jet Motorsports' Johnny Benson Jr. With four laps left in the race, Jarrett was able to pass Benson, retaining the lead until a caution came out with two laps left in the race for Jimmy Spencer. As the race ended under caution, Jarrett was the declared the winner at race's end. The victory was Jarrett's 23rd career NASCAR Winston Cup Series victory, his first victory of the season, and his third and final Daytona 500 victory. To fill out the top three, Roush Racing's Jeff Burton and owner-driver Bill Elliott finished second and third, respectively.

== Background ==
The layout of Daytona International Speedway, the venue where the race was held.

The 2000 Daytona 500 program cover, featuring Jeff Gordon.

Daytona International Speedway is one of three superspeedways to hold NASCAR races, the other two being Indianapolis Motor Speedway and Talladega Superspeedway. The standard track at Daytona International Speedway is a four-turn superspeedway that is 2.5 miles (4.0 km) long. The track's turns are banked at 31 degrees, while the front stretch, the location of the finish line, is banked at 18 degrees.

After years of complaints over suspension issues first exposed after two fatal crashes in 1994 regarding overaggressive shock and spring setups, and exposed at the 1998 Firecracker 400 through cars "bottoming out" producing sparks as the suspension pieces rubbed the pavement, NASCAR decided for the "restrictor plate" races to implement standardised shocks and springs.

=== Entry list ===
- (R) denotes rookie driver.
- (W) denotes past winner of the Daytona 500.

#	Driver	Team	Make
1	Steve Park	Dale Earnhardt, Inc.	Chevrolet
2	Rusty Wallace	Penske-Kranefuss Racing	Ford
3	Dale Earnhardt (W)	Richard Childress Racing	Chevrolet
4	Bobby Hamilton	Morgan–McClure Motorsports	Chevrolet
5	Terry Labonte	Hendrick Motorsports	Chevrolet
6	Mark Martin	Roush Racing	Ford
7	Michael Waltrip	Mattei Motorsports	Chevrolet
8	Dale Earnhardt Jr. (R)	Dale Earnhardt, Inc.	Chevrolet
9	Stacy Compton (R)	Melling Racing	Ford
10	Johnny Benson Jr.	Tyler Jet Motorsports	Pontiac
11	Brett Bodine	Brett Bodine Racing	Ford
12	Jeremy Mayfield	Penske-Kranefuss Racing	Ford
13	Robby Gordon	Team Menard	Ford
14	Mike Bliss (R)	A. J. Foyt Enterprises	Pontiac
15	Derrike Cope (W)	Fenley-Moore Motorsports	Ford
16	Kevin Lepage	Roush Racing	Ford
17	Matt Kenseth (R)	Roush Racing	Ford
18	Bobby Labonte	Joe Gibbs Racing	Pontiac
20	Tony Stewart	Joe Gibbs Racing	Pontiac
21	Elliott Sadler	Wood Brothers Racing	Ford
22	Ward Burton	Bill Davis Racing	Pontiac
24	Jeff Gordon (W)	Hendrick Motorsports	Chevrolet
25	Jerry Nadeau	Hendrick Motorsports	Chevrolet
26	Jimmy Spencer	Haas-Carter Motorsports	Ford
27	Jeff Fuller	Eel River Racing	Pontiac
28	Ricky Rudd	Robert Yates Racing	Ford
31	Mike Skinner	Richard Childress Racing	Chevrolet
32	Scott Pruett (R)	PPI Motorsports	Ford
33	Joe Nemechek	Andy Petree Racing	Chevrolet
34	David Green (Note: The team withdrew after a poor performance in the Budweiser Shootout.)	JKR Motorsports	Chevrolet
36	Ken Schrader	MB2 Motorsports	Pontiac
40	Sterling Marlin (W)	Team SABCO	Chevrolet
41	Rick Mast	Larry Hedrick Motorsports	Chevrolet
42	Kenny Irwin Jr.	Team SABCO	Chevrolet
43	John Andretti	Petty Enterprises	Pontiac
44	Kyle Petty	Petty Enterprises	Pontiac
48	Stanton Barrett	TriStar Motorsports	Ford
50	Ricky Craven	Midwest Transit Racing	Chevrolet
55	Kenny Wallace	Andy Petree Racing	Chevrolet
60	Ted Musgrave	Joe Bessey Racing	Chevrolet
65	Dan Pardus	Jim & Judie Motorsports	Chevrolet
66	Darrell Waltrip (W)	Haas-Carter Motorsports	Ford
71	Dave Marcis	Marcis Auto Racing	Chevrolet
72	Jim Sauter	Marcis Auto Racing	Chevrolet
75	Wally Dallenbach Jr.	Galaxy Motorsports	Ford
77	Robert Pressley	Jasper Motorsports	Ford
84	Norm Benning	Norm Benning Racing	Chevrolet
85	Carl Long	Mansion Motorsports	Ford
88	Dale Jarrett (W)	Robert Yates Racing	Ford
89	Bobby Gerhart	Bobby Gerhart Racing	Chevrolet
90	Ed Berrier (R)	Donlavey Racing	Ford
91	Andy Hillenburg	LJ Racing	Chevrolet
93	Dave Blaney (R)	Bill Davis Racing	Pontiac
94	Bill Elliott (W)	Bill Elliott Racing	Ford
96	Greg Sacks	Petty–Huggins Motorsports	Chevrolet
97	Chad Little	Roush Racing	Ford
99	Jeff Burton	Roush Racing	Ford

== Practice ==
=== First practice ===
The first practice session was held on Friday, February 11, at 10:00 AM EST. The session lasted for two hours. Penske-Kranefuss Racing's Rusty Wallace set the fastest time in the session, with a lap of 47.555 and an average speed of 189.255 mph (304.576 km/h).

Pos.	#	Driver	Team	Make	Time	Speed
1	2	Rusty Wallace	Penske-Kranefuss Racing	Ford	47.555	189.255
2	88	Dale Jarrett	Robert Yates Racing	Ford	47.559	189.239
3	32	Scott Pruett (R)	PPI Motorsports	Ford	47.566	189.211
Full first practice results

=== Second practice ===
The second practice session was held on Friday, February 11, at 12:30 PM EST. The session lasted for two hours and 20 minutes. Penske-Kranefuss Racing's Rusty Wallace set the fastest time in the session, with a lap of 47.425 and an average speed of 189.773 mph (305.410 km/h).

Pos.	#	Driver	Team	Make	Time	Speed
1	2	Rusty Wallace	Penske-Kranefuss Racing	Ford	47.425	189.773
2	6	Mark Martin	Roush Racing	Ford	47.446	189.689
3	32	Scott Pruett (R)	PPI Motorsports	Ford	47.448	189.681
Full second practice results

=== Third practice ===
The third practice session was held on Saturday, February 12, at 8:30 AM EST. The session lasted for one hour and 10 minutes. Robert Yates Racing's Ricky Rudd set the fastest time in the session, with a lap of 47.344 and an average speed of 190.098 mph (305.933 km/h).

Pos.	#	Driver	Team	Make	Time	Speed
1	28	Ricky Rudd	Robert Yates Racing	Ford	47.344	190.098
2	32	Scott Pruett (R)	PPI Motorsports	Ford	47.434	189.737
3	88	Dale Jarrett	Robert Yates Racing	Ford	47.465	189.613
Full third practice results

=== Fourth practice ===
The fourth practice session was held on Monday, February 14, at 10:00 AM EST. The session lasted for one hour and 30 minutes. Andy Petree Racing's Joe Nemechek set the fastest time in the session, with a lap of 46.663 and an average speed of 192.872 mph (310.397 km/h).

During the session, a crash involving Jeff Fuller and Greg Sacks occurred, forcing both drivers to use backup cars for the Gatorade 125s.

Pos.	#	Driver	Team	Make	Time	Speed
1	33	Joe Nemechek	Andy Petree Racing	Chevrolet	46.663	192.872
2	15	Derrike Cope	Fenley-Moore Motorsports	Ford	46.679	192.806
3	17	Matt Kenseth (R)	Roush Racing	Ford	46.680	192.802
Full fourth practice results

=== Fifth practice ===
The fifth practice session was held on Tuesday, February 15, at 12:30 PM EST. The session lasted for one hour and 55 minutes. Tyler Jet Motorsports' Johnny Benson Jr. set the fastest time in the session, with a lap of 46.375 and an average speed of 194.070 mph (312.325 km/h).

Pos.	#	Driver	Team	Make	Time	Speed
1	10	Johnny Benson Jr.	Tyler Jet Motorsports	Pontiac	46.375	194.070
2	9	Stacy Compton (R)	Melling Racing	Ford	46.565	193.278
3	2	Rusty Wallace	Penske-Kranefuss Racing	Ford	46.590	193.175
Full fifth practice results

=== Sixth practice ===
The sixth practice session was held on Wednesday, February 16, at 10:30 AM EST. The session lasted for one hour and 30 minutes. Penske-Kranefuss Racing's Rusty Wallace set the fastest time in the session, with a lap of 46.367 and an average speed of 194.104 mph (312.380 km/h).

Pos.	#	Driver	Team	Make	Time	Speed
1	2	Rusty Wallace	Penske-Kranefuss Racing	Ford	46.367	194.104
2	94	Bill Elliott	Bill Elliott Racing	Ford	46.380	194.049
3	31	Mike Skinner	Richard Childress Racing	Chevrolet	46.411	193.920
Full sixth practice results

=== Seventh practice ===
The seventh practice session was held on Wednesday, February 16, at 10:30 AM EST. The session lasted for one hour and 30 minutes. Owner-driver Bill Elliott set the fastest time in the session, with a lap of 46.308 and an average speed of 194.351 mph (312.778 km/h).

Pos.	#	Driver	Team	Make	Time	Speed
1	94	Bill Elliott	Bill Elliott Racing	Ford	46.308	194.351
2	7	Michael Waltrip	Mattei Motorsports	Chevrolet	46.320	194.301
3	26	Jimmy Spencer	Haas-Carter Motorsports	Ford	46.466	193.690
Full seventh practice results

=== Final practice ===
The final practice session, sometimes referred to as Happy Hour, was held on Saturday, February 19, after the preliminary 2000 NAPA Auto Parts 300. The session lasted for one hour. Hendrick Motorsports' Jeff Gordon set the fastest time in the session, with a lap of 46.478 and an average speed of 193.640 mph (311.633 km/h).

During the session, Dale Jarrett was involved in a spin in the track's first and second turns after a check-up by Mike Bliss caused a chain reaction of drivers slowing down. Jarrett was, however, able to save the car and continue using the car for the Daytona 500.

Pos.	#	Driver	Team	Make	Time	Speed
1	24	Jeff Gordon	Hendrick Motorsports	Chevrolet	46.478	193.640
2	88	Dale Jarrett	Robert Yates Racing	Ford	46.513	193.494
3	99	Jeff Burton	Roush Racing	Ford	46.521	193.461
Full Happy Hour practice results

== Qualifying ==
Qualifying was set by the 2000 Gatorade 125s. The top two positions were set by qualifying speeds held for the Gatorade 125s held on Saturday, February 12, with the top two qualifiers in the session earning the top two positions for the Daytona 500. The rest of the starting lineup was set in the Gatorade 125s held on Thursday, February 17, during two races. The top 14 finishers in the first race, excluding the pole position winner, set the inside row from rows two to 15, and the top 14 finishers in the second race, excluding the outside pole position winner, set the outside row from rows two to 15. The remaining non-qualifiers set positions 31-36 based on qualifying speeds from the first qualifying session held on Saturday. In addition, six provisionals based on the previous season's owner's points were given out, setting positions 37-42. The final position, position 43, was given to a past series champion who did not otherwise qualify by any other method. If no past champion needed the provisional, the position was given out to the next team in the previous season's owner's points.

Dale Jarrett, driving for Robert Yates Racing, managed to win the pole, setting a time of 47.098 and an average speed of 191.091 miles per hour (307.531 km/h) in Saturday's session.

13 drivers failed to qualify.

=== Full qualifying results ===
Pos.	#	Driver	Team	Make	Reason
1	88	Dale Jarrett	Robert Yates Racing	Ford	Qualified on pole
2	28	Ricky Rudd	Robert Yates Racing	Ford	Qualified on outside pole
3	94	Bill Elliott	Bill Elliott Racing	Ford	First in Twin 125 #1
4	31	Mike Skinner	Richard Childress Racing	Chevrolet	Second in Twin 125 #2
5	2	Rusty Wallace	Penske-Kranefuss Racing	Ford	Third in Twin 125 #1
6	22	Ward Burton	Bill Davis Racing	Pontiac	Third in Twin 125 #2
7	20	Tony Stewart	Joe Gibbs Racing	Pontiac	Fourth in Twin 125 #1
8	8	Dale Earnhardt Jr. (R)	Dale Earnhardt, Inc.	Chevrolet	Fourth in Twin 125 #2
9	6	Mark Martin	Roush Racing	Ford	Fifth in Twin 125 #1
10	7	Michael Waltrip	Mattei Motorsports	Chevrolet	Fifth in Twin 125 #2
11	24	Jeff Gordon	Hendrick Motorsports	Chevrolet	Sixth in Twin 125 #1
12	15	Derrike Cope	Fenley-Moore Motorsports	Ford	Sixth in Twin 125 #2
13	18	Bobby Labonte	Joe Gibbs Racing	Pontiac	Seventh in Twin 125 #1
14	99	Jeff Burton	Roush Racing	Ford	Seventh in Twin 125 #2
15	32	Scott Pruett (R)	PPI Motorsports	Ford	Eighth in Twin 125 #1
16	33	Joe Nemechek	Andy Petree Racing	Chevrolet	Eighth in Twin 125 #2
17	13	Robby Gordon	Team Menard	Ford	Ninth in Twin 125 #1
18	42	Kenny Irwin Jr.	Team SABCO	Chevrolet	Ninth in Twin 125 #2
19	12	Jeremy Mayfield	Penske-Kranefuss Racing	Ford	Tenth in Twin 125 #1
20	25	Jerry Nadeau	Hendrick Motorsports	Chevrolet	Tenth in Twin 125 #2
21	3	Dale Earnhardt	Richard Childress Racing	Chevrolet	11th in Twin 125 #1
22	26	Jimmy Spencer	Haas-Carter Motorsports	Ford	11th in Twin 125 #2
23	36	Ken Schrader	MB2 Motorsports	Pontiac	12th in Twin 125 #1
24	17	Matt Kenseth (R)	Roush Racing	Ford	12th in Twin 125 #2
25	5	Terry Labonte	Hendrick Motorsports	Chevrolet	13th in Twin 125 #1
26	90	Ed Berrier (R)	Donlavey Racing	Ford	13th in Twin 125 #2
27	10	Johnny Benson Jr.	Tyler Jet Motorsports	Pontiac	14th in Twin 125 #1
28	41	Rick Mast	Larry Hedrick Motorsports	Chevrolet	14th in Twin 125 #2
29	97	Chad Little	Roush Racing	Ford	15th in Twin 125 #1
30	43	John Andretti	Petty Enterprises	Pontiac	15th in Twin 125 #2
31	93	Dave Blaney (R)	Bill Davis Racing	Pontiac	Speed provisional (189.310)
32	77	Robert Pressley	Jasper Motorsports	Ford	Speed provisional (189.008)
33	9	Stacy Compton (R)	Melling Racing	Ford	Speed provisional (188.945)
34	75	Wally Dallenbach Jr.	Galaxy Motorsports	Ford	Speed provisional (188.296)
35	14	Mike Bliss (R)	A. J. Foyt Racing	Pontiac	Speed provisional (188.103)
36	1	Steve Park	Dale Earnhardt, Inc.	Chevrolet	Speed provisional (187.997)
37	4	Bobby Hamilton	Morgan–McClure Motorsports	Chevrolet	Owner's points provisional
38	40	Sterling Marlin	Team SABCO	Chevrolet	Owner's points provisional
39	55	Kenny Wallace	Andy Petree Racing	Chevrolet	Owner's points provisional
40	21	Elliott Sadler	Wood Brothers Racing	Ford	Owner's points provisional
41	16	Kevin Lepage	Roush Racing	Ford	Owner's points provisional
42	44	Kyle Petty	Petty Enterprises	Pontiac	Owner's points provisional
43	66	Darrell Waltrip	Haas-Carter Motorsports	Ford	Champion's provisional
Failed to qualify or withdrew
44	60	Geoff Bodine	Joe Bessey Racing	Chevrolet	19th in Twin 125 #1
45	71	Dave Marcis	Marcis Auto Racing	Chevrolet	17th in Twin 125 #2
46	72	Jim Sauter	Marcis Auto Racing	Chevrolet	21st in Twin 125 #1
47	91	Andy Hillenburg	LJ Racing	Chevrolet	18th in Twin 125 #2
48	27	Jeff Fuller	Eel River Racing	Pontiac	25th in Twin 125 #1
49	48	Stanton Barrett	TriStar Motorsports	Ford	23rd in Twin 125 #2
50	85	Carl Long	Mansion Motorsports	Ford	26th in Twin 125 #1
51	50	Ricky Craven	Midwest Transit Racing	Chevrolet	24th in Twin 125 #2
52	11	Brett Bodine	Brett Bodine Racing	Ford	27th in Twin 125 #1
53	96	Greg Sacks	Petty–Huggins Motorsports	Chevrolet	25th in Twin 125 #2
54	89	Bobby Gerhart	Bobby Gerhart Racing	Chevrolet	28th in Twin 125 #1
55	65	Dan Pardus	Jim & Judie Motorsports	Chevrolet	27th in Twin 125 #2
56	84	Norm Benning	Norm Benning Racing	Chevrolet	28th in Twin 125 #2
WD	34	David Green	JKR Motorsports	Chevrolet	Lack of speed
Official Twin 125 Qualifiers results
Official starting lineup

== Race results and criticism ==
The race was criticized by fans and even some drivers. Despite the race having some good moments like the underdog story of Johnny Benson, whose team did not have a sponsor for the entirety of speedweeks until the morning of the race, the race overall was viewed as boring with a lot of single file and spread out racing. Out of the 200 laps of the race, the race saw a total of 9 lead changes and 7 different leaders. It was the second fewest for lead changes in Daytona 500 history behind 1964 that saw 6 lead changes. Fans have called the race the worst of all the Daytona 500 races. Not just fans, but some drivers and members of NASCAR were not thrilled with the race. Two-time Daytona 500 winning crew chief and the crew chief for Mike Skinner, Larry McReynolds, when asked about the race said "They're thinking about building more seats here. They oughta build cots 'cause this stuff is going to put everyone to sleep!" One of McReynolds' former drivers he was with in seven-time Winston Cup Series champion and winner of the 1998 Daytona 500, Dale Earnhardt, voiced his displeasure with the race in his post-race interview saying,

That's the worst racing I've seen at Daytona in a long, long time. They took NASCAR Winston Cup racing and made it some of the sorriest racing, and took the racing out of the drivers' and the crew's hands. We can't adjust, we can't make our cars drive like we want. They've just killed the racing at Daytona. That's all I got to say. Mr. Bill France Sr. [would] probably roll over in his grave if he'd seen that deal.

— Dale Earnhardt

After the race, NASCAR changed its plate package by adding a roof strip on the top of the car to allow more pack racing and more passing which showed in the following years' Daytona 500 as the race had 49 lead changes.

Fin	St	#	Driver	Team	Make	Laps	Led	Status	Pts	Winnings
1	1	88	Dale Jarrett (W)	Robert Yates Racing	Ford	200	89	running	185	$2,277,975
2	14	99	Jeff Burton	Roush Racing	Ford	200	0	running	170	$840,825
3	3	94	Bill Elliott (W)	Bill Elliott Racing	Ford	200	1	running	170	$526,475
4	5	2	Rusty Wallace	Penske-Kranefuss Racing	Ford	200	0	running	160	$420,775
5	9	6	Mark Martin	Roush Racing	Ford	200	65	running	160	$326,175
6	13	18	Bobby Labonte	Joe Gibbs Racing	Pontiac	200	0	running	150	$228,275
7	25	5	Terry Labonte	Hendrick Motorsports	Chevrolet	200	0	running	146	$198,625
8	6	22	Ward Burton	Bill Davis Racing	Pontiac	200	0	running	142	$166,775
9	23	36	Ken Schrader	MB2 Motorsports	Pontiac	200	0	running	138	$143,975
10	24	17	Matt Kenseth (R)	Roush Racing	Ford	200	0	running	134	$182,875
11	19	12	Jeremy Mayfield	Penske-Kranefuss Racing	Ford	200	0	running	130	$129,075
12	27	10	Johnny Benson Jr.	Tyler Jet Motorsports	Pontiac	200	39	running	132	$119,975
13	8	8	Dale Earnhardt Jr. (R)	Dale Earnhardt, Inc.	Chevrolet	200	0	running	124	$107,775
14	18	42	Kenny Irwin Jr.	Team SABCO	Chevrolet	200	0	running	121	$120,025
15	2	28	Ricky Rudd	Robert Yates Racing	Ford	200	1	running	123	$119,475
16	4	31	Mike Skinner	Richard Childress Racing	Chevrolet	200	3	running	120	$112,225
17	7	20	Tony Stewart	Joe Gibbs Racing	Pontiac	200	0	running	112	$118,875
18	17	13	Robby Gordon	Team Menard	Ford	200	0	running	109	$99,725
19	15	32	Scott Pruett (R)	PPI Motorsports	Ford	200	0	running	106	$98,475
20	32	77	Robert Pressley	Jasper Motorsports	Ford	200	0	running	103	$102,825
21	21	3	Dale Earnhardt (W)	Richard Childress Racing	Chevrolet	200	0	running	100	$116,075
22	30	43	John Andretti	Petty Enterprises	Pontiac	200	0	running	97	$113,725
23	29	97	Chad Little	Roush Racing	Ford	200	2	running	99	$105,375
24	38	40	Sterling Marlin (W)	Team SABCO	Chevrolet	199	0	running	91	$104,325
25	42	44	Kyle Petty	Petty Enterprises	Pontiac	199	0	running	88	$108,175
26	33	9	Stacy Compton (R)	Melling Racing	Ford	199	0	running	85	$94,225
27	31	93	Dave Blaney (R)	Bill Davis Racing	Pontiac	199	0	running	82	$89,625
28	28	41	Rick Mast	Larry Hedrick Motorsports	Chevrolet	199	0	running	79	$92,075
29	39	55	Kenny Wallace	Andy Petree Racing	Chevrolet	199	0	running	76	$99,275
30	22	26	Jimmy Spencer	Haas-Carter Motorsports	Ford	197	0	accident	73	$99,225
31	36	1	Steve Park	Dale Earnhardt, Inc.	Chevrolet	197	0	running	70	$98,275
32	43	66	Darrell Waltrip (W)	Haas-Carter Motorsports	Ford	197	0	running	67	$89,325
33	35	14	Mike Bliss (R)	A. J. Foyt Racing	Pontiac	197	0	running	64	$86,875
34	11	24	Jeff Gordon (W)	Hendrick Motorsports	Chevrolet	195	0	running	61	$106,100
35	20	25	Jerry Nadeau	Hendrick Motorsports	Chevrolet	195	0	running	58	$93,450
36	41	16	Kevin Lepage	Roush Racing	Ford	195	0	running	55	$93,000
37	26	90	Ed Berrier (R)	Donlavey Racing	Ford	193	0	track bar	52	$84,550
38	40	21	Elliott Sadler	Wood Brothers Racing	Ford	192	0	accident	49	$92,100
39	10	7	Michael Waltrip	Mattei Motorsports	Chevrolet	192	0	accident	46	$91,650
40	34	75	Wally Dallenbach Jr.	Galaxy Motorsports	Ford	174	0	handling	43	$83,200
41	12	15	Derrike Cope (W)	Fenley-Moore Motorsports	Ford	169	0	engine	40	$82,750
42	16	33	Joe Nemechek	Andy Petree Racing	Chevrolet	131	0	oil pressure	37	$90,300
43	37	4	Bobby Hamilton	Morgan–McClure Motorsports	Chevrolet	68	0	engine	34	$90,100
Failed to qualify or withdrew
44		60	Geoff Bodine	Joe Bessey Racing	Chevrolet					
45		71	Dave Marcis	Marcis Auto Racing	Chevrolet					
46		72	Jim Sauter	Marcis Auto Racing	Chevrolet					
47		91	Andy Hillenburg	LJ Racing	Chevrolet					
48		27	Jeff Fuller	Eel River Racing	Pontiac					
49		48	Stanton Barrett	TriStar Motorsports	Ford					
50		85	Carl Long	Mansion Motorsports	Ford					
51		50	Ricky Craven	Midwest Transit Racing	Chevrolet					
52		11	Brett Bodine	Brett Bodine Racing	Ford					
53		96	Greg Sacks	Petty–Huggins Motorsports	Chevrolet					
54		89	Bobby Gerhart	Bobby Gerhart Racing	Chevrolet					
55		65	Dan Pardus	Jim & Judie Motorsports	Chevrolet					
56		84	Norm Benning	Norm Benning Racing	Chevrolet					
WD		34	David Green	JKR Motorsports	Chevrolet					
Official race results

== Media ==
=== Television ===
The Daytona 500 was covered by CBS in the United States for the twenty second straight year and it was their final Daytona 500 as coverage would switch to Fox in 2001. Mike Joy, two-time NASCAR Cup Series champion Ned Jarrett and 1980 race winner Buddy Baker called the race from the broadcast booth. Dick Berggren, Ralph Sheheen and Bill Stephens handled pit road for the television side. Ken Squier would serve as host.

CBS
Host	Booth announcers		Pit reporters
Host	Lap-by-lap	Color-commentators	Pit reporters
Ken Squier	Mike Joy	Ned Jarrett; Buddy Baker	Dick Berggren; Ralph Sheheen; Bill Stephens

== Standings after the race ==
Drivers' Championship standings

Pos	Driver	Points
1	Dale Jarrett	185
2	Jeff Burton	170 (-15)
3	Bill Elliott	170 (-15)
4	Rusty Wallace	160 (–25)
5	Mark Martin	160 (–25)
6	Bobby Labonte	150 (–35)
7	Terry Labonte	146 (–39)
8	Ward Burton	142 (–43)
9	Ken Schrader	138 (–47)
10	Matt Kenseth	134 (–51)
Official driver's standings

- Note: Only the first 10 positions are included for the driver standings.

== Notes ==
Previous race: 1999 NAPA 500	NASCAR Winston Cup Series; 2000 season	Next race: 2000 Dura Lube/Kmart 400
