= Rick Mast =

American racing driver (born 1957)

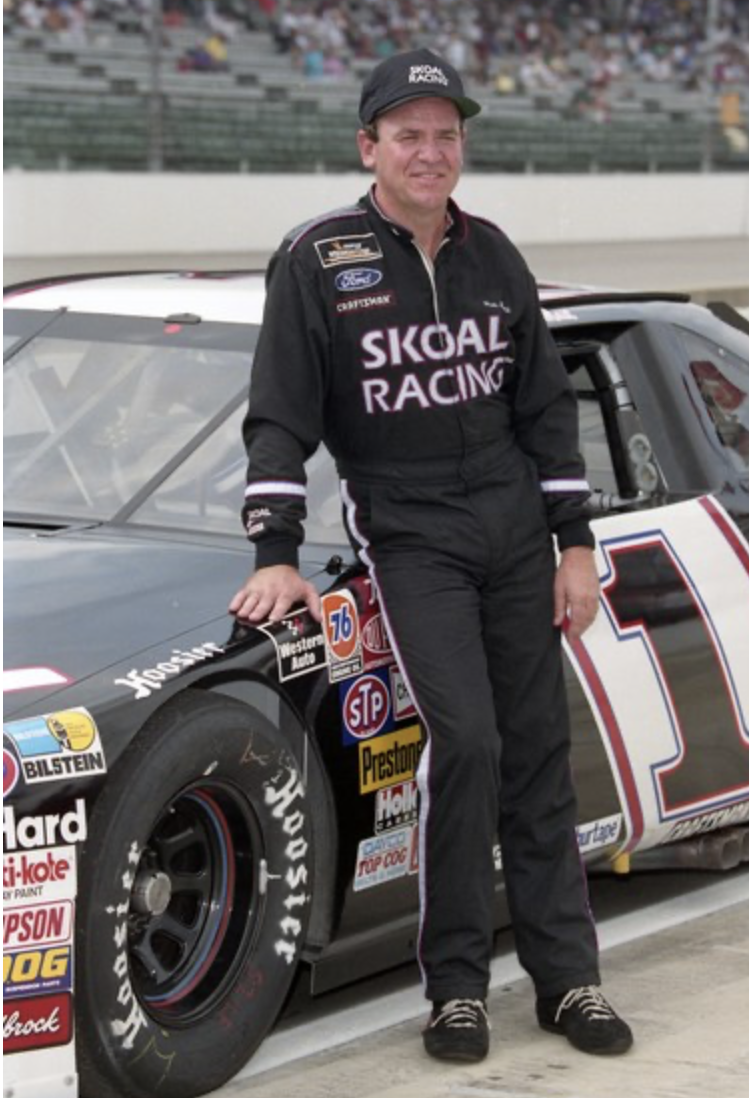
- Mast in 1994
- Born: Richard Kenneth Mast; March 4, 1957 (age 69); Rockbridge Baths, Virginia, U.S.

NASCAR Cup Series career
- 364 races run over 15 years
- Best finish: 18th (1994, 1996)
- First race: 1988 Busch 500 (Bristol)
- Last race: 2002 Pontiac Excitement 400 (Richmond)
Wins	Top tens	Poles
0	36	4

NASCAR O'Reilly Auto Parts Series career
- Best finish: 7th (1985, 1989)
- First race: 1982 Eastern 150 (Richmond)
- Last race: 1998 Pepsi 200 Presented by DeVilbiss (Michigan)
- First win: 1987 Grand National 200 (Dover)
- Last win: 1990 NE Chevy 250 (New Hampshire)
Wins	Top tens	Poles
9	95	5

Richard Kenneth Mast (born March 4, 1957) is an American former NASCAR driver. He competed in both the Winston Cup and Busch Series, retiring in 2002. He holds a business administration degree from Blue Ridge Community College.

== Early career ==
Mast grew up in a racing family, as both his father and uncle were race team owners. He began racing at the age of sixteen at Natural Bridge Speedway and Eastside Speedway, after trading an Angus for his first car.

== NASCAR career ==
=== Busch career ===
After racing at the local track level for the decade, Mast began running the Busch Series in 1982, and had four Top 10 finishes in eleven starts in his No. 22. Mast's first full-time season came in 1985, where he had fifteen Top 10 finishes and finished 7th in points. Two years later, he won his first NASCAR race, at the Grand National 200, then followed it up with another win the next week. He finished 11th in points that year. He improved to eighth position in 1988 the same year he made his Winston Cup debut for Buddy Baker at the Busch 500, finishing 28th at that race. Mast won five Busch races while running full-time the next two years, before focusing his efforts on the Cup Series.

=== Cup career ===
Mast made his Cup debut in a two-race schedule for Baker-Schiff Racing as an injury substitute for Buddy Baker.

==== Car No. 1 ====
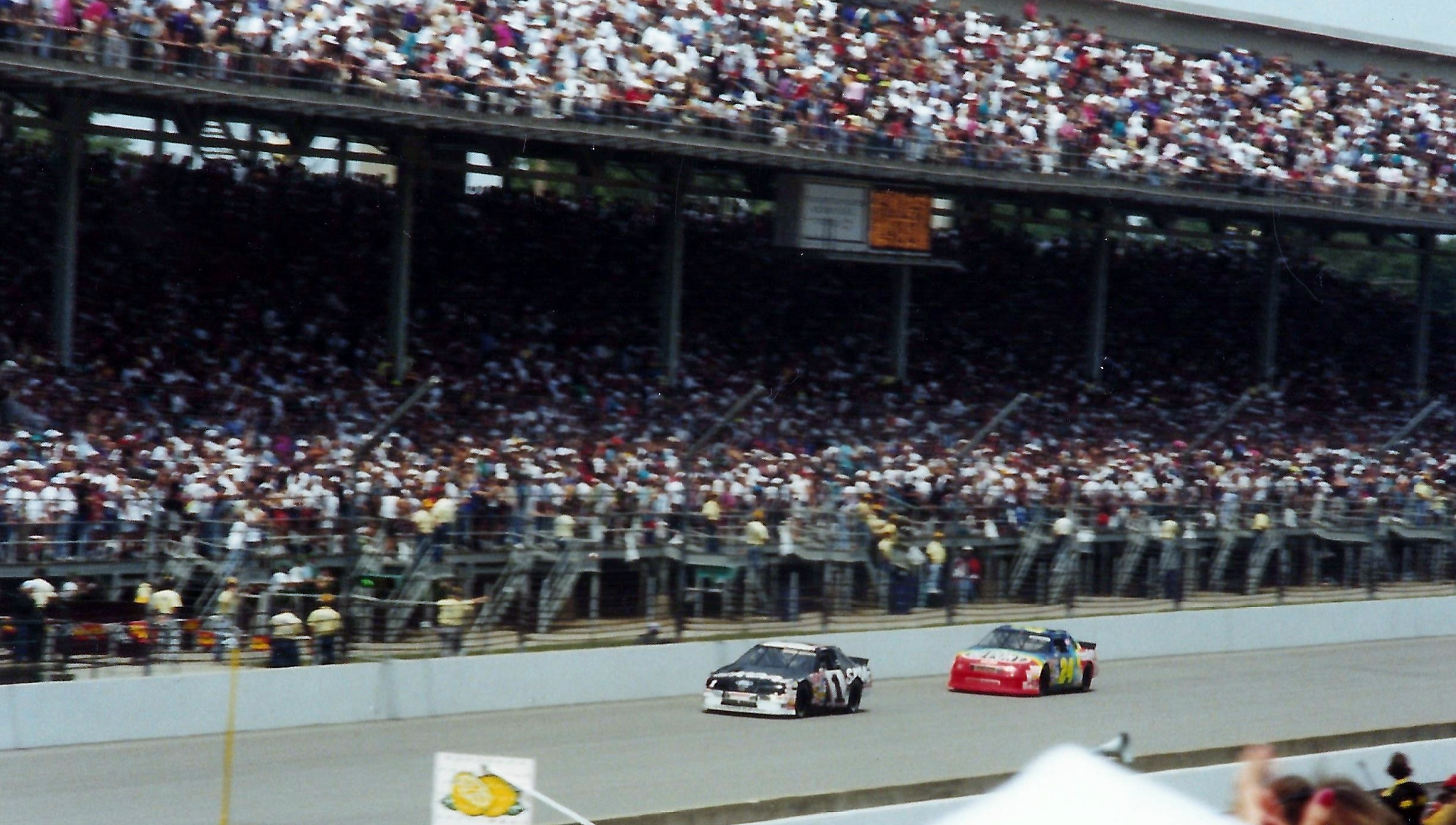
Mast leading Jeff Gordon (No. 24) at the 1994 Brickyard 400.

Mast ran 13 races for Mach 1 Racing in 1989, finishing 6th in the Daytona 500 in an unsponsored car, which Mast called his proudest achievement in racing. It is possible he would have won had his team been willing to gamble on fuel mileage. Mast ran selected races in 1990 for D.K. Ulrich before finishing the year with Travis Carter Motorsports. In 1991, Mast signed to drive the No. 1 Skoal Classic Oldsmobile for Richard Jackson's Precision Products Racing. He started out the season by leading fourteen laps in the Daytona 500 and finished 4th. He had three Top 10's and finished 21st in points. That year, the Talladega Superspeedway produced a couple of highlights for Mast. In the Winston 500, he pushed a fuel-deficient Harry Gant (driving for Leo Jackson, Richard's brother) during the final lap of the race, helping Gant win (Mast was one lap down in 10th). This action is prohibited after the white flag by NASCAR rules, regardless of who the individual drivers are, but he was not fined money or points. With less than 25 laps to go in the DieHard 500, Mast was tapped by Buddy Baker entering the tri-oval and flipped over. He slid to a stop a few hundred feet beyond the start-finish line and soon climbed out of the car, much to the delight of the crowd. He was not injured, but half-jokingly said afterwards, "I'm okay but I need another pair of underwear". The next year, Mast won his first career Cup pole at the final race of the 1992 season, the 1992 Hooters 500, which was Richard Petty's final race, Jeff Gordon's first race, and the day that Alan Kulwicki won the championship by one race position over Bill Elliott. Mast's race ended on the first lap in a crash. The team switched to Ford in 1993. Mast had a career year in 1994, with ten Top 10 finishes and a career-high-tying 18th, finishing a career-best 2nd at Rockingham Speedway, a race where he slid sideways while racing side-by-side with winner Dale Earnhardt coming out of the final corner. In August of that season, he won the pole position at the inaugural Brickyard 400 at the Indianapolis Motor Speedway (a race for which ninety cars were entered), finishing eighteenth in points. In comparison, 1995 was disappointing for Mast, with only three Top 10's. Skoal left at the end of the season, and Hooters replaced them, as the team switched to Pontiac. He had three Top 10's late in the year, but when the season came to a close, he and sponsor Hooter's left PPR.

=== Late 1990s ===
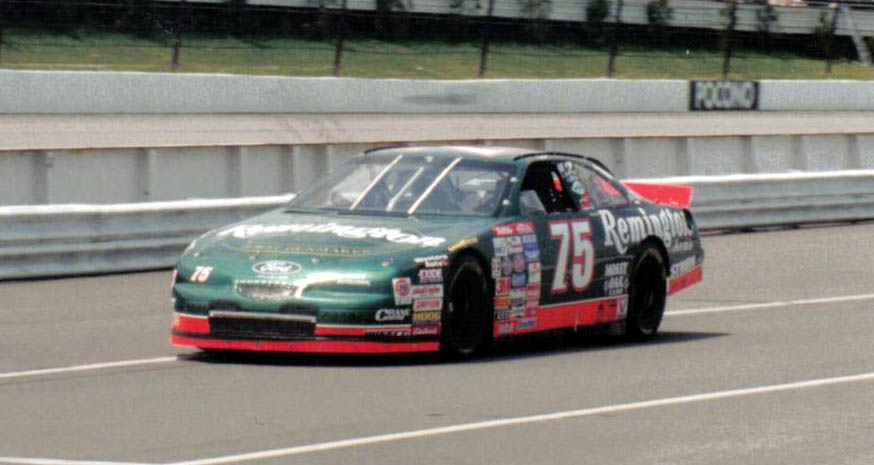
Mast's No. 75 racecar from 1997

Mast signed to drive the No. 75 Remington Arms-sponsored Ford for Butch Mock Motorsports in 1997. Misfortune appeared early as Mast failed to qualify for the Daytona 500, and the season was a struggle. Mast finished 32nd in points that year. 1998 started off better for Mast as he won the pole at the GM Goodwrench Service Plus 400, but his struggles continued, and he left the team when the season came to a close.

After rumors spread that Mast would return to Travis Carter to drive a car sponsored by Kmart, he joined the No. 98 Cale Yarborough-owned team, despite the fact that the team did not have sponsorship. Midway through the season, the team got sponsorship from Universal Studios, and Mast posted two Top 10's and became the first driver since Yarborough to go the whole season without failing to finish a race. However, Universal did not renew their contract, and with questions surrounding Yarborough's plans on continuing to own the team, Mast was out of work again.

=== Final races ===
During the early part of 2000, Mast climbed on board to drive the No. 41 Big Daddy's BBQ Sauce Chevrolet Monte Carlo for Larry Hedrick Motorsports. But after the Food City 500, Mast departed for A.J. Foyt Racing, and had two Top 10 finishes.

Mast began 2001 with Midwest Transit Racing, but due to sponsorship issues, they only ran part-time, and Mast soon left to drive the No. 27 Duke's Mayonnaise Pontiac Grand Prix for Eel River Racing, but late in the season, the team closed down, and Mast was out of work once again. He made a deal with Donlavey Racing for the final races of the season, running an unsponsored No. 90 Ford after the team's previous sponsor, Hills Brothers Coffee, abruptly left the team to sign with Bill Davis Racing.

== Retirement and legacy ==
Starting in the 1990s, NASCAR drivers switched to a full-face helmet with a forced-air induction tube. In May 2002, Mast began feeling ill suddenly. He had lost weight and was forced to miss races to take medical tests to find out what was wrong. It turned out that he had suffered carbon monoxide poisoning and Mast was forced to retire. He officially retired on January 22, 2003, at the age of 45. After his retirement, he spoke with NASCAR president Mike Helton about having teams redesign their air intake systems to reduce exhaust fumes from entering the fresh-air systems in drivers' helmets.

When I got sick, I spent six or eight months forced to stay at home. I didn't have no choice in the matter. I laid in the bed the biggest part of the time, laying there ready to die. Those six or eight months ... I started seeing a different lifestyle, a life that I had never had. I started getting acclimated to that. As time went on, less and less did I want to have to travel.

When he stopped racing, Mast had an offer from Petty Enterprises to drive the team's No. 45 car for the back half of the 2002 season.

NASCAR increased research into forced-air induction systems as a result of Mast's retirement. As NASCAR had mandated full-face helmets, teams were using forced-air inlet systems taking air from the car into the driver. By the Coca-Cola 600 in May 2003, NASCAR approved a carbon monoxide filter to be used into air intake systems. In 2007, NASCAR phased out leaded racing fuel, with specification fuel supplier Sunoco switching to unleaded racing fuel starting with the second round of the season. A month later, NASCAR's fifth-generation Cup Series car changed the exhaust exit location to be away from the driver and it cited carbon monoxide poisoning cases like Mast's as a reason for the change.

== Personal life ==
As of 2007, he currently resides in his hometown of Rockbridge Baths, Virginia. He owns and operates RKM EnviroClean, Inc. which specializes in environmental clean-up services, underground utilities contracting, and site demolition. Additionally, Mast also remains actively involved with his charitable organization, the Rick Mast Foundation.

In 2018, Rick and his son Ricky started a podcast entitled Mast Cast where the two discuss Rick's driving days and current events in NASCAR.

Mast and his wife Sharon have three children: Ricky, Kaitie, and Sarah. He did some announcing after he retired from racing, but decided that he wanted to stay home to help raise his twin daughters after missing out on most too much of Ricky's upbringing. Ricky is the Digital Content Manager for Major League Baseball's Atlanta Braves. Sarah and Kaitie attend the University of Virginia, and James Madison University, respectively.

In the movie Days of Thunder, Mast drove as a stunt double in Rowdy Burns' car for scenes shot at the Daytona International Speedway. The footage was shot during qualifying and during the Duel qualifying races.

== Motorsports career results ==
=== NASCAR ===
(key) (Bold – Pole position awarded by qualifying time. Italics – Pole position earned by points standings or practice time. * – Most laps led.)

==== Winston Cup Series ====
NASCAR Winston Cup Series results
Year	Team	No.	Make	1	2	3	4	5	6	7	8	9	10	11	12	13	14	15	16	17	18	19	20	21	22	23	24	25	26	27	28	29	30	31	32	33	34	35	36	NWCC	Pts	Ref
1988	Baker-Schiff Racing	88	Olds	DAY	RCH	CAR	ATL	DAR	BRI	NWS	MAR	TAL	CLT	DOV	RSD	POC	MCH	DAY	POC	TAL	GLN	MCH	BRI; 28	DAR; 32	RCH	DOV	MAR	CLT	NWS	CAR	PHO	ATL								NA	0	
1989	Mach 1 Racing	66	Chevy	DAY; 6	CAR; 21	ATL; 25	RCH; 16	DAR; 34	BRI; 14	NWS; 25	MAR; 32	TAL; DNQ	CLT; 11	DOV	SON	POC	MCH	DAY	POC	TAL; 32	GLN	MCH	BRI; 13	DAR	RCH	DOV	MAR	CLT; 13	NWS	CAR	PHO	ATL; 31								35th	1315	
1990	U.S. Racing	2	Pontiac	DAY	RCH; 21	CAR; 19	ATL; 35	DAR; 39	BRI; 12		MAR; 29	TAL; 17	CLT; 31	DOV; 28	SON	POC	MCH	DAY																						31st	1719	
1990	U.S. Racing	2	Chevy							NWS; 23																														31st	1719	
1990	U.S. Racing	22	Pontiac																POC; 22	TAL	GLN	MCH; 36	BRI; 24	DAR; 24	RCH	DOV														31st	1719	
1990	Travis Carter Enterprises	98	Chevy																								MAR; 31	NWS; 32	CLT; 34	CAR; 22	PHO; 7	ATL; 29								31st	1719	
1991	Precision Products Racing	1	Olds	DAY; 4	RCH; 35	CAR; 30	ATL; 29	DAR; 13	BRI; 18	NWS; 12	MAR; 13	TAL; 10	CLT; 30	DOV; 20	SON; 19	POC; 25	MCH; 29	DAY; 19	POC; 27	TAL; 28	GLN; 35	MCH; 18	BRI; 26	DAR; 11	RCH; 27	DOV; 9	MAR; 13	NWS; 25	CLT; 13	CAR; 18	PHO; 28	ATL; 28								21st	2918	
1992	Precision Products Racing	1	Olds	DAY; 13	CAR; 12	RCH; 18	ATL; 22	DAR; 17	BRI; 30	NWS; 23	MAR; 14	TAL; 17	CLT; 23	DOV; 32	SON; 11	POC; 30	MCH; 28	DAY; 17	POC; 24	TAL; 26	GLN; 32	MCH; 13	BRI; 29	DAR; 23	RCH; 28	DOV; 24	MAR; 9	NWS; 21	CLT; 35	CAR; 17	PHO; 17	**ATL**; 28								22nd	2830	
1993	Precision Products Racing	1	Ford	DAY; 12	CAR; 39	RCH; 35	ATL; 30	DAR; 15	BRI; 10	NWS; 19	MAR; 11	TAL; 13	SON; 29	CLT; 31	DOV; 6	POC; 16	MCH; 11	DAY; 16	NHA; 16	POC; 36	TAL; 38	GLN; 37	MCH; 33	BRI; 5	DAR; 32	RCH; 18	DOV; 18	MAR; 26	NWS; 8	CLT; 18	CAR; 17	PHO; 10	ATL; 37							21st	3001	
1994	Precision Products Racing	1	Ford	DAY; 27	CAR; 3	RCH; 7	ATL; 26	DAR; 37	BRI; 29	NWS; 10	MAR; 8	TAL; 20	SON; 34	CLT; 31	DOV; 30	POC; 9	MCH; 13	DAY; 29	NHA; 9	POC; 40	TAL; 20	**IND**; 22	GLN; 38	MCH; 3	BRI; 10	DAR; 20	RCH; 33	DOV; 15	MAR; 29	NWS; 3	CLT; 12	CAR; 2	PHO; 42	ATL; 27						18th	3238	
1995	Precision Products Racing	1	Ford	DAY; 21	CAR; 35	RCH; 34	ATL; 11	DAR; 26	BRI; 15	NWS; 8	MAR; 34	TAL; 28	SON; 16	CLT; 14	DOV; 13	POC; 21	MCH; 34	DAY; 26	NHA; 11	POC; 13	TAL; 17	IND; 8	GLN; 37	MCH; 31	BRI; 26	DAR; 26	RCH; 12	**DOV**; 28	MAR; 28	NWS; 26	CLT; 36	CAR; 34*	PHO; 9	ATL; 21						21st	2984	
1996	Precision Products Racing	1	Pontiac	DAY; 28	CAR; 10	RCH; 19	ATL; 34	DAR; 19	BRI; 12	NWS; 14	MAR; 15	TAL; 15	SON; 19	CLT; 12	DOV; 35	POC; 28	MCH; 18	DAY; 20	NHA; 13	POC; 30	TAL; 41	IND; 9	GLN; 27	MCH; 16	BRI; 35	DAR; 22	RCH; 19	DOV; 6	MAR; 4	NWS; 6	CLT; 15	CAR; 38	PHO; 38	ATL; 13						18th	3190	
1997	Butch Mock Motorsports	75	Ford	DAY; DNQ	CAR; 21	RCH; 18	ATL; 17	DAR; 19	TEX; 31	BRI; 17	MAR; 36	SON; DNQ	TAL; 22	CLT; 20	DOV; 12	POC; 20	MCH; 30	CAL; 41	DAY; 18	NHA; 28	POC; 25	IND; 23	GLN; 23	MCH; 38	BRI; 33	DAR; 34	RCH; 26	NHA; 20	DOV; 10	MAR; 23	CLT; DNQ	TAL; 9	CAR; 42	PHO; 31	ATL; 35					32nd	2569	
1998	Butch Mock Motorsports	75	Ford	DAY; 30	**CAR**; 12	LVS; 11	ATL; 33	DAR; 43	BRI; 25	TEX; 41	MAR; 33	TAL; 18	CAL; 25	CLT; 26	DOV; 11	RCH; 43	MCH; 31	POC; 38	SON; 8	NHA; 32	POC; 37	IND; 22	GLN; 30	MCH; 26	BRI; 35	NHA; 22	DAR; 36	RCH; 31	DOV; 24	MAR; 41	CLT; 34	TAL; DNQ	DAY; DNQ	PHO; 29	CAR; 42	ATL; DNQ				33rd	2296	
1999	Cale Yarborough Motorsports	98	Ford	DAY; 10	CAR; 35	LVS; 19	ATL; 16	DAR; 13	TEX; 30	BRI; 19	MAR; 42	TAL; 24	CAL; 31	RCH; 16	CLT; 34	DOV; 34	MCH; 37	POC; 12	SON; 23	DAY; 32	NHA; 30	POC; 19	IND; 36	GLN; 23	MCH; 12	BRI; 21	DAR; 30	RCH; 41	NHA; 9	DOV; 34	MAR; 29	CLT; 25	TAL; 26	CAR; 38	PHO; 36	HOM; 28	ATL; 41			32nd	2845	
2000	Larry Hedrick Motorsports	41	Chevy	DAY; 28	CAR; 33	LVS; DNQ	ATL; 21	DAR; 30	BRI; 34																															33rd	2366	
2000	A.J. Foyt Racing	14	Pontiac							TEX; 20	MAR; DNQ	TAL; DNQ	CAL; 39	RCH; DNQ	CLT; 39	DOV; 43	MCH; 30	POC; 35	SON; DNQ	DAY; 31	NHA; 12	POC; 8	IND; 38	GLN; 19	MCH; 29	BRI; 29	DAR; 12	RCH; 28	NHA; 32	DOV; 10	MAR; 26	CLT; 17	TAL; 31	CAR; 13	PHO; 39	HOM; 29	ATL; 35			33rd	2366	
2001	Midwest Transit Racing	50	Chevy	DAY; DNQ	CAR; 32	LVS; DNQ	ATL; DNQ	DAR; DNQ	BRI; 36	TEX; DNQ	MAR; 41	TAL; DNQ	CAL	RCH; 20	CLT; 32	DOV; DNQ	MCH; DNQ	POC; 22	SON	DAY; 34	CHI	NHA; 14																		45th	1187	
2001	Eel River Racing	27	Pontiac																				POC; 35	IND; DNQ	GLN; 27	MCH; 39	BRI; 41	DAR; 30	RCH; 34	DOV; DNQ	KAN; DNQ	CLT								45th	1187	
2001	Richard Childress Racing	29	Chevy																														MAR; QL^{†}							45th	1187	
2001	Donlavey Racing	91	Ford																															TAL; DNQ						45th	1187	
2001	Donlavey Racing	90	Ford																																PHO; 25	CAR; DNQ	HOM; 38	ATL; DNQ	NHA; 28	45th	1187	
2002	Donlavey Racing	90	Ford	DAY; DNQ	CAR; 34	LVS; 40	ATL; 33	DAR; 24	BRI; 33	TEX; 29	MAR; 37	TAL; DNQ	CAL; 32	RCH; 35	CLT	DOV	POC	MCH	SON	DAY	CHI	NHA	POC	IND	GLN	MCH	BRI	DAR	RCH	NHA	DOV	KAN	TAL	CLT	MAR	ATL	CAR	PHO	HOM	47th	576	
^{†} - As Kevin Harvick was in Memphis Motorsports Park for the second-tier series race (he was to run the full season), Mast qualified the Childress No. 29 Cup car.

===== Daytona 500 =====
Year	Team	Manufacturer	Start	Finish
1989	Mach 1 Racing	Chevrolet	11	6
1991	Precision Products Racing	Oldsmobile	7	4
1992	Precision Products Racing	Oldsmobile	13	13
1993	Precision Products Racing	Ford	31	12
1994	Precision Products Racing	Ford	30	27
1995	Precision Products Racing	Ford	41	21
1996	Precision Products Racing	Pontiac	31	28
1997	Butch Mock Motorsports	Ford	DNQ	
1998	Butch Mock Motorsports	Ford	27	30
1999	Cale Yarborough Motorsports	Ford	21	10
2000	Larry Hedrick Motorsports	Chevrolet	28	28
2001	Midwest Transit Racing	Chevrolet	DNQ	
2002	Donlavey Racing	Ford	DNQ	

==== Busch Series ====
NASCAR Busch Series results
Year	Team	No.	Make	1	2	3	4	5	6	7	8	9	10	11	12	13	14	15	16	17	18	19	20	21	22	23	24	25	26	27	28	29	30	31	32	33	34	35	NBGNC	Pts	Ref
1982	A.G. Dillard Motorsports	22	Pontiac	DAY	RCH; 3	BRI	MAR; 22	DAR	HCY	SBO; 17	CRW	RCH	LGY	DOV	HCY	CLT	ASH	HCY	SBO; 5	CAR	CRW	SBO	HCY	LGY	IRP; 7	BRI; 11	HCY; 12	RCH; 8	MAR; 19		HCY; 22	MAR; 30							18th	1350	
1982	A.G. Dillard Motorsports	22	Plymouth																											CLT; DNQ									18th	1350	
1983	A.G. Dillard Motorsports	22	Pontiac	DAY	RCH; 19	CAR	HCY; 18	MAR; 35	NWS; 21	SBO; 19	GPS; 20	LGY; 10	DOV	BRI; 4	CLT	SBO; 4	HCY	ROU; 16	SBO; 19	ROU	CRW	ROU	SBO; 7	HCY	LGY	IRP; 11	GPS	BRI; 5	HCY	DAR	RCH; 17	NWS	SBO; 18	MAR; 10	ROU; 6	CLT	HCY; 15	MAR; 25	20th	2399	
1984	Boyd Nelson	99	Pontiac	DAY	RCH; 16	CAR	HCY; 11	MAR; 25	DAR	ROU; 21	NSV; 11	LGY; 14	MLW	DOV	CLT	SBO; 14	HCY; 22	ROU; 19	SBO; 7	ROU; 10	HCY; 12	IRP; 20	LGY; 8	SBO; 16	BRI; 4	DAR	RCH; 23	NWS; 22		HCY; 22	CAR	MAR							15th	2208	
1984	A.G. Dillard Motorsports	99	Pontiac																										CLT; 16										15th	2208	
1985	A.G. Dillard Motorsports	2	Pontiac	DAY; 32																																			7th	3589	
1985	A.G. Dillard Motorsports	44	Pontiac		CAR; 20				DAR; 8			DOV; 4	CLT; 6										DAR; 7				CLT; 8		CAR; 7										7th	3589	
1985	A.G. Dillard Motorsports	22	Pontiac			HCY; 15	BRI; 2	MAR; 2		SBO; 15	LGY; 11			SBO; 5	HCY; 12	ROU; 12	IRP; 6	SBO; 6	LGY; 8	HCY; 16	MLW; 2	BRI; 6		RCH; 12	NWS; 18	ROU; 9		HCY; 21		MAR; 32									7th	3589	
1986	A.G. Dillard Motorsports	22	Pontiac	DAY; 7	CAR; 4	HCY; 10	MAR; 10	BRI; 23	DAR; 26	SBO; 14	LGY; 12	JFC; 8	DOV; 30	CLT; 34						RAL; 10		SBO; 16	HCY; 10	LGY; 22			DAR; 28	RCH; 21	DOV; 18		ROU; 14	CLT; 13	CAR; 8	MAR; 26					11th	3649	
1986	A.G. Dillard Motorsports	22	Chevy												SBO; 25	HCY; 9	ROU; 9	IRP; 13	SBO; 19		OXF; 23				ROU; 4	BRI; 6				MAR; 10									11th	3649	
1987	A.G. Dillard Motorsports	22	Pontiac	DAY; 9	HCY; 26	MAR; 3	DAR; 22	BRI; 11	LGY; 9	SBO; 22	CLT; 19		IRP; 9	ROU; 26	JFC; 25	OXF; 43	SBO; 12	HCY; 18	RAL; 25	LGY; 14	ROU; 15	BRI; 3	JFC; 20		RCH; 20		MAR; 1			MAR; 11									11th	3226	
1987	A.G. Dillard Motorsports	22	Buick									**DOV**; 21												DAR; 6		DOV; 1		CLT; 18	CAR; 8										11th	3226	
1988	A.G. Dillard Motorsports	22	Buick	DAY; 10	HCY; 15	CAR; 7	MAR; 7	DAR; 33	BRI; 9	LNG; 11	NZH; 1	SBO; 10	NSV; 13	CLT; 21	DOV; 23	ROU; 14	LAN; 12	LVL; 21	MYB; 6	OXF; 13	SBO; 5	HCY; 8	LNG; 5	IRP; 18	ROU; 1*	BRI; 17	DAR; 12	RCH; 25	DOV; 21	MAR; 6	CLT; 25	CAR; 27	MAR; 5						8th	3773	
1989	A.G. Dillard Motorsports	22	Buick	DAY; 27	CAR; 36	MAR; 31	HCY; 7	DAR; 13	BRI; 3	NZH; 12	SBO; 5	LAN; 7	NSV; 1	CLT; 5	DOV; 19	ROU; 3	LVL; 19	VOL; 7	**MYB**; 17	SBO; 19	HCY; 4	DUB; 1	IRP; 35	ROU; 4	BRI; 3	DAR; 24	RCH; 27	DOV; 7	MAR; 23	CLT; 30	CAR; 13	**MAR**; 28							7th	3558	
1990	A.G. Dillard Motorsports	22	Buick	DAY; 27	RCH; 32	CAR; 25	MAR; 14	HCY; 18	DAR; 14	BRI; 12	LAN; 25	SBO; 5	NZH; 15	HCY; 8	CLT; 32	DOV; 34	ROU; 12	VOL; 29	MYB; 12	OXF; 4	NHA; 5	SBO; 4	DUB; 19	IRP; 30	ROU; 10	BRI; 1	DAR; 27	RCH; 1	DOV; 2	**MAR**; 25	CLT; 23	NHA; 1*	CAR; 17	MAR; 32					10th	3617	
1992	Precision Products Racing	0	Olds	DAY; 6	CAR	RCH; 6	ATL; 16	MAR	DAR; 16	BRI; 13	HCY	LAN	DUB	NZH	CLT; 36	DOV	ROU	MYB	GLN	VOL	NHA	TAL	IRP	ROU	MCH	NHA	BRI	DAR; 14	RCH; 15	DOV	CLT; 38	MAR; 8	CAR; 40	HCY					35th	1182	
1993	Precision Products Racing	0	Olds	DAY; DNQ	CAR	**RCH**; 8	DAR; 34	BRI	HCY	ROU	MAR	NZH												RCH; QL^{†}	DOV	ROU													49th	535	
1993	Precision Products Racing	0	Chevy										CLT; 10	DOV	MYB	GLN	MLW	TAL	IRP	MCH	NHA	BRI	DAR; 10				CLT; 33	MAR	CAR	HCY	ATL								49th	535	
1998	Spencer Motor Ventures	12	Chevy	DAY	CAR	LVS	NSV	DAR	BRI	TEX	HCY	TAL	NHA	NZH	CLT	DOV	RCH	PPR	GLN	MLW	MYB	CAL	SBO	IRP	MCH; 10	BRI	DAR	RCH	DOV	CLT	GTY	CAR	ATL	HOM					88th	134	
^{†} - Qualified but replaced by Tommy Houston

=== ARCA Talladega SuperCar Series ===
(key) (Bold – Pole position awarded by qualifying time. Italics – Pole position earned by points standings or practice time. * – Most laps led.)

ARCA Talladega SuperCar Series results
Year	Team	No.	Make	1	2	3	4	5	6	7	8	9	10	11	12	13	14	ATCSC	Pts	Ref
1985	Rick Mast Racing	22	Pontiac	ATL	DAY	ATL	TAL	ATL	SSP	IRP; 6	CSP	FRS	IRP	OEF	ISF	DSF	TOL	112th	-	
