= 1999 Pennzoil 400 =

Race details
- Race 33 of 34 in the 1999 NASCAR Winston Cup Series season
- Layout of Homestead-Miami Speedway
- Date: November 14, 1999
- Location: Homestead Miami Speedway (Homestead, Florida)
- Course: Permanent racing facility
- Course length: 1.5 miles (2.4 km)
- Distance: 267 laps, 400.5 mi (644.52 km)
- Weather: Temperatures averaging around 74.2 °F (23.4 °C); wind speeds reaching up to 20.8 miles per hour (33.5 km/h)
- Average speed: 140.335 miles per hour (225.847 km/h)

Pole position
Driver	David Green	Tyler Jet Motorsports

Most laps led
Driver	Bobby Labonte	Joe Gibbs Racing
- Laps: 174

Winner
No. 20	Tony Stewart	Joe Gibbs Racing

Television in the United States
- Network: NBC
- Announcers: Allen Bestwick, Joe Gibbs, & Mike Wallace

The 1999 Pennzoil 400 Presented by Kmart was an inaugural NASCAR Winston Cup Series race held on November 14, 1999, at Homestead Miami Speedway in Homestead, Florida. Contested over 267 laps on the 1.5 mile (2.4 km) speedway, it was the 33rd race of the 1999 NASCAR Winston Cup Series season and the first at Homestead-Miami Speedway. Tony Stewart of Joe Gibbs Racing won the race, his teammate Bobby Labonte finished second and Roush Racing driver Jeff Burton was third.

David Green would earn his only pole position during qualifying. He led the first seven laps until John Andretti passed him on lap eight. Labonte took the lead on lap 27, holding the place for a total of 174 laps, more than any other driver. On the 228th lap, Stewart overtook Labonte for the first position, and later went on to win the event, his third career triumph in the Cup Series. Drivers' Championship leader Dale Jarrett had a lead of 231 points entering the race, and his fifth-place finish was enough to clinch the championship a week early, and claim his first (and only) NASCAR Cup Series title, leading by 211 points over Labonte at the checkered flag. There was a single caution and a total of nineteen lead changes amongst ten different drivers during the course of the race.

This was the last race without Dale Earnhardt Jr. until the 2012 Bank of America 500.

The race was televised by NBC Sports, marking the first time the network had carried a Cup Series race live since 1985. Brian Williams, then of NBC News, hosted the studio segments of the race while Allen Bestwick, then of Turner Sports, was the lead broadcaster. Team owner Joe Gibbs and driver Mike Wallace were analysts, while Bestwick's colleague Marty Snider and future ESPN NASCAR reporter Mike Massaro reported from pit road.

== Race results ==
Pos	No.	Driver	Team	Manufacturer	Laps
1	20	Tony Stewart (R)	Joe Gibbs Racing	Pontiac	267
2	18	Bobby Labonte	Joe Gibbs Racing	Pontiac	267
3	99	Jeff Burton	Roush Racing	Ford	267
4	6	Mark Martin	Roush Racing	Ford	267
5	88	Dale Jarrett	Robert Yates Racing	Ford	267
6	31	Mike Skinner	Richard Childress Racing	Chevrolet	267
7	44	Kyle Petty	Petty Enterprises	Pontiac	267
8	3	Dale Earnhardt	Richard Childress Racing	Chevrolet	266, 1 lap down
9	25	Wally Dallenbach Jr.	Hendrick Motorsports	Chevrolet	266, 1 lap down
10	24	Jeff Gordon	Hendrick Motorsports	Chevrolet	266, 1 lap down
11	60	Geoff Bodine	Joe Bessey Motorsports	Chevrolet	266, 1 lap down
12	2	Rusty Wallace	Penske-Kranefuss Racing	Ford	266, 1 lap down
13	12	Jeremy Mayfield	Penske-Kranefuss Racing	Ford	266, 1 lap down
14	22	Ward Burton	Bill Davis Racing	Pontiac	266, 1 lap down
15	55	Kenny Wallace	Andy Petree Racing	Chevrolet	266, 1 lap down
16	43	John Andretti	Petty Enterprises	Pontiac	266, 1 lap down
17	40	Sterling Marlin	Team SABCO	Chevrolet	266, 1 lap down
18	21	Elliott Sadler (R)	Wood Brothers Racing	Ford	265, 2 laps down
19	1	Steve Park	Dale Earnhardt, Inc.	Chevrolet	265, 2 laps down
20	23	Jimmy Spencer	Haas-Carter Motorsports	Ford	265, 2 laps down
21	42	Joe Nemechek	Team SABCO	Chevrolet	265, 2 laps down
22	45	David Green	Tyler Jet Motorsports	Pontiac	265, 2 laps down
23	93	Dave Blaney	Bill Davis Racing	Pontiac	265, 2 laps down
24	94	Bill Elliott	Bill Elliott Racing	Ford	265, 2 laps down
25	4	Bobby Hamilton	Morgan-McClure Motorsports	Chevrolet	264, 3 laps down
26	16	Kevin Lepage	Roush Racing	Ford	264, 3 laps down
27	30	Todd Bodine	Bahari Racing	Pontiac	264, 3 laps down
28	98	Rick Mast	Cale Yarborough Motorsports	Ford	264, 3 laps down
29	33	Ken Schrader	Andy Petree Racing	Chevrolet	263, 4 laps down
30	9	Stacy Compton	Melling Racing	Ford	263, 4 laps down
31	5	Terry Labonte	Hendrick Motorsports	Chevrolet	263, 4 laps down
32	50	Ricky Craven	Midwest Transit Racing	Chevrolet	263, 4 laps down
33	28	Kenny Irwin Jr.	Robert Yates Racing	Ford	262, 5 laps down
34	14	Boris Said	Irvan-Simo Racing	Ford	262, 5 laps down
35	26	Johnny Benson	Roush Racing	Ford	262, 5 laps down
36	7	Michael Waltrip	Mattei Motorsports	Chevrolet	262, 5 laps down
37	77	Robert Pressley	Jasper Motorsports	Ford	261, 6 laps down
38	36	Jerry Nadeau	MB2 Motorsports	Pontiac	260, 7 laps down
39	97	Chad Little	Roush Racing	Ford	245, out (engine)
40	11	Brett Bodine	Brett Bodine Racing	Ford	238, 29 laps down
41	10	Ricky Rudd	Rudd Performance Motorsports	Ford	184, out (engine)
42	75	Ted Musgrave	Galaxy Motorsports	Ford	182, out (ignition)
43	66	Darrell Waltrip	Haas-Carter Motorsports	Ford	85, out (handling)

=== Failed to Qualify ===
- 71 - Dave Marcis
- 90 - Ed Berrier
- 41 - Derrike Cope
- 04 - Andy Belmont
- 61 - Bob Strait
