= Tyler Jet Motorsports =

Defunct NASCAR team

- Owner: Tim Beverley
- Base: Harrisburg, North Carolina
- Series: Winston Cup Series
- Race drivers: Johnny Benson, Darrell Waltrip, Rich Bickle, David Green
- Manufacturer: Pontiac, Chevrolet
- Opened: 1998
- Closed: 2000

Career
- Drivers' Championships: 0
- Race victories: 0

Tyler Jet Motorsports (TJM) was a NASCAR Winston Cup Series team.

== History ==
Tyler Jet Motorsports was owned by Tim Beverley, owner of the airplane sales company that shared a name with the race team, and was formed in 1998 when Beverley bought Darrell Waltrip's race team after Waltrip could not find sponsorship to continue running as an owner-driver. Beverly later bought the NASCAR operation of ISM Racing after owner Bob Hancher backed out of the Cup Series at the midway point of the season, having failed to qualify for the majority of events they had entered with the No. 35 Tabasco Pontiac. Beverley combined the two operations into one, fielding the former ISM car with Waltrip, who had spent the interim period as a long term substitute at Dale Earnhardt, Inc., starting to drive the No. 35 at Indianapolis. However, Beverley had inherited problems that began when Hancher, against the wishes of Tabasco maker McIlhenny Company, had fired Todd Bodine earlier in the season. McIlhenny became even more furious when Beverley switched manufacturers from Pontiac to Chevrolet immediately after signing Waltrip to drive the No. 35, and a court battle ensued that forced Beverley to resume running Pontiacs beginning with the Pepsi 400 at Michigan. The team's best finish was in its first race, with Waltrip finishing thirteenth in a Chevrolet. The No. 35 only ran in the top-20 once more before the season ended, and after the season McIlhenny, who had been using the race team more as a marketing tool than anything else, pulled its sponsorship from the No. 35 and left NASCAR altogether; this ended what has been referred to as the "Tabasco Fiasco" in NASCAR circles in the years since. Waltrip left the team as well following the 1998 season, joining Haas-Carter Motorsports for what would be the last two years of his career.

In 1999, the team fielded Pontiacs and switched to the No. 45, with sponsorship from the 10-10-345 long-distance telephone service. Rich Bickle, (who incidentally, had driven for Darrell Waltrip in the Craftsman Truck Series) was hired as the driver, but was released late in the season, and was replaced by David Green. Green recorded the best finish of his Cup series career, a 12th at Phoenix, and won the only pole in his (and the team's) Cup career, the following weekend at the inaugural Cup series race at Homestead-Miami Speedway. During the team's first two seasons of operations, four drivers and three crew chiefs were hired.

For the 2000 season, Tyler Jet switched to the No. 10 and hired Johnny Benson to pilot the car on November 22, 1999. Their first exposure came at the Daytona 500, where the team did not have a sponsor for the entirety of speedweeks which the car was white just the black No. 10 on the side. The team would get a sponsor on late Saturday night, the night before the race where Lycos came on to sponsor them. The decals were put on the car on the morning of the race. Benson started 27th and took the lead late in the race with 43 laps to go with pit strategy by taking two tires and held the lead for 39 laps, only to be passed by Dale Jarrett and other cars that had made full pit stops under a late race caution and finished 12th.

Lycos signed on as sponsor for the No. 10 and stayed with them until the 2000 Pepsi 400, where Tyler Jet pulled them off the car due to nonpayment; Lycos would eventually sue Tyler Jet on July 16, 2001. They would run unsponsored for the next four races, but Beverley was forced to sell the team afterwards. The car, which had just acquired sponsorship from Aaron's, was sold to MB2 Motorsports on July 20. The team would continue to be based in Tyler Jet's shop located near Lowe's Motor Speedway, and ran until the end of the 2005 season when the car number, sponsor (Valvoline) and driver (Scott Riggs) moved to Evernham Motorsports. The successor team and car were Ginn Racing's No. 14, which was sold to Dale Earnhardt, Inc. and merged into its No. 15 team, which in turn was folded after the merger that created Earnhardt Ganassi Racing; the resulting team, by 2014 was simply known as Chip Ganassi Racing, was in turn purchased by Trackhouse Racing Team in 2021.

=== Car No. 10 results ===
Year	Driver	No.	Make	1	2	3	4	5	6	7	8	9	10	11	12	13	14	15	16	17	18	19	20	21	22	23	24	25	26	27	28	29	30	31	32	33	34	Owners	Pts
1998	Darrell Waltrip	35	Chevy	DAY	CAR	LVS	ATL	DAR	BRI	TEX	MAR	TAL	CAL	CLT	DOV	RCH	MCH	POC	SON	NHA	POC	IND; 13	GLN; 25															41st	2180
1998	Darrell Waltrip	35	Pontiac																					MCH; 25	BRI; 27	NHA; 32	DAR; 38	RCH; 18	DOV; 21	MAR; 21	CLT; 22	TAL; 23	DAY; 28	PHO; 31	CAR; 32	ATL; 38		41st	2180
1999	Rich Bickle	45	Pontiac	DAY; 33	CAR; DNQ	LVS; 23	ATL; 30	DAR; DNQ	TEX; 12	BRI; DNQ	MAR; 11	TAL; 14	CAL; 32	RCH; 10	CLT; 25	DOV; 33	MCH; 24	POC; 24	SON; 21	DAY; 18	NHA; 14	POC; 7	IND; DNQ	GLN; 36	MCH; 28	BRI; DNQ	DAR; 23											35th	2723
1999	Jack Sprague	45	Pontiac																									RCH; DNQ										35th	2723
1999	David Green	45	Pontiac																										NHA; 40	DOV; 42	MAR; 36	CLT; 42	TAL; 17	CAR; 24	PHO; 12	HOM; 22	ATL; 21	35th	2723
2000	Johnny Benson Jr.	10	Pontiac	DAY; 12	CAR; 14	LVS; 6	ATL; DNQ	DAR; 24	BRI; 2	TEX; 42	MAR; 16	TAL; 13	CAL; 23	RCH; 25	CLT; 16	DOV; 15	MCH; 24	POC; 34	SON; 18	DAY; 13	NHA; 14	POC	IND	GLN	MCH	BRI	DAR	RCH	NHA	DOV	MAR	CLT	TAL	CAR	PHO	HOM	ATL	13th	3741

=== Car No. 17 results ===
Year	Driver	No.	Make	1	2	3	4	5	6	7	8	9	10	11	12	13	14	15	16	17	18	19	20	21	22	23	24	25	26	27	28	29	30	31	32	33	Owners	Pts
1998	Ron Hornaday Jr.	17	Chevy	DAY	CAR	LVS	ATL	DAR	BRI	TEX	MAR	TAL	CAL	CLT	DOV	RCH	MCH	POC	SON; 14	NHA	POC	IND	GLN	MCH	BRI	NHA	DAR	RCH	DOV	MAR	CLT	TAL	DAY	PHO	CAR	ATL	55th	121
