= 1999 Frontier at the Glen =

Race details
- Race 21 of 34 of in the 1999 NASCAR Winston Cup Series
- 1999 Frontier at the Glen program cover, featuring Dale Earnhardt, Jeff Gordon, and Mark Martin
- Date: August 15, 1999
- Location: Watkins Glen International, Watkins Glen, New York, U.S.
- Course: Permanent racing facility
- Course length: 2.450 miles (3.943 km)
- Distance: 90 laps, 220.50 mi (354.86 km)
- Weather: Mild with temperatures approaching 73.4°F (23°C); wind speeds up to 7.36 miles per hour (11.84 km/h)
- Average speed: 87.722 mph (141.175 km/h)

Pole position
Driver	Rusty Wallace	Penske-Kranefuss Racing
- Time: 1:12.752

Most laps led
Driver	Jeff Gordon	Hendrick Motorsports
- Laps: 55

Winner
No. 24	Jeff Gordon	Hendrick Motorsports

Television in the United States
- Network: ESPN
- Announcers: Bob Jenkins and Ned Jarrett

The layout of Watkins Glen International NASCAR uses.

The 1999 Frontier at the Glen was a NASCAR Winston Cup Series race held at Watkins Glen International, Watkins Glen, New York on August 15, 1999. It was the 21st points-paying event of the 1999 NASCAR Winston Cup Series season. Rusty Wallace won the pole, and Jeff Gordon won the race for the third consecutive year. A total of 49 cars attempted the race.

== Entry list ==
Car	Driver	Team	Manufacturer
1	Steve Park	Dale Earnhardt, Inc.	Chevrolet
2	Rusty Wallace	Penske-Kranefuss Racing	Ford
3	Dale Earnhardt	Richard Childress Racing	Chevrolet
4	Bobby Hamilton	Morgan-McClure Motorsports	Chevrolet
5	Terry Labonte	Hendrick Motorsports	Chevrolet
6	Mark Martin	Roush Racing	Ford
7	Michael Waltrip	Mattei Motorsports	Chevrolet
9	Jerry Nadeau	Melling Racing	Ford
10	Ricky Rudd	Rudd Performance Motorsports	Ford
11	Brett Bodine	Brett Bodine Racing	Ford
12	Jeremy Mayfield	Penske-Kranefuss Racing	Ford
13	Ted Christopher	Mystique Motorsports	Chevrolet
14	Boris Said	Irvan-Simo Motorsports	Ford
16	Kevin Lepage	Roush Racing	Ford
18	Bobby Labonte	Joe Gibbs Racing	Pontiac
19	Paul Gentilozzi	Roehig Motorsports	Pontiac
20	Tony Stewart	Joe Gibbs Racing	Toyota
21	Elliott Sadler	Wood Brothers Racing	Ford
22	Ward Burton	Bill Davis Racing	Pontiac
23	Jimmy Spencer	Haas-Carter Motorsports	Ford
24	Jeff Gordon	Hendrick Motorsports	Chevrolet
25	Wally Dallenbach Jr.	Hendrick Motorsports	Chevrolet
26	Johnny Benson Jr.	Roush Racing	Ford
28	Kenny Irwin Jr.	Robert Yates Racing	Ford
30	Derrike Cope	Eel River Racing	Pontiac
31	Mike Skinner	Richard Childress Racing	Chevrolet
33	Ken Schrader	Andy Petree Racing	Chevrolet
36	Ernie Irvan	MB2 Motorsports	Pontiac
40	Sterling Marlin	SABCO Racing	Chevrolet
41	David Green	Larry Hedrick Motorsports	Chevrolet
42	Joe Nemechek	SABCO Racing	Chevrolet
43	John Andretti	Petty Enterprises	Dodge
44	Kyle Petty	Petty Enterprises	Pontiac
45	Rich Bickle	Tyler Jet Motorsports	Pontiac
55	Kenny Wallace	Andy Petree Racing	Chevrolet
58	Hut Stricklin	SBIII Motorsports	Ford
60	Geoff Bodine	Joe Bessey Motorsports	Chevrolet
61	David Murry	Phoenix Air Racing	Ford
66	Darrell Waltrip	Haas-Carter Motorsports	Ford
71	Dave Marcis	Marcis Auto Racing	Chevrolet
75	Ted Musgrave	Butch Mock Motorsports	Ford
77	Robert Pressley	Jasper Motorsports	Ford
87	Ron Fellows	NEMCO Motorsports	Chevrolet
88	Dale Jarrett	Robert Yates Racing	Ford
91	Jack Baldwin	LJ Racing	Chevrolet
94	Bill Elliott	Bill Elliott Racing	Ford
97	Chad Little	Roush Racing	Ford
98	Rick Mast	Cale Yarborough Motorsports	Ford
99	Jeff Burton	Roush Racing	Ford

== Practice and qualifying ==
Practice and Kendall Pole Day, scheduled for Friday August 13, were both delayed for several hours due to inclement weather conditions. First-round qualifying would be held that day, allowing qualifying positions 1-25 to be locked into the field, but second-round qualifying would be rained out, forcing spots 25-36 to be locked in based on their first round qualifying speeds, and positions 37-43 were locked in based on owner points. Two drivers who failed to qualify, Jack Baldwin and Paul Gentilozzi made their only attempts at a Winston Cup event during this race. Rusty Wallace set a new track record with his pole-qualifying speed at 121.234 mph.

As was common with many road races, several road course ringers attempted to qualify. Two drivers, Boris Said and Ron Fellows, led their first Winston Cup laps during this race. Said, David Murry, and Ted Christopher made their first Winston Cup starts. Christopher also competed in the companion NASCAR Featherlite Modified Series and NASCAR Busch North Series races that weekend, winning and placing second respectively. In addition, full-time Winston Cup driver Jerry Nadeau, who began his career on road courses, led his first career laps in a Winston Cup race.

=== Full qualifying results ===
Pos.	Driver	Car	Manufacturer	Time	Avg. Speed
1	Rusty Wallace	2	Ford	1:12.752	121.234
2	Boris Said	14	Ford	1:12.944	120.915
3	Jeff Gordon	24	Chevrolet	1:13.115	120.632
4	Tony Stewart	20	Pontiac	1:13.352	120.242
5	Mark Martin	6	Ford	1:13.357	120.234
6	Jerry Nadeau	9	Ford	1:13.453	120.077
7	Ron Fellows	87	Chevrolet	1:13.489	120.018
8	Bill Elliott	94	Ford	1:13.515	119.976
9	Dale Jarrett	88	Ford	1:13.539	119.936
10	Terry Labonte	5	Chevrolet	1:13.602	119.834
11	Joe Nemechek	42	Chevrolet	1:13.646	119.762
12	Bobby Hamilton	4	Chevrolet	1:13.665	119.731
13	Jimmy Spencer	23	Ford	1:13.733	119.621
14	Dale Earnhardt	3	Chevrolet	1:13.747	119.598
15	Ward Burton	22	Pontiac	1:13.766	119.567
16	Darrell Waltrip	66	Ford	1:13.788	119.532
17	Mike Skinner	31	Chevrolet	1:13.866	119.405
18	John Andretti	43	Pontiac	1:13.873	119.394
19	Michael Waltrip	7	Chevrolet	1:13.927	119.307
20	Sterling Marlin	40	Chevrolet	1:13.985	119.213
21	Geoff Bodine	60	Chevrolet	1:14.032	119.138
22	Bobby Labonte	18	Pontiac	1:14.045	119.117
23	Kenny Wallace	55	Chevrolet	1:14.097	119.033
24	Ricky Rudd	10	Ford	1:14.198	118.871
25	Kyle Petty	44	Pontiac	1:14.274	118.749
26	Wally Dallenbach Jr.	25	Chevrolet	1:14.383	118.575
27	Jeff Burton	99	Ford	1:14.421	118.515
28	Rich Bickle	45	Pontiac	1:14.473	118.432
29	Kenny Irwin Jr.	28	Ford	1:14.482	118.418
30	Ken Schrader	33	Chevrolet	1:14.516	118.364
31	David Murry	61	Ford	1:14.525	118.350
32	David Green	41	Chevrolet	1:14.565	118.286
33	Ted Christopher	13	Chevrolet	1:14.590	118.246
34	Johnny Benson Jr.	26	Ford	1:14.714	118.050
35	Brett Bodine	11	Ford	1:14.762	117.974
36	Ernie Irvan	36	Pontiac	1:14.823	117.878
Provisionals
37	Jeremy Mayfield	12	Ford	1:23.389	105.769
38	Chad Little	97	Ford	1:15.481	116.851
39	Steve Park	1	Chevrolet	1:14.944	117.688
40	Kevin Lepage	16	Ford	1:15.452	116.896
41	Rick Mast	98	Ford	1:15.033	117.548
42	Elliott Sadler	21	Ford	1:14.843	117.847
43	Ted Musgrave	75	Ford	1:15.028	117.556
Failed to qualify
44	Robert Pressley	77	Ford	1:14.998	117.603
45	Derrike Cope	30	Pontiac	1:15.579	116.699
46	Paul Gentilozzi	19	Pontiac	1:15.579	116.699
47	Jack Baldwin	91	Chevrolet	1:15.649	116.591
48	Hut Stricklin	58	Ford	1:16.716	114.969
49	Dave Marcis	71	Chevrolet	1:18.299	112.645

== Race recap ==
The only drivers who failed to finish underwent mechanical failures. During the race, there were four caution flags for cars (#11, #36, #40, and #45) off the track in the inner loop at separate times, for oil on the race track, and for the #26 car wrecking. 16.7 percent of the race's 90 laps were spent under caution.

1991 winner Ernie Irvan made his final NASCAR Winston Cup start in this race. Irvan suffered career-ending head injuries while practicing his Busch Series car at Michigan International Speedway the following week. David Murry's lone career start came in this race. This race was also the last win for Ray Evernham as crew chief. He left Jeff Gordon's team several weeks later to start his own Winston Cup team.

ESPN carried the coverage for the race. Regular color commentator Benny Parsons missed the race due to a recent operation, however called the telecast in the middle of the race to talk to fellow commentators and viewers.

When the race began to come to a close, the race came down to Jeff Gordon and Canadian road course ringer Ron Fellows. Ron Fellows, in a one-time drive in the #87 NEMCO Motorsports Chevy, led 3 laps late in the race and got passed by Gordon with less than 30 laps to go. Fellows remained in second for several laps and ultimately had one shot at the lead on a restart with 2 laps to go. Fellows tried to pass Gordon in turn 1, but Gordon held off the challenge, pulling away to win the race by 5 car-lengths. Gordon praised Fellows for a fun race in victory lane. It was Fellows' first of 2 runner-up finishes in the Cup series race at Watkins Glen.

Ron Fellows was not the only road course ringer in the race. Boris Said started 2nd in the race and led some laps early in the race in the #14 car owned by Mark Simo. However, Said's day came to an end on lap 48 with a blown engine.

Coming off a win at the Brickyard 400, Dale Jarrett finished fourth to gain twenty-four points on his points lead over Mark Martin. His points lead was at 300 points at the end of the race.

== Race results ==
Fin	St	#	Driver	Make	Team	Laps	Led	Status	Pts	Winnings
1	3	24	Jeff Gordon	Chevrolet	Hendrick Motorsports	90	55	running	185	119860
2	7	87	Ron Fellows	Chevrolet	NEMCO Motorsports	90	3	running	175	67270
3	1	2	Rusty Wallace	Ford	Penske-Kranefuss Racing	90	9	running	170	64460
4	9	88	Dale Jarrett	Ford	Robert Yates Racing	90	0	running	160	59900
5	6	9	Jerry Nadeau	Ford	Melling Racing	90	9	running	160	53120
6	4	20	Tony Stewart	Pontiac	Joe Gibbs Racing	90	0	running	150	45240
7	26	25	Wally Dallenbach Jr.	Chevrolet	Hendrick Motorsports	90	2	running	151	39785
8	25	44	Kyle Petty	Pontiac	Petty Enterprises	90	0	running	142	35610
9	17	31	Mike Skinner	Chevrolet	Richard Childress Racing	90	0	running	138	37630
10	5	6	Mark Martin	Ford	Roush Racing	90	0	running	134	51040
11	10	5	Terry Labonte	Chevrolet	Hendrick Motorsports	90	0	running	130	42945
12	39	1	Steve Park	Chevrolet	Dale Earnhardt, Inc.	90	0	running	127	36265
13	27	99	Jeff Burton	Ford	Roush Racing	90	0	running	124	41775
14	38	97	Chad Little	Ford	Roush Racing	90	0	running	121	38410
15	16	66	Darrell Waltrip	Ford	Haas-Carter Motorsports	90	0	running	118	30835
16	13	23	Jimmy Spencer	Ford	Haas-Carter Motorsports	90	0	running	115	35950
17	30	33	Ken Schrader	Chevrolet	Andy Petree Racing	90	0	running	112	34505
18	42	21	Elliott Sadler	Ford	Wood Brothers Racing	90	0	running	109	34860
19	23	55	Kenny Wallace	Chevrolet	Andy Petree Racing	90	0	running	106	27480
20	14	3	Dale Earnhardt	Chevrolet	Richard Childress Racing	90	0	running	103	41525
21	19	7	Michael Waltrip	Chevrolet	Mattei Motorsports	90	1	running	105	33630
22	12	4	Bobby Hamilton	Chevrolet	Morgan-McClure Motorsports	90	2	running	102	38100
23	41	98	Rick Mast	Ford	Cale Yarborough Motorsports	90	0	running	94	26270
24	22	18	Bobby Labonte	Pontiac	Joe Gibbs Racing	90	0	running	91	39300
25	40	16	Kevin Lepage	Ford	Roush Racing	90	0	running	88	33855
26	29	28	Kenny Irwin Jr.	Ford	Robert Yates Racing	90	0	running	85	33260
27	43	75	Ted Musgrave	Ford	Butch Mock Motorsports	90	0	running	82	25940
28	8	94	Bill Elliott	Ford	Bill Elliott Racing	90	0	running	79	32570
29	18	43	John Andretti	Pontiac	Petty Enterprises	90	0	running	76	37500
30	11	42	Joe Nemechek	Chevrolet	SABCO Racing	89	0	running	73	32150
31	33	13	Ted Christopher	Chevrolet	Mystique Motorsports	89	0	running	70	22360
32	24	10	Ricky Rudd	Ford	Rudd Performance Motorsports	89	0	running	67	29285
33	20	40	Sterling Marlin	Chevrolet	SABCO Racing	89	0	running	64	29225
34	37	12	Jeremy Mayfield	Ford	Penske-Kranefuss Racing	89	0	running	61	37190
35	21	60	Geoff Bodine	Chevrolet	Joe Bessey Motorsports	89	0	running	58	22155
36	28	45	Rich Bickle	Pontiac	Tyler Jet Motorsports	88	0	running	55	22095
37	32	41	David Green	Chevrolet	Larry Hedrick Motorsports	88	0	running	52	22060
38	34	26	Johnny Benson Jr.	Ford	Roush Racing	85	0	running	49	29000
39	31	61	David Murry	Ford	Phoenix Air Racing	78	0	running	46	21965
40	35	11	Brett Bodine	Ford	Brett Bodine Racing	66	0	running	43	28930
41	36	36	Ernie Irvan	Pontiac	MB2 Motorsports	60	0	engine	40	28895
42	2	14	Boris Said	Ford	Irvan-Simo Motorsports	48	9	engine	42	25660
43	15	22	Ward Burton	Pontiac	Bill Davis Racing	48	0	engine	34	28825
Failed to Qualify
44		77	Robert Pressley	Ford	Jasper Motorsports					
45		30	Derrike Cope	Pontiac	Eel River Racing					
46		19	Paul Gentilozzi (R)	Pontiac	Roehig Motorsports					
47		91	Jack Baldwin (R)	Chevrolet	LJ Racing					
48		58	Hut Stricklin	Ford	SBIII Motorsports					
49		71	Dave Marcis	Chevrolet	Marcis Auto Racing					

Preceded by 1999 Brickyard 400	NASCAR Winston Cup Series season 1999	Succeeded by 1999 Pepsi 400 Presented by Meijer
