= David Green (racing driver) =

American racing driver (born 1958)

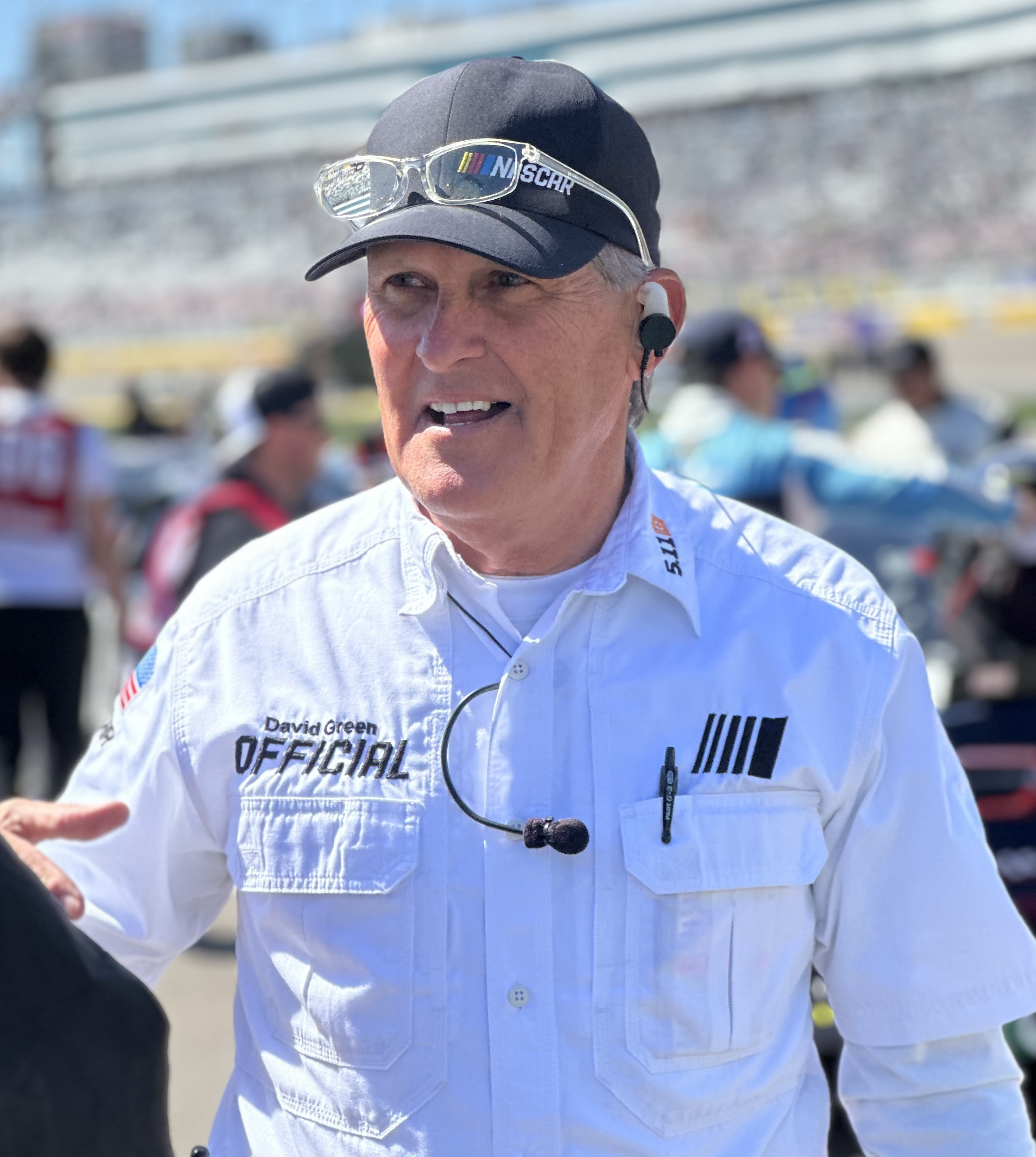
- Green in 2025
- Born: David Allen Green; January 28, 1958 (age 68); Owensboro, Kentucky, U.S.
- Achievements: 1994 Busch Series Champion
- Awards: 1996 Busch Series Most Popular Driver

NASCAR Cup Series career
- 78 races run over 6 years
- Best finish: 36th (1999)
- First race: 1997 Goodwrench Service 400 (Rockingham)
- Last race: 2004 Chevy Rock and Roll 400 (Richmond)
Wins	Top tens	Poles
0	0	1

NASCAR O'Reilly Auto Parts Series career
- 404 races run over 23 years
- 2013 position: 87th
- Best finish: 1st (1994)
- First race: 1989 Pepsi 200 (Hickory)
- Last race: 2013 Indiana 250 (Indianapolis)
- First win: 1991 Nestle 200 (Lanier)
- Last win: 2005 Salute to the Troops 250 (Pikes Peak)
Wins	Top tens	Poles
9	144	22

NASCAR FedEx Freight Truck Series career
- 11 races run over 4 years
- Best finish: 37th (2007)
- First race: 1995 GM Goodwrench/Delco Battery 200 (Phoenix)
- Last race: 2007 Smith's Las Vegas 350 (Las Vegas)
Wins	Top tens	Poles
0	3	0
- Statistics up to date as of November 16, 2013.

David Allen Green (born January 28, 1958) is an American former professional stock car racing driver, who currently works as a NASCAR official. While driving, he won the 1994 NASCAR Busch Series championship. His two younger brothers, Mark and Jeff have also competed in the NASCAR circuit, and his son, Austin, currently races in the Trans-Am Series and the NASCAR Xfinity Series.

== Early Busch career ==
Green, born in Owensboro, Kentucky, made his debut in 1989 at Hickory Motor Speedway for Day Enterprise Racing, starting fifteenth but finishing 30th after suffering an engine failure. He ran two more races the next year, suffering transmission failure in both races. In 1991, Green signed up with FILMAR Racing to drive the No. 8, and made an immediate impact, winning the pole position at the season-opening Goody's 300. Despite failing to qualify for two of the first seven races, Green won in just his 12th start at Lanier Raceway. He would finish second to Jeff Gordon for Rookie of the Year. Surprisingly, Green was fired from the ride, and spent the 1992 season working as a member of Bobby Labonte's pit crew. When Labonte moved to Winston Cup in 1993, Green took over the team's No. 44 ride. Although he did not win, he finished in the top-ten 16 times and finished third in the points. The next year, he won the Goody's 250, nine poles, as well as the Busch Series championship. Green stayed with Labonte Racing and won four more poles in 1995, but dropped to 12th in points.

== Winston Cup ==
After the 1995 season, Green was offered a contract from Buzz McCall, owner of the new American Equipment Racing team. Running the No. 95, Green returned to his former dominance, winning twice and finishing second to Randy LaJoie in the championship chase. At the end of the season, McCall and Green elevated their operation to Winston Cup, this time as the No. 96 driver. Unfortunately, they were not able to duplicate their success, as Green failed to qualify for six races, and could only manage a best finish of 16th at the Coca-Cola 600. Despite this, he still finished runner-up to Mike Skinner for Rookie of the Year. Meanwhile, Green also served as a fill-in driver for Dale Earnhardt at Watkins Glen International in the event Earnhardt could not continue running after suffering injuries in a crash at Talladega Superspeedway. However, Earnhardt ran the full distance, and Green did not need to step in. After he could not manage a higher finish than seventeenth at Talladega Superspeedway in 1998, Green was fired from the No. 96. Green returned to the Busch Series to drive the No. 36 Pontiac Grand Prix for Team 34. He drove for the rest of the year, and finished in the top-five in his first six races for the team. Late in the season, he received a call from Larry Hedrick Motorsports, who had been struggling following the release of Steve Grissom from their No. 41 Chevy. Green would run four races for Hedrick for the rest of the year, and signed to drive for them in 1999. In addition, he would run the No. 41 car in the Busch Series for Hedrick on a limited schedule. Still, Green continued to struggle, but had the lowest DNQ count (two) in his career.

As the season began to close, Green signed on for the rest of the season with Tyler Jet Motorsports, and enjoyed the best performance of his career, finishing a career-best t12th at Phoenix International Raceway, then won the pole the next race at the inaugural Pennzoil 400. Green did well in the Busch Series, running seventeen races and having seven top-tens and a pole position. He ran the Bud Shootout in 2000 in a car owned by Jackie Joyner-Kersee, and hoped to run the Daytona 500, but sponsorship problems forced that deal to fall through. Green would fill in for an injured Bill Elliott for two races later on that season, with a best finish of 25th.

== Current run ==
In 2000, Green returned to Team 34. That year, he had eleven top-ten finishes, and then six more the following year. At the end of that season, Green was left without a permanent ride. After a few part-time rides, Green finished out the season with Hendrick Motorsports, replacing Ricky Hendrick in the No. 5. That performance gave Green a brief return to Cup, running two races in Hendrick's R&D car. During the season, he also worked in Winston Cup as a spotter for Dale Jarrett.

In 2003, Green signed with Brewco Motorsports, and returned to his winning form, as he visited victory lane three times (his win at Kansas that year would be Pontiac's last win in the top two divisions of NASCAR), and finishing second in points. He would not win in 2004, but he did run another Cup race at Richmond for Brewco, finishing 31st. In 2005, Green won at Pikes Peak and had an eighth-place finish in points. After failing to finish in the top-five during the 2006, Green was released from Brewco in the closing part of the season. He drove for Riley D'Hondt Motorsports in a part-time schedule in 2007, making three starts with a best finish of eleventh. He also drove seven races in the 2007 season for Red Horse Racing in the Craftsman Truck Series, finishing fifth at Kentucky Speedway. He spent 2008 as a test driver for JR Motorsports, and ran the final race of the season in the No. 0 JD Motorsports Chevy. He signed up to drive the new No. 07 SK Motorsports team in 2009 full-time, but was released after several races. Green made one start in 2010 driving the No. 49 Chevy at Phoenix. In 2011, Green became the spotter for Bobby Labonte. He was also the spotter for Johanna Long in the Nationwide Series. Green now works for NASCAR as an official.

== Motorsports career results ==
=== NASCAR ===
(key) (Bold – Pole position awarded by qualifying time. Italics – Pole position earned by points standings or practice time. * – Most laps led.)

==== Nextel Cup Series ====
NASCAR Cup Series results
Year	Team	No.	Make	1	2	3	4	5	6	7	8	9	10	11	12	13	14	15	16	17	18	19	20	21	22	23	24	25	26	27	28	29	30	31	32	33	34	35	36	NNCC	Pts	Ref
1997	American Equipment Racing	96	Chevy	DAY; DNQ	CAR; 38	RCH; 33	ATL; 24	DAR; 41	TEX; DNQ	BRI; 22	MAR; DNQ	SON; DNQ	TAL; 38	CLT; 16	DOV; 18	POC; 28	MCH; 28	CAL; 25	DAY; 19	NHA; 24	POC; 39	IND; 35	GLN; 22	MCH; 20	BRI; 39	DAR	RCH; 37	NHA; 40	DOV; 25	MAR; 20	CLT; 31	TAL; 16	CAR; 27	PHO; 29	ATL; DNQ					37th	2038	
1998	American Equipment Racing	96	Chevy	DAY; DNQ	CAR; 42	LVS; 34	ATL; 30	DAR; 26	BRI; 21	TEX; 18	MAR; 43	TAL; 17	CAL; 18	CLT; 43	DOV; 38	RCH; QL^{†}	MCH	POC	SON	NHA	POC	IND	GLN	MCH	BRI	NHA	DAR	RCH	DOV											44th	1014	
1998	Larry Hedrick Motorsports	41	Chevy																											MAR; DNQ	CLT; 43	TAL	DAY	PHO; 37	CAR; 26	ATL; 41				44th	1014	
1999	Larry Hedrick Motorsports	41	Chevy	DAY; DNQ	CAR; 18	LVS; 27	ATL; 21	DAR; 42	TEX; 26	BRI; 33	MAR; 26	TAL; 33	CAL; 25	RCH; 43	CLT; 27	DOV; 18	MCH; 35	POC; 38	SON; 36	DAY; 33	NHA; DNQ	POC; 41	IND; 20	GLN; 37	MCH; 32	BRI; 25	DAR; 42	RCH; 33												36th	2320	
1999	Tyler Jet Motorsports	45	Pontiac																										NHA; 40	DOV; 42	MAR; 36	CLT; 42	TAL; 17	CAR; 24	PHO; 12	**HOM**; 22	ATL; 21			36th	2320	
2000	JKR Motorsports	34	Chevy	DAY; Wth	CAR	LVS	ATL	DAR	BRI	TEX	MAR	TAL	CAL	RCH	CLT	DOV	MCH	POC	SON	DAY	NHA	POC	IND	GLN	MCH															59th	143	
2000	Bill Elliott Racing	94	Ford																							BRI; 36	DAR; 25	RCH	NHA	DOV	MAR	CLT	TAL	CAR	PHO	HOM	ATL			59th	143	
2002	BH Motorsports	54	Chevy	DAY	CAR	LVS	ATL	DAR	BRI	TEX	MAR	TAL	CAL	RCH	CLT	DOV	POC	MCH	SON	DAY	CHI	NHA	POC	IND	GLN	MCH	BRI	DAR	RCH	NHA	DOV	KAN	TAL	CLT	MAR	ATL	CAR	PHO	HOM; DNQ	NA	-	
2003	Hendrick Motorsports	60	Chevy	DAY; DNQ	CAR	LVS	ATL	DAR	BRI	TEX	TAL; DNQ	MAR	CAL	RCH	CLT	DOV	POC	MCH	SON	DAY; 32	CHI	NHA	POC	IND	GLN	MCH	BRI	DAR	RCH	NHA	DOV	TAL; 35	KAN	CLT	MAR	ATL	PHO	CAR	HOM	60th	125	
2004	Brewco Motorsports	27	Chevy	DAY	CAR	LVS	ATL	DAR	BRI	TEX	MAR	TAL	CAL	RCH	CLT	DOV	POC	MCH	SON	DAY	CHI	NHA	POC	IND	GLN	MCH	BRI	CAL	RCH; 31	NHA	DOV	TAL	KAN	CLT	MAR	ATL	PHO	DAR	HOM	82nd	70	
^{†} - Replaced by Kevin Lepage

===== Daytona 500 =====
Year	Team	Manufacturer	Start	Finish
1997	American Equipment Racing	Chevrolet	DNQ	
1998	American Equipment Racing	Chevrolet	DNQ	
1999	Larry Hedrick Motorsports	Chevrolet	DNQ	
2000	JKR Motorsports	Chevrolet	Wth	
2003	Hendrick Motorsports	Chevrolet	DNQ	

==== Nationwide Series ====
NASCAR Nationwide Series results
Year	Team	No.	Make	1	2	3	4	5	6	7	8	9	10	11	12	13	14	15	16	17	18	19	20	21	22	23	24	25	26	27	28	29	30	31	32	33	34	35	NNSC	Pts	Ref
1989	Day Enterprise Racing	16	Olds	DAY	CAR	MAR	HCY	DAR	BRI	NZH	SBO	LAN	NSV	CLT	DOV	ROU	LVL	VOL	MYB	SBO	HCY; 30	DUB	IRP	ROU	BRI	DAR	RCH	DOV	MAR	CLT	CAR	MAR							98th	-	
1990	Day Enterprise Racing	16	Olds	DAY	RCH	CAR	MAR	HCY; 29	DAR	BRI	LAN	SBO	NZH	HCY	CLT	DOV	ROU	VOL	MYB	OXF	NHA	SBO	DUB	IRP	ROU	BRI	DAR	RCH; 33	DOV	MAR	CLT	NHA	CAR	MAR					81st	140	
1991	FILMAR Racing	8	Olds	**DAY**; 30	RCH; DNQ	CAR; 13	MAR; DNQ	VOL; 5	HCY; DNQ	DAR; 23	BRI; 2	LAN; 1*	SBO; 17	NZH; 4	CLT; 37	DOV; 14	ROU; 3	HCY; 14	MYB; 9	GLN; 10	OXF; 17	NHA; 8	SBO; 12	DUB; 4	IRP; 23	ROU; 12	BRI; 13	DAR; 30	RCH; 26	DOV; 11	CLT; 27	NHA; 29	CAR; 22	MAR; 25					13th	3389	
1991	Linville Racing	62	Chevy				MAR; 30																																13th	3389	
1993	Labonte Motorsports	44	Chevy	DAY; 8	CAR; 5	RCH; 4	DAR; 6	BRI; 8	HCY; 6	ROU; 14	MAR; 6	NZH; 4	CLT; 16	DOV; 11	MYB; 8	GLN; 35	MLW; 4	TAL; 24	IRP; 2	MCH; 18	NHA; 9	BRI; 29	DAR; 12	RCH; 7	DOV; 5	ROU; 6	CLT; 17	MAR; 6	CAR; 38	HCY; 17	ATL; 33								3rd	3584	
1994	Labonte Motorsports	44	Chevy	DAY; 38	CAR; 19	**RCH**; 16	ATL; 19	**MAR**; 2	DAR; 12	**HCY**; 3	BRI; 1	ROU; 26	NHA; 6	NZH; 4	CLT; 24	DOV; 15	MYB; 6	GLN; 4	**MLW**; 2	**SBO**; 4	TAL; 13	**HCY**; 3	**IRP**; 7	MCH; 27	BRI; 3	DAR; 14	RCH; 8	DOV; 16	CLT; 19	**MAR**; 2	**CAR**; 12								1st	3725	
1995	Labonte Motorsports	44	Chevy	DAY; 14	**CAR**; 33	RCH; 12	ATL; 40	NSV; 1*	DAR; 31	**BRI**; 36	**HCY**; 18	NHA; 11	**NZH**; 5	CLT; 38	DOV; 19	MYB; 34	GLN; 32	MLW; 17	TAL; 19	SBO; 3	IRP; 28	MCH; 24	BRI; 6	DAR; 32	RCH; 7	DOV; 14	CLT; 19	CAR; 5	HOM; 28										12th	2714	
1996	American Equipment Racing	95	Chevy	DAY; 12	CAR; 6	RCH; 3	ATL; 2	NSV; 2	DAR; 14	BRI; 7	**HCY**; 1*	**NZH**; 2*	CLT; 19	DOV; 4	SBO; 20	**MYB**; 1*	**GLN**; 5	MLW; 32	NHA; 3	TAL; 10	IRP; 3	MCH; 7	BRI; 11	DAR; 4	RCH; 2	DOV; 18	CLT; 40	CAR; 5	HOM; 9										2nd	3685	
1998	Martin Racing	92	Chevy	DAY	CAR	LVS	NSV; 43	DAR; 39	BRI	TEX	HCY	TAL; 42	NHA	NZH	CLT	DOV	RCH	PPR																					26th	2180	
1998	Team 34	36	Pontiac																GLN; 4	MLW; 4	MYB; 2	CAL; 5	SBO; 4	IRP; 5	MCH; 23	BRI; 10	DAR; 11	RCH; 11	DOV; 40	CLT; 21	GTY; 19	CAR; 21	ATL; 19	HOM; 5					26th	2180	
1999	Larry Hedrick Motorsports	41	Chevy	DAY	CAR; DNQ	LVS; 22	ATL	DAR; 7	TEX; 22	NSV	BRI; 33	TAL; 10	CAL; 14	NHA	RCH; 16	NZH	**CLT**; 14	DOV; 4	SBO	GLN	MLW	MYB	PPR	GTY	IRP	MCH; 14	BRI; 19	DAR; 40	RCH; 7		CLT; 18	CAR; 9	MEM	PHO	HOM; 7				27th	2010	
1999	Larry Hedrick Motorsports	46	Chevy																											DOV; 7									27th	2010	
2000	Cicci-Welliver Racing	34	Chevy	DAY; 11	CAR; 36	LVS; 19	ATL; 6	DAR; 7	BRI; 6	TEX; 3	NSV; 8	TAL; 40	CAL; 40	RCH; 18	NHA; 8	CLT; 13	DOV; 24	SBO; 22	MYB; 25	GLN; 44	MLW; 30	NZH; 18	PPR; 2	GTY; 26	IRP; 9	MCH; 33	BRI; 10	DAR; 24	RCH; 10	DOV; 37	CLT; 37	CAR; 27	MEM; 41	PHO; 9	HOM; 17				9th	3316	
2001	Cicci-Welliver Racing	34	Chevy	DAY; 23	CAR; 28	LVS; 40	ATL; 18	DAR; 31	BRI; 15	TEX; 6	NSH; 24	TAL; 32	CAL; 13	RCH; 13	NHA; 23	NZH; 16	CLT; 9	DOV; 8	KEN; 23	MLW; 15	GLN; 35	CHI; 15	GTY; 7	PPR; 6	IRP; 18	MCH; 37	BRI; 15	DAR; 22	RCH; 12	DOV; 15	KAN; 13	CLT; 21	MEM; 33	PHO; 15	CAR; 6	HOM; 11			13th	3554	
2002	Tommy Baldwin Racing	6	Dodge	DAY; 18	CAR	LVS	DAR	BRI	TEX	NSH	TAL	CAL	RCH																										40th	1257	
2002	Marsh Racing	31	Chevy											NHA; 33	NZH		DOV; 38		KEN; 42	MLW	DAY																		40th	1257	
2002	Hispanic Racing Team	09	Chevy													CLT; 14						CHI; 19																	40th	1257	
2002	ST Motorsports	59	Chevy															NSH; QL^{†}					GTY; QL^{†}	PPR	IRP	MCH	BRI	DAR	RCH	DOV	KAN								40th	1257	
2002	Hendrick Motorsports	5	Chevy																													CLT; 5	MEM; 9	ATL; 14	CAR; 4	PHO; 5	HOM; 42		40th	1257	
2003	Brewco Motorsports	37	Pontiac	DAY; 18	**CAR**; 2	LVS; 6	DAR; 31	**BRI**; 4	TEX; 29	TAL; 16	NSH; 1	CAL; 9	RCH; 9	GTY; 2	NZH; 4	CLT; 37	DOV; 3	NSH; 2	KEN; 8	MLW; 6	DAY; 20	CHI; 11	NHA; 1	PPR; 12	IRP; 6	MCH; 4	BRI; 17	DAR; 14	RCH; 5	DOV; 31	KAN; 1	CLT; 6	MEM; 19	ATL; 8	PHO; 16	CAR; 10	HOM; 9		2nd	4623	
2004	Brewco Motorsports	37	Pontiac	DAY; 10	CAR; 5	LVS; 11	DAR; 3	BRI; 5	TEX; 8				GTY; 11	RCH; 6	NZH; 3	CLT; 23		NSH; 34		MLW; 8			NHA; 21			MCH; 32		CAL; 15	RCH; 14				MEM; 24		PHO; 16				7th	4082	
2004	Brewco Motorsports	37	Chevy							NSH; 10	TAL; 9	CAL; 25					**DOV**; 3		KEN; 13		DAY; 34	CHI; 8		PPR; 8	IRP; 10		BRI; 5			DOV; 10	KAN; 35	CLT; 13		ATL; 16		DAR; 29	HOM; 42		7th	4082	
2005	Brewco Motorsports	27	Ford	DAY; 22	CAL; 14	MXC; 39	LVS; 10	ATL; 33	NSH; 18	BRI; 15	TEX; 11	PHO; 14	TAL; 13	DAR; 15	RCH; 14	CLT; 31	DOV; 11	NSH; 33	KEN; 12	MLW; 11	DAY; 12	CHI; 30	NHA; 20	PPR; 1	GTY; 4	IRP; 8	GLN; 22	MCH; 21	BRI; 27	CAL; 18	RCH; 18	DOV; 32	KAN; 15	CLT; 38	MEM; 4	TEX; 15	PHO; 12	HOM; 9	8th	3908	
2006	Brewco Motorsports	27	Ford	DAY; 37	CAL; 20	MXC; 35	LVS; 29	ATL; 36	BRI; 25	TEX; 16	NSH; 29	PHO; 9	TAL; 24	RCH; 12	DAR; 24	CLT; 14	DOV; 17	NSH; 21	KEN; 21	MLW; 17	DAY; 23	CHI; 22	NHA; 22	MAR; 31	GTY; 7	IRP; 28	GLN; 15	MCH; 32	BRI; 21	CAL; 26	RCH	DOV	KAN	CLT	MEM	TEX	PHO	HOM	23rd	2573	
2007	Riley D'Hondt Motorsports	91	Toyota	DAY	CAL	MXC	LVS	ATL	BRI	NSH	TEX	PHO	TAL	RCH	DAR	CLT; 28	DOV	NSH; 11	KEN; 26	MLW	NHA	DAY	CHI	GTY	IRP	CGV	GLN	MCH	BRI	CAL	RCH	DOV	KAN	CLT	MEM	TEX	PHO	HOM	92nd	294	
2008	JR Motorsports	5	Chevy	DAY	CAL	LVS	ATL	BRI	NSH	TEX	PHO	MXC; QL^{‡}	TAL	RCH	DAR	CLT	DOV	NSH	KEN	MLW	NHA	DAY	CHI	GTY	IRP	CGV	GLN	MCH	BRI	CAL	RCH	DOV	KAN	CLT	MEM	TEX	PHO		126th	76	
2008	JD Motorsports	0	Chevy																																			HOM; 29	126th	76	
2009	SK Motorsports	07	Toyota	DAY; 30	CAL; 18	LVS; 31	BRI; 17	TEX; 30	NSH; 38	PHO; 18	TAL; 24	RCH; 14	DAR	CLT	DOV	NSH	KEN	MLW	NHA	DAY	CHI	GTY	IRP	IOW	GLN	MCH	BRI	CGV	ATL	RCH	DOV	KAN	CAL	CLT	MEM	TEX	PHO	HOM	55th	807	
2010	Jay Robinson Racing	49	Chevy	DAY	CAL	LVS	BRI	NSH	PHO	TEX	TAL	RCH	DAR	DOV	CLT	NSH	KEN	ROA	NHA	DAY	CHI	GTY	IRP	IOW	GLN	MCH	BRI	CGV	ATL	RCH	DOV	KAN	CAL	CLT	GTY	TEX	PHO; 36	HOM	138th	55	
2011	Jay Robinson Racing	49	Chevy	DAY	PHO	LVS	BRI	CAL	TEX	TAL	NSH	RCH	DAR; 42	DOV	IOW	CLT; 41	CHI	MCH	ROA	DAY	KEN																		78th	14	
2011	Jay Robinson Racing	23	Chevy																			NHA; 33	NSH	IRP	IOW	GLN	CGV	BRI	ATL	RCH	CHI	DOV	KAN	CLT	TEX	PHO	HOM		78th	14	
2012	Robinson-Blakeney Racing	28	Dodge	DAY	PHO; 35	LVS	BRI																																75th	27	
2012	Robinson-Blakeney Racing	70	Dodge					CAL; 31	TEX	RCH	TAL	DAR	IOW	CLT	DOV	MCH	ROA	KEN	DAY	NHA	CHI	IND	IOW	GLN	CGV	BRI	ATL	RCH	CHI	KEN	DOV								75th	27	
2012	Mike Harmon Racing	74	Chevy																													CLT; 39	KAN	TEX	PHO	HOM			75th	27	
2013	SR² Motorsports	00	Toyota	DAY	PHO	LVS	BRI	CAL	TEX	RCH	TAL	DAR	CLT	DOV	IOW	MCH	ROA	KEN	DAY	NHA	CHI	IND; 38	IOW	GLN	MOH	BRI	ATL	RCH	CHI	KEN	DOV	KAN	CLT	TEX	PHO	HOM			87th	6	
^{†} - Qualified for Stacy Compton · ^{‡} - Qualified for Adrián Fernández

==== Craftsman Truck Series ====
NASCAR Craftsman Truck Series results
Year	Team	No.	Make	1	2	3	4	5	6	7	8	9	10	11	12	13	14	15	16	17	18	19	20	21	22	23	24	25	26	NCTC	Pts	Ref
1995	Dale Earnhardt, Inc.	76	Chevy	PHO	TUS	SGS	MMR	POR	EVG	I70	LVL	BRI	MLW	CNS	HPT	IRP	FLM	RCH	MAR	NWS	SON	MMR	PHO; 9							74th	138	
1996	Roehrig Motorsports	18	Chevy	HOM	PHO	POR	EVG	TUS	CNS	HPT	BRI	NZH	MLW	LVL	I70	IRP; 34	FLM	GLN	NSV	RCH	NHA	MAR	NWS	SON	MMR	PHO	LVS			127th	61	
1997	Brewco Motorsports	37	Chevy	WDW	TUS	HOM	PHO	POR	EVG	I70	NHA	TEX	BRI	NZH; 8	MLW	LVL	CNS	HPT	IRP	FLM	NSV	GLN	RCH	MAR; 12	SON	MMR	CAL	PHO	LVS	68th	266	
2007	Red Horse Racing	1	Toyota	DAY	CAL	ATL	MAR	KAN	CLT	MFD	DOV	TEX	MCH	MLW	MEM	KEN; 5	IRP; 15	NSH; 14	BRI; 16	GTW; 20	NHA; 19	LVS; 18	TAL	MAR	ATL	TEX	PHO	HOM		37th	832	

=== ARCA SuperCar Series ===
(key) (Bold – Pole position awarded by qualifying time. Italics – Pole position earned by points standings or practice time. * – Most laps led.)

ARCA SuperCar Series results
Year	Team	No.	Make	1	2	3	4	5	6	7	8	9	10	11	12	13	14	15	16	17	18	19	20	21	ASCC	Pts	Ref
1992	Roulo Brothers Racing	39	Chevy	DAY	FIF	TWS	TAL	TOL	KIL	POC	MCH	FRS	KIL	NSH; 1*	DEL	POC	HPT	FRS	ISF	TOL	DSF	TWS	SLM	ATL	128th	-	

Sporting positions
Preceded by Steve Grissom	NASCAR Busch Series Champion; 1994	Succeeded by Johnny Benson Jr.
