= 1999 Brickyard 400 =

Race details
- Race 20 of 34 in the 1999 NASCAR Winston Cup Series
- 1999 Brickyard 400 program cover
- Date: August 7, 1999
- Official name: Brickyard 400
- Location: Indianapolis Motor Speedway in Speedway, Indiana
- Course: Permanent racing facility
- Course length: 2.5 miles (4.023 km)
- Distance: 160 laps, 400 mi (643.738 km)
- Average speed: 148.194 miles per hour (238.495 km/h)

Pole position
Driver	Jeff Gordon	Hendrick Motorsports
- Time: 50.108

Most laps led
Driver	Dale Jarrett	Robert Yates Racing
- Laps: 117

Winner
No. 88	Dale Jarrett	Robert Yates Racing

Television in the United States
- Network: ABC
- Announcers: Bob Jenkins and Benny Parsons
- Nielsen ratings: 4.6/15

The 1999 Brickyard 400, the 6th running of the event, was a NASCAR Winston Cup Series race held on August 7, 1999, at Indianapolis Motor Speedway in Speedway, Indiana. Contested over 160 laps on the 2.5-mile (4.0-kilometre) speedway, it was the 20th race of the 1999 NASCAR Winston Cup Series season. Dale Jarrett of Robert Yates Racing won the race.

== Background ==
The Indianapolis Motor Speedway, located in Speedway, Indiana, (an enclave suburb of Indianapolis) in the United States, is the home of the Indianapolis 500 and the Brickyard 400. It is located on the corner of 16th Street and Georgetown Road, approximately 6 miles (9.7 kilometres) west of Downtown Indianapolis. It is a four-turn rectangular-oval track that is 2.5 miles (4.0 kilometres) long. The track's turns are banked at 9 degrees, while the front stretch, the location of the finish line, has no banking. The back stretch, opposite of the front, also has a zero degree banking. The racetrack has seats for more than 250,000 spectators. Jeff Gordon was the race's defending champion.

== Summary ==
Late in the race, Dale Jarrett held the lead, but fourth-place Bobby Labonte was the only car in the top five that could go to the end of the race without pitting for fuel. A caution came out with 17 laps to go, allowing the leaders to pit, foiling Labonte's chances of victory. As the leaders pitted, in an unexpected move, Jarrett took on only two tires. Jeff Burton saw this and pulled away after taking only two tires on the right-hand side. His pit crew, however, had already tried to loosen the lug nuts on the left side. Jarrett led the rest of the way, becoming the second two-time winner of the race.

== Results ==
Pos	SP	No.	Driver	Car make	Entrant	Sponsor	Laps	Status
1	4	88	Dale Jarrett	Ford	Robert Yates Racing	Quality Care / Ford Credit	160	Running
2	7	18	Bobby Labonte	Pontiac	Joe Gibbs Racing	Interstate Batteries	160	Running
3	1	24	Jeff Gordon	Chevrolet	Hendrick Motorsports	DuPont	160	Running
4	2	6	Mark Martin	Ford	Roush Racing	Valvoline / Cummins	160	Running
5	16	99	Jeff Burton	Ford	Roush Racing	Exide	160	Running
6	12	22	Ward Burton	Pontiac	Bill Davis Racing	Caterpillar	160	Running
7	11	20	Tony Stewart	Pontiac	Joe Gibbs Racing	The Home Depot	160	Running
8	17	2	Rusty Wallace	Ford	Penske Racing	Miller Lite	160	Running
9	14	10	Ricky Rudd	Ford	Rudd Performance Motorsports	Tide	160	Running
10	18	3	Dale Earnhardt	Chevrolet	Richard Childress Racing	GM Goodwrench Service Plus	160	Running
11	22	5	Terry Labonte	Chevrolet	Hendrick Motorsports	Kellogg's	160	Running
12	6	31	Mike Skinner	Chevrolet	Richard Childress Racing	Lowe's	160	Running
13	15	28	Kenny Irwin Jr.	Ford	Robert Yates Racing	Texaco / Havoline	160	Running
14	27	25	Wally Dallenbach Jr.	Chevrolet	Hendrick Motorsports	Budweiser	160	Running
15	32	1	Steve Park	Chevrolet	Dale Earnhardt, Inc.	Pennzoil	160	Running
16	21	40	Sterling Marlin	Chevrolet	Team SABCO	Coors Light / Brooks & Dunn	160	Running
17	25	77	Robert Pressley	Ford	Jasper Motorsports	Jasper Engines and Transmissions	160	Running
18	9	33	Ken Schrader	Chevrolet	Andy Petree Racing	Skoal	160	Running
19	39	26	Johnny Benson Jr.	Ford	Roush Racing	Cheerio's	160	Running
20	3	41	David Green	Chevrolet	Larry Hedrick Motorsports	Kodiak	160	Running
21	13	21	Elliott Sadler	Ford	Wood Brothers Racing	Citgo	160	Running
22	33	42	Joe Nemechek	Chevrolet	Team SABCO	Bellsouth	159	Running
23	8	94	Bill Elliott	Ford	Bill Elliott Racing	McDonald's	159	Running
24	40	36	Ernie Irvan	Pontiac	MB2 Motorsports	M&M's	159	Running
25	23	60	Geoff Bodine	Chevrolet	Joe Bessey Motorsports	Power Team	159	Running
26	42	23	Jimmy Spencer	Ford	Haas-Carter Motorsports	Team Winston / No Bull	159	Running
27	5	7	Michael Waltrip	Chevrolet	Mattei Motorsports	Phillips Electronics	159	Running
28	20	93	Dave Blaney	Pontiac	Bill Davis Racing	Amoco	159	Running
29	19	12	Jeremy Mayfield	Ford	Penske-Kranefuss Racing	Mobil 1	159	Running
30	43	16	Kevin Lepage	Ford	Roush Racing	TV Guide / Sting	159	Running
31	28	9	Jerry Nadeau	Ford	Melling Racing	Cartoon Network / The Jetsons / TBS	159	Running
32	31	30	Derrike Cope	Pontiac	Bahari Racing	Jimmy Dean	159	Running
33	36	58	Hut Stricklin	Ford	SBIII Motorsports	MTX Audio / CT Farms	158	Running
34	26	50	Ricky Craven	Chevrolet	Midwest Transit Racing	Midwest Transit	158	Running
35	30	75	Ted Musgrave	Ford	Butch Mock Motorsports	Remington Arms	158	Running
36	34	98	Rick Mast	Ford	Cale Yarborough Motorsports	Universal Studios	158	Running
37	10	43	John Andretti	Pontiac	Petty Enterprises	STP	158	Running
38	37	4	Bobby Hamilton	Chevrolet	Morgan-McClure Motorsports	Kodak	157	Running
39	41	55	Kenny Wallace	Chevrolet	Andy Petree Racing	Square D	157	Running
40	29	71	Dave Marcis	Chevrolet	Marcis Auto Racing	RealTree	139	Engine
41	24	44	Kyle Petty	Pontiac	Petty Enterprises	Hot Wheels	72	Crash
42	35	66	Darrell Waltrip	Ford	Haas-Carter Motorsports	Big Kmart / Route 66	58	Handling
43	38	97	Chad Little	Ford	Roush Racing	John Deere	41	Crash

=== Failed to qualify ===
- Rich Bickle (#45)
- Boris Said (#14)
- Brett Bodine (#11)
- Dick Trickle (#91)
- Steve Grissom (#01)
- Morgan Shepherd (#05)
- Lance Hooper (#62)
- Stanton Barrett (#90)
- Mike Wallace (#32)
- Gary Bradberry (#80)
- Buckshot Jones (#00)
- Bob Strait (#61)
- Jeff Green (#01)
- Jeff Davis (#62)

=== Race statistics ===
- Time of race: 2:41:57
- Average speed: 148.194 miles per hour (238.495 km/h)
- Pole speed: 179.612 miles per hour (289.057 km/h)
- Cautions: 3 for 12 laps
- Margin of victory: 3.351 seconds
- Lead changes: 13
- Percent of race run under caution: 7.5%
- Average green flag run: 37 laps

Lap leaders
Laps	Leader
1–5	Jeff Gordon
6–7	Mark Martin
8–26	Jeff Gordon
27	Dale Jarrett
28–39	Mark Martin
40–63	Dale Jarrett
64–65	Mark Martin
66–74	Dale Jarrett
75	Dave Marcis
76–77	Dale Jarrett
78	Bobby Labonte
79–116	Dale Jarrett
117	Jeff Burton
118–160	Dale Jarrett

Total laps led
Laps	Leader
117	Dale Jarrett
24	Jeff Gordon
16	Mark Martin
1	Bobby Labonte
1	Jeff Burton
1	Dave Marcis

Cautions: 3 for 12 laps
Laps	Reason
44–47	#97 (Chad Little) crash turn 2
74–77	#44 (Kyle Petty) crash turn 1
143–146	Oil on track

== Media ==
=== Television ===
The race was aired live on ABC in the United States. Bob Jenkins and 1973 NASCAR Winston Cup Series champion Benny Parsons called the race from the broadcast booth. Jerry Punch, Bill Weber and Ray Dunlap handled pit road for the television side.

ABC
Booth announcers		Pit reporters
Lap-by-lap	Color commentator	Pit reporters
Bob Jenkins	Benny Parsons	Jerry Punch; Bill Weber; Ray Dunlap
