= 2013 Cheez-It 355 at The Glen =

Race details
- Race 22 of 36 in the 2013 NASCAR Sprint Cup Series
- Date: August 11, 2013
- Location: Watkins Glen International, Watkins Glen, New York
- Course: Permanent racing facility
- Course length: 2.454 miles (5.43 km)
- Distance: 90 laps, 220.5 mi (354.9 km)
- Weather: Temperatures up to 78.1 °F (25.6 °C); wind speeds up to 8.9 miles per hour (14.3 km/h)
- Average speed: 87.001 mph (140.015 km/h)

Pole position
Driver	Marcos Ambrose	Richard Petty Motorsports
- Time: 68.777 seconds

Most laps led
Driver	Marcos Ambrose	Richard Petty Motorsports
- Laps: 51

Winner
No. 18	Kyle Busch	Joe Gibbs Racing

Television in the United States
- Network: ESPN
- Announcers: Allen Bestwick, Dale Jarrett and Andy Petree
- Nielsen ratings: 2.7 (4.171 million viewers)

The 2013 Cheez-It 355 at The Glen was a NASCAR Sprint Cup Series stock car race that was held on August 11 at Watkins Glen International in Watkins Glen, New York. Contested over 90 laps on the 2.45-mile (4.023 km) road course, it was the twenty-second race of the 2013 NASCAR Sprint Cup Series season. Kyle Busch of Joe Gibbs Racing won the race, his third of the season, while Brad Keselowski finished second. Martin Truex Jr., Carl Edwards and Juan Pablo Montoya rounded out the top five.

This was the first NASCAR race since the 1998 NAPA 500 without 5-Time Watkins Glen winner Tony Stewart on the grid.

== Report ==
=== Background ===
The layout of Watkins Glen International NASCAR uses.

Watkins Glen International is one of two road courses to hold NASCAR races, the other being Sonoma Raceway. The standard short road course at Watkins Glen International is a 7-turn course that is 2.45 miles (3.94 km) long; the track was modified in 1992, adding the Inner Loop, which lengthened the long course to 3.4 miles (5.5 km) and the short course to the current length of 2.45 miles (3.94 km). Marcos Ambrose was the defending race winner after winning the race in 2011 and 2012.

On August 6, it was announced that Tony Stewart would not be participating after breaking both bones in his right leg in a Sprint car accident at Southern Iowa Speedway in Oskaloosa, Iowa, on the night of August 5. Instead, road racing veteran Max Papis would step in and replace Stewart for the Watkins Glen event, with future drivers to be decided for the next four or five oval races. This marked the first race since his debut in the 1999 Daytona 500 that a Sprint Cup race did not have Stewart in the field, ending a streak of 521 straight starts for Stewart.

=== Entry list ===
(R) - Denotes rookie driver.

(i) - Denotes driver who is ineligible for series driver points.

No.	Driver	Team	Manufacturer
1	Jamie McMurray	Earnhardt Ganassi Racing	Chevrolet
2	Brad Keselowski	Penske Racing	Ford
5	Kasey Kahne	Hendrick Motorsports	Chevrolet
7	Dave Blaney	Tommy Baldwin Racing	Chevrolet
9	Marcos Ambrose	Richard Petty Motorsports	Ford
10	Danica Patrick (R)	Stewart–Haas Racing	Chevrolet
11	Denny Hamlin	Joe Gibbs Racing	Toyota
13	Casey Mears	Germain Racing	Ford
14	Max Papis (i)	Stewart–Haas Racing	Chevrolet
15	Clint Bowyer	Michael Waltrip Racing	Toyota
16	Greg Biffle	Roush Fenway Racing	Ford
17	Ricky Stenhouse Jr. (R)	Roush Fenway Racing	Ford
18	Kyle Busch	Joe Gibbs Racing	Toyota
19	Alex Kennedy	Humphrey Smith Racing	Toyota
20	Matt Kenseth	Joe Gibbs Racing	Toyota
22	Joey Logano	Penske Racing	Ford
24	Jeff Gordon	Hendrick Motorsports	Chevrolet
27	Paul Menard	Richard Childress Racing	Chevrolet
29	Kevin Harvick	Richard Childress Racing	Chevrolet
30	David Stremme	Swan Racing	Toyota
31	Jeff Burton	Richard Childress Racing	Chevrolet
32	Boris Said	FAS Lane Racing	Ford
33	Ron Fellows	Circle Sport	Chevrolet
34	David Ragan	Front Row Motorsports	Ford
35	Michael McDowell	Front Row Motorsports	Ford
36	Victor Gonzalez Jr.	Tommy Baldwin Racing	Chevrolet
38	David Gilliland	Front Row Motorsports	Ford
39	Ryan Newman	Stewart–Haas Racing	Chevrolet
40	Landon Cassill (i)	Circle Sport	Chevrolet
42	Juan Pablo Montoya	Earnhardt Ganassi Racing	Chevrolet
43	Aric Almirola	Richard Petty Motorsports	Ford
47	A. J. Allmendinger	JTG Daugherty Racing	Toyota
48	Jimmie Johnson	Hendrick Motorsports	Chevrolet
51	Owen Kelly (i)	Phoenix Racing	Chevrolet
52	Brian Keselowski	Brian Keselowski Motorsports	Toyota
55	Brian Vickers (i)	Michael Waltrip Racing	Toyota
56	Martin Truex Jr.	Michael Waltrip Racing	Toyota
78	Kurt Busch	Furniture Row Racing	Chevrolet
83	David Reutimann	BK Racing	Toyota
87	Tomy Drissi	NEMCO-Jay Robinson Racing	Toyota
88	Dale Earnhardt Jr.	Hendrick Motorsports	Chevrolet
93	Travis Kvapil	BK Racing	Toyota
99	Carl Edwards	Roush Fenway Racing	Ford
Official entry list

=== Practice and qualifying ===
==== Qualifying order ====
Group 1

No.	Driver	Team	Manufacturer
36	Victor Gonzalez Jr.	Tommy Baldwin Racing	Chevy
7	Dave Blaney	Tommy Baldwin Racing	Chevy
19	Alex Kennedy	Humphrey Smith Motorsports	Toyota
40	Landon Cassill	Circle Sport	Chevy
87	Tomy Drissi	NEMCO-Jay Robinson Racing	Toyota
52	Brian Keselowski	Brian Keselowski Motorsports	Toyota

Group 2

No.	Driver	Team	Manufacturer
38	David Gilliland	Front Row Motorsports	Ford
83	David Reutimann	BK Racing	Toyota
10	Danica Patrick	Stewart–Haas Racing	Chevy
93	Travis Kvapil	BK Racing	Toyota
51	Owen Kelly	Phoenix Racing	Chevy
30	David Stremme	Swan Racing Company	Toyota

Group 3

No.	Driver	Team	Manufacturer
17	Ricky Stenhouse Jr.	Roush Fenway Racing	Ford
14	Max Papis	Stewart–Haas Racing	Chevy
39	Ryan Newman	Stewart–Haas Racing	Chevy
34	David Ragan	Front Row Motorsports	Ford
55	Brian Vickers	Michael Waltrip Racing	Toyota
20	Matt Kenseth	Joe Gibbs Racing	Toyota

Group 4

No.	Driver	Team	Manufacturer
1	Jamie McMurray	Earnhardt Ganassi Racing	Chevy
29	Kevin Harvick	Richard Childress Racing	Chevy
43	Aric Almirola	Richard Petty Motorsports	Ford
32	Boris Said	FAS Lane Racing	Ford
33	Ron Fellows	Circle Sport	Chevy

Group 5

No.	Driver	Team	Manufacturer
48	Jimmie Johnson	Hendrick Motorsports	Chevy
27	Paul Menard	Richard Childress Racing	Chevy
22	Joey Logano	Penske Racing	Ford
31	Jeff Burton	Richard Childress Racing	Chevy
5	Kasey Kahne	Hendrick Motorsports	Chevy

Group 6

No.	Driver	Team	Manufacturer
78	Kurt Busch	Furniture Row Racing	Chevy
88	Dale Earnhardt Jr.	Hendrick Motorsports	Chevy
24	Jeff Gordon	Hendrick Motorsports	Chevy
35	Michael McDowell	Front Row Motorsports	Ford
16	Greg Biffle	Roush Fenway Racing	Ford

Group 7

No.	Driver	Team	Manufacturer
18	Kyle Busch	Joe Gibbs Racing	Toyota
47	A. J. Allmendinger	JTG Daugherty Racing	Toyota
15	Clint Bowyer	Michael Waltrip Racing	Toyota
2	Brad Keselowski	Penske Racing	Ford
11	Denny Hamlin	Joe Gibbs Racing	Toyota

Group 8

No.	Driver	Team	Manufacturer
56	Martin Truex Jr.	Michael Waltrip Racing	Toyota
9	Marcos Ambrose	Richard Petty Motorsports	Ford
99	Carl Edwards	Roush Fenway Racing	Ford
42	Juan Pablo Montoya	Earnhardt Ganassi Racing	Chevy
13	Casey Mears	Germain Racing	Ford

=== Race ===
==== Start ====
The race was scheduled to start at 1:18 p.m. EDT, Marcos Ambrose led the field to the green flag on lap 1.

==== 1st caution, restart and wreck ====
The first caution came out on lap 15 for a crash by Jeff Gordon in the back straightaway, the race restarted on lap 19, a couple of laps later, the second caution came out for a multi-car crash in the straightaway, by lap 41, the race was red flagged for seven minutes for cleanup on the track, the race restarted on lap 43.

==== Quarter mark ====
The third caution came out when Kyle Busch spun into the tires, and was out of gas, the race restarted on lap 63, A couple of laps later, the fourth caution came out for a wreck again on lap 80, some cars were involved in the crash, the race restarted on lap 86, and the fifth caution came out on lap 85 for a crash by Marcos Ambrose, The race restarted on lap 88, and Kyle Busch won his race at Watkins-Glen.

== Results ==
=== Qualifying ===
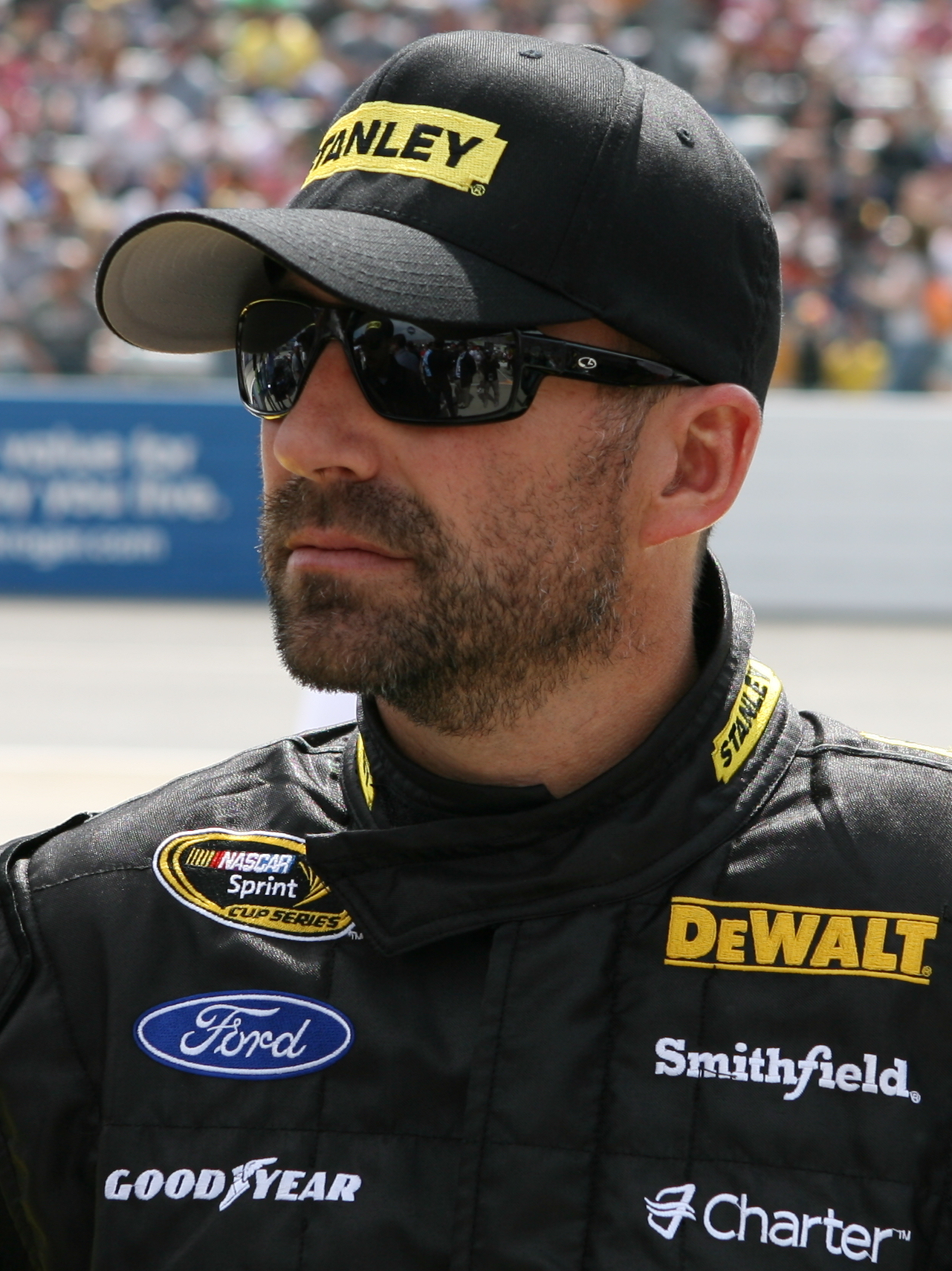
Marcos Ambrose scored the pole position.

Grid	No.	Driver	Team	Manufacturer	Time	Speed
1	9	Marcos Ambrose	Richard Petty Motorsports	Ford	68.777	128.241
2	15	Clint Bowyer	Michael Waltrip Racing	Toyota	68.929	127.958
3	56	Martin Truex Jr.	Michael Waltrip Racing	Toyota	69.197	127.462
4	47	A. J. Allmendinger	JTG Daugherty Racing	Toyota	69.213	127.433
5	18	Kyle Busch	Joe Gibbs Racing	Toyota	69.231	127.400
6	1	Jamie McMurray	Earnhardt Ganassi Racing	Chevrolet	69.245	127.374
7	27	Paul Menard	Richard Childress Racing	Chevrolet	69.369	127.146
8	2	Brad Keselowski	Penske Racing	Ford	69.372	127.141
9	22	Joey Logano	Penske Racing	Ford	69.388	127.111
10	20	Matt Kenseth	Joe Gibbs Racing	Toyota	69.428	127.038
11	42	Juan Pablo Montoya	Earnhardt Ganassi Racing	Chevrolet	69.486	126.932
12	35	Michael McDowell	Front Row Motorsports	Ford	69.546	126.823
13	78	Kurt Busch	Furniture Row Racing	Chevrolet	69.551	126.813
14	39	Ryan Newman	Stewart–Haas Racing	Chevrolet	69.577	126.766
15	55	Brian Vickers	Michael Waltrip Racing	Toyota	69.715	126.515
16	99	Carl Edwards	Roush Fenway Racing	Ford	69.743	126.464
17	16	Greg Biffle	Roush Fenway Racing	Ford	69.791	126.377
18	48	Jimmie Johnson	Hendrick Motorsports	Chevrolet	69.802	126.357
19	5	Kasey Kahne	Hendrick Motorsports	Chevrolet	69.822	126.321
20	11	Denny Hamlin	Joe Gibbs Racing	Toyota	69.884	126.209
21	38	David Gilliland	Front Row Motorsports	Ford	69.931	126.124
22	31	Jeff Burton	Richard Childress Racing	Chevrolet	69.952	126.086
23	51	Owen Kelly	Phoenix Racing	Chevrolet	69.994	126.011
24	33	Ron Fellows	Circle Sport	Chevrolet	70.042	125.924
25	88	Dale Earnhardt Jr.	Hendrick Motorsports	Chevrolet	70.069	125.876
26	29	Kevin Harvick	Richard Childress Racing	Chevrolet	70.161	125.711
27	32	Boris Said	FAS Lane Racing	Ford	70.163	125.707
28	24	Jeff Gordon	Hendrick Motorsports	Chevrolet	70.228	125.591
29	14	Max Papis	Stewart–Haas Racing	Chevrolet	70.229	125.589
30	13	Casey Mears	Germain Racing	Ford	70.622	124.890
31	34	David Ragan	Front Row Motorsports	Ford	70.646	124.848
32	43	Aric Almirola	Richard Petty Motorsports	Ford	70.677	124.793
33	17	Ricky Stenhouse Jr.	Roush Fenway Racing	Ford	70.800	124.576
34	36	Victor Gonzalez Jr.	Tommy Baldwin Racing	Chevrolet	71.199	123.878
35	10	Danica Patrick	Stewart–Haas Racing	Chevrolet	71.273	123.750
36	83	David Reutimann	BK Racing	Toyota	71.297	123.708
37	19	Alex Kennedy	Humphrey Smith Racing	Toyota	71.309	123.687
38	93	Travis Kvapil	BK Racing	Toyota	71.338	123.637
39	30	David Stremme	Swan Racing	Toyota	71.616	123.157
40	7	Dave Blaney	Tommy Baldwin Racing	Chevrolet	71.652	123.095
41	40	Landon Cassill	Circle Sport	Chevrolet	72.293	122.004
42	87	Tomy Drissi	NEMCO-Jay Robinson Racing	Toyota	73.320	120.295
43	52	Brian Keselowski	Brian Keselowski Motorsports	Toyota	74.165	118.924

=== Race results ===
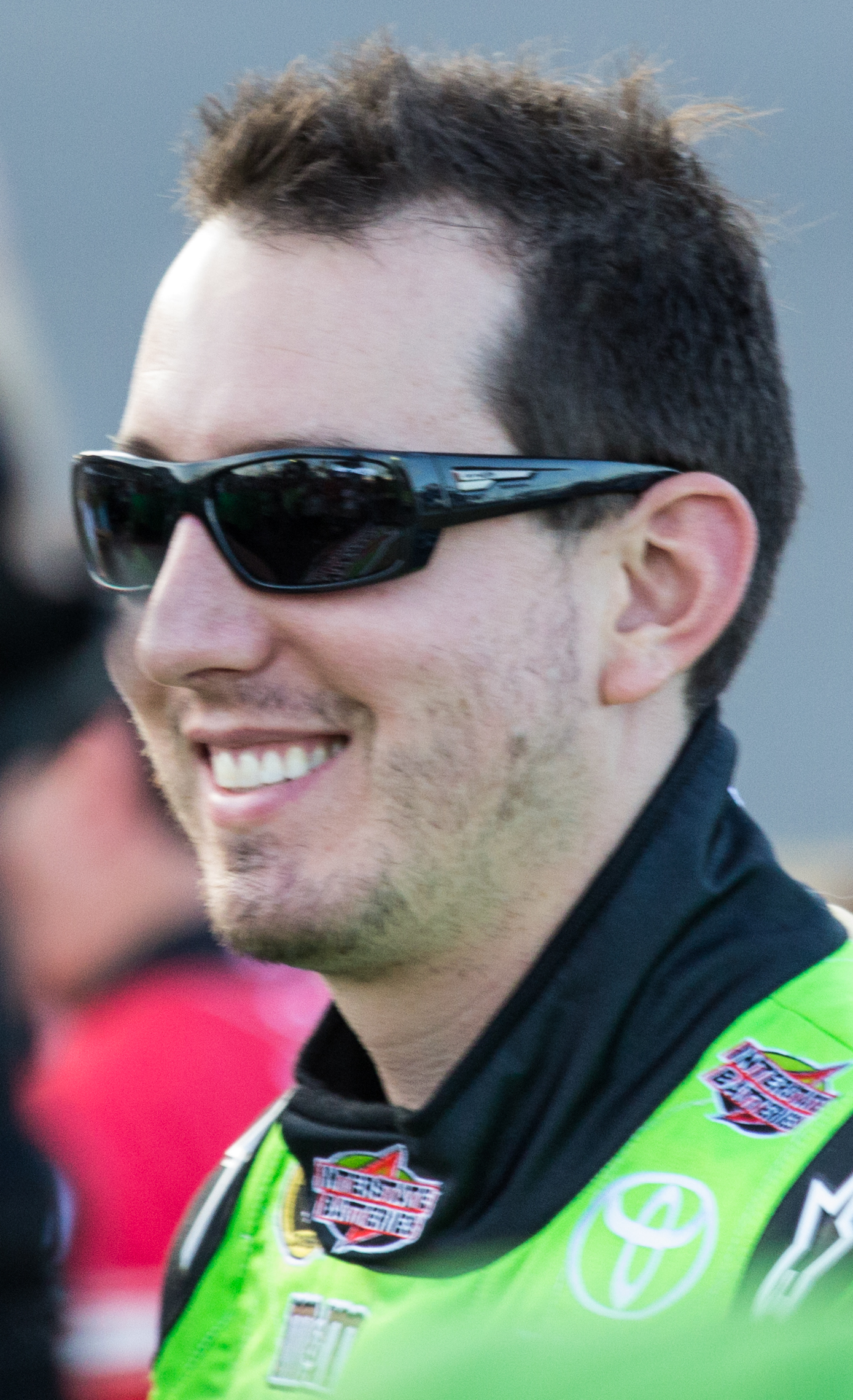
Kyle Busch won the race.

Pos	No.	Driver	Team	Manufacturer	Laps	Led	Points^{1}
1	18	Kyle Busch	Joe Gibbs Racing	Toyota	90	21	47
2	2	Brad Keselowski	Penske Racing	Ford	90	0	42
3	56	Martin Truex Jr.	Michael Waltrip Racing	Toyota	90	0	41
4	99	Carl Edwards	Roush Fenway Racing	Ford	90	0	40
5	42	Juan Pablo Montoya	Earnhardt Ganassi Racing	Chevrolet	90	1	40
6	15	Clint Bowyer	Michael Waltrip Racing	Toyota	90	0	38
7	22	Joey Logano	Penske Racing	Ford	90	0	37
8	48	Jimmie Johnson	Hendrick Motorsports	Chevrolet	90	0	36
9	78	Kurt Busch	Furniture Row Racing	Chevrolet	90	0	35
10	47	A. J. Allmendinger	JTG Daugherty Racing	Toyota	90	0	34
11	1	Jamie McMurray	Earnhardt Ganassi Racing	Chevrolet	90	1	34
12	13	Casey Mears	Germain Racing	Ford	90	0	32
13	29	Kevin Harvick	Richard Childress Racing	Chevrolet	90	8	32
14	39	Ryan Newman	Stewart–Haas Racing	Chevrolet	90	0	30
15	14	Max Papis	Stewart–Haas Racing	Chevrolet	90	0	0^{[2]}
16	16	Greg Biffle	Roush Fenway Racing	Ford	90	0	28
17	27	Paul Menard	Richard Childress Racing	Chevrolet	90	0	27
18	17	Ricky Stenhouse Jr.	Roush Fenway Racing	Ford	90	0	26
19	11	Denny Hamlin	Joe Gibbs Racing	Toyota	90	0	25
20	10	Danica Patrick	Stewart–Haas Racing	Chevrolet	90	0	24
21	34	David Ragan	Front Row Motorsports	Ford	90	0	23
22	32	Boris Said	FAS Lane Racing	Ford	90	0	22
23	20	Matt Kenseth	Joe Gibbs Racing	Toyota	90	0	21
24	51	Owen Kelly	Phoenix Racing	Chevrolet	90	0	0^{[2]}
25	38	David Gilliland	Front Row Motorsports	Ford	90	0	19
26	31	Jeff Burton	Richard Childress Racing	Chevrolet	90	0	18
27	7	Dave Blaney	Tommy Baldwin Racing	Chevrolet	90	0	17
28	40	Landon Cassill	Circle Sport	Chevrolet	90	0	0^{[2]}
29	19	Alex Kennedy	Humphrey Smith Racing	Toyota	90	0	15
30	88	Dale Earnhardt Jr.	Hendrick Motorsports	Chevrolet	85	0	14
31	9	Marcos Ambrose	Richard Petty Motorsports	Ford	84	51	15
32	55	Brian Vickers	Michael Waltrip Racing	Toyota	84	0	0^{[2]}
33	30	David Stremme	Swan Racing	Toyota	83	0	11
34	5	Kasey Kahne	Hendrick Motorsports	Chevrolet	82	0	10
35	33	Ron Fellows	Circle Sport	Chevrolet	74	0	9
36	24	Jeff Gordon	Hendrick Motorsports	Chevrolet	65	0	8
37	43	Aric Almirola	Richard Petty Motorsports	Ford	58	0	7
38	35	Michael McDowell	Front Row Motorsports	Ford	58	0	6
39	52	Brian Keselowski	Brian Keselowski Motorsports	Toyota	47	0	5
40	93	Travis Kvapil	BK Racing	Toyota	41	0	4
41	36	Victor Gonzalez Jr.	Tommy Baldwin Racing	Chevrolet	39	0	3
42	87	Tomy Drissi	NEMCO-Jay Robinson Racing	Toyota	39	0	2
43	83	David Reutimann	BK Racing	Toyota	4	0	1

Notes
1. ^1 Points include 3 Chase for the Sprint Cup points for winning, 1 point for leading a lap, and 1 point for most laps led.
2. ^{a} ^{b} ^{c} ^{d} Ineligible for drivers' championship points.

== Standings after the race ==
Drivers' championship standings

	Pos	Driver	Points
	1	Jimmie Johnson	808
	2	Clint Bowyer	733 (-75)
	3	Carl Edwards	728 (-80)
	4	Kevin Harvick	707 (-101)
1	5	Kyle Busch	693 (-115)

Manufacturers' championship standings

Pos	Manufacturer	Points
1	Chevrolet	156
2	Toyota	144 (-12)
3	Ford	111 (-45)

- Note: Only the first ten positions are included for the driver standings.

Previous race: 2013 Gobowling.com 400	Sprint Cup Series; 2013 season	Next race: 2013 Pure Michigan 400
