= Harris DeVane =

American racing driver (1963–2018)

- Nationality: (United States) American
- Born: Marvin DeVane Jr. August 2, 1963 Cuthbert, Georgia, U.S.
- Died: March 1, 2018 (aged 54)

ARCA Racing Series
- Years active: 1994–1998
- Teams: Highland Timber Racing
- Car number: 33
- Starts: 59
- Wins: 1
- Poles: 0
- Best finish: 3rd in 1996

Awards
- 1995 1995: ARCA Co-Rookie of the Year; ARCA Most Popular Driver

Marvin "Harris" DeVane Jr. (August 2, 1963 – March 1, 2018) was an American stock car racing driver. He competed in the ARCA Racing Series, scoring his only career series victory in one of the closest finishes in series history at Atlanta Motor Speedway.

== Personal life ==
A peanut farmer and a native of Cuthbert, Georgia, DeVane attended Randolph Southern School and is a graduate of Abraham Baldwin Agricultural College.

== Racing career ==
DeVane began racing in 1978 at Albany Motor Speedway. Moving to touring series competition in the early 1990s, he made 59 starts in the ARCA Racing Series between 1994 and 1998. In 1995, he won the series' Bill France Four Crown Award, given to the driver with the best finishes on each of the types of tracks (superspeedway, road course, short track, and dirt track) the series competes on, and was the series' co-Rookie of the Year; after fellow rookie Andy Hillenburg became ineligible for the rookie title due to winning the series championship, he was tied with Dill Whittymore, and the series chose to equally award the title to both drivers. He also won the series' Most Popular Driver award that season.

DeVane scored one win in the ARCA Racing Series, at Atlanta Motor Speedway in 1997. It was the first race run on the track's current configuration; he led only the last 100 yards (90 m) of the final lap of the race, moving from third to first to beat Andy Hillenburg and Frank Kimmel by 0.023 seconds.

DeVane also competed on a limited basis in NASCAR competition; in 1994, he attempted to qualify for a Busch Series Grand National Division event at Talladega Superspeedway, but failed to make the field. He also attempted to qualify for two Winston Cup Series races, both at Atlanta Motor Speedway: his first attempt at making his debut in the series was at the NAPA 500 in the fall of 1998, with his second attempt at the Cracker Barrel 500 in the spring of 1999; however, he failed to qualify for either event. He was hospitalized after crashing during his second-round qualifying attempt for the NAPA 500, and withdrew before second-round qualifying in 1999 due to a lack of speed.

== Death ==
DeVane died on March 1, 2018, after a brief illness at age 54.

== Motorsports career results ==
=== NASCAR ===
(key) (Bold – Pole position awarded by qualifying time. Italics – Pole position earned by points standings or practice time. * – Most laps led.)

==== Winston Cup Series ====
NASCAR Winston Cup Series results
Year	Team	No.	Make	1	2	3	4	5	6	7	8	9	10	11	12	13	14	15	16	17	18	19	20	21	22	23	24	25	26	27	28	29	30	31	32	33	34	NWCC	Pts	Ref
1998	Highland Timber Racing	08	Chevy	DAY	CAR	LVS	ATL	DAR	BRI	TEX	MAR	TAL	CAL	CLT	DOV	RCH	MCH	POC	SON	NHA	POC	IND	GLN	MCH	BRI	NHA	DAR	RCH	DOV	MAR	CLT	TAL	DAY	PHO	CAR	ATL; DNQ		NA	0	
1999	Highland Timber Racing	08	Chevy	DAY	CAR	LVS	ATL; DNQ	DAR	TEX	BRI	MAR	TAL	CAL	RCH	CLT	DOV	MCH	POC	SON	DAY	NHA	POC	IND	GLN	MCH	BRI	DAR	RCH	NHA	DOV	MAR	CLT	TAL	CAR	PHO	HOM	ATL	NA	0	

==== Busch Series ====
NASCAR Busch Series results
Year	Team	No.	Make	1	2	3	4	5	6	7	8	9	10	11	12	13	14	15	16	17	18	19	20	21	22	23	24	25	26	27	28	NBSC	Pts	Ref
1994			Ford	DAY	CAR	RCH	ATL	MAR	DAR	HCY	BRI	ROU	NHA	NZH	CLT	DOV	MYB	GLN	MLW	SBO	TAL; DNQ	HCY	IRP	MCH	BRI	DAR	RCH	DOV	CLT	MAR	CAR	NA	0	

=== ARCA Bondo/Mar-Hyde Series ===
(key) (Bold – Pole position awarded by qualifying time. Italics – Pole position earned by points standings or practice time. * – Most laps led.)

ARCA Bondo/Mar-Hyde Series results
Year	Team	No.	Make	1	2	3	4	5	6	7	8	9	10	11	12	13	14	15	16	17	18	19	20	21	22	23	24	25	ABMSC	Pts	Ref
1994	Highland Timber Racing	33	Ford	DAY; DNQ	TAL; 13	FIF	LVL	KIL	TOL	FRS	MCH; 9	DMS	POC	POC; 8	KIL	FRS	INF	I70	ISF	DSF	TOL	SLM	WIN	ATL; 27					46th	910	
1995	Highland Timber Racing	33	Ford	DAY; 27	ATL; 25	TAL; 2	FIF; 8	KIL; 12	FRS; 18	MCH; 20	I80; 4	MCS; 13	FRS; 29	POC; 19	POC; 10	KIL; 10	FRS; 9	SBS; 3	LVL; 6	ISF; 3	DSF; 23	SLM; 9	WIN; 6	ATL; 30					7th	4765	
1996	Highland Timber Racing	33	Ford	DAY; 11	ATL; 9	SLM; 14	TAL; 9	FIF; 4	LVL; 9	CLT; 21	CLT; 3	KIL; 4	FRS; 7	POC; 4	MCH; 17	FRS; 17	TOL; 3	POC; 14	MCH; 7	INF; 12	SBS; 14	ISF; 23	DSF; 20	KIL; 9	SLM; 30	WIN; 6	CLT; 5	ATL; 8	3rd	5715	
1997	Highland Timber Racing	33	Ford	DAY; 13	ATL; 5	SLM	CLT	CLT	POC	MCH	SBS	TOL	KIL	FRS	MIN	POC	MCH	DSF	GTW	SLM	WIN	CLT	TAL; 6	ISF	ATL; 1				55th	-	
1998	Highland Timber Racing	33	Ford	DAY; 14	ATL; 16	SLM	CLT	MEM	MCH	POC	SBS	TOL	PPR	POC	KIL	FRS	ISF	ATL; 4	DSF	SLM	TEX	WIN	CLT	TAL; 28	ATL; 28				49th	-	
