= 2013 Gobowling.com 400 =

Race details
- Race 21 of 36 in the 2013 NASCAR Sprint Cup Series
- Date: August 4, 2013
- Location: Pocono Raceway, Long Pond, Pennsylvania
- Course: Permanent racing facility
- Course length: 2.5 miles (4.023 km)
- Distance: 160 laps, 400 mi (643.737 km)
- Weather: Temperatures reaching up to 79.0 °F (26.1 °C); average wind speeds of 13.0 miles per hour (20.9 km/h)
- Average speed: 129.009 mph (207.620 km/h)

Pole position
Driver	Jimmie Johnson	Hendrick Motorsports
- Time: 49.819 seconds

Most laps led
Driver	Kasey Kahne	Hendrick Motorsports
- Laps: 66

Winner
No. 5	Kasey Kahne	Hendrick Motorsports

Television in the United States
- Network: ESPN
- Announcers: Allen Bestwick, Dale Jarrett and Andy Petree
- Nielsen ratings: 3.2 (5.062 million viewers)

The 2013 Gobowling.com 400 was a NASCAR Sprint Cup Series stock car race that was held on August 4, 2013, at Pocono Raceway in Long Pond, Pennsylvania. Contested over 160 laps on the 2.5-mile (4.023 km) triangular superspeedway, it was the twenty-first race of the 2013 NASCAR Sprint Cup Series season. Kasey Kahne of Hendrick Motorsports won the race, his second win of the season, while Jeff Gordon finished second. Kurt Busch, Ryan Newman, and Dale Earnhardt Jr. rounded out the top five. The race was one of the most competitive races held at Pocono Raceway, as there were nine cautions, 14 different leaders, and 27 lead changes.

== Report ==
=== Background ===
Pocono Raceway is a three-turn superspeedway that is 2.5 miles (4.0 km) long. The track's turns are banked differently; the first is banked at 14°, the second turn at 8° and the final turn with 6°. However, each of the three straightaways are banked at 2°. The front stretch at Pocono Raceway is 3,740 feet long, the longest at the track. The back stretch, is 3,055 feet long, while the short stretch, which connects turn two with turn three, is only 1,780 feet long. Jeff Gordon was the defending race winner after winning the race in 2012.

Before the race, Jimmie Johnson was leading the Drivers' Championship with 740 points, while Clint Bowyer stood in second with 665 points. Carl Edwards followed in the third with 655, seven points ahead of Kevin Harvick and 39 ahead of Dale Earnhardt Jr. in fourth and fifth. Matt Kenseth, with 615 points, was in sixth; five ahead of Kyle Busch, who was scored seventh. Eighth-placed Greg Biffle was one point ahead of Kasey Kahne and six ahead of Gordon in ninth and tenth. In the Manufacturers' Championship, Chevrolet was leading with 143 points, twelve points ahead of Toyota. Ford was third after recording only 99 points before the race.

=== Entry list ===
(R) - Denotes rookie driver.

(i) - Denotes driver who is ineligible for series driver points.

No.	Driver	Team	Manufacturer
1	Jamie McMurray	Earnhardt Ganassi Racing	Chevrolet
2	Brad Keselowski	Penske Racing	Ford
5	Kasey Kahne	Hendrick Motorsports	Chevrolet
7	Dave Blaney	Tommy Baldwin Racing	Chevrolet
9	Marcos Ambrose	Richard Petty Motorsports	Ford
10	Danica Patrick (R)	Stewart–Haas Racing	Chevrolet
11	Denny Hamlin	Joe Gibbs Racing	Toyota
13	Casey Mears	Germain Racing	Ford
14	Tony Stewart	Stewart–Haas Racing	Chevrolet
15	Clint Bowyer	Michael Waltrip Racing	Toyota
16	Greg Biffle	Roush Fenway Racing	Ford
17	Ricky Stenhouse Jr. (R)	Roush Fenway Racing	Ford
18	Kyle Busch	Joe Gibbs Racing	Toyota
19	Alex Kennedy	Humphrey Smith Racing	Toyota
20	Matt Kenseth	Joe Gibbs Racing	Toyota
22	Joey Logano	Penske Racing	Ford
24	Jeff Gordon	Hendrick Motorsports	Chevrolet
27	Paul Menard	Richard Childress Racing	Chevrolet
29	Kevin Harvick	Richard Childress Racing	Chevrolet
30	David Stremme	Swan Racing	Toyota
31	Jeff Burton	Richard Childress Racing	Chevrolet
32	Timmy Hill (R)	FAS Lane Racing	Ford
33	Tony Raines (i)	Circle Sport	Chevrolet
34	David Ragan	Front Row Motorsports	Ford
35	Josh Wise (i)	Front Row Motorsports	Ford
36	J. J. Yeley	Tommy Baldwin Racing	Chevrolet
38	David Gilliland	Front Row Motorsports	Ford
39	Ryan Newman	Stewart–Haas Racing	Chevrolet
40	Landon Cassill (i)	Circle Sport	Chevrolet
42	Juan Pablo Montoya	Earnhardt Ganassi Racing	Chevrolet
43	Aric Almirola	Richard Petty Motorsports	Ford
47	Bobby Labonte	JTG Daugherty Racing	Toyota
48	Jimmie Johnson	Hendrick Motorsports	Chevrolet
51	A. J. Allmendinger	Phoenix Racing	Chevrolet
55	Mark Martin	Michael Waltrip Racing	Toyota
56	Martin Truex Jr.	Michael Waltrip Racing	Toyota
78	Kurt Busch	Furniture Row Racing	Chevrolet
83	David Reutimann	BK Racing	Toyota
87	Joe Nemechek (i)	NEMCO-Jay Robinson Racing	Toyota
88	Dale Earnhardt Jr.	Hendrick Motorsports	Chevrolet
93	Travis Kvapil	BK Racing	Toyota
98	Michael McDowell	Phil Parsons Racing	Ford
99	Carl Edwards	Roush Fenway Racing	Ford
Official entry list

=== Practice and qualifying ===
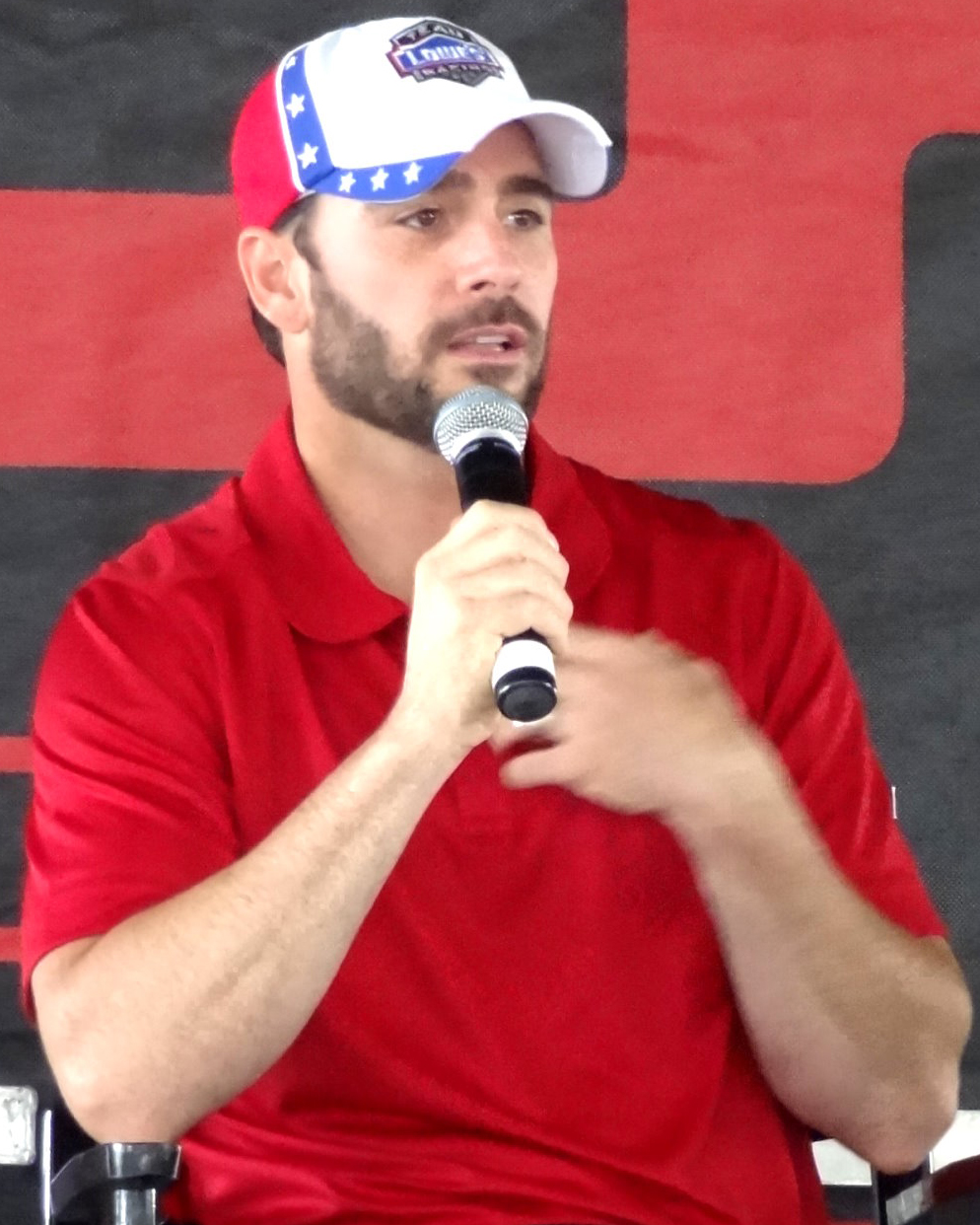
Jimmie Johnson scored his thirty-first pole position during qualifying.

Three practice sessions are scheduled to be held before the race. The first session, scheduled on August 2, 2013, was 90 minutes long. The second and third, held a day later on August 3, 2013, will last 50 minutes each. In the first practice session, Kurt Busch was the quickest with a best lap time of 50.600 seconds. Kyle Busch followed in second, ahead of Greg Biffle and Jeff Burton in third and fourth. Joey Logano was scored fifth quickest with a best lap time of 50.929, 329 thousandths of a second slower than Kurt Busch. Kahne, Marcos Ambrose, Ryan Newman, Denny Hamlin, and Edwards completed the top-ten.

During the qualifying session, Johnson, whose car was late to the qualifying grid, recorded his thirty-first career pole position, and set a new track record with a lap time of 49.819 seconds and a speed of 180.654 mph (290.734 km/h). Kyle Busch, who completed his lap in 49.823 seconds, will start alongside Johnson on the grid, in front of Edwards, Newman, and Kurt Busch. Logano, with a lap time of 50.111 seconds, was scored sixth ahead of Biffle and Ambrose in seventh and eighth. Hamlin and Aric Almirola completed the first ten grid positions with lap times of 28.162 and 28.191. After the session concluded, Johnson explained why his car was late to the qualifying grid, "We had a left rear toe (tire angle) was off by a thousandth of an inch. The system is pass-fail... a thousandth of an inch. I'm glad we got it sorted out."

=== Race ===
Before the race, NASCAR decided that there would be a competition caution on lap 20 because of Saturday practice being washed out.

Jimmie Johnson led the field to the green flag, but the field had only gotten through the first turn when the first caution came out for a crash, as Juan Pablo Montoya washed up the track into Ricky Stenhouse Jr., causing Stenhouse to spin out. Matt Kenseth was also collected. Montoya would finish three laps down in 28th, Kenseth would finish in 22nd on the lead lap, and Stenhouse would end up in 34th place, 46 laps down.

The race restarted on lap 5, with Johnson still leading. On lap 16, the second caution of the race came out when Denny Hamlin spun and hit the wall in turn 3. Hamlin would ultimately be credited with a last place finish. Due to its proximity to lap 20, NASCAR declared this to be the competition caution.

On the restart, Johnson continued to lead, and led until lap 33 when he pitted for a green flag pit stop, handing the lead to Brad Keselowski. A cycle of green flag pit stops was carried out over the next fifteen laps. Due to some cars staying out on the previous caution, the lead changed several times between lap 33 and lap 48. Keselowski led one lap before pitting. Kurt Busch then led seven laps before pitting. Dale Earnhardt Jr., Matt Kenseth and Jamie McMurray then each stayed out to lead a lap before pitting, which cycled the lead back to Johnson on lap 48.

On lap 53, the third caution came out when David Gilliland cut a right-front tire in the Tunnel Turn and hit the outside wall. Johnson and most of the leaders pitted under the caution. Ultimately, Johnson had a slow pit stop and ended up restarting in the middle of the pack. At the restart on lap 58, Keselowski led the field to the green flag. He led for four laps before a fast-charging Kasey Kahne managed to overtake him. Kahne led for ten laps before taking a green flag pit stop (he and Keselowski were on an off-sequence strategy). Ryan Newman held the lead for two laps before pitting, which handed the lead to Johnson. Johnson led until lap 75, when he pitted, giving the lead to Tony Stewart.

On lap 78, the fourth caution flag came out when Johnson cut a right front tire coming off the first turn and slapped the outside wall. This damaged his car significantly, and he stayed at the back of the lead lap for most of the remainder of the race, until his crew discovered that a spark plug had been knocked loose. Once this problem had been fixed, he rallied back to a 13th-place finish. Kahne reassumed the lead under caution.

At the restart on lap 82, Kahne and Keselowski were again at the front of the field. Over the next 13 laps, the two drivers exchanged the lead several times, until the fifth caution came out on lap 96 when David Stremme cut a right front tire in turn 1. Most of the leaders pitted under this caution, but Martin Truex Jr. stayed out and assumed the lead for the restart on lap 100. He then led the next three laps. On lap 104, the sixth caution came out when Aric Almirola cut a left rear tire and spun in turn 3 after contact with Timmy Hill.

Kahne reassumed the lead under caution and continued to lead at the restart on lap 107. On lap 110, the seventh caution flag came out for a four car accident at the Tunnel Turn exit. Danica Patrick was racing Travis Kvapil for 17th place when the two made contact and both cars got loose and spun. Kvapail was able to save his car, but Danica ended up being hit by Paul Menard and Jeff Burton.

The race restarted on lap 116 with Kahne still leading. Kahne continued to lead until a set of green flag pit stops on lap 130. As Kahne pitted, Kurt Busch assumed the lead for two laps before pitting, handing the lead to Almirola for lap 132. Almirola led that lap, then Dave Blaney assumed the lead for three laps before pitting on lap 135. David Ragan then held the lead for one lap before the lead cycled back to Kahne.

With 15 laps to go, three of the four Hendrick Motorsports cars were leading the field, with Kahne leading Gordon and Earnhardt Jr. The top five (the three Hendrick cars, plus Newman and Kurt Busch) were Chevrolets. Kahne was able to use lapped traffic to build up a 7.5 second lead on Gordon. This continued until lap 150, when the eighth caution came out for debris, erasing Kahne's lead on Gordon. Kahne restarted on the outside lane on lap 153. Kahne held the lead until Gordon overtook him in the Tunnel Turn. Gordon appeared to be on his way to his first victory of the season, but on lap 156, his lead was erased when Matt Kenseth spun in the Tunnel Turn.

On the last restart on lap 158, Gordon restarted on the inside and Kahne restarted on the outside. Gordon got a jump on the restart ahead of Kahne and Newman. Kahne caught up to Gordon and the two cars raced side by side down the Long Pond straightaway. Kahne cleared Gordon in the Tunnel Turn and assumed the lead at the white flag. He then held off Gordon and Kurt Busch over the last lap to win his second race of the season and his second Pocono race win.

Newman finished fourth, and Earnhardt Jr. finished fifth. Keselowski finished sixth, the highest non-Chevrolet finisher in the field. Joey Logano finished seventh, Kyle Busch finished eighth, while Stewart and Greg Biffle rounded out the top ten.

== Results ==
=== Qualifying ===
Grid	No.	Driver	Team	Manufacturer	Time	Speed
1	48	Jimmie Johnson	Hendrick Motorsports	Chevrolet	49.819	180.654
2	18	Kyle Busch	Joe Gibbs Racing	Toyota	49.823	180.639
3	99	Carl Edwards	Roush Fenway Racing	Ford	49.950	180.180
4	39	Ryan Newman	Stewart–Haas Racing	Chevrolet	49.999	180.004
5	78	Kurt Busch	Furniture Row Racing	Chevrolet	50.085	179.695
6	22	Joey Logano	Penske Racing	Ford	50.111	179.601
7	16	Greg Biffle	Roush Fenway Racing	Ford	50.130	179.533
8	9	Marcos Ambrose	Richard Petty Motorsports	Ford	50.187	179.329
9	11	Denny Hamlin	Joe Gibbs Racing	Toyota	50.239	179.144
10	43	Aric Almirola	Richard Petty Motorsports	Ford	50.253	179.094
11	2	Brad Keselowski	Penske Racing	Ford	50.297	178.937
12	1	Jamie McMurray	Earnhardt Ganassi Racing	Chevrolet	50.322	178.848
13	31	Jeff Burton	Richard Childress Racing	Chevrolet	50.373	178.667
14	29	Kevin Harvick	Richard Childress Racing	Chevrolet	50.418	178.508
15	51	A. J. Allmendinger	Phoenix Racing	Chevrolet	50.420	178.501
16	15	Clint Bowyer	Michael Waltrip Racing	Toyota	50.446	178.409
17	17	Ricky Stenhouse Jr.	Roush Fenway Racing	Ford	50.487	178.264
18	5	Kasey Kahne	Hendrick Motorsports	Chevrolet	50.488	178.260
19	42	Juan Pablo Montoya	Earnhardt Ganassi Racing	Chevrolet	50.546	178.056
20	14	Tony Stewart	Stewart–Haas Racing	Chevrolet	50.553	178.031
21	27	Paul Menard	Richard Childress Racing	Chevrolet	50.567	177.982
22	24	Jeff Gordon	Hendrick Motorsports	Chevrolet	50.659	177.658
23	93	Travis Kvapil	BK Racing	Toyota	50.678	177.592
24	20	Matt Kenseth	Joe Gibbs Racing	Toyota	50.702	177.508
25	88	Dale Earnhardt Jr.	Hendrick Motorsports	Chevrolet	50.721	177.441
26	56	Martin Truex Jr.	Michael Waltrip Racing	Toyota	50.779	177.239
27	98	Michael McDowell	Phil Parsons Racing	Ford	50.784	177.221
28	55	Mark Martin	Michael Waltrip Racing	Toyota	50.850	176.991
29	13	Casey Mears	Germain Racing	Ford	50.864	176.942
30	34	David Ragan	Front Row Motorsports	Ford	50.894	176.838
31	30	David Stremme	Swan Racing	Toyota	50.899	176.821
32	7	Dave Blaney	Tommy Baldwin Racing	Chevrolet	51.059	176.267
33	47	Bobby Labonte	JTG Daugherty Racing	Toyota	51.108	176.098
34	10	Danica Patrick	Stewart–Haas Racing	Chevrolet	51.177	175.860
35	83	David Reutimann	BK Racing	Toyota	51.211	175.743
36	36	J. J. Yeley	Tommy Baldwin Racing	Chevrolet	51.376	175.179
37	38	David Gilliland	Front Row Motorsports	Ford	51.415	175.046
38	40	Landon Cassill	Circle Sport	Chevrolet	51.462	174.886
39	87	Joe Nemechek	NEMCO-Jay Robinson Racing	Toyota	51.696	174.095
40	35	Josh Wise	Front Row Motorsports	Ford	51.815	173.695
41	32	Timmy Hill	FAS Lane Racing	Ford	52.305	172.068
42	19	Alex Kennedy	Humphrey Smith Racing	Toyota	53.286	168.900
43	33	Tony Raines	Circle Sport	Chevrolet	53.960	166.790

=== Race results ===
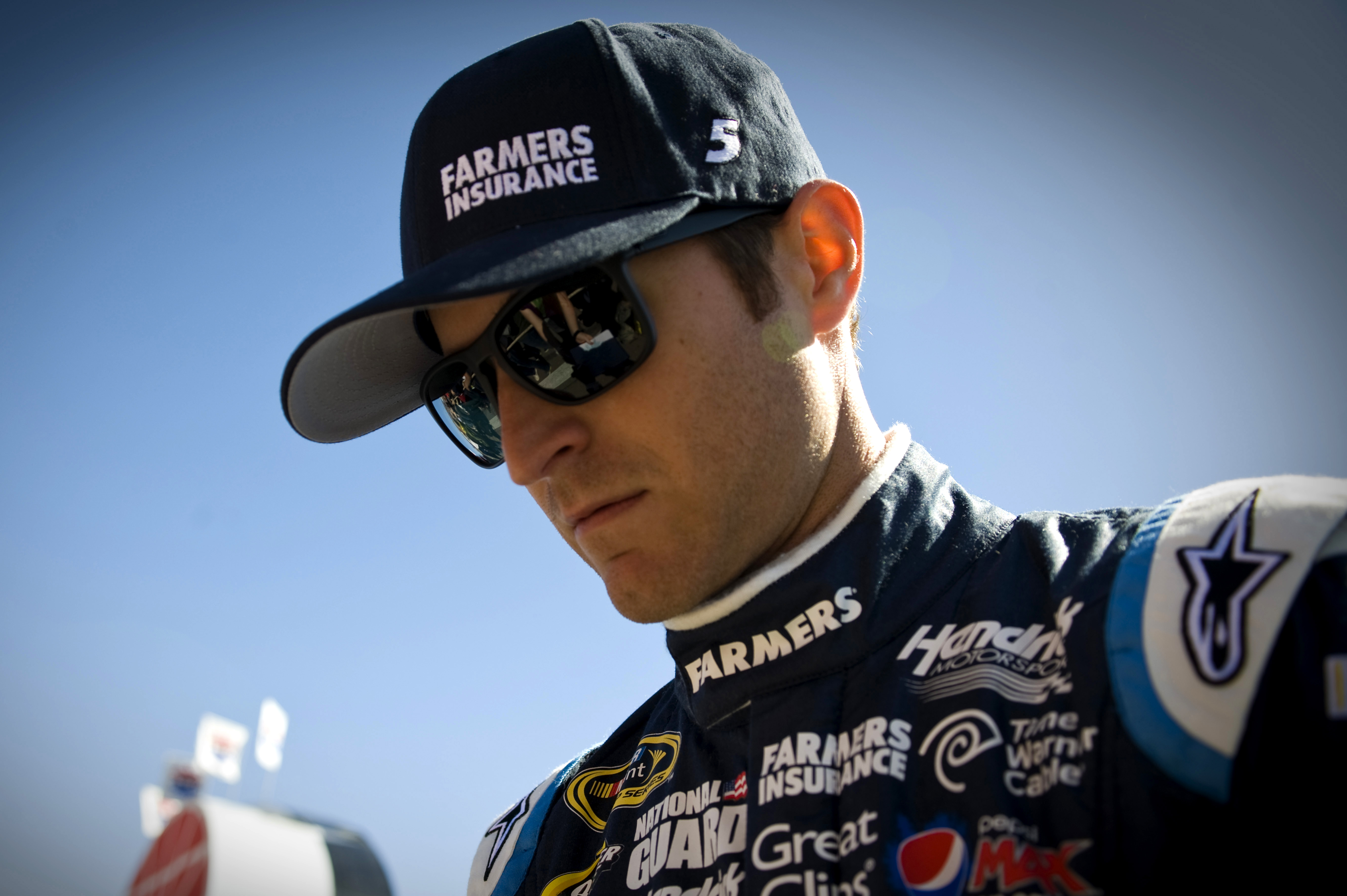
Kasey Kahne won the race.

Pos	No.	Driver	Team	Manufacturer	Laps	Led	Points^{1}
1	5	Kasey Kahne	Hendrick Motorsports	Chevrolet	160	66	48
2	24	Jeff Gordon	Hendrick Motorsports	Chevrolet	160	7	43
3	78	Kurt Busch	Furniture Row Racing	Chevrolet	160	9	42
4	39	Ryan Newman	Stewart–Haas Racing	Chevrolet	160	2	41
5	88	Dale Earnhardt Jr.	Hendrick Motorsports	Chevrolet	160	2	40
6	2	Brad Keselowski	Penske Racing	Ford	160	14	39
7	22	Joey Logano	Penske Racing	Ford	160	0	37
8	18	Kyle Busch	Joe Gibbs Racing	Toyota	160	0	36
9	14	Tony Stewart	Stewart–Haas Racing	Chevrolet	160	3	36
10	16	Greg Biffle	Roush Fenway Racing	Ford	160	0	34
11	99	Carl Edwards	Roush Fenway Racing	Ford	160	0	33
12	9	Marcos Ambrose	Richard Petty Motorsports	Ford	160	0	32
13	48	Jimmie Johnson	Hendrick Motorsports	Chevrolet	160	43	32
14	15	Clint Bowyer	Michael Waltrip Racing	Toyota	160	0	30
15	56	Martin Truex Jr.	Michael Waltrip Racing	Toyota	160	7	30
16	1	Jamie McMurray	Earnhardt Ganassi Racing	Chevrolet	160	1	29
17	29	Kevin Harvick	Richard Childress Racing	Chevrolet	160	0	27
18	55	Mark Martin	Michael Waltrip Racing	Toyota	160	0	26
19	47	Bobby Labonte	JTG Daugherty Racing	Toyota	160	0	25
20	43	Aric Almirola	Richard Petty Motorsports	Ford	160	1	25
21	34	David Ragan	Front Row Motorsports	Ford	160	1	24
22	20	Matt Kenseth	Joe Gibbs Racing	Toyota	160	1	23
23	7	Dave Blaney	Tommy Baldwin Racing	Chevrolet	160	3	22
24	13	Casey Mears	Germain Racing	Ford	160	0	20
25	36	J. J. Yeley	Tommy Baldwin Racing	Ford	160	0	19
26	93	Travis Kvapil	BK Racing	Toyota	160	0	18
27	32	Timmy Hill	FAS Lane Racing	Ford	158	0	17
28	42	Juan Pablo Montoya	Earnhardt Ganassi Racing	Chevrolet	157	0	16
29	40	Landon Cassill	Circle Sport	Chevrolet	157	0	0^{[2]}
30	30	David Stremme	Swan Racing	Toyota	151	0	14
31	83	David Reutimann	BK Racing	Toyota	141	0	13
32	27	Paul Menard	Richard Childress Racing	Chevrolet	127	0	12
33	51	A. J. Allmendinger	Phoenix Racing	Chevrolet	122	0	11
34	17	Ricky Stenhouse Jr.	Roush Fenway Racing	Ford	113	0	10
35	10	Danica Patrick	Stewart–Haas Racing	Chevrolet	110	0	9
36	31	Jeff Burton	Richard Childress Racing	Chevrolet	109	0	8
37	87	Joe Nemechek	NEMCO Motorsports	Toyota	55	0	0^{[2]}
38	33	Tony Raines	Circle Sport	Chevrolet	53	0	0^{[2]}
39	38	David Gilliland	Front Row Motorsports	Ford	51	0	5
40	98	Michael McDowell	Phil Parsons Racing	Ford	44	0	4
41	35	Josh Wise	Front Row Motorsports	Ford	44	0	0^{[2]}
42	19	Alex Kennedy	Humphrey Smith Racing	Toyota	22	0	2
43	11	Denny Hamlin	Joe Gibbs Racing	Toyota	14	0	1

Notes
1. ^1 Points include 3 Chase for the Sprint Cup points for winning, 1 point for leading a lap, and 1 point for most laps led.
2. ^{a} ^{b} ^{c} ^{d} Ineligible for driver's championship points.

== Standings after the race ==
Drivers' Championship standings

Pos	Driver	Points
1	Jimmie Johnson	772
2	Clint Bowyer	695 (–77)
3	Carl Edwards	688 (–84)
4	Kevin Harvick	675 (–97)
5	Dale Earnhardt Jr.	656 (–116)

Manufacturers' Championship standings

Pos	Manufacturer	Points
1	Chevrolet	152
2	Toyota	135 (–17)
3	Ford	105 (–47)

- Note: Only the first twelve positions are included for the driver standings.

Previous race: 2013 Brickyard 400	Sprint Cup Series; 2013 season	Next race: 2013 Cheez-It 355 at The Glen
