= 1999 Kmart 400 =

14th race of the 1999 NASCAR Winston Cup Series

1999 Kmart 400 presented by Castrol Super Clean
Race details
- Race 14 of 34 in the 1999 NASCAR Winston Cup Series
- The 1999 Kmart 400 presented by Castrol Super Clean program cover.
- Date: June 13, 1999
- Official name: 31st Annual Kmart 400 presented by Castrol Super Clean
- Location: Brooklyn, Michigan, Michigan International Speedway
- Course: Permanent racing facility
- Course length: 2 miles (3.2 km)
- Distance: 200 laps, 400 mi (643.737 km)
- Scheduled distance: 200 laps, 400 mi (643.737 km)
- Average speed: 173.997 miles per hour (280.021 km/h)
- Attendance: 125,000

Pole position
Driver	Jeff Gordon	Hendrick Motorsports
- Time: 38.514

Most laps led
Driver	Dale Jarrett	Robert Yates Racing
- Laps: 150

Winner
No. 88	Dale Jarrett	Robert Yates Racing

Television in the United States
- Network: CBS
- Announcers: Mike Joy, Ned Jarrett, Buddy Baker

Radio in the United States
- Radio: Motor Racing Network

The 1999 Kmart 400 presented by Castrol Super Clean was the 14th stock car race of the 1999 NASCAR Winston Cup Series season and the 31st iteration of the event. The race was held on Sunday, June 13, 1999, in front of an audience of 125,000 in Brooklyn, Michigan, at Michigan International Speedway, a two-mile (3.2 km) moderate-banked D-shaped speedway. The race took the scheduled 200 laps to complete. In a caution-free race, Robert Yates Racing driver Dale Jarrett would dominate for most of the race to take his 20th career NASCAR Winston Cup Series victory and his second of the season. To fill out the podium, Hendrick Motorsports driver Jeff Gordon and Roush Racing driver Jeff Burton would finish second and third, respectively.

== Background ==
The layout of Michigan International Speedway, the venue where the race was held.

The race was held at Michigan International Speedway, a two-mile (3.2 km) moderate-banked D-shaped speedway located in Brooklyn, Michigan. The track is used primarily for NASCAR events. The track is owned by International Speedway Corporation. MIS is recognized as one of motorsports' premier facilities because of its wide racing surface and high banking (by open-wheel standards; the 18-degree banking is modest by stock car standards).

=== Entry list ===
- (R) denotes rookie driver.

#	Driver	Team	Make
00	Buckshot Jones (R)	Buckshot Racing	Pontiac
1	Steve Park	Dale Earnhardt, Inc.	Chevrolet
2	Rusty Wallace	Penske-Kranefuss Racing	Ford
3	Dale Earnhardt	Richard Childress Racing	Chevrolet
4	Bobby Hamilton	Morgan–McClure Motorsports	Chevrolet
5	Terry Labonte	Hendrick Motorsports	Chevrolet
6	Mark Martin	Roush Racing	Ford
7	Michael Waltrip	Mattei Motorsports	Chevrolet
9	Jerry Nadeau	Melling Racing	Ford
10	Ricky Rudd	Rudd Performance Motorsports	Ford
11	Brett Bodine	Brett Bodine Racing	Ford
12	Jeremy Mayfield	Penske-Kranefuss Racing	Ford
16	Kevin Lepage	Roush Racing	Ford
18	Bobby Labonte	Joe Gibbs Racing	Pontiac
20	Tony Stewart (R)	Joe Gibbs Racing	Pontiac
21	Elliott Sadler (R)	Wood Brothers Racing	Ford
22	Ward Burton	Bill Davis Racing	Pontiac
23	Jimmy Spencer	Haas-Carter Motorsports	Ford
24	Jeff Gordon	Hendrick Motorsports	Chevrolet
25	Wally Dallenbach Jr.	Hendrick Motorsports	Chevrolet
26	Johnny Benson Jr.	Roush Racing	Ford
28	Kenny Irwin Jr.	Robert Yates Racing	Ford
30	Derrike Cope	Bahari Racing	Pontiac
31	Mike Skinner	Richard Childress Racing	Chevrolet
33	Ken Schrader	Andy Petree Racing	Chevrolet
36	Ernie Irvan	MB2 Motorsports	Pontiac
40	Sterling Marlin	Team SABCO	Chevrolet
41	David Green	Larry Hedrick Motorsports	Chevrolet
42	Joe Nemechek	Team SABCO	Chevrolet
43	John Andretti	Petty Enterprises	Pontiac
44	Kyle Petty	Petty Enterprises	Pontiac
45	Rich Bickle	Tyler Jet Motorsports	Pontiac
55	Kenny Wallace	Andy Petree Racing	Chevrolet
58	Loy Allen Jr.	SBIII Motorsports	Ford
60	Geoff Bodine	Joe Bessey Racing	Chevrolet
66	Darrell Waltrip	Haas-Carter Motorsports	Ford
71	Dave Marcis	Marcis Auto Racing	Chevrolet
75	Ted Musgrave	Butch Mock Motorsports	Ford
77	Robert Pressley	Jasper Motorsports	Ford
88	Dale Jarrett	Robert Yates Racing	Ford
90	Hut Stricklin	Donlavey Racing	Ford
93	Dave Blaney	Bill Davis Racing	Pontiac
94	Bill Elliott	Bill Elliott Racing	Ford
97	Chad Little	Roush Racing	Ford
98	Rick Mast	Cale Yarborough Motorsports	Ford
99	Jeff Burton	Roush Racing	Ford
Official entry list

== Practice ==
=== First practice ===
The first practice session was held on Friday, June 11, at 10:15 AM EST. The session would last for one hour and 30 minutes. Rusty Wallace, driving for Penske-Kranefuss Racing, would set the fastest time in the session, with a lap of 38.598 and an average speed of 186.538 mph (300.204 km/h).

Pos.	#	Driver	Team	Make	Time	Speed
1	2	Rusty Wallace	Penske-Kranefuss Racing	Ford	38.598	186.538
2	22	Ward Burton	Bill Davis Racing	Pontiac	38.645	186.311
3	6	Mark Martin	Roush Racing	Ford	38.652	186.278
Full first practice results

=== Second practice ===
The second practice session was held on Friday, June 11, at 1:15 PM EST. The session would last for one hour and 15 minutes. Jeff Burton, driving for Roush Racing, would set the fastest time in the session, with a lap of 38.489 and an average speed of 187.066 mph (301.054 km/h).

Pos.	#	Driver	Team	Make	Time	Speed
1	99	Jeff Burton	Roush Racing	Ford	38.489	187.066
2	24	Jeff Gordon	Hendrick Motorsports	Chevrolet	38.607	186.495
3	1	Steve Park	Dale Earnhardt, Inc.	Chevrolet	38.625	186.408
Full second practice results

=== Final practice ===
The final practice session, sometimes referred to as Happy Hour, was held on Saturday, June 12, after the preliminary 1999 Michigan ARCA 200. The session would last for one hour. Bobby Labonte, driving for Joe Gibbs Racing, would set the fastest time in the session, with a lap of 39.766 and an average speed of 181.059 mph (291.386 km/h).

Pos.	#	Driver	Team	Make	Time	Speed
1	18	Bobby Labonte	Joe Gibbs Racing	Pontiac	39.766	181.059
2	22	Ward Burton	Bill Davis Racing	Pontiac	39.767	181.055
3	6	Mark Martin	Roush Racing	Ford	39.875	180.564
Full Happy Hour practice results

== Qualifying ==
Qualifying was split into two rounds. The first round was held on Friday, June 11, at 3:30 PM EST. Each driver would have one lap to set a time. During the first round, the top 25 drivers in the round would be guaranteed a starting spot in the race. If a driver was not able to guarantee a spot in the first round, they had the option to scrub their time from the first round and try and run a faster lap time in a second round qualifying run, held on Saturday, June 12, at 11:15 AM EST. As with the first round, each driver would have one lap to set a time. Positions 26-36 would be decided on time, while positions 37-43 would be based on provisionals. Six spots are awarded by the use of provisionals based on owner's points. The seventh is awarded to a past champion who has not otherwise qualified for the race. If no past champion needs the provisional, the next team in the owner points will be awarded a provisional.

Jeff Gordon, driving for Hendrick Motorsports, would win the pole, setting a time of 38.514 and an average speed of 186.945 miles per hour (300.859 km/h).

Three drivers would fail to qualify: Dave Marcis, Hut Stricklin, and Buckshot Jones.

=== Full qualifying results ===
Pos.	#	Driver	Team	Make	Time	Speed
1	24	Jeff Gordon	Hendrick Motorsports	Chevrolet	38.514	186.945
2	36	Ernie Irvan	MB2 Motorsports	Pontiac	38.562	186.712
3	6	Mark Martin	Roush Racing	Ford	38.592	186.567
4	33	Ken Schrader	Andy Petree Racing	Chevrolet	38.595	186.553
5	94	Bill Elliott	Bill Elliott Racing	Ford	38.597	186.543
6	88	Dale Jarrett	Robert Yates Racing	Ford	38.673	186.176
7	40	Sterling Marlin	Team SABCO	Chevrolet	38.676	186.162
8	22	Ward Burton	Bill Davis Racing	Pontiac	38.683	186.128
9	42	Joe Nemechek	Team SABCO	Chevrolet	38.692	186.085
10	1	Steve Park	Dale Earnhardt, Inc.	Chevrolet	38.709	186.003
11	25	Wally Dallenbach Jr.	Hendrick Motorsports	Chevrolet	38.736	185.874
12	28	Kenny Irwin Jr.	Robert Yates Racing	Ford	38.740	185.854
13	2	Rusty Wallace	Penske-Kranefuss Racing	Ford	38.742	185.845
14	99	Jeff Burton	Roush Racing	Ford	38.745	185.830
15	3	Dale Earnhardt	Richard Childress Racing	Chevrolet	38.765	185.735
16	7	Michael Waltrip	Mattei Motorsports	Chevrolet	38.787	185.629
17	12	Jeremy Mayfield	Penske-Kranefuss Racing	Ford	38.800	185.567
18	18	Bobby Labonte	Joe Gibbs Racing	Pontiac	38.836	185.395
19	55	Kenny Wallace	Andy Petree Racing	Chevrolet	38.839	185.381
20	9	Jerry Nadeau	Melling Racing	Ford	38.840	185.376
21	93	Dave Blaney	Bill Davis Racing	Pontiac	38.850	185.328
22	77	Robert Pressley	Jasper Motorsports	Ford	38.860	185.280
23	60	Geoff Bodine	Joe Bessey Racing	Chevrolet	38.886	185.157
24	43	John Andretti	Petty Enterprises	Pontiac	38.945	184.876
25	66	Darrell Waltrip	Haas-Carter Motorsports	Ford	38.950	184.852
26	26	Johnny Benson Jr.	Roush Racing	Ford	38.952	184.843
27	30	Derrike Cope	Bahari Racing	Pontiac	38.991	184.658
28	20	Tony Stewart (R)	Joe Gibbs Racing	Pontiac	39.009	184.573
29	23	Jimmy Spencer	Haas-Carter Motorsports	Ford	39.022	184.511
30	98	Rick Mast	Cale Yarborough Motorsports	Ford	39.055	184.355
31	16	Kevin Lepage	Roush Racing	Ford	39.058	184.341
32	75	Ted Musgrave	Butch Mock Motorsports	Ford	39.068	184.294
33	31	Mike Skinner	Richard Childress Racing	Chevrolet	39.097	184.157
34	97	Chad Little	Roush Racing	Ford	39.160	183.861
35	10	Ricky Rudd	Rudd Performance Motorsports	Ford	39.184	183.748
36	21	Elliott Sadler (R)	Wood Brothers Racing	Ford	39.241	183.482
Provisionals
37	5	Terry Labonte	Hendrick Motorsports	Chevrolet	-*	-*
38	4	Bobby Hamilton	Morgan–McClure Motorsports	Chevrolet	-*	-*
39	44	Kyle Petty	Petty Enterprises	Pontiac	-*	-*
40	11	Brett Bodine	Brett Bodine Racing	Ford	-*	-*
41	45	Rich Bickle	Tyler Jet Motorsports	Pontiac	-*	-*
42	41	David Green	Larry Hedrick Motorsports	Chevrolet	-*	-*
43	58	Loy Allen Jr.	SBIII Motorsports	Ford	-*	-*
Failed to qualify
44	71	Dave Marcis	Marcis Auto Racing	Chevrolet	39.320	183.113
45	90	Hut Stricklin	Donlavey Racing	Ford	39.491	182.320
46	00	Buckshot Jones (R)	Buckshot Racing	Pontiac	39.649	181.593
Official first round qualifying results
Official starting lineup

*Time not available.

== Race results ==
Fin	St	#	Driver	Team	Make	Laps	Led	Status	Pts	Winnings
1	6	88	Dale Jarrett	Robert Yates Racing	Ford	200	150	running	185	$144,820
2	1	24	Jeff Gordon	Hendrick Motorsports	Chevrolet	200	20	running	175	$96,805
3	14	99	Jeff Burton	Roush Racing	Ford	200	1	running	170	$77,480
4	8	22	Ward Burton	Bill Davis Racing	Pontiac	200	0	running	160	$63,205
5	18	18	Bobby Labonte	Joe Gibbs Racing	Pontiac	200	2	running	160	$67,745
6	10	1	Steve Park	Dale Earnhardt, Inc.	Chevrolet	199	0	running	150	$56,830
7	2	36	Ernie Irvan	MB2 Motorsports	Pontiac	199	4	running	151	$52,860
8	24	43	John Andretti	Petty Enterprises	Pontiac	199	0	running	142	$56,535
9	28	20	Tony Stewart (R)	Joe Gibbs Racing	Pontiac	198	0	out of gas	138	$50,335
10	3	6	Mark Martin	Roush Racing	Ford	198	17	running	139	$56,275
11	12	28	Kenny Irwin Jr.	Robert Yates Racing	Ford	198	0	running	130	$49,510
12	13	2	Rusty Wallace	Penske-Kranefuss Racing	Ford	198	0	running	127	$48,660
13	4	33	Ken Schrader	Andy Petree Racing	Chevrolet	198	0	running	124	$53,420
14	11	25	Wally Dallenbach Jr.	Hendrick Motorsports	Chevrolet	198	0	running	121	$45,210
15	16	7	Michael Waltrip	Mattei Motorsports	Chevrolet	198	0	running	118	$37,310
16	15	3	Dale Earnhardt	Richard Childress Racing	Chevrolet	198	0	running	115	$42,310
17	17	12	Jeremy Mayfield	Penske-Kranefuss Racing	Ford	198	0	running	112	$47,265
18	33	31	Mike Skinner	Richard Childress Racing	Chevrolet	198	0	running	109	$34,810
19	26	26	Johnny Benson Jr.	Roush Racing	Ford	198	0	running	106	$41,385
20	23	60	Geoff Bodine	Joe Bessey Racing	Chevrolet	198	0	running	103	$43,675
21	19	55	Kenny Wallace	Andy Petree Racing	Chevrolet	198	0	running	100	$45,910
22	7	40	Sterling Marlin	Team SABCO	Chevrolet	197	0	running	97	$40,735
23	37	5	Terry Labonte	Hendrick Motorsports	Chevrolet	197	0	running	94	$40,485
24	41	45	Rich Bickle	Tyler Jet Motorsports	Pontiac	197	0	running	91	$33,530
25	32	75	Ted Musgrave	Butch Mock Motorsports	Ford	197	0	running	88	$40,255
26	20	9	Jerry Nadeau	Melling Racing	Ford	197	0	running	85	$39,705
27	39	44	Kyle Petty	Petty Enterprises	Pontiac	197	0	running	82	$40,355
28	34	97	Chad Little	Roush Racing	Ford	197	0	running	79	$39,180
29	31	16	Kevin Lepage	Roush Racing	Ford	197	0	running	76	$39,030
30	40	11	Brett Bodine	Brett Bodine Racing	Ford	197	0	running	73	$31,980
31	38	4	Bobby Hamilton	Morgan–McClure Motorsports	Chevrolet	197	0	running	70	$28,730
32	27	30	Derrike Cope	Bahari Racing	Pontiac	197	0	running	67	$28,570
33	21	93	Dave Blaney	Bill Davis Racing	Pontiac	197	0	running	64	$28,645
34	9	42	Joe Nemechek	Team SABCO	Chevrolet	197	0	running	61	$28,270
35	42	41	David Green	Larry Hedrick Motorsports	Chevrolet	197	0	running	58	$35,120
36	36	21	Elliott Sadler (R)	Wood Brothers Racing	Ford	197	0	running	55	$28,005
37	30	98	Rick Mast	Cale Yarborough Motorsports	Ford	196	0	running	52	$34,895
38	35	10	Ricky Rudd	Rudd Performance Motorsports	Ford	196	0	running	49	$27,785
39	25	66	Darrell Waltrip	Haas-Carter Motorsports	Ford	195	0	running	46	$31,275
40	43	58	Loy Allen Jr.	SBIII Motorsports	Ford	195	0	running	43	$27,565
41	5	94	Bill Elliott	Bill Elliott Racing	Ford	193	6	running	45	$34,455
42	22	77	Robert Pressley	Jasper Motorsports	Ford	188	0	running	37	$34,345
43	29	23	Jimmy Spencer	Haas-Carter Motorsports	Ford	159	0	engine	34	$28,435
Failed to qualify
44		71	Dave Marcis	Marcis Auto Racing	Chevrolet					
45		90	Hut Stricklin	Donlavey Racing	Ford					
46		00	Buckshot Jones (R)	Buckshot Racing	Pontiac					
Official race results

== Media ==
=== Television ===
The Kmart 400 was covered by CBS in the United States for the seventeenth straight year. Mike Joy, two-time NASCAR Cup Series champion Ned Jarrett and 1979 race winner Buddy Baker called the race from the broadcast booth. Dick Berggren, Ralph Sheheen and Bill Stephens handled pit road for the television side. Ken Squier would serve as host.

CBS
Host	Booth announcers		Pit reporters
Host	Lap-by-lap	Color-commentators	Pit reporters
Ken Squier	Mike Joy	Ned Jarrett; Buddy Baker	Dick Berggren; Ralph Sheheen; Bill Stephens

Previous race: 1999 MBNA Platinum 400	NASCAR Winston Cup Series; 1999 season	Next race: 1999 Pocono 500
