= 1999 Pocono 500 =

Race details
- Race 15 of 34 in the 1999 NASCAR Winston Cup Series
- Date: June 20, 1999
- Location: Long Pond, Pennsylvania
- Course: Permanent racing facility
- Course length: 2.5 miles (4.023 km)
- Distance: 200 laps, 500 mi (804.672 km)
- Average speed: 118.898 miles per hour (191.348 km/h)

Pole position
Driver	Sterling Marlin	Team SABCO

Most laps led
Driver	Dale Jarrett	Robert Yates Racing
- Laps: 71

Winner
No. 18	Bobby Labonte	Joe Gibbs Racing

Television in the United States
- Network: TNN
- Announcers: Eli Gold, Buddy Baker, and Dick Berggren

The 1999 Pocono 500 was a NASCAR Winston Cup Series race that took place on June 20, 1999, at Pocono Raceway in Long Pond, Pennsylvania. This was the fifteenth race on the 1999 NASCAR Winston Cup Series schedule.

== Background ==
Pocono Raceway was built in 1969 with the first races run in 1971. The first NASCAR race was run in 1974. Pocono is a two-and-a-half mile triangular shaped racetrack with three distinct turns, all modeled after famous IndyCar tracks. Turn one has 14 degrees of banking and is modeled at the now-defunct Trenton Speedway. The "Long Pond Straightaway" connects turns one and two. Turn two, named "tunnel turn," has 9 degrees of banking and is modeled after the Indianapolis Motor Speedway. Turn three has 6 degrees of banking and is modeled after the Milwaukee Mile.

Failed to qualify: Hut Stricklin (#90), Loy Allen Jr. (#58), Derrike Cope (#30)

== Race report ==
There were several hard crashes in this race. Rusty Wallace lost a tire on lap 7 and went straight into the turn one wall around 200 mph. Dave Marcis crashed heavily in turn two on lap 92, went up in the air, and was almost thrown from the car if not for the window net. Both Waltrip brothers crashed in turn one late in the race, shortening up the rear ends of their cars.

Local favorite Jimmy Spencer had a great shot of winning his third Winston Cup race, taking the lead on lap 172. However, on lap 185, Spencer went up the racetrack in the tunnel turn and hit the wall due to oil on the track. He lost the lead to eventual winner Bobby Labonte and Spencer never recovered.

== Timeline ==
- Start: Sterling Marlin leads the field to the green flag.
- Lap 3: The first caution came out when Wally Dallenbach Jr. lost control in the short chute and spun out, collecting Jeff Burton who ended up hitting the wall.
- Lap 7: Rusty Wallace blew a tire and went straight into the turn 1 wall at high speed, causing the second caution.
- Lap 47: Chad Little spun out while entering pit road for a green flag pit stop. He made contact with the pit wall and knocked several pieces of equipment. No caution was thrown.
- Lap 70: Third caution is flown for debris.
- Lap 92: Dave Marcis crashed in the tunnel turn, causing the fourth caution. It was one of the hardest hits ever seen at Pocono. It was with such violence that Dave's helmet tried to come out of the window net. Dave was shaken but uninjured.
- Lap 102: Robert Pressley crashed in turn 1, causing the fifth caution.
- Lap 130: Kenny Irwin Jr. slowed to avoid Terry Labonte, got turned from behind by Michael Waltrip, and spun out exiting turn 2, causing the sixth caution.
- Lap 148: David Green stalled in turn 3, causing the seventh caution.
- Lap 154: Michael Waltrip hit the wall very hard in turn 1, causing the eight caution. Ted Musgrave spun out in the aftermath.
- Lap 167: Steve Park ran into Darrell Waltrip, who crashed very hard in turn 1, causing the ninth caution.
- Lap 186: Bill Elliott dropped oil on track, causing the ninth caution.
- Lap 194: Ward Burton, Johnny Benson Jr., and John Andretti crashed exiting turn 2, causing the 11th and final caution of the day.
- Lap 200: Bobby Labonte takes the checkered flag.

== Results ==
Pos	Grid	No.	Driver	Team	Manufacturer	Laps	Laps led	Status	Points
1	3	18	Bobby Labonte	Joe Gibbs Racing	Pontiac	200	27	Running	180
2	17	24	Jeff Gordon	Hendrick Motorsports	Chevrolet	200	10	Running	175
3	2	88	Dale Jarrett	Robert Yates Racing	Ford	200	71	Running	175
4	1	40	Sterling Marlin	Team SABCO	Chevrolet	200	2	Running	165
5	10	6	Mark Martin	Roush Racing	Ford	200	32	Running	160
6	12	20	Tony Stewart	Joe Gibbs Racing	Pontiac	200	1	Running	155
7	25	3	Dale Earnhardt	Richard Childress Racing	Chevrolet	200	0	Running	146
8	34	36	Ernie Irvan	MB2 Motorsports	Pontiac	200	0	Running	142
9	23	12	Jeremy Mayfield	Penske-Kranefuss Racing	Ford	200	18	Running	143
10	11	4	Bobby Hamilton	Morgan–McClure Motorsports	Chevrolet	200	0	Running	134
11	15	75	Ted Musgrave	RahMoc Enterprises	Ford	200	0	Running	130
12	5	98	Rick Mast	Cale Yarborough Motorsports	Ford	200	7	Running	132
13	18	1	Steve Park	Dale Earnhardt, Inc.	Chevrolet	200	0	Running	124
14	40	23	Jimmy Spencer	Haas-Carter Motorsports	Ford	200	14	Running	126
15	16	10	Ricky Rudd	Rudd Performance Motorsports	Ford	200	0	Running	118
16	33	5	Terry Labonte	Hendrick Motorsports	Chevrolet	200	0	Running	115
17	31	16	Kevin Lepage	Roush Racing	Ford	200	0	Running	112
18	29	28	Kenny Irwin Jr.	Robert Yates Racing	Ford	200	0	Running	109
19	39	44	Kyle Petty	Petty Enterprises	Pontiac	199	0	Running	106
20	42	21	Elliott Sadler	Wood Brothers Racing	Ford	199	0	Running	103
21	26	01	Jeff Green	Team SABCO	Chevrolet	199	0	Running	100
22	24	31	Mike Skinner	Richard Childress Racing	Chevrolet	199	3	Running	102
23	30	9	Jerry Nadeau	Melling Racing	Ford	199	0	Running	94
24	36	45	Rich Bickle	Tyler Jet Motorsports	Pontiac	198	0	Running	91
25	21	55	Kenny Wallace	Andy Petree Racing	Chevrolet	198	0	Running	88
26	35	11	Brett Bodine	Brett Bodine Racing	Ford	198	0	Running	85
27	6	33	Ken Schrader	Andy Petree Racing	Chevrolet	196	0	Running	82
28	20	43	John Andretti	Petty Enterprises	Pontiac	196	1	Running	84
29	7	22	Ward Burton	Bill Davis Racing	Pontiac	193	13	Crash	81
30	38	26	Johnny Benson Jr.	Roush Racing	Ford	192	0	Crash	73
31	4	94	Bill Elliott	Bill Elliott Racing	Ford	185	0	Engine	70
32	37	97	Chad Little	Roush Racing	Ford	180	1	Running	72
33	41	60	Geoff Bodine	Joe Bessey Motorsports	Chevrolet	167	0	Rear axle	64
34	28	66	Darrell Waltrip	Haas-Carter Motorsports	Ford	165	0	Crash	61
35	43	77	Robert Pressley	Jasper Motorsports	Ford	164	0	Running	58
36	8	99	Jeff Burton	Roush Racing	Ford	154	0	Running	55
37	13	7	Michael Waltrip	Mattei Motorsports	Chevrolet	152	0	Crash	52
38	22	41	David Green	Larry Hedrick Motorsports	Chevrolet	145	0	Engine	49
39	9	25	Wally Dallenbach Jr.	Hendrick Motorsports	Chevrolet	139	0	Engine	46
40	27	91	Dick Trickle	LJ Racing	Chevrolet	109	0	Engine	43
41	32	71	Dave Marcis	Marcis Auto Racing	Chevrolet	87	0	Crash	40
42	19	42	Joe Nemechek	Team SABCO	Chevrolet	17	0	Engine	37
43	14	2	Rusty Wallace	Penske-Kranefuss Racing	Ford	7	0	Crash	34

== Post-race championship standings ==
Pos	Driver	Points	Differential
1	Dale Jarrett	2344	--
2	Bobby Labonte	2255	89
3	Jeff Burton	2158	186
4	Mark Martin	2153	191
5	Jeff Gordon	1995	349
6	Tony Stewart	1993	351
7	Dale Earnhardt	1869	475
8	Ward Burton	1819	575
9	Jeremy Mayfield	1784	560
10	Terry Labonte	1758	586

Preceded by 1999 Kmart 400	NASCAR Winston Cup Series; 1999	Succeeded by 1999 Save Mart/Kragen 350
