= 1999 MBNA Platinum 400 =

13th race of the 1999 NASCAR Winston Cup Series

Race details
- Race 13 of 34 in the 1999 NASCAR Winston Cup Series
- The 1999 MBNA Platinum 400 program cover.
- Date: June 6, 1999
- Official name: 31st Annual MBNA Platinum 400
- Location: Dover, Delaware, Dover International Speedway
- Course: Permanent racing facility
- Course length: 1 miles (1.6 km)
- Distance: 400 laps, 400 mi (643.737 km)
- Average speed: 120.603 miles per hour (194.092 km/h)

Pole position
Driver	Bobby Labonte	Joe Gibbs Racing
- Time: 22.596

Most laps led
Driver	Tony Stewart	Joe Gibbs Racing
- Laps: 127

Winner
No. 18	Bobby Labonte	Joe Gibbs Racing

Television in the United States
- Network: TNN
- Announcers: Eli Gold, Dick Berggren, Buddy Baker

Radio in the United States
- Radio: Motor Racing Network

The 1999 MBNA Platinum 400 was the 13th stock car race of the 1999 NASCAR Winston Cup Series season and the 31st iteration of the event. The race was held on Sunday, June 6, 1999, in Dover, Delaware at Dover International Speedway, a 1-mile (1.6 km) permanent oval-shaped racetrack. The race took the scheduled 400 laps to complete. Depending on fuel mileage, Joe Gibbs Racing driver Bobby Labonte would manage to save enough fuel to almost lap the field to win his eighth career NASCAR Winston Cup Series victory and his first of the season. To fill out the podium, Hendrick Motorsports driver Jeff Gordon and Roush Racing driver Mark Martin would finish second and third, respectively.

== Background ==
The layout of Dover International Speedway, the venue where the race was held.

Dover International Speedway is an oval race track in Dover, Delaware, United States that has held at least two NASCAR races since it opened in 1969. In addition to NASCAR, the track also hosted USAC and the NTT IndyCar Series. The track features one layout, a 1-mile (1.6 km) concrete oval, with 24° banking in the turns and 9° banking on the straights. The speedway is owned and operated by Dover Motorsports.

The track, nicknamed "The Monster Mile", was built in 1969 by Melvin Joseph of Melvin L. Joseph Construction Company, Inc., with an asphalt surface, but was replaced with concrete in 1995. Six years later in 2001, the track's capacity moved to 135,000 seats, making the track have the largest capacity of sports venue in the mid-Atlantic. In 2002, the name changed to Dover International Speedway from Dover Downs International Speedway after Dover Downs Gaming and Entertainment split, making Dover Motorsports. From 2007 to 2009, the speedway worked on an improvement project called "The Monster Makeover", which expanded facilities at the track and beautified the track. After the 2014 season, the track's capacity was reduced to 95,500 seats.

=== Entry list ===
- (R) denotes rookie driver.

#	Driver	Team	Make
00	Buckshot Jones (R)	Buckshot Racing	Pontiac
1	Steve Park	Dale Earnhardt, Inc.	Chevrolet
2	Rusty Wallace	Penske-Kranefuss Racing	Ford
3	Dale Earnhardt	Richard Childress Racing	Chevrolet
4	Bobby Hamilton	Morgan–McClure Motorsports	Chevrolet
5	Terry Labonte	Hendrick Motorsports	Chevrolet
6	Mark Martin	Roush Racing	Ford
7	Michael Waltrip	Mattei Motorsports	Chevrolet
9	Jerry Nadeau	Melling Racing	Ford
10	Ricky Rudd	Rudd Performance Motorsports	Ford
11	Brett Bodine	Brett Bodine Racing	Ford
12	Jeremy Mayfield	Penske-Kranefuss Racing	Ford
16	Kevin Lepage	Roush Racing	Ford
18	Bobby Labonte	Joe Gibbs Racing	Pontiac
20	Tony Stewart (R)	Joe Gibbs Racing	Pontiac
21	Elliott Sadler (R)	Wood Brothers Racing	Ford
22	Ward Burton	Bill Davis Racing	Pontiac
23	Jimmy Spencer	Haas-Carter Motorsports	Ford
24	Jeff Gordon	Hendrick Motorsports	Chevrolet
25	Wally Dallenbach Jr.	Hendrick Motorsports	Chevrolet
26	Johnny Benson Jr.	Roush Racing	Ford
28	Kenny Irwin Jr.	Robert Yates Racing	Ford
30	Derrike Cope	Bahari Racing	Pontiac
31	Mike Skinner	Richard Childress Racing	Chevrolet
33	Ken Schrader	Andy Petree Racing	Chevrolet
36	Ernie Irvan	MB2 Motorsports	Pontiac
40	Sterling Marlin	Team SABCO	Chevrolet
41	David Green	Larry Hedrick Motorsports	Chevrolet
42	Joe Nemechek	Team SABCO	Chevrolet
43	John Andretti	Petty Enterprises	Pontiac
44	Kyle Petty	Petty Enterprises	Pontiac
45	Rich Bickle	Tyler Jet Motorsports	Pontiac
55	Kenny Wallace	Andy Petree Racing	Chevrolet
58	Ricky Craven	SBIII Motorsports	Ford
60	Geoff Bodine	Joe Bessey Racing	Chevrolet
66	Darrell Waltrip	Haas-Carter Motorsports	Ford
71	Dave Marcis	Marcis Auto Racing	Chevrolet
75	Ted Musgrave	Butch Mock Motorsports	Ford
77	Robert Pressley	Jasper Motorsports	Ford
88	Dale Jarrett	Robert Yates Racing	Ford
90	Hut Stricklin	Donlavey Racing	Ford
91	Dick Trickle	LJ Racing	Chevrolet
94	Bill Elliott	Bill Elliott Racing	Ford
97	Chad Little	Roush Racing	Ford
98	Rick Mast	Cale Yarborough Motorsports	Ford
99	Jeff Burton	Roush Racing	Ford
Official entry list

== Practice ==
=== First practice ===
The first practice session was held on Friday, June 4, at 11:00 a.m. EST. The session would last for one hour. Kenny Wallace, driving for Andy Petree Racing, would set the fastest time in the session, with a lap of 22.678 and an average speed of 158.744 mph (255.474 km/h).

Pos.	#	Driver	Team	Make	Time	Speed
1	55	Kenny Wallace	Andy Petree Racing	Chevrolet	22.678	158.744
2	12	Jeremy Mayfield	Penske-Kranefuss Racing	Ford	22.736	158.339
3	31	Mike Skinner	Richard Childress Racing	Chevrolet	22.739	158.318
Full first practice results

=== Second practice ===
The second practice session was held on Friday, June 4, at 1:20 p.m. EST. The session would last for 40 minutes. Mark Martin, driving for Roush Racing, would set the fastest time in the session, with a lap of 22.677 and an average speed of 158.751 mph (255.485 km/h).

Pos.	#	Driver	Team	Make	Time	Speed
1	6	Mark Martin	Roush Racing	Ford	22.677	158.751
2	18	Bobby Labonte	Joe Gibbs Racing	Pontiac	22.717	158.472
3	12	Jeremy Mayfield	Penske-Kranefuss Racing	Ford	22.726	158.409
Full second practice results

=== Third practice ===
The third practice session was held on Saturday, June 5, at 9:30 a.m. EST. The session would last for one hour and 15 minutes. Dick Trickle, driving for LJ Racing, would set the fastest time in the session, with a lap of 23.100 and an average speed of 155.844 mph (250.807 km/h).

Pos.	#	Driver	Team	Make	Time	Speed
1	91	Dick Trickle	LJ Racing	Chevrolet	23.100	155.844
2	42	Joe Nemechek	Team SABCO	Chevrolet	23.116	155.736
3	60	Geoff Bodine	Joe Bessey Racing	Chevrolet	23.137	155.594
Full third practice results

=== Final practice ===
The final practice session, sometimes referred to as Happy Hour, was held on Saturday, June 5, after the preliminary 1999 MBNA Platinum 200. The session would last for one hour. Jeremy Mayfield, driving for Penske-Kranefuss Racing, would set the fastest time in the session, with a lap of 23.293 and an average speed of 154.552 mph (248.727 km/h).

During the session, Ernie Irvan would crash on the frontstretch, forcing Irvan to go to a backup car and to start at the rear for the race.

Pos.	#	Driver	Team	Make	Time	Speed
1	12	Jeremy Mayfield	Penske-Kranefuss Racing	Ford	23.293	154.552
2	2	Rusty Wallace	Penske-Kranefuss Racing	Ford	23.351	154.168
3	44	Kyle Petty	Petty Enterprises	Pontiac	23.403	153.826
Full Happy Hour practice results

== Qualifying ==
Qualifying was split into two rounds. The first round was held on Friday, June 4, at 3:30 p.m. EST. Each driver would have one lap to set a time. During the first round, the top 25 drivers in the round would be guaranteed a starting spot in the race. If a driver was not able to guarantee a spot in the first round, they had the option to scrub their time from the first round and try and run a faster lap time in a second round qualifying run, held on Saturday, June 5, at 11:30 a.m. EST. As with the first round, each driver would have one lap to set a time. Positions 26-36 would be decided on time, while positions 37-43 would be based on provisionals. Six spots are awarded by the use of provisionals based on owner's points. The seventh is awarded to a past champion who has not otherwise qualified for the race. If no past champion needs the provisional, the next team in the owner points will be awarded a provisional.

Bobby Labonte, driving for Joe Gibbs Racing, would win the pole, setting a time of 22.596 and an average speed of 159.320 miles per hour (256.401 km/h).

Three drivers would fail to qualify: Darrell Waltrip, Buckshot Jones, and Hut Stricklin.

=== Full qualifying results ===
Pos.	#	Driver	Team	Make	Time	Speed
1	18	Bobby Labonte	Joe Gibbs Racing	Pontiac	22.596	159.320
2	88	Dale Jarrett	Robert Yates Racing	Ford	22.702	158.576
3	6	Mark Martin	Roush Racing	Ford	22.738	158.325
4	55	Kenny Wallace	Andy Petree Racing	Chevrolet	22.764	158.144
5	16	Kevin Lepage	Roush Racing	Ford	22.795	157.929
6	44	Kyle Petty	Petty Enterprises	Pontiac	22.811	157.819
7	94	Bill Elliott	Bill Elliott Racing	Ford	22.825	157.722
8	2	Rusty Wallace	Penske-Kranefuss Racing	Ford	22.827	157.708
9	12	Jeremy Mayfield	Penske-Kranefuss Racing	Ford	22.849	157.556
10	31	Mike Skinner	Richard Childress Racing	Chevrolet	22.859	157.487
11	21	Elliott Sadler (R)	Wood Brothers Racing	Ford	22.863	157.460
12	43	John Andretti	Petty Enterprises	Pontiac	22.868	157.425
13	9	Jerry Nadeau	Melling Racing	Ford	22.891	157.267
14	24	Jeff Gordon	Hendrick Motorsports	Chevrolet	22.895	157.240
15	22	Ward Burton	Bill Davis Racing	Pontiac	22.910	157.137
16	33	Ken Schrader	Andy Petree Racing	Chevrolet	22.912	157.123
17	41	David Green	Larry Hedrick Motorsports	Chevrolet	22.912	157.123
18	25	Wally Dallenbach Jr.	Hendrick Motorsports	Chevrolet	22.952	156.849
19	28	Kenny Irwin Jr.	Robert Yates Racing	Ford	22.958	156.808
20	11	Brett Bodine	Brett Bodine Racing	Ford	22.970	156.726
21	97	Chad Little	Roush Racing	Ford	22.975	156.692
22	98	Rick Mast	Cale Yarborough Motorsports	Ford	22.994	156.563
23	10	Ricky Rudd	Rudd Performance Motorsports	Ford	23.003	156.501
24	20	Tony Stewart (R)	Joe Gibbs Racing	Pontiac	23.006	156.481
25	7	Michael Waltrip	Mattei Motorsports	Chevrolet	23.020	156.386
26	91	Dick Trickle	LJ Racing	Chevrolet	22.915	157.102
27	42	Joe Nemechek	Team SABCO	Chevrolet	22.989	156.597
28	26	Johnny Benson Jr.	Roush Racing	Ford	23.020	156.386
29	36	Ernie Irvan	MB2 Motorsports	Pontiac	23.022	156.372
30	30	Derrike Cope	Bahari Racing	Pontiac	23.035	156.284
31	1	Steve Park	Dale Earnhardt, Inc.	Chevrolet	23.048	156.196
32	60	Geoff Bodine	Joe Bessey Racing	Chevrolet	23.060	156.114
33	40	Sterling Marlin	Team SABCO	Chevrolet	23.061	156.108
34	3	Dale Earnhardt	Richard Childress Racing	Chevrolet	23.066	156.074
35	4	Bobby Hamilton	Morgan–McClure Motorsports	Chevrolet	23.068	156.060
36	75	Ted Musgrave	Butch Mock Motorsports	Ford	23.083	155.959
Provisionals
37	99	Jeff Burton	Roush Racing	Ford	-*	-*
38	5	Terry Labonte	Hendrick Motorsports	Chevrolet	-*	-*
39	23	Jimmy Spencer	Haas-Carter Motorsports	Ford	-*	-*
40	45	Rich Bickle	Tyler Jet Motorsports	Pontiac	-*	-*
41	77	Robert Pressley	Jasper Motorsports	Ford	-*	-*
42	58	Ricky Craven	SBIII Motorsports	Ford	-*	-*
43	71	Dave Marcis	Marcis Auto Racing	Chevrolet	-*	-*
Failed to qualify
44	66	Darrell Waltrip	Haas-Carter Motorsports	Ford	23.378	153.991
45	00	Buckshot Jones (R)	Buckshot Racing	Pontiac	23.467	153.407
46	90	Hut Stricklin	Donlavey Racing	Ford	23.779	151.394
Official first round qualifying results
Official starting lineup

== Race results ==
Fin	St	#	Driver	Team	Make	Laps	Led	Status	Pts	Winnings
1	1	18	Bobby Labonte	Joe Gibbs Racing	Pontiac	400	44	running	180	$144,820
2	14	24	Jeff Gordon	Hendrick Motorsports	Chevrolet	400	104	running	175	$96,805
3	3	6	Mark Martin	Roush Racing	Ford	399	100	running	170	$77,480
4	24	20	Tony Stewart (R)	Joe Gibbs Racing	Pontiac	399	127	running	170	$63,205
5	2	88	Dale Jarrett	Robert Yates Racing	Ford	399	21	running	160	$67,745
6	8	2	Rusty Wallace	Penske-Kranefuss Racing	Ford	399	0	running	150	$56,830
7	28	26	Johnny Benson Jr.	Roush Racing	Ford	399	3	running	151	$52,860
8	37	99	Jeff Burton	Roush Racing	Ford	399	0	running	142	$56,535
9	9	12	Jeremy Mayfield	Penske-Kranefuss Racing	Ford	398	0	out of fuel	138	$50,335
10	19	28	Kenny Irwin Jr.	Robert Yates Racing	Ford	398	0	running	134	$56,275
11	34	3	Dale Earnhardt	Richard Childress Racing	Chevrolet	398	0	running	130	$49,510
12	7	94	Bill Elliott	Bill Elliott Racing	Ford	397	0	running	127	$48,660
13	12	43	John Andretti	Petty Enterprises	Pontiac	397	0	running	124	$53,420
14	23	10	Ricky Rudd	Rudd Performance Motorsports	Ford	397	0	running	121	$45,210
15	32	60	Geoff Bodine	Joe Bessey Racing	Chevrolet	396	0	running	118	$37,310
16	31	1	Steve Park	Dale Earnhardt, Inc.	Chevrolet	396	0	running	115	$42,310
17	38	5	Terry Labonte	Hendrick Motorsports	Chevrolet	396	0	running	112	$47,265
18	17	41	David Green	Larry Hedrick Motorsports	Chevrolet	396	0	running	109	$34,810
19	10	31	Mike Skinner	Richard Childress Racing	Chevrolet	396	0	running	106	$41,385
20	18	25	Wally Dallenbach Jr.	Hendrick Motorsports	Chevrolet	396	0	running	103	$43,675
21	35	4	Bobby Hamilton	Morgan–McClure Motorsports	Chevrolet	395	0	running	100	$45,910
22	15	22	Ward Burton	Bill Davis Racing	Pontiac	395	0	running	97	$40,735
23	39	23	Jimmy Spencer	Haas-Carter Motorsports	Ford	395	0	running	94	$40,485
24	36	75	Ted Musgrave	Butch Mock Motorsports	Ford	395	0	running	91	$33,530
25	27	42	Joe Nemechek	Team SABCO	Chevrolet	395	0	running	88	$40,255
26	5	16	Kevin Lepage	Roush Racing	Ford	394	0	running	85	$39,705
27	11	21	Elliott Sadler (R)	Wood Brothers Racing	Ford	394	0	running	82	$40,355
28	21	97	Chad Little	Roush Racing	Ford	394	0	running	79	$39,180
29	33	40	Sterling Marlin	Team SABCO	Chevrolet	393	1	running	81	$39,030
30	13	9	Jerry Nadeau	Melling Racing	Ford	393	0	out of fuel	73	$31,980
31	42	58	Ricky Craven	SBIII Motorsports	Ford	392	0	running	70	$28,730
32	6	44	Kyle Petty	Petty Enterprises	Pontiac	392	0	running	67	$28,570
33	40	45	Rich Bickle	Tyler Jet Motorsports	Pontiac	392	0	running	64	$28,645
34	22	98	Rick Mast	Cale Yarborough Motorsports	Ford	391	0	running	61	$28,270
35	29	36	Ernie Irvan	MB2 Motorsports	Pontiac	391	0	running	58	$35,120
36	30	30	Derrike Cope	Bahari Racing	Pontiac	389	0	running	55	$28,005
37	20	11	Brett Bodine	Brett Bodine Racing	Ford	358	0	running	52	$34,895
38	43	71	Dave Marcis	Marcis Auto Racing	Chevrolet	307	0	overheating	49	$27,785
39	4	55	Kenny Wallace	Andy Petree Racing	Chevrolet	289	0	crash	46	$31,275
40	41	77	Robert Pressley	Jasper Motorsports	Ford	255	0	electrical	43	$27,565
41	16	33	Ken Schrader	Andy Petree Racing	Chevrolet	132	0	running	40	$34,455
42	25	7	Michael Waltrip	Mattei Motorsports	Chevrolet	99	0	engine	37	$34,345
43	26	91	Dick Trickle	LJ Racing	Chevrolet	6	0	crash	34	$28,435
Failed to qualify
44		66	Darrell Waltrip	Haas-Carter Motorsports	Ford					
45		00	Buckshot Jones (R)	Buckshot Racing	Pontiac					
46		90	Hut Stricklin	Donlavey Racing	Ford					
Official race results

Previous race: 1999 Coca-Cola 600	NASCAR Winston Cup Series; 1999 season	Next race: 1999 Kmart 400
