= 1998 NAPA 500 =

Race details
- Race 33 of 33 in the 1998 NASCAR Winston Cup Series season
- Atlanta Motor Speedway (1997-present configuration)
- Date: November 8, 1998
- Official name: NAPA 500
- Location: Atlanta Motor Speedway, Hampton, Georgia
- Course: Permanent racing facility
- Course length: 1.54 miles (2.502 km)
- Distance: 221 laps, 340.34 mi (547.724 km)
- Scheduled distance: 325 laps, 500.5 mi (805.477 km)
- Average speed: 114.915 miles per hour (184.938 km/h)

Pole position
Driver	Kenny Irwin Jr.	Robert Yates Racing
- Time: 28.657 seconds

Most laps led
Driver	Jeff Gordon	Hendrick Motorsports
- Laps: 113

Winner
No. 24	Jeff Gordon	Hendrick Motorsports

Television in the United States
- Network: ESPN
- Announcers: Bob Jenkins; Benny Parsons; Ned Jarrett

The 1998 NAPA 500 was the 33rd and final championship event of the 1998 season of the NASCAR Winston Cup Series, held on November 8, 1998, at Atlanta Motor Speedway in Hampton, Georgia. Won by series champion Jeff Gordon, the race was delayed both before its start and twice during the race due to rain showers, causing it to be shortened to 221 laps from its scheduled distance of 325 laps.

== Background ==
Atlanta Motor Speedway is one of ten intermediate to hold NASCAR races. The standard track at Atlanta Motor Speedway is a four-turn quad-oval track that is 1.54 miles (2.48 km) long. The track's turns are banked at twenty-four degrees, while the front stretch, the location of the finish line, and the back stretch are banked at five. The scheduled race distance was 325 laps, totalling 500.5 miles (805.5 km).

Going into the race, Jeff Gordon had clinched the 1998 Winston Cup Series championship the previous weekend at Rockingham Speedway, winning the AC Delco 400 for his 12th win of the season. Rookie driver Harris DeVane, a regular on the ARCA Racing Series, attempted to make his Winston Cup Series debut at the event.

The support race for the event, run on Saturday afternoon, was a 102-lap event sanctioned by the ARCA Bondo/Mar-Hyde Series; Mike Swaim Jr. was the winner of the race.

== Qualifying ==
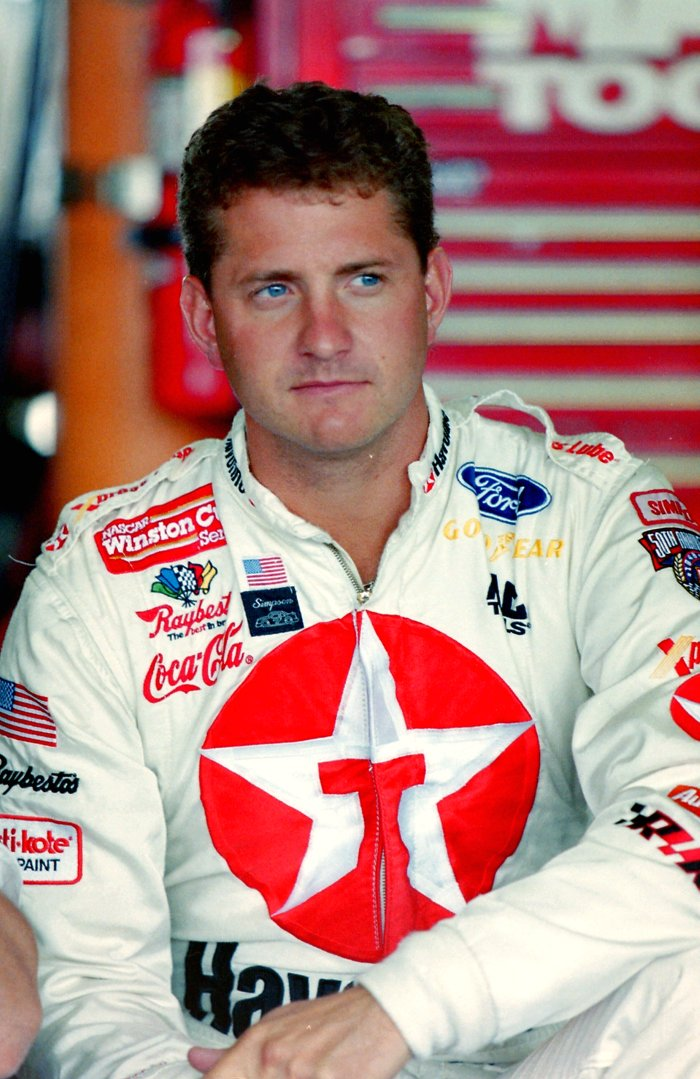
Race polesitter Kenny Irwin Jr.

Series rookie Kenny Irwin Jr., driving the No. 28 Ford Taurus for Robert Yates Racing, led 48 drivers in qualifying on Friday, November 6, winning his first pole position in the Winston Cup Series. Irwin's qualifying time was 193.461 miles per hour (311.345 km/h). Ward Burton qualified second in the No. 22 Bill Davis Racing Pontiac; Dale Jarrett, Mark Martin, and Mike Skinner filled out the remainder of the top five positions in qualifying; the top 25 drivers in the session were locked into the field, with Ted Musgrave as the 25th and final driver guaranteed a starting spot at the end of the first day of time trials.

Second round qualifying, to set starting positions 26th through 36th on the grid, was held on Saturday, November 7. Gary Bradberry set the fastest time in the session at a speed of 189.922 mph (305.650 km/h); he had crashed in the first round of qualifying, and was forced to use a backup car for the rest of the race weekend. The only other driver to make an attempt in second round qualifying and move into the top 36 positions, qualifying for the race, was Kevin Lepage, whose time placed him 31st overall.

Dale Earnhardt, Terry Labonte, Ricky Craven, Johnny Benson Jr., Kyle Petty, and Rusty Wallace were forced to take provisional starting positions to start the race. Darrell Waltrip received a provisional as a past series champion and started 43rd; it was the 20th provisional he had used over the course of the season, resulting in a change to eligibility rules for the 1999 series season. Failing to qualify for the race were Rick Mast, Rich Bickle, Steve Grissom, Andy Hillenburg, and Harris DeVane; DeVane was injured in a crash on his qualifying lap and had to be cut from his car, being taken to a hospital as a precautionary measure.

== Race ==
The start of the race, scheduled for 12:40PM, was delayed 49 minutes due to rain. During the race two additional red flags for rain caused delays of 6 hours and 39 minutes. The delays resulted in the race being the first night race held at the speedway. Due to the delays, during a yellow flag thrown on lap 190 to allow teams to pit under caution on the still-damp pit road, NASCAR announced that once the race resumed, there would be only 25 laps remaining from that point, citing a desire for fans to be able to return home at a safe hour; the race concluded at 11:07pm, a crowd of 50,000 having remained to watch the race to its conclusion.

From a starting position of 21st, Gordon led 113 of the race's 221 laps; he beat Dale Jarrett for the race win by 0.739 second. His victory, the 13th on the season, tied Richard Petty for the most wins by a driver in a single season. Including the rain delays, there were a total of five caution periods during the race, with 68 laps being run under the yellow flag. Gordon's average speed was 114.915 mph (184.938 km/h), and he received $164,450 (about $324,837 today) for the victory.

Gordon's career victory total stood at 42 after the race; at the time, he was the youngest driver to pass 40 career wins, and the youngest to win a third series title. Gordon topped Mark Martin for the series title by 364 points; Irwin was named the series' Rookie of the Year immediately following the race, beating Kevin Lepage by 14 rookie points.

While the race was the final points event of the season for the Winston Cup Series, an exhibition race at Mobility Resort Motegi in Japan was held two weeks later, won by Mike Skinner over Gordon.

== Results ==
=== Qualifying ===
No.	Driver	Team	Manufacturer	Time	Speed	Grid
28	Kenny Irwin Jr. #	Robert Yates Racing	Ford	28.657	193.461	1
22	Ward Burton	Bill Davis Racing	Pontiac	28.666	193.400	2
88	Dale Jarrett	Robert Yates Racing	Ford	28.713	193.083	3
6	Mark Martin	Roush Racing	Ford	28.858	192.113	4
31	Mike Skinner	Richard Childress Racing	Chevrolet	28.859	192.106	5
30	Derrike Cope	Bahari Racing	Pontiac	28.886	191.927	6
18	Bobby Labonte	Joe Gibbs Racing	Pontiac	28.936	191.595	7
90	Dick Trickle	Donlavey Racing	Ford	28.940	191.569	8
12	Jeremy Mayfield	Penske-Kranefuss Racing	Ford	28.950	191.503	10
42	Joe Nemechek	Team Sabco	Chevrolet	28.999	191.179	11
46	Jeff Green	Team Sabco	Chevrolet	29.028	190.988	12
33	Ken Schrader	Andy Petree Racing	Chevrolet	29.041	190.903	13
4	Bobby Hamilton	Morgan-McClure Motorsports	Chevrolet	29.101	190.509	14
11	Brett Bodine	Brett Bodine Racing	Ford	29.112	190.437	15
41	David Green	Larry Hedrick Motorsports	Chevrolet	29.114	190.424	16
1	Steve Park #	Dale Earnhardt, Inc.	Chevrolet	29.158	190.136	17
2	Rusty Wallace	Penske Racing South	Ford	29.177	190.013	18
9	Jerry Nadeau #	Melling Racing	Ford	29.180	189.993	19
91	Todd Bodine	LJ Racing	Chevrolet	29.180	189.993	20
24	Jeff Gordon	Hendrick Motorsports	Chevrolet	29.182	189.980	21
97	Chad Little	Roush Racing	Ford	29.220	189.733	22
23	Jimmy Spencer	Travis Carter Enterprises	Ford	29.230	189.668	23
40	Sterling Marlin	Team Sabco	Chevrolet	29.233	189.649	24
13	Ted Musgrave	Elliott-Marino Racing	Ford	29.250	189.538	25
78	Gary Bradberry	Triad Motorsports	Ford	29.191	189.922	26‡
94	Bill Elliott	Bill Elliott Racing	Ford	29.257	189.493	27
21	Michael Waltrip	Wood Brothers Racing	Ford	29.261	189.467	28
50	Wally Dallenbach Jr.	Hendrick Motorsports	Chevrolet	29.265	189.441	29
71	Dave Marcis	Marcis Auto Racing	Chevrolet	29.273	189.390	30
16	Kevin Lepage #	Roush Racing	Ford	29.284	189.318	31
8	Morgan Shepherd	Stavola Brothers Racing	Chevrolet	29.302	189.202	32
77	Robert Pressley	Jasper Motorsports	Ford	29.311	189.144	33
10	Ricky Rudd	Rudd Performance Motorsports	Ford	29.314	189.125	34
99	Jeff Burton	Roush Racing	Ford	29.322	189.073	35
43	John Andretti	Petty Enterprises	Pontiac	29.340	188.957	36
3	Dale Earnhardt	Richard Childress Racing	Chevrolet	Provisional		37
5	Terry Labonte	Hendrick Motorsports	Chevrolet	Provisional		38
36	Ricky Craven	MB2 Motorsports	Pontiac	Provisional		39
26	Johnny Benson Jr.	Roush Racing	Ford	Provisional		40
44	Kyle Petty	PE2	Pontiac	Provisional		41
81	Kenny Wallace	FILMAR Racing	Ford	Provisional		42
35	Darrell Waltrip	Tyler Jet Motorsports	Pontiac	Past Champion		43
Failed to Qualify
75	Rick Mast	RahMoc Enterprises	Ford	29.356	188.854	
98	Rich Bickle	Cale Yarborough Racing	T-Bird	29.477	188.079	
96	Steve Grissom	American Equipment Racing	Chevrolet	29.935	185.201	
80	Andy Hillenburg	Hover Motorsports	Ford	30.298	182.982	
08	Harris DeVane	Highland Timber Racing	Chevrolet	Crash		
# Rookie of the Year candidate / ‡ Fastest second round qualifier Source:

=== Race results ===
Pos	Grid	No.	Driver	Team	Manufacturer	Laps	Points
1	21	24	Jeff Gordon	Hendrick Motorsports	Chevrolet	221	185^{2}
2	3	88	Dale Jarrett	Robert Yates Racing	Ford	221	175^{1}
3	4	6	Mark Martin	Roush Racing	Ford	221	165
4	35	99	Jeff Burton	Roush Racing	Ford	221	160
5	20	91	Todd Bodine	LJ Racing	Chevrolet	221	155
6	14	4	Bobby Hamilton	Morgan-McClure Motorsports	Chevrolet	221	150
7	13	33	Ken Schrader	Andy Petree Racing	Chevrolet	221	146
8	38	5	Terry Labonte	Hendrick Motorsports	Chevrolet	221	142
9	5	31	Mike Skinner	Richard Childress Racing	Chevrolet	221	143^{1}
10	10	7	Geoff Bodine	Geoff Bodine Racing	Ford	221	134
11	22	97	Chad Little	Roush Racing	Ford	221	130
12	8	90	Dick Trickle	Donlavey Racing	Ford	221	127
13	37	3	Dale Earnhardt	Richard Childress Racing	Chevrolet	221	124
14	2	22	Ward Burton	Bill Davis Racing	Pontiac	221	126^{1}
15	9	12	Jeremy Mayfield	Penske-Kranefuss Racing	Ford	221	118
16	1	28	Kenny Irwin Jr. #	Robert Yates Racing	Ford	221	120^{1}
17	17	1	Steve Park #	Dale Earnhardt, Inc.	Chevrolet	221	112
18	31	16	Kevin Lepage #	Roush Racing	Ford	221	109
19	25	13	Ted Musgrave	Elliott-Marino Racing	Ford	221	106
20	18	2	Rusty Wallace	Penske Racing South	Ford	221	103
21	23	23	Jimmy Spencer	Travis Carter Enterprises	Ford	221	100
22	28	21	Michael Waltrip	Wood Brothers Racing	Ford	221	97
23	40	26	Johnny Benson Jr.	Roush Racing	Ford	221	94
24	34	10	Ricky Rudd	Rudd Performance Motorsports	Ford	221	91
25	39	36	Ricky Craven	MB2 Motorsports	Pontiac	221	88
26	27	94	Bill Elliott	Bill Elliott Racing	Ford	221	85
27	30	71	Dave Marcis	Marcis Auto Racing	Chevrolet	221	87^{1}
28	33	77	Robert Pressley	Jasper Motorsports	Ford	221	79
29	41	44	Kyle Petty	PE2	Pontiac	221	76
30	6	30	Derrike Cope	Bahari Racing	Pontiac	221	73
31	15	11	Brett Bodine	Brett Bodine Racing	Ford	221	75^{1}
32	36	43	John Andretti	Petty Enterprises	Pontiac	221	72^{1}
33	26	78	Gary Bradberry	Triad Motorsports	Ford	219	64
34	42	81	Kenny Wallace	FILMAR Racing	Ford	218	61
35	29	50	Wally Dallenbach Jr.	Hendrick Motorsports	Chevrolet	218	58
36	12	46	Jeff Green	Team Sabco	Chevrolet	216	55
37	19	9	Jerry Nadeau #	Melling Racing	Ford	217	52
38	43	35	Darrell Waltrip	Tyler Jet Motorsports	Pontiac	213	49
39	32	8	Morgan Shepherd	Stavola Brothers Racing	Chevrolet	197	46
40	11	42	Joe Nemechek	Team Sabco	Chevrolet	179	43
41	16	41	David Green	Larry Hedrick Motorsports	Chevrolet	155	40
42	24	40	Sterling Marlin	Team Sabco	Chevrolet	139	37
43	7	18	Bobby Labonte	Joe Gibbs Racing	Pontiac	134	34
# Rookie of the Year candidate / Source:
^{1} Includes five bonus points for leading a lap
^{2} Includes ten bonus points for leading the most laps
