= 1999 Save Mart/Kragen 350 =

Auto race at Sonoma in 1999

Race details
- Race 16 of 34 of in the 1999 NASCAR Winston Cup Series
- Date: June 27, 1999
- Location: Sears Point International Raceway, Sonoma, California, U.S.
- Course: Permanent racing facility
- Course length: 1.949 miles ( km)
- Distance: 112 laps, 218.28 mi ( km)
- Weather: Hot with temperatures approaching 88 °F (31 °C) with wind speeds reaching up to 13.8 miles per hour (22.2 km/h)

Pole position
Driver	Jeff Gordon	Hendrick Motorsports

Most laps led
Driver	Jeff Gordon	Hendrick Motorsports
- Laps: 80

Winner
No. 24	Jeff Gordon	Hendrick Motorsports

Television in the United States
- Network: ESPN
- Announcers: Bob Jenkins, Benny Parsons and Ned Jarrett

The 1999 Save Mart/Kragen 350 was a NASCAR Winston Cup Series race held at Sears Point Raceway, Sonoma, California on June 27, 1999. It was the 16th points-paying event of the 1999 NASCAR Winston Cup Series season. Jeff Gordon won the pole race for the second consecutive year. A total of 51 cars attempted the race.

== Summary ==
=== Results ===
Pos	Grid	Car	Driver	Team	Make	Laps	Led	Status
1	1	24	Jeff Gordon (W)	Hendrick Motorsports	Chevrolet	112	80	Running
2	9	6	Mark Martin (W)	Roush Racing	Ford	112	24	Running
3	31	43	John Andretti	Petty Enterprises	Pontiac	112	0	Running
4	9	2	Rusty Wallace (W)	Penske-Kranefuss Racing	Ford	112	0	Running
5	6	23	Jimmy Spencer	Haas-Carter Motorsports	Ford	112	5	Running
6	29	88	Dale Jarrett	Robert Yates Racing	Ford	112	0	Running
7	34	12	Jeremy Mayfield	Penske-Kranefuss Racing	Ford	112	0	Running
8	13	44	Kyle Petty	Petty Enterprises	Pontiac	112	0	Running
9	23	3	Dale Earnhardt	Richard Childress Racing	Chevrolet	112	0	Running
10	11	7	Michael Waltrip	Mattei Motorsports	Chevrolet	112	0	Running
11	17	4	Bobby Hamilton	Morgan-McClure Motorsports	Chevrolet	112	0	Running
12	10	66	Darrell Waltrip	Haas-Carter Motorsports	Ford	112	0	Running
13	7	94	Bill Elliott	Bill Elliott Racing	Ford	112	0	Running
14	19	55	Kenny Wallace	Andy Petree Racing	Chevrolet	112	0	Running
15	2	20	Tony Stewart (R)	Joe Gibbs Racing	Pontiac	112	0	Running
16	38	97	Chad Little	Roush Racing	Ford	112	0	Running
17	16	31	Mike Skinner	Richard Childress Racing	Chevrolet	112	0	Running
18	32	21	Elliott Sadler (R)	Wood Brothers Racing	Ford	112	0	Running
19	11	42	Joe Nemechek	SABCO Racing	Chevrolet	112	0	Running
20	22	75	Ted Musgrave	Butch Mock Motorsports	Ford	112	0	Running
21	41	45	Rich Bickle	Tyler Jet Motorsports	Pontiac	112	0	Running
22	18	28	Kenny Irwin Jr.	Robert Yates Racing	Ford	112	0	Running
23	24	98	Rick Mast	Cale Yarborough Motorsports	Ford	112	0	Running
24	27	99	Jeff Burton	Roush Racing	Ford	112	3	Running
25	21	40	Sterling Marlin	SABCO Racing	Chevrolet	112	0	Running
26	35	26	Johnny Benson Jr.	Roush Racing	Ford	112	0	Running
27	14	18	Bobby Labonte	Joe Gibbs Racing	Pontiac	112	0	Running
28	33	60	Geoff Bodine (W)	Joe Bessey Motorsports	Chevrolet	112	0	Running
29	25	5	Terry Labonte	Hendrick Motorsports	Chevrolet	111	0	Flagged
30	40	36	Ernie Irvan (W)	MB2 Motorsports	Pontiac	111	0	Flagged
31	28	11	Brett Bodine	Brett Bodine Racing	Ford	111	0	Flagged
32	38	16	Kevin Lepage (R)	Roush Racing	Ford	111	0	Flagged
33	30	19	Tom Hubert	Roehig Motorsports	Pontiac	111	0	Flagged
34	3	9	Jerry Nadeau	Melling Racing	Ford	110	0	Flagged
35	26	22	Ward Burton	Bill Davis Racing	Pontiac	110	0	Flagged
36	43	41	David Green (R)	Larry Hedrick Motorsports	Chevrolet	109	0	Flagged
37	36	30	Derrike Cope	Bahari Racing	Pontiac	110	0	Flagged
38	14	10	Ricky Rudd (W)	Rudd Performance Motorsports	Ford	106	0	Contact T10
39	8	33	Ken Schrader	Andy Petree Racing	Chevrolet	93	0	Contact T1
40	42	77	Robert Pressley	Jasper Motorsports	Ford	93	0	Flagged
41	26	25	Wally Dallenbach Jr.	Hendrick Motorsports	Chevrolet	84	0	Handling
42	39	1	Steve Park (R)	Dale Earnhardt, Inc.	Chevrolet	24	0	Contact T1
43	27	38	Butch Gilliland	Hilton Racing	Ford	3	0	Engine
Failed to Qualify
		71	R. K. Smith	Marcis Auto Racing	Chevrolet			
		89	Austin Cameron (R)	Cameron Racing	Chevrolet			
		58	Sean Woodside	SBIII Motorsports	Ford			
		70	John Metcalf (R)	Metcalf Motorsports	Chevrolet			
		09	Mike Borkowski (R)	Midgley Racing	Pontiac			
		14	Boris Said (R)	Irvan-Simo Racing	Ford			
		61	David Murry (R)	Phoenix Air Racing	Ford			
		96	Steve Portenga (R)	Golden Gate Racing	Pontiac			

Preceded by 1999 Pocono 500	NASCAR Winston Cup Series season 1999	Succeeded by 1999 Pepsi 400
