= 1999 Pennsylvania 500 =

19th race of the 1999 NASCAR Winston Cup Series

Race details
- Race 19 of 34 in the 1999 NASCAR Winston Cup Series
- The 1999 Pennsylvania 500 program cover.
- Date: July 25, 1999
- Official name: 27th Annual Pennsylvania 500
- Location: Long Pond, Pennsylvania, Pocono Raceway
- Course: Permanent racing facility
- Course length: 2.5 miles (4.0 km)
- Distance: 200 laps, 500 mi (804.672 km)
- Average speed: 116.982 miles per hour (188.264 km/h)
- Attendance: 95,000

Pole position
| Driver | Mike Skinner | Richard Childress Racing |
- Time: 52.801

Most laps led
| Driver | Mike Skinner | Richard Childress Racing |
- Laps: 51

Winner
| No. 18 | Bobby Labonte | Joe Gibbs Racing |

Television in the United States
- Network: TBS
- Announcers: Ken Squier, Buddy Baker, Dick Berggren

Radio in the United States
- Radio: Motor Racing Network

The 1999 Pennsylvania 500 was the 19th stock car race of the 1999 NASCAR Winston Cup Series season and the 27th iteration of the event. The race was held on Sunday, July 25, 1999, in front of an audience of 95,000 in Long Pond, Pennsylvania, at Pocono Raceway, a 2.5 miles (4.0 km) triangular permanent course. The race took the scheduled 200 laps to complete. In the final stages of the race, Joe Gibbs Racing driver Bobby Labonte would manage to dominate and pull out to a healthy lead to win his tenth career NASCAR Winston Cup Series victory and his third victory of the season. To fill out the podium, Robert Yates Racing driver Dale Jarrett and Roush Racing driver Mark Martin would finish second and third, respectively.

== Background ==
The layout of Pocono Raceway, the venue where the race was held.

The race was held at Pocono Raceway, which is a three-turn superspeedway located in Long Pond, Pennsylvania. Pocono Raceway is one of a very few NASCAR tracks not owned by either Speedway Motorsports, Inc. or International Speedway Corporation. It is operated by the Igdalsky siblings Brandon, Nicholas, and sister Ashley, and cousins Joseph IV and Chase Mattioli, all of whom are third-generation members of the family-owned Mattco Inc, started by Joseph II and Rose Mattioli.

Outside of the NASCAR races, the track is used throughout the year by Sports Car Club of America (SCCA) and motorcycle clubs as well as racing schools and an IndyCar race. The triangular oval also has three separate infield sections of racetrack – North Course, East Course and South Course. Each of these infield sections use a separate portion of the tri-oval to complete the track. During regular non-race weekends, multiple clubs can use the track by running on different infield sections. Also some of the infield sections can be run in either direction, or multiple infield sections can be put together – such as running the North Course and the South Course and using the tri-oval to connect the two.

=== Entry list ===
- (R) denotes rookie driver.

| # | Driver | Team | Make |
|---|---|---|---|
| 1 | Steve Park | Dale Earnhardt, Inc. | Chevrolet |
| 2 | Rusty Wallace | Penske-Kranefuss Racing | Ford |
| 3 | Dale Earnhardt | Richard Childress Racing | Chevrolet |
| 4 | Bobby Hamilton | Morgan–McClure Motorsports | Chevrolet |
| 5 | Terry Labonte | Hendrick Motorsports | Chevrolet |
| 6 | Mark Martin | Roush Racing | Ford |
| 7 | Michael Waltrip | Mattei Motorsports | Chevrolet |
| 9 | Jerry Nadeau | Melling Racing | Ford |
| 10 | Ricky Rudd | Rudd Performance Motorsports | Ford |
| 11 | Brett Bodine | Brett Bodine Racing | Ford |
| 12 | Jeremy Mayfield | Penske-Kranefuss Racing | Ford |
| 16 | Kevin Lepage | Roush Racing | Ford |
| 18 | Bobby Labonte | Joe Gibbs Racing | Pontiac |
| 20 | Tony Stewart | Joe Gibbs Racing | Pontiac |
| 21 | Elliott Sadler | Wood Brothers Racing | Ford |
| 22 | Ward Burton | Bill Davis Racing | Pontiac |
| 23 | Jimmy Spencer | Haas-Carter Motorsports | Ford |
| 24 | Jeff Gordon | Hendrick Motorsports | Chevrolet |
| 25 | Wally Dallenbach Jr. | Hendrick Motorsports | Chevrolet |
| 26 | Johnny Benson Jr. | Roush Racing | Ford |
| 28 | Kenny Irwin Jr. | Robert Yates Racing | Ford |
| 30 | Derrike Cope | Bahari Racing | Pontiac |
| 31 | Mike Skinner | Richard Childress Racing | Chevrolet |
| 33 | Ken Schrader | Andy Petree Racing | Chevrolet |
| 36 | Ernie Irvan | MB2 Motorsports | Pontiac |
| 40 | Sterling Marlin | Team SABCO | Chevrolet |
| 41 | David Green | Larry Hedrick Motorsports | Chevrolet |
| 42 | Joe Nemechek | Team SABCO | Chevrolet |
| 43 | John Andretti | Petty Enterprises | Pontiac |
| 44 | Kyle Petty | Petty Enterprises | Pontiac |
| 45 | Rich Bickle | Tyler Jet Motorsports | Pontiac |
| 55 | Kenny Wallace | Andy Petree Racing | Chevrolet |
| 58 | Hut Stricklin | SBIII Motorsports | Ford |
| 60 | Geoff Bodine | Joe Bessey Racing | Chevrolet |
| 66 | Darrell Waltrip | Haas-Carter Motorsports | Ford |
| 71 | Dave Marcis | Marcis Auto Racing | Chevrolet |
| 75 | Ted Musgrave | Butch Mock Motorsports | Ford |
| 77 | Robert Pressley | Jasper Motorsports | Ford |
| 88 | Dale Jarrett | Robert Yates Racing | Ford |
| 90 | Stanton Barrett | Donlavey Racing | Ford |
| 91 | Morgan Shepherd | LJ Racing | Chevrolet |
| 94 | Bill Elliott | Bill Elliott Racing | Ford |
| 97 | Chad Little | Roush Racing | Ford |
| 98 | Rick Mast | Cale Yarborough Motorsports | Ford |
| 99 | Jeff Burton | Roush Racing | Ford |
Official entry list

== Practice ==
=== First practice ===
The second practice session was held on Friday, July 23. Sterling Marlin, driving for Team SABCO, would set the fastest time in the session, with a lap of 53.445 and an average speed of 168.397 mph (271.009 km/h).

| Pos. | # | Driver | Team | Make | Time | Speed |
|---|---|---|---|---|---|---|
| 1 | 40 | Sterling Marlin | Team SABCO | Chevrolet | 53.445 | 168.397 |
| 2 | 42 | Joe Nemechek | Team SABCO | Chevrolet | 53.516 | 168.174 |
| 3 | 24 | Jeff Gordon | Hendrick Motorsports | Chevrolet | 53.562 | 168.030 |
Full second practice results

=== Second practice ===
The second practice session was held on Friday, July 23, at 10:35 a.m. EST. The session would last for three hours and 25 minutes. Sterling Marlin, driving for Team SABCO, would set the fastest time in the session, with a lap of 53.007 and an average speed of 169.788 mph (273.247 km/h).

| Pos. | # | Driver | Team | Make | Time | Speed |
|---|---|---|---|---|---|---|
| 1 | 40 | Sterling Marlin | Team SABCO | Chevrolet | 53.007 | 169.788 |
| 2 | 6 | Mark Martin | Roush Racing | Ford | 53.033 | 169.705 |
| 3 | 24 | Jeff Gordon | Hendrick Motorsports | Chevrolet | 53.109 | 169.462 |
Full first practice results

=== Third practice ===
The third practice session was held on Saturday, July 24, at 9:30 a.m. EST. The session would last for one hour and 20 minutes. David Green, driving for Larry Hedrick Motorsports, would set the fastest time in the session, with a lap of 53.806 and an average speed of 167.267 mph (269.190 km/h).

During the session, Wood Brothers Racing driver Elliott Sadler was involved in a wreck that resulted in an injured left foot. Despite fellow Morgan Shepherd being on standby for Sadler, Sadler would start the race.

| Pos. | # | Driver | Team | Make | Time | Speed |
|---|---|---|---|---|---|---|
| 1 | 41 | David Green | Larry Hedrick Motorsports | Chevrolet | 53.806 | 167.267 |
| 2 | 88 | Dale Jarrett | Robert Yates Racing | Ford | 53.824 | 167.211 |
| 3 | 10 | Ricky Rudd | Rudd Performance Motorsports | Ford | 53.862 | 167.093 |
Full second practice results

=== Final practice ===
The final practice session, sometimes referred to as Happy Hour, was held on Saturday, July 24. The session would last for one hour. Ward Burton, driving for Bill Davis Racing, would set the fastest time in the session, with a lap of 54.380 and an average speed of 165.502 mph (266.350 km/h).

| Pos. | # | Driver | Team | Make | Time | Speed |
|---|---|---|---|---|---|---|
| 1 | 22 | Ward Burton | Bill Davis Racing | Pontiac | 54.380 | 165.502 |
| 2 | 6 | Mark Martin | Roush Racing | Ford | 54.399 | 165.444 |
| 3 | 12 | Jeremy Mayfield | Penske-Kranefuss Racing | Ford | 54.434 | 165.337 |
Full Happy Hour practice results

== Qualifying ==
Qualifying was split into two rounds. The first round was held on Friday, July 23, at 3:00 p.m. EST. Each driver would have one lap to set a time. During the first round, the top 25 drivers in the round would be guaranteed a starting spot in the race. If a driver was not able to guarantee a spot in the first round, they had the option to scrub their time from the first round and try and run a faster lap time in a second round qualifying run, held on Saturday, July 24, at 11:30 a.m. EST. As with the first round, each driver would have one lap to set a time. Positions 26-36 would be decided on time, while positions 37-43 would be based on provisionals. Six spots are awarded by the use of provisionals based on owner's points. The seventh is awarded to a past champion who has not otherwise qualified for the race. If no past champion needs the provisional, the next team in the owner points will be awarded a provisional.

Mike Skinner, driving for Richard Childress Racing, would win the pole, setting a time of 52.801 and an average speed of 170.451 miles per hour (274.314 km/h).

Two drivers would fail to qualify: Derrike Cope and Morgan Shepherd.

=== Full qualifying results ===
| Pos. | # | Driver | Team | Make | Time | Speed |
|---|---|---|---|---|---|---|
| 1 | 31 | Mike Skinner | Richard Childress Racing | Chevrolet | 52.801 | 170.451 |
| 2 | 6 | Mark Martin | Roush Racing | Ford | 52.917 | 170.078 |
| 3 | 33 | Ken Schrader | Andy Petree Racing | Chevrolet | 52.962 | 169.933 |
| 4 | 18 | Bobby Labonte | Joe Gibbs Racing | Pontiac | 52.995 | 169.827 |
| 5 | 43 | John Andretti | Petty Enterprises | Pontiac | 53.008 | 169.786 |
| 6 | 25 | Wally Dallenbach Jr. | Hendrick Motorsports | Chevrolet | 53.089 | 169.527 |
| 7 | 24 | Jeff Gordon | Hendrick Motorsports | Chevrolet | 53.092 | 169.517 |
| 8 | 22 | Ward Burton | Bill Davis Racing | Pontiac | 53.112 | 169.453 |
| 9 | 40 | Sterling Marlin | Team SABCO | Chevrolet | 53.115 | 169.444 |
| 10 | 42 | Joe Nemechek | Team SABCO | Chevrolet | 53.129 | 169.399 |
| 11 | 3 | Dale Earnhardt | Richard Childress Racing | Chevrolet | 53.222 | 169.103 |
| 12 | 20 | Tony Stewart (R) | Joe Gibbs Racing | Pontiac | 53.231 | 169.074 |
| 13 | 45 | Rich Bickle | Tyler Jet Motorsports | Pontiac | 53.236 | 169.059 |
| 14 | 5 | Terry Labonte | Hendrick Motorsports | Chevrolet | 53.283 | 168.909 |
| 15 | 88 | Dale Jarrett | Robert Yates Racing | Ford | 53.296 | 168.868 |
| 16 | 7 | Michael Waltrip | Mattei Motorsports | Chevrolet | 53.320 | 168.792 |
| 17 | 2 | Rusty Wallace | Penske-Kranefuss Racing | Ford | 53.321 | 168.789 |
| 18 | 99 | Jeff Burton | Roush Racing | Ford | 53.330 | 168.761 |
| 19 | 28 | Kenny Irwin Jr. | Robert Yates Racing | Ford | 53.376 | 168.615 |
| 20 | 12 | Jeremy Mayfield | Penske-Kranefuss Racing | Ford | 53.389 | 168.574 |
| 21 | 23 | Jimmy Spencer | Haas-Carter Motorsports | Ford | 53.447 | 168.391 |
| 22 | 98 | Rick Mast | Cale Yarborough Motorsports | Ford | 53.447 | 168.391 |
| 23 | 75 | Ted Musgrave | Butch Mock Motorsports | Ford | 53.472 | 168.312 |
| 24 | 36 | Ernie Irvan | MB2 Motorsports | Pontiac | 53.625 | 167.832 |
| 25 | 71 | Dave Marcis | Marcis Auto Racing | Chevrolet | 53.636 | 167.798 |
| 26 | 11 | Brett Bodine | Brett Bodine Racing | Ford | 53.650 | 167.754 |
| 27 | 4 | Bobby Hamilton | Morgan–McClure Motorsports | Chevrolet | 53.663 | 167.713 |
| 28 | 55 | Kenny Wallace | Andy Petree Racing | Chevrolet | 53.687 | 167.638 |
| 29 | 58 | Hut Stricklin | SBIII Motorsports | Ford | 53.707 | 167.576 |
| 30 | 90 | Stanton Barrett | Donlavey Racing | Ford | 53.721 | 167.532 |
| 31 | 16 | Kevin Lepage | Roush Racing | Ford | 53.728 | 167.510 |
| 32 | 1 | Steve Park | Dale Earnhardt, Inc. | Chevrolet | 53.732 | 167.498 |
| 33 | 77 | Robert Pressley | Jasper Motorsports | Ford | 53.736 | 167.485 |
| 34 | 26 | Johnny Benson Jr. | Roush Racing | Ford | 53.740 | 167.473 |
| 35 | 10 | Ricky Rudd | Rudd Performance Motorsports | Ford | 53.749 | 167.445 |
| 36 | 41 | David Green | Larry Hedrick Motorsports | Chevrolet | 53.778 | 167.355 |
Provisionals
| 37 | 94 | Bill Elliott | Bill Elliott Racing | Ford | -* | -* |
| 38 | 97 | Chad Little | Roush Racing | Ford | -* | -* |
| 39 | 44 | Kyle Petty | Petty Enterprises | Pontiac | -* | -* |
| 40 | 21 | Elliott Sadler (R) | Wood Brothers Racing | Ford | -* | -* |
| 41 | 9 | Jerry Nadeau | Melling Racing | Ford | -* | -* |
| 42 | 60 | Geoff Bodine | Joe Bessey Racing | Chevrolet | -* | -* |
Champion's Provisional
| 43 | 66 | Darrell Waltrip | Haas-Carter Motorsports | Ford | -* | -* |
Failed to qualify
| 44 | 30 | Derrike Cope | Bahari Racing | Pontiac | 53.925 | 166.898 |
| 45 | 91 | Morgan Shepherd | LJ Racing | Chevrolet | 53.951 | 166.818 |
Official first round qualifying results
Official starting lineup

*Time not available.

== Race results ==
| Fin | St | # | Driver | Team | Make | Laps | Led | Status | Pts | Winnings |
|---|---|---|---|---|---|---|---|---|---|---|
| 1 | 4 | 18 | Bobby Labonte | Joe Gibbs Racing | Pontiac | 200 | 38 | running | 180 | $139,385 |
| 2 | 15 | 88 | Dale Jarrett | Robert Yates Racing | Ford | 200 | 41 | running | 175 | $95,695 |
| 3 | 2 | 6 | Mark Martin | Roush Racing | Ford | 200 | 3 | running | 170 | $82,320 |
| 4 | 12 | 20 | Tony Stewart (R) | Joe Gibbs Racing | Pontiac | 200 | 0 | running | 160 | $70,970 |
| 5 | 6 | 25 | Wally Dallenbach Jr. | Hendrick Motorsports | Chevrolet | 200 | 0 | running | 155 | $59,855 |
| 6 | 14 | 5 | Terry Labonte | Hendrick Motorsports | Chevrolet | 200 | 0 | running | 150 | $56,115 |
| 7 | 13 | 45 | Rich Bickle | Tyler Jet Motorsports | Pontiac | 200 | 0 | running | 146 | $45,815 |
| 8 | 32 | 1 | Steve Park | Dale Earnhardt, Inc. | Chevrolet | 200 | 6 | running | 147 | $46,765 |
| 9 | 11 | 3 | Dale Earnhardt | Richard Childress Racing | Chevrolet | 200 | 4 | running | 143 | $48,765 |
| 10 | 1 | 31 | Mike Skinner | Richard Childress Racing | Chevrolet | 200 | 51 | running | 144 | $70,330 |
| 11 | 24 | 36 | Ernie Irvan | MB2 Motorsports | Pontiac | 200 | 0 | running | 130 | $47,215 |
| 12 | 16 | 7 | Michael Waltrip | Mattei Motorsports | Chevrolet | 200 | 0 | running | 127 | $46,665 |
| 13 | 42 | 60 | Geoff Bodine | Joe Bessey Racing | Chevrolet | 200 | 5 | running | 129 | $38,365 |
| 14 | 34 | 26 | Johnny Benson Jr. | Roush Racing | Ford | 200 | 0 | running | 121 | $41,265 |
| 15 | 29 | 58 | Hut Stricklin | SBIII Motorsports | Ford | 200 | 0 | running | 118 | $32,680 |
| 16 | 39 | 44 | Kyle Petty | Petty Enterprises | Pontiac | 200 | 0 | running | 115 | $32,940 |
| 17 | 27 | 4 | Bobby Hamilton | Morgan–McClure Motorsports | Chevrolet | 200 | 0 | running | 112 | $44,340 |
| 18 | 17 | 2 | Rusty Wallace | Penske-Kranefuss Racing | Ford | 199 | 0 | running | 109 | $44,840 |
| 19 | 22 | 98 | Rick Mast | Cale Yarborough Motorsports | Ford | 199 | 5 | running | 111 | $32,190 |
| 20 | 21 | 23 | Jimmy Spencer | Haas-Carter Motorsports | Ford | 199 | 0 | running | 103 | $42,030 |
| 21 | 40 | 21 | Elliott Sadler (R) | Wood Brothers Racing | Ford | 199 | 0 | running | 100 | $39,440 |
| 22 | 38 | 97 | Chad Little | Roush Racing | Ford | 199 | 0 | running | 97 | $38,240 |
| 23 | 33 | 77 | Robert Pressley | Jasper Motorsports | Ford | 199 | 1 | running | 99 | $30,915 |
| 24 | 31 | 16 | Kevin Lepage | Roush Racing | Ford | 199 | 3 | running | 96 | $38,090 |
| 25 | 43 | 66 | Darrell Waltrip | Haas-Carter Motorsports | Ford | 199 | 0 | running | 88 | $30,365 |
| 26 | 26 | 11 | Brett Bodine | Brett Bodine Racing | Ford | 199 | 0 | running | 85 | $37,915 |
| 27 | 35 | 10 | Ricky Rudd | Rudd Performance Motorsports | Ford | 199 | 0 | running | 82 | $36,565 |
| 28 | 9 | 40 | Sterling Marlin | Team SABCO | Chevrolet | 198 | 5 | running | 84 | $33,915 |
| 29 | 10 | 42 | Joe Nemechek | Team SABCO | Chevrolet | 198 | 0 | running | 76 | $33,740 |
| 30 | 25 | 71 | Dave Marcis | Marcis Auto Racing | Chevrolet | 197 | 1 | running | 78 | $27,415 |
| 31 | 30 | 90 | Stanton Barrett | Donlavey Racing | Ford | 195 | 0 | engine | 70 | $26,940 |
| 32 | 7 | 24 | Jeff Gordon | Hendrick Motorsports | Chevrolet | 186 | 22 | suspension | 72 | $49,990 |
| 33 | 23 | 75 | Ted Musgrave | Butch Mock Motorsports | Ford | 183 | 0 | running | 64 | $26,390 |
| 34 | 3 | 33 | Ken Schrader | Andy Petree Racing | Chevrolet | 183 | 0 | running | 61 | $32,865 |
| 35 | 20 | 12 | Jeremy Mayfield | Penske-Kranefuss Racing | Ford | 177 | 0 | running | 58 | $40,265 |
| 36 | 18 | 99 | Jeff Burton | Roush Racing | Ford | 175 | 1 | transmission | 60 | $41,740 |
| 37 | 28 | 55 | Kenny Wallace | Andy Petree Racing | Chevrolet | 171 | 0 | crash | 52 | $29,250 |
| 38 | 41 | 9 | Jerry Nadeau | Melling Racing | Ford | 167 | 0 | crash | 49 | $25,500 |
| 39 | 37 | 94 | Bill Elliott | Bill Elliott Racing | Ford | 158 | 0 | crash | 46 | $31,950 |
| 40 | 8 | 22 | Ward Burton | Bill Davis Racing | Pontiac | 155 | 14 | running | 48 | $35,500 |
| 41 | 36 | 41 | David Green | Larry Hedrick Motorsports | Chevrolet | 124 | 0 | engine | 40 | $24,850 |
| 42 | 5 | 43 | John Andretti | Petty Enterprises | Pontiac | 45 | 0 | crash | 37 | $39,800 |
| 43 | 19 | 28 | Kenny Irwin Jr. | Robert Yates Racing | Ford | 14 | 0 | crash | 34 | $31,950 |
Failed to qualify
| 44 | | 30 | Derrike Cope | Bahari Racing | Pontiac | | | | | |
| 45 | | 91 | Morgan Shepherd | LJ Racing | Chevrolet | | | | | |
Official race results

| Previous race: 1999 Jiffy Lube 300 | NASCAR Winston Cup Series; 1999 season | Next race: 1999 Brickyard 400 |
