= 1999 Jiffy Lube 300 =

Race details
- Race 18 of 34 in the 1999 NASCAR Winston Cup Series
- 1999 Jiffy Lube 300 program cover, costing $10 (USD)
- Date: July 11, 1999
- Official name: Jiffy Lube 300
- Location: New Hampshire International Speedway, Loudon, New Hampshire
- Course: Permanent racing facility
- Course length: 1.058 miles (1.702 km)
- Distance: 300 laps, 317.4 mi (510.8 km)
- Average speed: 101.876 miles per hour (163.954 km/h)

Pole position
Driver	Jeff Gordon	Hendrick Motorsports

Most laps led
Driver	Tony Stewart	Joe Gibbs Racing
- Laps: 118

Winner
No. 99	Jeff Burton	Roush Racing

Television in the United States
- Network: TNN
- Announcers: Eli Gold, Buddy Baker, and Dick Berggren

The 1999 Jiffy Lube 300 was a NASCAR Winston Cup Series race that took place on July 11, 1999, at the New Hampshire International Speedway in Loudon, New Hampshire. This race was the 18th stop of the 1999 NASCAR Winston Cup Series tour.

== Background ==
The New Hampshire International Speedway is a 1.058-mile flat oval built in 1989 on the remnants of Bryar Motorsports Park in Loudon, New Hampshire. The track features 12 degree banking in the corners and 2 degrees on the straights. The straights are 1,500 feet long.

== Entry list ==
Car	Driver	Team	Manufacturer	Sponsor
1	Steve Park	Dale Earnhardt, Inc.	Chevrolet	Pennzoil
2	Rusty Wallace	Penske-Kranefuss Racing	Ford	Miller Lite
3	Dale Earnhardt Sr.	Richard Childress Racing	Chevrolet	GM Goodwrench Service Plus
4	Bobby Hamilton	Morgan-McClure Motorsports	Chevrolet	Kodak
5	Terry Labonte	Hendrick Motorsports	Chevrolet	Kellogg's
6	Mark Martin	Roush Racing	Ford	Valvoline, Cummins
7	Michael Waltrip	Mattei Motorsports	Chevrolet	Philips Electronics
8	Dale Earnhardt Jr.	Dale Earnhardt, Inc.	Chevrolet	Budweiser
9	Jerry Nadeau	Melling Racing	Ford	Cartoon Network, Radio Shack
10	Ricky Rudd	Rudd Performance Motorsports	Ford	Tide
11	Brett Bodine	Brett Bodine Racing	Ford	Paychex
12	Jeremy Mayfield	Penske-Kranefuss Racing	Ford	Mobil 1
16	Kevin Lepage	Roush Racing	Ford	TV Guide
18	Bobby Labonte	Joe Gibbs Racing	Pontiac	Interstate Batteries
20	Tony Stewart	Joe Gibbs Racing	Toyota	Home Depot
21	Elliott Sadler	Wood Brothers Racing	Ford	Citgo
22	Ward Burton	Bill Davis Racing	Pontiac	Caterpillar
23	Jimmy Spencer	Travis Carter Enterprises	Ford	Team Winston, No Bull
24	Jeff Gordon	Hendrick Motorsports	Chevrolet	DuPont Automotive Finishes
25	Wally Dallenbach Jr.	Hendrick Motorsports	Chevrolet	Budweiser
26	Johnny Benson Jr.	Roush Racing	Ford	Cheerios
28	Kenny Irwin Jr.	Robert Yates Racing	Ford	Texaco, Havoline
30	Derrike Cope	Bahari Racing	Pontiac	Jimmy Dean
31	Mike Skinner	Richard Childress Racing	Chevrolet	Lowe's
33	Ken Schrader	Andy Petree Racing	Chevrolet	Skoal
36	Ernie Irvan	MB2 Motorsports	Pontiac	M&M's
40	Sterling Marlin	SABCO Racing	Chevrolet	Coors Light
41	David Green	Larry Hedrick Motorsports	Chevrolet	Kodiak
42	Joe Nemechek	SABCO Racing	Chevrolet	BellSouth
43	John Andretti	Petty Enterprises	Pontiac	STP
44	Kyle Petty	Petty Enterprises	Pontiac	Hot Wheels
45	Rich Bickle	Tyler Jet Motorsports	Pontiac	10-10-345
50	Ricky Craven	Midwest Transit Racing	Chevrolet	Midwest Transit
55	Kenny Wallace	Andy Petree Racing	Chevrolet	Square D
58	Hut Stricklin	SBIII Motorsports	Ford	Turbine Solutions
60	Geoff Bodine	Joe Bessey Motorsports	Chevrolet	Power Team
66	Darrell Waltrip	Haas-Carter Motorsports	Ford	Big Kmart, Route 66
71	Dave Marcis	Marcis Auto Racing	Chevrolet	RealTree Camouflage
75	Ted Musgrave	Butch Mock Motorsports	Ford	Remington Arms
77	Robert Pressley	Jasper Motorsports	Ford	Jasper Engines & Transmissions
88	Dale Jarrett	Robert Yates Racing	Ford	Quality Care, Ford Credit
91	Dick Trickle	LJ Racing	Chevrolet	Kodiak, Little Joe's Autos
93	Dave Blaney	Bill Davis Racing	Pontiac	Amoco
94	Bill Elliott	Bill Elliott Racing	Ford	McDonald's
97	Chad Little	Roush Racing	Ford	John Deere
98	Rick Mast	Cale Yarborough Motorsports	Ford	Universal Studios
99	Jeff Burton	Roush Racing	Ford	Exide Batteries

== Qualifying ==
Jeff Gordon set a new track record at 131.171 mph in qualifying. Dale Earnhardt, Jr. made his second Winston Cup Series start in this race.

Pos.	Car.	Driver	Manufacturer	Time	Avg. Speed (mph)
1	24	Jeff Gordon	Chevrolet	29.037	131.171
2	2	Rusty Wallace	Ford	29.126	130.770
3	18	Bobby Labonte	Pontiac	29.138	130.716
4	33	Ken Schrader	Chevrolet	29.138	130.716
5	44	Kyle Petty	Pontiac	29.152	130.653
6	55	Kenny Wallace	Chevrolet	29.201	130.434
7	43	John Andretti	Pontiac	29.217	130.362
8	7	Michael Waltrip	Chevrolet	29.233	130.291
9	88	Dale Jarrett	Ford	29.268	130.135
10	20	Tony Stewart	Pontiac	29.288	130.046
11	1	Steve Park	Chevrolet	29.291	130.033
12	50	Ricky Craven	Chevrolet	29.359	129.732
13	8	Dale Earnhardt, Jr.	Chevrolet	29.364	129.710
14	3	Dale Earnhardt	Chevrolet	29.371	129.679
15	9	Jerry Nadeau	Ford	29.381	129.635
16	40	Sterling Marlin	Chevrolet	29.403	129.538
17	42	Joe Nemechek	Chevrolet	29.403	129.538
18	5	Terry Labonte	Chevrolet	29.444	129.357
19	31	Mike Skinner	Chevrolet	29.462	129.278
20	36	Ernie Irvan	Pontiac	29.499	129.116
21	25	Wally Dallenbach, Jr.	Chevrolet	29.504	129.094
22	22	Ward Burton	Pontiac	29.522	129.016
23	28	Kenny Irwin, Jr.	Ford	29.538	128.946
24	66	Darrell Waltrip	Ford	29.550	128.893
25	98	Rick Mast	Ford	29.554	128.876
26	10	Ricky Rudd	Ford	29.574	128.789
27	26	Johnny Benson, Jr.	Ford	29.595	128.697
28	45	Rich Bickle	Pontiac	29.599	128.680
29	23	Jimmy Spencer	Ford	29.600	128.676
30	91	Dick Trickle	Chevrolet	29.613	128.619
31	12	Jeremy Mayfield	Ford	29.618	128.597
32	58	Hut Stricklin	Ford	29.652	128.450
33	21	Elliott Sadler	Ford	29.661	128.411
34	93	Dave Blaney	Pontiac	29.661	128.411
35	60	Geoffrey Bodine	Chevrolet	29.681	128.325
36	11	Brett Bodine	Ford	29.692	128.277
Provisionals
37	6	Mark Martin	Ford	0.000	0.000
38	99	Jeff Burton	Ford	0.000	0.000
39	4	Bobby Hamilton	Chevrolet	0.000	0.000
40	94	Bill Elliott	Ford	0.000	0.000
41	97	Chad Little	Ford	0.000	0.000
42	16	Kevin Lepage	Ford	0.000	0.000
43	75	Ted Musgrave	Ford	0.000	0.000
Failed to qualify
44	77	Robert Pressley	Ford	29.939	127.219
45	30	Derrike Cope	Pontiac	30.079	126.627
46	41	David Green	Chevrolet	30.298	125.711
47	71	Dave Marcis	Chevrolet	30.633	124.336

Failed to qualify: Robert Pressley (#77), Derrike Cope (#30), David Green (#41), Dave Marcis (#71)

== Race recap ==
The race went green with Jeff Gordon on the pole and led the first 19 laps. Dale Earnhardt, Jr.'s second Cup race ended very early as ignition problems sidelined him to 43rd place. The race featured 7 caution flags for 49 laps.

The final 91 laps finished under green. This set up a long fuel-mileage run to the finish. Some drivers were able to stretch their fuel while others could not. Tony Stewart was on his way to win his first ever Winston Cup race, leading a total of 118 laps. However, with 3 laps to go, he ran out of fuel on the backstretch. He fell back to 10th and would have to wait another day to win his first Cup race. Jeff Burton, who started 38th, led the final 3 laps to win the race. Kenny Wallace finished a career-best 2nd. Bill Elliott finished 5th, his only top 5 in what would be a dismal 1999 campaign for Elliott.

On the last lap, Jeff Gordon used a bump-and-run on Dale Jarrett, taking the fourth spot. After the race, Jarrett was very upset at Gordon and led to a verbal confrontation in the garage.

== Race results ==
Fin	St	#	Driver	Make	Team	Sponsor	Laps	Led	Status	Pts	Winnings
1	38	99	Jeff Burton	Ford	Roush Racing	Exide Batteries	300	2	running	180	139490
2	6	55	Kenny Wallace	Chevrolet	Andy Petree Racing	Square D	300	0	running	170	95400
3	1	24	Jeff Gordon	Chevrolet	Hendrick Motorsports	DuPont Automotive Finishes	300	54	running	170	97050
4	9	88	Dale Jarrett	Ford	Robert Yates Racing	Quality Care, Ford Credit	300	18	running	165	75550
5	40	94	Bill Elliott	Ford	Bill Elliott Racing	McDonald's	300	0	running	155	63815
6	37	6	Mark Martin	Ford	Roush Racing	Valvoline, Cummins	300	0	running	150	68400
7	21	25	Wally Dallenbach, Jr.	Chevrolet	Hendrick Motorsports	Budweiser	300	0	running	146	54875
8	14	3	Dale Earnhardt	Chevrolet	Richard Childress Racing	GM Goodwrench Service Plus	300	0	running	142	56675
9	29	23	Jimmy Spencer	Ford	Travis Carter Enterprises	Team Winston, No Bull	300	0	running	138	57275
10	10	20	Tony Stewart	Pontiac	Joe Gibbs Racing	Home Depot	300	118	running	144	55715
11	18	5	Terry Labonte	Chevrolet	Hendrick Motorsports	Kellogg's	300	0	running	130	56175
12	11	1	Steve Park	Chevrolet	Dale Earnhardt, Inc.	Pennzoil	300	0	running	127	51775
13	12	50	Ricky Craven	Chevrolet	Midwest Transit Racing	Midwest Transit	300	0	running	124	40375
14	28	45	Rich Bickle	Pontiac	Tyler Jet Motorsports	10-10-345	300	0	running	121	44275
15	22	22	Ward Burton	Pontiac	Bill Davis Racing	Caterpillar	300	0	running	118	52815
16	39	4	Bobby Hamilton	Chevrolet	Morgan-McClure Motorsports	Kodak	300	0	running	115	55875
17	27	26	Johnny Benson, Jr.	Ford	Roush Racing	Cheerios	300	0	running	112	50850
18	7	43	John Andretti	Pontiac	Petty Enterprises	STP	299	60	running	114	66900
19	8	7	Michael Waltrip	Chevrolet	Mattei Motorsports	Philips Electronics	299	0	running	106	49950
20	33	21	Elliott Sadler	Ford	Wood Brothers Racing	Citgo	299	0	running	103	53465
21	20	36	Ernie Irvan	Pontiac	MB2 Motorsports	M&M's	299	0	running	100	49425
22	42	16	Kevin Lepage	Ford	Roush Racing	TV Guide	299	0	running	97	49575
23	19	31	Mike Skinner	Chevrolet	Richard Childress Racing	Lowe's	299	0	running	94	48925
24	41	97	Chad Little	Ford	Roush Racing	John Deere	298	0	running	91	48675
25	43	75	Ted Musgrave	Ford	Butch Mock Motorsports	Remington Arms	298	0	running	88	41725
26	23	28	Kenny Irwin, Jr.	Ford	Robert Yates Racing	Texaco, Havoline	298	0	running	85	48475
27	26	10	Ricky Rudd	Ford	Rudd Performance Motorsports	Tide	298	0	running	82	48000
28	31	12	Jeremy Mayfield	Ford	Penske-Kranefuss Racing	Mobil 1	297	0	running	79	52850
29	30	91	Dick Trickle	Chevrolet	LJ Racing	Kodiak, Little Joe's Autos	297	0	running	76	37700
30	25	98	Rick Mast	Ford	Cale Yarborough Motorsports	Universal Studios	297	0	running	73	40300
31	36	11	Brett Bodine	Ford	Brett Bodine Racing	Paychex	297	0	running	70	44450
32	35	60	Geoffrey Bodine	Chevrolet	Joe Bessey Motorsports	Power Team	295	0	running	67	37325
33	24	66	Darrell Waltrip	Ford	Haas-Carter Motorsports	Big Kmart, Route 66	295	0	running	64	37200
34	16	40	Sterling Marlin	Chevrolet	SABCO Racing	Coors Light	293	0	running	61	44075
35	4	33	Ken Schrader	Chevrolet	Andy Petree Racing	Skoal	288	0	running	58	43950
36	15	9	Jerry Nadeau	Ford	Melling Racing	Cartoon Network, Radio Shack	285	0	running	55	37325
37	17	42	Joe Nemechek	Chevrolet	SABCO Racing	BellSouth	260	0	running	52	43700
38	3	18	Bobby Labonte	Pontiac	Joe Gibbs Racing	Interstate Batteries	222	48	running	54	58300
39	32	58	Hut Stricklin	Ford	SBIII Motorsports	Turbine Solutions	193	0	engine	46	36575
40	34	93	Dave Blaney	Pontiac	Bill Davis Racing	Amoco	193	0	crash	43	36550
41	5	44	Kyle Petty	Pontiac	Petty Enterprises	Hot Wheels	190	0	rear end	40	36525
42	2	2	Rusty Wallace	Ford	Penske-Kranefuss Racing	Miller Lite	144	0	crash	37	55000
43	13	8	Dale Earnhardt, Jr.	Chevrolet	Dale Earnhardt, Inc.	Budweiser	44	0	ignition	34	36475
Failed to qualify
44		77	Robert Pressley	Ford	Jasper Motorsports	Jasper Engines & Transmissions					
45		30	Derrike Cope	Pontiac	Bahari Racing	Jimmy Dean					
46		41	David Green	Chevrolet	Larry Hedrick Motorsports	Kodiak					
47		71	Dave Marcis	Chevrolet	Marcis Auto Racing	RealTree Camouflage					

== Timeline ==
- Start: Jeff Gordon leads the first 19 laps from the pole.
- Lap 45: Dale Earnhardt, Jr. goes behind the wall with ignition problems.
- Lap 79: Joe Nemechek crashes in the frontstretch, bringing out the first caution of the day.
- Lap 99: Jerry Nadeau spins in turns 1 and 2, bringing out the second caution.
- Lap 115: Mark Martin, Kenny Irwin, and Steve Park got into an accident on the backstretch, bringing out the third caution.
- Lap 122: Ken Schrader, Johnny Benson, and Geoffrey Bodine crashed in the backstretch, bringing out the fourth caution. Much oil was dropped on the racetrack which extended the caution for 14 laps.
- Lap 136: John Andretti took the lead for the first time and would lead for 60 laps.
- Lap 141: Jeff Gordon made contact with Rusty Wallace, sending the Miller Lite/Harley-Davidson Ford into the turn 3 wall, bringing out the fifth caution.
- Lap 195: Dave Blaney crashes in turn 4, bringing out the sixth caution.
- Lap 204: Bobby Labonte, one of the leaders for most of the race, got loose underneath the lapped car of Chad Little, spun out and hit the wall. Dale Earnhardt, who was running fifth, also spun out trying to avoid Labonte. This would be the seventh and final caution of the race.
- Lap 297 Tony Stewart ran out of the fuel with 3 laps to go. Jeff Burton would go by Stewart to take the lead.
- Lap 300: Jeff Burton takes the checkered flag.

== Post-race championship standings ==
Pos	Driver	Points	Differential
1	Dale Jarrett	2839	--
2	Jeff Burton	2599	-240
3	Mark Martin	2590	-249
4	Bobby Labonte	2551	-288
5	Jeff Gordon	2450	-389
6	Tony Stewart	2405	-434
7	Dale Earnhardt	2324	-515
8	Ward Burton	2141	-698
9	Terry Labonte	2098	-741
10	Jeremy Mayfield	2097	-742

Preceded by 1999 Pepsi 400	NASCAR Winston Cup Series; 1999	Succeeded by 1999 Pennsylvania 500
