= Mike Ciochetti =

American stock car racing driver

- Born: April 23, 1959 (age 67) Clayton, Georgia, U.S.

ARCA Re/Max Series
- Years active: 1996–1999, 2007
- Starts: 42
- Wins: 0
- Poles: 1
- Best finish: 3rd twice in 1998

Michael Ciochetti Jr. (born April 23, 1959) is an American stock car racing driver and aviation entrepreneur. He is a former competitor in the ARCA Racing Series, and planned to compete in the NASCAR Winston Cup Series before suffering a career-ending injury.

== Racing career ==
Ciochetti began his racing career in South Florida in the mid-1970s racing at both Hialeah Speedway and the South Florida Fairgrounds Speedway in West Palm Beach. In the early 1980s, he competed on the NASCAR All Pro Series traveling circuit throughout the Southeastern U.S. In 1992, he worked as a mechanic on Alan Kulwicki's 1992 Winston Cup Championship-winning team. Following Kulwicki's death in a 1993 plane crash, Ciochetti transitioned to Precision Products Racing and driver Rick Mast where he worked for the 1994 season before resuming his own career as a driver on the ARCA Racing Series.

Between 1996 and 1999, Ciochetti competed in 41 ARCA Racing Series races, posting a best finish of third twice in 1998, at Charlotte Motor Speedway and Texas Motor Speedway. In 1998, he attempted to make his debut in the NASCAR Winston Cup Series, driving the No. 80 Hover Motorsports Ford in qualifying for the 1998 Daytona 500, but he failed to make the race due to an accident on the final lap of the Twin 125-mile qualifying race. He won one pole in the ARCA series, at Pocono Raceway in 1998. Towards the end of the 1999 season, Ciochetti signed a deal to drive for Cale Yarborough Motorsports and run for NASCAR Winston Cup Rookie of the Year in the 2000 season; planning to run the No. 39, the team planned to make its debut in the season-ending race of the 1999 NASCAR Winston Cup Series season at Homestead-Miami Speedway. However shortly after the announcement, Ciochetti's shoulder was broken in an ARCA crash at Talladega Superspeedway; the injury forced him to undergo multiple surgeries, and sidelined his racing career. Ciochetti would return for one final ARCA race, at Talladega in 2007 driving for K-Automotive Motorsports, where he was very competitive, running as high as sixth, but finished 39th after blowing a tire in the late laps of the race.

Ciochetti is now the developer of a "Fly-In Community" named Heaven's Landing which is located just outside of Clayton, Georgia. He is an avid pilot with a continued interest in NASCAR.

== Aviation career ==
A long-time flyer, following his injury, Ciochetti developed property he owned in northern Georgia as Heaven's Landing, a fly-in community. Ciochetti is also active with the Liberty Foundation, maintaining the Boeing B-17 Flying Fortress bomber Liberty Belle.

== Motorsports career results ==
=== NASCAR ===
(key) (Bold - Pole position awarded by qualifying time. Italics - Pole position earned by points standings or practice time. * – Most laps led.)

==== Winston Cup Series ====
NASCAR Winston Cup Series results
Year	Team	No.	Make	1	2	3	4	5	6	7	8	9	10	11	12	13	14	15	16	17	18	19	20	21	22	23	24	25	26	27	28	29	30	31	32	33	NWCC	Pts	Ref
1998	Hover Motorsports	80	Ford	DAY; DNQ	CAR	LVS	ATL	DAR	BRI	TEX	MAR	TAL	CAL	CLT	DOV	RCH	MCH	POC	SON	NHA	POC	IND	GLN	MCH	BRI	NHA	DAR	RCH	DOV	MAR	CLT	TAL	DAY	PHO	CAR	ATL	NA	0	

===== Daytona 500 =====
Year	Team	Manufacturer	Start	Finish
1998	Hover Motorsports	Ford	DNQ	
