= 1998 Primestar 500 =

Fourth race of the 1998 NASCAR Winston Cup Series

Race details
- Race 4 of 33 in the 1998 NASCAR Winston Cup Series
- The 1998 Primestar 500 program cover, featuring Ted Musgrave. Artwork by NASCAR artist Sam Bass.
- Date: March 9, 1998
- Official name: 39th Annual Primestar 500
- Location: Hampton, Georgia, Atlanta Motor Speedway
- Course: Permanent racing facility
- Course length: 1.54 miles (2.48 km)
- Distance: 325 laps, 500.5 mi (805.476 km)
- Average speed: 139.501 miles per hour (224.505 km/h)

Pole position
Driver	John Andretti	Petty Enterprises
- Time: 28.732

Most laps led
Driver	Kenny Irwin Jr.	Robert Yates Racing
- Laps: 113

Winner
No. 18	Bobby Labonte	Joe Gibbs Racing

Television in the United States
- Network: ESPN
- Announcers: Bob Jenkins, Ned Jarrett, Benny Parsons

Radio in the United States
- Radio: Performance Racing Network

The 1998 Primestar 500 was the fourth stock car race of the 1998 NASCAR Winston Cup Series season and the 39th iteration of the event. The race was originally scheduled to be held on Sunday, March 8, 1998, but was postponed to Monday, March 9 due to rain. The race was held in Hampton, Georgia at Atlanta Motor Speedway, a 1.54 miles (2.48 km) permanent asphalt quad-oval intermediate speedway. The race took the scheduled 325 laps to complete. In the late stages of the race, Joe Gibbs Racing driver Bobby Labonte would manage to pass for the lead with 47 to go and take his sixth career NASCAR Winston Cup Series victory and his first victory of the season. To fill out the podium, Robert Yates Racing driver Dale Jarrett and Penske-Kranefuss Racing driver Jeremy Mayfield would finish second and third, respectively.

== Background ==
The layout of Atlanta Motor Speedway, the circuit where the race was held.

Atlanta Motor Speedway (formerly Atlanta International Raceway) is a 1.54-mile race track in Hampton, Georgia, United States, 20 miles (32 km) south of Atlanta. It has annually hosted NASCAR Winston Cup Series stock car races since its inauguration in 1960.

The venue was bought by Speedway Motorsports in 1990. In 1994, 46 condominiums were built over the northeastern side of the track. In 1997, to standardize the track with Speedway Motorsports' other two intermediate ovals, the entire track was almost completely rebuilt. The frontstretch and backstretch were swapped, and the configuration of the track was changed from oval to quad-oval, with a new official length of 1.54-mile (2.48 km) where before it was 1.522-mile (2.449 km). The project made the track one of the fastest on the NASCAR circuit.

=== Entry list ===
- (R) - denotes rookie driver.

#	Driver	Team	Make
1	Steve Park* (R)	Dale Earnhardt, Inc.	Chevrolet
2	Rusty Wallace	Penske-Kranefuss Racing	Ford
3	Dale Earnhardt	Richard Childress Racing	Chevrolet
4	Bobby Hamilton	Morgan–McClure Motorsports	Chevrolet
5	Terry Labonte	Hendrick Motorsports	Chevrolet
05	Morgan Shepherd	Shepherd Racing Ventures	Pontiac
6	Mark Martin	Roush Racing	Ford
7	Geoff Bodine	Mattei Motorsports	Ford
8	Hut Stricklin	Stavola Brothers Racing	Chevrolet
9	Lake Speed	Melling Racing	Ford
10	Ricky Rudd	Rudd Performance Motorsports	Ford
11	Brett Bodine	Brett Bodine Racing	Ford
12	Jeremy Mayfield	Penske-Kranefuss Racing	Ford
13	Jerry Nadeau (R)	Elliott-Marino Racing	Ford
16	Ted Musgrave	Roush Racing	Ford
17	Darrell Waltrip	Darrell Waltrip Motorsports	Chevrolet
18	Bobby Labonte	Joe Gibbs Racing	Pontiac
21	Michael Waltrip	Wood Brothers Racing	Ford
22	Ward Burton	Bill Davis Racing	Pontiac
23	Jimmy Spencer	Haas-Carter Motorsports	Ford
24	Jeff Gordon	Hendrick Motorsports	Chevrolet
26	Johnny Benson Jr.	Roush Racing	Ford
28	Kenny Irwin Jr. (R)	Robert Yates Racing	Ford
29	Jeff Green	Diamond Ridge Motorsports	Chevrolet
30	Derrike Cope	Bahari Racing	Pontiac
31	Mike Skinner	Richard Childress Racing	Chevrolet
33	Ken Schrader	Andy Petree Racing	Chevrolet
35	Todd Bodine	ISM Racing	Pontiac
36	Ernie Irvan	MB2 Motorsports	Pontiac
40	Sterling Marlin	Team SABCO	Chevrolet
41	Steve Grissom	Larry Hedrick Motorsports	Chevrolet
42	Joe Nemechek	Team SABCO	Chevrolet
43	John Andretti	Petty Enterprises	Pontiac
44	Kyle Petty	Petty Enterprises	Pontiac
46	Wally Dallenbach Jr.	Team SABCO	Chevrolet
50	Ricky Craven	Hendrick Motorsports	Chevrolet
71	Dave Marcis	Marcis Auto Racing	Chevrolet
75	Rick Mast	Butch Mock Motorsports	Ford
77	Robert Pressley	Jasper Motorsports	Ford
78	Gary Bradberry	Triad Motorsports	Ford
81	Kenny Wallace	FILMAR Racing	Ford
88	Dale Jarrett	Robert Yates Racing	Ford
90	Dick Trickle	Donlavey Racing	Ford
91	Kevin Lepage (R)	LJ Racing	Chevrolet
94	Bill Elliott	Elliott-Marino Racing	Ford
95	Andy Hillenburg	Sadler Brothers Racing	Chevrolet
96	David Green	American Equipment Racing	Chevrolet
97	Chad Little	Roush Racing	Ford
98	Greg Sacks	Cale Yarborough Motorsports	Ford
99	Jeff Burton	Roush Racing	Ford

*Was replaced by Phil Parsons after injuring himself in first practice.

== Practice ==
Originally, two practice sessions were scheduled to be held, with one on Friday, March 6, and one on Saturday, March 7, However, due to rain on Saturday, the Saturday practice session was cancelled.

The only practice session was held on Friday, March 6. Robert Pressley, driving for Jasper Motorsports, would set the fastest time in the session, with a lap of 29.359 and an average speed of 188.834 mph (303.899 km/h).

During the session, Dale Earnhardt, Inc. rookie driver Steve Park would blow a tire heading into turn 4, causing him to slam the outside wall. The car, which had lost brakes by this point, would then proceed to ricochet again into front stretch outside wall two times. After proceeding the second front stretch hit, the car would proceed to head onto pit road, where Park slammed the pit road wall, with the car eventually stopping. Park would suffer fractures of the right thighbone, the left shoulder blade and collarbone and two broken front teeth. In replacement, Phil Parsons would attempt to qualify the car. Park was out for five months before eventually returning in the 1998 Brickyard 400.

Pos.	#	Driver	Team	Make	Time	Speed
1	77	Robert Pressley	Jasper Motorsports	Ford	28.882	191.953
2	6	Mark Martin	Roush Racing	Ford	28.913	191.748
3	42	Joe Nemechek	Team SABCO	Chevrolet	28.914	191.741
Full practice results

== Qualifying ==
Qualifying was originally meant to be split into two rounds, with the first round ran on Friday, March 6, and the second round on Saturday, March 7. However, due to rain, second-round qualifying was instead condensed into one round ran on Friday.

Qualifying was held on Friday, March 6, at 12:00 PM EST. Each driver would have one lap to set at time. On January 24, 1998, NASCAR would announce that the amount of provisionals given would be increased from last season. Positions 37-43 would be based on provisionals. Six spots are awarded by the use of provisionals based on owner's points. The seventh is awarded to a past champion who has not otherwise qualified for the race. If no past champion needs the provisional, the next team in the owner points will be awarded a provisional.

John Andretti, driving for Petty Enterprises, would win the pole, setting a time of 28.732 and an average speed of 192.956 miles per hour (310.533 km/h).

Seven drivers would fail to qualify: Chad Little, Sterling Marlin, Morgan Shepherd, Andy Hillenburg, Dave Marcis, Phil Parsons, and Jeff Green.

=== Full qualifying results ===
Pos.	#	Driver	Team	Make	Time	Speed
1	43	John Andretti	Petty Enterprises	Pontiac	28.732	192.956
2	35	Todd Bodine	ISM Racing	Pontiac	28.749	192.841
3	90	Dick Trickle	Donlavey Racing	Ford	28.766	192.728
4	88	Dale Jarrett	Robert Yates Racing	Ford	28.835	192.266
5	28	Kenny Irwin Jr. (R)	Robert Yates Racing	Ford	28.842	192.220
6	6	Mark Martin	Roush Racing	Ford	28.844	192.206
7	77	Robert Pressley	Jasper Motorsports	Ford	28.874	192.007
8	5	Terry Labonte	Hendrick Motorsports	Chevrolet	28.890	191.900
9	24	Jeff Gordon	Hendrick Motorsports	Chevrolet	28.903	191.814
10	99	Jeff Burton	Roush Racing	Ford	28.912	191.754
11	23	Jimmy Spencer	Travis Carter Enterprises	Ford	28.918	191.715
12	46	Wally Dallenbach Jr.	Team SABCO	Chevrolet	28.929	191.642
13	9	Lake Speed	Melling Racing	Ford	28.949	191.509
14	18	Bobby Labonte	Joe Gibbs Racing	Pontiac	28.954	191.476
15	26	Johnny Benson Jr.	Roush Racing	Ford	28.980	191.304
16	31	Mike Skinner	Richard Childress Racing	Chevrolet	28.987	191.258
17	22	Ward Burton	Bill Davis Racing	Pontiac	28.990	191.238
18	7	Geoff Bodine	Mattei Motorsports	Ford	29.011	191.100
19	30	Derrike Cope	Bahari Racing	Pontiac	29.067	190.732
20	78	Gary Bradberry	Triad Motorsports	Ford	29.079	190.653
21	42	Joe Nemechek	Team SABCO	Chevrolet	29.080	190.646
22	2	Rusty Wallace	Penske-Kranefuss Racing	Ford	29.083	190.627
23	10	Ricky Rudd	Rudd Performance Motorsports	Ford	29.090	190.581
24	81	Kenny Wallace	FILMAR Racing	Ford	29.121	190.378
25	75	Rick Mast	Butch Mock Motorsports	Ford	29.132	190.306
26	12	Jeremy Mayfield	Penske-Kranefuss Racing	Ford	29.146	190.215
27	11	Brett Bodine	Brett Bodine Racing	Ford	29.203	189.844
28	8	Hut Stricklin	Stavola Brothers Racing	Chevrolet	29.226	189.694
29	98	Greg Sacks	Cale Yarborough Motorsports	Ford	29.227	189.688
30	3	Dale Earnhardt	Richard Childress Racing	Chevrolet	29.243	189.584
31	94	Bill Elliott	Elliott-Marino Racing	Ford	29.252	189.526
32	21	Michael Waltrip	Wood Brothers Racing	Ford	29.254	189.513
33	96	David Green	American Equipment Racing	Chevrolet	29.258	189.487
34	91	Kevin Lepage (R)	LJ Racing	Chevrolet	29.272	189.396
35	13	Jerry Nadeau (R)	Elliott-Marino Racing	Ford	29.273	189.390
36	50	Ricky Craven	Hendrick Motorsports	Chevrolet	29.327	189.041
Provisionals
37	33	Ken Schrader	Andy Petree Racing	Chevrolet	29.344	188.931
38	16	Ted Musgrave	Roush Racing	Ford	29.571	187.481
39	44	Kyle Petty	Petty Enterprises	Pontiac	29.576	187.449
40	41	Steve Grissom	Larry Hedrick Motorsports	Chevrolet	29.470	188.124
41	4	Bobby Hamilton	Morgan–McClure Motorsports	Chevrolet	30.155	183.850
42	36	Ernie Irvan	MB2 Motorsports	Pontiac	29.367	188.783
Champion's Provisional
43	17	Darrell Waltrip	Darrell Waltrip Motorsports	Chevrolet	29.690	186.727
Failed to qualify
44	97	Chad Little	Roush Racing	Ford	29.347	188.912
45	40	Sterling Marlin	Team SABCO	Chevrolet	29.371	188.758
46	05	Morgan Shepherd	Shepherd Racing Ventures	Pontiac	29.403	188.552
47	95	Andy Hillenburg	Sadler Brothers Racing	Chevrolet	29.593	187.342
48	71	Dave Marcis	Marcis Auto Racing	Chevrolet	29.812	185.965
49	1	Phil Parsons	Dale Earnhardt, Inc.	Chevrolet	30.080	184.309
50	29	Jeff Green	Diamond Ridge Motorsports	Chevrolet	33.990	163.107
Official qualifying results

== Race results ==
Fin	St	#	Driver	Team	Make	Laps	Led	Status	Pts	Winnings
1	14	18	Bobby Labonte	Joe Gibbs Racing	Pontiac	325	47	running	180	$106,800
2	4	88	Dale Jarrett	Robert Yates Racing	Ford	325	29	running	175	$72,600
3	26	12	Jeremy Mayfield	Penske-Kranefuss Racing	Ford	325	11	running	170	$54,400
4	22	2	Rusty Wallace	Penske-Kranefuss Racing	Ford	325	0	running	160	$50,250
5	5	28	Kenny Irwin Jr. (R)	Robert Yates Racing	Ford	325	113	running	165	$58,150
6	3	90	Dick Trickle	Donlavey Racing	Ford	325	2	running	155	$45,750
7	24	81	Kenny Wallace	FILMAR Racing	Ford	325	17	running	151	$34,100
8	10	99	Jeff Burton	Roush Racing	Ford	325	0	running	142	$44,025
9	15	26	Johnny Benson Jr.	Roush Racing	Ford	324	1	running	143	$26,475
10	2	35	Todd Bodine	ISM Racing	Pontiac	324	46	running	139	$33,575
11	31	94	Bill Elliott	Elliott-Marino Racing	Ford	324	0	running	130	$40,545
12	8	5	Terry Labonte	Hendrick Motorsports	Chevrolet	324	16	running	132	$46,925
13	30	3	Dale Earnhardt	Richard Childress Racing	Chevrolet	324	2	running	129	$39,055
14	34	91	Kevin Lepage (R)	LJ Racing	Chevrolet	323	0	running	121	$24,685
15	42	36	Ernie Irvan	MB2 Motorsports	Pontiac	323	0	running	118	$37,655
16	40	41	Steve Grissom	Larry Hedrick Motorsports	Chevrolet	323	0	running	115	$35,495
17	37	33	Ken Schrader	Andy Petree Racing	Chevrolet	323	0	running	112	$35,135
18	32	21	Michael Waltrip	Wood Brothers Racing	Ford	323	0	running	109	$33,665
19	9	24	Jeff Gordon	Hendrick Motorsports	Chevrolet	323	0	running	106	$44,865
20	1	43	John Andretti	Petty Enterprises	Pontiac	323	33	running	108	$42,835
21	41	4	Bobby Hamilton	Morgan–McClure Motorsports	Chevrolet	323	0	running	100	$34,325
22	18	7	Geoff Bodine	Mattei Motorsports	Ford	323	2	running	102	$29,465
23	23	10	Ricky Rudd	Rudd Performance Motorsports	Ford	322	0	running	94	$38,555
24	17	22	Ward Burton	Bill Davis Racing	Pontiac	322	0	running	91	$32,720
25	6	6	Mark Martin	Roush Racing	Ford	321	2	running	93	$39,115
26	27	11	Brett Bodine	Brett Bodine Racing	Ford	321	0	running	85	$32,760
27	7	77	Robert Pressley	Jasper Motorsports	Ford	321	0	running	82	$21,750
28	13	9	Lake Speed	Melling Racing	Ford	321	0	running	79	$25,675
29	38	16	Ted Musgrave	Roush Racing	Ford	320	0	running	76	$32,135
30	33	96	David Green	American Equipment Racing	Chevrolet	319	0	running	73	$24,675
31	29	98	Greg Sacks	Cale Yarborough Motorsports	Ford	319	0	running	70	$31,515
32	35	13	Jerry Nadeau (R)	Elliott-Marino Racing	Ford	318	0	running	67	$21,255
33	25	75	Rick Mast	Butch Mock Motorsports	Ford	314	0	running	64	$24,260
34	36	50	Ricky Craven	Hendrick Motorsports	Chevrolet	308	0	running	61	$31,125
35	21	42	Joe Nemechek	Team SABCO	Chevrolet	305	0	running	58	$31,090
36	39	44	Kyle Petty	Petty Enterprises	Pontiac	267	0	engine	55	$30,565
37	28	8	Hut Stricklin	Stavola Brothers Racing	Chevrolet	255	0	running	52	$21,050
38	19	30	Derrike Cope	Bahari Racing	Pontiac	203	4	crash	54	$28,400
39	12	46	Wally Dallenbach Jr.	Team SABCO	Chevrolet	177	0	engine	46	$20,995
40	43	17	Darrell Waltrip	Darrell Waltrip Motorsports	Chevrolet	136	0	handling	43	$27,985
41	11	23	Jimmy Spencer	Travis Carter Enterprises	Ford	83	0	engine	40	$27,975
42	16	31	Mike Skinner	Richard Childress Racing	Chevrolet	17	0	crash	37	$20,965
43	20	78	Gary Bradberry	Triad Motorsports	Ford	12	0	ignition	34	$20,955
Official race results

Previous race: 1998 Las Vegas 400	NASCAR Winston Cup Series; 1998 season	Next race: 1998 TranSouth Financial 400
