= 1998 Pennsylvania 500 =

18th race of the 1998 NASCAR Winston Cup Series

Race details
- Race 18 of 33 in the 1998 NASCAR Winston Cup Series
- The 1998 Pennsylvania 500 program cover, featuring Jeremy Mayfield.
- Date: July 26, 1998
- Official name: 26th Annual Pennsylvania 500
- Location: Long Pond, Pennsylvania, Pocono Raceway
- Course: Permanent racing facility
- Course length: 2.5 miles (4.0 km)
- Distance: 200 laps, 500 mi (804.672 km)
- Average speed: 134.66 miles per hour (216.71 km/h)

Pole position
Driver	Ward Burton	Bill Davis Racing
- Time: 53.316

Most laps led
Driver	Jeff Gordon	Hendrick Motorsports
- Laps: 164

Winner
No. 24	Jeff Gordon	Hendrick Motorsports

Television in the United States
- Network: TBS
- Announcers: Ken Squier, Buddy Baker, Dick Berggren

Radio in the United States
- Radio: Motor Racing Network

The 1998 Pennsylvania 500 was the 18th stock car race of the 1998 NASCAR Winston Cup Series season and the 26th iteration of the event. The race was held on Sunday, July 26, 1998, in Long Pond, Pennsylvania, at Pocono Raceway, a 2.5 miles (4.0 km) triangular permanent course. The race took the scheduled 200 laps to complete. At race's end, Hendrick Motorsports driver Jeff Gordon would dominate the majority of the race to take his 34th career NASCAR Winston Cup Series victory and his fifth victory of the season. To fill out the podium, Mark Martin and Jeff Burton, both drivers for Roush Racing, would finish second and third, respectively.

== Background ==
The layout of Pocono Raceway, the venue where the race was held.

The race was held at Pocono Raceway, which is a three-turn superspeedway located in Long Pond, Pennsylvania. Pocono Raceway is one of a very few NASCAR tracks not owned by either Speedway Motorsports or NASCAR. It is operated by the Igdalsky siblings Brandon, Nicholas, and sister Ashley, and cousins Joseph IV and Chase Mattioli, all of whom are third-generation members of the family-owned Mattco Inc, started by Joseph II and Rose Mattioli.

=== Entry list ===
- (R) denotes rookie driver.

#	Driver	Team	Make
1	Darrell Waltrip	Dale Earnhardt, Inc.	Chevrolet
2	Rusty Wallace	Penske-Kranefuss Racing	Ford
3	Dale Earnhardt	Richard Childress Racing	Chevrolet
4	Bobby Hamilton	Morgan–McClure Motorsports	Chevrolet
5	Terry Labonte	Hendrick Motorsports	Chevrolet
6	Mark Martin	Roush Racing	Ford
7	Geoff Bodine	Mattei Motorsports	Ford
9	Jerry Nadeau (R)	Melling Racing	Ford
10	Ricky Rudd	Rudd Performance Motorsports	Ford
11	Brett Bodine	Brett Bodine Racing	Ford
12	Jeremy Mayfield	Penske-Kranefuss Racing	Ford
13	Jerry Nadeau (R)	Elliott-Marino Racing	Ford
16	Ted Musgrave	Roush Racing	Ford
18	Bobby Labonte	Joe Gibbs Racing	Pontiac
21	Michael Waltrip	Wood Brothers Racing	Ford
22	Ward Burton	Bill Davis Racing	Pontiac
23	Jimmy Spencer	Haas-Carter Motorsports	Ford
24	Jeff Gordon	Hendrick Motorsports	Chevrolet
26	Johnny Benson Jr.	Roush Racing	Ford
28	Kenny Irwin Jr. (R)	Robert Yates Racing	Ford
30	Derrike Cope	Bahari Racing	Pontiac
31	Mike Skinner	Richard Childress Racing	Chevrolet
33	Ken Schrader	Andy Petree Racing	Chevrolet
35	Jimmy Horton	ISM Racing	Pontiac
36	Ernie Irvan	MB2 Motorsports	Pontiac
40	Sterling Marlin	Team SABCO	Chevrolet
41	Steve Grissom	Larry Hedrick Motorsports	Chevrolet
42	Joe Nemechek	Team SABCO	Chevrolet
43	John Andretti	Petty Enterprises	Pontiac
44	Kyle Petty	Petty Enterprises	Pontiac
46	Jeff Green	Team SABCO	Chevrolet
50	Ricky Craven	Hendrick Motorsports	Chevrolet
71	Dave Marcis	Marcis Auto Racing	Chevrolet
75	Rick Mast	Butch Mock Motorsports	Ford
77	Robert Pressley	Jasper Motorsports	Ford
78	Gary Bradberry	Triad Motorsports	Ford
79	Randy MacDonald	T.R.I.X. Racing	Chevrolet
81	Kenny Wallace	FILMAR Racing	Ford
88	Dale Jarrett	Robert Yates Racing	Ford
90	Dick Trickle	Donlavey Racing	Ford
91	Morgan Shepherd	LJ Racing	Chevrolet
94	Bill Elliott	Elliott-Marino Racing	Ford
96	Hut Stricklin	American Equipment Racing	Chevrolet
97	Chad Little	Roush Racing	Ford
98	Rich Bickle	Cale Yarborough Motorsports	Ford
99	Jeff Burton	Roush Racing	Ford

== Practice ==
=== First practice ===
The first practice session was held on Friday, July 24, at 10:35 AM EST. The session would last for one hour and 25 minutes. Ward Burton, driving for Bill Davis Racing, would set the fastest time in the session, with a lap of 53.956 and an average speed of 166.809 mph (268.453 km/h).

Pos.	#	Driver	Team	Make	Time	Speed
1	22	Ward Burton	Bill Davis Racing	Pontiac	53.956	166.809
2	6	Mark Martin	Roush Racing	Ford	54.049	166.516
3	12	Jeremy Mayfield	Penske-Kranefuss Racing	Ford	54.172	166.137
Full first practice results

=== Second practice ===
The second practice session was held on Saturday, July 25, at 9:30 AM EST. The session would last for one hour and 30 minutes. Mark Martin, driving for Roush Racing, would set the fastest time in the session, with a lap of 53.637 and an average speed of 167.795 mph (270.040 km/h).

Pos.	#	Driver	Team	Make	Time	Speed
1	6	Mark Martin	Roush Racing	Ford	53.637	167.795
2	2	Rusty Wallace	Penske-Kranefuss Racing	Ford	53.699	167.601
3	10	Ricky Rudd	Rudd Performance Motorsports	Ford	53.704	167.585
Full second practice results

=== Final practice ===
The final practice session, sometimes referred to as Happy Hour, was held on Saturday, July 25. The session would last for one hour. Jeff Gordon, driving for Hendrick Motorsports, would set the fastest time in the session, with a lap of 54.285 and an average speed of 165.792 mph (266.816 km/h).

Pos.	#	Driver	Team	Make	Time	Speed
1	24	Jeff Gordon	Hendrick Motorsports	Chevrolet	54.285	165.792
2	22	Ward Burton	Bill Davis Racing	Pontiac	54.288	165.782
3	2	Rusty Wallace	Penske-Kranefuss Racing	Ford	54.316	165.697
Full Happy Hour practice results

== Qualifying ==
Qualifying was split into two rounds. The first round was held on Friday, July 24, at 3:00 PM EST. Each driver would have one lap to set a time. During the first round, the top 25 drivers in the round would be guaranteed a starting spot in the race. If a driver was not able to guarantee a spot in the first round, they had the option to scrub their time from the first round and try and run a faster lap time in a second round qualifying run, held on Saturday, July 25, at 11:30 AM EST. As with the first round, each driver would have one lap to set a time. On January 24, 1998, NASCAR would announce that the amount of provisionals given would be increased from last season. Positions 26-36 would be decided on time, while positions 37-43 would be based on provisionals. Six spots are awarded by the use of provisionals based on owner's points. The seventh is awarded to a past champion who has not otherwise qualified for the race. If no past champion needs the provisional, the next team in the owner points will be awarded a provisional.

Ward Burton, driving for Bill Davis Racing, would win the pole, setting a time of 53.316 and an average speed of 168.805 miles per hour (271.665 km/h).

Three drivers would fail to qualify: Randy MacDonald, Gary Bradberry, and Jimmy Horton.

=== Full qualifying results ===
Pos.	#	Driver	Team	Make	Time	Speed
1	22	Ward Burton	Bill Davis Racing	Pontiac	53.316	168.805
2	24	Jeff Gordon	Hendrick Motorsports	Chevrolet	53.492	168.249
3	2	Rusty Wallace	Penske-Kranefuss Racing	Ford	53.592	167.936
4	18	Bobby Labonte	Joe Gibbs Racing	Pontiac	53.623	167.838
5	42	Joe Nemechek	Team SABCO	Chevrolet	53.640	167.785
6	6	Mark Martin	Roush Racing	Ford	53.668	167.698
7	91	Morgan Shepherd	LJ Racing	Chevrolet	53.706	167.579
8	81	Kenny Wallace	FILMAR Racing	Ford	53.763	167.401
9	3	Dale Earnhardt	Richard Childress Racing	Chevrolet	53.790	167.317
10	21	Michael Waltrip	Wood Brothers Racing	Ford	53.814	167.243
11	88	Dale Jarrett	Robert Yates Racing	Ford	53.816	167.237
12	16	Ted Musgrave	Roush Racing	Ford	53.861	167.097
13	10	Ricky Rudd	Rudd Performance Motorsports	Ford	53.867	167.078
14	28	Kenny Irwin Jr. (R)	Robert Yates Racing	Ford	53.930	166.883
15	46	Jeff Green	Team SABCO	Chevrolet	53.932	166.877
16	36	Ernie Irvan	MB2 Motorsports	Pontiac	53.942	166.846
17	33	Ken Schrader	Andy Petree Racing	Chevrolet	53.986	166.710
18	43	John Andretti	Petty Enterprises	Pontiac	53.990	166.698
19	99	Jeff Burton	Roush Racing	Ford	54.010	166.636
20	41	Steve Grissom	Larry Hedrick Motorsports	Chevrolet	54.038	166.549
21	23	Jimmy Spencer	Travis Carter Enterprises	Ford	54.047	166.522
22	5	Terry Labonte	Hendrick Motorsports	Chevrolet	54.053	166.503
23	97	Chad Little	Roush Racing	Ford	54.080	166.420
24	50	Ricky Craven	Hendrick Motorsports	Chevrolet	54.084	166.408
25	71	Dave Marcis	Marcis Auto Racing	Chevrolet	54.111	166.325
26	90	Dick Trickle	Donlavey Racing	Ford	54.039	166.546
27	1	Darrell Waltrip	Dale Earnhardt, Inc.	Chevrolet	54.112	166.322
28	31	Mike Skinner	Richard Childress Racing	Chevrolet	54.129	166.269
29	12	Jeremy Mayfield	Penske-Kranefuss Racing	Ford	54.143	166.226
30	75	Rick Mast	Butch Mock Motorsports	Ford	54.152	166.199
31	40	Sterling Marlin	Team SABCO	Chevrolet	54.162	166.168
32	96	Hut Stricklin	American Equipment Racing	Chevrolet	54.173	166.134
33	94	Bill Elliott	Elliott-Marino Racing	Ford	54.208	166.027
34	9	Jerry Nadeau (R)	Melling Racing	Ford	54.229	165.963
35	44	Kyle Petty	Petty Enterprises	Pontiac	54.286	165.789
36	26	Johnny Benson Jr.	Roush Racing	Ford	54.311	165.712
Provisionals
37	4	Bobby Hamilton	Morgan–McClure Motorsports	Chevrolet	-*	-*
38	11	Brett Bodine	Brett Bodine Racing	Ford	-*	-*
39	77	Robert Pressley	Jasper Motorsports	Ford	-*	-*
40	7	Geoff Bodine	Mattei Motorsports	Ford	-*	-*
41	30	Derrike Cope	Bahari Racing	Pontiac	-*	-*
42	13	Wally Dallenbach Jr.	Elliott-Marino Racing	Ford	-*	-*
43	98	Rich Bickle	Cale Yarborough Motorsports	Ford	-*	-*
Failed to qualify
44	79	Randy MacDonald	T.R.I.X. Racing	Chevrolet	55.252	162.890
45	78	Gary Bradberry	Triad Motorsports	Ford	54.913	163.896
46	35	Jimmy Horton	ISM Racing	Pontiac	55.708	161.557
Official qualifying results

*Time not available.

== Race results ==
Fin	St	#	Driver	Team	Make	Laps	Led	Status	Pts	Winnings
1	2	24	Jeff Gordon	Hendrick Motorsports	Chevrolet	200	164	running	185	$162,770
2	6	6	Mark Martin	Roush Racing	Ford	200	2	running	175	$89,220
3	19	99	Jeff Burton	Roush Racing	Ford	200	1	running	170	$73,170
4	4	18	Bobby Labonte	Joe Gibbs Racing	Pontiac	200	0	running	160	$75,545
5	11	88	Dale Jarrett	Robert Yates Racing	Ford	200	0	running	155	$63,815
6	3	2	Rusty Wallace	Penske-Kranefuss Racing	Ford	200	3	running	155	$49,990
7	9	3	Dale Earnhardt	Richard Childress Racing	Chevrolet	200	14	running	151	$49,890
8	17	33	Ken Schrader	Andy Petree Racing	Chevrolet	200	0	running	142	$52,290
9	16	36	Ernie Irvan	MB2 Motorsports	Pontiac	200	0	running	138	$42,390
10	10	21	Michael Waltrip	Wood Brothers Racing	Ford	200	1	running	139	$47,440
11	31	40	Sterling Marlin	Team SABCO	Chevrolet	200	0	running	130	$33,890
12	18	43	John Andretti	Petty Enterprises	Pontiac	200	0	running	127	$44,740
13	27	1	Darrell Waltrip	Dale Earnhardt, Inc.	Chevrolet	200	0	running	124	$30,890
14	40	7	Geoff Bodine	Mattei Motorsports	Ford	200	0	running	121	$39,090
15	12	16	Ted Musgrave	Roush Racing	Ford	200	0	running	118	$39,015
16	23	97	Chad Little	Roush Racing	Ford	200	0	running	115	$29,665
17	5	42	Joe Nemechek	Team SABCO	Chevrolet	200	0	running	112	$36,065
18	29	12	Jeremy Mayfield	Penske-Kranefuss Racing	Ford	200	0	running	109	$35,765
19	21	23	Jimmy Spencer	Travis Carter Enterprises	Ford	199	0	running	106	$37,715
20	37	4	Bobby Hamilton	Morgan–McClure Motorsports	Chevrolet	199	0	running	103	$41,740
21	35	44	Kyle Petty	Petty Enterprises	Pontiac	199	0	running	100	$34,865
22	14	28	Kenny Irwin Jr. (R)	Robert Yates Racing	Ford	199	0	running	97	$41,165
23	41	30	Derrike Cope	Bahari Racing	Pontiac	199	0	running	94	$34,340
24	15	46	Jeff Green	Team SABCO	Chevrolet	198	0	running	91	$23,715
25	42	13	Wally Dallenbach Jr.	Elliott-Marino Racing	Ford	198	0	running	88	$26,890
26	34	9	Jerry Nadeau (R)	Melling Racing	Ford	198	0	running	85	$26,640
27	32	96	Hut Stricklin	American Equipment Racing	Chevrolet	198	0	running	82	$26,890
28	43	98	Rich Bickle	Cale Yarborough Motorsports	Ford	197	0	running	79	$30,140
29	26	90	Dick Trickle	Donlavey Racing	Ford	196	0	running	76	$33,465
30	28	31	Mike Skinner	Richard Childress Racing	Chevrolet	195	0	running	73	$25,815
31	22	5	Terry Labonte	Hendrick Motorsports	Chevrolet	192	0	running	70	$38,685
32	39	77	Robert Pressley	Jasper Motorsports	Ford	180	0	running	67	$25,015
33	36	26	Johnny Benson Jr.	Roush Racing	Ford	175	0	running	64	$29,315
34	1	22	Ward Burton	Bill Davis Racing	Pontiac	171	15	crash	66	$36,815
35	8	81	Kenny Wallace	FILMAR Racing	Ford	168	0	valve	58	$21,490
36	33	94	Bill Elliott	Elliott-Marino Racing	Ford	166	0	crash	55	$28,390
37	30	75	Rick Mast	Butch Mock Motorsports	Ford	165	0	running	52	$21,300
38	38	11	Brett Bodine	Brett Bodine Racing	Ford	153	0	running	49	$28,150
39	20	41	Steve Grissom	Larry Hedrick Motorsports	Chevrolet	151	0	engine	46	$28,125
40	7	91	Morgan Shepherd	LJ Racing	Chevrolet	143	0	rear end	43	$21,100
41	24	50	Ricky Craven	Hendrick Motorsports	Chevrolet	142	0	running	40	$28,075
42	13	10	Ricky Rudd	Rudd Performance Motorsports	Ford	136	0	radiator	37	$37,450
43	25	71	Dave Marcis	Marcis Auto Racing	Chevrolet	110	0	crash	34	$21,025
Official race results

Previous race: 1998 Jiffy Lube 300	NASCAR Winston Cup Series; 1998 season	Next race: 1998 Brickyard 400
