= Bradberry =

Bradberry is a surname. Notable people with the surname include:

- Gary Bradberry, American stock car racing driver
- James Bradberry, American football player
- Stephen Bradberry, American community organizer in New Orleans, Louisiana
- Charlie Bradberry, American NASCAR driver
- David Bradberry, English nonconformist minister

== Other ==
- Bradberry, Arizona, populated place situated in Cochise County, Arizona

== See also ==
- Bradbury (surname)
- Bradbury (disambiguation)
- Bradbeer (surname)
