= 1998 GM Goodwrench Service Plus 400 =

Second race of the 1998 NASCAR Winston Cup Series

Race details
- Race 2 of 33 in the 1998 NASCAR Winston Cup Series
- The 1998 GM Goodwrench Service Plus 400 program cover, featuring Dale Earnhardt.
- Date: February 22, 1998
- Official name: 33rd Annual GM Goodwrench Service Plus 400
- Location: Rockingham, North Carolina, North Carolina Speedway
- Course: Permanent racing facility
- Course length: 1.017 miles (1.637 km)
- Distance: 393 laps, 399.681 mi (643.224 km)
- Average speed: 117.065 miles per hour (188.398 km/h)

Pole position
Driver	Rick Mast	Butch Mock Motorsports
- Time: 23.415

Most laps led
Driver	Mark Martin	Roush Racing
- Laps: 104

Winner
No. 24	Jeff Gordon	Hendrick Motorsports

Television in the United States
- Network: TNN
- Announcers: Eli Gold, Buddy Baker, Dick Berggren

Radio in the United States
- Radio: Motor Racing Network

The 1998 GM Goodwrench Service Plus 400 was the second stock car race of the 1998 NASCAR Winston Cup Series and the 33rd iteration of the event. The race was held on Sunday, February 22, 1998, in Rockingham, North Carolina, at North Carolina Speedway, a 1.017 miles (1.637 km) permanent high-banked racetrack. The race took the scheduled 393 laps to complete. Hendrick Motorsports driver Jeff Gordon would manage to claw his way after an initial bad start to the race within the closing laps to take his 30th career NASCAR Winston Cup Series victory and his first of the season. To fill out the podium, Penske-Kranefuss Racing driver Rusty Wallace and Roush Racing driver Mark Martin would finish second and third, respectively.

== Background ==
The layout of North Carolina Speedway, the venue where the race was held.

North Carolina Speedway is a 1 mi (1.609 km) D-shaped oval track in Rockingham, North Carolina. The track has held a variety of events since its opening in 1965, including the NASCAR Cup Series from 1965 to 2004, and currently the NASCAR O'Reilly Auto Parts Series and NASCAR Craftsman Truck Series. It has a 32,000-seat capacity as of 2012. Rockingham Speedway is owned by the International Hot Rod Association (IHRA).

=== Entry list ===
- (R) denotes rookie driver.

#	Driver	Team	Make
1	Steve Park (R)	Dale Earnhardt, Inc.	Chevrolet
2	Rusty Wallace	Penske-Kranefuss Racing	Ford
3	Dale Earnhardt	Richard Childress Racing	Chevrolet
4	Bobby Hamilton	Morgan–McClure Motorsports	Chevrolet
5	Terry Labonte	Hendrick Motorsports	Chevrolet
05	Morgan Shepherd	Shepherd Racing Ventures	Pontiac
6	Mark Martin	Roush Racing	Ford
7	Geoff Bodine	Mattei Motorsports	Ford
8	Hut Stricklin	Stavola Brothers Racing	Chevrolet
9	Lake Speed	Melling Racing	Ford
10	Ricky Rudd	Rudd Performance Motorsports	Ford
11	Brett Bodine	Brett Bodine Racing	Ford
12	Jeremy Mayfield	Penske-Kranefuss Racing	Ford
13	Jerry Nadeau (R)	Elliott-Marino Racing	Ford
16	Ted Musgrave	Roush Racing	Ford
17	Darrell Waltrip	Darrell Waltrip Motorsports	Chevrolet
18	Bobby Labonte	Joe Gibbs Racing	Pontiac
21	Michael Waltrip	Wood Brothers Racing	Ford
22	Ward Burton	Bill Davis Racing	Pontiac
23	Jimmy Spencer	Haas-Carter Motorsports	Ford
24	Jeff Gordon	Hendrick Motorsports	Chevrolet
26	Johnny Benson Jr.	Roush Racing	Ford
28	Kenny Irwin Jr. (R)	Robert Yates Racing	Ford
29	Jeff Green	Diamond Ridge Motorsports	Chevrolet
30	Derrike Cope	Bahari Racing	Pontiac
31	Mike Skinner	Richard Childress Racing	Chevrolet
33	Ken Schrader	Andy Petree Racing	Chevrolet
35	Todd Bodine	ISM Racing	Pontiac
36	Ernie Irvan	MB2 Motorsports	Pontiac
40	Sterling Marlin	Team SABCO	Chevrolet
41	Steve Grissom	Larry Hedrick Motorsports	Chevrolet
42	Joe Nemechek	Team SABCO	Chevrolet
43	John Andretti	Petty Enterprises	Pontiac
44	Kyle Petty	Petty Enterprises	Pontiac
46	Wally Dallenbach Jr.	Team SABCO	Chevrolet
50	Ricky Craven	Hendrick Motorsports	Chevrolet
71	Dave Marcis	Marcis Auto Racing	Chevrolet
75	Rick Mast	Butch Mock Motorsports	Ford
77	Robert Pressley	Jasper Motorsports	Ford
78	Gary Bradberry	Triad Motorsports	Ford
81	Kenny Wallace	FILMAR Racing	Ford
88	Dale Jarrett	Robert Yates Racing	Ford
90	Dick Trickle	Donlavey Racing	Ford
91	Kevin Lepage (R)	LJ Racing	Chevrolet
94	Bill Elliott	Elliott-Marino Racing	Ford
96	David Green	American Equipment Racing	Chevrolet
97	Chad Little	Roush Racing	Ford
98	Greg Sacks	Cale Yarborough Motorsports	Ford
99	Jeff Burton	Roush Racing	Ford

== Practice ==
=== First practice ===
The first practice session was held on Friday, February 20. Dale Jarrett, driving for Robert Yates Racing, would set the fastest time in the session, with a lap of 23.654 and an average speed of 154.781 mph (249.096 km/h).

Pos.	#	Driver	Team	Make	Time	Speed
1	88	Dale Jarrett	Robert Yates Racing	Ford	23.654	154.781
2	43	John Andretti	Petty Enterprises	Pontiac	23.772	154.013
3	22	Ward Burton	Bill Davis Racing	Pontiac	23.791	153.890
Full first practice results

=== Final practice ===
The final practice session, sometimes referred to as Happy Hour, was held on Saturday, February 21. Johnny Benson Jr., driving for Roush Racing, would set the fastest time in the session, with a lap of 24.346 and an average speed of 150.382 mph (242.016 km/h).

Pos.	#	Driver	Team	Make	Time	Speed
1	26	Johnny Benson Jr.	Roush Racing	Ford	24.346	150.382
2	16	Ted Musgrave	Roush Racing	Ford	24.367	150.252
3	22	Ward Burton	Bill Davis Racing	Pontiac	24.380	150.172
Full Happy Hour practice results

== Qualifying ==
Qualifying was split into two rounds. The first round was held on Friday, February 20, at 2:30 PM EST. Each driver would have one lap to set a time. During the first round, the top 25 drivers in the round would be guaranteed a starting spot in the race. If a driver was not able to guarantee a spot in the first round, they had the option to scrub their time from the first round and try and run a faster lap time in a second round qualifying run, held on Saturday, February 21. As with the first round, each driver would have one lap to set a time. On January 24, 1998, NASCAR would announce that the amount of provisionals given would be increased from last season. Positions 26-36 would be decided on time, while positions 37-43 would be based on provisionals. Six spots are awarded by the use of provisionals based on owner's points. The seventh is awarded to a past champion who has not otherwise qualified for the race. If no past champion needs the provisional, the next team in the owner points will be awarded a provisional.

Rick Mast, driving for Butch Mock Motorsports, would win the pole, setting a time of 23.415 and an average speed of 156.361 miles per hour (251.639 km/h).

Six drivers would fail to qualify: Kevin Lepage, Todd Bodine, Wally Dallenbach Jr., Morgan Shepherd, Dave Marcis, and Gary Bradberry.

=== Full qualifying results ===
Pos.	#	Driver	Team	Make	Time	Speed
1	75	Rick Mast	Butch Mock Motorsports	Ford	23.415	156.361
2	81	Kenny Wallace	FILMAR Racing	Ford	23.540	155.531
3	96	David Green	American Equipment Racing	Chevrolet	23.546	155.491
4	24	Jeff Gordon	Hendrick Motorsports	Chevrolet	23.549	155.472
5	12	Jeremy Mayfield	Penske-Kranefuss Racing	Ford	23.561	155.392
6	6	Mark Martin	Roush Racing	Ford	23.567	155.353
7	2	Rusty Wallace	Penske-Kranefuss Racing	Ford	23.587	155.221
8	26	Johnny Benson Jr.	Roush Racing	Ford	23.612	155.057
9	43	John Andretti	Petty Enterprises	Pontiac	23.630	154.939
10	8	Hut Stricklin	Stavola Brothers Racing	Chevrolet	23.648	154.821
11	16	Ted Musgrave	Roush Racing	Ford	23.654	154.781
12	99	Jeff Burton	Roush Racing	Ford	23.655	154.775
13	21	Michael Waltrip	Wood Brothers Racing	Ford	23.658	154.755
14	22	Ward Burton	Bill Davis Racing	Pontiac	23.661	154.736
15	90	Dick Trickle	Donlavey Racing	Ford	23.668	154.690
16	94	Bill Elliott	Elliott-Marino Racing	Ford	23.672	154.664
17	42	Joe Nemechek	Team SABCO	Chevrolet	23.678	154.625
18	31	Mike Skinner	Richard Childress Racing	Chevrolet	23.687	154.566
19	1	Steve Park (R)	Dale Earnhardt, Inc.	Chevrolet	23.700	154.481
20	7	Geoff Bodine	Mattei Motorsports	Ford	23.714	154.390
21	5	Terry Labonte	Hendrick Motorsports	Chevrolet	23.744	154.195
22	50	Ricky Craven	Hendrick Motorsports	Chevrolet	23.771	154.020
23	41	Steve Grissom	Larry Hedrick Motorsports	Chevrolet	23.780	153.961
24	11	Brett Bodine	Brett Bodine Racing	Ford	23.783	153.942
25	44	Kyle Petty	Petty Enterprises	Pontiac	23.786	153.922
26	77	Robert Pressley	Jasper Motorsports	Ford	23.791	153.890
27	40	Sterling Marlin	Team SABCO	Chevrolet	23.797	153.851
28	23	Jimmy Spencer	Travis Carter Enterprises	Ford	23.807	153.787
29	28	Kenny Irwin Jr. (R)	Robert Yates Racing	Ford	23.809	153.774
30	10	Ricky Rudd	Rudd Performance Motorsports	Ford	23.810	153.767
31	33	Ken Schrader	Andy Petree Racing	Chevrolet	23.818	153.716
32	88	Dale Jarrett	Robert Yates Racing	Ford	23.829	153.645
33	4	Bobby Hamilton	Morgan–McClure Motorsports	Chevrolet	23.830	153.638
34	13	Jerry Nadeau (R)	Elliott-Marino Racing	Ford	23.830	153.638
35	30	Derrike Cope	Bahari Racing	Pontiac	23.831	153.632
36	29	Jeff Green	Diamond Ridge Motorsports	Chevrolet	23.835	153.606
Provisionals
37	3	Dale Earnhardt	Richard Childress Racing	Chevrolet	-*	-*
38	18	Bobby Labonte	Joe Gibbs Racing	Pontiac	-*	-*
39	98	Greg Sacks	Cale Yarborough Motorsports	Ford	-*	-*
40	36	Ernie Irvan	MB2 Motorsports	Pontiac	-*	-*
41	9	Lake Speed	Melling Racing	Ford	-*	-*
42	97	Chad Little	Roush Racing	Ford	-*	-*
Champion's Provisional
43	17	Darrell Waltrip	Darrell Waltrip Motorsports	Chevrolet	-*	-*
Failed to qualify
44	91	Kevin Lepage (R)	LJ Racing	Chevrolet	23.846	153.535
45	35	Todd Bodine	ISM Racing	Pontiac	23.867	153.400
46	46	Wally Dallenbach Jr.	Team SABCO	Chevrolet	23.949	152.875
47	05	Morgan Shepherd	Shepherd Racing Ventures	Pontiac	24.043	152.277
48	71	Dave Marcis	Marcis Auto Racing	Chevrolet	24.045	152.265
49	78	Gary Bradberry	Triad Motorsports	Ford	24.917	146.936
Official qualifying results

== Race results ==
Fin	St	#	Driver	Team	Make	Laps	Led	Status	Pts	Winnings
1	4	24	Jeff Gordon	Hendrick Motorsports	Chevrolet	393	73	running	180	$90,090
2	7	2	Rusty Wallace	Penske-Kranefuss Racing	Ford	393	74	running	175	$49,240
3	6	6	Mark Martin	Roush Racing	Ford	393	104	running	175	$51,940
4	28	23	Jimmy Spencer	Travis Carter Enterprises	Ford	393	0	running	160	$45,120
5	20	7	Geoff Bodine	Mattei Motorsports	Ford	393	11	running	160	$39,225
6	16	94	Bill Elliott	Elliott-Marino Racing	Ford	393	3	running	155	$35,225
7	32	88	Dale Jarrett	Robert Yates Racing	Ford	393	7	running	151	$42,500
8	21	5	Terry Labonte	Hendrick Motorsports	Chevrolet	393	0	running	142	$36,625
9	33	4	Bobby Hamilton	Morgan–McClure Motorsports	Chevrolet	393	1	running	143	$31,825
10	22	50	Ricky Craven	Hendrick Motorsports	Chevrolet	393	6	running	139	$36,025
11	14	22	Ward Burton	Bill Davis Racing	Pontiac	393	0	running	130	$30,750
12	1	75	Rick Mast	Butch Mock Motorsports	Ford	393	58	running	132	$33,700
13	9	43	John Andretti	Petty Enterprises	Pontiac	393	0	running	124	$32,600
14	5	12	Jeremy Mayfield	Penske-Kranefuss Racing	Ford	392	17	running	126	$28,400
15	35	30	Derrike Cope	Bahari Racing	Pontiac	392	0	running	118	$29,500
16	24	11	Brett Bodine	Brett Bodine Racing	Ford	392	0	running	115	$28,750
17	37	3	Dale Earnhardt	Richard Childress Racing	Chevrolet	392	1	running	117	$32,100
18	12	99	Jeff Burton	Roush Racing	Ford	392	0	running	109	$33,500
19	40	36	Ernie Irvan	MB2 Motorsports	Pontiac	391	0	running	106	$26,950
20	23	41	Steve Grissom	Larry Hedrick Motorsports	Chevrolet	391	0	running	103	$28,850
21	42	97	Chad Little	Roush Racing	Ford	391	0	running	100	$19,500
22	36	29	Jeff Green	Diamond Ridge Motorsports	Chevrolet	391	0	running	97	$19,100
23	31	33	Ken Schrader	Andy Petree Racing	Chevrolet	391	0	running	94	$25,850
24	25	44	Kyle Petty	Petty Enterprises	Pontiac	391	0	running	91	$25,650
25	27	40	Sterling Marlin	Team SABCO	Chevrolet	391	0	running	88	$18,450
26	29	28	Kenny Irwin Jr. (R)	Robert Yates Racing	Ford	390	0	running	85	$31,340
27	41	9	Lake Speed	Melling Racing	Ford	390	0	running	82	$19,340
28	34	13	Jerry Nadeau (R)	Elliott-Marino Racing	Ford	390	0	running	79	$15,190
29	10	8	Hut Stricklin	Stavola Brothers Racing	Chevrolet	389	0	running	76	$17,515
30	8	26	Johnny Benson Jr.	Roush Racing	Ford	388	38	valve	78	$14,965
31	19	1	Steve Park (R)	Dale Earnhardt, Inc.	Chevrolet	374	0	crash	70	$14,765
32	18	31	Mike Skinner	Richard Childress Racing	Chevrolet	366	0	crash	67	$14,715
33	38	18	Bobby Labonte	Joe Gibbs Racing	Pontiac	364	0	crash	64	$29,565
34	13	21	Michael Waltrip	Wood Brothers Racing	Ford	363	0	crash	61	$21,515
35	11	16	Ted Musgrave	Roush Racing	Ford	363	0	running	58	$21,415
36	39	98	Greg Sacks	Cale Yarborough Motorsports	Ford	362	0	running	55	$21,390
37	15	90	Dick Trickle	Donlavey Racing	Ford	316	0	radiator	52	$21,365
38	2	81	Kenny Wallace	FILMAR Racing	Ford	272	0	crash	49	$14,590
39	17	42	Joe Nemechek	Team SABCO	Chevrolet	269	0	crash	46	$21,315
40	26	77	Robert Pressley	Jasper Motorsports	Ford	130	0	brakes	43	$14,290
41	43	17	Darrell Waltrip	Darrell Waltrip Motorsports	Chevrolet	123	0	crash	40	$21,265
42	3	96	David Green	American Equipment Racing	Chevrolet	106	0	crash	37	$14,340
43	30	10	Ricky Rudd	Rudd Performance Motorsports	Ford	90	0	engine	34	$30,615
Official race results

Previous race: 1998 Daytona 500	NASCAR Winston Cup Series; 1998 season	Next race: 1998 Las Vegas 400
