= 1998 Jiffy Lube 300 =

17th race of the 1998 NASCAR Winston Cup Series

Race details
- Race 17 of 33 in the 1998 NASCAR Winston Cup Series
- The 1998 Jiffy Lube 300 program cover.
- Date: July 12, 1998
- Official name: 6th Annual Jiffy Lube 300
- Location: Loudon, New Hampshire, New Hampshire International Speedway
- Course: Permanent racing facility
- Course length: 1.058 miles (1.704 km)
- Distance: 300 laps, 317.4 mi (510.805 km)
- Average speed: 102.996 miles per hour (165.756 km/h)

Pole position
Driver	Ricky Craven	Hendrick Motorsports
- Time: 29.665

Most laps led
Driver	Jeff Burton	Roush Racing
- Laps: 191

Winner
No. 99	Jeff Burton	Roush Racing

Television in the United States
- Network: TNN
- Announcers: Eli Gold, Buddy Baker, Dick Berggren

Radio in the United States
- Radio: Motor Racing Network

The 1998 Jiffy Lube 300 was the 17th stock car race of the 1998 NASCAR Winston Cup Series season and the 10th iteration of the event. The race was held on Sunday, July 12, 1998, in Loudon, New Hampshire, at New Hampshire International Speedway, a 1.058-mile (1.703 km) permanent, oval-shaped, low-banked racetrack. The race took the scheduled 300 laps to complete. At race's end, Roush Racing driver Jeff Burton would come to dominate most of the race to take his fourth career NASCAR Winston Cup Series victory and his first victory of the season. To fill out the podium, Roush Racing driver Mark Martin and Hendrick Motorsports driver Jeff Gordon would finish second and third, respectively.

== Background ==
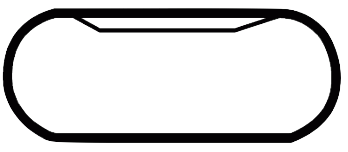
The layout of New Hampshire International Speedway, the venue where the race was held.

New Hampshire International Speedway is a 1.058-mile (1.703 km) oval speedway located in Loudon, New Hampshire which has hosted NASCAR racing annually since the early 1990s, as well as an IndyCar weekend and the oldest motorcycle race in North America, the Loudon Classic. Nicknamed "The Magic Mile", the speedway is often converted into a 1.6-mile (2.6 km) road course, which includes much of the oval. The track was originally the site of Bryar Motorsports Park before being purchased and redeveloped by Bob Bahre. The track is currently one of eight major NASCAR tracks owned and operated by Speedway Motorsports.

=== Entry list ===
- (R) denotes rookie driver.

#	Driver	Team	Make
1	Darrell Waltrip	Dale Earnhardt, Inc.	Chevrolet
2	Rusty Wallace	Penske-Kranefuss Racing	Ford
3	Dale Earnhardt	Richard Childress Racing	Chevrolet
4	Bobby Hamilton	Morgan–McClure Motorsports	Chevrolet
5	Terry Labonte	Hendrick Motorsports	Chevrolet
6	Mark Martin	Roush Racing	Ford
7	Geoff Bodine	Mattei Motorsports	Ford
9	Lake Speed	Melling Racing	Ford
10	Ricky Rudd	Rudd Performance Motorsports	Ford
11	Brett Bodine	Brett Bodine Racing	Ford
12	Jeremy Mayfield	Penske-Kranefuss Racing	Ford
13	Jerry Nadeau (R)	Elliott-Marino Racing	Ford
16	Ted Musgrave	Roush Racing	Ford
18	Bobby Labonte	Joe Gibbs Racing	Pontiac
21	Michael Waltrip	Wood Brothers Racing	Ford
22	Ward Burton	Bill Davis Racing	Pontiac
23	Jimmy Spencer	Haas-Carter Motorsports	Ford
24	Jeff Gordon	Hendrick Motorsports	Chevrolet
26	Johnny Benson Jr.	Roush Racing	Ford
28	Kenny Irwin Jr. (R)	Robert Yates Racing	Ford
30	Derrike Cope	Bahari Racing	Pontiac
31	Mike Skinner	Richard Childress Racing	Chevrolet
33	Ken Schrader	Andy Petree Racing	Chevrolet
35	Gary Bradberry	ISM Racing	Pontiac
36	Ernie Irvan	MB2 Motorsports	Pontiac
40	Sterling Marlin	Team SABCO	Chevrolet
41	Steve Grissom	Larry Hedrick Motorsports	Chevrolet
42	Joe Nemechek	Team SABCO	Chevrolet
43	John Andretti	Petty Enterprises	Pontiac
44	Kyle Petty	Petty Enterprises	Pontiac
46	Jeff Green	Team SABCO	Chevrolet
50	Ricky Craven	Hendrick Motorsports	Chevrolet
71	Dave Marcis	Marcis Auto Racing	Chevrolet
75	Rick Mast	Butch Mock Motorsports	Ford
77	Robert Pressley	Jasper Motorsports	Ford
81	Kenny Wallace	FILMAR Racing	Ford
88	Dale Jarrett	Robert Yates Racing	Ford
90	Dick Trickle	Donlavey Racing	Ford
91	Andy Hillenburg	LJ Racing	Chevrolet
94	Bill Elliott	Elliott-Marino Racing	Ford
96	Hut Stricklin	American Equipment Racing	Chevrolet
97	Chad Little	Roush Racing	Ford
98	Rich Bickle	Cale Yarborough Motorsports	Ford
99	Jeff Burton	Roush Racing	Ford

== Practice ==
=== First practice ===
The first practice session was held on the morning of Friday, July 10. Mark Martin, driving for Roush Racing, would set the fastest time in the session, with a lap of 29.419 and an average speed of 129.467 mph (208.357 km/h).

Pos.	#	Driver	Team	Make	Time	Speed
1	6	Mark Martin	Roush Racing	Ford	29.419	129.467
2	24	Jeff Gordon	Hendrick Motorsports	Chevrolet	29.477	129.213
3	40	Sterling Marlin	Team SABCO	Chevrolet	29.509	129.072
Full first practice results

=== Second practice ===
The second practice session was held on the afternoon of Friday, July 10. Ken Schrader, driving for Andy Petree Racing, would set the fastest time in the session, with a lap of 29.517 and an average speed of 129.038 mph (207.667 km/h).

Pos.	#	Driver	Team	Make	Time	Speed
1	33	Ken Schrader	Andy Petree Racing	Chevrolet	29.517	129.038
2	43	John Andretti	Petty Enterprises	Pontiac	29.523	129.011
3	44	Kyle Petty	Petty Enterprises	Pontiac	29.534	128.963
Full second practice results

=== Final practice ===
The final practice session, sometimes referred to as Happy Hour, was held on Saturday, July 11. Mark Martin, driving for Roush Racing, would set the fastest time in the session, with a lap of 29.761 and an average speed of 127.980 mph (205.964 km/h).

Pos.	#	Driver	Team	Make	Time	Speed
1	6	Mark Martin	Roush Racing	Ford	29.761	127.980
2	98	Rich Bickle	Cale Yarborough Motorsports	Ford	29.782	127.889
3	99	Jeff Burton	Roush Racing	Ford	29.845	127.619
Full Happy Hour practice results

== Qualifying ==
Qualifying was split into two rounds. The first round was held on Friday, July 10, at 3:00 PM EST. Each driver would have one lap to set a time. During the first round, the top 25 drivers in the round would be guaranteed a starting spot in the race. If a driver was not able to guarantee a spot in the first round, they had the option to scrub their time from the first round and try and run a faster lap time in a second round qualifying run, held on Saturday, July 11, at 10:00 AM EST. As with the first round, each driver would have one lap to set a time. On January 24, 1998, NASCAR would announce that the amount of provisionals given would be increased from last season. Positions 26-36 would be decided on time, while positions 37-43 would be based on provisionals. Six spots are awarded by the use of provisionals based on owner's points. The seventh is awarded to a past champion who has not otherwise qualified for the race. If no past champion needs the provisional, the next team in the owner points will be awarded a provisional.

Ricky Craven, driving for Hendrick Motorsports, would win the pole, setting a time of 29.665 and an average speed of 128.394 miles per hour (206.630 km/h).

Dave Marcis was the only driver to fail to qualify.

=== Full qualifying results ===
Pos.	#	Driver	Team	Make	Time	Speed
1	50	Ricky Craven	Hendrick Motorsports	Chevrolet	29.665	128.394
2	24	Jeff Gordon	Hendrick Motorsports	Chevrolet	29.786	127.872
3	88	Dale Jarrett	Robert Yates Racing	Ford	30.001	126.956
4	97	Chad Little	Roush Racing	Ford	30.128	126.421
5	99	Jeff Burton	Roush Racing	Ford	30.139	126.374
6	44	Kyle Petty	Petty Enterprises	Pontiac	30.212	126.069
7	36	Ernie Irvan	MB2 Motorsports	Pontiac	30.215	126.057
8	1	Darrell Waltrip	Dale Earnhardt, Inc.	Chevrolet	30.219	126.040
9	2	Rusty Wallace	Penske-Kranefuss Racing	Ford	30.249	125.915
10	18	Bobby Labonte	Joe Gibbs Racing	Pontiac	30.266	125.844
11	35	Gary Bradberry	ISM Racing	Pontiac	30.277	125.798
12	31	Mike Skinner	Richard Childress Racing	Chevrolet	30.285	125.765
13	94	Bill Elliott	Elliott-Marino Racing	Ford	30.288	125.753
14	90	Dick Trickle	Donlavey Racing	Ford	30.289	125.749
15	6	Mark Martin	Roush Racing	Ford	30.311	125.657
16	43	John Andretti	Petty Enterprises	Pontiac	30.348	125.504
17	81	Kenny Wallace	FILMAR Racing	Ford	30.404	125.273
18	75	Rick Mast	Butch Mock Motorsports	Ford	30.405	125.269
19	11	Brett Bodine	Brett Bodine Racing	Ford	30.407	125.261
20	3	Dale Earnhardt	Richard Childress Racing	Chevrolet	30.414	125.232
21	42	Joe Nemechek	Team SABCO	Chevrolet	30.414	125.232
22	13	Jerry Nadeau (R)	Elliott-Marino Racing	Ford	30.415	125.228
23	23	Jimmy Spencer	Travis Carter Enterprises	Ford	30.461	125.039
24	96	Hut Stricklin	American Equipment Racing	Chevrolet	30.529	124.760
25	28	Kenny Irwin Jr. (R)	Robert Yates Racing	Ford	30.547	124.687
26	33	Ken Schrader	Andy Petree Racing	Chevrolet	29.768	127.949
27	16	Ted Musgrave	Roush Racing	Ford	29.866	127.530
28	46	Jeff Green	Team SABCO	Chevrolet	29.951	127.168
29	30	Derrike Cope	Bahari Racing	Pontiac	29.975	127.066
30	12	Jeremy Mayfield	Penske-Kranefuss Racing	Ford	29.978	127.053
31	98	Rich Bickle	Cale Yarborough Motorsports	Ford	29.998	126.968
32	5	Terry Labonte	Hendrick Motorsports	Chevrolet	30.070	126.664
33	10	Ricky Rudd	Rudd Performance Motorsports	Ford	30.091	126.576
34	22	Ward Burton	Bill Davis Racing	Pontiac	30.096	126.555
35	40	Sterling Marlin	Team SABCO	Chevrolet	30.147	126.341
36	9	Lake Speed	Melling Racing	Ford	30.158	126.295
Provisionals
37	4	Bobby Hamilton	Morgan–McClure Motorsports	Chevrolet	-*	-*
38	21	Michael Waltrip	Wood Brothers Racing	Ford	-*	-*
39	26	Johnny Benson Jr.	Roush Racing	Ford	-*	-*
40	41	Steve Grissom	Larry Hedrick Motorsports	Chevrolet	-*	-*
41	77	Robert Pressley	Jasper Motorsports	Ford	-*	-*
42	7	Geoff Bodine	Mattei Motorsports	Ford	-*	-*
43	91	Morgan Shepherd	LJ Racing	Chevrolet	-*	-*
Failed to qualify
44	71	Dave Marcis	Marcis Auto Racing	Chevrolet	30.462	125.034
Official qualifying results

*Time not available.

== Race results ==
Fin	St	#	Driver	Team	Make	Laps	Led	Status	Pts	Winnings
1	5	99	Jeff Burton	Roush Racing	Ford	300	191	running	185	$131,075
2	15	6	Mark Martin	Roush Racing	Ford	300	0	running	170	$82,575
3	2	24	Jeff Gordon	Hendrick Motorsports	Chevrolet	300	73	running	170	$116,025
4	9	2	Rusty Wallace	Penske-Kranefuss Racing	Ford	300	0	running	160	$59,725
5	12	31	Mike Skinner	Richard Childress Racing	Chevrolet	300	2	running	160	$56,025
6	16	43	John Andretti	Petty Enterprises	Pontiac	300	0	running	150	$60,875
7	3	88	Dale Jarrett	Robert Yates Racing	Ford	300	0	running	146	$55,825
8	6	44	Kyle Petty	Petty Enterprises	Pontiac	300	0	running	142	$47,775
9	26	33	Ken Schrader	Andy Petree Racing	Chevrolet	300	0	running	138	$52,575
10	17	81	Kenny Wallace	FILMAR Racing	Ford	300	0	running	134	$62,625
11	10	18	Bobby Labonte	Joe Gibbs Racing	Pontiac	300	2	running	135	$49,325
12	28	46	Jeff Green	Team SABCO	Chevrolet	300	0	running	127	$33,325
13	8	1	Darrell Waltrip	Dale Earnhardt, Inc.	Chevrolet	300	0	running	124	$37,425
14	32	5	Terry Labonte	Hendrick Motorsports	Chevrolet	299	0	running	121	$48,925
15	37	4	Bobby Hamilton	Morgan–McClure Motorsports	Chevrolet	299	0	running	118	$49,975
16	29	30	Derrike Cope	Bahari Racing	Pontiac	299	0	running	115	$43,825
17	14	90	Dick Trickle	Donlavey Racing	Ford	299	0	running	112	$43,400
18	20	3	Dale Earnhardt	Richard Childress Racing	Chevrolet	299	0	running	109	$47,150
19	33	10	Ricky Rudd	Rudd Performance Motorsports	Ford	299	0	running	106	$48,400
20	7	36	Ernie Irvan	MB2 Motorsports	Pontiac	298	0	running	103	$45,050
21	39	26	Johnny Benson Jr.	Roush Racing	Ford	298	0	running	100	$43,775
22	4	97	Chad Little	Roush Racing	Ford	298	4	running	102	$35,425
23	34	22	Ward Burton	Bill Davis Racing	Pontiac	298	0	running	94	$41,975
24	38	21	Michael Waltrip	Wood Brothers Racing	Ford	298	0	running	91	$42,325
25	23	23	Jimmy Spencer	Travis Carter Enterprises	Ford	298	4	running	93	$42,475
26	13	94	Bill Elliott	Elliott-Marino Racing	Ford	297	10	running	90	$41,225
27	22	13	Jerry Nadeau (R)	Elliott-Marino Racing	Ford	297	0	running	82	$33,950
28	19	11	Brett Bodine	Brett Bodine Racing	Ford	297	1	running	84	$40,700
29	1	50	Ricky Craven	Hendrick Motorsports	Chevrolet	295	13	running	81	$46,950
30	30	12	Jeremy Mayfield	Penske-Kranefuss Racing	Ford	294	0	crash	73	$40,325
31	43	91	Andy Hillenburg	LJ Racing	Chevrolet	293	0	running	70	$33,200
32	18	75	Rick Mast	Butch Mock Motorsports	Ford	291	0	running	67	$30,075
33	25	28	Kenny Irwin Jr. (R)	Robert Yates Racing	Ford	286	0	running	64	$44,950
34	41	77	Robert Pressley	Jasper Motorsports	Ford	280	0	running	61	$29,825
35	35	40	Sterling Marlin	Team SABCO	Chevrolet	261	0	running	58	$29,700
36	21	42	Joe Nemechek	Team SABCO	Chevrolet	249	0	running	55	$36,575
37	42	7	Geoff Bodine	Mattei Motorsports	Ford	184	0	handling	52	$36,450
38	31	98	Rich Bickle	Cale Yarborough Motorsports	Ford	137	0	crash	49	$38,700
39	27	16	Ted Musgrave	Roush Racing	Ford	127	0	crash	46	$36,200
40	11	35	Gary Bradberry	ISM Racing	Pontiac	118	0	engine	43	$29,200
41	36	9	Lake Speed	Melling Racing	Ford	34	0	crash	40	$29,700
42	24	96	Hut Stricklin	American Equipment Racing	Chevrolet	34	0	crash	37	$29,200
43	40	41	Steve Grissom	Larry Hedrick Motorsports	Chevrolet	34	0	crash	34	$36,200
Official race results

Previous race: 1998 Save Mart/Kragen 350	NASCAR Winston Cup Series; 1998 season	Next race: 1998 Pennsylvania 500
