= 1998 Food City 500 =

Sixth race of the 1998 NASCAR Winston Cup Series

Race details
- Race 6 of 33 in the 1998 NASCAR Winston Cup Series
- The 1998 Food City 500 program cover, with artwork by Sam Bass.
- Date: March 29, 1998
- Official name: 38th Annual Food City 500
- Location: Bristol, Tennessee, Bristol Motor Speedway
- Course: Permanent racing facility
- Course length: 0.533 miles (0.858 km)
- Distance: 500 laps, 266.5 mi (428.89 km)
- Average speed: 82.85 miles per hour (133.33 km/h)

Pole position
Driver	Rusty Wallace	Penske-Kranefuss Racing
- Time: 15.440

Most laps led
Driver	Rusty Wallace	Penske-Kranefuss Racing
- Laps: 220

Winner
No. 24	Jeff Gordon	Hendrick Motorsports

Television in the United States
- Network: ESPN
- Announcers: Bob Jenkins, Ned Jarrett, Benny Parsons

Radio in the United States
- Radio: Performance Racing Network

The 1998 Food City 500 was the sixth stock car race of the 1998 NASCAR Winston Cup Series season and the 38th iteration of the event. The race was held on Sunday, March 29, 1998, in Bristol, Tennessee at Bristol Motor Speedway, a 0.533 miles (0.858 km) permanent oval-shaped racetrack. The race took the scheduled 500 laps to complete. With the help of a fast pit crew, Hendrick Motorsports driver Jeff Gordon would manage to dominate the last 63 laps of the race to take his 31st career NASCAR Winston Cup Series victory and his second victory of the season. To fill out the podium, Hendrick Motorsports driver Terry Labonte and Robert Yates Racing driver Dale Jarrett would finish second and third, respectively.

== Background ==
The layout of Bristol Motor Speedway, the venue where the race was held.

The Bristol Motor Speedway, formerly known as Bristol International Raceway and Bristol Raceway, is a NASCAR short track venue located in Bristol, Tennessee. Constructed in 1960, it held its first NASCAR race on July 30, 1961. Despite its short length, Bristol is among the most popular tracks on the NASCAR schedule because of its distinct features, which include extraordinarily steep banking, an all concrete surface, two pit roads, and stadium-like seating. It has also been named one of the loudest NASCAR tracks.

=== Entry list ===
- (R) denotes rookie driver.

#	Driver	Team	Make
1	Darrell Waltrip	Dale Earnhardt, Inc.	Chevrolet
2	Rusty Wallace	Penske-Kranefuss Racing	Ford
3	Dale Earnhardt	Richard Childress Racing	Chevrolet
4	Bobby Hamilton	Morgan–McClure Motorsports	Chevrolet
5	Terry Labonte	Hendrick Motorsports	Chevrolet
6	Mark Martin	Roush Racing	Ford
7	Geoff Bodine	Mattei Motorsports	Ford
8	Hut Stricklin	Stavola Brothers Racing	Chevrolet
9	Lake Speed	Melling Racing	Ford
10	Ricky Rudd	Rudd Performance Motorsports	Ford
11	Brett Bodine	Brett Bodine Racing	Ford
12	Jeremy Mayfield	Penske-Kranefuss Racing	Ford
13	Jerry Nadeau (R)	Elliott-Marino Racing	Ford
16	Ted Musgrave	Roush Racing	Ford
18	Bobby Labonte	Joe Gibbs Racing	Pontiac
21	Michael Waltrip	Wood Brothers Racing	Ford
22	Ward Burton	Bill Davis Racing	Pontiac
23	Jimmy Spencer	Haas-Carter Motorsports	Ford
24	Jeff Gordon	Hendrick Motorsports	Chevrolet
26	Johnny Benson Jr.	Roush Racing	Ford
28	Kenny Irwin Jr. (R)	Robert Yates Racing	Ford
29	Jeff Green	Diamond Ridge Motorsports	Chevrolet
30	Derrike Cope	Bahari Racing	Pontiac
31	Mike Skinner	Richard Childress Racing	Chevrolet
33	Ken Schrader	Andy Petree Racing	Chevrolet
35	Todd Bodine	ISM Racing	Pontiac
36	Ernie Irvan	MB2 Motorsports	Pontiac
40	Sterling Marlin	Team SABCO	Chevrolet
41	Steve Grissom	Larry Hedrick Motorsports	Chevrolet
42	Joe Nemechek	Team SABCO	Chevrolet
43	John Andretti	Petty Enterprises	Pontiac
44	Kyle Petty	Petty Enterprises	Pontiac
46	Morgan Shepherd	Team SABCO	Chevrolet
50	Randy LaJoie	Hendrick Motorsports	Chevrolet
71	Dave Marcis	Marcis Auto Racing	Chevrolet
75	Rick Mast	Butch Mock Motorsports	Ford
77	Robert Pressley	Jasper Motorsports	Ford
78	Gary Bradberry	Triad Motorsports	Ford
81	Kenny Wallace	FILMAR Racing	Ford
88	Dale Jarrett	Robert Yates Racing	Ford
90	Dick Trickle	Donlavey Racing	Ford
91	Kevin Lepage (R)	LJ Racing	Chevrolet
94	Bill Elliott	Elliott-Marino Racing	Ford
96	David Green	American Equipment Racing	Chevrolet
97	Chad Little	Roush Racing	Ford
98	Greg Sacks	Cale Yarborough Motorsports	Ford
99	Jeff Burton	Roush Racing	Ford

== Practice ==
The only practice session was held on Friday, March 27. Rick Mast, driving for Butch Mock Motorsports, would set the fastest time in the session, with a lap of 15.564 and an average speed of 123.285 mph (198.408 km/h).

Pos.	#	Driver	Team	Make	Time	Speed
1	75	Rick Mast	Butch Mock Motorsports	Ford	15.564	123.285
2	5	Terry Labonte	Hendrick Motorsports	Chevrolet	15.567	123.261
3	36	Ernie Irvan	MB2 Motorsports	Pontiac	15.588	123.095
Full practice results

== Qualifying ==
Qualifying was split into two rounds. The first round was held on Friday, March 27, at 2:00 p.m. EST. Each driver would have one lap to set a time. During the first round, the top 25 drivers in the round would be guaranteed a starting spot in the race. If a driver was not able to guarantee a spot in the first round, they had the option to scrub their time from the first round and try and run a faster lap time in a second round qualifying run, held on Saturday, March 28. As with the first round, each driver would have one lap to set a time. On January 24, 1998, NASCAR would announce that the amount of provisionals given would be increased from last season. Positions 26-36 would be decided on time, while positions 37-43 would be based on provisionals. Six spots are awarded by the use of provisionals based on owner's points. The seventh is awarded to a past champion who has not otherwise qualified for the race. If no past champion needs the provisional, the next team in the owner points will be awarded a provisional.

Rusty Wallace, driving for Penske-Kranefuss Racing, would win the pole, setting a time of 15.440 and an average speed of 124.275 miles per hour (200.001 km/h).

Four drivers would fail to qualify: Jeff Green, Joe Nemechek, Gary Bradberry, and Dave Marcis.

=== Full qualifying results ===
Pos.	#	Driver	Team	Make	Time	Speed
1	2	Rusty Wallace	Penske-Kranefuss Racing	Ford	15.440	124.275
2	24	Jeff Gordon	Hendrick Motorsports	Chevrolet	15.504	123.762
3	5	Terry Labonte	Hendrick Motorsports	Chevrolet	15.532	123.539
4	31	Mike Skinner	Richard Childress Racing	Chevrolet	15.535	123.515
5	99	Jeff Burton	Roush Racing	Ford	15.537	123.499
6	88	Dale Jarrett	Robert Yates Racing	Ford	15.550	123.395
7	18	Bobby Labonte	Joe Gibbs Racing	Pontiac	15.559	123.324
8	26	Johnny Benson Jr.	Roush Racing	Ford	15.569	123.245
9	6	Mark Martin	Roush Racing	Ford	15.572	123.221
10	12	Jeremy Mayfield	Penske-Kranefuss Racing	Ford	15.577	123.182
11	98	Greg Sacks	Cale Yarborough Motorsports	Ford	15.580	123.158
12	46	Morgan Shepherd	Team SABCO	Chevrolet	15.586	123.110
13	81	Kenny Wallace	FILMAR Racing	Ford	15.593	123.055
14	33	Ken Schrader	Andy Petree Racing	Chevrolet	15.599	123.008
15	30	Derrike Cope	Bahari Racing	Pontiac	15.599	123.008
16	35	Todd Bodine	ISM Racing	Pontiac	15.600	123.000
17	50	Randy LaJoie	Hendrick Motorsports	Chevrolet	15.603	122.976
18	7	Geoff Bodine	Mattei Motorsports	Ford	15.632	122.748
19	75	Rick Mast	Butch Mock Motorsports	Ford	15.635	122.725
20	11	Brett Bodine	Brett Bodine Racing	Ford	15.642	122.670
21	43	John Andretti	Petty Enterprises	Pontiac	15.644	122.654
22	13	Jerry Nadeau (R)	Elliott-Marino Racing	Ford	15.653	122.584
23	91	Kevin Lepage (R)	LJ Racing	Chevrolet	15.653	122.584
24	40	Sterling Marlin	Team SABCO	Chevrolet	15.655	122.568
25	8	Hut Stricklin	Stavola Brothers Racing	Chevrolet	15.657	122.552
26	23	Jimmy Spencer	Travis Carter Enterprises	Ford	15.661	122.521
27	28	Kenny Irwin Jr. (R)	Robert Yates Racing	Ford	15.671	122.443
28	36	Ernie Irvan	MB2 Motorsports	Pontiac	15.672	122.435
29	16	Ted Musgrave	Roush Racing	Ford	15.675	122.411
30	96	David Green	American Equipment Racing	Chevrolet	15.675	122.411
31	77	Robert Pressley	Jasper Motorsports	Ford	15.678	122.388
32	21	Michael Waltrip	Wood Brothers Racing	Ford	15.694	122.263
33	44	Kyle Petty	Petty Enterprises	Pontiac	15.700	122.217
34	97	Chad Little	Roush Racing	Ford	15.703	122.193
35	10	Ricky Rudd	Rudd Performance Motorsports	Ford	15.706	122.170
36	9	Lake Speed	Melling Racing	Ford	15.711	122.131
Provisionals
37	3	Dale Earnhardt	Richard Childress Racing	Chevrolet	-*	-*
38	94	Bill Elliott	Elliott-Marino Racing	Ford	-*	-*
39	22	Ward Burton	Bill Davis Racing	Pontiac	-*	-*
40	4	Bobby Hamilton	Morgan–McClure Motorsports	Chevrolet	-*	-*
41	90	Dick Trickle	Donlavey Racing	Ford	-*	-*
42	41	Steve Grissom	Larry Hedrick Motorsports	Chevrolet	-*	-*
Champion's Provisional
43	1	Darrell Waltrip	Dale Earnhardt, Inc.	Chevrolet	-*	-*
Failed to qualify
44	29	Jeff Green	Diamond Ridge Motorsports	Chevrolet	15.730	121.983
45	42	Joe Nemechek	Team SABCO	Chevrolet	15.857	121.006
46	78	Gary Bradberry	Triad Motorsports	Ford	15.940	120.376
47	71	Dave Marcis	Marcis Auto Racing	Chevrolet	16.018	119.790
Official qualifying results

*Time not available.

== Race results ==
Fin	St	#	Driver	Team	Make	Laps	Led	Status	Pts	Winnings
1	2	24	Jeff Gordon	Hendrick Motorsports	Chevrolet	500	63	running	180	$90,860
2	3	5	Terry Labonte	Hendrick Motorsports	Chevrolet	500	115	running	175	$57,960
3	6	88	Dale Jarrett	Robert Yates Racing	Ford	500	18	running	170	$57,660
4	5	99	Jeff Burton	Roush Racing	Ford	500	0	running	160	$47,670
5	8	26	Johnny Benson Jr.	Roush Racing	Ford	500	0	running	155	$38,770
6	14	33	Ken Schrader	Andy Petree Racing	Chevrolet	500	5	running	155	$43,270
7	9	6	Mark Martin	Roush Racing	Ford	500	0	running	146	$39,070
8	29	16	Ted Musgrave	Roush Racing	Ford	500	0	running	142	$33,470
9	32	21	Michael Waltrip	Wood Brothers Racing	Ford	500	1	running	143	$35,320
10	17	50	Randy LaJoie	Hendrick Motorsports	Chevrolet	499	0	running	134	$38,165
11	20	11	Brett Bodine	Brett Bodine Racing	Ford	499	0	running	130	$32,295
12	10	12	Jeremy Mayfield	Penske-Kranefuss Racing	Ford	499	0	running	127	$30,940
13	41	90	Dick Trickle	Donlavey Racing	Ford	498	0	running	124	$31,715
14	26	23	Jimmy Spencer	Travis Carter Enterprises	Ford	498	0	running	121	$37,915
15	38	94	Bill Elliott	Elliott-Marino Racing	Ford	498	17	running	123	$31,515
16	42	41	Steve Grissom	Larry Hedrick Motorsports	Chevrolet	498	0	running	115	$30,590
17	39	22	Ward Burton	Bill Davis Racing	Pontiac	498	0	running	112	$29,740
18	40	4	Bobby Hamilton	Morgan–McClure Motorsports	Chevrolet	498	35	running	114	$29,540
19	21	43	John Andretti	Petty Enterprises	Pontiac	497	0	running	106	$34,030
20	28	36	Ernie Irvan	MB2 Motorsports	Pontiac	497	16	running	108	$31,175
21	30	96	David Green	American Equipment Racing	Chevrolet	497	0	running	100	$23,415
22	37	3	Dale Earnhardt	Richard Childress Racing	Chevrolet	496	0	running	97	$33,715
23	43	1	Darrell Waltrip	Dale Earnhardt, Inc.	Chevrolet	496	0	running	94	$18,665
24	12	46	Morgan Shepherd	Team SABCO	Chevrolet	496	0	running	91	$18,590
25	19	75	Rick Mast	Butch Mock Motorsports	Ford	496	0	running	88	$22,245
26	15	30	Derrike Cope	Bahari Racing	Pontiac	495	0	running	85	$28,615
27	23	91	Kevin Lepage (R)	LJ Racing	Chevrolet	491	0	running	82	$19,495
28	31	77	Robert Pressley	Jasper Motorsports	Ford	489	0	crash	79	$18,440
29	16	35	Todd Bodine	ISM Racing	Pontiac	486	0	running	76	$18,410
30	35	10	Ricky Rudd	Rudd Performance Motorsports	Ford	482	0	running	73	$34,485
31	36	9	Lake Speed	Melling Racing	Ford	480	0	transmission	70	$20,315
32	4	31	Mike Skinner	Richard Childress Racing	Chevrolet	460	0	running	67	$17,395
33	1	2	Rusty Wallace	Penske-Kranefuss Racing	Ford	446	220	running	74	$37,275
34	7	18	Bobby Labonte	Joe Gibbs Racing	Pontiac	442	0	crash	61	$32,235
35	34	97	Chad Little	Roush Racing	Ford	442	10	crash	63	$20,215
36	11	98	Greg Sacks	Cale Yarborough Motorsports	Ford	425	0	running	55	$26,695
37	22	13	Jerry Nadeau (R)	Elliott-Marino Racing	Ford	399	0	running	52	$17,185
38	33	44	Kyle Petty	Petty Enterprises	Pontiac	394	0	running	49	$24,175
39	18	7	Geoff Bodine	Mattei Motorsports	Ford	385	0	overheating	46	$24,165
40	24	40	Sterling Marlin	Team SABCO	Chevrolet	324	0	running	43	$17,150
41	25	8	Hut Stricklin	Stavola Brothers Racing	Chevrolet	204	0	handling	40	$17,125
42	13	81	Kenny Wallace	FILMAR Racing	Ford	155	0	crash	37	$17,100
43	27	28	Kenny Irwin Jr. (R)	Robert Yates Racing	Ford	88	0	crash	34	$32,077
Official race results

Previous race: 1998 TranSouth Financial 400	NASCAR Winston Cup Series; 1998 season	Next race: 1998 Texas 500
