= 1998 TranSouth Financial 400 =

Fifth race of the 1998 NASCAR Winston Cup Series

Race details
- Race 5 of 33 in the 1998 NASCAR Winston Cup Series
- The 1998 TranSouth Financial 400 program cover, featuring Dale Earnhardt.
- Date: March 22, 1998
- Official name: 42nd Annual TranSouth Financial 400
- Location: Darlington, South Carolina, Darlington Raceway
- Course: Permanent racing facility
- Course length: 1.366 miles (2.198 km)
- Distance: 293 laps, 400.238 mi (644.12 km)
- Average speed: 127.962 miles per hour (205.935 km/h)

Pole position
| Driver | Mark Martin | Roush Racing |
- Time: 29.156

Most laps led
| Driver | Jeff Burton | Roush Racing |
- Laps: 195

Winner
| No. 88 | Dale Jarrett | Robert Yates Racing |

Television in the United States
- Network: ESPN
- Announcers: Bob Jenkins, Ned Jarrett, Benny Parsons

Radio in the United States
- Radio: Motor Racing Network

The 1998 TranSouth Financial 400 was the fifth stock car race of the 1998 NASCAR Winston Cup Series season and the 42nd iteration of the event. The race was held on Sunday, March 22, 1998, in Darlington, South Carolina, at Darlington Raceway, a 1.366 miles (2.198 km) permanent egg-shaped oval racetrack. The race took the scheduled 293 laps to complete. In the late stages of the race, Robert Yates Racing driver Dale Jarrett would manage to defend Hendrick Motorsports driver Jeff Gordon to take his 16th career NASCAR Winston Cup Series victory and his first victory of the season. To fill out the top 3, Gordon and Penske-Kranefuss Racing driver Rusty Wallace would finish second and third, respectively.

== Background ==
The layout of Darlington Raceway, the venue where the race was held.

Darlington Raceway is a race track built for NASCAR racing located near Darlington, South Carolina. It is nicknamed "The Lady in Black" and "The Track Too Tough to Tame" by many NASCAR fans and drivers and advertised as "A NASCAR Tradition." It is of a unique, somewhat egg-shaped design, an oval with the ends of very different configurations, a condition which supposedly arose from the proximity of one end of the track to a minnow pond the owner refused to relocate. This situation makes it very challenging for the crews to set up their cars' handling in a way that is effective at both ends.

=== Entry list ===
- (R) denotes rookie driver.

| # | Driver | Team | Make |
|---|---|---|---|
| 1 | Ron Hornaday Jr. | Dale Earnhardt, Inc. | Chevrolet |
| 2 | Rusty Wallace | Penske-Kranefuss Racing | Ford |
| 3 | Dale Earnhardt | Richard Childress Racing | Chevrolet |
| 4 | Bobby Hamilton | Morgan–McClure Motorsports | Chevrolet |
| 5 | Terry Labonte | Hendrick Motorsports | Chevrolet |
| 05 | Morgan Shepherd | Shepherd Racing Ventures | Pontiac |
| 6 | Mark Martin | Roush Racing | Ford |
| 7 | Geoff Bodine | Mattei Motorsports | Ford |
| 8 | Hut Stricklin | Stavola Brothers Racing | Chevrolet |
| 9 | Lake Speed | Melling Racing | Ford |
| 10 | Ricky Rudd | Rudd Performance Motorsports | Ford |
| 11 | Brett Bodine | Brett Bodine Racing | Ford |
| 12 | Jeremy Mayfield | Penske-Kranefuss Racing | Ford |
| 13 | Jerry Nadeau (R) | Elliott-Marino Racing | Ford |
| 16 | Ted Musgrave | Roush Racing | Ford |
| 18 | Bobby Labonte | Joe Gibbs Racing | Pontiac |
| 21 | Michael Waltrip | Wood Brothers Racing | Ford |
| 22 | Ward Burton | Bill Davis Racing | Pontiac |
| 23 | Jimmy Spencer | Haas-Carter Motorsports | Ford |
| 24 | Jeff Gordon | Hendrick Motorsports | Chevrolet |
| 26 | Johnny Benson Jr. | Roush Racing | Ford |
| 28 | Kenny Irwin Jr. (R) | Robert Yates Racing | Ford |
| 29 | Jeff Green | Diamond Ridge Motorsports | Chevrolet |
| 30 | Derrike Cope | Bahari Racing | Pontiac |
| 31 | Mike Skinner | Richard Childress Racing | Chevrolet |
| 33 | Ken Schrader | Andy Petree Racing | Chevrolet |
| 35 | Todd Bodine | ISM Racing | Pontiac |
| 36 | Ernie Irvan | MB2 Motorsports | Pontiac |
| 40 | Sterling Marlin | Team SABCO | Chevrolet |
| 41 | Steve Grissom | Larry Hedrick Motorsports | Chevrolet |
| 42 | Joe Nemechek | Team SABCO | Chevrolet |
| 43 | John Andretti | Petty Enterprises | Pontiac |
| 44 | Kyle Petty | Petty Enterprises | Pontiac |
| 46 | Wally Dallenbach Jr. | Team SABCO | Chevrolet |
| 50 | Randy LaJoie | Hendrick Motorsports | Chevrolet |
| 71 | Dave Marcis | Marcis Auto Racing | Chevrolet |
| 75 | Rick Mast | Butch Mock Motorsports | Ford |
| 77 | Robert Pressley | Jasper Motorsports | Ford |
| 78 | Gary Bradberry | Triad Motorsports | Ford |
| 81 | Kenny Wallace | FILMAR Racing | Ford |
| 88 | Dale Jarrett | Robert Yates Racing | Ford |
| 90 | Dick Trickle | Donlavey Racing | Ford |
| 91 | Kevin Lepage (R) | LJ Racing | Chevrolet |
| 94 | Bill Elliott | Elliott-Marino Racing | Ford |
| 96 | David Green | American Equipment Racing | Chevrolet |
| 97 | Chad Little | Roush Racing | Ford |
| 98 | Greg Sacks | Cale Yarborough Motorsports | Ford |
| 99 | Jeff Burton | Roush Racing | Ford |
| 300* | Darrell Waltrip | Darrell Waltrip Motorsports | Chevrolet |

*Changed to 17 after NASCAR did not allow car digits to exceed two digits.

== Practice ==
=== First practice ===
The first practice session was held on the morning of Friday, March 20. Kenny Irwin Jr., driving for Robert Yates Racing, would set the fastest time in the session, with a lap of 29.286 and an average speed of 167.919 mph (270.239 km/h).

| Pos. | # | Driver | Team | Make | Time | Speed |
|---|---|---|---|---|---|---|
| 1 | 28 | Kenny Irwin Jr. (R) | Robert Yates Racing | Ford | 29.286 | 167.919 |
| 2 | 42 | Joe Nemechek | Team SABCO | Chevrolet | 29.436 | 167.061 |
| 3 | 22 | Ward Burton | Bill Davis Racing | Pontiac | 29.539 | 166.478 |
Full first practice results

=== Second practice ===
The second practice session was held on the afternoon of Friday, March 20. Bobby Labonte, driving for Joe Gibbs Racing, would set the fastest time in the session, with a lap of 29.336 and an average speed of 167.630 mph (269.774 km/h).

| Pos. | # | Driver | Team | Make | Time | Speed |
|---|---|---|---|---|---|---|
| 1 | 18 | Bobby Labonte | Joe Gibbs Racing | Pontiac | 29.336 | 167.630 |
| 2 | 12 | Jeremy Mayfield | Penske-Kranefuss Racing | Ford | 29.374 | 167.413 |
| 3 | 96 | David Green | American Equipment Racing | Chevrolet | 29.417 | 167.169 |
Full second practice results

=== Final practice ===
The final practice session, sometimes referred to as Happy Hour, was held on Saturday, March 21. Ted Musgrave, driving for Roush Racing, would set the fastest time in the session, with a lap of 29.758 and an average speed of 165.253 mph (265.949 km/h).

| Pos. | # | Driver | Team | Make | Time | Speed |
|---|---|---|---|---|---|---|
| 1 | 16 | Ted Musgrave | Roush Racing | Ford | 29.758 | 165.253 |
| 2 | 6 | Mark Martin | Roush Racing | Ford | 29.947 | 164.210 |
| 3 | 96 | David Green | American Equipment Racing | Chevrolet | 29.948 | 164.205 |
Full Happy Hour practice results

== Qualifying ==
Qualifying was split into two rounds. The first round was held on Friday, March 20, at 3:30 p.m. EST. Each driver would have one lap to set a time. During the first round, the top 25 drivers in the round would be guaranteed a starting spot in the race. If a driver was not able to guarantee a spot in the first round, they had the option to scrub their time from the first round and try and run a faster lap time in a second round qualifying run, held on Saturday, March 21, at 11:30 a.m. EST. As with the first round, each driver would have one lap to set a time. On January 24, 1998, NASCAR would announce that the amount of provisionals given would be increased from last season. Positions 26-36 would be decided on time, while positions 37-43 would be based on provisionals. Six spots are awarded by the use of provisionals based on owner's points. The seventh is awarded to a past champion who has not otherwise qualified for the race. If no past champion needs the provisional, the next team in the owner points will be awarded a provisional.

Mark Martin, driving for Roush Racing, would win the pole, setting a time of 29.156 and an average speed of 168.665 miles per hour (271.440 km/h).

Six drivers would fail to qualify: Wally Dallenbach Jr., Dave Marcis, Hut Stricklin, Gary Bradberry, Morgan Shepherd, and Ron Hornaday Jr.

=== Full qualifying results ===
| Pos. | # | Driver | Team | Make | Time | Speed |
|---|---|---|---|---|---|---|
| 1 | 6 | Mark Martin | Roush Racing | Ford | 29.156 | 168.665 |
| 2 | 99 | Jeff Burton | Roush Racing | Ford | 29.222 | 168.284 |
| 3 | 88 | Dale Jarrett | Robert Yates Racing | Ford | 29.239 | 168.186 |
| 4 | 90 | Dick Trickle | Donlavey Racing | Ford | 29.243 | 168.163 |
| 5 | 28 | Kenny Irwin Jr. (R) | Robert Yates Racing | Ford | 29.247 | 168.140 |
| 6 | 18 | Bobby Labonte | Joe Gibbs Racing | Pontiac | 29.249 | 168.129 |
| 7 | 21 | Michael Waltrip | Wood Brothers Racing | Ford | 29.249 | 168.129 |
| 8 | 40 | Sterling Marlin | Team SABCO | Chevrolet | 29.259 | 168.071 |
| 9 | 22 | Ward Burton | Bill Davis Racing | Pontiac | 29.297 | 167.853 |
| 10 | 91 | Kevin Lepage (R) | LJ Racing | Chevrolet | 29.322 | 167.710 |
| 11 | 7 | Geoff Bodine | Mattei Motorsports | Ford | 29.329 | 167.670 |
| 12 | 98 | Greg Sacks | Cale Yarborough Motorsports | Ford | 29.360 | 167.493 |
| 13 | 96 | David Green | American Equipment Racing | Chevrolet | 29.380 | 167.379 |
| 14 | 2 | Rusty Wallace | Penske-Kranefuss Racing | Ford | 29.383 | 167.362 |
| 15 | 75 | Rick Mast | Butch Mock Motorsports | Ford | 29.394 | 167.299 |
| 16 | 43 | John Andretti | Petty Enterprises | Pontiac | 29.396 | 167.288 |
| 17 | 77 | Robert Pressley | Jasper Motorsports | Ford | 29.409 | 167.214 |
| 18 | 10 | Ricky Rudd | Rudd Performance Motorsports | Ford | 29.410 | 167.208 |
| 19 | 31 | Mike Skinner | Richard Childress Racing | Chevrolet | 29.423 | 167.135 |
| 20 | 16 | Ted Musgrave | Roush Racing | Ford | 29.426 | 167.118 |
| 21 | 26 | Johnny Benson Jr. | Roush Racing | Ford | 29.450 | 166.981 |
| 22 | 11 | Brett Bodine | Brett Bodine Racing | Ford | 29.456 | 166.947 |
| 23 | 50 | Randy LaJoie | Hendrick Motorsports | Chevrolet | 29.480 | 166.811 |
| 24 | 24 | Jeff Gordon | Hendrick Motorsports | Chevrolet | 29.493 | 166.738 |
| 25 | 13 | Jerry Nadeau (R) | Elliott-Marino Racing | Ford | 29.502 | 166.687 |
| 26 | 81 | Kenny Wallace | FILMAR Racing | Ford | 29.219 | 168.301 |
| 27 | 3 | Dale Earnhardt | Richard Childress Racing | Chevrolet | 29.406 | 167.231 |
| 28 | 42 | Joe Nemechek | Team SABCO | Chevrolet | 29.424 | 167.129 |
| 29 | 97 | Chad Little | Roush Racing | Ford | 29.459 | 166.930 |
| 30 | 94 | Bill Elliott | Elliott-Marino Racing | Ford | 29.502 | 166.687 |
| 31 | 30 | Derrike Cope | Bahari Racing | Pontiac | 29.504 | 166.676 |
| 32 | 33 | Ken Schrader | Andy Petree Racing | Chevrolet | 29.505 | 166.670 |
| 33 | 5 | Terry Labonte | Hendrick Motorsports | Chevrolet | 29.508 | 166.653 |
| 34 | 9 | Lake Speed | Melling Racing | Ford | 29.509 | 166.647 |
| 35 | 23 | Jimmy Spencer | Travis Carter Enterprises | Ford | 29.514 | 166.619 |
| 36 | 41 | Steve Grissom | Larry Hedrick Motorsports | Chevrolet | 29.577 | 166.264 |
Provisionals
| 37 | 12 | Jeremy Mayfield | Penske-Kranefuss Racing | Ford | -* | -* |
| 38 | 4 | Bobby Hamilton | Morgan–McClure Motorsports | Chevrolet | -* | -* |
| 39 | 36 | Ernie Irvan | MB2 Motorsports | Pontiac | -* | -* |
| 40 | 44 | Kyle Petty | Petty Enterprises | Pontiac | -* | -* |
| 41 | 35 | Todd Bodine | ISM Racing | Pontiac | -* | -* |
| 42 | 29 | Jeff Green | Diamond Ridge Motorsports | Chevrolet | -* | -* |
Champion's Provisional
| 43 | 17 | Darrell Waltrip | Darrell Waltrip Motorsports | Chevrolet | -* | -* |
Failed to qualify
| 44 | 46 | Wally Dallenbach Jr. | Team SABCO | Chevrolet | -* | -* |
| 45 | 71 | Dave Marcis | Marcis Auto Racing | Chevrolet | -* | -* |
| 46 | 8 | Hut Stricklin | Stavola Brothers Racing | Chevrolet | -* | -* |
| 47 | 78 | Gary Bradberry | Triad Motorsports | Ford | -* | -* |
| 48 | 05 | Morgan Shepherd | Shepherd Racing Ventures | Pontiac | -* | -* |
| 49 | 1 | Ron Hornaday Jr. | Dale Earnhardt, Inc. | Chevrolet | -* | -* |
Official qualifying results

== Race results ==
| Fin | St | # | Driver | Team | Make | Laps | Led | Status | Pts | Winnings |
|---|---|---|---|---|---|---|---|---|---|---|
| 1 | 3 | 88 | Dale Jarrett | Robert Yates Racing | Ford | 293 | 68 | running | 180 | $110,035 |
| 2 | 24 | 24 | Jeff Gordon | Hendrick Motorsports | Chevrolet | 293 | 0 | running | 170 | $75,075 |
| 3 | 14 | 2 | Rusty Wallace | Penske-Kranefuss Racing | Ford | 293 | 1 | running | 170 | $52,240 |
| 4 | 37 | 12 | Jeremy Mayfield | Penske-Kranefuss Racing | Ford | 293 | 25 | running | 165 | $45,930 |
| 5 | 2 | 99 | Jeff Burton | Roush Racing | Ford | 293 | 195 | running | 165 | $49,075 |
| 6 | 33 | 5 | Terry Labonte | Hendrick Motorsports | Chevrolet | 293 | 0 | running | 150 | $48,600 |
| 7 | 1 | 6 | Mark Martin | Roush Racing | Ford | 293 | 3 | running | 151 | $47,995 |
| 8 | 21 | 26 | Johnny Benson Jr. | Roush Racing | Ford | 293 | 0 | running | 142 | $26,340 |
| 9 | 26 | 81 | Kenny Wallace | FILMAR Racing | Ford | 293 | 0 | running | 138 | $33,285 |
| 10 | 20 | 16 | Ted Musgrave | Roush Racing | Ford | 292 | 0 | running | 134 | $39,930 |
| 11 | 9 | 22 | Ward Burton | Bill Davis Racing | Pontiac | 292 | 0 | running | 130 | $33,500 |
| 12 | 27 | 3 | Dale Earnhardt | Richard Childress Racing | Chevrolet | 292 | 0 | running | 127 | $37,595 |
| 13 | 16 | 43 | John Andretti | Petty Enterprises | Pontiac | 292 | 0 | running | 124 | $37,990 |
| 14 | 8 | 40 | Sterling Marlin | Team SABCO | Chevrolet | 291 | 0 | running | 121 | $24,560 |
| 15 | 30 | 94 | Bill Elliott | Elliott-Marino Racing | Ford | 291 | 1 | running | 123 | $32,430 |
| 16 | 7 | 21 | Michael Waltrip | Wood Brothers Racing | Ford | 291 | 0 | running | 115 | $32,435 |
| 17 | 29 | 97 | Chad Little | Roush Racing | Ford | 291 | 0 | running | 112 | $23,690 |
| 18 | 32 | 33 | Ken Schrader | Andy Petree Racing | Chevrolet | 291 | 0 | running | 109 | $32,820 |
| 19 | 36 | 41 | Steve Grissom | Larry Hedrick Motorsports | Chevrolet | 291 | 0 | running | 106 | $29,740 |
| 20 | 17 | 77 | Robert Pressley | Jasper Motorsports | Ford | 291 | 0 | running | 103 | $20,970 |
| 21 | 35 | 23 | Jimmy Spencer | Travis Carter Enterprises | Ford | 290 | 0 | running | 100 | $31,405 |
| 22 | 22 | 11 | Brett Bodine | Brett Bodine Racing | Ford | 290 | 0 | running | 97 | $28,840 |
| 23 | 6 | 18 | Bobby Labonte | Joe Gibbs Racing | Pontiac | 290 | 0 | running | 94 | $33,425 |
| 24 | 4 | 90 | Dick Trickle | Donlavey Racing | Ford | 290 | 0 | running | 91 | $28,310 |
| 25 | 34 | 9 | Lake Speed | Melling Racing | Ford | 290 | 0 | running | 88 | $20,995 |
| 26 | 13 | 96 | David Green | American Equipment Racing | Chevrolet | 290 | 0 | running | 85 | $20,685 |
| 27 | 41 | 35 | Todd Bodine | ISM Racing | Pontiac | 290 | 0 | running | 82 | $17,300 |
| 28 | 19 | 31 | Mike Skinner | Richard Childress Racing | Chevrolet | 289 | 0 | running | 79 | $20,245 |
| 29 | 40 | 44 | Kyle Petty | Petty Enterprises | Pontiac | 288 | 0 | running | 76 | $26,940 |
| 30 | 43 | 17 | Darrell Waltrip | Darrell Waltrip Motorsports | Chevrolet | 288 | 0 | running | 73 | $26,810 |
| 31 | 25 | 13 | Jerry Nadeau (R) | Elliott-Marino Racing | Ford | 288 | 0 | running | 70 | $17,655 |
| 32 | 42 | 29 | Jeff Green | Diamond Ridge Motorsports | Chevrolet | 288 | 0 | running | 67 | $20,025 |
| 33 | 18 | 10 | Ricky Rudd | Rudd Performance Motorsports | Ford | 288 | 0 | running | 64 | $32,745 |
| 34 | 10 | 91 | Kevin Lepage (R) | LJ Racing | Chevrolet | 287 | 0 | running | 61 | $16,215 |
| 35 | 38 | 4 | Bobby Hamilton | Morgan–McClure Motorsports | Chevrolet | 286 | 0 | running | 58 | $23,085 |
| 36 | 39 | 36 | Ernie Irvan | MB2 Motorsports | Pontiac | 285 | 0 | running | 55 | $22,955 |
| 37 | 28 | 42 | Joe Nemechek | Team SABCO | Chevrolet | 285 | 0 | running | 52 | $22,875 |
| 38 | 23 | 50 | Randy LaJoie | Hendrick Motorsports | Chevrolet | 284 | 0 | running | 49 | $25,225 |
| 39 | 5 | 28 | Kenny Irwin Jr. (R) | Robert Yates Racing | Ford | 270 | 0 | running | 46 | $30,600 |
| 40 | 31 | 30 | Derrike Cope | Bahari Racing | Pontiac | 231 | 0 | engine | 43 | $22,475 |
| 41 | 11 | 7 | Geoff Bodine | Mattei Motorsports | Ford | 144 | 0 | crash | 40 | $22,350 |
| 42 | 12 | 98 | Greg Sacks | Cale Yarborough Motorsports | Ford | 142 | 0 | crash | 37 | $22,225 |
| 43 | 15 | 75 | Rick Mast | Butch Mock Motorsports | Ford | 26 | 0 | engine | 34 | $15,116 |
Failed to qualify

| Previous race: 1998 Primestar 500 | NASCAR Winston Cup Series; 1998 season | Next race: 1998 Food City 500 |
