= Bradbury =

Bradbury may refer to:

== People ==
- Bradbury (surname)
- Baron Bradbury, a title in the Peerage of the United Kingdom, including three barons with the surname Bradbury.
- Dan Bradbury, English professional golfer
- Robert Elwyn Bradbury (1929–1969), British social anthropologist

== Places ==
- Bradbury, County Durham, England
- Bradbury, California, city of the United States of America
- Bradbury Township, Minnesota, United States of America
- Bradbury, New South Wales, a suburb of Sydney, Australia
- Bradbury Landing, Aeolis Palus, Mars

== Other uses ==
- Bradbury Building, Los Angeles, California
- Bradbury Science Museum, at the Los Alamos National Laboratory
- Justice Bradbury (disambiguation)
- Bradbury Motor Cycles, a British motorcycle manufacturer based in Oldham, England
- Bradbury Wilkinson and Company, an English engraver and printer of banknotes, postage stamps and share certificates
