= Bradbeer =

Bradbeer is a surname. Notable people with the surname include:

- Godwin Bradbeer (born 1950), New Zealand-born Australian artist
- Harry Bradbeer, British television director, producer and writer
- James Bradbeer (1880–1937), British golfer

== See also ==
- Bradberry
