= Justice Bradbury =

Justice Bradbury may refer to:

- Joseph Perry Bradbury (1838–1915), associate justice of the Ohio Supreme Court
- Theophilus Bradbury (1739–1803), associate justice of the Massachusetts Supreme Judicial Court
