= 1998 Las Vegas 400 =

Race details
- Race 3 of 33 in the 1998 NASCAR Winston Cup Series
- 1998 Las Vegas 400 logo
- Date: March 1, 1998
- Location: Las Vegas Motor Speedway
- Course: Permanent racing facility
- Course length: 1.5 miles (2.41 km)
- Distance: 267 laps, 400.5 mi (644.54 km)
- Weather: Temperatures reaching up to 60.1 °F (15.6 °C); wind speeds up to 8.9 miles per hour (14.3 km/h)
- Average speed: 146.554 miles per hour (235.856 km/h)

Pole position
Driver	Dale Jarrett	Robert Yates Racing
- Time: 168.224 miles per hour (270.730 km/h)

Most laps led
Driver	Mark Martin	Roush Racing
- Laps: 82

Winner
No. 6	Mark Martin	Roush Racing

Television in the United States
- Network: ABC
- Announcers: Bob Jenkins, Benny Parsons, Bill Weber, Jack Arute and Jerry Punch

Radio in the United States
- Radio: MRN
- Booth announcers: Allen Bestwick and Barney Hall
- Turn announcers: Joe Moore (1 & 2) and Fred Armstrong (3 & 4)

The 1998 Las Vegas 400 was the inaugural running of the NASCAR Winston Cup Series race at Las Vegas Motor Speedway. Mark Martin, driver of the Valvoline Ford, won the race, and also led the most laps with 82. Dale Jarrett of the Quality Care Service/Ford Credit Ford won the pole position, but finished 40th due to an engine problem. A total of 120,000 people attended the race, with the profits from all three NASCAR races totaling $40 million for the local economy.

== Race ==
The command to start the engines was given by boxing announcer Michael Buffer. Jimmy Howell was the Chief Starter per MRN's Allen Bestwick. As of the 2015 NASCAR Sprint Cup Series season, none of the top 16 finishers are currently racing full-time; Jeff Gordon, the lone current full-time driver, finished 17th.

This race has been self-acclaimed by Mark Martin as being his "biggest victory in the Winston Cup Series." Martin's 5 foot 5 inch stature made him shorter than the Vegas showgirls that posed with him after the race. He would collect six more career wins after this race; making him a strong contender for the championship with an all-new NASCAR team. The Ford Taurus would win more than 100 races after this event before it was retired and replaced with a new Ford model, the Fusion.

Jeff Burton had to fight back from a pit road penalty in order to finish the race with a decent position.

== Race results ==
=== Results ===
Pos	Grid	Car	Driver	Team	Make	Laps	Led	Status
1	7	6	Mark Martin	Roush Racing	Ford	267	82	Running
2	15	99	Jeff Burton	Roush Racing	Ford	267	37	Running
3	10	2	Rusty Wallace	Penske-Kranefuss Racing	Ford	267	40	Running
4	16	26	Johnny Benson Jr.	Roush Racing	Ford	267	9	Running
5	32	12	Jeremy Mayfield	Penske-Kranefuss Racing	Ford	267	0	Running
6	23	16	Ted Musgrave	Roush Racing	Ford	267	0	Running
7	29	23	Jimmy Spencer	Travis Carter Enterprises	Ford	267	28	Running
8	26	3	Dale Earnhardt	Richard Childress Racing	Chevrolet	267	1	Running
9	4	94	Bill Elliott	Elliott-Marino Racing	Ford	267	0	Running
10	17	97	Chad Little	Roush Racing	Ford	267	0	Running
11	6	75	Rick Mast	Butch Mock Motorsports	Ford	266	0	Flagged
12	19	10	Ricky Rudd	Rudd Performance Motorsports	Ford	266	0	Flagged
13	2	7	Geoff Bodine	Bodine-Mattei Motorsports	Ford	266	14	Flagged
14	36	21	Michael Waltrip	Wood Brothers Racing	Ford	266	0	Flagged
15	28	5	Terry Labonte	Hendrick Motorsports	Chevrolet	266	2	Flagged
16	12	90	Dick Trickle	Donlavey Racing	Ford	266	0	Flagged
17	5	24	Jeff Gordon	Hendrick Motorsports	Chevrolet	266	0	Flagged
18	3	22	Ward Burton	Bill Davis Racing	Pontiac	266	5	Flagged
19	11	18	Bobby Labonte	Joe Gibbs Racing	Pontiac	266	0	Flagged
20	41	4	Bobby Hamilton	Morgan–McClure Motorsports	Chevrolet	265	0	Flagged
21	37	33	Ken Schrader	Andy Petree Racing	Chevrolet	265	0	Flagged
22	14	44	Kyle Petty	PE2 Motorsports	Pontiac	265	0	Flagged
23	20	77	Robert Pressley	Jasper Motorsports	Ford	265	0	Flagged
24	21	40	Sterling Marlin	SABCO Racing	Chevrolet	265	0	Flagged
25	22	98	Greg Sacks	Cale Yarborough Motorsports	Ford	265	0	Flagged
26	24	11	Brett Bodine	Scandia Bodine Motorsports	Ford	265	0	Flagged
27	39	50	Ricky Craven	Hendrick Motorsports	Chevrolet	265	0	Flagged
28	35	91	Kevin Lepage (R)	LJ Racing	Chevrolet	264	0	Flagged
29	34	31	Mike Skinner	Richard Childress Racing	Chevrolet	264	0	Flagged
30	18	36	Ernie Irvan	MB2 Motorsports	Pontiac	264	0	Flagged
31	9	30	Derrike Cope	Bahari Racing	Pontiac	264	0	Flagged
32	43	9	Lake Speed	Melling Racing	Ford	264	0	Flagged
33	31	29	Jeff Green	Diamond Ridge Motorsports	Chevrolet	264	0	Flagged
34	33	96	David Green	American Equipment Racing	Chevrolet	264	0	Flagged
35	27	17	Darrell Waltrip	Darrell Waltrip Motorsports	Chevrolet	264	0	Flagged
36	38	28	Kenny Irwin Jr. (R)	Robert Yates Racing	Ford	263	0	Flagged
37	8	42	Joe Nemechek	SABCO Racing	Chevrolet	263	0	Flagged
38	25	46	Wally Dallenbach Jr.	SABCO Racing	Chevrolet	262	0	Flagged
39	40	41	Steve Grissom	Larry Hedrick Motorsports	Chevrolet	258	0	Flagged
40	1	88	Dale Jarrett	Robert Yates Racing	Ford	219	40	Engine
41	30	43	John Andretti	Petty Enterprises	Pontiac	196	0	Piston
42	13	81	Kenny Wallace	FILMAR Racing	Ford	179	0	Engine
43	42	8	Hut Stricklin	Stavola Brothers Racing	Chevrolet	150	0	Electrical
Failed to Qualify
		19	Tony Raines	Roehig Motorsports	Ford			
		78	Gary Bradberry	TRIAD Motorsports	Ford			
		13	Jerry Nadeau (R)	Elliott-Marino Racing	Ford			
		35	Todd Bodine	ISM Racing	Pontiac			
		1	Steve Park (R)	Dale Earnhardt, Inc.	Chevrolet			
		71	Dave Marcis	Marcis Auto Racing	Chevrolet			
		37	Larry Gunselman	Gunselman Motorsports	Ford			
		38	Butch Gilliland	Hilton Racing	Ford			

== Media ==
=== Television ===
The race was aired live on ABC in the United States. Bob Jenkins and 1973 Cup Series champion Benny Parsons called the race from the broadcast booth. Jerry Punch, Bill Weber and Jack Arute handled pit road for the television side.

ABC
Booth announcers		Pit reporters
Lap-by-lap	Color-commentators	Pit reporters
Bob Jenkins	Benny Parsons	Jerry Punch; Bill Weber; Jack Arute

== Standings after the race ==
Pos	Driver	Points
1	Rusty Wallace	505
2	Dale Earnhardt	449
3	Jeremy Mayfield	446
4	Jimmy Spencer	429
5	Bill Elliott	427
6	Jeff Gordon	412
7	Mark Martin	409
8	Terry Labonte	394
9	Chad Little	380
10	Bobby Hamilton	373
