= 1998 Brickyard 400 =

Race details
- Race 19 of 33 in the 1998 NASCAR Winston Cup Series
- 1998 Brickyard 400 program cover
- Date: August 1, 1998
- Official name: Brickyard 400
- Location: Indianapolis Motor Speedway in Speedway, Indiana
- Course: Permanent racing facility
- Course length: 2.5 miles (4.023 km)
- Distance: 160 laps, 400 mi (643.738 km)
- Average speed: 126.772 miles per hour (204.020 km/h)

Pole position
| Driver | Ernie Irvan | MB2 Motorsports |
- Time: 50.169

Most laps led
| Driver | Jeff Gordon | Hendrick Motorsports |
- Laps: 97

Winner
| No. 24 | Jeff Gordon | Hendrick Motorsports |

Television in the United States
- Network: ABC
- Announcers: Bob Jenkins and Benny Parsons
- Nielsen ratings: 4.1/14

The 1998 Brickyard 400, the 5th running of the event, was a NASCAR Winston Cup Series race held on August 1, 1998, at Indianapolis Motor Speedway in Speedway, Indiana. Contested over 160 laps on the 2.5-mile (4.0-kilometre) speedway, it was the 19th race of the 1998 NASCAR Winston Cup Series season. Jeff Gordon of Hendrick Motorsports won the race.

== Background ==
The Indianapolis Motor Speedway, located in Speedway, Indiana, (an enclave suburb of Indianapolis) in the United States, is the home of the Indianapolis 500 and the Brickyard 400. It is located on the corner of 16th Street and Georgetown Road, approximately 6 miles (9.7 kilometres) west of Downtown Indianapolis. It is a four-turn rectangular-oval track that is 2.5 miles (4.0 kilometres) long. The track's turns are banked at 9 degrees, while the front stretch, the location of the finish line, has no banking. The back stretch, opposite of the front, also has a zero degree banking. The racetrack has seats for more than 250,000 spectators.

== Summary ==
Jeff Gordon became the first repeat winner, holding off Mark Martin for the win. Dale Jarrett dominated the second 100 miles (160 kilometres) of the race but lost his chance near the halfway point when he ran out of fuel, and coasted back to the pits; he lost four laps but made them up due to numerous cautions. Gordon's victory was the first in the Winston No Bull 5 program.

== Results ==
| Pos | SP | No. | Driver | Car make | Entrant | Laps | Status |
|---|---|---|---|---|---|---|---|
| 1 | 3 | 24 | Jeff Gordon | Chevrolet | Hendrick Motorsports | 160 | Running |
| 2 | 7 | 6 | Mark Martin | Ford | Roush Racing | 160 | Running |
| 3 | 10 | 18 | Bobby Labonte | Pontiac | Joe Gibbs Racing | 160 | Running |
| 4 | 16 | 31 | Mike Skinner | Chevrolet | Richard Childress Racing | 160 | Running |
| 5 | 28 | 3 | Dale Earnhardt | Chevrolet | Richard Childress Racing | 160 | Running |
| 6 | 1 | 36 | Ernie Irvan | Pontiac | MB2 Motorsports | 160 | Running |
| 7 | 9 | 43 | John Andretti | Pontiac | Petty Enterprises | 160 | Running |
| 8 | 14 | 2 | Rusty Wallace | Ford | Penske Racing | 160 | Running |
| 9 | 8 | 5 | Terry Labonte | Chevrolet | Hendrick Motorsports | 160 | Running |
| 10 | 19 | 33 | Ken Schrader | Chevrolet | Andy Petree Racing | 160 | Running |
| 11 | 11 | 40 | Sterling Marlin | Chevrolet | Team SABCO | 160 | Running |
| 12 | 37 | 94 | Bill Elliott | Ford | Bill Elliott Racing | 160 | Running |
| 13 | 43 | 35 | Darrell Waltrip | Chevrolet | Tyler Jet Motorsports | 160 | Running |
| 14 | 33 | 44 | Kyle Petty | Pontiac | PE2 Motorsports | 160 | Running |
| 15 | 36 | 91 | Morgan Shepherd | Chevrolet | LJ Racing | 160 | Running |
| 16 | 2 | 88 | Dale Jarrett | Ford | Robert Yates Racing | 160 | Running |
| 17 | 6 | 50 | Ricky Craven | Chevrolet | Hendrick Motorsports | 160 | Running |
| 18 | 18 | 90 | Dick Trickle | Ford | Donlavey Racing | 160 | Running |
| 19 | 38 | 16 | Ted Musgrave | Ford | Roush Racing | 160 | Running |
| 20 | 24 | 4 | Bobby Hamilton | Chevrolet | Morgan-McClure Motorsports | 160 | Running |
| 21 | 29 | 21 | Michael Waltrip | Ford | Wood Brothers Racing | 160 | Running |
| 22 | 42 | 75 | Rick Mast | Ford | Butch Mock Motorsports | 160 | Running |
| 23 | 26 | 41 | Steve Grissom | Chevrolet | Larry Hedrick Motorsports | 160 | Running |
| 24 | 17 | 42 | Joe Nemechek | Chevrolet | Team SABCO | 160 | Running |
| 25 | 39 | 26 | Johnny Benson Jr. | Ford | Roush Racing | 159 | Running |
| 26 | 41 | 9 | Jerry Nadeau | Ford | Melling Racing | 159 | Running |
| 27 | 15 | 00 | Buckshot Jones | Chevrolet | Stavola Brothers Racing | 158 | Running |
| 28 | 35 | 97 | Chad Little | Ford | Roush Racing | 157 | Crash |
| 29 | 20 | 77 | Robert Pressley | Ford | Jasper Motorsports | 157 | Crash |
| 30 | 5 | 46 | Jeff Green | Chevrolet | Team SABCO | 157 | Crash |
| 31 | 27 | 10 | Ricky Rudd | Ford | Rudd Performance Motorsports | 155 | Crash |
| 32 | 21 | 23 | Jimmy Spencer | Ford | Travis Carter Enterprises | 154 | Crash |
| 33 | 40 | 11 | Brett Bodine | Ford | Brett Bodine Racing | 152 | Running |
| 34 | 30 | 22 | Ward Burton | Pontiac | Bill Davis Racing | 151 | Running |
| 35 | 25 | 1 | Steve Park | Chevrolet | Dale Earnhardt, Inc. | 148 | Crash |
| 36 | 34 | 99 | Jeff Burton | Ford | Roush Racing | 145 | Running |
| 37 | 13 | 7 | Geoff Bodine | Ford | Mattei Motorsports | 124 | Handling |
| 38 | 4 | 28 | Kenny Irwin Jr. | Ford | Robert Yates Racing | 116 | Crash |
| 39 | 31 | 98 | Rich Bickle | Ford | Cale Yarborough Motorsports | 112 | Running |
| 40 | 22 | 13 | Wally Dallenbach Jr. | Ford | Elliott-Marino Racing | 102 | Engine |
| 41 | 32 | 71 | Dave Marcis | Chevrolet | Marcis Auto Racing | 102 | Engine |
| 42 | 12 | 12 | Jeremy Mayfield | Ford | Penske-Kranefuss Racing | 67 | Handling |
| 43 | 23 | 81 | Kenny Wallace | Ford | FILMAR Racing | 65 | Engine |

=== Failed to qualify ===
- Derrike Cope (#30)
- Hut Stricklin (#96)
- Robby Gordon (#19)
- Randy MacDonald (#95)
- Loy Allen Jr. (#15)
- Gary Bradberry (#78)
- Dan Pardus (#07)
- Lance Hooper (#14)
- Bob Schacht (#95)

=== Race statistics ===
- Time of race: 3:09:19
- Average speed: 126.772 miles per hour (204.020 km/h)
- Pole speed: 179.394 miles per hour (288.707 km/h)
- Cautions: 9 for 34 laps
- Margin of victory: under caution
- Lead changes: 10
- Percent of race run under caution: 21.2%
- Average green flag run: 14 laps

Lap leaders
| Laps | Leader |
|---|---|
| 1–18 | Ernie Irvan |
| 19–38 | Jeff Gordon |
| 39–45 | Ernie Irvan |
| 46–53 | Jeff Gordon |
| 54–80 | Dale Jarrett |
| 81 | Mark Martin |
| 82–83 | Terry Labonte |
| 84–118 | Jeff Gordon |
| 119–120 | Robert Pressley |
| 121–126 | Dale Earnhardt |
| 127–160 | Jeff Gordon |

Total laps led
| Laps | Leader |
|---|---|
| 97 | Jeff Gordon |
| 27 | Dale Jarrett |
| 25 | Ernie Irvan |
| 6 | Dale Earnhardt |
| 2 | Terry Labonte |
| 2 | Robert Pressley |
| 1 | Mark Martin |

Cautions: 9 for 34 laps
| Laps | Reason |
|---|---|
| 18–22 | #7 (Geoff Bodine) crash turn 1 |
| 36–40 | #12 (Jeremy Mayfield) crash turn 2 |
| 87–90 | #22 (Ward Burton) stalled turn 3 |
| 95–98 | #00 (Buckshot Jones) and #11 (Brett Bodine) crash turn 4 |
| 104–107 | Oil on track |
| 118–122 | #28 (Kenny Irwin Jr.) spin turn 2 |
| 151–153 | #1 (Steve Park) crash turn 3 |
| 156–157 | #23 (Jimmy Spencer) crash turn 2 |
| 159–160 | #10 (Ricky Rudd), #42 (Joe Nemechek), #46 (Jeff Green), #77 (Robert Pressley), and #97 (Chad Little) crash frontstraight |

== Media ==
=== Television ===
The race was aired live on ABC in the United States. Bob Jenkins and 1973 NASCAR Winston Cup Series champion Benny Parsons called the race from the broadcast booth. Jerry Punch, Bill Weber and Jack Arute handled pit road for the television side.

ABC
| Booth announcers | | Pit reporters |
| Lap-by-lap | Color commentator | Pit reporters |
|---|---|---|
| Bob Jenkins | Benny Parsons | Jerry Punch; Bill Weber; Jack Arute |
