= ISM Racing =

Auto racing team

ISM Racing was a former auto racing team owned by Bob Hancher. The team fielded entries in the Indy Racing League and the NASCAR Winston Cup Series.

== Indy Racing League ==
ISM fielded cars in the IRL from 1997 to 1999. In 1998, Jeff Ward finished 6th in IRL driver points and won the pole at Phoenix in an ISM car and the team fielded three cars in the 1998 Indianapolis 500. However, the team was only able to run part-time in 1999 and shut down in July of that year. The IRL team used G-Force chassis and Oldsmobile engines.

=== ISM IRL drivers ===
- Jim Guthrie (1998)
- Steve Knapp (1998-1999)
- Jeff Ward (1997-1999)

=== Complete IRL IndyCar Series results ===
(key) (Results in bold indicate pole position; results in italics indicate fastest lap)

Year	Chassis	Engine	Drivers	No.	1	2	3	4	5	6	7	8	9	10	11	Pts Pos	Pos
1996–97					NHA	LSV	WDW	PHX	INDY	TXS	PPIR	CLT	NHA	LSV			
1996–97	Dallara IR7	Oldsmobile Aurora V8	(United States) Jeff Ward **(R)**^{1}	35										17		30th	**69**
1998					WDW	PHX	INDY	TXS	NHA	DOV	CLT	PPIR	ATL	TXS	LSV		
1998	G-Force GF01B	Oldsmobile Aurora V8	(United States) Jeff Ward	35	2	**5**	13	17	22	19	2	20*	6	3	21	6th	**252**
1998	G-Force GF01B	Oldsmobile Aurora V8	(United States) Jim Guthrie	53	DNS	DNS	29									33rd	**41**
1998	G-Force GF01B	Oldsmobile Aurora V8	(United States) Steve Knapp **(R)**	55			3									22nd	**118**
1999					WDW	PHX	CLT	INDY	TXS	PPIR	ATL	DOV	PPIR	LSV	TXS		
1999	G-Force GF01C	Oldsmobile Aurora V8	(United States) Jeff Ward	35	3											11th	**206**
1999	G-Force GF01C	Oldsmobile Aurora V8	(United States) Steve Knapp	35		25	DNQ	26	12	17	27					25th	**69**
1999	G-Force GF01C	Oldsmobile Aurora V8	(United States) Brian Tyler	36				DNQ								37th	**16**
1999	G-Force GF01C	Oldsmobile Aurora V8	(Italy) Vincenzo Sospiri	36				DNQ								NC	—

1. In conjunction with Sinden Racing Services.

== NASCAR: Team Tabasco ==
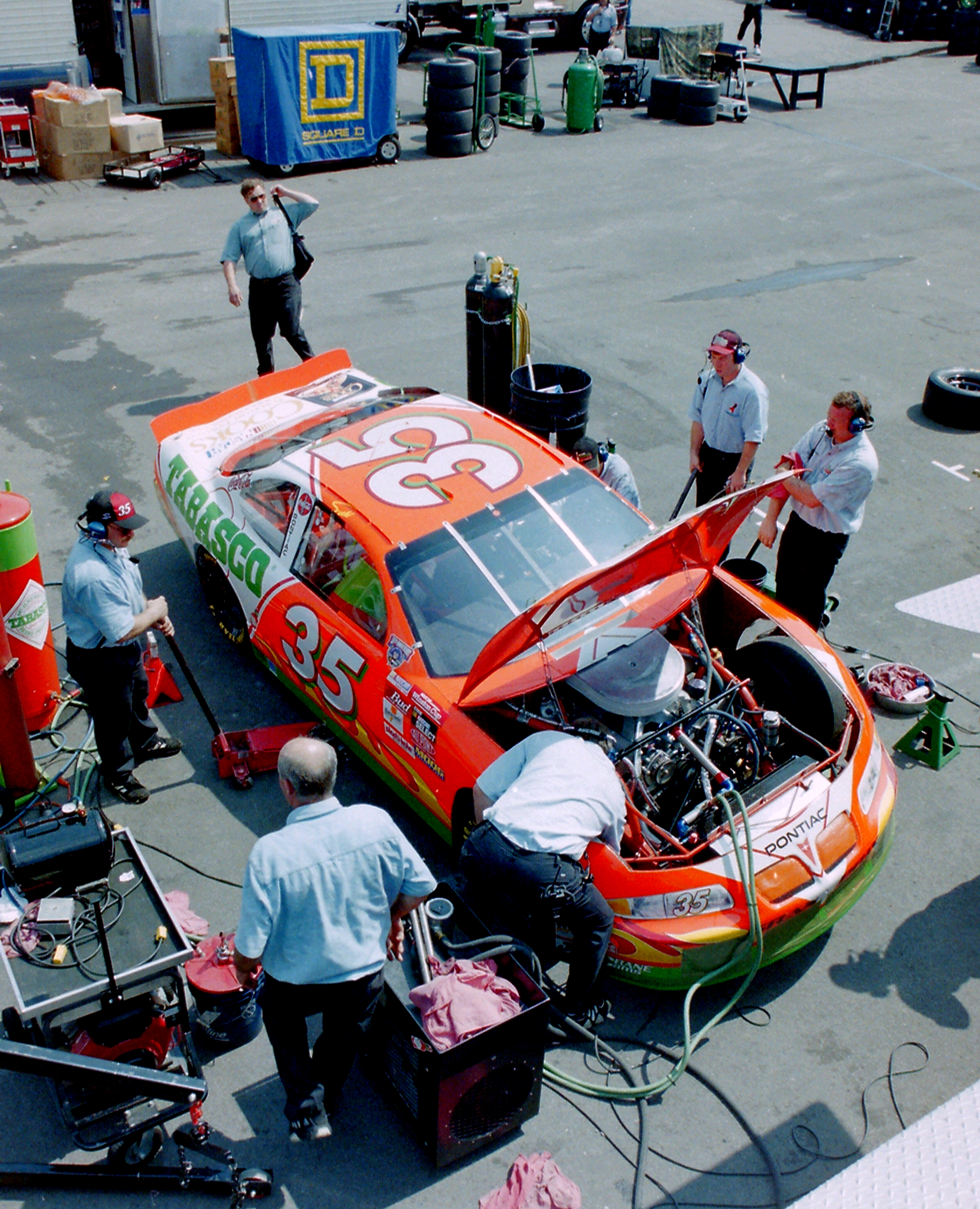
The Tabasco Pontiac

ISM started its NASCAR operation in 1997, starting as a part-time operation with the intent of running the full 1998 Winston Cup season. The team received backing from McIlhenny Company, the makers of Tabasco hot sauce, and hired Todd Bodine, who had last raced full-time in Winston Cup in 1995 for Butch Mock Motorsports, to drive the team's #35 Pontiac. The team attempted the UAW-GM Quality 500 at Charlotte and the season finale at Atlanta, finishing 26th in the former and failing to qualify in the latter.

1998 started off poorly for Bodine as he failed to qualify for the Daytona 500 and the following two races. The team followed this up with an unexpected front row start at Atlanta, and recorded its first top ten when Bodine finished tenth. This would be the only top ten the team would record, and after running 27th at Darlington and 29th at Bristol, the #35 missed the race at Texas. Bodine then ran 39th at Martinsville before missing the race at California Speedway with an injury suffered in a practice crash. Wally Dallenbach, Jr. brought the car home in 29th, after starting 42nd.

Despite the #35's struggles, McIlhenny was not initially upset with the results as they had been largely focused on using their sponsorship as a giant marketing tool. Things began to change when, after he only qualified for five of the first thirteen races of the season, Bodine was released from his contract. After only qualifying for one additional race with Gary Bradberry attempting the July race at New Hampshire, Hancher decided to exit NASCAR and sold the #35 to Tyler Jet Motorsports.

=== Car No. 35 results ===
Year	Team	No.	Make	1	2	3	4	5	6	7	8	9	10	11	12	13	14	15	16	17	18	19	20	21	22	23	24	25	26	27	28	29	30	31	32	33	NWCC	Pts
1997	Todd Bodine	35	Pontiac	DAY	CAR	RCH	ATL	DAR	TEX	BRI	MAR	SON	TAL	CLT	DOV	POC	MCH	CAL	DAY	NHA	POC	IND	GLN	MCH	BRI	DAR	RCH	NHA	DOV	MAR	CLT; 26	TAL	CAR	PHO	ATL; DNQ		52nd	116
1998	Todd Bodine	35	Pontiac	DAY; DNQ	CAR; DNQ	LVS; DNQ	ATL; 10	DAR; 27	BRI; 29	TEX; DNQ	MAR; 39	TAL; DNQ		CLT; 28	DOV; DNQ	RCH; 35	MCH; DNQ	POC; 22	SON; DNQ																		41st	2180
1998	Wally Dallenbach Jr.	35	Pontiac										CAL; 29																								41st	2180
1998	Gary Bradberry	35	Pontiac																	NHA; 40																	41st	2180
1998	Jimmy Horton	35	Pontiac																		POC; DNQ	IND	GLN	MCH	BRI	NHA	DAR	RCH	DOV	MAR	CLT	TAL	DAY	PHO	CAR	ATL	41st	2180
