= Gary Bradberry =

American racing driver (born 1961)

- Born: January 27, 1961 (age 65); Chelsea, Alabama, U.S.
- Awards: 1994 ARCA Hooters Cup Super Car Series Rookie of the Year

NASCAR Cup Series career
- 47 races run over 8 years
- Best finish: 44th (1997)
- First race: 1994 Hooters 500 (Atlanta)
- Last race: 2002 Sirius Satellite Radio 400 (Michigan)
Wins	Top tens	Poles
0	0	0

NASCAR O'Reilly Auto Parts Series career
- 4 races run over 3 years
- Best finish: 76th (1999)
- First race: 1999 Diamond Hill Plywood 200 (Darlington)
- Last race: 1999 NAPA 200 (Michigan)
Wins	Top tens	Poles
0	0	0
- Statistics up to date as of May 3, 2013.

Gary Arnold Bradberry (born January 27, 1961) is an American professional stock car racing driver. He raced in the NASCAR All-Pro Series, and had top-ten points finishes from 1990 to 1993. After that, Bradberry made the jump to major NASCAR leagues. His younger brother was fellow NASCAR driver Charlie Bradberry, who died in an automobile accident in 2006.

== Racing career ==
=== Winston Cup Series ===
Bradberry made his Winston Cup debut at Atlanta Motor Speedway in 1994, starting twelfth and finishing thirtieth in a Ford owned by Jimmy Means.

Bradberry ran four races in 1995, with the first two for his own team. However, he struggled, with a 41st at Michigan and 43rd at Charlotte. Then, for the other two races, Bradberry replaced Ward Burton in the No. 31 Hardee's Chevy, with finishes of 35th and 29th.

Bradberry's next job was at Sadler Brothers Racing, driving the No. 95 Shoney's Chevy in nine 1996 races, with a 23rd place finish at Talladega Superspeedway being his best finish, albeit his best career finish to that point.

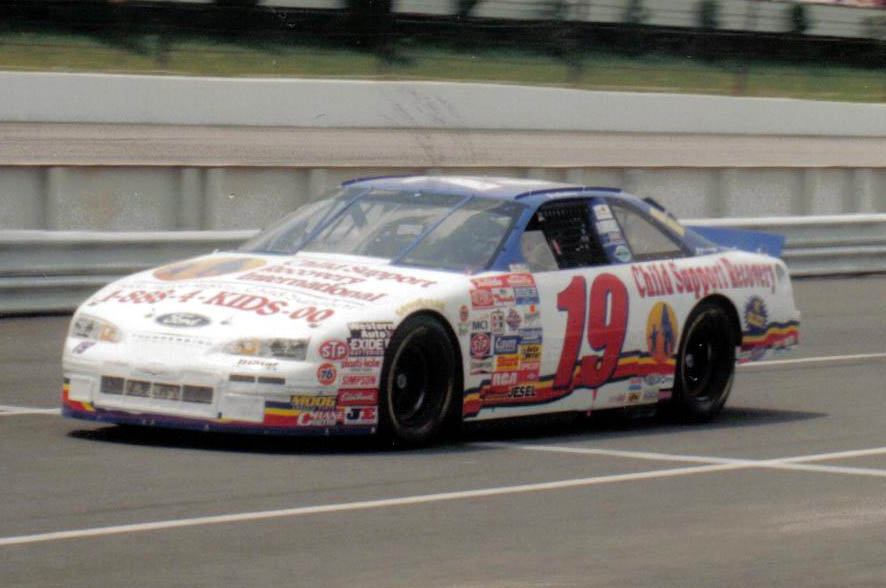
The No. 19 car at Pocono in 1997

Bradberry's largest season was in 1997, when he ran a career-high sixteen races. At first, he was running for Tri-Star Motorsports. However, in eight races, all Bradberry could manage was a 31st at Charlotte, causing him to lose his ride. Bradberry moved to Triad Motorsports and the No. 78 Hanes Ford. His best finish in that ride was a 25th at Darlington being the best run. His 44th in points would prove to be his best career year.

Bradberry began 1998 with backing from Pilot Corporation starting the year. However, Bradberry only qualified for thirteen races and only had two top-25 finishes, his best run a 23rd at California Speedway, matching Bradberry's best career finish. He also qualified eighth at Charlotte, his first career top-ten start. In addition to twelve races for Triad, Bradberry drove the No. 35 Pontiac for ISM Racing at New Hampshire, after Triad chose to skip that race, finishing fortieth. He went on to a 48th-place finish in points.

In 1999, Bradberry's new associate sponsor PHARB Hangover Relief did not fulfil their obligations, and Pilot left soon after, causing the team to close its doors before even running a race. Bradberry's lone start in 1999 was at the season finale for Larry Hedrick Motorsports operation. He started ninth, but engine problems relegated him to 35th.

Bradberry made two more starts for Hedrick in 2000, finishing 41st at Texas and 33rd at Martinsville Speedway, and failing to qualify at Talladega Superspeedway. After those races, Hedrick closed its doors and Bradberry was left without a ride.

Bradberry was unemployed until 2002, when he ran at Michigan with Donlavey Racing, finishing 43rd due to handling problems.

=== Busch Series ===
Bradberry made four races in his Busch career, all coming in 1999. His debut came at Darlington, where he started 23rd and finished 32nd. Bradberry tacked on a 21st at Charlotte (best career start of fifteenth), twentieth at Pikes Peak before having a hard crash at Michigan, finishing 43rd.

=== ARCA SuperCar Series ===
Bradberry was the 1994 ARCA Hooters SuperCar Series Rookie of the Year, and won a race at Flat Rock Speedway that season after his race car and equipment was recovered early on race day from thieves who stole it the night before the race.

== Motorsports career results ==
=== NASCAR ===
(key) (Bold – Pole position awarded by qualifying time. Italics – Pole position earned by points standings or practice time. * – Most laps led.)

==== Winston Cup Series ====
NASCAR Winston Cup Series results
Year	Team	No.	Make	1	2	3	4	5	6	7	8	9	10	11	12	13	14	15	16	17	18	19	20	21	22	23	24	25	26	27	28	29	30	31	32	33	34	35	36	NWCC	Pts	Ref
1994	Jimmy Means Racing	52	Ford	DAY	CAR	RCH	ATL	DAR	BRI	NWS	MAR	TAL	SON	CLT	DOV	POC	MCH	DAY	NHA	POC	TAL	IND	GLN	MCH	BRI	DAR	RCH	DOV	MAR	NWS	CLT	CAR	PHO	ATL; 30						70th	73	
1995	Jimmy Means Racing	52	Ford	DAY; DNQ	CAR; DNQ	RCH; DNQ	ATL; DNQ	DAR	BRI	NWS	MAR	TAL	SON	CLT	DOV	POC																								52nd	208	
1995	Bradberry Racing	88	Chevy														MCH; DNQ	DAY	NHA	POC	TAL	IND	GLN	MCH; 41	BRI	DAR; DNQ	RCH	DOV	MAR	NWS										52nd	208	
1995	Bradberry Racing	93	Chevy																												CLT; 43									52nd	208	
1995	A.G. Dillard Motorsports	31	Chevy																													CAR; 35	PHO	ATL; 29						52nd	208	
1996	Bradberry Racing	93	Chevy	DAY	CAR; DNQ	RCH	ATL	DAR	BRI	NWS	MAR	TAL	SON	CLT																										46th	591	
1996	Sadler Brothers Racing	95	Ford												DOV; 38	POC	MCH	DAY; 35	NHA	POC	TAL; 23	IND; 29	GLN	MCH	BRI; 30	DAR; 35	RCH; DNQ	DOV; 37	MAR; DNQ	NWS; DNQ	CLT; DNQ	CAR; 27	PHO	ATL; 38						46th	591	
1997	Sadler Brothers Racing	95	Chevy	DAY; DNQ	CAR; DNQ																																			44th	868	
1997	TriStar Motorsports	19	Ford			RCH; 38	ATL; 40	DAR; 38	TEX; DNQ	BRI; 37	MAR; DNQ	SON; 43	TAL; DNQ	CLT; 31	DOV; 35	POC; 33	MCH; DNQ	CAL	DAY	NHA	POC	IND	GLN																	44th	868	
1997	Triad Motorsports	78	Ford																					MCH; 37	BRI; 37	DAR; 25	RCH; DNQ	NHA; 34	DOV; 35	MAR; DNQ	CLT; 34	TAL; DNQ	CAR; 41	PHO; DNQ	ATL; 42					44th	868	
1998	Triad Motorsports	78	Ford	DAY; DNQ	CAR; DNQ	LVS; DNQ	ATL; 43	DAR; DNQ	BRI; DNQ	TEX; 24	MAR; DNQ	TAL; DNQ	CAL; 23	CLT; 37	DOV; 34	RCH	MCH; 34	POC	SON		POC; DNQ	IND; DNQ	GLN	MCH; DNQ	BRI; DNQ	NHA	DAR; 37	RCH; DNQ	DOV; 28	MAR; DNQ	CLT; 42	TAL; DNQ	DAY; DNQ	PHO; 41	CAR; 28	ATL; 33				48th	787	
1998	ISM Racing	35	Pontiac																	NHA; 40																				48th	787	
1999	Triad Motorsports	78	Ford	DAY; DNQ	CAR	LVS	ATL	DAR	TEX	BRI	MAR	TAL	CAL	RCH	CLT	DOV	MCH	POC	SON	DAY	NHA	POC																		66th	58	
1999	Hover Motorsports	80	Ford																				IND; DNQ	GLN	MCH	BRI	DAR	RCH	NHA	DOV	MAR	CLT; DNQ	TAL	CAR	PHO	HOM				66th	58	
1999	Larry Hedrick Motorsports	41	Chevy																																		ATL; 35			66th	58	
2000	Larry Hedrick Motorsports	41	Chevy	DAY	CAR	LVS	ATL	DAR	BRI	TEX; 41	MAR; 33	TAL; DNQ	CAL	RCH	CLT	DOV	MCH	POC	SON	DAY	NHA	POC	IND	GLN	MCH	BRI	DAR	RCH	NHA	DOV	MAR	CLT	TAL	CAR	PHO	HOM	ATL			63rd	104	
2002	Donlavey Racing	90	Ford	DAY	CAR	LVS	ATL	DAR	BRI	TEX	MAR	TAL	CAL	RCH	CLT	DOV	POC	MCH; 43	SON	DAY	CHI	NHA	POC	IND	GLN	MCH	BRI	DAR	RCH	NHA	DOV	KAN	TAL	CLT	MAR	ATL	CAR	PHO	HOM	86th	34	

===== Daytona 500 results =====
Year	Team	Manufacturer	Start	Finish
1995	Jimmy Means Racing	Ford	DNQ	
1997	Sadler Brothers Racing	Chevrolet	DNQ	
1998	Triad Motorsports	Ford	DNQ	
1999	Triad Motorsports	Ford	DNQ	

==== Busch Series ====
NASCAR Busch Series results
Year	Team	No.	Make	1	2	3	4	5	6	7	8	9	10	11	12	13	14	15	16	17	18	19	20	21	22	23	24	25	26	27	28	29	30	31	32	NBGNC	Pts	Ref
1998	Marcrum Motorsports	86	Chevy	DAY	CAR	LVS	NSV	DAR	BRI	TEX	HCY	TAL	NHA	NZH	CLT	DOV	RCH	PPR	GLN	MLW	MYB	CAL	SBO	IRP	MCH	BRI	DAR	RCH	DOV	CLT	GTY	CAR	ATL; DNQ	HOM		NA	-	
1999	Marcrum Motorsports	86	Chevy	DAY	CAR	LVS	ATL	DAR; 32	TEX	NSV	BRI; DNQ	TAL	CAL	NHA	RCH	NZH	CLT; 21	DOV	SBO	GLN	MLW	MYB				MCH; 43	BRI	DAR	RCH	DOV	CLT; DNQ	CAR	MEM	PHO	HOM	76th	304	
1999	LAR Motorsports	28	Chevy																				PPR; 20	GTY; DNQ	IRP											76th	304	
2000	Marcrum Motorsports	86	Chevy	DAY	CAR	LVS	ATL; DNQ	DAR	BRI	TEX	NSV	TAL	CAL	RCH	NHA	CLT	DOV	SBO	MYB	GLN	MLW	NZH	PPR	GTY	IRP	MCH	BRI	DAR	RCH	DOV	CLT	CAR	MEM	PHO	HOM	NA	-	

==== Craftsman Truck Series ====
NASCAR Craftsman Truck Series results
Year	Team	No.	Make	1	2	3	4	5	6	7	8	9	10	11	12	13	14	15	16	17	18	19	20	21	22	23	24	NCTC	Pts	Ref
2000	Hover Motorsports	80	Ford	DAY; DNQ	HOM	PHO	MMR	MAR	PIR	GTY	MEM	PPR	EVG	TEX	KEN	GLN	MLW	NHA	NZH	MCH	IRP	NSV	CIC	RCH	DOV	TEX	CAL	N/A	-	

=== ARCA Bondo/Mar-Hyde Series ===
(key) (Bold – Pole position awarded by qualifying time. Italics – Pole position earned by points standings or practice time. * – Most laps led.)

ARCA Bondo/Mar-Hyde Series results
Year	Team	No.	Make	1	2	3	4	5	6	7	8	9	10	11	12	13	14	15	16	17	18	19	20	21	22	23	24	25	ABSC	Pts	Ref
1992	Bradberry Racing	78	Chevy	DAY	FIF	TWS	TAL; 23	TOL	KIL	POC	MCH	FRS	KIL	NSH	DEL	POC	HPT	FRS	ISF	TOL	DSF	TWS	SLM	ATL					114th	-	
1993	Bradberry Racing	78	Chevy	DAY; 38	FIF	TWS	TAL	KIL	CMS	FRS	TOL	POC	MCH	FRS	POC	KIL	ISF	DSF	TOL	SLM	WIN	ATL							102nd	-	
1994	Bradberry Racing	78	Chevy	DAY; 41	TAL; 8						MCH; 2													ATL; 24					3rd	4895	
1994	Bradberry Racing	78	Buick			**FIF**; 1*	LVL; 5	KIL; 9	TOL; 19	FRS; 1		DMS; 5		POC; 14	KIL; 20	FRS; 19		I70; 5	ISF; 25	**DSF**; 26	TOL; 14	**SLM**; 30	**WIN**; 1*						3rd	4895	
1994	Bradberry Racing	78	Pontiac										POC; 23																3rd	4895	
1994	Bradberry Racing	78	Ford														INF; 23												3rd	4895	
1995	Bradberry Racing	78	Chevy	DAY; 2*	ATL; 22	TAL; 11	FIF	KIL	FRS	MCH	I80	MCS	FRS	POC	POC; 30	KIL	FRS	SBS	LVL	ISF	DSF	SLM	WIN						37th	925	
1995	Roulo Brothers Racing	39	Chevy																					ATL; 41					37th	925	
1996			Buick	DAY	ATL	SLM	TAL	FIF; 15	LVL	CLT	CLT	KIL	FRS	POC	MCH	FRS	TOL	POC	MCH	INF	SBS	ISF	DSF	KIL	SLM	WIN	CLT	ATL	128th	-	
1997	Hover Motorsports	80	Ford	DAY; 7	ATL	SLM	CLT	CLT	POC	MCH	SBS	TOL	KIL	FRS	MIN	POC	MCH	DSF	GTW	SLM	WIN	CLT	TAL	ISF	ATL				122nd	-	
