= Winter Heat Series =

Television series

Winter Heat Series (or NASCAR Winter Heat) is a television program on TNN and later ESPN2 that featured stock car racing.

== History ==
The program aired during the winter months between November and January (during NASCAR's offseason). The program began during the 1994–1995 winter and ran through the 1998–1999 winter. The races were held at the 3/8 mile Tucson Raceway Park in Tucson, Arizona.

TNN originally broadcast the races before ESPN took over. Broadcasters for TNN were Mike Joy, Buddy Baker, Glenn Jarrett and Ralph Sheheen. ESPN's broadcasts included Benny Parsons, Bob Jenkins, and Bill Weber. During the 1998 broadcast, Larry Rice, Rick DeBruhl and Ray Dunlap served as fill-ins for Parsons and Weber.

There were six to eight races per winter. The first season of Winter Heat featured the then-brand new SuperTruck Series (which ran various exhibition races during the 1994–95 seasons), the Winston West Series and the NASCAR Featherlite Southwest Tour. In later years when ESPN covered the events, there generally were three late model races (called the Winston Triple Crown), and a race or two from the NASCAR Featherlite Southwest Tour and Winston West Series. Ron Hornaday Jr. won the first ever Southwest Winter Heat race while Garrett Evans won the second.

== Late model champions ==
- 1995–96: Greg Biffle
- 1996–97: Carl Trimmer
- 1997–98:
- 1998–99: Marc Groskreutz

== Notable drivers to gain national attention from the series ==
- Greg Biffle
- Kurt Busch
- Matt Crafton
- Rick Crawford
- Shane Hall
- Kevin Harvick
- Ron Hornaday, Jr
- Ronnie Hornaday
- Hershel McGriff
- Chris Raudman
- Craig Raudman
- Mike Skinner
- Chris Trickle
