= Chris Raudman =

American stock car racing driver

- Nationality: (United States) American
- Born: August 26, 1963 Redding, California, U.S.
- Died: 28 October 2021 (aged 58) Redding, California, U.S.

NASCAR Featherlite Southwest Series
- Years active: 1994-1998
- Starts: 44
- Wins: 5
- Poles: 4
- Best finish: 1st in 1996

Championship titles
- 1996: NASCAR Featherlite Southwest Tour

Awards
- 1996: NASCAR Featherlite Southwest Tour Rookie of the Year

Chris Raudman (August 26, 1963 - October 28, 2021) was an American stock car racing driver. He was a regular competitor in the NASCAR Featherlite Southwest Tour, and was the series' 1996 champion; he also attempted to qualify for one NASCAR Winston Cup Series race during his career.

== Career ==
The brother of Craig Raudman, Chris Raudman began his racing career competing in Late model stock car at Shasta Raceway Park; in 1994, he won the track's Late Model championship. He finished tenth in the Sunbelt Region standings of NASCAR's Winston Racing Series that season.

In 1996, Raudman moved full-time to the NASCAR Featherlite Southwest Tour, a regional late-model-style series, competing for the series' Rookie of the Year title. In addition to winning Rookie of the Year, he won two races on his way to beating Bryan Germone by 160 points for the series championship. Raudman also won the series' prestigious "Winter Heat Series" race at Tucson Raceway Park that year. In 1997, Raudman returned to the series, winning three races and finishing second in the series standings to Germone.

In 1998, Raudman attempted to make his debut in the NASCAR Winston Cup Series, driving a family-owned Chevrolet at Sears Point Raceway for the Save Mart/Kragen 350. He was unable to complete a qualifying lap and failed to make the field for the race. Raudman's racing career slowed afterwards, only making occasional starts, and standing by as a relief driver for his brother following an injury suffered by the latter in 2000.

Raudman died on October 28, 2021.

== Motorsports career results ==
=== NASCAR ===
(key) (Bold - Pole position awarded by qualifying time. Italics - Pole position earned by points standings or practice time. * – Most laps led.)

==== Winston Cup Series ====
NASCAR Winston Cup Series results
Year	Team	No.	Make	1	2	3	4	5	6	7	8	9	10	11	12	13	14	15	16	17	18	19	20	21	22	23	24	25	26	27	28	29	30	31	32	33	NWCC	Pts	Ref
1998	Raudman Racing	58	Chevy	DAY	CAR	LVS	ATL	DAR	BRI	TEX	MAR	TAL	CAL	CLT	DOV	RCH	MCH	POC	SON; DNQ	NHA	POC	IND	GLN	MCH	BRI	NHA	DAR	RCH	DOV	MAR	CLT	TAL	DAY	PHO	CAR	ATL	NA	0	

Sporting positions
Preceded by Lance Hooper	NASCAR Featherlite Southwest Tour Champion; 1996	Succeeded by Bryan Germone
