= 1998 Goody's Headache Powder 500 (Martinsville) =

Eighth race of the 1998 NASCAR Winston Cup Series

Race details
- Race 8 of 33 in the 1998 NASCAR Winston Cup Series
- The 1998 Goody's Headache Powder 500 program cover.
- Date: April 20, 1998
- Official name: 49th Annual Goody's Headache Powder 500
- Location: Martinsville, Virginia, Martinsville Speedway
- Course: Permanent racing facility
- Course length: 0.526 miles (0.847 km)
- Distance: 500 laps, 263 mi (423.257 km)
- Average speed: 70.709 miles per hour (113.795 km/h)

Pole position
Driver	Bobby Hamilton	Morgan-McClure Motorsports
- Time: 20.323

Most laps led
Driver	Bobby Hamilton	Morgan-McClure Motorsports
- Laps: 378

Winner
No. 4	Bobby Hamilton	Morgan-McClure Motorsports

Television in the United States
- Network: ESPN
- Announcers: Bob Jenkins, Ned Jarrett, Benny Parsons

Radio in the United States
- Radio: Motor Racing Network

The 1998 Goody's Headache Powder 500 was the eighth stock car race of the 1998 NASCAR Winston Cup Series season and the 49th iteration of the event. The race was originally scheduled to be held on Sunday, April 19, 1998, but was postponed to Monday, April 20, due to rain. The race was held in Martinsville, Virginia at Martinsville Speedway, a 0.526 miles (0.847 km) permanent oval-shaped short track. The race took the scheduled 500 laps to complete. At race's end, Morgan–McClure Motorsports driver Bobby Hamilton would manage to dominate not only the race, but most of the race weekend to take his third career NASCAR Winston Cup Series victory and his only victory of the season. The win also marked the final Winston Cup victory for Morgan–McClure Motorsports. To fill out the podium, Roush Racing driver Ted Musgrave and Robert Yates Racing driver Dale Jarrett would finish second and third, respectively.

== Background ==
The layout of Martinsville Speedway, the venue where the race was held.

Martinsville Speedway is a NASCAR-owned stock car racing track located in Henry County, in Ridgeway, Virginia, just to the south of Martinsville. At 0.526 miles (0.847 km) in length, it is the shortest track in the NASCAR Cup Series. The track was also one of the first paved oval tracks in NASCAR, being built in 1947 by H. Clay Earles. It is also the only remaining race track that has been on the NASCAR circuit from its beginning in 1948.

=== Entry list ===
- (R) denotes rookie driver.

#	Driver	Team	Make
1	Darrell Waltrip	Dale Earnhardt, Inc.	Chevrolet
2	Rusty Wallace	Penske-Kranefuss Racing	Ford
3	Dale Earnhardt	Richard Childress Racing	Chevrolet
4	Bobby Hamilton	Morgan–McClure Motorsports	Chevrolet
5	Terry Labonte	Hendrick Motorsports	Chevrolet
6	Mark Martin	Roush Racing	Ford
7	Geoff Bodine	Mattei Motorsports	Ford
8	Hut Stricklin	Stavola Brothers Racing	Chevrolet
9	Lake Speed	Melling Racing	Ford
10	Ricky Rudd	Rudd Performance Motorsports	Ford
11	Brett Bodine	Brett Bodine Racing	Ford
12	Jeremy Mayfield	Penske-Kranefuss Racing	Ford
13	Jerry Nadeau (R)	Elliott-Marino Racing	Ford
16	Ted Musgrave	Roush Racing	Ford
18	Bobby Labonte	Joe Gibbs Racing	Pontiac
21	Michael Waltrip	Wood Brothers Racing	Ford
22	Ward Burton	Bill Davis Racing	Pontiac
23	Jimmy Spencer	Haas-Carter Motorsports	Ford
24	Jeff Gordon	Hendrick Motorsports	Chevrolet
26	Johnny Benson Jr.	Roush Racing	Ford
28	Kenny Irwin Jr. (R)	Robert Yates Racing	Ford
30	Jeff Green	Bahari Racing	Pontiac
31	Morgan Shepherd	Richard Childress Racing	Chevrolet
33	Ken Schrader	Andy Petree Racing	Chevrolet
35	Todd Bodine	ISM Racing	Pontiac
36	Ernie Irvan	MB2 Motorsports	Pontiac
40	Sterling Marlin	Team SABCO	Chevrolet
41	Steve Grissom	Larry Hedrick Motorsports	Chevrolet
42	Joe Nemechek	Team SABCO	Chevrolet
43	John Andretti	Petty Enterprises	Pontiac
44	Kyle Petty	Petty Enterprises	Pontiac
46	Wally Dallenbach Jr.	Team SABCO	Chevrolet
50	Randy LaJoie	Hendrick Motorsports	Chevrolet
71	Dave Marcis	Marcis Auto Racing	Chevrolet
75	Rick Mast	Butch Mock Motorsports	Ford
77	Robert Pressley	Jasper Motorsports	Ford
78	Gary Bradberry	Triad Motorsports	Ford
81	Kenny Wallace	FILMAR Racing	Ford
88	Dale Jarrett	Robert Yates Racing	Ford
90	Dick Trickle	Donlavey Racing	Ford
91	Kevin Lepage (R)	LJ Racing	Chevrolet
94	Bill Elliott	Elliott-Marino Racing	Ford
96	David Green	American Equipment Racing	Chevrolet
97	Chad Little	Roush Racing	Ford
98	Rich Bickle	Cale Yarborough Motorsports	Ford
99	Jeff Burton	Roush Racing	Ford

== Practice ==
=== First practice ===
The first practice session was held on the morning of Friday, April 17. Dale Jarrett, driving for Robert Yates Racing, would set the fastest time in the session, with a lap of 20.249 and an average speed of 93.516 miles per hour (150.499 km/h).

Pos.	#	Driver	Team	Make	Time	Speed
1	88	Dale Jarrett	Robert Yates Racing	Ford	20.249	93.516
2	94	Bill Elliott	Elliott-Marino Racing	Ford	20.304	93.262
3	2	Rusty Wallace	Penske-Kranefuss Racing	Ford	20.310	93.235
Full first practice results

=== Second practice ===
The second practice session was held on the morning of Saturday, April 18. Joe Nemechek, driving for Team SABCO, would set the fastest time in the session, with a lap of 20.392 and an average speed of 92.860 miles per hour (149.444 km/h).

Pos.	#	Driver	Team	Make	Time	Speed
1	42	Joe Nemechek	Team SABCO	Chevrolet	20.392	92.860
2	44	Kyle Petty	Petty Enterprises	Pontiac	20.428	92.696
3	99	Jeff Burton	Roush Racing	Ford	20.440	92.642
Full second practice results

=== Final practice ===
The final practice session, sometimes referred to as Happy Hour, was held on the afternoon of Saturday, April 18. Joe Nemechek, driving for Team SABCO, would set the fastest time in the session, with a lap of 20.356 and an average speed of 93.024 miles per hour (149.708 km/h).

Pos.	#	Driver	Team	Make	Time	Speed
1	42	Joe Nemechek	Team SABCO	Chevrolet	20.356	93.024
2	43	John Andretti	Petty Enterprises	Pontiac	20.395	92.846
3	2	Rusty Wallace	Penske-Kranefuss Racing	Ford	20.429	92.692
Full Happy Hour practice results

== Qualifying ==
Qualifying was split into two rounds. The first round was held on Friday, April 17, at 3:00 PM EST. Each driver would have one lap to set a time. During the first round, the top 25 drivers in the round would be guaranteed a starting spot in the race. If a driver was not able to guarantee a spot in the first round, they had the option to scrub their time from the first round and try and run a faster lap time in a second round qualifying run, held on Saturday, April 18, at 1:15 PM EST. As with the first round, each driver would have one lap to set a time. On January 24, 1998, NASCAR would announce that the amount of provisionals given would be increased from last season. Positions 26-36 would be decided on time, while positions 37-43 would be based on provisionals. Six spots are awarded by the use of provisionals based on owner's points. The seventh is awarded to a past champion who has not otherwise qualified for the race. If no past champion needs the provisional, the next team in the owner points will be awarded a provisional.

Bobby Hamilton, driving for Morgan–McClure Motorsports, would win the pole, setting a time of 20.323 and an average speed of 93.175 miles per hour (149.951 km/h).

Three drivers would fail to qualify: Wally Dallenbach Jr., Dave Marcis, and Gary Bradberry.

=== Full qualifying results ===
Pos.	#	Driver	Team	Make	Time	Speed
1	4	Bobby Hamilton	Morgan–McClure Motorsports	Chevrolet	20.323	93.175
2	2	Rusty Wallace	Penske-Kranefuss Racing	Ford	20.325	93.166
3	24	Jeff Gordon	Hendrick Motorsports	Chevrolet	20.347	93.065
4	10	Ricky Rudd	Rudd Performance Motorsports	Ford	20.347	93.065
5	96	David Green	American Equipment Racing	Chevrolet	20.400	92.824
6	33	Ken Schrader	Andy Petree Racing	Chevrolet	20.416	92.751
7	94	Bill Elliott	Elliott-Marino Racing	Ford	20.428	92.696
8	43	John Andretti	Petty Enterprises	Pontiac	20.442	92.633
9	42	Joe Nemechek	Team SABCO	Chevrolet	20.455	92.574
10	18	Bobby Labonte	Joe Gibbs Racing	Pontiac	20.456	92.569
11	98	Rich Bickle	Cale Yarborough Motorsports	Ford	20.459	92.556
12	16	Ted Musgrave	Roush Racing	Ford	20.466	92.524
13	12	Jeremy Mayfield	Penske-Kranefuss Racing	Ford	20.478	92.470
14	1	Darrell Waltrip	Dale Earnhardt, Inc.	Chevrolet	20.485	92.438
15	99	Jeff Burton	Roush Racing	Ford	20.493	92.402
16	44	Kyle Petty	Petty Enterprises	Pontiac	20.493	92.402
17	81	Kenny Wallace	FILMAR Racing	Ford	20.495	92.393
18	6	Mark Martin	Roush Racing	Ford	20.504	92.353
19	11	Brett Bodine	Brett Bodine Racing	Ford	20.508	92.335
20	22	Ward Burton	Bill Davis Racing	Pontiac	20.527	92.249
21	40	Sterling Marlin	Team SABCO	Chevrolet	20.559	92.106
22	36	Ernie Irvan	MB2 Motorsports	Pontiac	20.567	92.070
23	88	Dale Jarrett	Robert Yates Racing	Ford	20.597	91.936
24	9	Lake Speed	Melling Racing	Ford	20.597	91.936
25	8	Hut Stricklin	Stavola Brothers Racing	Chevrolet	20.613	91.864
26	23	Jimmy Spencer	Travis Carter Enterprises	Ford	20.615	91.855
27	21	Michael Waltrip	Wood Brothers Racing	Ford	20.634	91.771
28	75	Rick Mast	Butch Mock Motorsports	Ford	20.645	91.722
29	77	Robert Pressley	Jasper Motorsports	Ford	20.660	91.655
30	31	Morgan Shepherd	Richard Childress Racing	Chevrolet	20.661	91.651
31	3	Dale Earnhardt	Richard Childress Racing	Chevrolet	20.665	91.633
32	41	Steve Grissom	Larry Hedrick Motorsports	Chevrolet	20.674	91.593
33	91	Kevin Lepage (R)	LJ Racing	Chevrolet	20.681	91.562
34	35	Todd Bodine	ISM Racing	Pontiac	20.691	91.518
35	28	Kenny Irwin Jr. (R)	Robert Yates Racing	Ford	20.697	91.492
36	50	Randy LaJoie	Hendrick Motorsports	Chevrolet	20.706	91.452
Provisionals
37	26	Johnny Benson Jr.	Roush Racing	Ford	-*	-*
38	97	Chad Little	Roush Racing	Ford	-*	-*
39	90	Dick Trickle	Donlavey Racing	Ford	-*	-*
40	7	Geoff Bodine	Mattei Motorsports	Ford	-*	-*
41	30	Jeff Green	Bahari Racing	Pontiac	-*	-*
42	13	Jerry Nadeau (R)	Elliott-Marino Racing	Ford	-*	-*
43	5	Terry Labonte	Hendrick Motorsports	Chevrolet	-*	-*
Failed to qualify
44	46	Wally Dallenbach Jr.	Team SABCO	Chevrolet	20.733	91.333
45	71	Dave Marcis	Marcis Auto Racing	Chevrolet	20.882	90.681
46	78	Gary Bradberry	Triad Motorsports	Ford	21.000	90.171
Official qualifying results

*Time not available.

== Race results ==
Fin	St	#	Driver	Team	Make	Laps	Led	Status	Pts	Winnings
1	1	4	Bobby Hamilton	Morgan–McClure Motorsports	Chevrolet	500	378	running	185	$227,025
2	12	16	Ted Musgrave	Roush Racing	Ford	500	0	running	170	$65,675
3	23	88	Dale Jarrett	Robert Yates Racing	Ford	500	0	running	165	$58,525
4	31	3	Dale Earnhardt	Richard Childress Racing	Chevrolet	500	33	running	165	$49,475
5	36	50	Randy LaJoie	Hendrick Motorsports	Chevrolet	500	0	running	155	$44,325
6	2	2	Rusty Wallace	Penske-Kranefuss Racing	Ford	500	3	running	155	$41,525
7	13	12	Jeremy Mayfield	Penske-Kranefuss Racing	Ford	499	0	running	146	$35,425
8	3	24	Jeff Gordon	Hendrick Motorsports	Chevrolet	499	19	running	147	$47,000
9	22	36	Ernie Irvan	MB2 Motorsports	Pontiac	499	0	running	138	$34,600
10	6	33	Ken Schrader	Andy Petree Racing	Chevrolet	499	0	running	134	$41,700
11	30	31	Morgan Shepherd	Richard Childress Racing	Chevrolet	499	0	running	130	$27,185
12	7	94	Bill Elliott	Elliott-Marino Racing	Ford	499	0	running	127	$31,750
13	19	11	Brett Bodine	Brett Bodine Racing	Ford	499	0	running	124	$33,000
14	4	10	Ricky Rudd	Rudd Performance Motorsports	Ford	499	0	running	121	$39,150
15	10	18	Bobby Labonte	Joe Gibbs Racing	Pontiac	499	0	running	118	$37,000
16	38	97	Chad Little	Roush Racing	Ford	499	0	running	115	$23,950
17	41	30	Jeff Green	Bahari Racing	Pontiac	499	0	running	112	$32,350
18	8	43	John Andretti	Petty Enterprises	Pontiac	499	59	running	114	$34,155
19	35	28	Kenny Irwin Jr. (R)	Robert Yates Racing	Ford	498	0	running	106	$36,500
20	24	9	Lake Speed	Melling Racing	Ford	498	0	running	103	$23,550
21	27	21	Michael Waltrip	Wood Brothers Racing	Ford	497	0	running	100	$29,700
22	17	81	Kenny Wallace	FILMAR Racing	Ford	497	8	running	102	$22,350
23	29	77	Robert Pressley	Jasper Motorsports	Ford	497	0	running	94	$18,500
24	9	42	Joe Nemechek	Team SABCO	Chevrolet	497	0	running	91	$27,950
25	32	41	Steve Grissom	Larry Hedrick Motorsports	Chevrolet	497	0	running	88	$27,700
26	43	5	Terry Labonte	Hendrick Motorsports	Chevrolet	496	0	running	85	$33,350
27	42	13	Jerry Nadeau (R)	Elliott-Marino Racing	Ford	496	0	running	82	$17,200
28	20	22	Ward Burton	Bill Davis Racing	Pontiac	496	0	running	79	$27,150
29	18	6	Mark Martin	Roush Racing	Ford	495	0	running	76	$33,700
30	26	23	Jimmy Spencer	Travis Carter Enterprises	Ford	493	0	running	73	$26,750
31	25	8	Hut Stricklin	Stavola Brothers Racing	Chevrolet	493	0	running	70	$19,600
32	15	99	Jeff Burton	Roush Racing	Ford	470	0	running	67	$33,075
33	28	75	Rick Mast	Butch Mock Motorsports	Ford	456	0	running	64	$18,850
34	16	44	Kyle Petty	Petty Enterprises	Pontiac	452	0	running	61	$23,225
35	40	7	Geoff Bodine	Mattei Motorsports	Ford	433	0	rear end	58	$23,100
36	21	40	Sterling Marlin	Team SABCO	Chevrolet	432	0	running	55	$16,025
37	39	90	Dick Trickle	Donlavey Racing	Ford	431	0	running	52	$22,900
38	37	26	Johnny Benson Jr.	Roush Racing	Ford	403	0	running	49	$22,750
39	34	35	Todd Bodine	ISM Racing	Pontiac	369	0	engine	46	$15,650
40	14	1	Darrell Waltrip	Dale Earnhardt, Inc.	Chevrolet	278	0	handling	43	$15,550
41	11	98	Rich Bickle	Cale Yarborough Motorsports	Ford	274	0	harmonic	40	$22,450
42	33	91	Kevin Lepage (R)	LJ Racing	Chevrolet	142	0	engine	37	$15,350
43	5	96	David Green	American Equipment Racing	Chevrolet	71	0	crash	34	$15,550
Official race results

Previous race: 1998 Texas 500	NASCAR Winston Cup Series; 1998 season	Next race: 1998 DieHard 500
