= 1998 MBNA Gold 400 =

26th race of the 1998 NASCAR Winston Cup Series

Race details
- Race 26 of 33 in the 1998 NASCAR Winston Cup Series
- The 1998 MBNA Gold 400 program cover.
- Date: September 20, 1998
- Location: Dover, Delaware, Dover International Speedway
- Course: Permanent racing facility
- Course length: 1 miles (1.6 km)
- Distance: 400 laps, 400 mi (643.737 km)
- Average speed: 113.834 miles per hour (183.198 km/h)

Pole position
Driver	Mark Martin	Roush Racing
- Time: 23.082

Most laps led
Driver	Mark Martin	Roush Racing
- Laps: 379

Winner
No. 6	Mark Martin	Roush Racing

Television in the United States
- Network: TNN
- Announcers: Ken Squier, Dick Berggren, Buddy Baker

Radio in the United States
- Radio: Motor Racing Network

The 1998 MBNA Gold 400 was the 26th stock car race of the 1998 NASCAR Winston Cup Series season and the 30th iteration of the event. The race was held on Sunday, September 20, 1998, in Dover, Delaware at Dover International Speedway, a 1-mile (1.6 km) permanent oval-shaped racetrack. The race took the scheduled 400 laps to complete. At race's end, Roush Racing driver Mark Martin would dominate the race weekend to take his 28th career NASCAR Winston Cup Series victory and his sixth victory of the season. To fill out the podium, Hendrick Motorsports driver Jeff Gordon and Penske-Kranefuss Racing driver Jeremy Mayfield would finish second and third, respectively.

The race would mark the first career NASCAR Winston Cup Series start for Matt Kenseth, who was substituting for Bill Elliott as Elliott had gone to his father's funeral.

== Background ==
The layout of Dover International Speedway, the venue where the race was held.

Dover International Speedway is an oval race track in Dover, Delaware. The track features one layout, a 1-mile (1.6 km) concrete oval, with 24° banking in the turns and 9° banking on the straights. The speedway is owned and operated by Speedway Motorsports.

The track, nicknamed "The Monster Mile", was built in 1969 by Melvin Joseph of Melvin L. Joseph Construction Company, Inc., with an asphalt surface, but was replaced with concrete in 1995. Six years later in 2001, the track's capacity moved to 135,000 seats, making the track have the largest capacity of sports venue in the mid-Atlantic. In 2002, the name changed to Dover International Speedway from Dover Downs International Speedway after Dover Downs Gaming and Entertainment split, making Dover Motorsports. From 2007 to 2009, the speedway worked on an improvement project called "The Monster Makeover", which expanded facilities at the track and beautified the track. After the 2014 season, the track's capacity was reduced to 95,500 seats.

=== Entry list ===
- (R) denotes rookie driver.

#	Driver	Team	Make
00	Buckshot Jones	Stavola Brothers Racing	Chevrolet
1	Steve Park (R)	Dale Earnhardt, Inc.	Chevrolet
2	Rusty Wallace	Penske-Kranefuss Racing	Ford
3	Dale Earnhardt	Richard Childress Racing	Chevrolet
4	Bobby Hamilton	Morgan–McClure Motorsports	Chevrolet
5	Terry Labonte	Hendrick Motorsports	Chevrolet
6	Mark Martin	Roush Racing	Ford
7	Geoff Bodine	Mattei Motorsports	Ford
9	Jerry Nadeau (R)	Melling Racing	Ford
10	Ricky Rudd	Rudd Performance Motorsports	Ford
11	Brett Bodine	Brett Bodine Racing	Ford
12	Jeremy Mayfield	Penske-Kranefuss Racing	Ford
13	Ted Musgrave	Elliott-Marino Racing	Ford
16	Kevin Lepage (R)	Roush Racing	Ford
18	Bobby Labonte	Joe Gibbs Racing	Pontiac
21	Michael Waltrip	Wood Brothers Racing	Ford
22	Ward Burton	Bill Davis Racing	Pontiac
23	Jimmy Spencer	Travis Carter Enterprises	Ford
24	Jeff Gordon	Hendrick Motorsports	Chevrolet
26	Johnny Benson Jr.	Roush Racing	Ford
28	Kenny Irwin Jr. (R)	Robert Yates Racing	Ford
30	Derrike Cope	Bahari Racing	Pontiac
31	Mike Skinner	Richard Childress Racing	Chevrolet
33	Ken Schrader	Andy Petree Racing	Chevrolet
35	Darrell Waltrip	Tyler Jet Motorsports	Pontiac
36	Ernie Irvan	MB2 Motorsports	Pontiac
40	Sterling Marlin	Team SABCO	Chevrolet
41	Steve Grissom	Larry Hedrick Motorsports	Chevrolet
42	Joe Nemechek	Team SABCO	Chevrolet
43	John Andretti	Petty Enterprises	Pontiac
44	Kyle Petty	Petty Enterprises	Pontiac
46	Jeff Green	Team SABCO	Chevrolet
50	Wally Dallenbach Jr.	Hendrick Motorsports	Chevrolet
71	Dave Marcis	Marcis Auto Racing	Chevrolet
75	Rick Mast	Butch Mock Motorsports	Ford
77	Hut Stricklin	Jasper Motorsports	Ford
78	Gary Bradberry	Triad Motorsports	Ford
81	Kenny Wallace	FILMAR Racing	Ford
88	Dale Jarrett	Robert Yates Racing	Ford
90	Dick Trickle	Donlavey Racing	Ford
91	Todd Bodine	LJ Racing	Chevrolet
94	Matt Kenseth	Elliott-Marino Racing	Ford
96	Morgan Shepherd	American Equipment Racing	Chevrolet
97	Chad Little	Roush Racing	Ford
98	Rich Bickle	Cale Yarborough Motorsports	Ford
99	Jeff Burton	Roush Racing	Ford

== Practice ==
=== First practice ===
The first practice session was held on Friday, September 19, at 10:15 AM EST. The session would last for one hour and 15 minutes. Ricky Rudd, driving for Rudd Performance Motorsports, would set the fastest time in the session, with a lap of 23.056 and an average speed of 156.142 miles per hour (251.286 km/h).

Pos.	#	Driver	Team	Make	Time	Speed
1	10	Ricky Rudd	Rudd Performance Motorsports	Ford	23.056	156.142
2	90	Dick Trickle	Donlavey Racing	Ford	23.136	155.602
3	6	Mark Martin	Roush Racing	Ford	23.138	155.588
Full first practice results

=== Second practice ===
The second practice session was held on Friday, September 19, at 12:45 PM EST. The session would last for one hour and 15 minutes. Mark Martin, driving for Roush Racing, would set the fastest time in the session, with a lap of 23.008 and an average speed of 156.467 miles per hour (251.809 km/h).

Pos.	#	Driver	Team	Make	Time	Speed
1	6	Mark Martin	Roush Racing	Ford	23.008	156.467
2	90	Dick Trickle	Donlavey Racing	Ford	23.140	155.575
3	18	Bobby Labonte	Joe Gibbs Racing	Pontiac	23.143	155.555
Full second practice results

=== Final practice ===
The final practice session was held Saturday, September 19. The session would last for one hour. Rusty Wallace, driving for Penske-Kranefuss Racing, would set the fastest time in the session, with a lap of 23.781 and an average speed of 151.381 miles per hour (243.624 km/h).

Pos.	#	Driver	Team	Make	Time	Speed
1	2	Rusty Wallace	Penske-Kranefuss Racing	Ford	23.781	151.381
2	6	Mark Martin	Roush Racing	Ford	23.791	151.318
3	44	Kyle Petty	Petty Enterprises	Pontiac	23.851	150.937
Full final practice results

== Qualifying ==
Qualifying was split into two rounds. The first round was held on Friday, September 18, at 3:30 PM EST. Each driver would have one lap to set a time. During the first round, the top 25 drivers in the round would be guaranteed a starting spot in the race. If a driver was not able to guarantee a spot in the first round, they had the option to scrub their time from the first round and try and run a faster lap time in a second round qualifying run, held on Saturday, September 19, at 11:30 AM EST. As with the first round, each driver would have one lap to set a time. On January 24, 1998, NASCAR would announce that the amount of provisionals given would be increased from last season. Positions 26-36 would be decided on time, while positions 37-43 would be based on provisionals. Six spots are awarded by the use of provisionals based on owner's points. The seventh is awarded to a past champion who has not otherwise qualified for the race. If no past champion needs the provisional, the next team in the owner points will be awarded a provisional.

Mark Martin, driving for Roush Racing, would win the pole, setting a time of 23.082 and an average speed of 155.966 miles per hour (251.003 km/h).

Three drivers would fail to qualify: Morgan Shepherd, Steve Grissom, and Dave Marcis.

=== Full qualifying results ===
Pos.	#	Driver	Team	Make	Time	Speed
1	6	Mark Martin	Roush Racing	Ford	23.082	155.966
2	2	Rusty Wallace	Penske-Kranefuss Racing	Ford	23.118	155.723
3	30	Derrike Cope	Bahari Racing	Pontiac	23.154	155.481
4	16	Kevin Lepage (R)	Roush Racing	Ford	23.163	155.420
5	18	Bobby Labonte	Joe Gibbs Racing	Pontiac	23.169	155.380
6	24	Jeff Gordon	Hendrick Motorsports	Chevrolet	23.171	155.367
7	43	John Andretti	Petty Enterprises	Pontiac	23.190	155.239
8	9	Jerry Nadeau (R)	Melling Racing	Ford	23.212	155.092
9	90	Dick Trickle	Donlavey Racing	Ford	23.227	154.992
10	88	Dale Jarrett	Robert Yates Racing	Ford	23.244	154.879
11	10	Ricky Rudd	Rudd Performance Motorsports	Ford	23.247	154.859
12	28	Kenny Irwin Jr. (R)	Robert Yates Racing	Ford	23.251	154.832
13	1	Steve Park (R)	Dale Earnhardt, Inc.	Chevrolet	23.258	154.785
14	00	Buckshot Jones	Stavola Brothers Racing	Chevrolet	23.271	154.699
15	7	Geoff Bodine	Mattei Motorsports	Ford	23.285	154.606
16	94	Matt Kenseth	Elliott-Marino Racing	Ford	23.303	154.487
17	22	Ward Burton	Bill Davis Racing	Pontiac	23.310	154.440
18	46	Jeff Green	Team SABCO	Chevrolet	23.334	154.281
19	42	Joe Nemechek	Team SABCO	Chevrolet	23.356	154.136
20	31	Mike Skinner	Richard Childress Racing	Chevrolet	23.361	154.103
21	13	Ted Musgrave	Elliott-Marino Racing	Ford	23.371	154.037
22	44	Kyle Petty	Petty Enterprises	Pontiac	23.373	154.024
23	36	Ernie Irvan	MB2 Motorsports	Pontiac	23.395	153.879
24	5	Terry Labonte	Hendrick Motorsports	Chevrolet	23.400	153.846
25	26	Johnny Benson Jr.	Roush Racing	Ford	23.400	153.846
26	91	Todd Bodine	LJ Racing	Chevrolet	23.345	154.209
27	99	Jeff Burton	Roush Racing	Ford	23.409	153.787
28	12	Jeremy Mayfield	Penske-Kranefuss Racing	Ford	23.412	153.767
29	33	Ken Schrader	Andy Petree Racing	Chevrolet	23.421	153.708
30	23	Jimmy Spencer	Travis Carter Enterprises	Ford	23.432	153.636
31	11	Brett Bodine	Brett Bodine Racing	Ford	23.439	153.590
32	21	Michael Waltrip	Wood Brothers Racing	Ford	23.455	153.485
33	35	Darrell Waltrip	Tyler Jet Motorsports	Pontiac	23.473	153.368
34	81	Kenny Wallace	FILMAR Racing	Ford	23.481	153.315
35	40	Sterling Marlin	Team SABCO	Chevrolet	23.487	153.276
36	78	Gary Bradberry	Triad Motorsports	Ford	23.497	153.211
Provisionals
37	4	Bobby Hamilton	Morgan–McClure Motorsports	Chevrolet	-*	-*
38	97	Chad Little	Roush Racing	Ford	-*	-*
39	50	Wally Dallenbach Jr.	Hendrick Motorsports	Chevrolet	-*	-*
40	77	Hut Stricklin	Jasper Motorsports	Ford	-*	-*
41	75	Rick Mast	Butch Mock Motorsports	Ford	-*	-*
42	98	Rich Bickle	Cale Yarborough Motorsports	Ford	-*	-*
Champion's Provisional
43	3	Dale Earnhardt	Richard Childress Racing	Chevrolet	-*	-*
Failed to qualify
44	96	Morgan Shepherd	American Equipment Racing	Chevrolet	23.575	152.704
45	41	Steve Grissom	Larry Hedrick Motorsports	Chevrolet	23.600	152.542
46	71	Dave Marcis	Marcis Auto Racing	Chevrolet	23.726	151.732
Official qualifying results

== Race results ==
Fin	St	#	Driver	Team	Make	Laps	Led	Status	Pts	Winnings
1	1	6	Mark Martin	Roush Racing	Ford	400	379	running	185	$126,130
2	6	24	Jeff Gordon	Hendrick Motorsports	Chevrolet	400	6	running	175	$77,005
3	28	12	Jeremy Mayfield	Penske-Kranefuss Racing	Ford	400	0	running	165	$49,305
4	5	18	Bobby Labonte	Joe Gibbs Racing	Pontiac	400	0	running	160	$57,410
5	2	2	Rusty Wallace	Penske-Kranefuss Racing	Ford	400	13	running	160	$40,370
6	16	94	Matt Kenseth	Elliott-Marino Racing	Ford	400	0	running	150	$42,340
7	10	88	Dale Jarrett	Robert Yates Racing	Ford	400	0	running	146	$43,590
8	23	36	Ernie Irvan	MB2 Motorsports	Pontiac	400	0	running	142	$34,440
9	7	43	John Andretti	Petty Enterprises	Pontiac	400	1	running	143	$37,640
10	37	4	Bobby Hamilton	Morgan–McClure Motorsports	Chevrolet	399	1	running	139	$43,540
11	13	1	Steve Park (R)	Dale Earnhardt, Inc.	Chevrolet	399	0	running	130	$24,640
12	4	16	Kevin Lepage (R)	Roush Racing	Ford	399	0	running	127	$31,040
13	11	10	Ricky Rudd	Rudd Performance Motorsports	Ford	399	0	running	124	$35,140
14	15	7	Geoff Bodine	Mattei Motorsports	Ford	398	0	running	121	$30,240
15	25	26	Johnny Benson Jr.	Roush Racing	Ford	398	0	running	118	$31,290
16	35	40	Sterling Marlin	Team SABCO	Chevrolet	398	0	running	115	$21,640
17	38	97	Chad Little	Roush Racing	Ford	397	0	running	112	$21,540
18	24	5	Terry Labonte	Hendrick Motorsports	Chevrolet	397	0	running	109	$33,425
19	42	98	Rich Bickle	Cale Yarborough Motorsports	Ford	397	0	running	106	$28,040
20	32	21	Michael Waltrip	Wood Brothers Racing	Ford	396	0	running	103	$30,640
21	33	35	Darrell Waltrip	Tyler Jet Motorsports	Pontiac	396	0	running	100	$17,240
22	31	11	Brett Bodine	Brett Bodine Racing	Ford	396	0	running	97	$27,690
23	43	3	Dale Earnhardt	Richard Childress Racing	Chevrolet	396	0	running	94	$32,140
24	41	75	Rick Mast	Butch Mock Motorsports	Ford	396	0	running	91	$22,490
25	39	50	Wally Dallenbach Jr.	Hendrick Motorsports	Chevrolet	396	0	running	88	$27,315
26	21	13	Ted Musgrave	Elliott-Marino Racing	Ford	396	0	running	85	$16,965
27	30	23	Jimmy Spencer	Travis Carter Enterprises	Ford	394	0	running	82	$28,115
28	36	78	Gary Bradberry	Triad Motorsports	Ford	394	0	running	79	$16,865
29	19	42	Joe Nemechek	Team SABCO	Chevrolet	392	0	running	76	$26,915
30	40	77	Hut Stricklin	Jasper Motorsports	Ford	391	0	running	73	$20,265
31	9	90	Dick Trickle	Donlavey Racing	Ford	370	0	engine	70	$26,715
32	20	31	Mike Skinner	Richard Childress Racing	Chevrolet	367	0	running	67	$19,155
33	17	22	Ward Burton	Bill Davis Racing	Pontiac	347	0	running	64	$23,605
34	18	46	Jeff Green	Team SABCO	Chevrolet	319	0	oil leak	61	$16,555
35	3	30	Derrike Cope	Bahari Racing	Pontiac	314	0	engine	58	$23,480
36	8	9	Jerry Nadeau (R)	Melling Racing	Ford	313	0	crash	55	$18,855
37	26	91	Todd Bodine	LJ Racing	Chevrolet	310	0	crash	52	$16,855
38	27	99	Jeff Burton	Roush Racing	Ford	262	0	crash	49	$32,955
39	29	33	Ken Schrader	Andy Petree Racing	Chevrolet	237	0	engine	46	$23,355
40	12	28	Kenny Irwin Jr. (R)	Robert Yates Racing	Ford	168	0	crash	43	$31,355
41	22	44	Kyle Petty	Petty Enterprises	Pontiac	142	0	engine	40	$23,355
42	14	00	Buckshot Jones	Stavola Brothers Racing	Chevrolet	84	0	engine	37	$16,355
43	34	81	Kenny Wallace	FILMAR Racing	Ford	2	0	engine	34	$16,355
Official race results

Previous race: 1998 Exide NASCAR Select Batteries 400	NASCAR Winston Cup Series; 1998 season	Next race: 1998 NAPA Autocare 500
