= 1998 NASCAR Winston Cup Series =

American motorsport season

Seasons
- ← 1997 1999 →

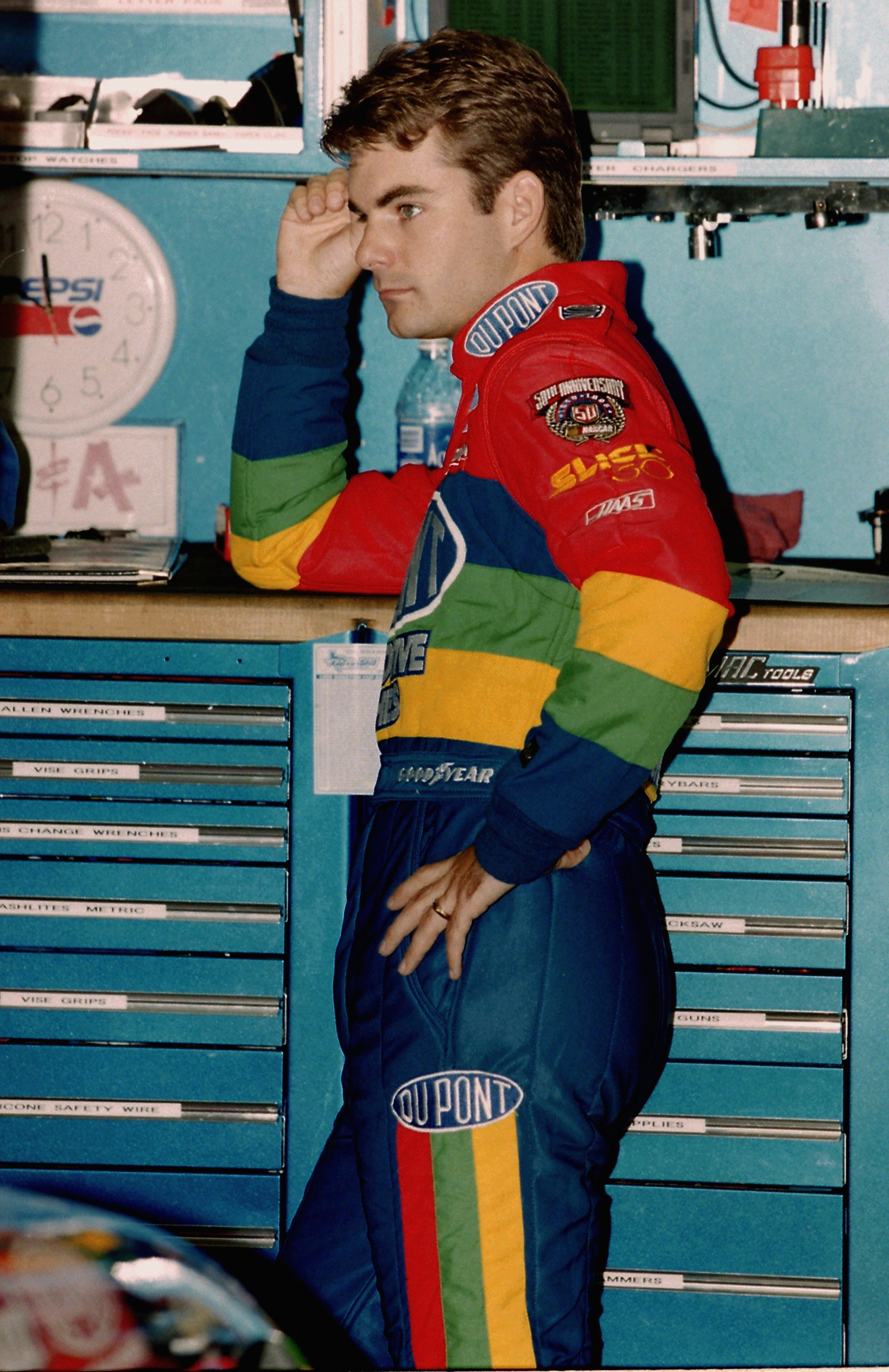
The 1998 Winston Cup Champion Jeff Gordon. It was Gordon's third championship in four years.

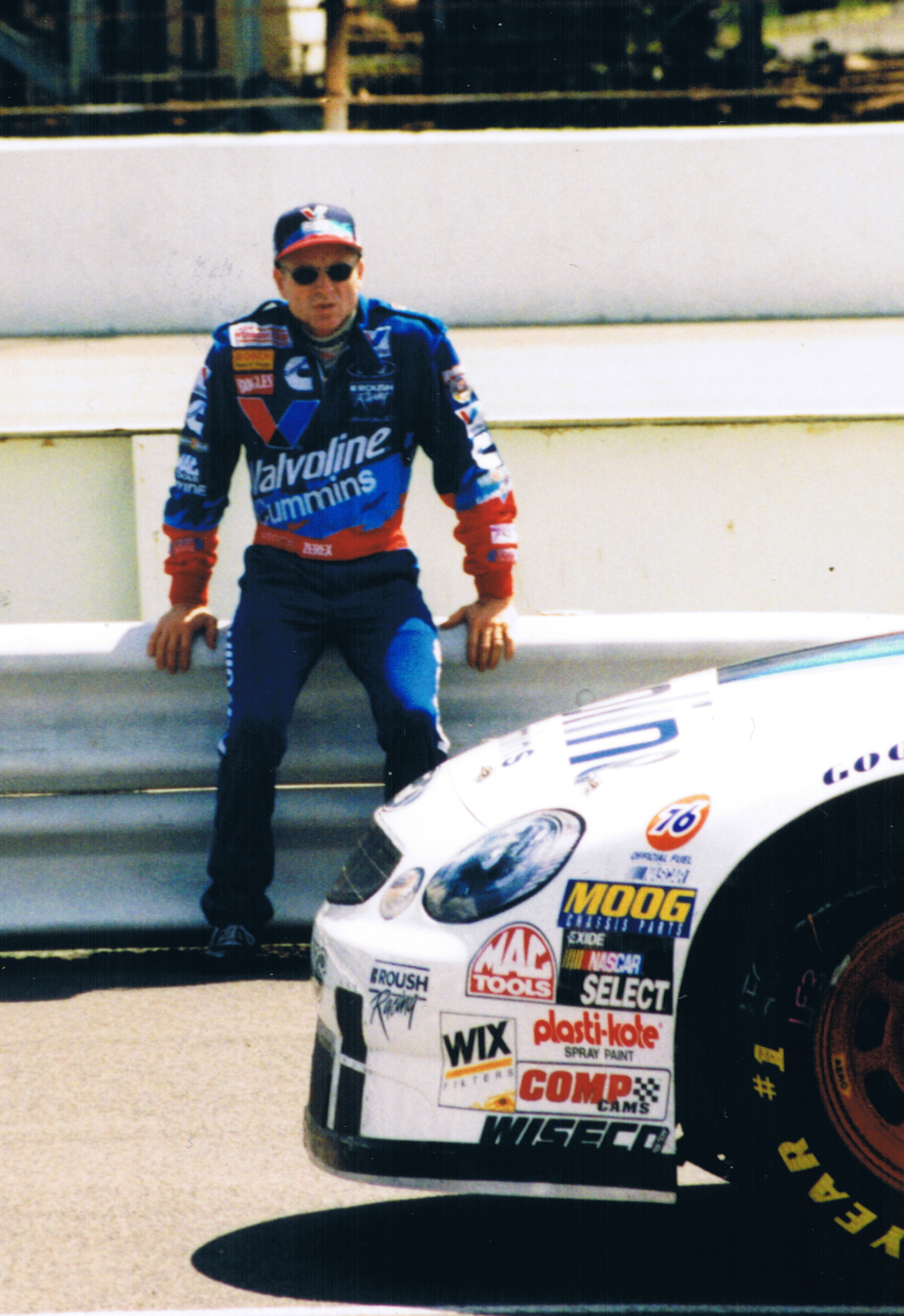
Mark Martin finished second behind Gordon by 364 points

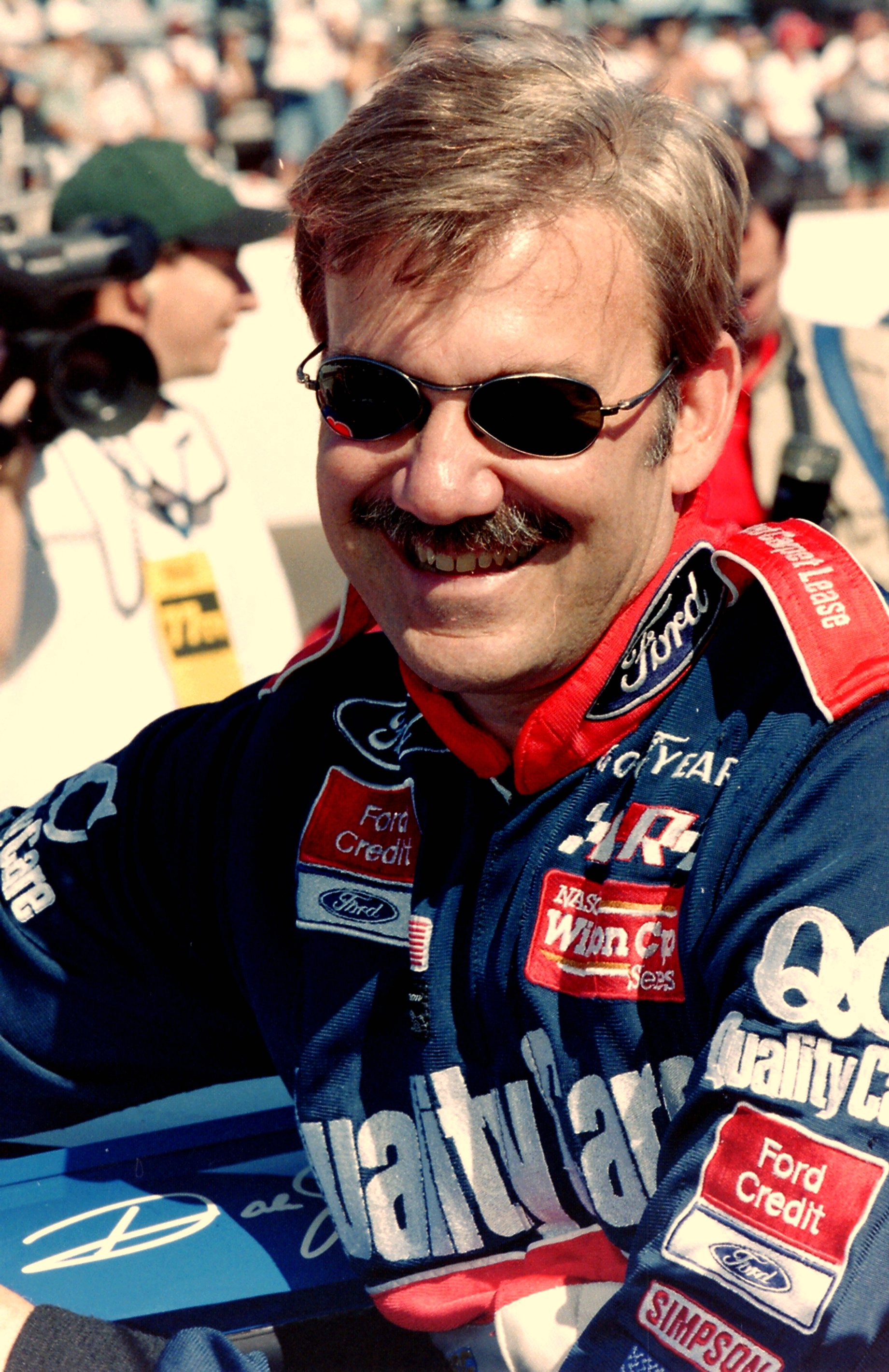
Dale Jarrett finished third in the championship

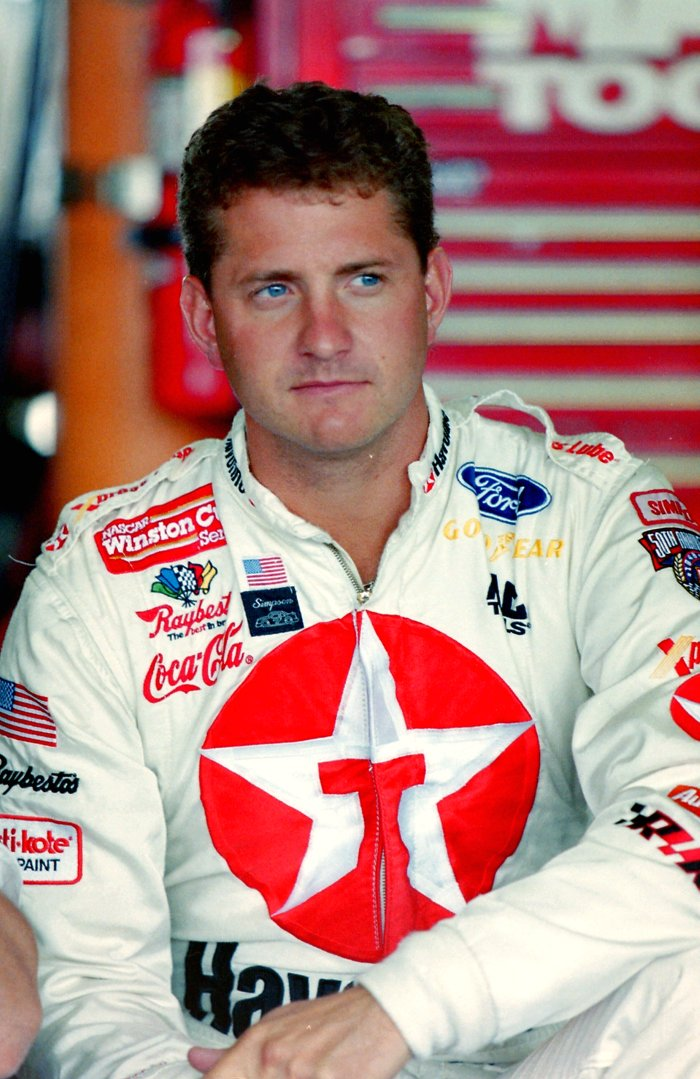
Kenny Irwin Jr., the 1998 NASCAR Rookie of the Year.

The 1998 NASCAR Winston Cup Series was the 50th season of professional stock car racing in the United States and the 27th modern-era cup series. The season included 33 races and three exhibition races, beginning with the Daytona 500 at Daytona International Speedway and ending with the NAPA 500 at Atlanta Motor Speedway. Jeff Gordon won the Driver's Championship, the third of his career, and his third in the last four seasons.

== Teams and drivers ==
=== Complete schedule ===
Manufacturer	Team	No.	Race Driver	Crew Chief
Chevrolet	American Equipment Racing	96	David Green 12	Sammy Johns
Chevrolet	American Equipment Racing	96	Kevin Lepage (R) 1	Sammy Johns
Chevrolet	American Equipment Racing	96	Hut Stricklin 8	Sammy Johns
Chevrolet	American Equipment Racing	96	Robby Gordon 1	Sammy Johns
Chevrolet	American Equipment Racing	96	Ron Fellows 2	Sammy Johns
Chevrolet	American Equipment Racing	96	Ted Musgrave 1	Sammy Johns
Chevrolet	American Equipment Racing	96	Morgan Shepherd 1	Sammy Johns
Chevrolet	American Equipment Racing	96	Mike Bliss 2	Sammy Johns
Chevrolet	American Equipment Racing	96	Steve Grissom 5	Sammy Johns
Chevrolet	Andy Petree Racing	33	Ken Schrader	Andy Petree
Chevrolet	Dale Earnhardt, Inc.	1	Steve Park (R) 18	Phillipe Lopez
Chevrolet	Dale Earnhardt, Inc.	1	Phil Parsons 1	Phillipe Lopez
Chevrolet	Dale Earnhardt, Inc.	1	Ron Hornaday Jr. 1	Phillipe Lopez
Chevrolet	Dale Earnhardt, Inc.	1	Darrell Waltrip 13	Phillipe Lopez
Chevrolet	Hendrick Motorsports	5	Terry Labonte	Andy Graves
Chevrolet	Hendrick Motorsports	24	Jeff Gordon	Ray Evernham
Chevrolet	Hendrick Motorsports	50	Ricky Craven 8	Tony Furr
Chevrolet	Hendrick Motorsports	50	Randy LaJoie 9	Tony Furr
Chevrolet	Hendrick Motorsports	50	Wally Dallenbach Jr. 16	Tony Furr
Chevrolet	Larry Hedrick Motorsports	41	Steve Grissom 26	Tim Brewer
Chevrolet	Larry Hedrick Motorsports	41	David Green 5	Tim Brewer
Chevrolet	Larry Hedrick Motorsports	41	Rick Wilson 2	Tim Brewer
Chevrolet	LJ Racing	91	Kevin Lepage (R) 15	Doug Richert
Chevrolet	LJ Racing	91	Tommy Kendall 1	Doug Richert
Chevrolet	LJ Racing	91	Andy Hillenburg 3	Doug Richert
Chevrolet	LJ Racing	91	Morgan Shepherd 7	Doug Richert
Chevrolet	LJ Racing	91	Todd Bodine 7	Doug Richert
Chevrolet	Marcis Auto Racing	71	Dave Marcis	Bob Marcis
Chevrolet	Morgan-McClure Motorsports	4	Bobby Hamilton	Charley Pressley
Chevrolet	Richard Childress Racing	3	Dale Earnhardt	Larry McReynolds 13; Kevin Hamlin 20
Chevrolet	Richard Childress Racing	31	Mike Skinner 30	Kevin Hamlin
Chevrolet	Richard Childress Racing	31	Morgan Shepherd 2	Kevin Hamlin
Chevrolet	Richard Childress Racing	31	Mike Dillon 1	Kevin Hamlin
Chevrolet	Team SABCO	40	Sterling Marlin	Corrie Stott
Chevrolet	Team SABCO	42	Joe Nemechek	Scott Eggleston
Chevrolet	Team SABCO	46	Wally Dallenbach Jr. 8	Gary Grossenbacher
Chevrolet	Team SABCO	46	Morgan Shepherd 4	Gary Grossenbacher
Chevrolet	Team SABCO	46	Jeff Green 20	Gary Grossenbacher
Chevrolet	Team SABCO	46	Tommy Kendall 1	Gary Grossenbacher
Ford	Butch Mock Motorsports	75	Rick Mast	Dave Charpentier
Ford	Cale Yarborough Motorsports	98	Greg Sacks 7	Michael McSwain
Ford	Cale Yarborough Motorsports	98	Rich Bickle 26	Michael McSwain
Ford	Donlavey Racing	90	Dick Trickle	Junie Donlavey
Ford	Elliott-Marino Racing	13	Jerry Nadeau (R) 16	Jerry Pitts
Ford	Elliott-Marino Racing	13	Dennis Setzer 7	Jerry Pitts
Ford	Elliott-Marino Racing	13	Wally Dallenbach Jr. 2	Jerry Pitts
Ford	Elliott-Marino Racing	13	Tom Hubert 1	Jerry Pitts
Ford	Elliott-Marino Racing	13	Ted Musgrave 7	Jerry Pitts
Ford	Elliott-Marino Racing	94	Bill Elliott 32	Joe Garone
Ford	Elliott-Marino Racing	94	Matt Kenseth 1	Joe Garone
Ford	FILMAR Racing	81	Kenny Wallace	David Ifft
Ford	Jasper Motorsports	77	Robert Pressley 31	Newt Moore
Ford	Jasper Motorsports	77	Hut Stricklin 1	Newt Moore
Ford	Jasper Motorsports	77	Ted Musgrave 1	Newt Moore
Ford	Mattei Motorsports	7	Geoff Bodine	Pete Peterson
Ford	Melling Racing	9	Lake Speed 16	Jeff Buice
Ford	Melling Racing	9	Butch Gilliland 1	Jeff Buice
Ford	Melling Racing	9	Jerry Nadeau (R) 16	Jeff Buice
Ford	Penske Racing South; Penske-Kranefuss Racing	2	Rusty Wallace	Robin Pemberton
Ford	Penske Racing South; Penske-Kranefuss Racing	12	Jeremy Mayfield	Paul Andrews
Ford	Robert Yates Racing	28	Kenny Irwin Jr. (R)	Marc Reno
Ford	Robert Yates Racing	88	Dale Jarrett	Todd Parrott
Ford	Roush Racing	6	Mark Martin	Jimmy Fennig
Ford	Roush Racing	16	Ted Musgrave 20	James Ince
Ford	Roush Racing	16	Kevin Lepage (R) 13	James Ince
Ford	Roush Racing	26	Johnny Benson	Ben Leslie
Ford	Roush Racing	97	Chad Little	Jeff Hammond
Ford	Roush Racing	99	Jeff Burton	Frank Stoddard
Ford	Rudd Performance Motorsports	10	Ricky Rudd	Bill Ingle
Ford	Team Scandia; Brett Bodine Racing	11	Brett Bodine	Gere Kennon
Ford	Travis Carter Enterprises	23	Jimmy Spencer 31	Donnie Wingo
Ford	Travis Carter Enterprises	23	Frank Kimmel 1	Donnie Wingo
Ford	Travis Carter Enterprises	23	Ted Musgrave 1	Donnie Wingo
Ford	Wood Brothers Racing	21	Michael Waltrip	Glen Wood
Pontiac	Bahari Racing	30	Derrike Cope 32	Doug Hewitt
Pontiac	Bahari Racing	30	Jeff Green 1	Doug Hewitt
Pontiac	Bill Davis Racing	22	Ward Burton	Tommy Baldwin Jr.
Pontiac	ISM Racing	35	Todd Bodine 15	Pat Tryson 18; Phil Hammer 15
Pontiac	ISM Racing	35	Wally Dallenbach Jr. 1	Pat Tryson 18; Phil Hammer 15
Pontiac	ISM Racing	35	Gary Bradberry 1	Pat Tryson 18; Phil Hammer 15
Pontiac	ISM Racing	35	Jimmy Horton 1	Pat Tryson 18; Phil Hammer 15
Pontiac	Tyler Jet Motorsports †	35	Darrell Waltrip 15	Pat Tryson 18; Phil Hammer 15
Pontiac	Joe Gibbs Racing	18	Bobby Labonte	Jimmy Makar
Pontiac	MB2 Motorsports	36	Ernie Irvan 30	Ryan Pemberton
Pontiac	MB2 Motorsports	36	Ricky Craven 3	Ryan Pemberton
Pontiac	Petty Enterprises	43	John Andretti	Robbie Loomis
Pontiac	PE2	44	Kyle Petty	Bobby Kennedy

=== Limited schedule ===
Manufacturer	Team	No.	Race Driver	Crew Chief	Round(s)
Chevrolet	Andy Petree Racing	55	Hut Stricklin	Jimmy Elledge	1
Chevrolet	Barkdoll Racing	73	Mike Wallace		1
Chevrolet	BMR Motorsports	45	Jeff Ward		1
Chevrolet	Buckshot Racing †	00	Buckshot Jones	Ricky Pearson	7
Chevrolet	Chris Raudman Racing	58	Chris Raudman		1
Chevrolet	Darrell Waltrip Motorsports	17	Darrell Waltrip	Dave McCarty	5
Chevrolet	Tyler Jet Motorsports	17	Ron Hornaday Jr.	Phil Hammer	1
Chevrolet	Diamond Ridge Motorsports	29	Jeff Green		7
Chevrolet	Diamond Ridge Motorsports	92	Elliott Sadler	Butch Hylton 1 Sandy Jones 1	2
Chevrolet	Gerhart Racing	54	Bobby Gerhart		1
Chevrolet	Highland Timber Racing	08	Harris DeVane		1
Chevrolet	Mansion Motorsports	85	Randy Renfrow		1
Chevrolet	Mansion Motorsports	85	Bob Strait		1
Chevrolet	Midwest Transit Racing	07	Dan Pardus	Chet Shirah Jr. 5 John McQueen 2	7
Chevrolet	Sadler Brothers Racing	95	Andy Hillenburg		5
Chevrolet	Sadler Brothers Racing	95	Randy MacDonald		1
Chevrolet	Stavola Brothers Racing	8	Hut Stricklin	Ross Freisinger 4 Jim Long 11	11
Chevrolet	Stavola Brothers Racing	8	Buckshot Jones	Ross Freisinger 4 Jim Long 11	2
Chevrolet	Stavola Brothers Racing	8	Morgan Shepherd	Ross Freisinger 4 Jim Long 11	2
Chevrolet	T.R.I.X. Racing	79	Norm Benning	Ted Walters	1
Chevrolet	T.R.I.X. Racing	79	Randy MacDonald	Ted Walters	1
Chevrolet	T.R.I.X. Racing	79	Ken Bouchard	Ted Walters	3
Ford	CSG Racing	59	Mark Gibson	Tony Gibson	1
Ford	CSG Racing	59	Brian Cunningham		1
Ford	Elliott-Marino Racing	89	Dennis Setzer	Mike Brandt	1
Ford	Gunselman Racing	37	Larry Gunselman		1
Ford	Hilton Racing	38	Butch Gilliland		1
Ford	Hover Motorsports	80	Mike Ciochetti		1
Ford	Hover Motorsports	80	Andy Hillenburg		3
Ford	Mansion Motorsports	85	Randy MacDonald		3
Ford	Mansion Motorsports	85	Ken Bouchard		1
Ford	Moore-Robinson Motorsports	15	Loy Allen Jr.	Joey Knuckles	1
Ford	Moore-Robinson Motorsports	15	Ted Musgrave	Joey Knuckles	2
Ford	Roehrig Motorsports	19	Tony Raines	Mike Bodick	4
Ford	Roehrig Motorsports	19	Tom Hubert	Mike Bodick	1
Ford	Roehrig Motorsports	19	Robby Gordon	Mike Bodick	1
Ford	Roush Racing	60	Matt Kenseth	Robbie Reiser	1
Ford	SBIII Motorsports	58	Rick Wilson		1
Ford	Standridge Motorsports	47	Billy Standridge	Dave Smith	6
Ford	Triad Motorsports	78	Gary Bradberry	Dennis Adcock	27
Ford	Ware Racing Enterprises	70	Rick Ware		1
Pontiac	Precision Products Racing	14	Loy Allen Jr.		1
Pontiac	Precision Products Racing	14	Lance Hooper		1
Pontiac	Shepherd Racing	05	Morgan Shepherd	J. T. Townsend	3

== Schedule ==
No.	Race title	Track	Date
	Bud Shootout Qualifier	Daytona International Speedway, Daytona Beach	February 8
	Bud Shootout	Daytona International Speedway, Daytona Beach	February 8
	Gatorade 125s	Daytona International Speedway, Daytona Beach	February 12
1	Daytona 500	Daytona International Speedway, Daytona Beach	February 15
2	GM Goodwrench Service Plus 400	North Carolina Speedway, Rockingham	February 22
3	Las Vegas 400	Las Vegas Motor Speedway, Las Vegas	March 1
4	Primestar 500	Atlanta Motor Speedway, Hampton	March 9
5	TranSouth Financial 400	Darlington Raceway, Darlington	March 22
6	Food City 500	Bristol Motor Speedway, Bristol	March 29
7	Texas 500	Texas Motor Speedway, Fort Worth	April 5
8	Goody's Headache Powder 500	Martinsville Speedway, Ridgeway	April 20
9	DieHard 500	Talladega Superspeedway, Talladega	April 26
10	California 500 presented by NAPA	California Speedway, Fontana	May 3
	No Bull 25 Shootout	Charlotte Motor Speedway, Concord	May 16
	Winston Open	Charlotte Motor Speedway, Concord	May 16
	The Winston	Charlotte Motor Speedway, Concord	May 16
11	Coca-Cola 600	Charlotte Motor Speedway, Concord	May 24
12	MBNA Platinum 400	Dover Downs International Speedway, Dover	May 31
13	Pontiac Excitement 400	Richmond International Raceway, Richmond	June 6
14	Miller Lite 400	Michigan Speedway, Brooklyn	June 14
15	Pocono 500	Pocono Raceway, Long Pond	June 21
16	Save Mart/Kragen 350	Sears Point Raceway, Sonoma	June 28
17	Jiffy Lube 300	New Hampshire International Speedway, Loudon	July 12
18	Pennsylvania 500	Pocono Raceway, Long Pond	July 26
19	Brickyard 400	Indianapolis Motor Speedway, Speedway	August 1
20	The Bud at The Glen	Watkins Glen International, Watkins Glen	August 9
21	Pepsi 400 presented by Meijer	Michigan Speedway, Brooklyn	August 16
22	Goody's Headache Powder 500	Bristol Motor Speedway, Bristol	August 22
23	Farm Aid on CMT 300	New Hampshire International Speedway, Loudon	August 30
24	Pepsi Southern 500	Darlington Raceway, Darlington	September 6
25	Exide NASCAR Select Batteries 400	Richmond International Raceway, Richmond	September 12
26	MBNA Gold 400	Dover Downs International Speedway, Dover	September 20
27	NAPA Autocare 500	Martinsville Speedway, Ridgeway	September 27
28	UAW-GM Quality 500	Charlotte Motor Speedway, Concord	October 4
29	Winston 500	Talladega Superspeedway, Talladega	October 11
30	Pepsi 400	Daytona International Speedway, Daytona Beach	October 17
31	Dura Lube/Kmart 500	Phoenix International Raceway, Phoenix	October 25
32	AC Delco 400	North Carolina Speedway, Rockingham	November 1
33	NAPA 500	Atlanta Motor Speedway, Hampton	November 8
	Coca-Cola 500	Twin Ring Motegi, Motegi	November 22

== Races ==
No.	Race	Pole position	Most laps led	Winning driver	Manufacturer
	Bud Shootout Qualifier	Sterling Marlin	Jimmy Spencer	Jimmy Spencer	Ford
	Bud Shootout	Mark Martin	Jeff Gordon	Rusty Wallace	Ford
	Gatorade 125 #1	Bobby Labonte	Bobby Labonte; Sterling Marlin	Sterling Marlin	Chevrolet
	Gatorade 125 #2	Terry Labonte	Dale Earnhardt	Dale Earnhardt	Chevrolet
1	Daytona 500	Bobby Labonte	Dale Earnhardt	Dale Earnhardt	Chevrolet
2	GM Goodwrench Service Plus 400	Rick Mast	Mark Martin	Jeff Gordon	Chevrolet
3	Las Vegas 400	Dale Jarrett	Mark Martin	Mark Martin	Ford
4	Primestar 500	John Andretti	Kenny Irwin Jr.	Bobby Labonte	Pontiac
5	TranSouth Financial 400	Mark Martin	Jeff Burton	Dale Jarrett	Ford
6	Food City 500	Rusty Wallace	Rusty Wallace	Jeff Gordon	Chevrolet
7	Texas 500	Jeremy Mayfield	Jeremy Mayfield	Mark Martin	Ford
8	Goody's Headache Powder 500	Bobby Hamilton	Bobby Hamilton	Bobby Hamilton	Chevrolet
9	DieHard 500	Bobby Labonte	Terry Labonte	Bobby Labonte	Pontiac
10	California 500 pres. by NAPA	Jeff Gordon	Mark Martin	Mark Martin	Ford
	No Bull 25 Race 1	Jeremy Mayfield	Jeremy Mayfield	Jeremy Mayfield	Ford
	No Bull 25 Race 2	Joe Nemechek	Jimmy Spencer	Jimmy Spencer	Ford
	Winston Open	Jeremy Mayfield	Jeremy Mayfield	Jeremy Mayfield	Ford
	The Winston	Bill Elliott	Jeff Gordon	Mark Martin	Ford
11	Coca-Cola 600	Jeff Gordon	Mark Martin	Jeff Gordon	Chevrolet
12	MBNA Platinum 400	Rusty Wallace	Jeff Gordon	Dale Jarrett	Ford
13	Pontiac Excitement 400	Jeff Gordon	Dale Jarrett	Terry Labonte	Chevrolet
14	Miller Lite 400	Ward Burton	Jeff Gordon	Mark Martin	Ford
15	Pocono 500	Jeff Gordon	Jeremy Mayfield	Jeremy Mayfield	Ford
16	Save Mart/Kragen 350	Jeff Gordon	Jeff Gordon	Jeff Gordon	Chevrolet
17	Jiffy Lube 300	Ricky Craven	Jeff Burton	Jeff Burton	Ford
18	Pennsylvania 500	Ward Burton	Jeff Gordon	Jeff Gordon	Chevrolet
19	Brickyard 400	Ernie Irvan	Jeff Gordon	Jeff Gordon	Chevrolet
20	The Bud at The Glen	Jeff Gordon	Jeff Gordon	Jeff Gordon	Chevrolet
21	Pepsi 400 pres. by DeVilbiss	Ernie Irvan	Ernie Irvan	Jeff Gordon	Chevrolet
22	Goody's Headache Powder 500	Rusty Wallace	Mark Martin	Mark Martin	Ford
23	Farm Aid on CMT 300	Jeff Gordon	Mark Martin	Jeff Gordon	Chevrolet
24	Pepsi Southern 500	Dale Jarrett	Jeff Burton	Jeff Gordon	Chevrolet
25	Exide NASCAR Select Batteries 400	Rusty Wallace	Jeff Burton	Jeff Burton	Ford
26	MBNA Gold 400	Mark Martin	Mark Martin	Mark Martin	Ford
27	NAPA Autocare 500	Ernie Irvan	Sterling Marlin	Ricky Rudd	Ford
28	UAW-GM Quality 500	Derrike Cope	Mark Martin	Mark Martin	Ford
29	Winston 500	Ken Schrader	Mike Skinner	Dale Jarrett	Ford
30	Pepsi 400	Bobby Labonte	Jeff Gordon	Jeff Gordon	Chevrolet
31	Dura Lube/Kmart 500	Ken Schrader	Rusty Wallace	Rusty Wallace	Ford
32	AC Delco 400	Mark Martin	Dale Jarrett	Jeff Gordon	Chevrolet
33	NAPA 500	Kenny Irwin Jr.	Jeff Gordon	Jeff Gordon	Chevrolet

=== Bud Shootout Qualifier ===
The Bud Shootout Qualifier, a race for the fastest second round qualifier, from each race from the previous season, was run on February 8 in Daytona Beach, Florida. Sterling Marlin drew the pole. The race was broadcast on ESPN.

Top Ten Results

1. #23 - Jimmy Spencer
2. #9 - Lake Speed
3. #3 - Dale Earnhardt
4. #40 - Sterling Marlin
5. #11 - Brett Bodine
6. #97 - Chad Little
7. #75 - Rick Mast
8. #29 - Jeff Green
9. #98 - Greg Sacks
10. #17 - Darrell Waltrip

=== Bud Shootout ===
The Bud Shootout, a race for pole winners from the previous season, was run on February 8 in Daytona Beach, Florida. Mark Martin drew the pole. The race was broadcast on CBS.

Top Ten Results

1. #2 - Rusty Wallace
2. #81 - Kenny Wallace
3. #94 - Bill Elliott
4. #23 - Jimmy Spencer
5. #33 - Ken Schrader
6. #7 - Geoff Bodine
7. #36 - Ernie Irvan
8. #6 - Mark Martin
9. #43 - John Andretti
10. #35 - Todd Bodine

=== Gatorade 125s ===
Race One: Top Ten Results

The Gatorade Twin 125s were run on February 12 in Daytona Beach, Florida. Bobby and Terry Labonte were the pole-sitters, for both races, respectively. The races were broadcast tape delayed on CBS prior to the Daytona 500.

1. #40 - Sterling Marlin
2. #88 - Dale Jarrett
3. #18 - Bobby Labonte
4. #23 - Jimmy Spencer
5. #22 - Ward Burton
6. #30 - Derrike Cope
7. #12 - Jeremy Mayfield
8. #6 - Mark Martin
9. #43 - John Andretti
10. #94 - Bill Elliott
- Ken Schrader suffered a broken sternum in a hard crash with Johnny Benson on the last lap of Duel 1. He raced in the 500 using his car from the Bud Shootout while wearing a bull rider's vest.

Race Two: Top Ten Results

1. #3 - Dale Earnhardt
2. #21 - Michael Waltrip
3. #31 - Mike Skinner
4. #36 - Ernie Irvan
5. #2 - Rusty Wallace
6. #99 - Jeff Burton
7. #9 - Lake Speed
8. #95 - Andy Hillenburg
9. #91 - Kevin Lepage
10. #4 - Bobby Hamilton

=== 40th Daytona 500 ===
The Daytona 500 was run on February 15 in Daytona Beach, Florida. The Labonte brothers shared the front row with Bobby Labonte on the pole, and brother Terry Labonte starting second. The race was broadcast on CBS.

Top Ten Results

1. #3 - Dale Earnhardt
2. #18 - Bobby Labonte
3. #12 - Jeremy Mayfield
4. #33 - Ken Schrader
5. #2 - Rusty Wallace
6. #36 - Ernie Irvan
7. #97 - Chad Little
8. #31 - Mike Skinner
9. #21 - Michael Waltrip
10. #94 - Bill Elliott

Failed to qualify: #07 - Dan Pardus, #8 - Hut Stricklin, #14 - Loy Allen Jr., #26 - Johnny Benson, #29 - Jeff Green, #35 - Todd Bodine, #46 - Wally Dallenbach Jr., #59 - Mark Gibson, #78 - Gary Bradberry, #79 - Norm Benning, #80 - Michael Ciochetti, #81 - Kenny Wallace, #85 - Randy Renfrow, #96 - David Green

- In his 20th Daytona 500 start, Dale Earnhardt finally scored his long-awaited first Daytona 500 victory. This victory also snapped a 59-race winless streak dating back to the spring of 1996.
- Dale dedicated the win to his late friend and colleague, Neil Bonnett, who died in a practice crash for the 1994 race.
- "20 years of trying, 20 years of frustration. Dale Earnhardt will come to the caution flag to win the Daytona 500! Finally!" - Mike Joy talking as Earnhardt came to the white flag and the caution flag, giving him his first (and only) Daytona 500 victory.
- This would be the first time since 1996, and the last time in his career, that Dale Earnhardt would leave an event as the points leader.

=== GM Goodwrench Service Plus 400 ===
The GM Goodwrench Service Plus 400 was run on February 22 in Rockingham, North Carolina. Rick Mast won the pole. The race was broadcast on TNN.

Top Ten Results

1. #24 - Jeff Gordon
2. #2 - Rusty Wallace
3. #6 - Mark Martin
4. #23 - Jimmy Spencer
5. #7 - Geoff Bodine
6. #94 - Bill Elliott
7. #88 - Dale Jarrett
8. #5 - Terry Labonte
9. #4 - Bobby Hamilton
10. #50 - Ricky Craven

Failed to qualify: #05 - Morgan Shepherd, #35 - Todd Bodine, #46 - Wally Dallenbach Jr., #71 - Dave Marcis, #78 - Gary Bradberry, #91 - Kevin Lepage

=== Las Vegas 400 ===
The inaugural Las Vegas 400 was run on March 1 at Las Vegas Motor Speedway in Las Vegas, Nevada. The No. 88 of Dale Jarrett won the pole. The race was broadcast on ABC.

Top Ten Results

1. #6 - Mark Martin*
2. #99 - Jeff Burton
3. #2 - Rusty Wallace
4. #26 - Johnny Benson
5. #12 - Jeremy Mayfield
6. #16 - Ted Musgrave
7. #23 - Jimmy Spencer
8. #3 - Dale Earnhardt*
9. #94 - Bill Elliott
10. #97 - Chad Little

Failed to qualify: #1 - Steve Park, #13 - Jerry Nadeau, #19 - Tony Raines, #35 - Todd Bodine, #37 - Larry Gunselman, #38 - Butch Gilliland, #71 - Dave Marcis, #78 - Gary Bradberry

- Martin's win was the first Cup Series victory for the Ford Taurus.
- Nine of the top-10 finishers were Fords, with the only exception being 8th place finisher Dale Earnhardt, driving a Chevrolet.
- Additionally, all 5 of the Roush Racing cars finished in the Top 10 (in addition to Martin and Burton with the top 2 positions; Johnny Benson finished 4th, Ted Musgrave finished 6th and Chad Little finished 10th).

=== Primestar 500 ===
The Primestar 500 was scheduled to run on March 8 at Atlanta Motor Speedway in Hampton, Georgia, but was run on March 9 due to rain. The No. 43 of John Andretti won the pole. The race was supposed to be broadcast on ABC, but due to the washout, the broadcast was moved to ESPN.

Top Ten Results

1. #18 - Bobby Labonte
2. #88 - Dale Jarrett
3. #12 - Jeremy Mayfield
4. #2 - Rusty Wallace
5. #28 - Kenny Irwin Jr.
6. #90 - Dick Trickle
7. #81 - Kenny Wallace
8. #99 - Jeff Burton
9. #26 - Johnny Benson
10. #35 - Todd Bodine

Failed to qualify: #05 - Morgan Shepherd, #1 - Steve Park/Phil Parsons*, #29 - Jeff Green, #40 - Sterling Marlin*, #71 - Dave Marcis, #95 - Andy Hillenburg, #97 - Chad Little

- Steve Park suffered a broken leg in a hard crash during a Saturday morning practice session before 2nd round qualifying. This crash put Park out of the #1 until August. Phil Parsons was tapped to replace Park on a temporary basis, with Darrell Waltrip being chosen to fill in soon after.
- After Sterling Marlin unexpectedly failed to qualify, Coors Light decals were placed on the #91 of Kevin Lepage for the race.

=== TranSouth Financial 400 ===
The TranSouth Financial 400 was run on March 22 in Darlington, South Carolina. Mark Martin won the pole. The race was broadcast on ESPN.

Top Ten Results

1. #88 - Dale Jarrett
2. #24 - Jeff Gordon
3. #2 - Rusty Wallace
4. #12 - Jeremy Mayfield
5. #99 - Jeff Burton
6. #5 - Terry Labonte
7. #6 - Mark Martin
8. #26 - Johnny Benson
9. #81 - Kenny Wallace
10. #16 - Ted Musgrave

Failed to qualify: #05 - Morgan Shepherd, #1 - Ron Hornaday Jr., #8 - Hut Stricklin, #46 - Wally Dallenbach Jr., #71 - Dave Marcis, #78 - Gary Bradberry

- Before this race, Ricky Craven was diagnosed with post-concussion syndrome, Randy LaJoie was tapped to sub for Craven in the #50 Chevrolet. LaJoie ended up finishing 38th, 9 laps down as he encountered problems during the race.
- Darrell Waltrip showed up to the track with a special #300 car as a tribute to NASCAR legend Tim Flock, who was dying from cancer. The car was named "Tim Flock Special" and was based on Flock's car from 1955. Due to NASCAR prohibiting three digit numbers from competing, Waltrip used his familiar #17. Flock would pass away on March 31, eleven days after this race.
- This would also be Waltrip's final race as an owner/driver, as he would sell the team to Tyler Jet Motorsports after this race.

=== Food City 500 ===
The Food City 500 was run on March 29 at Bristol Motor Speedway in Bristol, Tennessee. Rusty Wallace won the pole. The race was broadcast on ESPN.

Top Ten Results

1. #24 - Jeff Gordon
2. #5 - Terry Labonte
3. #88 - Dale Jarrett
4. #99 - Jeff Burton
5. #26 - Johnny Benson
6. #33 - Ken Schrader
7. #6 - Mark Martin
8. #16 - Ted Musgrave
9. #21 - Michael Waltrip
10. #50 - Randy LaJoie

Failed to qualify: #29 - Jeff Green, #42 - Joe Nemechek, #71 - Dave Marcis, #78 - Gary Bradberry

=== Texas 500 ===
The Texas 500 was run on April 5 in Fort Worth, Texas. Jeremy Mayfield won the pole. The race was broadcast on CBS.

Top Ten Results

1. #6 - Mark Martin
2. #97 - Chad Little
3. #77 - Robert Pressley
4. #42 - Joe Nemechek
5. #26 - Johnny Benson
6. #5 - Terry Labonte
7. #23 - Jimmy Spencer
8. #18 - Bobby Labonte
9. #21 - Michael Waltrip
10. #41 - Steve Grissom

Failed to qualify: #13 - Jerry Nadeau, #30 - Derrike Cope, #35 - Todd Bodine, #47 - Billy Standridge, #95 - Andy Hillenburg

- The green flag was waved by Jim Roper, who won the very first NASCAR Strictly Stock race in 1949.
- On lap 2, there was a multi-car pileup in turn 1 that involved at least 9 cars. This was very similar to the start of the previous year's race.
- Journeyman Greg Sacks suffered near-fatal head injuries in a lap 137 crash, forcing him to sit out for the remainder of the 1998 season. Rich Bickle, would drive Sacks' #98 for the rest of the year. The crash effectively ended Sacks' full-time career, as he would only race sparingly in NASCAR and ARCA afterwards.
- Mike Skinner was also injured in a hard crash into the wall on lap 252, and would sit out the next 3 races. Morgan Shepherd drove the #31 car for Martinsville and Talladega, while Mike Dillon drove the car at California.

=== Goody's Headache Powder 500 (Martinsville) ===
The Goody's Headache Powder 500 was scheduled to run on April 19 in Martinsville, Virginia, but was run on April 20 due to rain. Bobby Hamilton won the pole. The race was broadcast on ESPN.

Top Ten Results

1. #4 - Bobby Hamilton*
2. #16 - Ted Musgrave
3. #88 - Dale Jarrett
4. #3 - Dale Earnhardt
5. #50 - Randy LaJoie
6. #2 - Rusty Wallace
7. #12 - Jeremy Mayfield
8. #24 - Jeff Gordon
9. #36 - Ernie Irvan
10. #33 - Ken Schrader

Failed to qualify: #46 - Wally Dallenbach Jr., #71 - Dave Marcis, #78 - Gary Bradberry

- Bobby Hamilton led 378 of the race's 500 laps on his way to a dominant victory.
- This would be the last Cup Series victory for Morgan McClure Motorsports.

=== DieHard 500 ===
The DieHard 500 was run on April 26 in Talladega, Alabama. Bobby Labonte won the pole and went on to win the race. The race was broadcast on ABC.

Top Ten Results

1. #18 - Bobby Labonte
2. #23 - Jimmy Spencer
3. #88 - Dale Jarrett
4. #5 - Terry Labonte
5. #24 - Jeff Gordon
6. #36 - Ernie Irvan
7. #81 - Kenny Wallace
8. #22 - Ward Burton
9. #40 - Sterling Marlin
10. #50 - Randy LaJoie

Failed to qualify: #07 - Dan Pardus, #7 - Geoff Bodine, #8 - Hut Stricklin, #29 - Jeff Green, #35 - Todd Bodine, #60 - Matt Kenseth*, #61 - Bob Strait, #78 - Gary Bradberry, #98 - Rich Bickle

- The race was marred by "The Big One" on lap 141, collecting Dale Earnhardt, Bill Elliott and 18 others.
- Earnhardt's #3 Chevy was repaired, but Earnhardt was unable to drive due to suffering burns in the accident. Kyle Petty, whose #44 Pontiac was totaled in the wreck, drove Earnhardt's car for a few laps to gain track position before parking it.
- Matt Kenseth's #60 Ford was a 6th Roush Racing entry.
- This would be Kenseth's only Cup Series DNQ.

=== California 500 presented by NAPA ===
The California 500 was run on May 3 in Fontana, California. Jeff Gordon won the pole. The race was broadcast on ESPN.

Top Ten Results

1. #6 - Mark Martin
2. #12 - Jeremy Mayfield
3. #5 - Terry Labonte
4. #24 - Jeff Gordon
5. #1 - Darrell Waltrip
6. #97 - Chad Little
7. #7 - Geoff Bodine
8. #26 - Johnny Benson
9. #3 - Dale Earnhardt
10. #99 - Jeff Burton

Failed to qualify: #8 - Hut Stricklin, #19 - Tony Raines, #71 - Dave Marcis, #98 - Rich Bickle

- Mike Dillon made his only career Cup Series start in this race, driving the #31 for father-in-law Richard Childress in place of Mike Skinner. Dillon also participated in was the previous year's Southern 500 as a relief driver for Dale Earnhardt.

=== The Winston ===
The Winston, a non-points race with seventy laps in three segments, was run on May 16 in Concord, North Carolina at Charlotte Motor Speedway. Bill Elliott won the pole. The race was broadcast on TNN.

Top Ten Results

1. #6 - Mark Martin
2. #18 - Bobby Labonte
3. #88 - Dale Jarrett
4. #99 - Jeff Burton
5. #2 - Rusty Wallace
6. #40 - Sterling Marlin
7. #94 - Bill Elliott
8. #7 - Geoff Bodine
9. #4 - Bobby Hamilton
10. #98 - Rich Bickle
- Jeff Gordon dominated the race, but ran out of gas on the last lap, handing the victory to Martin.

=== Coca-Cola 600 ===
The Coca-Cola 600 was run on May 24 in Concord, North Carolina. Jeff Gordon won the pole. The race was broadcast on TBS.

Top Ten Results

1. #24 - Jeff Gordon
2. #2 - Rusty Wallace
3. #18 - Bobby Labonte
4. #6 - Mark Martin
5. #88 - Dale Jarrett
6. #42 - Joe Nemechek
7. #43 - John Andretti
8. #99 - Jeff Burton
9. #26 - Johnny Benson
10. #33 - Ken Schrader

Failed to qualify: #07 - Dan Pardus, #8 - Hut Stricklin, #28 - Kenny Irwin Jr., #46 - Morgan Shepherd, #47 - Billy Standridge, #71 - Dave Marcis, #85 - Randy MacDonald, #95 - Andy Hillenburg

- Bill Elliott had Jeff Green relieve him midway through the race after hard accidents at Talladega and California.
- Elliott Sadler made his Cup Series debut in this race, driving the #92 Chevrolet for Diamond Ridge Motorsports. Sadler blew an engine and finished 42nd after starting 31st.

=== MBNA Platinum 400 ===
The MBNA Platinum 400 was run on May 31, Dover, Delaware. Rusty Wallace won the pole. The race was broadcast on TNN.

Top Ten Results

1. #88 - Dale Jarrett
2. #99 - Jeff Burton
3. #24 - Jeff Gordon
4. #18 - Bobby Labonte
5. #12 - Jeremy Mayfield
6. #10 - Ricky Rudd
7. #6 - Mark Martin
8. #8 - Buckshot Jones*
9. #36 - Ernie Irvan
10. #5 - Terry Labonte

Failed to qualify: #13 - Dennis Setzer, #35 - Todd Bodine, #46 - Morgan Shepherd

- This was Buckshot Jones' only career Top 10 finish in the Winston Cup Series, in only his 2nd career start.

=== Pontiac Excitement 400 ===
The Pontiac Excitement 400 was run on June 6 in Richmond, Virginia. Jeff Gordon won the pole. The race was broadcast on ESPN.

Top Ten Results

1. #5 - Terry Labonte
2. #88 - Dale Jarrett
3. #2 - Rusty Wallace
4. #33 - Ken Schrader
5. #6 - Mark Martin
6. #12 - Jeremy Mayfield
7. #99 - Jeff Burton
8. #18 - Bobby Labonte
9. #28 - Kenny Irwin Jr.
10. #40 - Sterling Marlin

Failed to qualify: #8 - Buckshot Jones, #91 - Kevin Lepage

- Jeff Gordon crashed out of the lead on lap 370 after contact with Rusty Wallace, and finished 37th. It would be Gordon's second DNF of 1998.
- This would be Gordon's final finish outside the top-10 in 1998, as he would score top-10s in all 20 remaining Cup races, including 17 consecutive top-5s, which both stand as All-Time NASCAR records as of 2021. He would also score 10 victories in this stretch.
- This race was notable as it was the first time that NASCAR decided to red flag a race with under 10 laps to go in order to ensure a green flag finish. This did allow for a final restart, but the race still ended under caution.
- This was Dale Earnhardt's final race with Larry McReynolds as his crew chief after 45 races together and 1 win, as owner Richard Childress swapped McReynolds with Mike Skinner's crew chief Kevin Hamlin. Both drivers saw better performances after the swap.

=== Miller Lite 400 ===
The Miller Lite 400 was run on June 14 in Brooklyn, Michigan. Ward Burton won the pole. The race was broadcast on CBS.

Top Ten Results

1. #6 - Mark Martin
2. #88 - Dale Jarrett
3. #24 - Jeff Gordon
4. #99 - Jeff Burton
5. #12 - Jeremy Mayfield
6. #94 - Bill Elliott
7. #18 - Bobby Labonte
8. #22 - Ward Burton
9. #42 - Joe Nemechek
10. #50 - Wally Dallenbach Jr.*

Failed to qualify: #19 - Tony Raines, #30 - Derrike Cope, #35 - Todd Bodine, #71 - Dave Marcis

- Wally Dallenbach Jr. drove the #50 Chevrolet in place of Randy LaJoie, who was competing in the Busch Grand National race at Pikes Peak in Colorado.

=== Pocono 500 ===
The Pocono 500 was run on June 21 in Long Pond, Pennsylvania. Jeff Gordon won the pole. The race was broadcast on TNN.

Top Ten Results

1. #12 - Jeremy Mayfield*
2. #24 - Jeff Gordon
3. #88 - Dale Jarrett
4. #99 - Jeff Burton
5. #6 - Mark Martin
6. #1 - Darrell Waltrip*
7. #50 - Wally Dallenbach Jr.
8. #3 - Dale Earnhardt
9. #40 - Sterling Marlin
10. #23 - Jimmy Spencer

Failed to qualify: #00 - Buckshot Jones, #71 - Dave Marcis

- This was Jeremy Mayfield's 1st career Winston Cup victory.
- This was Darrell Waltrip's final career top-5 in the Cup Series.
- The race was interrupted by a 71-minute red flag for rain.

=== Save Mart/Kragen 350 ===
The Save Mart/Kragen 350 was run on June 28 in Sonoma, California. Jeff Gordon won the pole. The race was broadcast on ESPN.

Top Ten Results

1. #24 - Jeff Gordon*
2. #4 - Bobby Hamilton
3. #43 - John Andretti
4. #18 - Bobby Labonte
5. #2 - Rusty Wallace
6. #6 - Mark Martin
7. #40 - Sterling Marlin
8. #75 - Rick Mast
9. #28 - Kenny Irwin Jr.
10. #41 - Steve Grissom

Failed to qualify: #35 - Todd Bodine, #46 - Tommy Kendall*, #58 - Chris Raudman, #70 - Rick Ware, #71 - Dave Marcis

- Due to ESPN's coverage of the final round of the Senior PGA Tour NFL Golf Classic running long, ESPN2 carried the start of the race. ESPN joined the race in progress on lap 3.
- During the weekend, Kevin Lepage signed a contract with Roush Racing to replace Ted Musgrave in the #16 Ford after Watkins Glen. After learning of the deal, Lepage was dropped by LJ Racing after 2nd round qualifying. The car still made the field in 42nd starting spot through a provisional. Tommy Kendall was tapped to drive the car in the race and finished 16th.
- Rookie Jerry Nadeau got anxious on the start. Starting on the outside pole, Nadeau tried to beat polesitter Jeff Gordon to Turn 2, but went into Turn 1 too fast and drove off course. By the time he had fully recovered the car, he had dropped to 5th. The off course excursion caused problems with Nadeau's brakes and tires to develop, which resulted in Nadeau crashing in the esses on lap 15, which put him out of the race in last place.
- Lake Speed suffered rib and sternum injuries in a practice crash in Turn 10. The injuries were serious enough for Speed to have to sit out the race. Winston West regular Butch Gilliland drove the #9 Ford to a 24th-place finish from 40th on the grid in place of Speed.
- After Jeremy Mayfield had troubles in this race. Jeff Gordon would take over the Winston Cup points lead, and would hold it for the rest of the year.

=== Jiffy Lube 300 ===
The Jiffy Lube 300 was run on July 12 in Loudon, New Hampshire. Ricky Craven won the pole in his return to the No. 50 after missing the previous 13 races. The race was broadcast on TNN.

Top Ten Results

1. #99 - Jeff Burton
2. #6 - Mark Martin
3. #24 - Jeff Gordon
4. #2 - Rusty Wallace
5. #31 - Mike Skinner
6. #43 - John Andretti
7. #88 - Dale Jarrett
8. #44 - Kyle Petty
9. #33 - Ken Schrader
10. #81 - Kenny Wallace

Failed to qualify: #71 - Dave Marcis

- Lake Speed made his final career start in this race, whose aggravated rib and sternum injuries during the race led to his retirement. Speed's original injuries came from a practice crash he suffered in the previous race at Sears Point.

=== Pennsylvania 500 ===
The Pennsylvania 500 was run on July 26 in Long Pond, Pennsylvania. Ward Burton won the pole. The race was broadcast on TBS.

Top Ten Results

1. #24 - Jeff Gordon
2. #6 - Mark Martin
3. #99 - Jeff Burton
4. #18 - Bobby Labonte
5. #88 - Dale Jarrett
6. #2 - Rusty Wallace
7. #3 - Dale Earnhardt
8. #33 - Ken Schrader
9. #36 - Ernie Irvan
10. #21 - Michael Waltrip

Failed to qualify: #35 - Jimmy Horton, #78 - Gary Bradberry, #79 - Randy MacDonald

- After the previous Sunday's race at Loudon, Jerry Nadeau was fired from the #13 Ford. He immediately signed with Melling Racing to replace Lake Speed in the #9 Ford. Nadeau finished 26th, 2 laps down.
- Elliott-Marino Racing tapped Wally Dallenbach Jr. to drive the #13 Ford on an interim basis starting at Pocono. Dallenbach finished 25th, 2 laps down. after starting 42nd (with a provisional).
- Morgan Shepherd was tapped to drive the #91 LJ Racing Chevrolet starting at Pocono. Shepherd qualified a strong 7th, but collided with the turn 1 wall on lap 71 and finished 40th.

=== Brickyard 400 ===
The Brickyard 400 was run on August 1 in Speedway, Indiana. Ernie Irvan won the pole. The race was broadcast on ABC.

Top Ten Results

1. #24 - Jeff Gordon
2. #6 - Mark Martin
3. #18 - Bobby Labonte
4. #31 - Mike Skinner
5. #3 - Dale Earnhardt
6. #36 - Ernie Irvan
7. #43 - John Andretti
8. #2 - Rusty Wallace
9. #5 - Terry Labonte
10. #33 - Ken Schrader

Failed to qualify: #07 - Dan Pardus, #14 - Lance Hooper*, #15 - Loy Allen Jr., #19 - Robby Gordon, #30 - Derrike Cope, #78 - Gary Bradberry, #95 - Randy MacDonald, #96 - Hut Stricklin

- Jimmy Spencer suffered a concussion in a late-race crash. This forced Spencer to seek relief from Boris Said the next weekend at Watkins Glen, before completely sitting out the following two races.
- Jeremy Mayfield crashed early in the race coming out of Turn 1. He seemed fine after the wreck, but at Watkins Glen the next weekend, he suffered fainting spells and had Larry Gunselman on standby, but did not take relief during the race.
- This was the last Cup race attempted by Precision Products Racing, as car owner Richard Jackson withdrew the #14 car driven by Lance Hooper before qualifying began due to lack of sponsorship.
- Steve Park returned to Winston Cup racing for the first time since his accident at Atlanta back in March.
- Jeff Gordon had become the first driver to win the Brickyard 400 twice, and he won the No Bull 5 Million Dollar Bonus.

=== The Bud at The Glen ===
The Bud at The Glen was run on August 9 at Watkins Glen International in Watkins Glen, New York. Jeff Gordon won the pole. The race was broadcast on ESPN.

Top Ten Results

1. #24 - Jeff Gordon
2. #6 - Mark Martin*
3. #31 - Mike Skinner
4. #2 - Rusty Wallace
5. #88 - Dale Jarrett
6. #44 - Kyle Petty
7. #40 - Sterling Marlin
8. #43 - John Andretti
9. #26 - Johnny Benson
10. #18 - Bobby Labonte

Failed to qualify: #58 - Larry Gunselman, #59 - Brian Cunningham, #71 - Dave Marcis

- Jimmy Spencer was relieved during the race by Boris Said, as Spencer needed to recover from the concussion he suffered at Indianapolis.
- Dick Trickle was relieved during the race by Busch North and Featherlite Modified driver Ted Christopher. According to the ESPN telecast, this was because of Trickle's apparent lack of skill and confidence in his road racing abilities.
- This was Mark Martin's fourth consecutive 2nd-place finish, and his 3rd to Jeff Gordon, losing 30 points to him in the standings over those 3 races.
- This was the last Cup race sponsored by a beer company.
- Ron Fellows was the first road course ringer to qualify on the front row since Dan Gurney in 1970 at Riverside Raceway. In honor of his achievement, as well as the Canadian fans who watched the race, the Canadian National Anthem was recited along with the Star-Spangled Banner during pre-race ceremonies.
- This race was held the day after Mark Martin's father, stepmother and half-sister were killed in a plane crash in Nevada.

=== Pepsi 400 presented by DeVilbiss ===
The Pepsi 400 presented by DeVilbiss was run on August 16 in Brooklyn, Michigan. Ernie Irvan won the pole. The race was broadcast on ESPN.

Top Ten Results

1. #24 - Jeff Gordon*
2. #18 - Bobby Labonte
3. #88 - Dale Jarrett
4. #6 - Mark Martin
5. #99 - Jeff Burton
6. #36 - Ernie Irvan
7. #12 - Jeremy Mayfield
8. #50 - Wally Dallenbach Jr.*
9. #43 - John Andretti
10. #97 - Chad Little

Failed to qualify: #71 - Dave Marcis, #78 - Gary Bradberry, #81 - Kenny Wallace, #96 - Hut Stricklin

- Wally Dallenbach Jr. was hired to drive the #50 Chevrolet for the rest of the season, and all of 1999 at this point.
- ARCA driver Frank Kimmel subbed for Jimmy Spencer for this race, as Spencer was still recovering from a concussion suffered at Indianapolis.
- This was Jeff Gordon's 4th consecutive Cup victory, tying the Modern-era record. Gordon would be the last driver to accomplish this feat until Jimmie Johnson in 2007.

=== Goody's Headache Powder 500 (Bristol) ===
The Goody's Headache Powder 500 was run on August 22 in Bristol, Tennessee. Rusty Wallace won the pole. The race was broadcast on ESPN.

Top Ten Results

1. #6 - Mark Martin*
2. #99 - Jeff Burton
3. #2 - Rusty Wallace
4. #88 - Dale Jarrett
5. #24 - Jeff Gordon
6. #3 - Dale Earnhardt
7. #31 - Mike Skinner
8. #12 - Jeremy Mayfield
9. #10 - Ricky Rudd
10. #16 - Kevin Lepage

Failed to qualify: #41 - Steve Grissom, #71 - Dave Marcis, #78 - Gary Bradberry, #85 - Ken Bouchard

- Mark Martin prevented Jeff Gordon from scoring the elusive 5th straight victory, a feat that has never been done in NASCAR's modern era.
- Ted Musgrave subbed for Jimmy Spencer in the #23 Ford for Travis Carter Enterprises. Spencer was still recovering from the concussion that he suffered at the Brickyard 400.

=== Farm Aid on CMT 300 ===
The Farm Aid on CMT 300 was run on August 30 in Loudon, New Hampshire. Jeff Gordon won the pole. The race was broadcast on TNN.

Top Ten Results

1. #24 - Jeff Gordon*
2. #6 - Mark Martin
3. #43 - John Andretti
4. #88 - Dale Jarrett
5. #99 - Jeff Burton
6. #81 - Kenny Wallace
7. #18 - Bobby Labonte
8. #2 - Rusty Wallace
9. #3 - Dale Earnhardt
10. #10 - Ricky Rudd

Failed to qualify: #00 - Buckshot Jones, #07 - Dan Pardus, #30 - Derrike Cope, #79 - Ken Bouchard

- This race marked the beginning of "Tiregate." Jeff Gordon won both Michigan on and New Hampshire on August 30 after making two-tire final pit stops and pulling away from the pack. Team owner Jack Roush accused Gordon and his team of cheating by applying chemical solvents to their tires. NASCAR officials began an investigation by sealing off Gordon's pit stall and confiscating several sets of tires for testing. Gordon and his team were later acquitted of any wrongdoing prior to the start of the Exide NASCAR Select Batteries 400 at Richmond.
- Road racer Ron Fellows drove the #96 Chevy for American Equipment Racing in this race, starting 42nd and finishing 36th. It was Fellows' only Winston Cup start on an oval track.

=== Pepsi Southern 500 ===
The Pepsi Southern 500 was run on September 6 in Darlington, South Carolina. Dale Jarrett won the pole. The race was broadcast on ESPN.

Top Ten Results

1. #24 - Jeff Gordon*
2. #99 - Jeff Burton
3. #88 - Dale Jarrett
4. #3 - Dale Earnhardt
5. #12 - Jeremy Mayfield 1 lap down
6. #36 - Ernie Irvan 2 laps down
7. #2 - Rusty Wallace 2 laps down
8. #40 - Sterling Marlin 2 laps down
9. #7 - Geoff Bodine 3 laps down
10. #81 - Kenny Wallace 3 laps down

Failed to qualify: #71 - Dave Marcis, #91 - Morgan Shepherd, #96 - Hut Stricklin

- This race was part of the Winston No Bull 5 program. Jeff Gordon won the last such race, making him eligible to win a million dollars in this race if he pulled off a win.
- This was Jeff Gordon's 7th win in the last 9 races.
- This was Gordon's fourth consecutive Southern 500 victory, the only driver in NASCAR history to accomplish this feat.
- This was Gordon's 10th victory of 1998, making this the third consecutive year that Gordon won 10+ races in a season, a NASCAR modern era record.
- This would be the last time until Jimmie Johnson in 2007 that a driver would win 10 races in a season.

=== Exide NASCAR Select Batteries 400 ===
The Exide NASCAR Select Batteries 400 was run on September 12 in Richmond, Virginia. Rusty Wallace won the pole. The race was broadcast on ESPN.

Top Ten Results

1. #99 - Jeff Burton
2. #24 - Jeff Gordon
3. #6 - Mark Martin
4. #33 - Ken Schrader*
5. #43 - John Andretti
6. #4 - Bobby Hamilton
7. #2 - Rusty Wallace
8. #31 - Mike Skinner
9. #23 - Jimmy Spencer
10. #28 - Kenny Irwin Jr.

Failed to qualify: #00 - Buckshot Jones, #78 - Gary Bradberry, #79 - Ken Bouchard, #98 - Rich Bickle

- Jeff Burton would edge Jeff Gordon in an exciting side by side finish to take the win.
- Robert Pressley suffered a broken scapula in a crash early on, and would be forced to sit out the next two races.

=== MBNA Gold 400 ===
The MBNA Gold 400 was run on September 20 in Dover, Delaware. Mark Martin won the pole. The race was broadcast on TNN.

Top Ten Results

1. #6 - Mark Martin
2. #24 - Jeff Gordon
3. #12 - Jeremy Mayfield
4. #18 - Bobby Labonte
5. #2 - Rusty Wallace
6. #94 - Matt Kenseth*
7. #88 - Dale Jarrett
8. #36 - Ernie Irvan
9. #43 - John Andretti
10. #4 - Bobby Hamilton 1 lap down

Failed to qualify: #41 - Steve Grissom, #71 - Dave Marcis, #96 - Morgan Shepherd

- Matt Kenseth made his Winston Cup debut in relief of Bill Elliott. Elliott decided to skip the race to mourn the death of his father, George.
- Kenseth's 6th-place finish was the 3rd highest finish for a driver in their Cup Series debut, beaten only by Terry Labonte's 4th-place in the 1978 Southern 500, and Rusty Wallace's 2nd-place in the fall Atlanta race in 1980.
- Dale Earnhardt and Terry Labonte both made their 600th career Winston Cup starts in this race.

=== NAPA Autocare 500 ===
The NAPA Autocare 500 was run on September 27 in Martinsville, Virginia. Ernie Irvan won the pole. The race was broadcast on ESPN.

Top Ten Results

1. #10 - Ricky Rudd*
2. #24 - Jeff Gordon
3. #6 - Mark Martin
4. #98 - Rich Bickle*
5. #99 - Jeff Burton
6. #5 - Terry Labonte
7. #94 - Bill Elliott
8. #36 - Ernie Irvan 1 lap down
9. #26 - Johnny Benson 1 lap down
10. #18 - Bobby Labonte 1 lap down

Failed to qualify: #41 - David Green, #78 - Gary Bradberry, #79 - Ken Bouchard, #85 - Randy MacDonald

- This race was run in oppressive heat and humidity. Multiple drivers required relief during the event. Jerry Nadeau was actually forced to pull off the track at one point because he needed relief, and there was no one available that could relieve him.
- Ricky Rudd's cooler box broke literally on lap one of the race, forcing him to race in over 130-degree temperatures. Hut Stricklin was on standby to relieve Rudd, but Rudd never got out of the car. In Victory Lane, Rudd had to be pulled out of the car and given first aid by paramedics.
- This was Rudd's only victory of 1998, continuing his streak of 16 straight race-winning Cup seasons. This would also be Rudd's last victory until Pocono in June 2001, and his last as an owner-driver.
- This was Rich Bickle's best career finish. Bickle broke down in tears during a post-race interview on ESPN.

=== UAW-GM Quality 500 ===
The UAW-GM Quality 500 was run on October 4 in Concord, North Carolina. Derrike Cope won the pole. The race was broadcast on TBS.

Top Ten Results

1. #6 - Mark Martin
2. #22 - Ward Burton
3. #99 - Jeff Burton
4. #4 - Bobby Hamilton
5. #24 - Jeff Gordon
6. #16 - Kevin Lepage
7. #42 - Joe Nemechek
8. #97 - Chad Little
9. #7 - Geoff Bodine
10. #23 - Jimmy Spencer

Failed to qualify: #19 - Tony Raines, #46 - Jeff Green, #71 - Dave Marcis, #80 - Andy Hillenburg, #85 - Randy MacDonald

- This race was red-flagged for nearly 2 hours due to a sewer main behind the backstretch breaking. As a result, raw sewage water streamed across the backstretch from underneath the outside wall.

=== Winston 500 ===
The Winston 500 was run on October 11 in Talladega, Alabama. Ken Schrader won the pole. The race was broadcast on ESPN.

Top Ten Results

1. #88 - Dale Jarrett*
2. #24 - Jeff Gordon
3. #5 - Terry Labonte
4. #23 - Jimmy Spencer
5. #12 - Jeremy Mayfield
6. #18 - Bobby Labonte
7. #31 - Mike Skinner
8. #97 - Chad Little
9. #21 - Michael Waltrip
10. #99 - Jeff Burton

Failed to qualify: #07 - Dan Pardus, #41 - Rick Wilson, #54 - Bobby Gerhart, #75 - Rick Mast, #78 - Gary Bradberry, #98 - Rich Bickle

- Winston No Bull 5 race: Dale Jarrett won an extra million dollars for winning this race and finishing in the top 5 in the Southern 500.
- Ernie Irvan was injured in a violent crash on lap 135. Irvan started the race at Daytona for points, but then sat out the remaining 3 races.
- 500th career start for Geoff Bodine.

=== Pepsi 400 ===
The Pepsi 400 was scheduled to run on July 4 in Daytona Beach, Florida, but was run on October 17 due to wildfires in the Daytona Beach area. Bobby Labonte sat on the Bud Pole. The race was broadcast on TNN.

Top Ten Results

1. #24 - Jeff Gordon*
2. #18 - Bobby Labonte
3. #31 - Mike Skinner
4. #12 - Jeremy Mayfield
5. #2 - Rusty Wallace
6. #5 - Terry Labonte
7. #22 - Ward Burton
8. #36 - Ernie Irvan*
9. #33 - Ken Schrader
10. #3 - Dale Earnhardt

Failed to qualify: #41 - Rick Wilson, #75 - Rick Mast, #77 - Robert Pressley, #78 - Gary Bradberry, #90 - Dick Trickle

- This was the first NASCAR race at Daytona to be run under the lights.
- 1998 was the first NASCAR season to have back-to-back points paying restrictor plate races, which would not happen again until 2024.
- This race was originally scheduled to be broadcast by CBS, but TNN broadcast the race due to prior commitments by CBS (due to the race's rescheduling).
- Ernie Irvan started the race in the #36, but was replaced at the first caution by Ricky Craven.
- This was Jeff Gordon's 40th Winston Cup Career win.
- The 11th win of 1998 for Jeff Gordon. This was the first time since Dale Earnhardt in 1987 that a driver won more than 10 races in a season.
- As of 2025, this is the last time that a driver won 11 races in a season.

=== Dura Lube/Kmart 500 ===
The Dura Lube/Kmart 500* was run on October 25 in Phoenix, Arizona. Ken Schrader won the pole. The race was broadcast on TNN.

Top Ten Results

1. #2 - Rusty Wallace
2. #6 - Mark Martin
3. #3 - Dale Earnhardt
4. #99 - Jeff Burton
5. #13 - Ted Musgrave
6. #43 - John Andretti
7. #24 - Jeff Gordon*
8. #81 - Kenny Wallace
9. #26 - Johnny Benson
10. #5 - Terry Labonte

Failed to qualify: #21 - Michael Waltrip, #45 - Jeff Ward, #71 - Dave Marcis

- This race was shortened to 257 laps due to rain.
- This race ended a string of 17 straight top-5 finishes for Jeff Gordon, which is a NASCAR record.

=== AC Delco 400 ===
The AC Delco 400 was run on November 1 in Rockingham, North Carolina. Mark Martin won the pole. The race was broadcast on TNN.

Top Ten Results

1. #24 - Jeff Gordon*
2. #88 - Dale Jarrett
3. #2 - Rusty Wallace
4. #6 - Mark Martin
5. #99 - Jeff Burton
6. #4 - Bobby Hamilton
7. #22 - Ward Burton
8. #5 - Terry Labonte
9. #3 - Dale Earnhardt
10. #10 - Ricky Rudd

Failed to qualify: #71 - Dave Marcis, #80 - Andy Hillenburg, #96 - Steve Grissom

- Jeff Gordon clinched his second consecutive Winston Cup Series championship when Rick Mast and Kevin Lepage were officially listed as out of the race, as Gordon needed to finish 40th or better to clinch the title, or 41st or better with at least one lap led.
- The 12th win of 1998 for Jeff Gordon. This was the first time since Darrell Waltrip in 1982 that a driver won 12 races in a season.

=== NAPA 500 ===
The NAPA 500 was run on November 8 in Hampton, Georgia. Kenny Irwin Jr. won his 1st career pole. The race was broadcast on ESPN.

Top Ten Results

1. #24 - Jeff Gordon*
2. #88 - Dale Jarrett
3. #6 - Mark Martin*
4. #99 - Jeff Burton
5. #91 - Todd Bodine*
6. #4 - Bobby Hamilton
7. #33 - Ken Schrader
8. #5 - Terry Labonte
9. #31 - Mike Skinner
10. #7 - Geoff Bodine

Failed to qualify: #08 - Harris DeVane, #75 - Rick Mast, #80 - Andy Hillenburg, #96 - Steve Grissom, 98 - Rich Bickle

- Twice during the race, the red flag was displayed, both times for rain. By the time the second red flag came out, midnight was approaching, and track officials felt obligated to get the fans home at a decent hour. So the race was called at 221 of the scheduled 325 laps.
- Todd Bodine's fifth-place finish was the best ever finish for LJ Racing in the Cup Series.
- Jeff Gordon's victory made him the second driver after Bobby Labonte to win on both of the configurations at Atlanta.
- Gordon's victory ensured Chevrolet the 1998 Manufacturers' Championship.
- This was Gordon's 13th victory of 1998, tying a NASCAR modern-era record with Richard Petty in 1975 for the most wins in a single season.
- Jeff Gordon scored a total of 5,328 points in 33 races throughout 1998, the most points scored in Bob Latford Winston Cup points system history.
- Mark Martin finished second in points for the third time in his career, tying James Hylton for the most runner-up points finishes for a driver to never win a championship.
- This was Gordon's 20th consecutive top-10 finish, a NASCAR record.
- Stavola Brothers Racing made its final career start in this race, with Morgan Shepherd starting 32nd before crashing out and finishing 39th.

=== NASCAR Thunder Special Motegi - Coca-Cola 500 ===
The NASCAR Thunder Special Motegi - Coca-Cola 500 was an exhibition race run on November 22 at the Twin Ring Motegi oval in Motegi, Tochigi, Japan. Jeremy Mayfield won the pole.

This is also the first NASCAR race where Dale Earnhardt and Dale Earnhardt Jr. competed with one another in the same race. The race was broadcast on TBS.

Top Ten Results

1. #31 - Mike Skinner
2. #24 - Jeff Gordon
3. #12 - Jeremy Mayfield
4. #99 - Jeff Burton
5. #2 - Rusty Wallace
6. #1 - Dale Earnhardt Jr.
7. #94 - Bill Elliott
8. #3 - Dale Earnhardt
9. #40 - Sterling Marlin
10. #21 - Michael Waltrip 2 laps down

Failed to qualify: None

- Dale Jarrett was forced to skip the event due to gallbladder surgery that needed to be performed immediately after the NAPA 500 so that he would be ready for Daytona in February. Darrell Waltrip drove the #88 in Jarrett's place.

== Final points standings ==
(key) Bold - Pole position awarded by time. Italics - Pole position set by owner's points standings. * – Most laps led.

Pos	Driver	DAY	CAR	LVS	ATL	DAR	BRI	TEX	MAR	TAL	CAL	CLT	DOV	RCH	MCH	POC	SON	NHA	POC	IND	GLN	MCH	BRI	NHA	DAR	RCH	DOV	MAR	CLT	TAL	DAY	PHO	CAR	ATL	Points
1	Jeff Gordon	16	1	17	19	2	1	31	8	5	**4**	**1**	3*	**37**	3*	**2**	**1***	3	1*	1*	**1***	1	5	**1**	1	2	2	2	5	2	1*	7	1	1*	5328
2	Mark Martin	38	3*	1*	25	**7**	7	1	29	23	1*	4*	7	5	1	5	6	2	2	2	2	4	1*	2*	40	3	**1***	3	1*	34	16	2	**4**	3	4964
3	Dale Jarrett	34	7	**40**	2	1	3	11	3	3	41	5	1	2*	2	3	15	7	5	16	5	3	4	4	**3**	16	7	42	24	1	23	32	2*	2	4619
4	Rusty Wallace	5	2	3	4	3	**33***	12	6	12	34	2	**18**	3	17	42	5	4	6	8	4	23	**3**	8	7	**7**	5	28	26	27	5	1*	3	20	4501
5	Jeff Burton	40	18	2	8	5*	4	29	32	43	10	8	2	7	4	4	39	1*	3	36	23	5	2	5	2*	1*	38	5	3	10	13	4	5	4	4415
6	Bobby Labonte	**2**	33	19	1	23	34	8	15	**1**	38	3	4	8	7	15	4	11	4	3	10	2	25	7	15	35	4	10	39	6	**2**	23	15	43	4180
7	Jeremy Mayfield	3	14	5	3	4	12	**23***	7	13	2	19	5	6	5	1*	18	30	18	42	31	7	8	20	5	22	3	23	25	5	4	42	29	15	4157
8	Dale Earnhardt	1*	17	8	13	12	22	35	4	36	9	39	25	21	15	8	11	18	7	5	11	18	6	9	4	38	23	22	29	32	10	3	9	13	3928
9	Terry Labonte	13	8	15	12	6	2	6	26	4*	3	41	10	1	19	12	42	14	31	9	40	36	13	39	25	21	18	6	38	3	6	10	8	8	3901
10	Bobby Hamilton	12	9	20	21	35	18	26	**1***	30	27	20	17	16	38	20	2	15	20	20	13	20	11	34	23	6	10	14	4	15	21	21	6	6	3786
11	John Andretti	18	13	41	**20**	13	19	42	18	33	31	7	12	22	20	13	3	6	12	7	8	9	38	3	14	5	9	37	12	21	14	6	34	32	3682
12	Ken Schrader	4	23	21	17	18	6	21	10	29	15	10	15	4	28	43	20	9	8	10	24	14	14	42	13	4	39	13	40	**24**	9	**22**	14	7	3675
13	Sterling Marlin	22	25	24	DNQ	14	40	14	36	9	14	15	19	10	18	9	7	35	11	11	7	15	21	17	8	15	16	18*	30	14	18	12	13	42	3530
14	Jimmy Spencer	15	4	7	41	21	14	7	30	2	21	13	24	14	11	10	29	25	19	32	20			13	34	9	27	19	10	4	12	26	30	21	3464
15	Chad Little	7	21	10	DNQ	17	35	2	16	34	6	35	37	13	16	30	23	22	16	28	16	10	23	14	18	12	17	36	8	8	20	20	40	11	3423
16	Ward Burton	25	11	18	24	11	17	15	28	8	12	34	29	19	**8**	24	40	23	**34**	34	21	37	37	31	12	28	33	11	2	30	7	14	7	14	3352
17	Michael Waltrip	9	34	14	18	16	9	9	21	21	20	18	14	40	21	14	34	24	10	21	28	22	16	27	17	26	20	20	13	9	31	DNQ	22	22	3340
18	Bill Elliott	10	6	9	11	15	15	13	12	39	43	14	13	25	6	37	12	26	36	12	27	40	19	37	11	40		7	11	19	15	38	12	26	3305
19	Ernie Irvan	6	19	30	15	36	20	43	9	6	13	11	9	29	14	34	36	20	9	**6**	33	**6***	22	28	6	14	8	**8**	31	37	8				3262
20	Johnny Benson	DNQ	30	4	9	8	5	5	38	41	8	9	41	18	22	36	21	21	33	25	9	34	33	21	21	41	15	9	28	31	26	9	41	23	3160
21	Mike Skinner	8	32	29	42	28	32	33				29	27	30	29	29	17	5	30	4	3	19	7	15	26	8	32	16	21	7*	3	16	21	9	3153
22	Ricky Rudd	42	43	12	23	33	30	27	14	24	11	31	6	11	37	41	28	19	42	31	14	13	9	10	22	34	13	1	37	18	27	27	10	24	3131
23	Ted Musgrave	20	35	6	29	10	8	30	2	42	33	12	22	15	26	17	19	39	15	19	19	39	20		43	25	26	15	27	11	34	5	19	19	3124
24	Darrell Waltrip	33	41	35	40	30	23	36	40	15	5	17	20	32	12	6	13	13	13	13	25	25	27	32	38	18	21	21	22	23	28	31	32	38	2957
25	Brett Bodine	24	16	26	26	22	11	16	13	11	28	22	16	20	33	18	32	28	38	33	34	32	26	30	42	19	22	34	19	13	25	43	31	31	2907
26	Joe Nemechek	26	39	37	35	37	DNQ	4	24	32	22	6	26	12	9	35	25	36	17	24	12	12	31	18	35	37	29	40	7	29	17	18	17	40	2897
27	Geoff Bodine	31	5	13	22	41	39	32	35	DNQ	7	23	23	28	23	40	35	37	14	37	32	21	30	23	9	13	14	39	9	25	41	34	11	10	2864
28	Kenny Irwin Jr. **(R)**	19	26	36	5*	39	43	39	19	40	16	DNQ	33	9	13	11	9	33	22	38	37	16	15	11	41	10	40	27	20	43	32	40	33	**16**	2760
29	Dick Trickle	27	37	16	6	24	13	22	37	20	37	21	21	17	24	27	33	17	29	18	41	38	43	19	33	42	31	33	33	38	DNQ	19	23	12	2678
30	Kyle Petty	11	24	22	36	29	38	17	34	38	42	30	42	24	36	31	26	8	21	14	6	29	12	33	28	39	41	29	18	20	22	36	39	29	2675
31	Kenny Wallace	DNQ	38	43	7	9	42	34	22	7	19	25	40	23	39	39	22	10	35	43	26	DNQ	42	6	10	11	43	43	16	40	35	8	16	34	2615
32	Robert Pressley	32	40	23	27	20	28	3	23	31	17	16	39	41	32	16	30	34	32	29	29	24	40	12	30	43			41	26	DNQ	17	38	28	2388
33	Rick Mast	30	**12**	11	33	43	25	41	33	18	25	26	11	43	31	38	8	32	37	22	30	26	35	22	36	31	24	41	34	DNQ	DNQ	29	42	DNQ	2296
34	Steve Grissom	28	20	39	16	19	16	10	25	16	30	32	32	39	41	23	10	43	39	23	38	33	DNQ	25	20	17	DNQ		32	36	29		DNQ	DNQ	2215
35	Kevin Lepage **(R)**	43	DNQ	28	14	34	27	37	42	14	40	36	28	33	40	19	QL					17	10	16	39	36	12	17	6	35	40	13	43	18	2196
36	Jerry Nadeau **(R)**	21	28	DNQ	32	31	37	DNQ	27	37	26	40		38	35	21	43	27	26	26	15	30	32	29	32	23	36	35	35	42	19	39	24	37	2121
37	Derrike Cope	37	15	31	38	40	26	DNQ		22	39	33	35	34	DNQ	26	38	16	23	DNQ	39	43	36	DNQ	27	24	35	30	**14**	11	38	33	25	30	2065
38	Wally Dallenbach Jr.	DNQ	DNQ	38	39	DNQ		19	DNQ	26	29				10	7	27		25	40		8	28	43	31	30	25	32	23	39	30	25	36	35	1832
39	Rich Bickle								41	DNQ	DNQ	24	31	27	27	32	31	38	28	39	22	28	18	40	19	DNQ	19	4	17	DNQ	39	11	18	DNQ	1773
40	Jeff Green	DNQ	22	33	DNQ	32	DNQ		17	DNQ				42	30	33		12	24	30		41	17	38	16	20	34	31	DNQ	33	37	28	27	36	1687
41	Steve Park **(R)**	41	31	DNQ	Wth															35	18	11	34	41	24	27	11	24	36	41	33	24	35	17	1322
42	Todd Bodine	DNQ	DNQ	DNQ	10	27	29	DNQ	39	DNQ		28	DNQ	35	DNQ	22	DNQ									32	37	12	15			15	20	5	1322
43	Lake Speed	17	27	32	28	25	31	20	20	25	30	27	36	26	25	25	Wth	41																	1297
44	David Green	DNQ	42	34	30	26	21	18	43	17	18	43	38	QL														DNQ	43			37	26	41	1014
45	Dave Marcis	36	DNQ	DNQ	DNQ	DNQ	DNQ	28	DNQ	27	DNQ	DNQ	30	36	DNQ	DNQ	DNQ	DNQ	43	41	DNQ	DNQ	DNQ	35	DNQ	33	DNQ	26	DNQ	12	21	DNQ	DNQ	27	949
46	Ricky Craven	14	10	27	34													**29**	41	17	35										QL	30	37	25	907
47	Morgan Shepherd		DNQ		DNQ	DNQ	24		11	35	24	DNQ			43				40	15	43	42	29	26	DNQ		DNQ							39	843
48	Gary Bradberry	DNQ	DNQ	DNQ	43	DNQ	DNQ	24	DNQ	DNQ	23	37	34		34			40	DNQ	DNQ		DNQ	DNQ		37	DNQ	28	DNQ	42	DNQ	DNQ	41	28	33	787
49	Randy LaJoie					38	10	25	5	10	36	38	43	31																					768
50	Hut Stricklin	DNQ	29	43	37	DNQ	41	40	31	DNQ	DNQ	DNQ			42	28		42	27	DNQ		DNQ	41		DNQ		30				42				700
51	Dennis Setzer									19												35	39	24	29	29		38							502
52	Buckshot Jones												8	DNQ		DNQ				27		27		DNQ		DNQ	42			16				Wth	458
53	Greg Sacks	39	36	25	31	42	36	38																											400
54	Andy Hillenburg	29			DNQ			DNQ				DNQ						31											DNQ	22	24		DNQ	DNQ	334
55	Billy Standridge	35						DNQ		28		DNQ																		28	43				250
56	Tommy Kendall																16				17														232
57	Matt Kenseth									DNQ																	6								150
58	Mike Bliss																											25				35			146
59	Elliott Sadler											42											24												128
60	Ron Hornaday Jr.					DNQ											14																		121
61	Tom Hubert																41				36														95
62	Mike Wallace	23																																	94
63	Ron Fellows																				42			36											92
64	Butch Gilliland			Wth													24																		91
65	Frank Kimmel																					31													70
66	Mike Dillon										35																								58
67	Robby Gordon																37			DNQ															57
68	Dan Pardus	DNQ								DNQ		DNQ								DNQ				DNQ						DNQ	36				55
69	Mark Gibson	DNQ																																	
70	Norm Benning	DNQ																																	
71	Michael Ciochetti	DNQ																																	
72	Loy Allen Jr.	DNQ																		DNQ											Wth				
73	Larry Gunselman			DNQ																															
74	Tony Raines			DNQ							DNQ				DNQ														DNQ						
75	Phil Parsons				DNQ																														
76	Bob Strait									DNQ																									
77	Randy MacDonald											DNQ							DNQ	DNQ								DNQ	DNQ						
78	Rick Ware																DNQ																		
79	Chris Raudman																DNQ																		
80	Jimmy Horton																		DNQ																
81	Lance Hooper																			DNQ															
82	Brian Cunningham																				DNQ														
83	Rick Wilson																				DNQ									DNQ	DNQ				
84	Ken Bouchard																						DNQ	Wth		DNQ		DNQ							
85	Bobby Gerhart																													DNQ					
86	Jeff Ward																															DNQ			
87	Harris DeVane																																	DNQ	
88	Randy Renfrow	Wth																																	
89	Tim Steele	Wth																	Wth																
90	Jerry Glanville													Wth																					
91	Bob Schacht																			Wth															
92	Boris Said																				Wth														
93	Randal Ritter																														Wth				
94	Phil Barkdoll	QL																																	
Pos	Driver	DAY	CAR	LVS	ATL	DAR	BRI	TEX	MAR	TAL	CAL	CLT	DOV	RCH	MCH	POC	SON	NHA	POC	IND	GLN	MCH	BRI	NHA	DAR	RCH	DOV	MAR	CLT	TAL	DAY	PHO	CAR	ATL	Points

== Rookie of the Year ==
This would be the last time until 2004 in which a rookie candidate did not win a race. The winner of this year's award was Kenny Irwin Jr., who qualified for 32 of the 33 races, had four top-tens, and one pole position in his Robert Yates Racing Ford. Kevin Lepage finished in second-place despite missing six races and starting the year with an underfunded team. Third-place finisher Jerry Nadeau also switched teams, starting the year with Bill Elliott Racing but winding up at Melling Racing at season's end. Finally, the last-place finisher was pre-season favorite Steve Park, who missed most of the year after suffering a broken leg in a practice crash at Atlanta Motor Speedway.

== See also ==
- 1998 NASCAR Busch Series
- 1998 NASCAR Craftsman Truck Series
- 1998 NASCAR Winston West Series
- 1998 ARCA Bondo/Mar-Hyde Series
- 1998 NASCAR Goody's Dash Series

== Sources ==
- Racing Reference

TV schedule provided by

- Race2Win
- The Auto Channel
