= 1998 Exide NASCAR Select Batteries 400 =

25th race of the 1998 NASCAR Winston Cup Series

Race details
- Race 25 of 33 in the 1998 NASCAR Winston Cup Series
- The 1998 Exide NASCAR Select Batteries 400 program cover, featuring Jeff Burton.
- Date: September 12, 1998
- Location: Richmond, Virginia, Richmond International Raceway
- Course: Permanent racing facility
- Course length: 0.75 miles (1.21 km)
- Distance: 400 laps, 300 mi (482.803 km)
- Average speed: 91.985 miles per hour (148.036 km/h)

Pole position
Driver	Rusty Wallace	Penske-Kranefuss Racing
- Time: 21.535

Most laps led
Driver	Jeff Burton	Jeff Burton
- Laps: 203

Winner
No. 99	Jeff Burton	Roush Racing

Television in the United States
- Network: ESPN
- Announcers: Bob Jenkins, Ned Jarrett, Benny Parsons

Radio in the United States
- Radio: Motor Racing Network

The 1998 Exide NASCAR Select Batteries 400 was the 25th stock car race of the 1998 NASCAR Winston Cup Series season and the 41st iteration of the event. The race was held on Saturday, September 12, 1998, in Richmond, Virginia, at Richmond International Raceway, a 0.75 miles (1.21 km) D-shaped oval. The race took the scheduled 400 laps to complete. In a close finish, Roush Racing driver Jeff Burton was able to fend off Hendrick Motorsports driver Jeff Gordon at the line by 0.051 seconds to win his fifth career NASCAR Winston Cup Series and his second and final victory of the season. To fill out the podium, Roush Racing driver Mark Martin would finish third.

== Background ==
The layout of Richmond International Raceway, the venue where the race was at.

Richmond International Raceway (RIR) is a 3/4 mile (1.2 km), D-shaped, asphalt racetrack located just outside Richmond, Virginia, in Henrico County. It is known as "America's premier short track."

=== Entry list ===
- (R) denotes rookie driver.

#	Driver	Team	Make
00	Buckshot Jones	Stavola Brothers Racing	Chevrolet
1	Steve Park (R)	Dale Earnhardt, Inc.	Chevrolet
2	Rusty Wallace	Penske-Kranefuss Racing	Ford
3	Dale Earnhardt	Richard Childress Racing	Chevrolet
4	Bobby Hamilton	Morgan–McClure Motorsports	Chevrolet
5	Terry Labonte	Hendrick Motorsports	Chevrolet
6	Mark Martin	Roush Racing	Ford
7	Geoff Bodine	Mattei Motorsports	Ford
9	Jerry Nadeau (R)	Melling Racing	Ford
10	Ricky Rudd	Rudd Performance Motorsports	Ford
11	Brett Bodine	Brett Bodine Racing	Ford
12	Jeremy Mayfield	Penske-Kranefuss Racing	Ford
13	Dennis Setzer	Elliott-Marino Racing	Ford
16	Kevin Lepage (R)	Roush Racing	Ford
18	Bobby Labonte	Joe Gibbs Racing	Pontiac
21	Michael Waltrip	Wood Brothers Racing	Ford
22	Ward Burton	Bill Davis Racing	Pontiac
23	Jimmy Spencer	Travis Carter Enterprises	Ford
24	Jeff Gordon	Hendrick Motorsports	Chevrolet
26	Johnny Benson Jr.	Roush Racing	Ford
28	Kenny Irwin Jr. (R)	Robert Yates Racing	Ford
30	Derrike Cope	Bahari Racing	Pontiac
31	Mike Skinner	Richard Childress Racing	Chevrolet
33	Ken Schrader	Andy Petree Racing	Chevrolet
35	Darrell Waltrip	Tyler Jet Motorsports	Pontiac
36	Ernie Irvan	MB2 Motorsports	Pontiac
40	Sterling Marlin	Team SABCO	Chevrolet
41	Steve Grissom	Larry Hedrick Motorsports	Chevrolet
42	Joe Nemechek	Team SABCO	Chevrolet
43	John Andretti	Petty Enterprises	Pontiac
44	Kyle Petty	Petty Enterprises	Pontiac
46	Jeff Green	Team SABCO	Chevrolet
50	Wally Dallenbach Jr.	Hendrick Motorsports	Chevrolet
71	Dave Marcis	Marcis Auto Racing	Chevrolet
75	Rick Mast	Butch Mock Motorsports	Ford
77	Robert Pressley	Jasper Motorsports	Ford
78	Gary Bradberry	Triad Motorsports	Ford
79	Ken Bouchard	T.R.I.X. Racing	Chevrolet
81	Kenny Wallace	FILMAR Racing	Ford
88	Dale Jarrett	Robert Yates Racing	Ford
90	Dick Trickle	Donlavey Racing	Ford
91	Todd Bodine	LJ Racing	Chevrolet
94	Bill Elliott	Elliott-Marino Racing	Ford
96	Ted Musgrave	American Equipment Racing	Chevrolet
97	Chad Little	Roush Racing	Ford
98	Rich Bickle	Cale Yarborough Motorsports	Ford
99	Jeff Burton	Roush Racing	Ford

== Practice ==
=== First practice ===
The first practice session was held on Friday, September 11, at 11:00 AM EST. The session would last for one hour and 15 minutes. Rusty Wallace, driving for Penske-Kranefuss Racing, would set the fastest time in the session, with a lap of 21.864 and an average speed of 123.491 mph (198.739 km/h).

Pos.	#	Driver	Team	Make	Time	Speed
1	2	Rusty Wallace	Penske-Kranefuss Racing	Ford	21.864	123.491
2	4	Bobby Hamilton	Morgan–McClure Motorsports	Chevrolet	21.986	122.805
3	42	Joe Nemechek	Team SABCO	Chevrolet	22.034	122.538
Full first practice results

=== Second practice ===
The second practice session was held on Friday, September 11, at 2:30 PM EST. The session would last for two hours and 10 minutes. Ken Schrader, driving for Andy Petree Racing, would set the fastest time in the session, with a lap of 21.793 and an average speed of 123.893 mph (199.386 km/h).

Pos.	#	Driver	Team	Make	Time	Speed
1	33	Ken Schrader	Andy Petree Racing	Chevrolet	21.793	123.893
2	23	Jimmy Spencer	Travis Carter Enterprises	Ford	21.881	123.395
3	4	Bobby Hamilton	Morgan–McClure Motorsports	Chevrolet	21.883	123.383
Full second practice results

=== Final practice ===
The final practice session, sometimes known as Happy Hour, was held on Saturday, September 12, at 12:00 PM EST. The session would last for one hour. Dick Trickle, driving for Donlavey Racing, would set the fastest time in the session, with a lap of 22.281 and an average speed of 121.179 mph (195.019 km/h).

Pos.	#	Driver	Team	Make	Time	Speed
1	90	Dick Trickle	Donlavey Racing	Ford	22.281	121.179
2	24	Jeff Gordon	Hendrick Motorsports	Chevrolet	22.339	120.865
3	99	Jeff Burton	Roush Racing	Ford	22.361	120.746
Full Happy Hour practice results

== Qualifying ==
Qualifying was split into two rounds. The first round was held on Friday, September 11, at 5:30 PM EST. Each driver would have one lap to set a time. During the first round, the top 25 drivers in the round would be guaranteed a starting spot in the race. If a driver was not able to guarantee a spot in the first round, they had the option to scrub their time from the first round and try and run a faster lap time in a second round qualifying run, held on Saturday, September 12, at 2:00 PM EST. As with the first round, each driver would have one lap to set a time. On January 24, 1998, NASCAR would announce that the amount of provisionals given would be increased from last season. Positions 26-36 would be decided on time, while positions 37-43 would be based on provisionals. Six spots are awarded by the use of provisionals based on owner's points. The seventh is awarded to a past champion who has not otherwise qualified for the race. If no past champion needs the provisional, the next team in the owner points will be awarded a provisional.

Rusty Wallace, driving for Penske-Kranefuss Racing, would win the pole, setting a time of 21.535 and an average speed of 125.377 miles per hour (201.775 km/h).

Four drivers would fail to qualify: Buckshot Jones, Gary Bradberry, Ken Bouchard, and Rich Bickle.

=== Full qualifying results ===
Pos.	#	Driver	Team	Make	Time	Speed
1	2	Rusty Wallace	Penske-Kranefuss Racing	Ford	21.535	125.377
2	33	Ken Schrader	Andy Petree Racing	Chevrolet	21.678	124.550
3	99	Jeff Burton	Roush Racing	Ford	21.715	124.338
4	40	Sterling Marlin	Team SABCO	Chevrolet	21.735	124.224
5	24	Jeff Gordon	Hendrick Motorsports	Chevrolet	21.766	124.047
6	4	Bobby Hamilton	Morgan–McClure Motorsports	Chevrolet	21.804	123.830
7	88	Dale Jarrett	Robert Yates Racing	Ford	21.807	123.813
8	30	Derrike Cope	Bahari Racing	Pontiac	21.824	123.717
9	43	John Andretti	Petty Enterprises	Pontiac	21.835	123.655
10	18	Bobby Labonte	Joe Gibbs Racing	Pontiac	21.843	123.609
11	44	Kyle Petty	Petty Enterprises	Pontiac	21.867	123.474
12	6	Mark Martin	Roush Racing	Ford	21.875	123.429
13	81	Kenny Wallace	FILMAR Racing	Ford	21.885	123.372
14	50	Wally Dallenbach Jr.	Hendrick Motorsports	Chevrolet	21.889	123.350
15	22	Ward Burton	Bill Davis Racing	Pontiac	21.893	123.327
16	23	Jimmy Spencer	Travis Carter Enterprises	Ford	21.901	123.282
17	96	Ted Musgrave	American Equipment Racing	Chevrolet	21.912	123.220
18	91	Todd Bodine	LJ Racing	Chevrolet	21.952	122.996
19	9	Jerry Nadeau (R)	Melling Racing	Ford	21.956	122.973
20	77	Robert Pressley	Jasper Motorsports	Ford	21.969	122.900
21	94	Bill Elliott	Elliott-Marino Racing	Ford	21.972	122.884
22	71	Dave Marcis	Marcis Auto Racing	Chevrolet	21.976	122.861
23	97	Chad Little	Roush Racing	Ford	21.985	122.811
24	41	Steve Grissom	Larry Hedrick Motorsports	Chevrolet	21.986	122.805
25	10	Ricky Rudd	Rudd Performance Motorsports	Ford	21.989	122.789
26	31	Mike Skinner	Richard Childress Racing	Chevrolet	21.967	122.912
27	75	Rick Mast	Butch Mock Motorsports	Ford	21.991	122.777
28	46	Jeff Green	Team SABCO	Chevrolet	21.996	122.750
29	13	Dennis Setzer	Elliott-Marino Racing	Ford	21.996	122.750
30	36	Ernie Irvan	MB2 Motorsports	Pontiac	22.009	122.677
31	21	Michael Waltrip	Wood Brothers Racing	Ford	22.014	122.649
32	26	Johnny Benson Jr.	Roush Racing	Ford	22.015	122.644
33	11	Brett Bodine	Brett Bodine Racing	Ford	22.016	122.638
34	3	Dale Earnhardt	Richard Childress Racing	Chevrolet	22.020	122.616
35	5	Terry Labonte	Hendrick Motorsports	Chevrolet	22.028	122.571
36	28	Kenny Irwin Jr. (R)	Robert Yates Racing	Ford	22.031	122.555
Provisionals
37	12	Jeremy Mayfield	Penske-Kranefuss Racing	Ford	-*	-*
38	16	Kevin Lepage (R)	Roush Racing	Ford	-*	-*
39	42	Joe Nemechek	Team SABCO	Chevrolet	-*	-*
40	1	Steve Park (R)	Dale Earnhardt, Inc.	Chevrolet	-*	-*
41	90	Dick Trickle	Donlavey Racing	Ford	-*	-*
42	7	Geoff Bodine	Mattei Motorsports	Ford	-*	-*
Champion's Provisional
43	35	Darrell Waltrip	Tyler Jet Motorsports	Pontiac	-*	-*
Failed to qualify
44	00	Buckshot Jones	Stavola Brothers Racing	Chevrolet	22.097	122.189
45	78	Gary Bradberry	Triad Motorsports	Ford	22.116	122.084
46	79	Ken Bouchard	T.R.I.X. Racing	Chevrolet	22.277	121.201
47	98	Rich Bickle	Cale Yarborough Motorsports	Ford	22.293	121.114
Official qualifying results

*Time not available.

== Race results ==
Fin	St	#	Driver	Team	Make	Laps	Led	Status	Pts	Winnings
1	3	99	Jeff Burton	Roush Racing	Ford	400	203	running	185	$108,495
2	5	24	Jeff Gordon	Hendrick Motorsports	Chevrolet	400	30	running	175	$85,190
3	12	6	Mark Martin	Roush Racing	Ford	400	1	running	170	$60,580
4	2	33	Ken Schrader	Andy Petree Racing	Chevrolet	400	1	running	165	$65,230
5	9	43	John Andretti	Petty Enterprises	Pontiac	400	0	running	155	$52,280
6	6	4	Bobby Hamilton	Morgan–McClure Motorsports	Chevrolet	400	10	running	155	$47,930
7	1	2	Rusty Wallace	Penske-Kranefuss Racing	Ford	400	103	running	151	$45,630
8	26	31	Mike Skinner	Richard Childress Racing	Chevrolet	400	0	running	142	$31,780
9	16	23	Jimmy Spencer	Travis Carter Enterprises	Ford	400	32	running	143	$38,280
10	36	28	Kenny Irwin Jr. (R)	Robert Yates Racing	Ford	400	1	running	139	$47,880
11	13	81	Kenny Wallace	FILMAR Racing	Ford	399	0	running	130	$28,180
12	23	97	Chad Little	Roush Racing	Ford	399	0	running	127	$27,180
13	42	7	Geoff Bodine	Mattei Motorsports	Ford	399	6	running	129	$36,230
14	30	36	Ernie Irvan	MB2 Motorsports	Pontiac	399	0	running	121	$33,330
15	4	40	Sterling Marlin	Team SABCO	Chevrolet	399	0	running	118	$26,855
16	7	88	Dale Jarrett	Robert Yates Racing	Ford	398	0	running	115	$39,630
17	24	41	Steve Grissom	Larry Hedrick Motorsports	Chevrolet	398	0	running	112	$32,630
18	43	35	Darrell Waltrip	Tyler Jet Motorsports	Pontiac	398	0	running	109	$21,380
19	33	11	Brett Bodine	Brett Bodine Racing	Ford	398	0	running	106	$31,955
20	28	46	Jeff Green	Team SABCO	Chevrolet	398	0	running	103	$26,880
21	35	5	Terry Labonte	Hendrick Motorsports	Chevrolet	398	0	running	100	$36,980
22	37	12	Jeremy Mayfield	Penske-Kranefuss Racing	Ford	398	0	running	97	$31,355
23	19	9	Jerry Nadeau (R)	Melling Racing	Ford	398	0	running	94	$24,080
24	8	30	Derrike Cope	Bahari Racing	Pontiac	398	0	running	91	$30,855
25	17	96	Ted Musgrave	American Equipment Racing	Chevrolet	397	0	running	88	$20,405
26	31	21	Michael Waltrip	Wood Brothers Racing	Ford	397	0	running	85	$30,480
27	40	1	Steve Park (R)	Dale Earnhardt, Inc.	Chevrolet	397	0	running	82	$23,255
28	15	22	Ward Burton	Bill Davis Racing	Pontiac	397	0	running	79	$30,030
29	29	13	Dennis Setzer	Elliott-Marino Racing	Ford	397	0	running	76	$19,910
30	14	50	Wally Dallenbach Jr.	Hendrick Motorsports	Chevrolet	397	0	running	73	$29,800
31	27	75	Rick Mast	Butch Mock Motorsports	Ford	394	0	running	70	$22,265
32	18	91	Todd Bodine	LJ Racing	Chevrolet	392	2	running	72	$19,730
33	22	71	Dave Marcis	Marcis Auto Racing	Chevrolet	392	0	running	64	$19,695
34	25	10	Ricky Rudd	Rudd Performance Motorsports	Ford	383	0	running	61	$36,035
35	10	18	Bobby Labonte	Joe Gibbs Racing	Pontiac	363	0	crash	58	$37,100
36	38	16	Kevin Lepage (R)	Roush Racing	Ford	333	0	transmission	55	$26,565
37	39	42	Joe Nemechek	Team SABCO	Chevrolet	293	0	running	52	$26,530
38	34	3	Dale Earnhardt	Richard Childress Racing	Chevrolet	260	0	running	49	$34,495
39	11	44	Kyle Petty	Petty Enterprises	Pontiac	213	0	crash	46	$26,460
40	21	94	Bill Elliott	Elliott-Marino Racing	Ford	194	0	engine	43	$26,425
41	32	26	Johnny Benson Jr.	Roush Racing	Ford	190	11	engine	45	$26,390
42	41	90	Dick Trickle	Donlavey Racing	Ford	141	0	crash	37	$26,355
43	20	77	Robert Pressley	Jasper Motorsports	Ford	33	0	crash	34	$19,345
Official race results

Previous race: 1998 Pepsi Southern 500	NASCAR Winston Cup Series; 1998 season	Next race: 1998 MBNA Gold 400
