= NASCAR AutoZone Elite Division, Southwest Series =

Car racing series

The NASCAR AutoZone Elite Division, Southwest Series (originally NASCAR Featherlite Southwest Tour) was a late model stock car racing series sanctioned by NASCAR that was held in the Southwestern United States. The original NASCAR Southwest Tour began in 1985 and ran until NASCAR discontinued the Elite Division in 2006.

The cars feature a perimeter frame chassis where rails of equal lengths must kick out, compared to the more modern offset chassis where one side is straight and one side kicks out. They weigh 2,900 pounds and have a fiberglass body.

When NASCAR eliminated the Elite Division at the end of the 2006 season, several competitors joined former IRL driver Davey Hamilton's SRL Southwest Tour.

== Champions ==
=== NASCAR AutoZone Elite Division, Southwest Series ===
- 2006: Rip Michels
- 2005: Jim Pettit II
- 2004: Jim Pettit II
- 2003: Auggie Vidovich

=== NASCAR Featherlite Southwest Tour ===
- 2002: Eddy McKean
- 2001: Craig Raudman
- 2000: Matt Crafton
- 1999: Kurt Busch
- 1998: Steve Portenga
- 1997: Brian Germone
- 1996: Chris Raudman
- 1995: Lance Hooper
- 1994: Steve Portenga
- 1993: Ron Hornaday Jr.
- 1992: Ron Hornaday Jr.
- 1991: Rick Carelli
- 1990: Doug George
- 1989: Dan Press
- 1988: Roman Calczynski
- 1987: Mike Chase
- 1986: Ron Esau
