= Craig Raudman =

American stock car driver and crew chief (born 1961)

- Born: August 6, 1961 (age 65); Redding, California, U.S.
- Achievements: 2001 NASCAR Featherlite Southwest Tour Champion

NASCAR O'Reilly Auto Parts Series career
- 1 race run over 1 year
- Best finish: 111th (2002)
- First race: 2002 Sam's Town 300 (Las Vegas)
Wins	Top tens	Poles
0	0	0
- Statistics up to date as of December 24, 2011.

Craig Raudman (born August 6, 1961) is an American former NASCAR driver from Redding, California. He won the 2001 NASCAR Featherlite Southwest Tour championship. He only competed in one Busch Series event. It came in 2002, when he ran the event at Las Vegas for Jay Robinson Racing. Raudman started 42nd and managed his way to 32nd by day's end.

Raudman also competed in 20 K&N Pro Series West events as a driver, with one top-five and seven top-tens. Raudman competed in 168 NASCAR Southwest Series races, with 14 wins, 57 top-fives, 93 top-tens and 19 pole-positions. He was the 2001 NASCAR Featherlite Southwest Tour Champion.

Raudman also competed in two NASCAR Northwest Series events, with a best-finish of 4th at Portland International Raceway.

Raudman was also the crew chief for Jonathon Gomez, Justin Allgaier, Brian Ickler, Kelly Admiraal and several other drivers in the NASCAR K&N Pro Series West and also in NASCAR Pinty's Series.

== Motorsports career results ==
=== NASCAR ===
(key) (Bold – Pole position awarded by qualifying time. Italics – Pole position earned by points standings or practice time. * – Most laps led.)

==== Busch Series ====
NASCAR Busch Series results
Year	Team	No.	Make	1	2	3	4	5	6	7	8	9	10	11	12	13	14	15	16	17	18	19	20	21	22	23	24	25	26	27	28	29	30	31	32	33	34	NBSC	Pts	Ref
2002	Jay Robinson Racing	49	Ford	DAY	CAR	LVS; 32	DAR	BRI	TEX	NSH	TAL	CAL	RCH	NHA	NZH	CLT	DOV	NSH	KEN	MLW	DAY	CHI	GTY	PPR	IRP	MCH	BRI	DAR	RCH	DOV	KAN	CLT	MEM	ATL	CAR	PHO	HOM	111th	67	

Sporting positions
Preceded by Matt Crafton	NASCAR Featherlite Southwest Tour Champion; 2001	Succeeded by Eddy McKean
