= ASC Games =

American video game publisher (1989–2000)

- Type: Private
- Industry: Video games
- Founded: 1989
- Founder: Steve Grossman
- Defunct: January 7, 2000
- Headquarters: Darien, Connecticut, United States
- Key people: Steve Grossman (Chairman, CEO); David Klein (Executive Vice President)
- Number of employees: 35 (2000)
- Website: ASCGames.com

ASC Games (abbreviated from American Softworks Corporation) was an American video game publisher founded in 1989. Formerly based in Darien, Connecticut, the company quickly became a major publisher for games on the Nintendo Entertainment System, Super Nintendo Entertainment System, and Sega Genesis. The company was founded in 1989 and went defunct in 2000. It was notable for publishing the original Windows release of Grand Theft Auto.

== History ==
The company was originally founded in 1989 by Steve Grossman in order to become a Nintendo licensee to develop games for the NES and Game Boy. The company was originally abbreviated as ASW, later changing to ASC in 1991. The company then presented its first game, The Mutant Virus, by independent New Jersey-based developer Rocket Science Productions, to the NES.

In 1991, the company released the competition title, Treasure Master, for the NES as its first released game, where people can win $10,000 in competition that was due on April 11, 1992 on MTV and Nickelodeon that came off with a secret password.

In 1993, the company acquired a license of the Troll dolls and decided to made the game Super Troll Islands. The company also acquired the rights to the license of the film Happily Ever After. The company later begin a relationship with The Nashville Network, to license the branding for sports video games, starting with TNN Bass Tournament of Champions.

The company was also publishing video games on Mexican boxer Julio César Chávez, which were actually reskinned versions of Riddick Bowe Boxing and Boxing Legends of the Ring, as well as Super Copa, which was a reskinned version of Tony Meola's Sidekicks Soccer.

The company was increasingly profitable in the mid 1990s thanks to David Klein, which led to the development of the successful Ten Pin Alley, and begin using the trade name ASC Games. The company decided to attempt to get into major AAA publishing, by publishing high-profile action adventure titles S.T.O.R.M and Perfect Weapon in 1996, and then publishing the action-adventure game One, developed by Visual Concepts in 1997.

In August 1997, the company acquired the publishing rights to Mass Destruction from BMG Interactive. In late 1997, the company acquired the publishing rights to the video game Grand Theft Auto, from BMG Interactive, and released it to critical and commercial success, cementing ASC's profile, and hit its massive attention. In late 1997, the company signed a deal with Jeff Gordon, in which the company decided to release a racing game tie-in Jeff Gordon XS Racing, for platforms by 1999.

The company eventually shut down on January 7, 2000, due to the financial issues that came with the ongoing delay of their upcoming game, Werewolf: The Apocalypse – The Heart of Gaia, which was in development by DreamForge Intertainment.

== Legacy ==
Although ASC Games has closed, many of the games it published are still remembered by retro gaming enthusiasts. The company is recognized for its contribution to the video game market in the 1990s and for having participated in the publication of titles that have left their mark on video game history. Steve Grossman had moved on to found XS Games, which was a spiritual successor to ASC and hold the rights to the titles.

== Games Published ==
Release year	Title	Platform	Developer	Notes
1991	Treasure Master	NES	Software Creations	
1992	The Mutant Virus: Crisis in a Computer World	NES	Rocket Science Productions	
1992	Power Punch II	NES	Beam Software	
1992	Skuljagger: Revolt of the Westicans	Super NES	Realtime Associates	
1993	The Trolls in Crazyland	NES	KID	Europe only
1993	Super James Pond	Super NES	Millennium Interactive	
1994	Super Troll Islands	Super NES	Millennium Interactive	
1994	Chavez	Super NES	Malibu Interactive	Mexico only
1994	Snow White in Happily Ever After	Super NES	Imagitec Design	
1994	TNN Bass Tournament of Champions	Super NES	Gaps	
1994	TNN Bass Tournament of Champions	Sega Genesis	Imagitec Design	Different game from the Super NES version
1994	Chavez II	Super NES, Genesis	Sculptured Software	Mexico only
1994	Super Copa	Super NES	Sculptured Software	Mexico only
1994	Cannondale Cup	Super NES	Radical Entertainment	
1996	TNN Outdoors Bass Tournament '96	Sega Genesis, MS-DOS	Imagitec Design	
1996	S.T.O.R.M.	MS-DOS, Windows	Virtual Studio	European-only release
1996	Perfect Weapon	PlayStation, Windows	Gray Matter	
1996	TNN Motor Sports Hardcore 4x4	PlayStation, Sega Saturn, Windows	Gremlin Interactive	
1996	Ten Pin Alley	PlayStation, Sega Saturn, Windows	Adrenalin Entertainment	
1997	Mass Destruction	PlayStation, Sega Saturn, Windows	NMS Software	Licensed from BMG Interactive
1997	One	PlayStation	Visual Concepts	
1998	Grand Theft Auto	Windows	DMA Design	Licensed from BMG Interactive
1998	Sanitarium	Windows	DreamForge Intertainment	
1998	TNN Outdoors Pro Hunter	Windows	DreamForge Intertainment	
1998	Animaniacs: Ten Pin Alley	PlayStation	Saffire	
1999	Dead in the Water	PlayStation	Player 1	
1999	Jeff Gordon XS Racing	Windows	Real Sports	
1999	Jeff Gordon XS Racing	Game Boy Color	Natsume	
1999	TNN Outdoors Fishing Champ	Game Boy Color	Starfish	
1999	TNN Motorsports Hardcore Heat	Dreamcast	CSK Research Institute	
1999	TNN Outdoors Pro Hunter 2	Windows	Monolith Productions	
1999	TNN Motorsports Hardcore TR	PlayStation	Eutechnyx	
