= 1998 Pontiac Excitement 400 =

13th race of the 1998 NASCAR Winston Cup Series

Race details
- Race 13 of 33 in the 1998 NASCAR Winston Cup Series
- The 1998 Pontiac Excitement 400 program cover, with artwork by Sam Bass.
- Date: June 6, 1998
- Official name: 44th Annual Pontiac Excitement 400
- Location: Richmond, Virginia, Richmond International Raceway
- Course: Permanent racing facility
- Course length: 0.75 miles (1.21 km)
- Distance: 400 laps, 300 mi (482.803 km)
- Average speed: 97.044 miles per hour (156.177 km/h)
- Attendance: 103,000

Pole position
| Driver | Jeff Gordon | Hendrick Motorsports |
- Time: 21.504

Most laps led
| Driver | Dale Jarrett | Robert Yates Racing |
- Laps: 108

Winner
| No. 5 | Terry Labonte | Hendrick Motorsports |

Television in the United States
- Network: ESPN
- Announcers: Bob Jenkins, Benny Parsons, Ned Jarrett

Radio in the United States
- Radio: Motor Racing Network

The 1998 Pontiac Excitement 400 was the 13th stock car race of the 1998 NASCAR Winston Cup Series season and the 44th iteration of the event. The race was held on Saturday, June 6, 1998, in Richmond, Virginia, at Richmond International Raceway, a 0.75 miles (1.21 km) D-shaped oval. The race took the scheduled 400 laps to complete. With two laps to go, Hendrick Motorsports driver Terry Labonte would make a final pass in a battle with Robert Yates Racing driver Dale Jarrett. On the fourth turn of the penultimate lap, the caution would come out for Johnny Benson Jr. Labonte was able to defend Jarrett and complete the penultimate lap to take his 20th career NASCAR Winston Cup Series victory and his only victory of the season. To fill out the podium, Jarrett and Penske-Kranefuss Racing driver Rusty Wallace would finish second and third, respectively. The event was overshadowed when Rusty Wallace completely took out Jeff Gordon in turn 2 with 29 laps to go. Gordon in his interview when asked what happened, he replied "well, that's pretty obvious you tell me you know. You got on video. I think it's pretty simple you know I uh- I had the position on him. He just drove into the left rear. I don't know what happened."

== Background ==
The layout of Richmond International Raceway, the venue where the race was at.

Richmond International Raceway (RIR) is a 3/4 mi (1.2 km), D-shaped, asphalt racetrack located just outside Richmond, Virginia, in Henrico County. It is known as "America's premier short track."

=== Entry list ===
- (R) denotes rookie driver.

| # | Driver | Team | Make |
|---|---|---|---|
| 1 | Darrell Waltrip | Dale Earnhardt, Inc. | Chevrolet |
| 2 | Rusty Wallace | Penske-Kranefuss Racing | Ford |
| 3 | Dale Earnhardt | Richard Childress Racing | Chevrolet |
| 4 | Bobby Hamilton | Morgan–McClure Motorsports | Chevrolet |
| 5 | Terry Labonte | Hendrick Motorsports | Chevrolet |
| 6 | Mark Martin | Roush Racing | Ford |
| 7 | Geoff Bodine | Mattei Motorsports | Ford |
| 8 | Buckshot Jones | Stavola Brothers Racing | Chevrolet |
| 9 | Lake Speed | Melling Racing | Ford |
| 10 | Ricky Rudd | Rudd Performance Motorsports | Ford |
| 11 | Brett Bodine | Brett Bodine Racing | Ford |
| 12 | Jeremy Mayfield | Penske-Kranefuss Racing | Ford |
| 13 | Jerry Nadeau (R) | Elliott-Marino Racing | Ford |
| 16 | Ted Musgrave | Roush Racing | Ford |
| 18 | Bobby Labonte | Joe Gibbs Racing | Pontiac |
| 21 | Michael Waltrip | Wood Brothers Racing | Ford |
| 22 | Ward Burton | Bill Davis Racing | Pontiac |
| 23 | Jimmy Spencer | Haas-Carter Motorsports | Ford |
| 24 | Jeff Gordon | Hendrick Motorsports | Chevrolet |
| 26 | Johnny Benson Jr. | Roush Racing | Ford |
| 28 | Kenny Irwin Jr. (R) | Robert Yates Racing | Ford |
| 30 | Derrike Cope | Bahari Racing | Pontiac |
| 31 | Mike Skinner | Richard Childress Racing | Chevrolet |
| 33 | Ken Schrader | Andy Petree Racing | Chevrolet |
| 35 | Todd Bodine | ISM Racing | Pontiac |
| 36 | Ernie Irvan | MB2 Motorsports | Pontiac |
| 40 | Sterling Marlin | Team SABCO | Chevrolet |
| 41 | Steve Grissom | Larry Hedrick Motorsports | Chevrolet |
| 42 | Joe Nemechek | Team SABCO | Chevrolet |
| 43 | John Andretti | Petty Enterprises | Pontiac |
| 44 | Kyle Petty | Petty Enterprises | Pontiac |
| 46 | Jeff Green | Team SABCO | Chevrolet |
| 50 | Randy LaJoie | Hendrick Motorsports | Chevrolet |
| 71 | Dave Marcis | Marcis Auto Racing | Chevrolet |
| 75 | Rick Mast | Butch Mock Motorsports | Ford |
| 77 | Robert Pressley | Jasper Motorsports | Ford |
| 81 | Kenny Wallace | FILMAR Racing | Ford |
| 88 | Dale Jarrett | Robert Yates Racing | Ford |
| 90 | Dick Trickle | Donlavey Racing | Ford |
| 91 | Kevin Lepage (R) | LJ Racing | Chevrolet |
| 94 | Bill Elliott | Elliott-Marino Racing | Ford |
| 96 | David Green* | American Equipment Racing | Chevrolet |
| 97 | Chad Little | Roush Racing | Ford |
| 98 | Rich Bickle | Cale Yarborough Motorsports | Ford |
| 99 | Jeff Burton | Roush Racing | Ford |

*Replaced by Kevin Lepage for Green to recover from a bruised shoulder.

== Practice ==
=== First practice ===
The first practice session was held on the early afternoon of Friday, June 5. Ken Schrader, driving for Andy Petree Racing, would set the fastest time in the session, with a lap of 21.630 and an average speed of 124.827 mph (200.890 km/h).

| Pos. | # | Driver | Team | Make | Time | Speed |
|---|---|---|---|---|---|---|
| 1 | 33 | Ken Schrader | Andy Petree Racing | Chevrolet | 21.630 | 124.827 |
| 2 | 24 | Jeff Gordon | Hendrick Motorsports | Chevrolet | 21.658 | 124.665 |
| 3 | 43 | John Andretti | Petty Enterprises | Pontiac | 21.670 | 124.596 |
Full first practice results

=== Second practice ===
The second practice session was held on late afternoon of Friday, June 5. Kenny Irwin Jr., driving for Robert Yates Racing, would set the fastest time in the session, with a lap of 21.651 and an average speed of 124.706 mph (200.695 km/h).

| Pos. | # | Driver | Team | Make | Time | Speed |
|---|---|---|---|---|---|---|
| 1 | 28 | Kenny Irwin Jr. (R) | Robert Yates Racing | Ford | 21.651 | 124.706 |
| 2 | 46 | Jeff Green | Team SABCO | Chevrolet | 21.672 | 124.585 |
| 3 | 42 | Joe Nemechek | Team SABCO | Chevrolet | 21.676 | 124.562 |
Full second practice results

=== Final practice ===
The final practice session, sometimes referred to as Happy Hour, was held on the evening of Friday, June 5. Ricky Rudd, driving for Rudd Performance Motorsports, would set the fastest time in the session, with a lap of 22.080 and an average speed of 122.283 mph (196.795 km/h).

| Pos. | # | Driver | Team | Make | Time | Speed |
|---|---|---|---|---|---|---|
| 1 | 10 | Ricky Rudd | Rudd Performance Motorsports | Ford | 22.080 | 122.283 |
| 2 | 42 | Joe Nemechek | Team SABCO | Chevrolet | 22.130 | 122.006 |
| 3 | 5 | Terry Labonte | Hendrick Motorsports | Chevrolet | 22.200 | 121.622 |
Full Happy Hour practice results

== Qualifying ==
Qualifying was split into two rounds. The first round was held on Friday, June 5, at 6:00 PM EST. Each driver would have one lap to set a time. During the first round, the top 25 drivers in the round would be guaranteed a starting spot in the race. If a driver was not able to guarantee a spot in the first round, they had the option to scrub their time from the first round and try and run a faster lap time in a second round qualifying run, held on Saturday, June 6, at 2:00 PM EST. As with the first round, each driver would have one lap to set a time. On January 24, 1998, NASCAR would announce that the amount of provisionals given would be increased from last season. Positions 26-36 would be decided on time, while positions 37-43 would be based on provisionals. Six spots are awarded by the use of provisionals based on owner's points. The seventh is awarded to a past champion who has not otherwise qualified for the race. If no past champion needs the provisional, the next team in the owner points will be awarded a provisional.

Jeff Gordon, driving for Hendrick Motorsports, would win the pole, setting a time of 21.504 and an average speed of 125.558 miles per hour (202.066 km/h).

Two drivers would fail to qualify: Kevin Lepage and Buckshot Jones.

=== Full qualifying results ===
| Pos. | # | Driver | Team | Make | Time | Speed |
|---|---|---|---|---|---|---|
| 1 | 24 | Jeff Gordon | Hendrick Motorsports | Chevrolet | 21.504 | 125.558 |
| 2 | 98 | Rich Bickle | Cale Yarborough Motorsports | Ford | 21.548 | 125.302 |
| 3 | 40 | Sterling Marlin | Team SABCO | Chevrolet | 21.604 | 124.977 |
| 4 | 88 | Dale Jarrett | Robert Yates Racing | Ford | 21.647 | 124.729 |
| 5 | 81 | Kenny Wallace | FILMAR Racing | Ford | 21.708 | 124.378 |
| 6 | 46 | Jeff Green | Team SABCO | Chevrolet | 21.733 | 124.235 |
| 7 | 33 | Ken Schrader | Andy Petree Racing | Chevrolet | 21.738 | 124.206 |
| 8 | 26 | Johnny Benson Jr. | Roush Racing | Ford | 21.746 | 124.161 |
| 9 | 97 | Chad Little | Roush Racing | Ford | 21.748 | 124.149 |
| 10 | 16 | Ted Musgrave | Roush Racing | Ford | 21.758 | 124.092 |
| 11 | 28 | Kenny Irwin Jr. (R) | Robert Yates Racing | Ford | 21.765 | 124.052 |
| 12 | 9 | Lake Speed | Melling Racing | Ford | 21.778 | 123.978 |
| 13 | 99 | Jeff Burton | Roush Racing | Ford | 21.783 | 123.950 |
| 14 | 18 | Bobby Labonte | Joe Gibbs Racing | Pontiac | 21.811 | 123.791 |
| 15 | 12 | Jeremy Mayfield | Penske-Kranefuss Racing | Ford | 21.815 | 123.768 |
| 16 | 5 | Terry Labonte | Hendrick Motorsports | Chevrolet | 21.818 | 123.751 |
| 17 | 77 | Robert Pressley | Jasper Motorsports | Ford | 21.823 | 123.723 |
| 18 | 42 | Joe Nemechek | Team SABCO | Chevrolet | 21.823 | 123.723 |
| 19 | 6 | Mark Martin | Roush Racing | Ford | 21.839 | 123.632 |
| 20 | 90 | Dick Trickle | Donlavey Racing | Ford | 21.868 | 123.468 |
| 21 | 94 | Bill Elliott | Elliott-Marino Racing | Ford | 21.878 | 123.412 |
| 22 | 2 | Rusty Wallace | Penske-Kranefuss Racing | Ford | 21.879 | 123.406 |
| 23 | 36 | Ernie Irvan | MB2 Motorsports | Pontiac | 21.887 | 123.361 |
| 24 | 22 | Ward Burton | Bill Davis Racing | Pontiac | 21.887 | 123.361 |
| 25 | 11 | Brett Bodine | Brett Bodine Racing | Ford | 21.889 | 123.350 |
| 26 | 10 | Ricky Rudd | Rudd Performance Motorsports | Ford | 21.892 | 123.333 |
| 27 | 44 | Kyle Petty | Petty Enterprises | Pontiac | 21.895 | 123.316 |
| 28 | 50 | Randy LaJoie | Hendrick Motorsports | Chevrolet | 21.919 | 123.181 |
| 29 | 43 | John Andretti | Petty Enterprises | Pontiac | 21.927 | 123.136 |
| 30 | 96 | David Green | American Equipment Racing | Chevrolet | 21.936 | 123.085 |
| 31 | 35 | Todd Bodine | ISM Racing | Pontiac | 21.938 | 123.074 |
| 32 | 41 | Steve Grissom | Larry Hedrick Motorsports | Chevrolet | 21.944 | 123.040 |
| 33 | 21 | Michael Waltrip | Mattei Motorsports | Ford | 21.945 | 123.035 |
| 34 | 31 | Mike Skinner | Richard Childress Racing | Chevrolet | 21.959 | 122.956 |
| 35 | 71 | Dave Marcis | Marcis Auto Racing | Chevrolet | 21.965 | 122.923 |
| 36 | 13 | Jerry Nadeau (R) | Elliott-Marino Racing | Ford | 21.967 | 122.912 |
Provisionals
| 37 | 23 | Jimmy Spencer | Travis Carter Enterprises | Ford | -* | -* |
| 38 | 3 | Dale Earnhardt | Richard Childress Racing | Chevrolet | -* | -* |
| 39 | 4 | Bobby Hamilton | Morgan–McClure Motorsports | Chevrolet | -* | -* |
| 40 | 75 | Rick Mast | Butch Mock Motorsports | Ford | -* | -* |
| 41 | 7 | Geoff Bodine | Mattei Motorsports | Ford | -* | -* |
| 42 | 1 | Darrell Waltrip | Dale Earnhardt, Inc. | Chevrolet | -* | -* |
| 43 | 30 | Derrike Cope | Bahari Racing | Pontiac | -* | -* |
Failed to qualify
| 44 | 91 | Kevin Lepage (R) | LJ Racing | Chevrolet | 22.116 | 122.084 |
| 45 | 8 | Buckshot Jones | Stavola Brothers Racing | Chevrolet | 22.756 | 118.650 |
Official qualifying results

*Time not available.

== Race results ==
| Fin | St | # | Driver | Team | Make | Laps | Led | Status | Pts | Winnings |
|---|---|---|---|---|---|---|---|---|---|---|
| 1 | 16 | 5 | Terry Labonte | Hendrick Motorsports | Chevrolet | 400 | 96 | running | 180 | $99,975 |
| 2 | 4 | 88 | Dale Jarrett | Robert Yates Racing | Ford | 400 | 108 | running | 180 | $75,625 |
| 3 | 22 | 2 | Rusty Wallace | Penske-Kranefuss Racing | Ford | 400 | 27 | running | 170 | $56,875 |
| 4 | 7 | 33 | Ken Schrader | Andy Petree Racing | Chevrolet | 400 | 0 | running | 160 | $62,075 |
| 5 | 19 | 6 | Mark Martin | Roush Racing | Ford | 400 | 73 | running | 160 | $65,025 |
| 6 | 15 | 12 | Jeremy Mayfield | Penske-Kranefuss Racing | Ford | 400 | 0 | running | 150 | $39,075 |
| 7 | 13 | 99 | Jeff Burton | Roush Racing | Ford | 400 | 0 | running | 146 | $42,150 |
| 8 | 14 | 18 | Bobby Labonte | Joe Gibbs Racing | Pontiac | 400 | 0 | running | 142 | $43,750 |
| 9 | 11 | 28 | Kenny Irwin Jr. (R) | Robert Yates Racing | Ford | 400 | 0 | running | 138 | $41,850 |
| 10 | 3 | 40 | Sterling Marlin | Team SABCO | Chevrolet | 400 | 81 | running | 139 | $31,300 |
| 11 | 26 | 10 | Ricky Rudd | Rudd Performance Motorsports | Ford | 400 | 0 | running | 130 | $41,900 |
| 12 | 18 | 42 | Joe Nemechek | Team SABCO | Chevrolet | 400 | 0 | running | 127 | $32,750 |
| 13 | 9 | 97 | Chad Little | Roush Racing | Ford | 400 | 0 | running | 124 | $26,175 |
| 14 | 37 | 23 | Jimmy Spencer | Travis Carter Enterprises | Ford | 399 | 0 | running | 121 | $35,675 |
| 15 | 10 | 16 | Ted Musgrave | Roush Racing | Ford | 399 | 0 | running | 118 | $33,735 |
| 16 | 39 | 4 | Bobby Hamilton | Morgan–McClure Motorsports | Chevrolet | 399 | 0 | running | 115 | $35,500 |
| 17 | 20 | 90 | Dick Trickle | Donlavey Racing | Ford | 399 | 0 | running | 112 | $30,800 |
| 18 | 8 | 26 | Johnny Benson Jr. | Roush Racing | Ford | 399 | 12 | running | 114 | $30,450 |
| 19 | 24 | 22 | Ward Burton | Bill Davis Racing | Pontiac | 399 | 0 | running | 106 | $30,225 |
| 20 | 25 | 11 | Brett Bodine | Brett Bodine Racing | Ford | 398 | 0 | running | 103 | $32,150 |
| 21 | 38 | 3 | Dale Earnhardt | Richard Childress Racing | Chevrolet | 398 | 0 | running | 100 | $34,250 |
| 22 | 29 | 43 | John Andretti | Petty Enterprises | Pontiac | 398 | 0 | running | 97 | $34,125 |
| 23 | 5 | 81 | Kenny Wallace | FILMAR Racing | Ford | 398 | 0 | running | 94 | $22,950 |
| 24 | 27 | 44 | Kyle Petty | Petty Enterprises | Pontiac | 398 | 0 | running | 91 | $29,225 |
| 25 | 21 | 94 | Bill Elliott | Elliott-Marino Racing | Ford | 398 | 0 | running | 88 | $29,075 |
| 26 | 12 | 9 | Lake Speed | Melling Racing | Ford | 397 | 0 | running | 85 | $22,450 |
| 27 | 2 | 98 | Rich Bickle | Cale Yarborough Motorsports | Ford | 397 | 0 | running | 82 | $25,425 |
| 28 | 41 | 7 | Geoff Bodine | Mattei Motorsports | Ford | 397 | 0 | running | 79 | $28,600 |
| 29 | 23 | 36 | Ernie Irvan | MB2 Motorsports | Pontiac | 397 | 0 | running | 76 | $28,375 |
| 30 | 34 | 31 | Mike Skinner | Richard Childress Racing | Chevrolet | 396 | 0 | running | 73 | $21,645 |
| 31 | 28 | 50 | Randy LaJoie | Hendrick Motorsports | Chevrolet | 396 | 0 | running | 70 | $27,975 |
| 32 | 42 | 1 | Darrell Waltrip | Dale Earnhardt, Inc. | Chevrolet | 395 | 0 | running | 67 | $20,925 |
| 33 | 30 | 96 | Kevin Lepage (R) | American Equipment Racing | Chevrolet | 390 | 0 | crash | 64 | $20,385 |
| 34 | 43 | 30 | Derrike Cope | Bahari Racing | Pontiac | 390 | 0 | handling | 61 | $24,850 |
| 35 | 31 | 35 | Todd Bodine | ISM Racing | Pontiac | 379 | 0 | running | 58 | $17,825 |
| 36 | 35 | 71 | Dave Marcis | Marcis Auto Racing | Chevrolet | 374 | 0 | running | 55 | $17,800 |
| 37 | 1 | 24 | Jeff Gordon | Hendrick Motorsports | Chevrolet | 372 | 2 | crash | 57 | $44,975 |
| 38 | 36 | 13 | Jerry Nadeau (R) | Elliott-Marino Racing | Ford | 361 | 0 | handling | 49 | $17,750 |
| 39 | 32 | 41 | Steve Grissom | Larry Hedrick Motorsports | Chevrolet | 348 | 0 | running | 46 | $24,725 |
| 40 | 33 | 21 | Michael Waltrip | Mattei Motorsports | Ford | 340 | 1 | crash | 48 | $24,700 |
| 41 | 17 | 77 | Robert Pressley | Jasper Motorsports | Ford | 260 | 0 | running | 40 | $17,675 |
| 42 | 6 | 46 | Jeff Green | Team SABCO | Chevrolet | 183 | 0 | crash | 37 | $17,650 |
| 43 | 40 | 75 | Rick Mast | Butch Mock Motorsports | Ford | 113 | 0 | engine | 34 | $17,650 |
Official race results

| Previous race: 1998 MBNA Platinum 400 | NASCAR Winston Cup Series; 1998 season | Next race: 1998 Miller Lite 400 |
