= Treasure Master =

1991 video game

- Developer: Software Creations
- Publisher: ASC Games
- Composer: Tim Follin
- Platform: NES
- Release: NA: December 1991
- Genre: Platform
- Mode: Single-player

Treasure Master is a platform game released by ASC Games in 1991 for the Nintendo Entertainment System as part of a contest involving MTV. As this contest was only open to American participants, the game was released exclusively in the United States.

== Contest ==
After the game's release in late 1991, players had until 12PM EST on April 11, 1992, to practice beating the game. At this time, MTV revealed a secret password. By entering in this password and the game's serial number before beginning the game, players unlocked a secret sixth Prize World level. After this, players had until midnight to complete the entire game, including the Prize World. This prompted the game to reveal a 24-character code (3HDJL9DNQV2WYTV4S91RXR86). By calling in to a special hotline with this code, players had a chance at winning one of 36,252 prizes. Nickelodeon was also originally participated in the prizes, but later withdrawn and originally had a date of March 14, 1992 before it was postponed to April 11, 1992.

== Music ==
The game's music was composed by Tim Follin. The game's title screen music is a remix of the theme song to the Starsky & Hutch television series.
