= 1998 Miller Lite 400 =

14th race of the 1998 NASCAR Winston Cup Series

Race details
- Race 14 of 33 in the 1998 NASCAR Winston Cup Series
- The 1998 Miller Lite 400 program cover, featuring Rusty Wallace.
- Date: June 14, 1998
- Official name: 30th Annual Miller Lite 400
- Location: Brooklyn, Michigan, Michigan International Speedway
- Course: Permanent racing facility
- Course length: 2 miles (3.2 km)
- Distance: 200 laps, 400 mi (643.737 km)
- Average speed: 158.695 miles per hour (255.395 km/h)

Pole position
Driver	Ward Burton	Bill Davis Racing
- Time: 39.656

Most laps led
Driver	Jeff Gordon	Hendrick Motorsports
- Laps: 132

Winner
No. 6	Mark Martin	Roush Racing

Television in the United States
- Network: CBS
- Announcers: Ken Squier, Dick Berggren, Buddy Baker

Radio in the United States
- Radio: Motor Racing Network

The 1998 Miller Lite 400 was the 14th stock car race of the 1998 NASCAR Winston Cup Series season and the 30th iteration of the event. The race was held on Sunday, June 14, 1998, in Brooklyn, Michigan, at Michigan International Speedway, a two-mile (3.2 km) moderate-banked D-shaped speedway. The race took the scheduled 200 laps to complete. In the late stages of the race, Roush Racing driver Mark Martin was able to dominate to take his 26th career NASCAR Winston Cup Series victory and his fourth of the season. To fill out the podium, Robert Yates Racing driver Dale Jarrett and Hendrick Motorsports driver Jeff Gordon would finish second and third, respectively.

== Background ==
The layout of Michigan International Speedway, the venue where the race was held.

The race was held at Michigan International Speedway, a two-mile (3.2 km) moderate-banked D-shaped speedway located in Brooklyn, Michigan. The track is used primarily for NASCAR events. The track is owned by NASCAR. MIS is recognized as one of motorsports' premier facilities because of its wide racing surface and high banking (by open-wheel standards; the 18-degree banking is modest by stock car standards).

=== Entry list ===
- (R) denotes rookie driver.

#	Driver	Team	Make
1	Darrell Waltrip	Dale Earnhardt, Inc.	Chevrolet
2	Rusty Wallace	Penske-Kranefuss Racing	Ford
3	Dale Earnhardt	Richard Childress Racing	Chevrolet
4	Bobby Hamilton	Morgan–McClure Motorsports	Chevrolet
5	Terry Labonte	Hendrick Motorsports	Chevrolet
6	Mark Martin	Roush Racing	Ford
7	Geoff Bodine	Mattei Motorsports	Ford
8	Morgan Shepherd	Stavola Brothers Racing	Chevrolet
9	Lake Speed	Melling Racing	Ford
10	Ricky Rudd	Rudd Performance Motorsports	Ford
11	Brett Bodine	Brett Bodine Racing	Ford
12	Jeremy Mayfield	Penske-Kranefuss Racing	Ford
13	Jerry Nadeau (R)	Elliott-Marino Racing	Ford
16	Ted Musgrave	Roush Racing	Ford
18	Bobby Labonte	Joe Gibbs Racing	Pontiac
19	Tony Raines	Roehrig Motorsports	Ford
21	Michael Waltrip	Wood Brothers Racing	Ford
22	Ward Burton	Bill Davis Racing	Pontiac
23	Jimmy Spencer	Haas-Carter Motorsports	Ford
24	Jeff Gordon	Hendrick Motorsports	Chevrolet
26	Johnny Benson Jr.	Roush Racing	Ford
28	Kenny Irwin Jr. (R)	Robert Yates Racing	Ford
30	Derrike Cope	Bahari Racing	Pontiac
31	Mike Skinner	Richard Childress Racing	Chevrolet
33	Ken Schrader	Andy Petree Racing	Chevrolet
35	Todd Bodine	ISM Racing	Pontiac
36	Ernie Irvan	MB2 Motorsports	Pontiac
40	Sterling Marlin	Team SABCO	Chevrolet
41	Steve Grissom	Larry Hedrick Motorsports	Chevrolet
42	Joe Nemechek	Team SABCO	Chevrolet
43	John Andretti	Petty Enterprises	Pontiac
44	Kyle Petty	Petty Enterprises	Pontiac
46	Jeff Green	Team SABCO	Chevrolet
50	Wally Dallenbach Jr.	Hendrick Motorsports	Chevrolet
71	Dave Marcis	Marcis Auto Racing	Chevrolet
75	Rick Mast	Butch Mock Motorsports	Ford
77	Robert Pressley	Jasper Motorsports	Ford
78	Gary Bradberry	Triad Motorsports	Ford
81	Kenny Wallace	FILMAR Racing	Ford
88	Dale Jarrett	Robert Yates Racing	Ford
90	Dick Trickle	Donlavey Racing	Ford
91	Kevin Lepage (R)	LJ Racing	Chevrolet
94	Bill Elliott	Elliott-Marino Racing	Ford
96	Hut Stricklin	American Equipment Racing	Chevrolet
97	Chad Little	Roush Racing	Ford
98	Rich Bickle	Cale Yarborough Motorsports	Ford
99	Jeff Burton	Roush Racing	Ford

== Practice ==
=== First practice ===
The first practice session was held on the afternoon of Friday, June 12. Ward Burton, driving for Bill Davis Racing, would set the fastest time in the session, with a lap of 39.678 and an average speed of 181.461 mph (292.033 km/h).

Pos.	#	Driver	Team	Make	Time	Speed
1	22	Ward Burton	Bill Davis Racing	Pontiac	39.678	181.461
2	98	Rich Bickle	Cale Yarborough Motorsports	Ford	39.736	181.196
3	6	Mark Martin	Roush Racing	Ford	39.741	181.173
Full first practice results

=== Final practice ===
The final practice session, sometimes referred to as Happy Hour, was held on the afternoon of Friday, June 13. Jeff Burton, driving for Roush Racing, would set the fastest time in the session, with a lap of 39.985 and an average speed of 180.068 mph (289.791 km/h).

Pos.	#	Driver	Team	Make	Time	Speed
1	99	Jeff Burton	Roush Racing	Ford	39.985	180.068
2	22	Ward Burton	Bill Davis Racing	Pontiac	40.089	179.600
3	24	Jeff Gordon	Hendrick Motorsports	Chevrolet	40.133	179.403
Full Happy Hour practice results

== Qualifying ==
Qualifying was split into two rounds. The first round was held on Friday, June 12, at 3:30 PM EST. Each driver would have one lap to set a time. During the first round, the top 25 drivers in the round would be guaranteed a starting spot in the race. If a driver was not able to guarantee a spot in the first round, they had the option to scrub their time from the first round and try and run a faster lap time in a second round qualifying run, held on Saturday, June 13, at 11:15 AM EST. As with the first round, each driver would have one lap to set a time. On January 24, 1998, NASCAR would announce that the amount of provisionals given would be increased from last season. Positions 26-36 would be decided on time, while positions 37-43 would be based on provisionals. Six spots are awarded by the use of provisionals based on owner's points. The seventh is awarded to a past champion who has not otherwise qualified for the race. If no past champion needs the provisional, the next team in the owner points will be awarded a provisional.

Ward Burton, driving for Bill Davis Racing, would win the pole, setting a time of 39.656 and an average speed of 181.561 miles per hour (292.194 km/h).

Four drivers would fail to qualify: Derrike Cope, Tony Raines, Dave Marcis, and Todd Bodine.

=== Full qualifying results ===
Pos.	#	Driver	Team	Make	Time	Speed
1	22	Ward Burton	Bill Davis Racing	Pontiac	39.656	181.561
2	88	Dale Jarrett	Robert Yates Racing	Ford	39.733	181.210
3	2	Rusty Wallace	Penske-Kranefuss Racing	Ford	39.761	181.082
4	24	Jeff Gordon	Hendrick Motorsports	Chevrolet	39.797	180.918
5	91	Kevin Lepage (R)	LJ Racing	Chevrolet	39.801	180.900
6	94	Bill Elliott	Elliott-Marino Racing	Ford	39.831	180.764
7	6	Mark Martin	Roush Racing	Ford	39.839	180.727
8	50	Wally Dallenbach Jr.	Hendrick Motorsports	Chevrolet	39.849	180.682
9	10	Ricky Rudd	Rudd Performance Motorsports	Ford	39.872	180.578
10	99	Jeff Burton	Roush Racing	Ford	39.879	180.546
11	5	Terry Labonte	Hendrick Motorsports	Chevrolet	39.899	180.456
12	1	Darrell Waltrip	Dale Earnhardt, Inc.	Chevrolet	39.915	180.383
13	9	Lake Speed	Melling Racing	Ford	39.935	180.293
14	28	Kenny Irwin Jr. (R)	Robert Yates Racing	Ford	39.955	180.203
15	12	Jeremy Mayfield	Penske-Kranefuss Racing	Ford	39.961	180.176
16	42	Joe Nemechek	Team SABCO	Chevrolet	39.998	180.009
17	18	Bobby Labonte	Joe Gibbs Racing	Pontiac	40.004	179.982
18	98	Rich Bickle	Cale Yarborough Motorsports	Ford	40.048	179.784
19	4	Bobby Hamilton	Morgan–McClure Motorsports	Chevrolet	40.056	179.748
20	7	Geoff Bodine	Mattei Motorsports	Ford	40.068	179.695
21	26	Johnny Benson Jr.	Roush Racing	Ford	40.094	179.578
22	16	Ted Musgrave	Roush Racing	Ford	40.094	179.578
23	81	Kenny Wallace	FILMAR Racing	Ford	40.118	179.471
24	21	Michael Waltrip	Wood Brothers Racing	Ford	40.170	179.238
25	3	Dale Earnhardt	Richard Childress Racing	Chevrolet	40.188	179.158
26	8	Morgan Shepherd	Stavola Brothers Racing	Chevrolet	39.360	182.927
27	13	Jerry Nadeau (R)	Elliott-Marino Racing	Ford	39.541	182.089
28	75	Rick Mast	Butch Mock Motorsports	Ford	39.753	181.118
29	11	Brett Bodine	Brett Bodine Racing	Ford	39.768	181.050
30	23	Jimmy Spencer	Travis Carter Enterprises	Ford	39.770	181.041
31	46	Jeff Green	Team SABCO	Chevrolet	39.790	180.950
32	36	Ernie Irvan	MB2 Motorsports	Pontiac	39.831	180.764
33	43	John Andretti	Petty Enterprises	Pontiac	39.839	180.727
34	33	Ken Schrader	Andy Petree Racing	Chevrolet	39.851	180.673
35	78	Gary Bradberry	Triad Motorsports	Ford	39.862	180.623
36	40	Sterling Marlin	Team SABCO	Chevrolet	39.866	180.605
Provisionals
37	97	Chad Little	Roush Racing	Ford	-*	-*
38	90	Dick Trickle	Donlavey Racing	Ford	-*	-*
39	41	Steve Grissom	Larry Hedrick Motorsports	Chevrolet	-*	-*
40	77	Robert Pressley	Jasper Motorsports	Ford	-*	-*
41	31	Mike Skinner	Richard Childress Racing	Chevrolet	-*	-*
42	44	Kyle Petty	Petty Enterprises	Pontiac	-*	-*
43	96	Hut Stricklin	American Equipment Racing	Chevrolet	-*	-*
Failed to qualify
44	30	Derrike Cope	Bahari Racing	Pontiac	39.958	180.189
45	19	Tony Raines	Roehrig Motorsports	Ford	40.031	179.861
46	71	Dave Marcis	Marcis Auto Racing	Chevrolet	40.169	179.243
47	35	Todd Bodine	ISM Racing	Pontiac	40.413	178.160
Official qualifying results

== Race results ==
Fin	St	#	Driver	Team	Make	Laps	Led	Status	Pts	Winnings
1	7	6	Mark Martin	Roush Racing	Ford	200	48	running	180	$92,375
2	2	88	Dale Jarrett	Robert Yates Racing	Ford	200	1	running	175	$76,125
3	4	24	Jeff Gordon	Hendrick Motorsports	Chevrolet	200	132	running	175	$84,375
4	10	99	Jeff Burton	Roush Racing	Ford	200	2	running	165	$54,235
5	15	12	Jeremy Mayfield	Penske-Kranefuss Racing	Ford	200	0	running	155	$44,500
6	6	94	Bill Elliott	Elliott-Marino Racing	Ford	200	3	running	155	$50,075
7	17	18	Bobby Labonte	Joe Gibbs Racing	Pontiac	200	0	running	146	$47,675
8	1	22	Ward Burton	Bill Davis Racing	Pontiac	200	6	running	147	$44,675
9	16	42	Joe Nemechek	Team SABCO	Chevrolet	200	0	running	138	$37,525
10	8	50	Wally Dallenbach Jr.	Hendrick Motorsports	Chevrolet	200	4	running	139	$42,675
11	30	23	Jimmy Spencer	Travis Carter Enterprises	Ford	199	2	running	135	$41,225
12	12	1	Darrell Waltrip	Dale Earnhardt, Inc.	Chevrolet	199	2	running	132	$27,400
13	14	28	Kenny Irwin Jr. (R)	Robert Yates Racing	Ford	199	0	running	124	$39,150
14	32	36	Ernie Irvan	MB2 Motorsports	Pontiac	199	0	running	121	$33,900
15	25	3	Dale Earnhardt	Richard Childress Racing	Chevrolet	199	0	running	118	$38,650
16	37	97	Chad Little	Roush Racing	Ford	199	0	running	115	$27,925
17	3	2	Rusty Wallace	Penske-Kranefuss Racing	Ford	199	0	running	112	$36,900
18	36	40	Sterling Marlin	Team SABCO	Chevrolet	199	0	running	109	$24,865
19	11	5	Terry Labonte	Hendrick Motorsports	Chevrolet	199	0	running	106	$36,950
20	33	43	John Andretti	Petty Enterprises	Pontiac	198	0	running	103	$36,935
21	24	21	Michael Waltrip	Wood Brothers Racing	Ford	198	0	running	100	$33,215
22	21	26	Johnny Benson Jr.	Roush Racing	Ford	198	0	running	97	$30,900
23	20	7	Geoff Bodine	Mattei Motorsports	Ford	198	0	running	94	$31,265
24	38	90	Dick Trickle	Donlavey Racing	Ford	198	0	running	91	$30,755
25	13	9	Lake Speed	Melling Racing	Ford	198	0	running	88	$23,220
26	22	16	Ted Musgrave	Roush Racing	Ford	198	0	running	85	$29,960
27	18	98	Rich Bickle	Cale Yarborough Motorsports	Ford	197	0	running	82	$26,800
28	34	33	Ken Schrader	Andy Petree Racing	Chevrolet	197	0	running	79	$29,740
29	41	31	Mike Skinner	Richard Childress Racing	Chevrolet	197	0	running	76	$22,605
30	31	46	Jeff Green	Team SABCO	Chevrolet	197	0	running	73	$19,540
31	28	75	Rick Mast	Butch Mock Motorsports	Ford	197	0	running	70	$21,910
32	40	77	Robert Pressley	Jasper Motorsports	Ford	197	0	running	67	$19,340
33	29	11	Brett Bodine	Brett Bodine Racing	Ford	197	0	running	64	$26,235
34	35	78	Gary Bradberry	Triad Motorsports	Ford	195	0	running	61	$19,165
35	27	13	Jerry Nadeau (R)	Elliott-Marino Racing	Ford	195	0	running	58	$19,095
36	42	44	Kyle Petty	Petty Enterprises	Pontiac	195	0	running	55	$26,050
37	9	10	Ricky Rudd	Rudd Performance Motorsports	Ford	195	0	running	52	$35,390
38	19	4	Bobby Hamilton	Morgan–McClure Motorsports	Chevrolet	194	0	running	49	$33,880
39	23	81	Kenny Wallace	FILMAR Racing	Ford	194	0	running	46	$18,880
40	5	91	Kevin Lepage (R)	LJ Racing	Chevrolet	192	0	running	43	$18,880
41	39	41	Steve Grissom	Larry Hedrick Motorsports	Chevrolet	188	0	running	40	$25,880
42	43	96	Hut Stricklin	American Equipment Racing	Chevrolet	121	0	crash	37	$21,380
43	26	8	Morgan Shepherd	Stavola Brothers Racing	Chevrolet	66	0	electrical	34	$19,380
Official race results

== Media ==
=== Television ===
The Miller Lite 400 was covered by CBS in the United States for the sixteenth straight year. Mike Joy, two-time NASCAR Cup Series champion Ned Jarrett and 1979 race winner Buddy Baker called the race from the broadcast booth. Dick Berggren, Ralph Sheheen and Bill Stephens handled pit road for the television side. Ken Squier would serve as host.

CBS
Host	Booth announcers		Pit reporters
Host	Lap-by-lap	Color-commentators	Pit reporters
Ken Squier	Mike Joy	Ned Jarrett; Buddy Baker	Dick Berggren; Ralph Sheheen; Bill Stephens

Previous race: 1998 Pontiac Excitement 400	NASCAR Winston Cup Series; 1998 season	Next race: 1998 Pocono 500
