= One (video game) =

1997 video game

- North American cover art
- Developer: Visual Concepts
- Publishers: NA: ASC Games; EU: Take-Two Interactive; JP: Capcom
- Director: Scott Patterson
- Programmers: Tim Meekins; Ronald Pieket-Weeserik
- Composer: Mark Chosak
- Platform: PlayStation
- Release: NA: December 11, 1997; PAL: March 1998; JP: March 25, 1999
- Genre: Third-person shooter
- Mode: Single-player

One is a video game released for the Sony PlayStation in 1997. The player controls John Cain, a man who awakes with no memory and one of his arms replaced by a gun, through a series of three-dimensional action stages. One was met with divisive reviews from critics, with some lauding its visuals, level designs, and cinematic feel, while others argued that frustrations with the gameplay ruin what had been a promising game. The game was released as a PSone Classic for download on the PlayStation Network on March 18, 2010.

== Gameplay ==
One is a linear 3D platform shooter with a dynamic camera that automatically shifts perspectives with the action.

In lieu of power-ups, the player builds the "rage meter" by killing enemies. Building the rage meter increases their character's abilities, in some cases in ways that are necessary to advance through the levels.

There are six levels in total with a boss at the end of each, most of whom cannot be dispatched by direct gunfire and instead must be defeated by usage of the surrounding environment.

== Plot ==
The goal of One is for the player to discover the identity of the main character John Cain. The only clue available is a barcode on the player-character's neck. At the beginning of the game, John Cain awakens on the floor of an apartment building, with a gun in place of one arm, no memory, and police helicopters shooting missiles through a window. Meanwhile, the player character is pursued across the city and country-side by military and police forces who are apparently intending to kill Cain, and have mistaken the player character for him. To combat the police and military forces and other enemies, the player has the option to use Cain's newly installed arm cannon, or rely on more traditional fighting weapons like punch and kicking combos.

== Development and release ==
Visual Concepts president Greg Thomas stated, "The whole idea behind this game was to take the kind of hard-hitting fast pace you used to see in side-scrolling platform games and translate those values into a 3D game."

The game uses asynchronous loading, a common PlayStation technique which makes the game load data into the console's RAM during play, thus preventing the game from having to pause for load times.

The game was published in Japan by Capcom on March 25, 1999.

A sequel was planned for development, but it was cancelled due to financial troubles at ASC Games.

== Reception ==
Reception

Aggregate score
Aggregator	Score
GameRankings	76%

Review scores
Publication	Score
AllGame	3.5/5
CNET Gamecenter	7/10
Edge	6/10
Electronic Gaming Monthly	7.5/10 (Note: Four critics of Electronic Gaming Monthly gave the game 8.5/10, 7.5/10, 7/10, and 7/10.)
Famitsu	23/40
Game Informer	8.5/10
GameFan	97% (Note: Three critics of GameFan gave the game each a score of 96, 98, and 97.)
GameRevolution	B
GameSpot	7.6/10
IGN	5/10
Next Generation	2/5
Official U.S. PlayStation Magazine	4/5

Shawn Smith of Electronic Gaming Monthly selected One as his pick for "Sleeper Hit of the Holidays", praising the originality of mechanics such as the rage meter and saying the game "brings back some of the feel of the Super NES Contra games - and does it well on a 32-bit machine to boot." Upon the game's release he gave a similarly laudatory review, particularly commenting on the cinematic aspects of the level designs and how each one starts from the location where the previous one left off. However, his three co-reviewers all found One is good but could have been better, with Dan Hsu criticizing the frame rate, Kraig Kujawa the unrefined and unfairly difficult gameplay, and Ken "Sushi-X" Williams the predictable patterns of the enemies. Adam Douglas of IGN felt the difficulty of the game combined with the frustration of the infrequent save points completely overrides the strong graphics and premise, making it not fun to play. In contrast, Dave Toister of GameSpot said One is "a terrific game from beginning to end", opining that cinematic touches to the level design and voice overs make it one of the few genuinely successful attempts at making a video game feel like being in a big-budget action movie.

Critics widely praised the graphics, especially the explosions and the lighting effects. However, they also uniformly complained at issues with the jumping, specifically poorly timed changes in the camera angle which throw off the context-sensitive directional controls, and massive explosions blocking the player's view and forcing them to jump blindly. Toister acknowledged that the jumping is difficult but found it to be a surmountable hurdle. GamePro likewise said that the stunning visuals and intense action outweigh the problems, calling it "some of the most intense action and shooting this side of MDK." (Note: GamePro gave the game 4.5/5 for fun factor, graphics, and sound and 4/5 for control.) Next Generation said that the game "had a lot of promise. If only ASC could've gotten the graphics and the control in sync. But then that's the trick, isn't it?"
