= TNN Outdoors Pro Hunter =

1998 video game

- Developer: DreamForge Intertainment
- Publisher: ASC Games
- Engine: Unreal Engine 1
- Platform: Microsoft Windows
- Release: NA: November 19, 1998
- Genre: Sports
- Modes: Single-player, multiplayer

TNN Outdoors Pro Hunter is a sports game developed by DreamForge Intertainment and published by ASC Games for Microsoft Windows in 1998. A sequel, TNN Outdoors Pro Hunter 2, was released in 1999 developed by Monolith Productions using their LithTech engine.

== Reception ==
Reception

Review scores
Publication	Score
CNET Gamecenter	7/10
Computer Games Strategy Plus	2/5
Computer Gaming World	1/5
EP Daily	7.5/10
GameSpot	7.2/10
PC Accelerator	2/10
PC Gamer (US)	67%

The game received mixed to unfavorable reviews from critics.
