= Mass Destruction (video game) =

1997 video game

- Developer: NMS Software
- Publishers: ASC Games; BMG Interactive
- Composer: Peter Connelly
- Platforms: Sega Saturn, MS-DOS, PlayStation
- Release: MS-DOS: NA: 11 November 1997; Saturn: EU: 27 March 1997; NA: 14 November 1997; JP: 20 November 1997; PlayStation: NA: 26 November 1997; EU: November 1997
- Genre: Action
- Mode: Single-player

Mass Destruction is a 1997 action game developed by NMS Software and published by ASC Games and BMG Interactive. Released for MS-DOS, the Sega Saturn, and the PlayStation, the game puts players in control of a tank, and tasks them with destroying enemy forces. It has often been likened to Return Fire.

The MS-DOS version was developed first, with the console versions following later. BMG Interactive initially stated that the game would be retitled "Tank" for its European release, but the game ultimately retained its original title of Mass Destruction on all releases. BMG closed down its U.S. operations shortly before the game was to be released, and subsequently sold the U.S. publication rights for Mass Destruction to ASC Games.

== Gameplay ==
Mass Destruction is a single-player only game. The player takes control of a tank, which is viewed from an overhead perspective, and undertakes various missions in which the objective is to destroy a specific object in their environment, while avoiding being killed by the enemy forces. The player chooses from three models of tank: one which moves fast but has weak armor, one which moves slowly but has heavy armor, and one which is a moderate mix of both assets. The tank has a selection of weapons, some with limited ammunition. The gun turret can be rotated independently of the tank's movement, allowing the player to proceed in one direction while firing in another.

In addition to a primary objective, each mission has optional secondary objectives which award the player bonus points if completed. These points may also unlock bonus missions.

== Reception ==
Reception

Review scores
Publication	Score		
Publication	PC	PS	Saturn
AllGame	N/A	3.5/5	3.5/5
CNET Gamecenter	N/A	7/10	8/10
Computer Gaming World	2/5	N/A	N/A
Edge	N/A	N/A	6/10
Electronic Gaming Monthly	N/A	7.5/10, 5.5/10, 5.5/10, 6.5/10.	8.5/10, 7/10, 6/10, 5.5/10
Famitsu	N/A	N/A	24/40
Game Informer	N/A	5.5/10	5.5/10
GameFan	N/A	N/A	83% (Note: In GameFan's early viewpoint of the Saturn version, two critics gave it each a score of 84, and the other 82.)
GameSpot	7.3/10	7.9/10	N/A
IGN	N/A	7/10	N/A
Next Generation	N/A	N/A	3/5
PC Gamer (US)	76%	N/A	N/A
Saturn Power	N/A	N/A	71%
Sega Saturn Magazine	N/A	N/A	87%

While some reviewers described the game as "simplistic" and "mindless", most found its stripped-down action enjoyable. The lack of a multiplayer option was widely criticized. GamePro said the missions eventually become somewhat monotonous, but the game is "uninhibited destructive fun that's worth at least a shot as a weekend rental." (Note: GamePro gave the PlayStation version 3/5 for graphics, 2.5/5 for sound, and two 3.5/5 scores for control and fun factor.) Next Generation similarly stated that "MD is a solid, beautiful, and fun game to play, but only if played in short, controlled bursts." James Price of Saturn Power criticized that much less strategy is required to survive missions than in similar games such as Soviet Strike, while Lee Nutter argued in Sega Saturn Magazine that Mass Destruction is intended as a game of achieving high scores rather than simple completion of the campaign. Jeff Gerstmann commented in GameSpot, "The mission-based gameplay brings a method to the madness, but one still gets the happy feeling of cruising around aimlessly in a tank and blowing up as many things as possible, friend or foe." IGN said the game's best aspect is the fact that virtually everything in it is destructible.

Though most reviewers did not compare versions of the game, three of Electronic Gaming Monthly's four reviewers scored the Saturn version higher than the PlayStation version, saying it has much sharper graphics and shorter load times. Next Generation said the Saturn version has better control and animation effects, though they noted it lacks the building transparencies seen in the PlayStation version. GamePro's review said that the game was "fast, fun, and stress-relieving. If hardcore war sims [...] are too peaceful for you, Mass Destruction will fire you up for combat again." (Note: GamePro gave the Saturn version 4/5 for graphics, two 4.5/5 scores for sound and control, and a perfect 5/5 for fun factor.) CNET Gamecenter and GameFan gave the game favorable reviews, while Edge gave it a mixed review, many months before it was released.
