= 1998 MBNA Platinum 400 =

12th race of the 1998 NASCAR Winston Cup Series

Race details
- Race 12 of 33 in the 1998 NASCAR Winston Cup Series
- The 1998 MBNA Platinum 400 program cover.
- Date: May 31, 1998
- Official name: 30th Annual MBNA Platinum 400
- Location: Dover, Delaware, Dover International Speedway
- Course: Permanent racing facility
- Course length: 1 miles (1.6 km)
- Distance: 400 laps, 400 mi (643.737 km)
- Average speed: 120.603 miles per hour (194.092 km/h)

Pole position
Driver	Rusty Wallace	Penske-Kranefuss Racing
- Time: 23.092

Most laps led
Driver	Jeff Gordon	Hendrick Motorsports
- Laps: 375

Winner
No. 88	Dale Jarrett	Robert Yates Racing

Television in the United States
- Network: TNN
- Announcers: Eli Gold, Dick Berggren, Buddy Baker

Radio in the United States
- Radio: Motor Racing Network

The 1998 MBNA Platinum 400 was the 12th stock car race of the 1998 NASCAR Winston Cup Series season and the 30th iteration of the event. The race was held on Sunday, May 31, 1998, in Dover, Delaware at Dover International Speedway, a 1-mile (1.6 km) permanent oval-shaped racetrack. The race took the scheduled 400 laps to complete. Within the final laps of the race, Robert Yates Racing driver Dale Jarrett would manage to save enough fuel and overtake the dominant driver of the race, Hendrick Motorsports driver Jeff Gordon to take his 17th career NASCAR Winston Cup Series victory and his second victory of the season. To fill out the podium, Roush Racing driver Jeff Burton and Jeff Gordon would finish second and third, respectively.

== Background ==
The layout of Dover International Speedway, the venue where the race was held.

Dover International Speedway is an oval race track in Dover, Delaware. The track features one layout, a 1-mile (1.6 km) concrete oval, with 24° banking in the turns and 9° banking on the straights. The speedway is owned and operated by Speedway Motorsports.

The track, nicknamed "The Monster Mile", was built in 1969 by Melvin Joseph of Melvin L. Joseph Construction Company, Inc., with an asphalt surface, but was replaced with concrete in 1995. Six years later in 2001, the track's capacity moved to 135,000 seats, making the track have the largest capacity of sports venue in the mid-Atlantic. In 2002, the name changed to Dover International Speedway from Dover Downs International Speedway after Dover Downs Gaming and Entertainment split, making Dover Motorsports. From 2007 to 2009, the speedway worked on an improvement project called "The Monster Makeover", which expanded facilities at the track and beautified the track. After the 2014 season, the track's capacity was reduced to 95,500 seats.

=== Entry list ===
- (R) denotes rookie driver.

#	Driver	Team	Make
1	Darrell Waltrip	Dale Earnhardt, Inc.	Chevrolet
2	Rusty Wallace	Penske-Kranefuss Racing	Ford
3	Dale Earnhardt	Richard Childress Racing	Chevrolet
4	Bobby Hamilton	Morgan–McClure Motorsports	Chevrolet
5	Terry Labonte	Hendrick Motorsports	Chevrolet
6	Mark Martin	Roush Racing	Ford
7	Geoff Bodine	Mattei Motorsports	Ford
8	Buckshot Jones	Stavola Brothers Racing	Chevrolet
9	Lake Speed	Melling Racing	Ford
10	Ricky Rudd	Rudd Performance Motorsports	Ford
11	Brett Bodine	Brett Bodine Racing	Ford
12	Jeremy Mayfield	Penske-Kranefuss Racing	Ford
13	Dennis Setzer	Elliott-Marino Racing	Ford
16	Ted Musgrave	Roush Racing	Ford
18	Bobby Labonte	Joe Gibbs Racing	Pontiac
21	Michael Waltrip	Wood Brothers Racing	Ford
22	Ward Burton	Bill Davis Racing	Pontiac
23	Jimmy Spencer	Haas-Carter Motorsports	Ford
24	Jeff Gordon	Hendrick Motorsports	Chevrolet
26	Johnny Benson Jr.	Roush Racing	Ford
28	Kenny Irwin Jr. (R)	Robert Yates Racing	Ford
30	Derrike Cope	Bahari Racing	Pontiac
31	Mike Skinner	Richard Childress Racing	Chevrolet
33	Ken Schrader	Andy Petree Racing	Chevrolet
35	Todd Bodine	ISM Racing	Pontiac
36	Ernie Irvan	MB2 Motorsports	Pontiac
40	Sterling Marlin	Team SABCO	Chevrolet
41	Steve Grissom	Larry Hedrick Motorsports	Chevrolet
42	Joe Nemechek	Team SABCO	Chevrolet
43	John Andretti	Petty Enterprises	Pontiac
44	Kyle Petty	Petty Enterprises	Pontiac
46	Wally Dallenbach Jr.	Team SABCO	Chevrolet
50	Randy LaJoie	Hendrick Motorsports	Chevrolet
71	Dave Marcis	Marcis Auto Racing	Chevrolet
75	Rick Mast	Butch Mock Motorsports	Ford
77	Robert Pressley	Jasper Motorsports	Ford
78	Gary Bradberry	Triad Motorsports	Ford
81	Kenny Wallace	FILMAR Racing	Ford
88	Dale Jarrett	Robert Yates Racing	Ford
90	Dick Trickle	Donlavey Racing	Ford
91	Kevin Lepage (R)	LJ Racing	Chevrolet
94	Bill Elliott	Elliott-Marino Racing	Ford
96	David Green	American Equipment Racing	Chevrolet
97	Chad Little	Roush Racing	Ford
98	Rich Bickle	Cale Yarborough Motorsports	Ford
99	Jeff Burton	Roush Racing	Ford

== Practice ==
=== First practice ===
The first practice session was held on the early afternoon of Friday, May 29. Rick Mast, driving for Butch Mock Motorsports, would set the fastest time in the session, with a lap of 23.281 and an average speed of 154.633 miles per hour (248.858 km/h).

Pos.	#	Driver	Team	Make	Time	Speed
1	75	Rick Mast	Butch Mock Motorsports	Ford	23.281	154.633
2	2	Rusty Wallace	Penske-Kranefuss Racing	Ford	23.291	154.566
3	6	Mark Martin	Roush Racing	Ford	23.421	153.708
Full first practice results

=== Second practice ===
The second practice session was held on the late afternoon of Friday, May 29. Mark Martin, driving for Roush Racing, would set the fastest time in the session, with a lap of 23.168 and an average speed of 155.387 miles per hour (250.071 km/h).

Pos.	#	Driver	Team	Make	Time	Speed
1	6	Mark Martin	Roush Racing	Ford	23.168	155.387
2	12	Jeremy Mayfield	Penske-Kranefuss Racing	Ford	23.229	154.979
3	24	Jeff Gordon	Hendrick Motorsports	Chevrolet	23.250	154.839
Full second practice results

=== Final practice ===
The final practice session, sometimes referred to as Happy Hour, was held on the afternoon of Saturday, May 30. Mark Martin, driving for Roush Racing, would set the fastest time in the session, with a lap of 23.919 and an average speed of 150.508 miles per hour (242.219 km/h).

Pos.	#	Driver	Team	Make	Time	Speed
1	6	Mark Martin	Roush Racing	Ford	23.919	150.508
2	90	Dick Trickle	Donlavey Racing	Ford	23.998	150.013
3	42	Joe Nemechek	Team SABCO	Chevrolet	24.000	150.000
Full Happy Hour practice results

== Qualifying ==
Qualifying was split into two rounds. The first round was held on Friday, May 29, at 3:30 PM EST. Each driver would have one lap to set a time. During the first round, the top 25 drivers in the round would be guaranteed a starting spot in the race. If a driver was not able to guarantee a spot in the first round, they had the option to scrub their time from the first round and try and run a faster lap time in a second round qualifying run, held on Saturday, May 30, at 11:30 AM EST. As with the first round, each driver would have one lap to set a time. On January 24, 1998, NASCAR would announce that the amount of provisionals given would be increased from last season. Positions 26-36 would be decided on time, while positions 37-43 would be based on provisionals. Six spots are awarded by the use of provisionals based on owner's points. The seventh is awarded to a past champion who has not otherwise qualified for the race. If no past champion needs the provisional, the next team in the owner points will be awarded a provisional.

Rusty Wallace, driving for Penske-Kranefuss Racing, would win the pole, setting a time of 23.092 and an average speed of 155.898 miles per hour (250.894 km/h).

Three drivers would fail to qualify: Dennis Setzer, Morgan Shepherd, and Todd Bodine.

=== Full qualifying results ===
Pos.	#	Driver	Team	Make	Time	Speed
1	2	Rusty Wallace	Penske-Kranefuss Racing	Ford	23.092	155.898
2	24	Jeff Gordon	Hendrick Motorsports	Chevrolet	23.220	155.039
3	6	Mark Martin	Roush Racing	Ford	23.224	155.012
4	88	Dale Jarrett	Robert Yates Racing	Ford	23.270	154.706
5	10	Ricky Rudd	Rudd Performance Motorsports	Ford	23.281	154.633
6	42	Joe Nemechek	Team SABCO	Chevrolet	23.301	154.500
7	75	Rick Mast	Butch Mock Motorsports	Ford	23.304	154.480
8	36	Ernie Irvan	MB2 Motorsports	Pontiac	23.405	153.813
9	28	Kenny Irwin Jr. (R)	Robert Yates Racing	Ford	23.423	153.695
10	22	Ward Burton	Bill Davis Racing	Pontiac	23.493	153.237
11	9	Lake Speed	Melling Racing	Ford	23.508	153.139
12	12	Jeremy Mayfield	Penske-Kranefuss Racing	Ford	23.512	153.113
13	90	Dick Trickle	Donlavey Racing	Ford	23.517	153.081
14	26	Johnny Benson Jr.	Roush Racing	Ford	23.526	153.022
15	23	Jimmy Spencer	Travis Carter Enterprises	Ford	23.545	152.899
16	43	John Andretti	Petty Enterprises	Pontiac	23.550	152.866
17	5	Terry Labonte	Hendrick Motorsports	Chevrolet	23.556	152.827
18	31	Mike Skinner	Richard Childress Racing	Chevrolet	23.564	152.775
19	8	Buckshot Jones	Stavola Brothers Racing	Chevrolet	23.578	152.685
20	40	Sterling Marlin	Team SABCO	Chevrolet	23.581	152.665
21	21	Michael Waltrip	Wood Brothers Racing	Ford	23.599	152.549
22	16	Ted Musgrave	Roush Racing	Ford	23.599	152.549
23	77	Robert Pressley	Jasper Motorsports	Ford	23.599	152.549
24	94	Bill Elliott	Elliott-Marino Racing	Ford	23.603	152.523
25	33	Ken Schrader	Andy Petree Racing	Chevrolet	23.613	152.458
26	7	Geoff Bodine	Mattei Motorsports	Ford	23.406	153.807
27	98	Rich Bickle	Cale Yarborough Motorsports	Ford	23.567	152.756
28	44	Kyle Petty	Petty Enterprises	Pontiac	23.614	152.452
29	11	Brett Bodine	Brett Bodine Racing	Ford	23.624	152.387
30	96	David Green	American Equipment Racing	Chevrolet	23.629	152.355
31	81	Kenny Wallace	FILMAR Racing	Ford	23.635	152.316
32	30	Derrike Cope	Bahari Racing	Pontiac	23.642	152.271
33	71	Dave Marcis	Marcis Auto Racing	Chevrolet	23.651	152.213
34	3	Dale Earnhardt	Richard Childress Racing	Chevrolet	23.670	152.091
35	78	Gary Bradberry	Triad Motorsports	Ford	23.670	152.091
36	18	Bobby Labonte	Joe Gibbs Racing	Pontiac	23.676	152.053
Provisionals
37	99	Jeff Burton	Roush Racing	Ford	-*	-*
38	4	Bobby Hamilton	Morgan–McClure Motorsports	Chevrolet	-*	-*
39	97	Chad Little	Roush Racing	Ford	-*	-*
40	50	Randy LaJoie	Hendrick Motorsports	Chevrolet	-*	-*
41	41	Steve Grissom	Larry Hedrick Motorsports	Chevrolet	-*	-*
42	91	Kevin Lepage (R)	LJ Racing	Chevrolet	-*	-*
Champion's Provisional
43	1	Darrell Waltrip	Dale Earnhardt, Inc.	Chevrolet	-*	-*
Failed to qualify
44	13	Dennis Setzer	Elliott-Marino Racing	Ford	23.740	151.643
45	46	Morgan Shepherd	Team SABCO	Chevrolet	23.826	151.095
46	35	Todd Bodine	ISM Racing	Pontiac	23.936	150.401
Official qualifying results

*Time not available.

== Race results ==
Fin	St	#	Driver	Team	Make	Laps	Led	Status	Pts	Winnings
1	4	88	Dale Jarrett	Robert Yates Racing	Ford	400	8	running	180	$89,950
2	37	99	Jeff Burton	Roush Racing	Ford	400	9	running	175	$62,250
3	2	24	Jeff Gordon	Hendrick Motorsports	Chevrolet	400	375	running	175	$79,350
4	36	18	Bobby Labonte	Joe Gibbs Racing	Pontiac	400	0	running	160	$55,500
5	12	12	Jeremy Mayfield	Penske-Kranefuss Racing	Ford	399	0	running	155	$42,325
6	5	10	Ricky Rudd	Rudd Performance Motorsports	Ford	399	1	running	155	$49,275
7	3	6	Mark Martin	Roush Racing	Ford	399	3	running	151	$40,780
8	19	8	Buckshot Jones	Stavola Brothers Racing	Chevrolet	399	0	running	142	$26,580
9	8	36	Ernie Irvan	MB2 Motorsports	Pontiac	398	0	running	138	$35,130
10	17	5	Terry Labonte	Hendrick Motorsports	Chevrolet	398	0	running	134	$43,430
11	7	75	Rick Mast	Butch Mock Motorsports	Ford	398	0	running	130	$28,455
12	16	43	John Andretti	Petty Enterprises	Pontiac	398	0	running	127	$36,255
13	24	94	Bill Elliott	Elliott-Marino Racing	Ford	398	0	running	124	$31,165
14	21	21	Michael Waltrip	Wood Brothers Racing	Ford	397	0	running	121	$31,655
15	25	33	Ken Schrader	Andy Petree Racing	Chevrolet	397	0	running	118	$32,905
16	29	11	Brett Bodine	Brett Bodine Racing	Ford	397	0	running	115	$30,780
17	38	4	Bobby Hamilton	Morgan–McClure Motorsports	Chevrolet	397	0	running	112	$33,795
18	1	2	Rusty Wallace	Penske-Kranefuss Racing	Ford	397	3	running	114	$39,680
19	20	40	Sterling Marlin	Team SABCO	Chevrolet	396	0	running	106	$22,655
20	43	1	Darrell Waltrip	Dale Earnhardt, Inc.	Chevrolet	396	0	running	103	$23,955
21	13	90	Dick Trickle	Donlavey Racing	Ford	396	0	running	100	$29,955
22	22	16	Ted Musgrave	Roush Racing	Ford	396	0	running	97	$29,305
23	26	7	Geoff Bodine	Mattei Motorsports	Ford	396	0	running	94	$29,455
24	15	23	Jimmy Spencer	Travis Carter Enterprises	Ford	395	1	running	96	$29,305
25	34	3	Dale Earnhardt	Richard Childress Racing	Chevrolet	395	0	running	88	$33,205
26	6	42	Joe Nemechek	Team SABCO	Chevrolet	394	0	running	85	$28,555
27	18	31	Mike Skinner	Richard Childress Racing	Chevrolet	394	0	running	82	$21,405
28	42	91	Kevin Lepage (R)	LJ Racing	Chevrolet	394	0	running	79	$22,255
29	10	22	Ward Burton	Bill Davis Racing	Pontiac	393	0	running	76	$28,105
30	33	71	Dave Marcis	Marcis Auto Racing	Chevrolet	393	0	running	73	$17,955
31	27	98	Rich Bickle	Cale Yarborough Motorsports	Ford	392	0	running	70	$24,905
32	41	41	Steve Grissom	Larry Hedrick Motorsports	Chevrolet	392	0	running	67	$27,845
33	9	28	Kenny Irwin Jr. (R)	Robert Yates Racing	Ford	391	0	running	64	$32,795
34	35	78	Gary Bradberry	Triad Motorsports	Ford	391	0	running	61	$17,745
35	32	30	Derrike Cope	Bahari Racing	Pontiac	390	0	running	58	$27,545
36	11	9	Lake Speed	Melling Racing	Ford	390	0	running	55	$20,030
37	39	97	Chad Little	Roush Racing	Ford	229	0	handling	52	$17,520
38	30	96	David Green	American Equipment Racing	Chevrolet	187	0	crash	49	$20,000
39	23	77	Robert Pressley	Jasper Motorsports	Ford	120	0	handling	46	$17,500
40	31	81	Kenny Wallace	FILMAR Racing	Ford	32	0	crash	43	$17,500
41	14	26	Johnny Benson Jr.	Roush Racing	Ford	9	0	crash	40	$24,500
42	28	44	Kyle Petty	Petty Enterprises	Pontiac	9	0	crash	37	$24,500
43	40	50	Randy LaJoie	Hendrick Motorsports	Chevrolet	9	0	crash	34	$24,500
Official race results

Previous race: 1998 Coca-Cola 600	NASCAR Winston Cup Series; 1998 season	Next race: 1998 Pontiac Excitement 400
