= 1998 Save Mart/Kragen 350 =

16th race of the 1998 NASCAR Winston Cup Series

Race details
- Race 16 of 33 in the 1998 NASCAR Winston Cup Series
- The 1998 Save Mart/Kragen 350 program cover, featuring Jeff Gordon.
- Date: June 28, 1998
- Official name: 10th Annual Save Mart/Kragen 350
- Location: Sonoma, California, Sears Point Raceway
- Course: Permanent racing facility
- Course length: 1.949 miles (3.137 km)
- Distance: 112 laps, 218.288 mi (351.3 km)
- Average speed: 72.387 miles per hour (116.496 km/h)

Pole position
Driver	Jeff Gordon	Hendrick Motorsports
- Time: 1:11.080

Most laps led
Driver	Jeff Gordon	Hendrick Motorsports
- Laps: 48

Winner
No. 24	Jeff Gordon	Hendrick Motorsports

Television in the United States
- Network: ESPN
- Announcers: Bob Jenkins, Ned Jarrett, Benny Parsons

Radio in the United States
- Radio: Performance Racing Network

The 1998 Save Mart/Kragen 350 was the 16th stock car race of the 1998 NASCAR Winston Cup Series season and the 10th iteration of the event. The race was held on Sunday, June 28, 1998, in Sonoma, California, at the club layout in Sears Point Raceway, a 1.949 miles (3.137 km) permanent road course layout. The race took the scheduled 112 laps to complete. Hendrick Motorsports driver Jeff Gordon would lead a charge from 20th to the lead within the closing laps of the race to take his 33rd career NASCAR Winston Cup Series victory and his fourth of the season. To fill out the podium, Morgan–McClure Motorsports driver Bobby Hamilton and Petty Enterprises driver John Andretti would finish second and third, respectively.

== Background ==
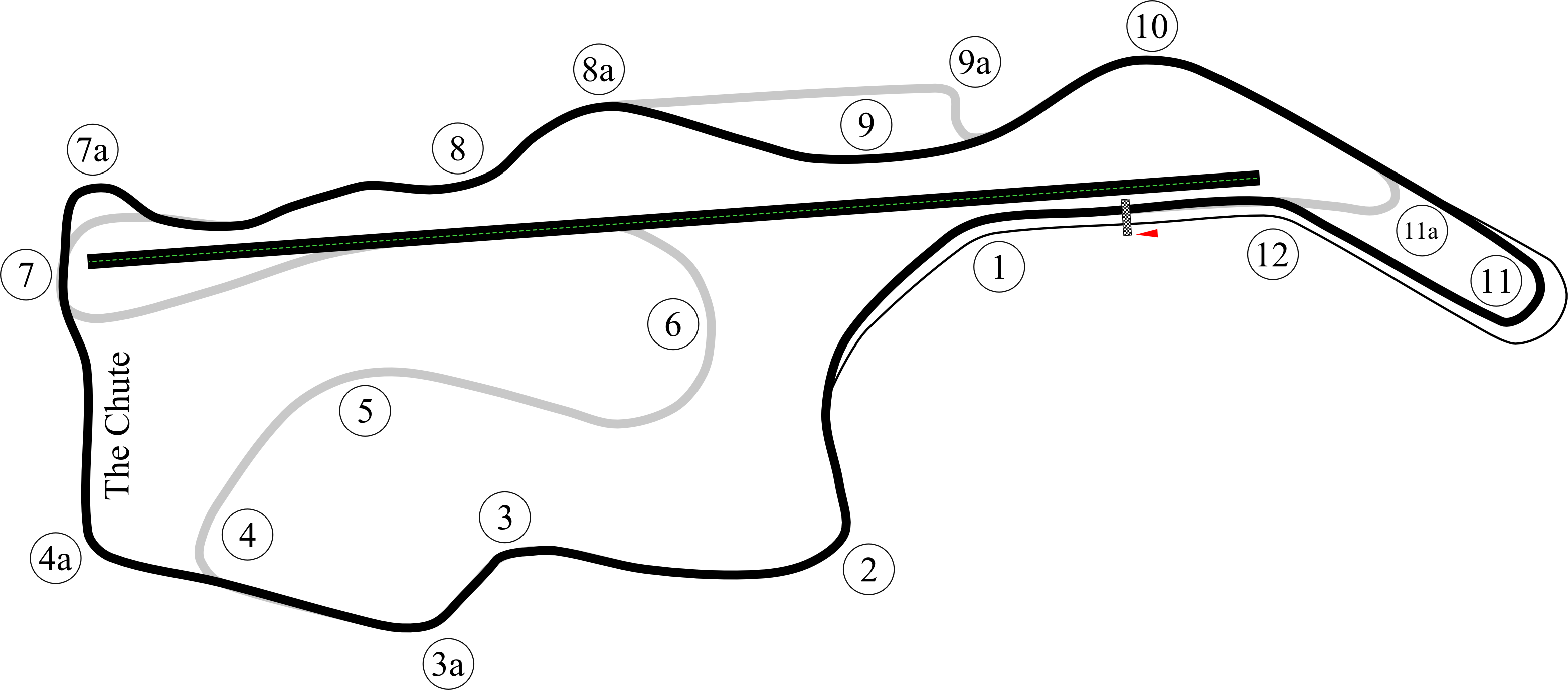
The layout of Sears Point Raceway used by NASCAR at the time.

Sears Point Raceway is an auto racing complex in Sonoma, California. The complex features multiple layouts, including various road course layouts and a drag strip. The facility has hosted various major events since its opening in 1969, including IndyCar, NASCAR, and NHRA events. Sears Point Raceway is owned by Speedway Motorsports.

=== Entry list ===
- (R) denotes rookie driver.

#	Driver	Team	Make
1	Darrell Waltrip	Dale Earnhardt, Inc.	Chevrolet
2	Rusty Wallace	Penske-Kranefuss Racing	Ford
3	Dale Earnhardt	Richard Childress Racing	Chevrolet
4	Bobby Hamilton	Morgan–McClure Motorsports	Chevrolet
5	Terry Labonte	Hendrick Motorsports	Chevrolet
6	Mark Martin	Roush Racing	Ford
7	Geoff Bodine	Mattei Motorsports	Ford
9	Lake Speed (Note: Was replaced by Winston West Series driver Butch Gilliland after Speed injuring his ribs himself in a practice session.)	Melling Racing	Ford
10	Ricky Rudd	Rudd Performance Motorsports	Ford
11	Brett Bodine	Brett Bodine Racing	Ford
12	Jeremy Mayfield	Penske-Kranefuss Racing	Ford
13	Jerry Nadeau (R)	Elliott-Marino Racing	Ford
16	Ted Musgrave	Roush Racing	Ford
17	Ron Hornaday Jr.	Tyler Jet Motorsports	Chevrolet
18	Bobby Labonte	Joe Gibbs Racing	Pontiac
19	Tom Hubert	Roehrig Motorsports	Ford
21	Michael Waltrip	Wood Brothers Racing	Ford
22	Ward Burton	Bill Davis Racing	Pontiac
23	Jimmy Spencer	Haas-Carter Motorsports	Ford
24	Jeff Gordon	Hendrick Motorsports	Chevrolet
26	Johnny Benson Jr.	Roush Racing	Ford
28	Kenny Irwin Jr. (R)	Robert Yates Racing	Ford
30	Derrike Cope	Bahari Racing	Pontiac
31	Mike Skinner	Richard Childress Racing	Chevrolet
33	Ken Schrader	Andy Petree Racing	Chevrolet
35	Todd Bodine	ISM Racing	Pontiac
36	Ernie Irvan	MB2 Motorsports	Pontiac
40	Sterling Marlin	Team SABCO	Chevrolet
41	Steve Grissom	Larry Hedrick Motorsports	Chevrolet
42	Joe Nemechek	Team SABCO	Chevrolet
43	John Andretti	Petty Enterprises	Pontiac
44	Kyle Petty	Petty Enterprises	Pontiac
46	Tommy Kendall	Team SABCO	Chevrolet
50	Wally Dallenbach Jr.	Hendrick Motorsports	Chevrolet
58	Chris Raudman	Raudman Racing	Chevrolet
70	Rick Ware	Ware Racing Enterprises	Ford
71	Dave Marcis	Marcis Auto Racing	Chevrolet
75	Rick Mast	Butch Mock Motorsports	Ford
77	Robert Pressley	Jasper Motorsports	Ford
81	Kenny Wallace	FILMAR Racing	Ford
88	Dale Jarrett	Robert Yates Racing	Ford
90	Dick Trickle	Donlavey Racing	Ford
91	Kevin Lepage (R) (Note: Was released by team owner Joe Falk after qualifying, due to the fact that Lepage had announced his move to the No. 16 car of Roush Racing. Falk felt betrayed by the move, and decided to release him early. Tommy Kendall would replace Lepage.)	LJ Racing	Chevrolet
94	Bill Elliott	Elliott-Marino Racing	Ford
96	Robby Gordon	American Equipment Racing	Chevrolet
97	Chad Little	Roush Racing	Ford
98	Rich Bickle	Cale Yarborough Motorsports	Ford
99	Jeff Burton	Roush Racing	Ford

== Practice ==
=== First practice ===
The first practice session was held on Friday, June 23, at 10:00 AM PST. The session would last for three hours. Jeff Gordon, driving for Hendrick Motorsports, would set the fastest time in the session, with a lap of 1:11.209 and an average speed of 98.532 mph (158.572 km/h).

Pos.	#	Driver	Team	Make	Time	Speed
1	24	Jeff Gordon	Hendrick Motorsports	Chevrolet	1:11.209	98.532
2	46	Tommy Kendall	Team SABCO	Chevrolet	1:11.556	98.055
3	6	Mark Martin	Roush Racing	Ford	1:11.624	97.962
Full first practice results

=== Final practice ===
The final practice session, sometimes referred to as Happy Hour, was held on Saturday, June 24, at 8:00 AM PST. The session would last for one hour and 15 minutes. Jerry Nadeau, driving for Elliott-Marino Racing, would set the fastest time in the session, with a lap of 1:12.230 and an average speed of 97.140 mph (156.332 km/h).

Pos.	#	Driver	Team	Make	Time	Speed
1	13	Jerry Nadeau (R)	Elliott-Marino Racing	Ford	1:12.230	97.140
2	3	Dale Earnhardt	Richard Childress Racing	Chevrolet	1:12.377	96.942
3	88	Dale Jarrett	Robert Yates Racing	Ford	1:12.567	96.689
Full Happy Hour practice results

== Qualifying ==
Qualifying was split into two rounds. The first round was held on Friday, June 19, at 2:00 PM PST. Each driver would have one lap to set a time. During the first round, the top 25 drivers in the round would be guaranteed a starting spot in the race. If a driver was not able to guarantee a spot in the first round, they had the option to scrub their time from the first round and try and run a faster lap time in a second round qualifying run, held on Saturday, June 20, at 10:00 AM PST. As with the first round, each driver would have one lap to set a time. On January 24, 1998, NASCAR would announce that the amount of provisionals given would be increased from last season. Positions 26-36 would be decided on time, while positions 37-43 would be based on provisionals. Six spots are awarded by the use of provisionals based on owner's points. The seventh is awarded to a past champion who has not otherwise qualified for the race. If no past champion needs the provisional, the next team in the owner points will be awarded a provisional.

Jeff Gordon, driving for Hendrick Motorsports, would win the pole, setting a time of 1:11.080 and an average speed of 98.711 miles per hour (158.860 km/h).

Six drivers would fail to qualify: Tommy Kendall, Dave Marcis, Todd Bodine, Rick Ware, and Chris Raudman.

=== Full qualifying results ===
Pos.	#	Driver	Team	Make	Time	Speed
1	24	Jeff Gordon	Hendrick Motorsports	Chevrolet	1:11.080	98.711
2	13	Jerry Nadeau (R)	Elliott-Marino Racing	Ford	1:11.228	98.506
3	88	Dale Jarrett	Robert Yates Racing	Ford	1:11.395	98.276
4	7	Geoff Bodine	Mattei Motorsports	Ford	1:11.540	98.077
5	12	Jeremy Mayfield	Penske-Kranefuss Racing	Ford	1:11.613	97.977
6	4	Bobby Hamilton	Morgan–McClure Motorsports	Chevrolet	1:11.616	97.973
7	75	Rick Mast	Butch Mock Motorsports	Ford	1:11.664	97.907
8	44	Kyle Petty	Petty Enterprises	Pontiac	1:11.665	97.906
9	18	Bobby Labonte	Joe Gibbs Racing	Pontiac	1:11.676	97.891
10	19	Tom Hubert	Roehrig Motorsports	Ford	1:11.695	97.865
11	21	Michael Waltrip	Wood Brothers Racing	Ford	1:11.822	97.692
12	28	Kenny Irwin Jr. (R)	Robert Yates Racing	Ford	1:11.843	97.663
13	1	Darrell Waltrip	Dale Earnhardt, Inc.	Chevrolet	1:11.882	97.610
14	42	Joe Nemechek	Team SABCO	Chevrolet	1:11.949	97.519
15	10	Ricky Rudd	Rudd Performance Motorsports	Ford	1:11.972	97.488
16	40	Sterling Marlin	Team SABCO	Chevrolet	1:12.000	97.450
17	3	Dale Earnhardt	Richard Childress Racing	Chevrolet	1:12.006	97.442
18	96	Robby Gordon	American Equipment Racing	Chevrolet	1:12.036	97.401
19	26	Johnny Benson Jr.	Roush Racing	Ford	1:12.037	97.400
20	16	Ted Musgrave	Roush Racing	Ford	1:12.066	97.361
21	43	John Andretti	Petty Enterprises	Pontiac	1:12.100	97.315
22	81	Kenny Wallace	FILMAR Racing	Ford	1:12.232	97.137
23	99	Jeff Burton	Roush Racing	Ford	1:12.243	97.122
24	31	Mike Skinner	Richard Childress Racing	Chevrolet	1:12.258	97.102
25	22	Ward Burton	Bill Davis Racing	Pontiac	1:12.287	97.063
26	6	Mark Martin	Roush Racing	Ford	1:11.489	98.147
27	33	Ken Schrader	Andy Petree Racing	Chevrolet	1:11.941	97.530
28	2	Rusty Wallace	Penske-Kranefuss Racing	Ford	1:11.943	97.527
29	5	Terry Labonte	Hendrick Motorsports	Chevrolet	1:12.122	97.285
30	11	Brett Bodine	Brett Bodine Racing	Ford	1:12.126	97.280
31	98	Rich Bickle	Cale Yarborough Motorsports	Ford	1:12.174	97.215
32	36	Ernie Irvan	MB2 Motorsports	Pontiac	1:12.309	97.034
33	17	Ron Hornaday Jr.	Tyler Jet Motorsports	Chevrolet	1:12.487	96.795
34	23	Jimmy Spencer	Travis Carter Enterprises	Ford	1:12.638	96.594
35	97	Chad Little	Roush Racing	Ford	1:12.727	96.476
36	77	Robert Pressley	Jasper Motorsports	Ford	1:12.785	96.399
Provisionals
37	50	Wally Dallenbach Jr.	Hendrick Motorsports	Chevrolet	-*	-*
38	90	Dick Trickle	Donlavey Racing	Ford	-*	-*
39	41	Steve Grissom	Larry Hedrick Motorsports	Chevrolet	-*	-*
40	9	Butch Gilliland	Melling Racing	Ford	-*	-*
41	30	Derrike Cope	Bahari Racing	Pontiac	-*	-*
42	91	Kevin Lepage (Note: Was released by team owner Joe Falk after qualifying, due to the fact that Lepage had announced his move to the No. 16 car of Roush Racing. Falk felt betrayed by the move, and decided to release him early. Tommy Kendall would replace Lepage.)	LJ Racing	Chevrolet	-*	-*
Champion's Provisional
43	94	Bill Elliott	Elliott-Marino Racing	Ford	-*	-*
Failed to qualify
44	46	Tommy Kendall	Team SABCO	Chevrolet	1:13.044	96.057
45	71	Dave Marcis	Marcis Auto Racing	Chevrolet	1:13.718	95.179
46	35	Todd Bodine	ISM Racing	Pontiac	1:13.950	94.880
47	70	Rick Ware	Ware Racing Enterprises	Ford	1:16.320	91.934
48	58	Chris Raudman	Raudman Racing	Chevrolet	-	-
Official qualifying results

*Time not available.

== Race results ==
Fin	St	#	Driver	Team	Make	Laps	Led	Status	Pts	Winnings
1	1	24	Jeff Gordon	Hendrick Motorsports	Chevrolet	112	48	running	185	$160,675
2	6	4	Bobby Hamilton	Morgan–McClure Motorsports	Chevrolet	112	17	running	175	$81,575
3	21	43	John Andretti	Petty Enterprises	Pontiac	112	0	running	165	$62,150
4	9	18	Bobby Labonte	Joe Gibbs Racing	Pontiac	112	0	running	160	$59,340
5	28	2	Rusty Wallace	Penske-Kranefuss Racing	Ford	112	0	running	155	$49,715
6	26	6	Mark Martin	Roush Racing	Ford	112	0	running	150	$54,615
7	16	40	Sterling Marlin	Team SABCO	Chevrolet	112	14	running	151	$49,615
8	7	75	Rick Mast	Butch Mock Motorsports	Ford	112	0	running	142	$40,115
9	12	28	Kenny Irwin Jr. (R)	Robert Yates Racing	Ford	112	0	running	138	$47,365
10	39	41	Steve Grissom	Larry Hedrick Motorsports	Chevrolet	112	8	running	139	$46,510
11	17	3	Dale Earnhardt	Richard Childress Racing	Chevrolet	112	0	running	130	$44,950
12	43	94	Bill Elliott	Elliott-Marino Racing	Ford	112	0	running	127	$39,550
13	13	1	Darrell Waltrip	Dale Earnhardt, Inc.	Chevrolet	112	3	running	129	$32,200
14	33	17	Ron Hornaday Jr.	Tyler Jet Motorsports	Chevrolet	112	0	running	121	$27,850
15	3	88	Dale Jarrett	Robert Yates Racing	Ford	112	5	running	123	$46,700
16	42	91	Tommy Kendall (Note: Was released by team owner Joe Falk after qualifying, due to the fact that Lepage had announced his move to the No. 16 car of Roush Racing. Falk felt betrayed by the move, and decided to release him early. Tommy Kendall would replace Lepage.)	LJ Racing	Chevrolet	112	2	running	120	$33,800
17	24	31	Mike Skinner	Richard Childress Racing	Chevrolet	112	0	running	112	$30,175
18	5	12	Jeremy Mayfield	Penske-Kranefuss Racing	Ford	112	0	running	109	$36,950
19	20	16	Ted Musgrave	Roush Racing	Ford	112	0	running	106	$36,495
20	27	33	Ken Schrader	Andy Petree Racing	Chevrolet	112	0	running	103	$35,160
21	19	26	Johnny Benson Jr.	Roush Racing	Ford	112	0	running	100	$36,540
22	22	81	Kenny Wallace	FILMAR Racing	Ford	112	0	running	97	$28,940
23	35	97	Chad Little	Roush Racing	Ford	112	0	running	94	$28,805
24	40	9	Butch Gilliland	Melling Racing	Ford	112	0	running	91	$28,625
25	14	42	Joe Nemechek	Team SABCO	Chevrolet	112	0	running	88	$35,505
26	8	44	Kyle Petty	Petty Enterprises	Pontiac	112	0	running	85	$35,375
27	37	50	Wally Dallenbach Jr.	Hendrick Motorsports	Chevrolet	112	0	running	82	$35,240
28	15	10	Ricky Rudd	Rudd Performance Motorsports	Ford	112	14	running	84	$41,455
29	34	23	Jimmy Spencer	Travis Carter Enterprises	Ford	112	0	running	76	$35,035
30	36	77	Robert Pressley	Jasper Motorsports	Ford	111	0	running	73	$27,995
31	31	98	Rich Bickle	Cale Yarborough Motorsports	Ford	110	0	running	70	$31,925
32	30	11	Brett Bodine	Brett Bodine Racing	Ford	110	0	running	67	$34,365
33	38	90	Dick Trickle	Donlavey Racing	Ford	109	0	running	64	$31,845
34	11	21	Michael Waltrip	Wood Brothers Racing	Ford	107	0	running	61	$31,825
35	4	7	Geoff Bodine	Mattei Motorsports	Ford	103	0	transmission	58	$32,105
36	32	36	Ernie Irvan	MB2 Motorsports	Pontiac	103	0	running	55	$31,785
37	18	96	Robby Gordon	American Equipment Racing	Chevrolet	102	1	suspension	57	$24,765
38	41	30	Derrike Cope	Bahari Racing	Pontiac	92	0	rear end	49	$31,745
39	23	99	Jeff Burton	Roush Racing	Ford	87	0	handling	46	$41,325
40	25	22	Ward Burton	Bill Davis Racing	Pontiac	84	0	transmission	43	$31,705
41	10	19	Tom Hubert	Roehrig Motorsports	Ford	78	0	transmission	40	$24,685
42	29	5	Terry Labonte	Hendrick Motorsports	Chevrolet	46	0	crash	37	$40,665
43	2	13	Jerry Nadeau (R)	Elliott-Marino Racing	Ford	13	0	crash	34	$25,640
Official race results

=== Notes ===
Previous race: 1998 Pocono 500	NASCAR Winston Cup Series; 1998 season	Next race: 1998 Jiffy Lube 300
