= TNN Outdoors Bass Tournament '96 =

1996 video game

- North American box art
- Developer: Imagitec Design
- Publisher: American Softworks
- Series: TNN Bass Fishing
- Platform: Sega Genesis
- Release: NA: 1996
- Genre: Fishing
- Modes: Single-player; Co-operative multiplayer

TNN Outdoors Bass Tournament '96 is a sequel to the fishing video game TNN Bass Tournament of Champions. It was released exclusively in North America in 1996.

== Summary ==
Players must use the correct lure in order to catch the heavyweight bass. Employing a scientific approach towards fishing can be useful in situations like these.

While the graphics were slightly enhanced, the goal of the game is primarily the same. Rural and suburban teenage boys were primarily the target audience of this electronic video game. Famous settings used in this game include Lake Erie, Lake Huron, and Lake Superior. Other things added to this game are temperature, time, wind speed, and weather.

All the fishing that is done on Lake Erie is done entirely on the western part of the lake in the Michigan/Ohio area. Everything can affect the player's performance; including the weather, the season, the time of day and even the strength of the wind. All games start at 7:30 AM local time and end at sunset when all boats must dock in for the weigh-in ceremonies.
