= 1998 Pocono 500 =

15th race of the 1998 NASCAR Winston Cup Series

Race details
- Race 15 of 33 in the 1998 NASCAR Winston Cup Series
- The 1998 Pocono 500 program cover, featuring Richard Petty.
- Date: June 21, 1998
- Official name: 17th Annual Pocono 500
- Location: Long Pond, Pennsylvania, Pocono Raceway
- Course: Permanent racing facility
- Course length: 2.5 miles (4.0 km)
- Distance: 200 laps, 500 mi (804.672 km)
- Average speed: 134.389 miles per hour (216.278 km/h)

Pole position
Driver	Jeff Gordon	Hendrick Motorsports
- Time: 53.558

Most laps led
Driver	Jeremy Mayfield	Penske-Kranefuss Racing
- Laps: 122

Winner
No. 12	Jeremy Mayfield	Penske-Kranefuss Racing

Television in the United States
- Network: TNN
- Announcers: Eli Gold, Buddy Baker, Dick Berggren

Radio in the United States
- Radio: Motor Racing Network

The 1998 Pocono 500 was the 15th stock car race of the 1998 NASCAR Winston Cup Series season and the 17th iteration of the event. The race was held on Sunday, June 21, 1998, in Long Pond, Pennsylvania, at Pocono Raceway, a 2.5 miles (4.0 km) triangular permanent course. The race took the scheduled 200 laps to complete. Within the last 25 laps, Penske-Kranefuss Racing driver Jeremy Mayfield was able to defend against Hendrick Motorsports driver Jeff Gordon to complete a dominant run to win the race, securing his first career NASCAR Winston Cup Series victory and his only victory of the season. To fill out the podium, Gordon and Robert Yates Racing driver Dale Jarrett would finish second and third, respectively.

== Background ==
The layout of Pocono Raceway, the venue where the race was held.

The race was held at Pocono Raceway, which is a three-turn superspeedway located in Long Pond, Pennsylvania. Pocono Raceway is one of a very few NASCAR tracks not owned by either Speedway Motorsports or NASCAR. It is operated by the Igdalsky siblings Brandon, Nicholas, and sister Ashley, and cousins Joseph IV and Chase Mattioli, all of whom are third-generation members of the family-owned Mattco Inc, started by Joseph II and Rose Mattioli.

=== Entry list ===
- (R) denotes rookie driver.

#	Driver	Team	Make
00	Buckshot Jones	Buckshot Racing	Pontiac
1	Darrell Waltrip	Dale Earnhardt, Inc.	Chevrolet
2	Rusty Wallace	Penske-Kranefuss Racing	Ford
3	Dale Earnhardt	Richard Childress Racing	Chevrolet
4	Bobby Hamilton	Morgan–McClure Motorsports	Chevrolet
5	Terry Labonte	Hendrick Motorsports	Chevrolet
6	Mark Martin	Roush Racing	Ford
7	Geoff Bodine	Mattei Motorsports	Ford
9	Lake Speed	Melling Racing	Ford
10	Ricky Rudd	Rudd Performance Motorsports	Ford
11	Brett Bodine	Brett Bodine Racing	Ford
12	Jeremy Mayfield	Penske-Kranefuss Racing	Ford
13	Jerry Nadeau (R)	Elliott-Marino Racing	Ford
16	Ted Musgrave	Roush Racing	Ford
18	Bobby Labonte	Joe Gibbs Racing	Pontiac
21	Michael Waltrip	Wood Brothers Racing	Ford
22	Ward Burton	Bill Davis Racing	Pontiac
23	Jimmy Spencer	Haas-Carter Motorsports	Ford
24	Jeff Gordon	Hendrick Motorsports	Chevrolet
26	Johnny Benson Jr.	Roush Racing	Ford
28	Kenny Irwin Jr. (R)	Robert Yates Racing	Ford
30	Derrike Cope	Bahari Racing	Pontiac
31	Mike Skinner	Richard Childress Racing	Chevrolet
33	Ken Schrader	Andy Petree Racing	Chevrolet
35	Todd Bodine	ISM Racing	Pontiac
36	Ernie Irvan	MB2 Motorsports	Pontiac
40	Sterling Marlin	Team SABCO	Chevrolet
41	Steve Grissom	Larry Hedrick Motorsports	Chevrolet
42	Joe Nemechek	Team SABCO	Chevrolet
43	John Andretti	Petty Enterprises	Pontiac
44	Kyle Petty	Petty Enterprises	Pontiac
46	Jeff Green	Team SABCO	Chevrolet
50	Wally Dallenbach Jr.	Hendrick Motorsports	Chevrolet
71	Dave Marcis	Marcis Auto Racing	Chevrolet
75	Rick Mast	Butch Mock Motorsports	Ford
77	Robert Pressley	Jasper Motorsports	Ford
81	Kenny Wallace	FILMAR Racing	Ford
88	Dale Jarrett	Robert Yates Racing	Ford
90	Dick Trickle	Donlavey Racing	Ford
91	Kevin Lepage (R)	LJ Racing	Chevrolet
94	Bill Elliott	Elliott-Marino Racing	Ford
96	Hut Stricklin	American Equipment Racing	Chevrolet
97	Chad Little	Roush Racing	Ford
98	Rich Bickle	Cale Yarborough Motorsports	Ford
99	Jeff Burton	Roush Racing	Ford

== Practice ==
=== First practice ===
The first practice session was held on Friday, June 19. Jeremy Mayfield, driving for Penske-Kranefuss Racing, would set the fastest time in the session, with a lap of 53.639 and an average speed of 167.788 mph (270.029 km/h).

Pos.	#	Driver	Team	Make	Time	Speed
1	12	Jeremy Mayfield	Penske-Kranefuss Racing	Ford	53.639	167.788
2	88	Dale Jarrett	Robert Yates Racing	Ford	53.771	167.376
3	42	Joe Nemechek	Team SABCO	Chevrolet	53.773	167.370
Full first practice results

=== Final practice ===
The final practice session, sometimes referred to as Happy Hour, was held on Saturday, June 20. Jeremy Mayfield, driving for Penske-Kranefuss Racing, would set the fastest time in the session, with a lap of 54.681 and an average speed of 164.591 mph (264.884 km/h).

Pos.	#	Driver	Team	Make	Time	Speed
1	12	Jeremy Mayfield	Penske-Kranefuss Racing	Ford	54.681	164.591
2	2	Rusty Wallace	Penske-Kranefuss Racing	Ford	54.803	164.225
3	24	Jeff Gordon	Hendrick Motorsports	Chevrolet	54.816	164.186
Full Happy Hour practice results

== Qualifying ==
Qualifying was split into two rounds. The first round was held on Friday, June 19, at 3:00 PM EST. Each driver would have one lap to set a time. During the first round, the top 25 drivers in the round would be guaranteed a starting spot in the race. If a driver was not able to guarantee a spot in the first round, they had the option to scrub their time from the first round and try and run a faster lap time in a second round qualifying run, held on Saturday, June 20, at 11:30 AM EST. As with the first round, each driver would have one lap to set a time. On January 24, 1998, NASCAR would announce that the amount of provisionals given would be increased from last season. Positions 26-36 would be decided on time, while positions 37-43 would be based on provisionals. Six spots are awarded by the use of provisionals based on owner's points. The seventh is awarded to a past champion who has not otherwise qualified for the race. If no past champion needs the provisional, the next team in the owner points will be awarded a provisional. Jeff Gordon, driving for Hendrick Motorsports, would win the pole, setting a time of 53.558 and an average speed of 168.042 miles per hour (270.437 km/h).

Two drivers would fail to qualify: Dave Marcis and Buckshot Jones.

=== Full qualifying results ===
Pos.	#	Driver	Team	Make	Time	Speed
1	24	Jeff Gordon	Hendrick Motorsports	Chevrolet	53.558	168.042
2	2	Rusty Wallace	Penske-Kranefuss Racing	Ford	53.752	167.436
3	12	Jeremy Mayfield	Penske-Kranefuss Racing	Ford	53.832	167.187
4	33	Ken Schrader	Andy Petree Racing	Chevrolet	53.944	166.840
5	22	Ward Burton	Bill Davis Racing	Pontiac	53.950	166.821
6	6	Mark Martin	Roush Racing	Ford	53.959	166.793
7	42	Joe Nemechek	Team SABCO	Chevrolet	53.972	166.753
8	16	Ted Musgrave	Roush Racing	Ford	54.052	166.506
9	88	Dale Jarrett	Robert Yates Racing	Ford	54.058	166.488
10	97	Chad Little	Roush Racing	Ford	54.079	166.423
11	3	Dale Earnhardt	Richard Childress Racing	Chevrolet	54.089	166.392
12	5	Terry Labonte	Hendrick Motorsports	Chevrolet	54.106	166.340
13	81	Kenny Wallace	FILMAR Racing	Ford	54.136	166.248
14	50	Wally Dallenbach Jr.	Hendrick Motorsports	Chevrolet	54.145	166.220
15	40	Sterling Marlin	Team SABCO	Chevrolet	54.252	165.893
16	4	Bobby Hamilton	Morgan–McClure Motorsports	Chevrolet	54.254	165.886
17	44	Kyle Petty	Petty Enterprises	Pontiac	54.263	165.859
18	1	Darrell Waltrip	Dale Earnhardt, Inc.	Chevrolet	54.277	165.816
19	43	John Andretti	Petty Enterprises	Pontiac	54.293	165.767
20	31	Mike Skinner	Richard Childress Racing	Chevrolet	54.326	165.667
21	90	Dick Trickle	Donlavey Racing	Ford	54.339	165.627
22	94	Bill Elliott	Elliott-Marino Racing	Ford	54.344	165.612
23	18	Bobby Labonte	Joe Gibbs Racing	Pontiac	54.383	165.493
24	75	Rick Mast	Butch Mock Motorsports	Ford	54.398	165.447
25	96	Hut Stricklin	American Equipment Racing	Chevrolet	54.405	165.426
26	46	Jeff Green	Team SABCO	Chevrolet	54.066	166.463
27	98	Rich Bickle	Cale Yarborough Motorsports	Ford	54.169	166.147
28	99	Jeff Burton	Roush Racing	Ford	54.267	165.847
29	21	Michael Waltrip	Wood Brothers Racing	Ford	54.287	165.786
30	13	Jerry Nadeau (R)	Elliott-Marino Racing	Ford	54.309	165.718
31	36	Ernie Irvan	MB2 Motorsports	Pontiac	54.331	165.651
32	77	Robert Pressley	Jasper Motorsports	Ford	54.429	165.353
33	10	Ricky Rudd	Rudd Performance Motorsports	Ford	54.485	165.183
34	23	Jimmy Spencer	Travis Carter Enterprises	Ford	54.618	164.780
35	11	Brett Bodine	Brett Bodine Racing	Ford	54.595	164.850
36	28	Kenny Irwin Jr. (R)	Robert Yates Racing	Ford	54.612	164.799
Provisionals
37	26	Johnny Benson Jr.	Roush Racing	Ford	-*	-*
38	41	Steve Grissom	Larry Hedrick Motorsports	Chevrolet	-*	-*
39	7	Geoff Bodine	Mattei Motorsports	Ford	-*	-*
40	9	Lake Speed	Melling Racing	Ford	-*	-*
41	30	Derrike Cope	Bahari Racing	Pontiac	-*	-*
42	91	Kevin Lepage (R)	LJ Racing	Chevrolet	-*	-*
43	35	Todd Bodine	ISM Racing	Pontiac	-*	-*
Failed to qualify
44	71	Dave Marcis	Marcis Auto Racing	Chevrolet	54.634	164.733
45	00	Buckshot Jones	Buckshot Racing	Pontiac	54.995	163.651
Official qualifying results

== Race results ==
Fin	St	#	Driver	Team	Make	Laps	Led	Status	Pts	Winnings
1	3	12	Jeremy Mayfield	Penske-Kranefuss Racing	Ford	200	122	running	185	$111,580
2	1	24	Jeff Gordon	Hendrick Motorsports	Chevrolet	200	17	running	175	$79,500
3	9	88	Dale Jarrett	Robert Yates Racing	Ford	200	26	running	170	$62,220
4	28	99	Jeff Burton	Roush Racing	Ford	200	1	running	165	$49,080
5	6	6	Mark Martin	Roush Racing	Ford	200	3	running	160	$40,645
6	18	1	Darrell Waltrip	Dale Earnhardt, Inc.	Chevrolet	200	10	running	155	$28,725
7	14	50	Wally Dallenbach Jr.	Hendrick Motorsports	Chevrolet	200	9	running	151	$34,575
8	11	3	Dale Earnhardt	Richard Childress Racing	Chevrolet	200	1	running	147	$34,625
9	15	40	Sterling Marlin	Team SABCO	Chevrolet	200	0	running	138	$23,825
10	34	23	Jimmy Spencer	Travis Carter Enterprises	Ford	200	0	running	134	$41,975
11	36	28	Kenny Irwin Jr. (R)	Robert Yates Racing	Ford	200	0	running	130	$33,175
12	12	5	Terry Labonte	Hendrick Motorsports	Chevrolet	200	0	running	127	$32,025
13	19	43	John Andretti	Petty Enterprises	Pontiac	200	0	running	124	$31,425
14	29	21	Michael Waltrip	Wood Brothers Racing	Ford	200	0	running	121	$27,575
15	23	18	Bobby Labonte	Joe Gibbs Racing	Pontiac	200	8	running	123	$31,675
16	32	77	Robert Pressley	Jasper Motorsports	Ford	200	1	running	120	$20,275
17	8	16	Ted Musgrave	Roush Racing	Ford	200	0	running	112	$25,825
18	35	11	Brett Bodine	Brett Bodine Racing	Ford	200	1	running	114	$25,525
19	42	91	Kevin Lepage (R)	LJ Racing	Chevrolet	200	0	running	106	$18,925
20	16	4	Bobby Hamilton	Morgan–McClure Motorsports	Chevrolet	200	0	running	103	$32,400
21	30	13	Jerry Nadeau (R)	Elliott-Marino Racing	Ford	200	0	running	100	$17,755
22	43	35	Todd Bodine	ISM Racing	Pontiac	199	0	running	97	$14,355
23	38	41	Steve Grissom	Larry Hedrick Motorsports	Chevrolet	199	0	running	94	$24,430
24	5	22	Ward Burton	Bill Davis Racing	Pontiac	198	0	running	91	$24,280
25	40	9	Lake Speed	Melling Racing	Ford	198	0	running	88	$17,105
26	41	30	Derrike Cope	Bahari Racing	Pontiac	194	0	running	85	$23,955
27	21	90	Dick Trickle	Donlavey Racing	Ford	192	0	transmission	82	$23,805
28	25	96	Hut Stricklin	American Equipment Racing	Chevrolet	184	0	engine	79	$16,655
29	20	31	Mike Skinner	Richard Childress Racing	Chevrolet	180	0	running	76	$16,580
30	10	97	Chad Little	Roush Racing	Ford	173	1	crash	78	$16,030
31	17	44	Kyle Petty	Petty Enterprises	Pontiac	163	0	engine	70	$20,480
32	27	98	Rich Bickle	Cale Yarborough Motorsports	Ford	161	0	transmission	67	$20,430
33	26	46	Jeff Green	Team SABCO	Chevrolet	157	0	transmission	64	$13,830
34	31	36	Ernie Irvan	MB2 Motorsports	Pontiac	148	0	running	61	$20,255
35	7	42	Joe Nemechek	Team SABCO	Chevrolet	147	0	transmission	58	$20,180
36	37	26	Johnny Benson Jr.	Roush Racing	Ford	142	0	running	55	$20,105
37	22	94	Bill Elliott	Elliott-Marino Racing	Ford	130	0	engine	52	$20,040
38	24	75	Rick Mast	Butch Mock Motorsports	Ford	86	0	engine	49	$12,915
39	13	81	Kenny Wallace	FILMAR Racing	Ford	85	0	engine	46	$12,915
40	39	7	Geoff Bodine	Mattei Motorsports	Ford	76	0	engine	43	$19,915
41	33	10	Ricky Rudd	Rudd Performance Motorsports	Ford	49	0	engine	40	$29,315
42	2	2	Rusty Wallace	Penske-Kranefuss Racing	Ford	13	0	engine	37	$27,915
43	4	33	Ken Schrader	Andy Petree Racing	Chevrolet	5	0	crash	34	$22,415
Official race results

Previous race: 1998 Miller Lite 400	NASCAR Winston Cup Series; 1998 season	Next race: 1998 Save Mart/Kragen 350
