= Starsky & Hutch =

American action television series (1975–1979)

- Genre: Action; Crime thriller; Mystery
- Created by: William Blinn
- Starring: David Soul; Paul Michael Glaser; Antonio Fargas; Bernie Hamilton
- Theme music composer: Lalo Schifrin (S1); Tom Scott (S2, S4); Mark Snow (S3)
- Composers: J. J. Johnson (S1); Andy Kulberg (S4)
- Country of origin: United States
- Original language: English
- No. of seasons: 4
- No. of episodes: 93 (list of episodes)

Production
- Executive producers: Aaron Spelling; Leonard Goldberg
- Producer: Joseph T. Naar
- Cinematography: Travers Hill (S1–2); Keith C. Smith (S3); Eduardo J. Ricci (S4)
- Editors: George W. Brooks (S1–3); Howard Kunin (S4)
- Running time: 45–48 minutes
- Production companies: Spelling-Goldberg Productions; Columbia Pictures Television (1977–1979)

Original release
- Network: ABC
- Release: April 30, 1975 – May 15, 1979

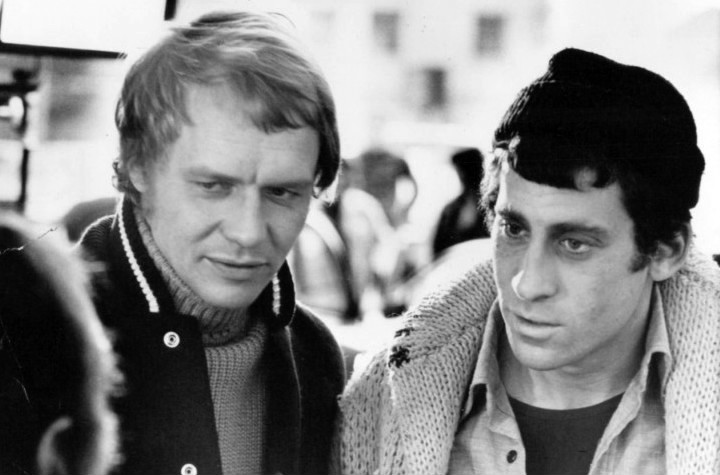
Soul and Glaser in 1975

Starsky & Hutch is an American action television series, which consisted of a 72-minute pilot movie (originally aired as a Movie of the Week entry) and 92 episodes of 50 minutes each. The show was created by William Blinn (inspired by the success of the then recent movie Busting), produced by Spelling-Goldberg Productions and starred Paul Michael Glaser and David Soul in the title roles, Starsky and Hutch. It was broadcast from April 1975 (pilot movie) to August 1979 on the ABC network.

Starsky & Hutch was distributed by Columbia Pictures Television in the United States. Sony Pictures Television is now the worldwide distributor for the series. The series later inspired a video game and a feature film.

== Cast ==
The series' protagonists were two Southern California police detectives: Sergeant David Michael Starsky (Paul Michael Glaser) and Sergeant Kenneth Richard "Hutch" Hutchinson (David Soul). Starsky is a dark-haired, Brooklyn transplant and U.S. Army veteran, with a street-wise manner and intense, sometimes childlike moodiness. Hutch is the divorced, blond, Duluth, Minnesota native with a more reserved and intellectual approach. Under the radio call sign "Zebra Three", they were known for usually tearing around the streets of fictional Bay City, California. Much of the series was shot on location in the Los Angeles beach community of San Pedro. The building that was used as the Metropolitan Division police headquarters in the first season is now the City of Los Angeles' San Pedro Neighborhood City Hall.

=== Supporting characters ===
The detectives' main confidential informant was the street-wise, ethically ambiguous, "jive-talking" Huggy Bear (Antonio Fargas), who often dressed in a flashy manner and operated his own bar (first named "Huggy Bear's", and later, "The Pits"). The duo's boss was the gruff, no-nonsense-but-fair Captain Harold C. Dobey (Bernie Hamilton in the series, and gravel-voiced Richard Ward in the pilot). Series creator William Blinn first used the name Huggy Bear on-screen for a character, also a confidential informant, in an episode penned by Blinn for the TV series The Rookies during the 1973 second season, "Prayers Unanswered Prayers Unheard", there, played by actor Johnny Brown.

== Seasons ==
=== Seasons 1–2 ===
In contrast to police characters on American TV in prior years, Starsky and Hutch were open with physical gestures of friendly/brotherly affection toward one another, often declaring that they trusted only each other (in an "us against the world"–type sense). While likely "normal" by American social standards since the 1990s, such body language conflicted with 1970s norms of (emotionally restrained) masculinity. In a show documentary tape made during the show's run that can be found on YouTube, the narrator intones that some Hollywood industry types referred to the characters as "French kissing prime-time homos". Soul verified this statement in a 1999 cast reunion interview in the United Kingdom.

Many fans were attracted not just by the characters, but the quality of writing during the first two seasons (despite the fact that the majority of first-season stories were actually existing scripts that were merely adapted to fit the series). The second-season episode "Long Walk Down a Short Dirt Road", featured country star Lynn Anderson as a singer being stalked by a deranged person, played by Joshua Bryant; it was based upon a real-life incident involving country music legend Dolly Parton. The part was written with Parton in mind, but Anderson wound up playing the role.

Season 1: Starsky & Hutch aired on Wednesday nights at 10 p.m. and aired against Kate McShane on CBS and the second season law drama Petrocelli on NBC. Starsky & Hutch had no trouble beating its competition and finished #16 with a 22.5 share in the A.C. Nielsen Ratings.

Season 2: Starsky & Hutch was moved to Saturday night for the second season and was up against tough competition on CBS with The Mary Tyler Moore Show followed by The Bob Newhart Show. NBC had NBC Saturday Night at the Movies. Although the show lost some of their viewers from the move from the Wednesday night time slot from the previous season, Starsky & Hutch held its own, finishing #34 with a 19.6 rating in the Nielsens.

=== Season 3 ===
In 1977, a rising concern in America about violence on TV, along with Glaser's own concerns about the level of violence in the series, forced the writers to reduce the violent "action" scenes, with more romantically and socially themed storylines, and play-up the "buddy-buddy" aspect of the show's leads even more. At the same time, the lead actors—Glaser in particular—became jaded with the general theme; these and other factors contributed to the fading popularity of the series.

Glaser indicated several times that he wanted to get out of his contract and quit the series; he even sued the producers to force a release from his contract before the start of the third season. It seemed that he would not be returning for filming, so to fill the presumed void, the character "Officer Linda Baylor" (played by Roz Kelly) was created, and a number of alternative scripts featuring her instead of Starsky were written (whether the show's name would have remained the same is unknown). After being granted more creative control over scripts, opportunities to direct episodes, and a per-episode pay raise (to $35,000, up from $5,000), Glaser returned to the show. Ultimately, Officer Baylor only appeared in one episode the episode "Fatal Charm".

Despite this major change in the tone of the show, with a lot of the violence reduced and more of a focus on the friendship of the two leads, viewership remained steady during the season. From September to December 1977, the show stayed in its Saturday-night time slot, now up against The Jeffersons and The Tony Randall Show on CBS and NBC Saturday Night at the Movies. It was the first lead-in to The Love Boat and after its immediate success, The Love Boat was moved up an hour in January 1978 into the 9:00 slot. Having been displaced on Saturday nights, Starsky & Hutch moved back to its original Wednesday-night time slot of 10 p.m. The ratings dropped a little bit, but Starsky & Hutch finished #33 (tied with ABC's Lucan) with a 19.2 Nielsen rating.

=== Season 4 ===
Glaser again voiced his desires to leave during the fourth and final season. This time, Starsky's wayward younger brother Nick (John Herzfeld) was introduced, in the episode "Starsky's Brother". It was intended that if Glaser was to quit, that the reformed Nick would take David's place on the police force (and allow the series to avoid a title change). Ultimately, the disgruntled Glaser decided to return, yet again, to finish out the season. Although a fifth season was planned, increasing production costs, Glaser's persistent (and oft-publicized) desire to move on, and declining ratings, brought an end to the series.

The final episode, "Sweet Revenge" (which has Starsky fighting for his life after being gunned down), originally had its co-lead dying in the early drafts. The producers decided to have the character survive, as it was felt that a dead Starsky would disrupt the continuity of reruns/syndication, and preclude the option of the producers' reviving the series in the near future. Starsky & Hutch finished #36 in the Nielsen Ratings in its final season. Network reruns continued on ABC on Tuesday nights until August 21, 1979.

=== Syndication ===
After its prime-time run, Starsky & Hutch was sold into syndication, and has been shown on several local channels and cable networks (e.g., The National Network, and WWME-CA, also known as MeTV, in Chicago). The series made its cable debut on TNT in 1994 and later appeared on TV Land beginning in 2000. In 2015–2016, the series aired on cable's El Rey Network on weekday mornings. Several episodes from the first two seasons can be viewed for free in Minisode and in regular format on Crackle. The show has also been broadcast on Cozi TV, getTV and tubi.

== Home media ==
Sony Pictures Home Entertainment has released 4 Seasons on DVD in Regions 1 and 2 between 2004 and 2006.

Mill Creek Entertainment acquired the rights to various television series from the Sony Pictures library including Starsky & Hutch in 2013. They re-released the first season on DVD on March 4, 2014.

Mill Creek released Starsky & Hutch - The Complete Series on DVD in Region 1 on November 11, 2014.

DVD Name	Ep #	Release dates	
DVD Name	Ep #	Region 1	Region 2
The Complete 1st Season	23	March 2, 2004; March 4, 2014 (re-release)	March 15, 2004
The Complete 2nd Season	25	July 20, 2004	July 19, 2004
The Complete 3rd Season	23	March 15, 2005	February 28, 2005
The Complete 4th and Final Season	22	October 17, 2006	February 13, 2006
The Complete Series	93	November 11, 2014	November 20, 2006

== International broadcasts ==
- On March 15, 1979, in Italy, Starsky and Hutch was aired on Rai Due, achieving smash-hit status. In 1987, it was broadcast again, this time in the late afternoon, on Italia 1 and, in 2007, on Rai Tre at lunchtime. After some reruns on Italia 1 and AXN, in 2009, the series appeared Mondays on Fox Retro. It was aired in the early morning on Rete 4. In Summer 2015, it was aired on La7.
- In France, the show was shown on TF1 between 1978 and 1984, and subsequently on other channels. The French version replaces the original theme(s) with a French song, singing about "Starsky et Hutch". The voices of Jacques Balutin and Francis Lax, the two French actors dubbing the series, played a part in the popularity of the series in France as well as their adding comedic ad-libs whenever possible. One of the voice-over actors later said that David Soul had acknowledged that he and Paul Michael Glaser had to be much more restrained when they played.
- In the United Kingdom, the series was an immediate hit when it began showing on Saturday nights on BBC1 (debuting April 23, 1976, and soon catching up with American broadcasts), with occasional repeats through to the early 1990s. During its prime-time run, however, the BBC heavily edited certain episodes; in fact, the first-series episode "The Fix" (in which mobsters inject Hutch with heroin in order to extract information from him) was deemed too graphic and was effectively "banned" from all the corporation's runs of the series. "The Fix" wasn't shown on British-terrestrial television until May 31, 1999, as part of Channel 4's "Starsky & Hutch Night," which also included the pilot, The Word on the Street - a documentary about the series - and the second-series episode "Gillian". The BBC broadcast the series in a different order to the American run, and as the Radio Times listings did not always give episode titles, the exact first-run order for the series is not entirely clear. "Savage Sunday" was omitted from the first Season One broadcast, and there is no listed later airing of the episode. There are also no Radio Times listed airdates for the episodes "Vendetta," "Nightmare," "Bloodbath," or "Murder Ward." The series was rerun by Five in 2003 in a 10 a.m. slot (later 11 a.m., and eventually moving to a 2:30 p.m. slot); was also shown on the UK satellite channel Granada Plus, and is now running on Zone Thriller, which was rebranded as CBS Action in November 2009. The channel has broadcast all episodes, with minor edits in a few cases. In August 2019, the channel True Entertainment, which later became Sony Channel, are now showing repeats.
- The first season is frequently aired on MBC 2 in the Middle East.
- In Australia it airs on Digital Channel Go!. In 2014, it started to be shown on 7mate. It was a perennial favourite, seen on the Nine Network from 1975 to 1991 and, lastly, on ABC Television in 1992. Prior to GO!, it screened on TV1.
- In Indonesia, the show was aired on RCTI from 1990 to 1994.
- In Malaysia it currently reruns on RTM's TV2, placed in Best of Retro slot, in 2009.
- In Venezuela, the show was aired on Venevisión.
- In Mexico, it was broadcast on Televisa.
- In Algeria, the show was aired in French on ENTV state television during the second half of the 80's, and was a big success.
- In Puerto Rico, the show was aired on WKAQ-TV, Channel 2 (Telemundo) during the mid to late 70's. It was dubbed in Spanish.
- In Japan, the show was aired on TBS Television from 1977 to 1981.

== Cars ==
Stunt cars, camera cars, tow cars, dolly cars, and cars used for "beauty" shots varied in model year from 1974 to 1976 Ford Torinos, since the body style of the Gran Torino was unchanged.

Originally, Blinn was to have Starsky drive a Chevrolet Camaro convertible because he fondly remembered a green and white one that he owned. However, when production started on the pilot episode, Ford Motor Company's Studio-TV Car Loan Program was the lease supplier for Spelling-Goldberg.

They looked at lease stock and chose two 1975 351 Windsor V8-powered (VIN code "H") "Bright Red" (paint code 2B) 2-door Gran Torinos. Both cars had a role in the pilot movie, one being "Starsky's" car, and the other being a similar car which is mistaken for Starsky's car by the film's villains. They each had body-side mouldings along with a black interior with vinyl bench seats. One of the pilot cars had the luxury remote-control chrome mirrors installed, while the other pilot car had the cheaper, entry-level manual chrome mirrors installed; in editing the film, Starsky and Hutch are shown to be driving around in each of the two cars at different times during the film.

The cars were also custom painted (on top of the factory red paint color) with the distinctive white "vector" stripe designed by Spelling-Goldberg's transportation coordinator George Grenier. The rear ends were lifted by air shocks, and had Ansen Sprint 5-slot mag wheels added with larger rear tires. While the tires were mounted so that only the black wall side would show, thus hiding any unauthorized brand-name display, in one first-season episode ("Kill Huggy Bear"), a close-up shot of the villain cutting the rear brake lines shows the letters on the inside-facing side of the tires to say Firestone.

It is reported that the original 2.75:1 ratio rear axle gearing (standard on non-police Torinos from 1975 onward) was replaced with numerically higher ratio gears for better acceleration during stunt driving scenes; in the 1999 interview, Glaser said that "we finally had to get a new rear end put in it so that at zero to sixty it had some pop". At least one of the second-season cars was known to have a Dymo label prominently attached to the dashboard which read "DO NOT EXCEED 50 MPH"; this was probably due to the fact that the revised gearing would cause the engine RPM to go to a higher level, possibly leading to engine damage.

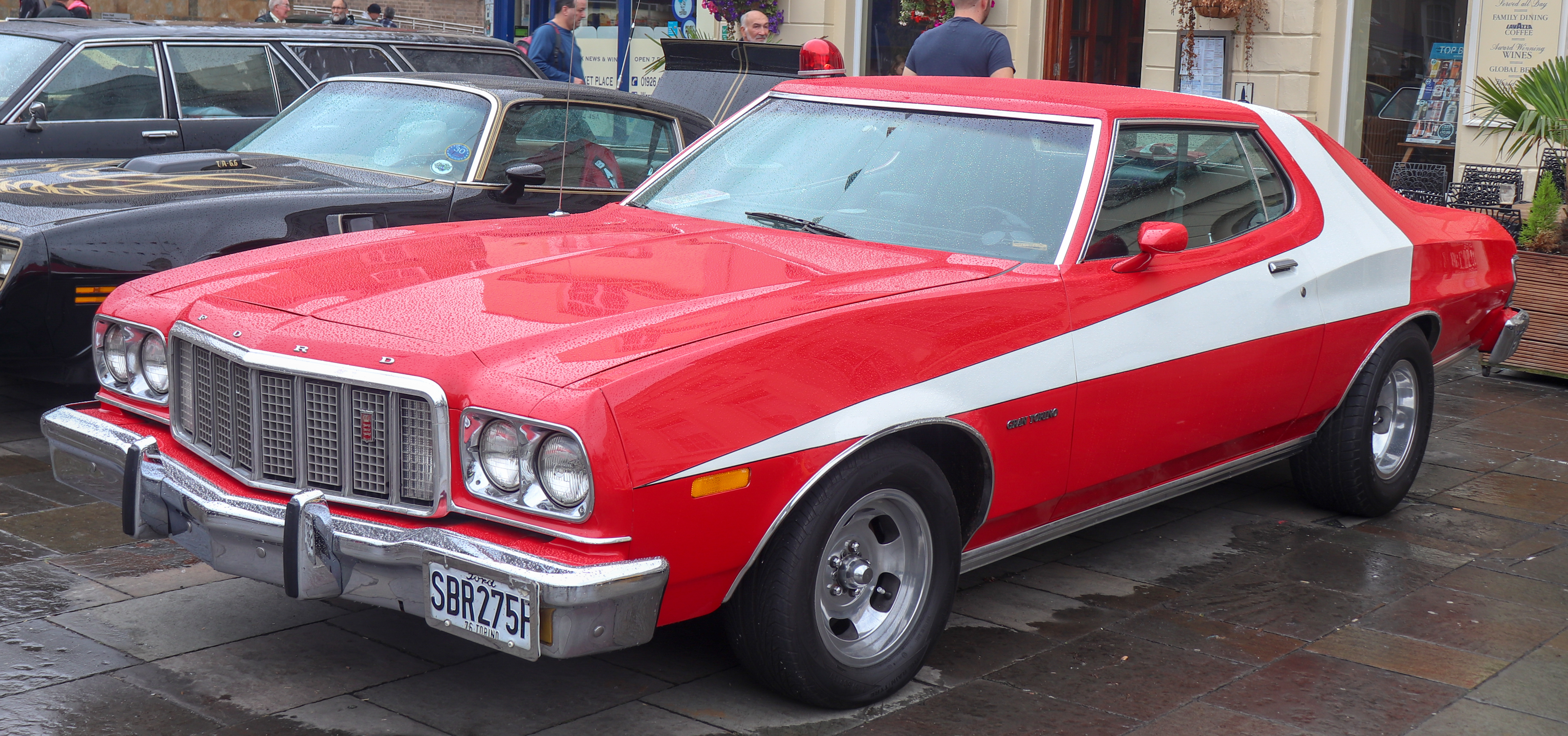
Replica of the Ford Gran Torino used in the TV/motion picture Starsky & Hutch.

In the "Behind the Badge" interviews, Glaser said that during the early stages of production of the pilot, Spelling took him outside to introduce him to the red & white-striped, mag-wheeled Torino. Glaser took an immediate and long-lasting dislike to the car, which has not changed to this day. According to Glaser in several early interviews, there were three main reasons why he instantly hated the car: First, in his opinion, it was big, ugly and childish-looking. Secondly, the idea that two undercover cops would drive around in a car with such an outlandish appearance seemed ludicrous, and lastly, he does not like Ford products (although in a picture that was printed in an issue of the National Enquirer, Glaser is shown on the side of a California freeway with a flat-tired Ford Explorer). At the first viewing of the car with David Soul (Hutch), Glaser remarked that the car looked like a "striped tomato". That nickname stuck, and very soon the show's writers had worked it into the show as Hutch's derogatory name for Starsky's beloved Torino.

Glaser remarked to Soul that he hated the car and that he was "going to destroy that car...burn it down every chance I get", and repeated the story in the 1999 "reunion" interview. Several scenes of Glaser driving the car show him smashing the front wheels into curbs as he slides the car around corners and such, but that may also be attributable to the fact that he is primarily an actor, not a trained stunt-driver. Over the years, the Starsky & Hutch Torino increased in popularity and became a much-loved icon of the show and of the Seventies in general. Glaser has not grown to appreciate the car as he has learned to simply accept its popularity as a necessary component of the fans' appreciation of the show.

In fact, during filming of the 2004 Starsky & Hutch film adaptation, Glaser had several opportunities to sit in the newest iteration of "his" car, and even drive them, but he refused. He just was not interested, but in 2004, during the last day of filming a movie in Canada, the crew wanted a group picture of Glaser with a Starsky and Hutch Torino, so he agreed to sit in the driver's seat of a Limited Edition replica with the crew surrounding the car. In the summer of 2012 during the introduction to the "Las Vegas Car Stars 2012" charity event, Glaser drove up in a S&H Torino replica; after being introduced by the master of ceremonies, he got out of the Torino and was cheered by the crowd.

High-performance engine sounds were dubbed over scenes during the show because California law forbade mechanically modifying the engines of new cars. When the pilot was successful, Spelling-Goldberg ordered two new 1975 red Gran Torinos for the first season. These cars were powered by 400 V8s (VIN code "S") because extra power was going to be needed for additional stunt driving scenes. These new cars for the first-season were factory ordered in the bright-red color (Ford paint code: 2B), which was a regular production color for 1975 Torinos.

Unlike the pilot-movie cars, the first-season Torinos had no body-side mouldings, but did have body-colored sport mirrors, and brocade cloth split-bench seats. With the acquisition of the new cars, the producers took the opportunity to improve the design of the white stripe painted on the cars. The original pilot-movie cars had the bottom horizontal edge of the stripe about an inch or so above the mid-body character line that ran along the car, which was apparently done so that the section of the stripe that passes above the front-wheel opening would not be cut off by the wheel opening, but for the first-season cars, the bottom horizontal edge of the stripe was lowered until directly on the crease, which gave a more cohesive look to the design of the stripe. The section of stripe that runs across the front-wheel opening was gradually curved up and around the opening. The stripe was also thicker on the roof section, and whereas the front pointed section ended well behind the amber marker light on the pilot cars, the newer design had the point ending far ahead of it on the front fascia piece. These new cars also featured the complete bumper-protection group option, which included horizontal black rub-strips on both bumpers that were not included on the pilot cars.

For the start of the second season, these were replaced by two 1976 Gran Torinos that had vinyl split-bench seats like the pilot-episode cars. The new cars were ordered under Ford's fleet program, which is what was required to get them painted in the previous year's Bright Red(2B), as Ford used a different shade of red for new standard-order Torinos by this point.

These newer cars can be identified by their silver sight shields (bumper-filler panels) which Ford used on specially painted fleet-ordered cars. They also had the luxury-chrome mirrors like one of the pilot cars. Even though the body-colored sport mirrors were still a Torino option in 1976, they could not be installed on a fleet-ordered specialty-painted car, as Ford had no provision for producing those mirrors in anything other than the regular production colors listed for that year; since the 2B bright red was a special fleet-ordered color for the '76 model year, the cars came equipped with the chrome mirrors. The body-side mouldings were installed on these cars and the stripe was, unlike the pilot cars, integrated with the mouldings.

They were powered by 460 Lima V8s (VIN code "A"), and Spelling-Goldberg kept these Torinos until production ceased. While these were the biggest, most powerful engines available from Ford at the time, even with dual exhaust, they were still somewhat underpowered at 202 net horsepower. A third car, owned by 20th Century Fox and 351 Windsor powered, was used as the first backup to the Ford lease cars.

Over time, an unforeseen problem was discovered with the Torinos when they were used during stunt driving scenes. In sharp right-hand turns, Soul would sometimes slide accidentally across the vinyl bench into Glaser. Although a potential safety hazard at the time, the problem was solved by replacing the front bench of the number two Torino with bucket seats at Glaser and Soul's request; Glaser said in 1999: "It took us a year to get them to put bucket seats in it so David wouldn't slide all over the place whenever I took a corner".

The aggressive stunt driving required of the show resulted in many accidents and fender-benders for the Torinos. The time demands of a weekly production mandated quick body and paint repairs so the cars could get back to work as soon as possible, and many of the quick and often sloppy repairs are quite evident to eagle-eyed viewers of the show. The front fenders seemed to have taken a lot of abuse, and the Gran Torino nameplates on the front fenders are missing in several episodes, as are the chrome wheelhouse moldings.

Towards the end of the four seasons of production, the Torinos were noticeably worse-for-wear, and close watchers of the later episodes will spot many dents and other damage on the cars as they appear in various episodes. In particular, the driver's side quarter panel and tail-light area were seen to be smashed up in 4th-season episodes, and at least one of the cars was shown to have a dented and twisted front bumper along with some visible damage to the grille behind. The last appearance of the Torino on the series seems to show that the driver's door and window will not even close correctly, possibly due to the rigours and effects of the spirited stunt driving the car suffered over the years.

Glaser deliberately mistreated the cars during close-up stunt scenes when he drove (this was admitted to in a 1997 letter he wrote to the owner of the #1 Torino; and in a first-season DVD interview he said that he tried to "destroy" the cars) and would often stop the car by hitting the front wheels against curbs, as well as coming into driveways at high speed and bumping into garbage dumpsters.

Due to the success of S&H, in 1976 (the Torino's final year) Ford released a limited edition (only 1,305 units total, plus three pilot production cars) Starsky and Hutch replica Gran Torino. Manufactured at the Chicago plant, one of these code "PS 122" units was leased by Spelling-Goldberg from the middle of season two until the series' end as a second backup for the main cars and was known simply as "Unit 129". It was originally equipped with a 351 Modified (also VIN code "H"); however, during filming, one of the stuntmen damaged the engine beyond repair, and it was replaced overnight with a 429 Lima V8.

During the last season of Starsky & Hutch, The Dukes of Hazzard premiered on CBS, and one of the factory replicas was used in the first episode, "One Armed Bandits", seen to be driven by regular character Cooter Davenport (Ben L. Jones). This was the only appearance of the Torino in the series, and many fans have speculated over its strange one-off appearance. One theory is that it was merely an in-joke, with the Torino's former iconic car status now being taken over by the Dukes' Dodge Charger car "The General Lee".

After Starsky & Hutch was canceled, the cars were returned to Ford's Studio-TV Car Lease Program and sold at a Ford Motor Company auction to A.E. Barber Ford of Ventura, California. The first retail sale of Torino #1 was to a resident of Ojai, California; he owned it for one year, then sold it in a private sale to an Air Force officer that owned it for 17 years. In 1988, Torino #1 was purchased by an Ohio resident; he sold it in 2012 to Cars of the Stars Motor Museum in the United Kingdom. A few years later, Torino #1 was sold to Dezer Car Collection in Miami, Florida. Dezer sold Torino #1 in a private auction in January 2015 to a Texas collector; at the time, it was mostly unrestored and somewhat battered due to wear and tear from TV-show filming and subsequent ownership. It still had its original 460 V8, interior, and paint; however, Mickey Thompson valve covers and a chrome air cleaner were added by the first owner after he purchased it from Barber Ford. The Texas collector has since done a "sympathetic" frame-off restoration. Torino #2 is owned by a New Jersey man who supplied the main close-up Torino (featured on the movie posters) for 2004's big-screen Starsky & Hutch movie.

During its life after Starsky & Hutch, #2 was wrecked and sold as salvage. It was repaired, although it was repainted the wrong shade of red and the iconic stripe was improperly painted. Although still equipped with bucket seats, #2 no longer has its original 460 engine, which was replaced at some point with a 2.8-liter Ford V-6. The car underwent a full restoration in a Pennsylvania Shop and is back on the road. Finally, the 20th Century Fox Torino was purchased in 2009 by the owner of #2, sold to an Oklahoma couple in 2010, and restored. "Unit 129" was owned by a collector in New Hampshire; as of May 2018, it is for sale by a Florida collector vehicle dealer.

In addition, the Torino has many fans and sparked a collectors market in the United Kingdom, as evidenced by the large number of UK-owned replicas (both factory and aftermarket). The red Torino's fame also led to a number of people customizing their own red vehicles with the distinctive white vector stripe, and with varying levels of success.

== Theme music ==
The first season of the show had a dark and ominous theme written by Lalo Schifrin that seemed to fit the hard action and violence of the season; the main title version was edited down from the chase climax cue of his score for the pilot episode (the climax contains the shot of Hutch leaping off a fire escape and landing on his car which appears in the opening titles of all subsequent episodes). The end credits featured a similar piece of ominous music.

The first season theme was replaced for the second season by a Tom Scott written theme entitled "Gotcha". "Gotcha" is the best known of the show's themes, and has been covered by several musicians, including the James Taylor Quartet and The Ventures. It also appears on the title screen of the Nintendo Entertainment System game Treasure Master, covered by Tim Follin. A version of "Gotcha" was featured on Scott's 1977 album Blow It Out and is also on the album Best of Tom Scott. For the third season, a more dramatic theme was used that highlighted the show's move to more socially conscious and light-hearted stories. It was written by Mark Snow and released on an LP around 1979.

A reworked "Gotcha", similar in style (but not identical) to the version on Blow It Out, returned for the fourth and last season. The revamped version was the most easy-going of the different themes for the series, reflecting the last season's increased "buddy cop" feel.

Schifrin, Scott and Snow also scored several episodes; Alan Silvestri also worked on the series, scoring three episodes.

== Reception ==
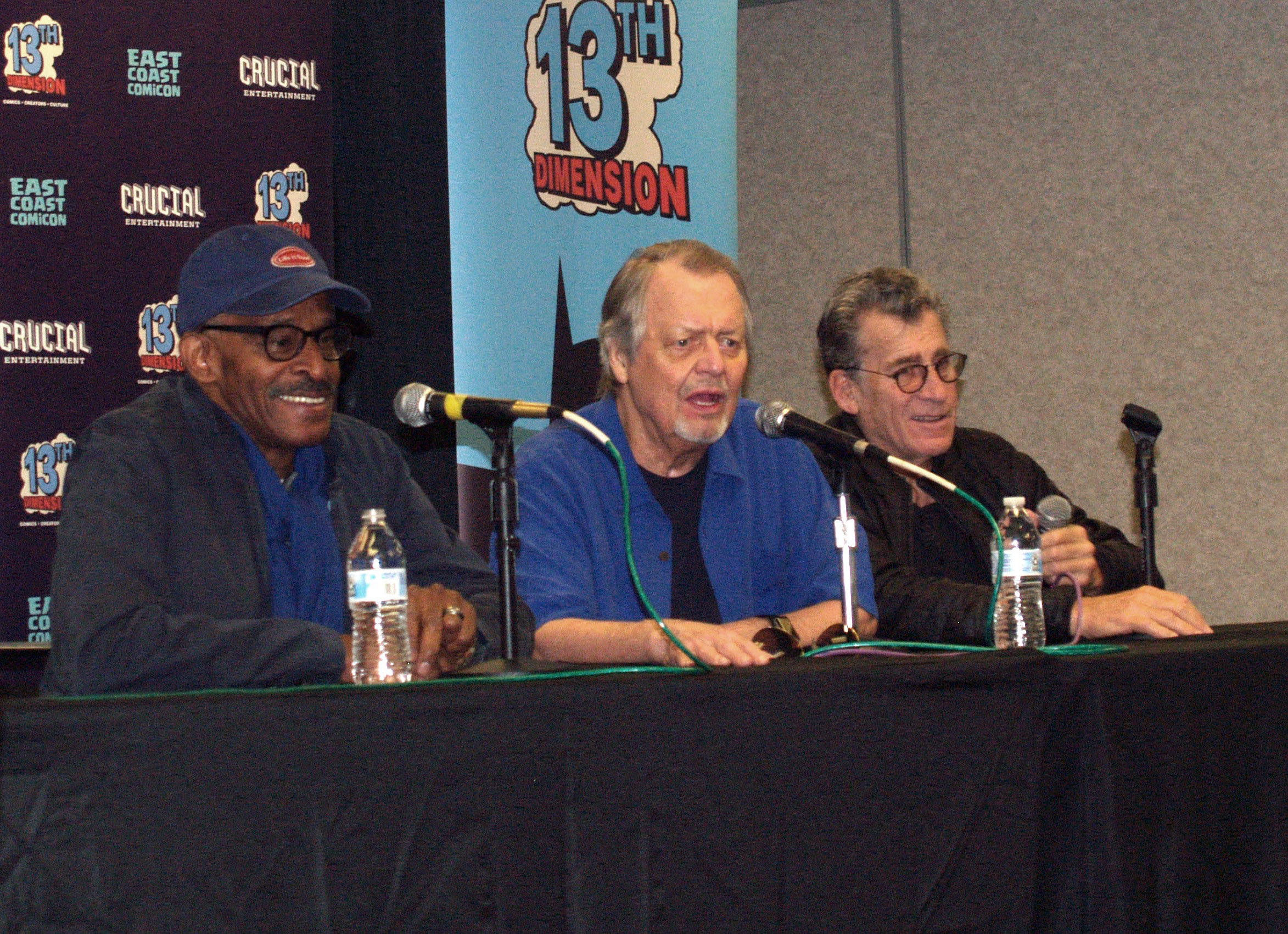
Panel discussion featuring Antonio Fargas, David Soul and Paul Michael Glaser at the 2018 East Coast Comicon in New Jersey.

Retrospective reviews have been generally positive. Television Heaven described the show as a "worldwide smash of seventies cool" and the perfect example of the "mismatched buddy sub-genre." According to the website movieplayer.it, Starsky & Hutch is in second place among the best TV series of the seventies, and in seventieth place in the ranking of the 100 best TV series of all time.

== Other media ==
=== Tie-in novels ===
A series of novels by Max Franklin (Richard Deming) were published by Ballantine Books in the United States and the United Kingdom between 1976 and 1978. The American and British editions were identical except that the words "ABC series" on the covers were changed to "BBC series" for the British editions. Each book was a novelisation of a specific TV series episode, with the original script writer(s) credited on the cover.

- Starsky & Hutch # 1 (novelisation of pilot episode)
- Starsky & Hutch # 2 (novelisation of "Kill Huggy Bear")
- Starsky & Hutch # 3 (novelisation of "Death Ride")
- Starsky & Hutch # 4 (novelisation of "Bounty Hunter")
- Starsky & Hutch # 5 (novelisation of "Terror on the Docks")
- Starsky & Hutch # 6 (novelisation of "The Psychic")
- Starsky & Hutch # 7 (novelisation of "The Set-Up: Parts 1&2")
- Starsky & Hutch # 8 (novelisation of "Starsky & Hutch on Voodoo Island: Parts 1&2")

=== Film ===
A theatrical film produced by Weed Road Pictures and Red Hour Productions and distributed by Warner Bros. Pictures and Dimension Films was released in theatres on March 5, 2004. The film stars Ben Stiller as Starsky, Owen Wilson as Hutch and Snoop Dogg as Huggy Bear, as they attempt to stop a drug kingpin played by Vince Vaughn. The film grossed $170 million worldwide against a $60 million production budget.

=== Video game ===
A video game based on the series was developed by Mind's Eye Productions and published by Empire Interactive for PlayStation 2, Xbox, GameCube, Microsoft Windows, and Game Boy Advance in 2003. The game combines driving and shooting gameplay and features the original voice of Huggy Bear, Antonio Fargas.

=== Television series reboot ===
In February 2023, The Hollywood Reporter reported that a "modern reimagining" of the series was being developed with a female-led cast. The plot would follow two female detectives, Sasha Starsky and Nicole Hutchinson, who would be attempting to uncover the truth behind their fathers' wrongful imprisonment 15 years prior. At that time, no actors were attached to the potential new series, though Sam Sklaver and Elizabeth Peterson were attached as writers and showrunners, while Sony Pictures Television and Fox Entertainment would be the production companies. As of November 2026, no other updates have been provided regarding the status of any potential reboot.
