= Jeff Gordon XS Racing =

1999 video game

- PC cover art
- Developers: Real Sports (PC); Natsume Co., Ltd. (GBC)
- Publisher: ASC Games
- Platforms: Microsoft Windows; Game Boy Color
- Release: Windows: NA: May 26, 1999; Game Boy Color: NA: November 17, 1999
- Genre: Racing
- Mode: Single-player

Jeff Gordon XS Racing is a 1999 racing video game for Microsoft Windows and Game Boy Color. The game features then three time NASCAR Winston Cup Series champion Jeff Gordon. The game's Game Boy version has link cable support.

== Gameplay ==
Set in the year 2012, Jeff Gordon XS Racing lets the player drive a "next-generation" stock car against 39 other drivers (four other drivers in the Game Boy version), and any damage that the car sustains will repair itself. The game has a time trial mode, where the player can practice and try to achieve their fastest lap on the track. The game has a championship mode, where the player takes part in a ten-race series. After the player finishes the first season, Gordon will appear as an opposing driver, with a higher AI than the others. The game also has sponsorships from companies like Pepsi, Fritos, and 7-Eleven.

== Development ==
In 1997 NASCAR champion Jeff Gordon and ASC Games announced that they were collaborating on a line of racing video games. Gordon was involved in the development of the game, giving developers feedback and tuning instructions. Plans for PlayStation and Nintendo 64 versions were cancelled.

== Reception ==
Reception

Aggregate score
Aggregator	Score	
Aggregator	GBC	PC
GameRankings	50%	58%

Review scores
Publication	Score	
Publication	GBC	PC
AllGame	2.5/5	3.5/5
CNET Gamecenter	N/A	3/10
Computer Games Strategy Plus	N/A	4.5/5
Computer Gaming World	N/A	1/5
GamePro	N/A	4.5/5
GameRevolution	N/A	C+
GameSpot	N/A	6.9/10
GameZone	N/A	9/10
IGN	5/10	7/10
Next Generation	N/A	2/5
PC Accelerator	N/A	3/10
PC Gamer (US)	N/A	38%

The game received mixed reviews on both platforms according to the review aggregation website GameRankings. Daniel Erickson of NextGen called the PC version a "well conceived yet repetitive effort [that] lands squarely toward the back of the pack."
