= The Mutant Virus: Crisis in a Computer World =

1992 video game

- Cover art
- Developer: Rocket Science Production
- Publisher: ASC Games
- Producers: Col Stone, Ernie Cormier
- Programmer: Andrew Frank
- Artist: Frank Lam
- Composer: Stuart Ross
- Platform: NES
- Release: NA: April 1992
- Genre: Action
- Mode: Single-player

The Mutant Virus: Crisis in a Computer World is an action video game released by ASC Games for the NES in April 1992.

== Gameplay ==
A screen shot showing Gliders being created by a Gosper Glider Gun

The plot centers around protagonist, Ron, and his fight to eliminate a virus out of a global A.I. that is responsible for every aspect of technology in the game's present day. If Ron is unable to extinguish the virus, humanity will be thrown back to the Stone Age. The player controls a miniature "space ship" which shoots anti-virus and other variations of the weapon to try to contain the virus in that room.

The virus in the game is a cellular automaton following the rules of Conway's Game of Life, with the exception that each cell is either a virus cell (green) or a clean cell (light blue). As new cells are made, they either become virus cells or clean cells depending on which type makes up the majority of their neighbors.

== See also ==
- List of Nintendo Entertainment System games
