= Crown jewels (disambiguation) =

Crown jewels are precious regalia used in the coronation of a monarch

- Crown Jewels of the United Kingdom

Crown jewels or Crown Jewels may also refer to:

- The Crown Jewels (box set), eight-album box set by the rock group Queen
- Crown Jewels (film), 1950 West German crime film
- The Crown Jewels (film), a 2011 Swedish drama
- MS Cunard Crown Jewel, cruise ship
- Crown Jewel Defense, when a company divests its most attractive assets to discourage a hostile takeover
- Crown jewels of British sport, which must be broadcast on free-to-air television
- Ironstone's Crown Jewel, the world's largest piece of crystalline gold
- "The crown jewels", nickname for documents leaked by Clive Ponting in 1984
- NASCAR Crown Jewel races
- WWE Crown Jewel, a professional wrestling pay-per-view series
- The Crown Jewels (novel), a 1987 novel by Walter Jon Williams

== See also ==
- The Jewel in the Crown (disambiguation)
