= 1998 NAPA Autocare 500 =

27th race of the 1998 NASCAR Winston Cup Series

Race details
- Race 27 of 33 in the 1998 NASCAR Winston Cup Series
- The 1998 NAPA Autocare 500 program cover.
- Date: September 27, 1998
- Location: Ridgeway, Virginia, Martinsville Speedway
- Course: Permanent racing facility
- Course length: 0.526 miles (0.847 km)
- Distance: 500 laps, 263 mi (423.257 km)
- Average speed: 73.35 miles per hour (118.05 km/h)

Pole position
Driver	Ernie Irvan	MB2 Motorsports
- Time: 20.229

Most laps led
Driver	Sterling Marlin	Team SABCO
- Laps: 231

Winner
No. 10	Ricky Rudd	Rudd Performance Motorsports

Television in the United States
- Network: ESPN
- Announcers: Bob Jenkins, Ned Jarrett, Benny Parsons

Radio in the United States
- Radio: Motor Racing Network

The 1998 NAPA Autocare 500 was the 27th stock car race of the 1998 NASCAR Winston Cup Series season and the 50th iteration of the event. The race was held on Sunday, September 27, 1998, in Martinsville, Virginia at Martinsville Speedway, a 0.526 miles (0.847 km) permanent oval-shaped short track. The race took the scheduled 500 laps to complete. Battling immense heat, Rudd Performance Motorsports driver Ricky Rudd would manage to dominate the late stages of the race to take his 20th career NASCAR Winston Cup Series victory and his only victory of the season. To fill out the podium, Hendrick Motorsports driver Jeff Gordon and Roush Racing driver Mark Martin would finish second and third, respectively.

== Background ==
The layout of Martinsville Speedway, the venue where the race was held.

Martinsville Speedway is a NASCAR-owned stock car racing track located in Henry County, in Ridgeway, Virginia, just to the south of Martinsville. At 0.526 miles (0.847 km) in length, it is the shortest track in the NASCAR Cup Series. The track was also one of the first paved oval tracks in NASCAR, being built in 1947 by H. Clay Earles. It is also the only remaining race track that has been on the NASCAR circuit from its beginning in 1948.

=== Entry list ===
- (R) denotes rookie driver.

#	Driver	Team	Make
1	Steve Park (R)	Dale Earnhardt, Inc.	Chevrolet
2	Rusty Wallace	Penske-Kranefuss Racing	Ford
3	Dale Earnhardt	Richard Childress Racing	Chevrolet
4	Bobby Hamilton	Morgan–McClure Motorsports	Chevrolet
5	Terry Labonte	Hendrick Motorsports	Chevrolet
6	Mark Martin	Roush Racing	Ford
7	Geoff Bodine	Mattei Motorsports	Ford
9	Jerry Nadeau (R)	Melling Racing	Ford
10	Ricky Rudd	Rudd Performance Motorsports	Ford
11	Brett Bodine	Brett Bodine Racing	Ford
12	Jeremy Mayfield	Penske-Kranefuss Racing	Ford
13	Dennis Setzer	Elliott-Marino Racing	Ford
16	Kevin Lepage (R)	Roush Racing	Ford
18	Bobby Labonte	Joe Gibbs Racing	Pontiac
21	Michael Waltrip	Wood Brothers Racing	Ford
22	Ward Burton	Bill Davis Racing	Pontiac
23	Jimmy Spencer	Travis Carter Enterprises	Ford
24	Jeff Gordon	Hendrick Motorsports	Chevrolet
26	Johnny Benson Jr.	Roush Racing	Ford
28	Kenny Irwin Jr. (R)	Robert Yates Racing	Ford
30	Derrike Cope	Bahari Racing	Pontiac
31	Mike Skinner	Richard Childress Racing	Chevrolet
33	Ken Schrader	Andy Petree Racing	Chevrolet
35	Darrell Waltrip	Tyler Jet Motorsports	Pontiac
36	Ernie Irvan	MB2 Motorsports	Pontiac
40	Sterling Marlin	Team SABCO	Chevrolet
41	David Green	Larry Hedrick Motorsports	Chevrolet
42	Joe Nemechek	Team SABCO	Chevrolet
43	John Andretti	Petty Enterprises	Pontiac
44	Kyle Petty	Petty Enterprises	Pontiac
46	Jeff Green	Team SABCO	Chevrolet
50	Wally Dallenbach Jr.	Hendrick Motorsports	Chevrolet
71	Dave Marcis	Marcis Auto Racing	Chevrolet
75	Rick Mast	Butch Mock Motorsports	Ford
77	Ted Musgrave	Jasper Motorsports	Ford
78	Gary Bradberry	Triad Motorsports	Ford
79	Ken Bouchard	T.R.I.X. Racing	Chevrolet
81	Kenny Wallace	FILMAR Racing	Ford
85	Randy MacDonald	Mansion Motorsports	Ford
88	Dale Jarrett	Robert Yates Racing	Ford
90	Dick Trickle	Donlavey Racing	Ford
91	Todd Bodine	LJ Racing	Chevrolet
94	Bill Elliott	Elliott-Marino Racing	Ford
96	Mike Bliss	American Equipment Racing	Chevrolet
97	Chad Little	Roush Racing	Ford
98	Rich Bickle	Cale Yarborough Motorsports	Ford
99	Jeff Burton	Roush Racing	Ford

== Practice ==
=== First practice ===
The first practice session was held on Friday, September 25, at 11:00 a.m. EST. Jeff Burton, driving for Roush Racing, would set the fastest time in the session, with a lap of 20.239 and an average speed of 93.562 miles per hour (150.573 km/h).

Pos.	#	Driver	Team	Make	Time	Speed
1	99	Jeff Burton	Roush Racing	Ford	20.239	93.562
2	36	Ernie Irvan	MB2 Motorsports	Pontiac	20.264	93.447
3	44	Kyle Petty	Petty Enterprises	Pontiac	20.290	93.327
Full first practice results

=== Final practice ===
The final practice session, sometimes referred to as Happy Hour, was held on Saturday, September 26. Mark Martin, driving for Roush Racing, would set the fastest time in the session, with a lap of 20.561 and an average speed of 92.097 miles per hour (148.216 km/h).

Pos.	#	Driver	Team	Make	Time	Speed
1	6	Mark Martin	Roush Racing	Ford	20.561	92.097
2	43	John Andretti	Petty Enterprises	Pontiac	20.578	92.021
3	99	Jeff Burton	Roush Racing	Ford	20.581	92.007
Full Happy Hour practice results

== Qualifying ==
Qualifying was split into two rounds. The first round was held on Friday, September 25, at 3:00 p.m. EST. Each driver would have one lap to set a time. During the first round, the top 25 drivers in the round would be guaranteed a starting spot in the race. If a driver was not able to guarantee a spot in the first round, they had the option to scrub their time from the first round and try and run a faster lap time in a second round qualifying run, held on Saturday, September 26, at 11:45 a.m. EST. As with the first round, each driver would have one lap to set a time. On January 24, 1998, NASCAR would announce that the amount of provisionals given would be increased from last season. Positions 26-36 would be decided on time, while positions 37-43 would be based on provisionals. Six spots are awarded by the use of provisionals based on owner's points. The seventh is awarded to a past champion who has not otherwise qualified for the race. If no past champion needs the provisional, the next team in the owner points will be awarded a provisional.

Ernie Irvan, driving for MB2 Motorsports, would win the pole, setting a time of 20.229 and an average speed of 93.608 miles per hour (150.647 km/h).

Four drivers would fail to qualify: David Green, Gary Bradberry, Ken Bouchard, and Randy MacDonald.

=== Full qualifying results ===
Pos.	#	Driver	Team	Make	Time	Speed
1	36	Ernie Irvan	MB2 Motorsports	Pontiac	20.229	93.608
2	10	Ricky Rudd	Rudd Performance Motorsports	Ford	20.236	93.576
3	24	Jeff Gordon	Hendrick Motorsports	Chevrolet	20.250	93.511
4	98	Rich Bickle	Cale Yarborough Motorsports	Ford	20.260	93.465
5	50	Wally Dallenbach Jr.	Hendrick Motorsports	Chevrolet	20.288	93.336
6	46	Jeff Green	Team SABCO	Chevrolet	20.289	93.331
7	40	Sterling Marlin	Team SABCO	Chevrolet	20.299	93.285
8	43	John Andretti	Petty Enterprises	Pontiac	20.312	93.226
9	77	Ted Musgrave	Jasper Motorsports	Ford	20.344	93.079
10	88	Dale Jarrett	Robert Yates Racing	Ford	20.360	93.006
11	11	Brett Bodine	Brett Bodine Racing	Ford	20.362	92.997
12	91	Todd Bodine	LJ Racing	Chevrolet	20.370	92.960
13	6	Mark Martin	Roush Racing	Ford	20.377	92.928
14	13	Dennis Setzer	Elliott-Marino Racing	Ford	20.383	92.901
15	22	Ward Burton	Bill Davis Racing	Pontiac	20.384	92.896
16	99	Jeff Burton	Roush Racing	Ford	20.407	92.792
17	2	Rusty Wallace	Penske-Kranefuss Racing	Ford	20.417	92.746
18	33	Ken Schrader	Andy Petree Racing	Chevrolet	20.426	92.705
19	4	Bobby Hamilton	Morgan–McClure Motorsports	Chevrolet	20.428	92.696
20	94	Bill Elliott	Elliott-Marino Racing	Ford	20.431	92.683
21	18	Bobby Labonte	Joe Gibbs Racing	Pontiac	20.433	92.674
22	42	Joe Nemechek	Team SABCO	Chevrolet	20.433	92.674
23	31	Mike Skinner	Richard Childress Racing	Chevrolet	20.439	92.646
24	26	Johnny Benson Jr.	Roush Racing	Ford	20.446	92.615
25	96	Mike Bliss	American Equipment Racing	Chevrolet	20.452	92.588
26	81	Kenny Wallace	FILMAR Racing	Ford	20.437	92.655
27	21	Michael Waltrip	Wood Brothers Racing	Ford	20.466	92.524
28	7	Geoff Bodine	Mattei Motorsports	Ford	20.469	92.511
29	5	Terry Labonte	Hendrick Motorsports	Chevrolet	20.472	92.497
30	35	Darrell Waltrip	Tyler Jet Motorsports	Pontiac	20.491	92.411
31	97	Chad Little	Roush Racing	Ford	20.495	92.393
32	12	Jeremy Mayfield	Penske-Kranefuss Racing	Ford	20.516	92.299
33	3	Dale Earnhardt	Richard Childress Racing	Chevrolet	20.525	92.258
34	90	Dick Trickle	Donlavey Racing	Ford	20.538	92.200
35	16	Kevin Lepage (R)	Roush Racing	Ford	20.541	92.186
36	44	Kyle Petty	Petty Enterprises	Pontiac	20.554	92.128
Provisionals
37	23	Jimmy Spencer	Travis Carter Enterprises	Ford	-*	-*
38	1	Steve Park (R)	Dale Earnhardt, Inc.	Chevrolet	-*	-*
39	28	Kenny Irwin Jr. (R)	Robert Yates Racing	Ford	-*	-*
40	9	Jerry Nadeau (R)	Melling Racing	Ford	-*	-*
41	75	Rick Mast	Butch Mock Motorsports	Ford	-*	-*
42	30	Derrike Cope	Bahari Racing	Pontiac	-*	-*
43	71	Dave Marcis	Marcis Auto Racing	Chevrolet	-*	-*
Failed to qualify
44	41	David Green	Larry Hedrick Motorsports	Chevrolet	20.572	92.047
45	78	Gary Bradberry	Triad Motorsports	Ford	20.678	91.576
46	79	Ken Bouchard	T.R.I.X. Racing	Chevrolet	20.746	91.275
47	85	Randy MacDonald	Mansion Motorsports	Ford	20.810	90.995
Official qualifying results

== Race results ==
Fin	St	#	Driver	Team	Make	Laps	Led	Status	Pts	Winnings
1	2	10	Ricky Rudd	Rudd Performance Motorsports	Ford	500	198	running	180	$102,575
2	3	24	Jeff Gordon	Hendrick Motorsports	Chevrolet	500	0	running	170	$73,525
3	13	6	Mark Martin	Roush Racing	Ford	500	0	running	165	$56,875
4	4	98	Rich Bickle	Cale Yarborough Motorsports	Ford	500	0	running	160	$54,525
5	16	99	Jeff Burton	Roush Racing	Ford	500	16	running	160	$46,925
6	29	5	Terry Labonte	Hendrick Motorsports	Chevrolet	500	0	running	150	$45,525
7	20	94	Bill Elliott	Elliott-Marino Racing	Ford	500	0	running	146	$37,675
8	1	36	Ernie Irvan	MB2 Motorsports	Pontiac	499	14	running	147	$46,100
9	24	26	Johnny Benson Jr.	Roush Racing	Ford	499	0	running	138	$35,400
10	21	18	Bobby Labonte	Joe Gibbs Racing	Pontiac	499	0	running	134	$44,000
11	15	22	Ward Burton	Bill Davis Racing	Pontiac	499	0	running	130	$32,435
12	12	91	Todd Bodine	LJ Racing	Chevrolet	499	0	running	127	$28,000
13	18	33	Ken Schrader	Andy Petree Racing	Chevrolet	499	0	running	124	$32,650
14	19	4	Bobby Hamilton	Morgan–McClure Motorsports	Chevrolet	498	0	running	121	$35,250
15	9	77	Ted Musgrave	Jasper Motorsports	Ford	498	0	running	118	$27,000
16	23	31	Mike Skinner	Richard Childress Racing	Chevrolet	498	0	running	115	$23,950
17	35	16	Kevin Lepage (R)	Roush Racing	Ford	498	0	running	112	$33,550
18	7	40	Sterling Marlin	Team SABCO	Chevrolet	496	231	running	119	$32,755
19	37	23	Jimmy Spencer	Travis Carter Enterprises	Ford	496	0	running	106	$29,500
20	27	21	Michael Waltrip	Wood Brothers Racing	Ford	495	0	running	103	$30,850
21	30	35	Darrell Waltrip	Tyler Jet Motorsports	Pontiac	495	0	running	100	$18,100
22	33	3	Dale Earnhardt	Richard Childress Racing	Chevrolet	495	0	running	97	$32,950
23	32	12	Jeremy Mayfield	Penske-Kranefuss Racing	Ford	495	0	running	94	$28,100
24	38	1	Steve Park (R)	Dale Earnhardt, Inc.	Chevrolet	491	0	running	91	$20,850
25	25	96	Mike Bliss	American Equipment Racing	Chevrolet	491	0	running	88	$17,500
26	43	71	Dave Marcis	Marcis Auto Racing	Chevrolet	489	0	running	85	$17,350
27	39	28	Kenny Irwin Jr. (R)	Robert Yates Racing	Ford	487	0	running	82	$32,200
28	17	2	Rusty Wallace	Penske-Kranefuss Racing	Ford	486	0	running	79	$32,050
29	36	44	Kyle Petty	Petty Enterprises	Pontiac	486	0	running	76	$27,000
30	42	30	Derrike Cope	Bahari Racing	Pontiac	483	0	running	73	$26,750
31	6	46	Jeff Green	Team SABCO	Chevrolet	479	0	running	70	$19,600
32	5	50	Wally Dallenbach Jr.	Hendrick Motorsports	Chevrolet	474	0	running	67	$26,275
33	34	90	Dick Trickle	Donlavey Racing	Ford	462	0	running	64	$23,350
34	11	11	Brett Bodine	Brett Bodine Racing	Ford	453	0	running	61	$23,225
35	40	9	Jerry Nadeau (R)	Melling Racing	Ford	451	0	running	58	$16,100
36	31	97	Chad Little	Roush Racing	Ford	449	0	running	55	$16,025
37	8	43	John Andretti	Petty Enterprises	Pontiac	419	41	running	57	$33,400
38	14	13	Dennis Setzer	Elliott-Marino Racing	Ford	417	0	running	49	$15,750
39	28	7	Geoff Bodine	Mattei Motorsports	Ford	387	0	engine	46	$22,650
40	22	42	Joe Nemechek	Team SABCO	Chevrolet	360	0	engine	43	$22,550
41	41	75	Rick Mast	Butch Mock Motorsports	Ford	341	0	engine	40	$15,450
42	10	88	Dale Jarrett	Robert Yates Racing	Ford	299	0	camshaft	37	$32,350
43	26	81	Kenny Wallace	FILMAR Racing	Ford	150	0	overheating	34	$15,750
Official race results

Previous race: 1998 MBNA Gold 400	NASCAR Winston Cup Series; 1998 season	Next race: 1998 UAW-GM Quality 500
