= 1998 Winston 500 =

29th race of the 1998 NASCAR Winston Cup Series

Race details
- Race 29 of 33 in the 1998 NASCAR Winston Cup Series
- The 1998 Winston 500 program cover, featuring Terry Labonte.
- Date: October 11, 1998
- Official name: 30th Annual Winston 500
- Location: Lincoln, Alabama, Talladega Superspeedway
- Course: Permanent racing facility
- Course length: 2.66 miles (4.28 km)
- Distance: 188 laps, 500.08 mi (804.8 km)
- Average speed: 159.318 miles per hour (256.397 km/h)

Pole position
Driver	Ken Schrader	Andy Petree Racing
- Time: 48.819

Most laps led
Driver	Mike Skinner	Richard Childress Racing
- Laps: 74

Winner
No. 88	Dale Jarrett	Robert Yates Racing

Television in the United States
- Network: ESPN
- Announcers: Bob Jenkins, Ned Jarrett, Benny Parsons

Radio in the United States
- Radio: Motor Racing Network

The 1998 Winston 500 was the 29th stock car race of the 1998 NASCAR Winston Cup Series season, the last of five races of that year's Winston No Bull 5, and the 29th iteration of the event. The race was held on Sunday, October 11, 1998, in Lincoln, Alabama at Talladega Superspeedway, a 2.66 miles (4.28 km) permanent triangle-shaped superspeedway. The race took the scheduled 188 laps to complete. In the last 13 laps of the race, Robert Yates Racing driver Dale Jarrett would manage to defend the field to take his 18th career NASCAR Winston Cup Series victory, his third and final victory of the season, and a US$1,000,000 (adjusted for inflation, US$1,975,296) bonus for claiming the Winston No Bull 5 bonus. To fill out the top three, Jeff Gordon and Terry Labonte, both driving for Hendrick Motorsports, would finish second and third, respectively.

== Background ==
The layout of Talladega Superspeedway, the venue where the race was held.

Talladega Superspeedway, originally known as Alabama International Motor Superspeedway (AIMS), is a motorsports complex located north of Talladega, Alabama. It is located on the former Anniston Air Force Base in the small city of Lincoln. The track is a tri-oval and was constructed in the 1960s by the International Speedway Corporation, a business controlled by the France family. Talladega is most known for its steep banking and the unique location of the start/finish line that's located just past the exit to pit road. Talladega is the longest NASCAR oval with a length of 2.66-mile-long (4.28 km) tri-oval like the Daytona International Speedway, which also is a 2.5-mile-long (4 km) tri-oval.

=== Entry list ===
- (R) denotes rookie driver.
- (W) denotes driver in the Winston No Bull 5.

#	Driver	Team	Make
00	Buckshot Jones	Stavola Brothers Racing	Chevrolet
1	Steve Park (R)	Dale Earnhardt, Inc.	Chevrolet
2	Rusty Wallace	Penske-Kranefuss Racing	Ford
3	Dale Earnhardt (W)	Richard Childress Racing	Chevrolet
4	Bobby Hamilton	Morgan–McClure Motorsports	Chevrolet
5	Terry Labonte	Hendrick Motorsports	Chevrolet
6	Mark Martin	Roush Racing	Ford
7	Geoff Bodine	Mattei Motorsports	Ford
07	Dan Pardus	Midwest Transit Racing	Chevrolet
9	Jerry Nadeau (R)	Melling Racing	Ford
10	Ricky Rudd	Rudd Performance Motorsports	Ford
11	Brett Bodine	Brett Bodine Racing	Ford
12	Jeremy Mayfield (W)	Penske-Kranefuss Racing	Ford
13	Ted Musgrave	Elliott-Marino Racing	Ford
16	Kevin Lepage (R)	Roush Racing	Ford
18	Bobby Labonte	Joe Gibbs Racing	Pontiac
21	Michael Waltrip	Wood Brothers Racing	Ford
22	Ward Burton	Bill Davis Racing	Pontiac
23	Jimmy Spencer	Travis Carter Enterprises	Ford
24	Jeff Gordon (W)	Hendrick Motorsports	Chevrolet
26	Johnny Benson Jr.	Roush Racing	Ford
28	Kenny Irwin Jr. (R)	Robert Yates Racing	Ford
30	Derrike Cope	Bahari Racing	Pontiac
31	Mike Skinner	Richard Childress Racing	Chevrolet
33	Ken Schrader	Andy Petree Racing	Chevrolet
35	Darrell Waltrip	Tyler Jet Motorsports	Pontiac
36	Ernie Irvan	MB2 Motorsports	Pontiac
40	Sterling Marlin	Team SABCO	Chevrolet
41	Rick Wilson	Larry Hedrick Motorsports	Chevrolet
42	Joe Nemechek	Team SABCO	Chevrolet
43	John Andretti	Petty Enterprises	Pontiac
44	Kyle Petty	Petty Enterprises	Pontiac
46	Jeff Green	Team SABCO	Chevrolet
47	Billy Standridge	Standridge Motorsports	Ford
50	Wally Dallenbach Jr.	Hendrick Motorsports	Chevrolet
54	Bobby Gerhart	Bobby Gerhart Racing	Chevrolet
71	Dave Marcis	Marcis Auto Racing	Chevrolet
75	Rick Mast	Butch Mock Motorsports	Ford
77	Robert Pressley	Jasper Motorsports	Ford
78	Gary Bradberry	Triad Motorsports	Ford
81	Kenny Wallace	FILMAR Racing	Ford
88	Dale Jarrett (W)	Robert Yates Racing	Ford
90	Dick Trickle	Donlavey Racing	Ford
91	Andy Hillenburg	LJ Racing	Chevrolet
94	Bill Elliott	Elliott-Marino Racing	Ford
96	Steve Grissom	American Equipment Racing	Chevrolet
97	Chad Little	Roush Racing	Ford
98	Rich Bickle	Cale Yarborough Motorsports	Ford
99	Jeff Burton (W)	Roush Racing	Ford

== Practice ==
=== First practice ===
The first practice session was held on Friday, October 8, at 11:00 AM EST. The session would last for two hours and 30 minutes. Bobby Labonte, driving for Joe Gibbs Racing, would set the fastest time in the session, with a lap of 48.920 and an average speed of 195.748 miles per hour (315.026 km/h).

Pos.	#	Driver	Team	Make	Time	Speed
1	18	Bobby Labonte	Joe Gibbs Racing	Pontiac	48.920	195.748
2	5	Terry Labonte	Hendrick Motorsports	Chevrolet	49.032	195.301
3	12	Jeremy Mayfield (W)	Penske-Kranefuss Racing	Ford	49.157	194.804
Full first practice results

=== Final practice ===
The final practice session was held on Saturday, October 9. The session would last for one hour. Sterling Marlin, driving for Team SABCO, would set the fastest time in the session, with a lap of 48.783 and an average speed of 196.298 miles per hour (315.911 km/h).

Pos.	#	Driver	Team	Make	Time	Speed
1	40	Sterling Marlin	Team SABCO	Chevrolet	48.783	196.298
2	9	Jerry Nadeau (R)	Melling Racing	Ford	48.942	195.660
3	11	Brett Bodine	Brett Bodine Racing	Ford	48.965	195.568
Full Happy Hour practice results

== Qualifying ==
Qualifying was split into two rounds. The first round was held on Friday, October 8, at 3:30 PM EST. Each driver would have one lap to set a time. During the first round, the top 25 drivers in the round would be guaranteed a starting spot in the race. If a driver was not able to guarantee a spot in the first round, they had the option to scrub their time from the first round and try and run a faster lap time in a second round qualifying run, held on Saturday, October 9, at 10:45 AM EST. As with the first round, each driver would have one lap to set a time. On January 24, 1998, NASCAR would announce that the amount of provisionals given would be increased from last season. Positions 26-36 would be decided on time, while positions 37-43 would be based on provisionals. Six spots are awarded by the use of provisionals based on owner's points. The seventh is awarded to a past champion who has not otherwise qualified for the race. If no past champion needs the provisional, the next team in the owner points will be awarded a provisional.

Ken Schrader, driving for Andy Petree Racing, would win the pole, setting a time of 48.819 and an average speed of 196.153 miles per hour (315.678 km/h).

Six drivers would fail to qualify: Dan Pardus, Rick Mast, Rick Wilson, Rich Bickle, Bobby Gerhart, and Gary Bradberry.

=== Full qualifying results ===
Pos.	#	Driver	Team	Make	Time	Speed
1	33	Ken Schrader	Andy Petree Racing	Chevrolet	48.819	196.153
2	18	Bobby Labonte	Joe Gibbs Racing	Pontiac	48.861	195.985
3	88	Dale Jarrett (W)	Robert Yates Racing	Ford	49.100	195.031
4	5	Terry Labonte	Hendrick Motorsports	Chevrolet	49.175	194.733
5	31	Mike Skinner	Richard Childress Racing	Chevrolet	49.252	194.429
6	24	Jeff Gordon (W)	Hendrick Motorsports	Chevrolet	49.322	194.153
7	28	Kenny Irwin Jr. (R)	Robert Yates Racing	Ford	49.335	194.102
8	6	Mark Martin	Roush Racing	Ford	49.346	194.058
9	99	Jeff Burton (W)	Roush Racing	Ford	49.364	193.988
10	40	Sterling Marlin	Team SABCO	Chevrolet	49.374	193.948
11	00	Buckshot Jones	Stavola Brothers Racing	Chevrolet	49.398	193.854
12	2	Rusty Wallace	Penske-Kranefuss Racing	Ford	49.422	193.760
13	42	Joe Nemechek	Team SABCO	Chevrolet	49.435	193.709
14	3	Dale Earnhardt (W)	Richard Childress Racing	Chevrolet	49.441	193.685
15	97	Chad Little	Roush Racing	Ford	49.490	193.494
16	11	Brett Bodine	Brett Bodine Racing	Ford	49.498	193.462
17	10	Ricky Rudd	Rudd Performance Motorsports	Ford	49.517	193.388
18	96	Steve Grissom	American Equipment Racing	Chevrolet	49.543	193.287
19	94	Bill Elliott	Elliott-Marino Racing	Ford	49.653	192.858
20	36	Ernie Irvan	MB2 Motorsports	Pontiac	49.678	192.761
21	77	Robert Pressley	Jasper Motorsports	Ford	49.678	192.761
22	43	John Andretti	Petty Enterprises	Pontiac	49.684	192.738
23	91	Andy Hillenburg	LJ Racing	Chevrolet	49.702	192.668
24	12	Jeremy Mayfield (W)	Penske-Kranefuss Racing	Ford	49.724	192.583
25	9	Jerry Nadeau (R)	Melling Racing	Ford	49.725	192.579
26	30	Derrike Cope	Bahari Racing	Pontiac	49.565	193.201
27	13	Ted Musgrave	Elliott-Marino Racing	Ford	49.665	192.812
28	47	Billy Standridge	Standridge Motorsports	Ford	49.680	192.754
29	71	Dave Marcis	Marcis Auto Racing	Chevrolet	49.738	192.529
30	46	Jeff Green	Team SABCO	Chevrolet	49.740	192.521
31	7	Geoff Bodine	Mattei Motorsports	Ford	49.741	192.517
32	22	Ward Burton	Bill Davis Racing	Pontiac	49.807	192.262
33	26	Johnny Benson Jr.	Roush Racing	Ford	49.819	192.216
34	21	Michael Waltrip	Wood Brothers Racing	Ford	49.825	192.193
35	1	Steve Park (R)	Dale Earnhardt, Inc.	Chevrolet	49.852	192.089
36	23	Jimmy Spencer	Travis Carter Enterprises	Ford	49.872	192.012
Provisionals
37	4	Bobby Hamilton	Morgan–McClure Motorsports	Chevrolet	-*	-*
38	16	Kevin Lepage (R)	Roush Racing	Ford	-*	-*
39	50	Wally Dallenbach Jr.	Hendrick Motorsports	Chevrolet	-*	-*
40	90	Dick Trickle	Donlavey Racing	Ford	-*	-*
41	44	Kyle Petty	Petty Enterprises	Pontiac	-*	-*
42	81	Kenny Wallace	FILMAR Racing	Ford	-*	-*
Champion's Provisional
43	35	Darrell Waltrip	Tyler Jet Motorsports	Pontiac	-*	-*
Failed to qualify
44	07	Dan Pardus	Midwest Transit Racing	Chevrolet	49.907	191.877
45	75	Rick Mast	Butch Mock Motorsports	Ford	50.180	190.833
46	41	Rick Wilson	Larry Hedrick Motorsports	Chevrolet	50.197	190.768
47	98	Rich Bickle	Cale Yarborough Motorsports	Ford	50.224	190.666
48	54	Bobby Gerhart	Bobby Gerhart Racing	Chevrolet	51.247	186.860
49	78	Gary Bradberry	Triad Motorsports	Ford	51.487	185.989
Official qualifying results

== Race results ==
Fin	St	#	Driver	Team	Make	Laps	Led	Status	Pts	Winnings
1	3	88	Dale Jarrett (W)	Robert Yates Racing	Ford	188	16	running	180	$1,110,125
2	6	24	Jeff Gordon (W)	Hendrick Motorsports	Chevrolet	188	49	running	175	$86,245
3	4	5	Terry Labonte	Hendrick Motorsports	Chevrolet	188	8	running	170	$68,860
4	36	23	Jimmy Spencer	Travis Carter Enterprises	Ford	188	9	running	165	$69,850
5	24	12	Jeremy Mayfield (W)	Penske-Kranefuss Racing	Ford	188	1	running	160	$51,000
6	2	18	Bobby Labonte	Joe Gibbs Racing	Pontiac	188	9	running	155	$62,500
7	5	31	Mike Skinner	Richard Childress Racing	Chevrolet	188	74	running	156	$48,350
8	15	97	Chad Little	Roush Racing	Ford	188	0	running	142	$36,300
9	34	21	Michael Waltrip	Wood Brothers Racing	Ford	188	0	running	138	$41,970
10	9	99	Jeff Burton (W)	Roush Racing	Ford	188	0	running	134	$50,150
11	26	30	Derrike Cope	Bahari Racing	Pontiac	188	6	running	135	$43,930
12	29	71	Dave Marcis	Marcis Auto Racing	Chevrolet	188	0	running	127	$30,775
13	16	11	Brett Bodine	Brett Bodine Racing	Ford	188	1	running	129	$40,427
14	10	40	Sterling Marlin	Team SABCO	Chevrolet	187	1	running	126	$32,335
15	37	4	Bobby Hamilton	Morgan–McClure Motorsports	Chevrolet	187	0	running	118	$45,610
16	11	00	Buckshot Jones	Stavola Brothers Racing	Chevrolet	187	0	running	115	$28,775
17	27	13	Ted Musgrave	Elliott-Marino Racing	Ford	187	0	running	112	$28,010
18	17	10	Ricky Rudd	Rudd Performance Motorsports	Ford	187	0	running	109	$44,155
19	19	94	Bill Elliott	Elliott-Marino Racing	Ford	187	0	running	106	$38,375
20	41	44	Kyle Petty	Petty Enterprises	Pontiac	187	0	running	103	$38,985
21	22	43	John Andretti	Petty Enterprises	Pontiac	187	0	running	100	$42,155
22	23	91	Andy Hillenburg	LJ Racing	Chevrolet	186	0	running	97	$31,825
23	43	35	Darrell Waltrip	Tyler Jet Motorsports	Pontiac	185	0	running	94	$26,845
24	1	33	Ken Schrader	Andy Petree Racing	Chevrolet	185	0	running	91	$43,165
25	31	7	Geoff Bodine	Mattei Motorsports	Ford	184	0	running	88	$36,885
26	21	77	Robert Pressley	Jasper Motorsports	Ford	183	0	running	85	$29,910
27	12	2	Rusty Wallace	Penske-Kranefuss Racing	Ford	182	0	running	82	$41,290
28	28	47	Billy Standridge	Standridge Motorsports	Ford	181	0	running	79	$26,295
29	13	42	Joe Nemechek	Team SABCO	Chevrolet	180	0	running	76	$36,350
30	32	22	Ward Burton	Bill Davis Racing	Pontiac	178	2	running	78	$36,180
31	33	26	Johnny Benson Jr.	Roush Racing	Ford	177	0	running	70	$35,990
32	14	3	Dale Earnhardt (W)	Richard Childress Racing	Chevrolet	175	12	rear end	72	$40,920
33	30	46	Jeff Green	Team SABCO	Chevrolet	170	0	engine	64	$28,840
34	8	6	Mark Martin	Roush Racing	Ford	166	0	running	61	$42,595
35	38	16	Kevin Lepage (R)	Roush Racing	Ford	160	0	handling	58	$36,265
36	18	96	Steve Grissom	American Equipment Racing	Chevrolet	146	0	handling	55	$25,720
37	20	36	Ernie Irvan	MB2 Motorsports	Pontiac	134	0	crash	52	$35,206
38	40	90	Dick Trickle	Donlavey Racing	Ford	134	0	crash	49	$32,550
39	39	50	Wally Dallenbach Jr.	Hendrick Motorsports	Chevrolet	134	0	crash	46	$32,550
40	42	81	Kenny Wallace	FILMAR Racing	Ford	107	0	piston	43	$25,550
41	35	1	Steve Park (R)	Dale Earnhardt, Inc.	Chevrolet	101	0	valve spring	40	$25,550
42	25	9	Jerry Nadeau (R)	Melling Racing	Ford	99	0	engine	37	$25,550
43	7	28	Kenny Irwin Jr. (R)	Robert Yates Racing	Ford	30	0	valve spring	34	$40,550
Official race results

Previous race: 1998 UAW-GM Quality 500	NASCAR Winston Cup Series; 1998 season	Next race: 1998 Pepsi 400
