= Crown Jewel (NASCAR) =

Award

Historic and prestigious races in NASCAR are often called Crown Jewels. Most commonly these races are the Daytona 500, Coca-Cola 600, and Southern 500. NASCAR also recognizes the Brickyard 400 as a Crown Jewel. In recent years, the Bristol Night Race has been discussed as a potential crown jewel.

From 1985 to 1997, the Winston 500 at Talladega was considered a Crown Jewel because NASCAR Cup Series sponsor Winston offered a $1-million bonus to any driver who won three out of the four races in a season. Most modern sources do not consider it a Crown Jewel race.

Winning all Crown Jewel races is sometimes referred to as a Grand Slam. Nine drivers have completed a Grand Slam; Jeff Gordon and Bobby Allison have accomplished the feat three times apiece.

== History ==
In 1984, R. J. Reynolds Tobacco Company announced at the Waldorf Astoria New York during the annual year end awards banquet two new events that would define NASCAR for years to come. The first was an invitation only, "all-star" exhibition race called The Winston (now known as the NASCAR All-Star Race). The other announcement was that they were formally elevating the sport's four majors (sometimes referred to as the "crown jewels") into a formal Grand Slam with a cash prize bonus, known as the Winston Million. The long established and recognized major events were as follows:

- Daytona 500 (known as the richest race on the circuit) – held in February at Daytona International Speedway
- Winston 500 (known as the fastest race) – held in late April or early May at Talladega Superspeedway
- Coca-Cola 600 (known as the longest race) – held Memorial Day weekend at Charlotte Motor Speedway
- Southern 500 (known as the oldest superspeedway race) – held Labor Day weekend at Darlington Raceway

Prior to 1985, no driver had ever won all four races in the same season. Only once had a driver won three out of the four races: David Pearson in 1976. LeeRoy Yarbrough won Daytona, Charlotte, and Darlington in 1969, prior to the first race at Talladega Superspeedway.

=== Winston Million ===
From 1985 to 1997, R. J. Reynolds and brand sponsor Winston offered a US$1 million bonus to any driver who won three out of the four races (a "Small Slam") in a single calendar year season. If there was no million-dollar winner, a $100,000 consolation bonus would be given to the first driver to win two of the four races.

If a driver went into the Coca-Cola 600 or the Southern 500 with a chance to win the million, the race was advertised as the "Winston Million Running of the Coca-Cola 600" or the "Winston Million Running of the Southern 500". From 1994 to 1996, the program was advertised as the "Winston Select Million", as R. J. Reynolds elected to promote Winston's "Select" brand of cigarettes.

==== Initial success ====
In the Winston Million program's first year (1985), Bill Elliott captured the million-dollar bonus, and the victory thrust him into superstardom. He dominated the season-opening Daytona 500, then won the Winston 500 at an all-time NASCAR record speed. He remarkably came back from two laps down, having lost the laps due to having to pit due to a broken oil fitting, and he subsequently made the laps up under green. After suffering mechanical problems at Charlotte, Elliott captured the million dollar bonus at Darlington, taking command after Cale Yarborough lost power steering.

Elliott became known as "Million Dollar Bill" and appeared on the September 9, 1985 cover of Sports Illustrated.

==== Frustration ====
The relative ease with which Elliott had won the Winston Million led many to believe that the bonus would be awarded fairly often in subsequent seasons. This would ultimately prove untrue, as the award was difficult to win, and at times, it was difficult to even have a driver in contention to win.

- In 1989, Darrell Waltrip became the first driver since Elliott to have a chance at the Million, after he won at Daytona and Charlotte. He was never a factor at Darlington, though, hitting the notorious Turn 4 (now Turn 2) wall during the Southern 500 (a race he had not won in his career at the time). Waltrip settled for the $100,000 consolation prize.
- In 1990, Dale Earnhardt was leading the Daytona 500 on the final lap when he cut a tire and failed to win the race. He went on to win at Talladega and Darlington, meaning that he would have claimed the bonus had he held on to win at Daytona.
- In 1992, rain cut the Southern 500 short, robbing Davey Allison of a chance to clinch both the Million and the Career Grand Slam. He had been in contention much of the race, but finished fifth after a late pit stop shuffle. That race ended on fuel strategy as Waltrip stayed out on the track and was leading when rain stopped the race on lap 293. With the win, Waltrip finished off a Career Grand Slam.
- In 1996, Dale Jarrett had a chance to win the Million. He won at Daytona and Charlotte, and had finished just 0.22 seconds shy of winning at Talladega (coming in second to Sterling Marlin), but hit the wall early in the notoriously narrow Turn 3 at Darlington, which led to a 14th-place finish.

==== Final running ====
It would not be until 1997, the program's final year of existence, that the Million was won again. Jeff Gordon won the season-opening Daytona 500, but finished fifth in the Winston 500. He had to win the Coca-Cola 600 to keep his Winston Million opportunity alive, which he did. Gordon clinched the Winston Million by winning the Southern 500, holding off a hard-charging Jeff Burton on the final lap. The two cars touched coming around Turn 4 to take the white flag side-by-side, with Gordon holding on to win his third of four consecutive Southern 500 wins, a record in NASCAR majors. A Brinks truck led him around the victory lap, spewing bags of Winston play money.

==== Winston Million race winners/results (1985–1997) ====
| Season | Daytona | Talladega | Charlotte | Darlington | Notes |
|---|---|---|---|---|---|
| 1985 | Bill Elliott | Bill Elliott | Darrell Waltrip | Bill Elliott | Elliott won Winston Million |
| 1986 | Geoff Bodine | Bobby Allison | Dale Earnhardt | Tim Richmond | |
| 1987 | Bill Elliott | Davey Allison | Kyle Petty | Dale Earnhardt | |
| 1988 | Bobby Allison | Phil Parsons | Darrell Waltrip | Bill Elliott | |
| 1989 | Darrell Waltrip | Davey Allison | Darrell Waltrip | Dale Earnhardt | Waltrip won $100,000 bonus |
| 1990 | Derrike Cope | Dale Earnhardt | Rusty Wallace | Dale Earnhardt | Earnhardt won $100,000 bonus |
| 1991 | Ernie Irvan | Harry Gant | Davey Allison | Harry Gant | Gant won $100,000 bonus |
| 1992 | Davey Allison | Davey Allison | Dale Earnhardt | Darrell Waltrip | Allison won $100,000 bonus, Waltrip has Career Grand Slam |
| 1993 | Dale Jarrett | Ernie Irvan | Dale Earnhardt | Mark Martin | |
| 1994 | Sterling Marlin | Dale Earnhardt | Jeff Gordon | Bill Elliott | |
| 1995 | Sterling Marlin | Mark Martin | Bobby Labonte | Jeff Gordon | |
| 1996 | Dale Jarrett | Sterling Marlin | Dale Jarrett | Jeff Gordon | Jarrett won $100,000 bonus |
| 1997 | Jeff Gordon | Mark Martin | Jeff Gordon | Jeff Gordon | Gordon won Winston Million |

=== Winston No Bull 5 ===
In 1998, in preparations for the 50th anniversary of NASCAR, R. J. Reynolds decided to revamp and reintroduce the million dollar award program. Several factors contributed to the change. After thirteen seasons, the Winston Million had been won only twice, and several times, no driver won even two events. R. J. Reynolds, along with NASCAR, the drivers, and fans, wanted a new format for the award, which allowed it to be won more often and have more drivers involved.

The new program for 1998, titled the No Bull 5 (after a Winston marketing campaign) consisted of three legs of the original Grand Slam (Daytona 500, Coca-Cola 600, Southern 500) along with the Brickyard 400. The race at Talladega used for the program, however, was switched from the spring race to the October race. As a result, that event changed sponsorship names and became referred to as the Winston 500. The rules were as follows:

- The drivers who finished in the top 5 of a No Bull 5 race qualified themselves for the bonus at the next No Bull 5 race.
- If one of those five drivers went on to win that next No Bull 5 race, he won a $1 million bonus.
- Five fans were chosen for each No Bull 5 race, and were paired with each of the five qualified drivers. If the driver won the bonus, the lucky fan paired with him also won $1 million.

During the No Bull 5 races, the No Bull 5 eligible drivers raced with special paint jobs. The number on the roof and the rear spoiler was painted day-glow orange because many cars were painted red, and a day-glow "$" was affixed to the passenger window along with a red dot on the windshield in races prior to 2001. Other special decals were sometimes present. This allowed fans to quickly identify and follow the progress of the five eligible drivers. The only exception was the 1998 Daytona 500 where eligible drivers had silver numbers instead of the orange.

In subsequent seasons, the races chosen for the No Bull 5 program varied. The Brickyard 400 was dropped after only one year, replaced by the Las Vegas 400. Eventually the Daytona 500 was replaced with the Pepsi 400, and the Southern 500 was replaced by the fall event at Richmond.

In its five-year span, which totalled twenty-five races, 125 eligible driver spots, and 124 eligible fans (one fan qualified twice, winning neither), the million dollar bonus was won thirteen times. Jeff Gordon won it a record four times. Including his 1997 Winston Million victory, Gordon won a total of $5 million from the bonus program.

==== Winston No Bull 5 winners/results ====
The top five finishers in each race listed qualified to race for the bonus in the next No-Bull 5 race. For the first No-Bull 5 race, the 1998 Daytona 500, the top five finishers from the 1997 DieHard 500 were used.

==== Winston Million race winners/results (1998-2002) ====
| Year | Races | | | | |
|---|---|---|---|---|---|
| 1998 | Daytona 500 | Coca-Cola 600 | Brickyard 400 | Southern 500 | Winston 500 |
| 1998 | Dale Earnhardt | Jeff Gordon | Jeff Gordon | Jeff Gordon | Dale Jarrett |
| 1999 | Daytona 500 | Las Vegas 400 | Coca-Cola 600 | Southern 500 | Winston 500 |
| 1999 | Jeff Gordon | Jeff Burton | Jeff Burton | Jeff Burton | Dale Earnhardt |
| 2000 | Daytona 500 | Las Vegas 400 | Coca-Cola 600 | Richmond 400 | Winston 500 |
| 2000 | Dale Jarrett | Jeff Burton | Matt Kenseth | Jeff Gordon | Dale Earnhardt |
| 2001 | Las Vegas 400 | Coca-Cola 600 | Pepsi 400 | Richmond 400 | EA Sports 500 |
| 2001 | Jeff Gordon | Jeff Burton | Dale Earnhardt Jr | Ricky Rudd | Dale Earnhardt Jr |
| 2002 | Las Vegas 400 | Coca-Cola 600 | Pepsi 400 | Richmond 400 | EA Sports 500 |
| 2002 | Sterling Marlin | Mark Martin | Michael Waltrip | Matt Kenseth | Dale Earnhardt Jr |

=== Crown Jewel races ===
NASCAR Crown Jewel races generally include the Daytona 500, Coca-Cola 600 at Charlotte Motor Speedway, and Southern 500 at Darlington Raceway, along with the Brickyard 400, which has been considered by many to be a Crown Jewel event since its inception in 1994. Despite being included in the Winston Million, Talladega is not included as a Crown Jewel race in modern sources. Some drivers and media members consider the Bristol Night Race a fifth Crown Jewel event.

== Crown Jewel race results ==
=== Formation (1950–1984) ===
The first running of the Southern 500 at Darlington Raceway in 1950 was the first NASCAR race on a large speedway. It has become known as NASCAR's "oldest superspeedway race". The Talladega event was originally known as the Alabama 500 in 1970, becoming the Winston 500 from 1971 to 1997. It has been scheduled in April or May since its inception. With the addition of this race, it became possible to win all four majors in a season to complete a Grand Slam, although that feat has never been accomplished. The Daytona 500 and Coca-Cola 600 have held relatively constant dates since their inaugural race, with the Daytona 500 always held in February and the Coca-Cola 600 always scheduled for Memorial Day weekend.

| Season | Daytona | Talladega | Charlotte | Darlington | Notes |
|---|---|---|---|---|---|
| 1950 | Not held | Not held | Not held | Johnny Mantz | Inaugural Southern 500 |
| 1951 | Not held | Not held | Not held | Herb Thomas | |
| 1952 | Not held | Not held | Not held | Fonty Flock | |
| 1953 | Not held | Not held | Not held | Buck Baker | |
| 1954 | Not held | Not held | Not held | Herb Thomas | |
| 1955 | Not held | Not held | Not held | Herb Thomas | |
| 1956 | Not held | Not held | Not held | Curtis Turner | |
| 1957 | Not held | Not held | Not held | Speedy Thompson | |
| 1958 | Not held | Not held | Not held | Fireball Roberts | |
| 1959 | Lee Petty | Not held | Not held | Jim Reed | Inaugural Daytona 500 |
| 1960 | Junior Johnson | Not held | Joe Lee Johnson | Buck Baker | Inaugural World 600 |
| 1961 | Marvin Panch | Not held | David Pearson | Nelson Stacy | |
| 1962 | Fireball Roberts | Not held | Nelson Stacy | Larry Frank | |
| 1963 | Tiny Lund | Not held | Fred Lorenzen | Fireball Roberts | |
| 1964 | Richard Petty | Not held | Jim Paschal | Buck Baker | |
| 1965 | Fred Lorenzen | Not held | Fred Lorenzen | Ned Jarrett | |
| 1966 | Richard Petty | Not held | Marvin Panch | Darel Dieringer | |
| 1967 | Mario Andretti | Not held | Jim Paschal | Richard Petty | |
| 1968 | Cale Yarborough | Not held | Buddy Baker | Cale Yarborough | |
| 1969 | LeeRoy Yarbrough | Not held | LeeRoy Yarbrough | LeeRoy Yarbrough | Yarbrough became first driver to win three Crown Jewels in a single season |
| 1970 | Pete Hamilton | Pete Hamilton | Donnie Allison | Buddy Baker | Inaugural Alabama 500; Single-year Grand Slam became possible |
| 1971 | Richard Petty | Donnie Allison | Bobby Allison | Bobby Allison | |
| 1972 | A. J. Foyt | David Pearson | Buddy Baker | Bobby Allison | |
| 1973 | Richard Petty | David Pearson | Buddy Baker | Cale Yarborough | |
| 1974 | Richard Petty | David Pearson | David Pearson | Cale Yarborough | |
| 1975 | Benny Parsons | Buddy Baker | Richard Petty | Bobby Allison | |
| 1976 | David Pearson | Buddy Baker | David Pearson | David Pearson | Pearson became the first driver to complete a Grand Slam and second driver to win three Crown Jewel races in a season. |
| 1977 | Cale Yarborough | Darrell Waltrip | Richard Petty | David Pearson | |
| 1978 | Bobby Allison | Cale Yarborough | Darrell Waltrip | Cale Yarborough | |
| 1979 | Richard Petty | Bobby Allison | Darrell Waltrip | David Pearson | Allison completes Grand Slam |
| 1980 | Buddy Baker | Buddy Baker | Benny Parsons | Terry Labonte | Baker completes Grand Slam |
| 1981 | Richard Petty | Bobby Allison | Bobby Allison | Neil Bonnett | |
| 1982 | Bobby Allison | Darrell Waltrip | Neil Bonnett | Cale Yarborough | |
| 1983 | Cale Yarborough | Richard Petty | Neil Bonnett | Bobby Allison | Petty completes Grand Slam |
| 1984 | Cale Yarborough | Cale Yarborough | Bobby Allison | Harry Gant | |

=== Winston Million era (1985–1997) ===
The Brickyard 400 event was established in 1994, held in early August during the time between the Coca-Cola 600 and the Southern 500. It has supplanted the spring Talladega race as a Crown Jewel.

| Season | Daytona | Talladega | Charlotte | Indianapolis | Darlington | Notes |
|---|---|---|---|---|---|---|
| 1985 | Bill Elliott | Bill Elliott | Darrell Waltrip | Not held | Bill Elliott | Elliott becomes third driver to win three Crown Jewel races in a season. |
| 1986 | Geoff Bodine | Bobby Allison | Dale Earnhardt | Not held | Tim Richmond | |
| 1987 | Bill Elliott | Davey Allison | Kyle Petty | Not held | Dale Earnhardt | |
| 1988 | Bobby Allison | Phil Parsons | Darrell Waltrip | Not held | Bill Elliott | |
| 1989 | Darrell Waltrip | Davey Allison | Darrell Waltrip | Not held | Dale Earnhardt | |
| 1990 | Derrike Cope | Dale Earnhardt | Rusty Wallace | Not held | Dale Earnhardt | |
| 1991 | Ernie Irvan | Harry Gant | Davey Allison | Not held | Harry Gant | |
| 1992 | Davey Allison | Davey Allison | Dale Earnhardt | Not held | Darrell Waltrip | Waltrip completes Grand Slam |
| 1993 | Dale Jarrett | Ernie Irvan | Dale Earnhardt | Not held | Mark Martin | |
| 1994 | Sterling Marlin | | Jeff Gordon | Jeff Gordon | Bill Elliott | Inaugural Brickyard 400 |
| 1995 | Sterling Marlin | | Bobby Labonte | Dale Earnhardt | Jeff Gordon | |
| 1996 | Dale Jarrett | | Dale Jarrett | Dale Jarrett | Jeff Gordon | |
| 1997 | Jeff Gordon | | Jeff Gordon | Ricky Rudd | Jeff Gordon | Gordon completes Grand Slam and becomes fourth driver to win three Crown Jewel races in a season. |

=== Crown Jewel era (1998–present) ===
The Southern 500 was moved to November for 2004, and then to May from 2005 to 2014, then returning to Labor Day weekend in 2015. In 2020, the Brickyard 400 was held on Independence Day weekend. From 2021 to 2023, Indianapolis became a road course race. With the move, NASCAR, the media, and drivers no longer referred to the event as a Crown Jewel during the time. The Indianapolis race returned to the oval in 2024.

| Season | Daytona | Charlotte | Indianapolis | Darlington | Notes |
|---|---|---|---|---|---|
| 1998 | Dale Earnhardt | Jeff Gordon | Jeff Gordon | Jeff Gordon | Earnhardt completes Grand Slam |
| 1999 | Jeff Gordon | Jeff Burton | Dale Jarrett | Jeff Burton | |
| 2000 | Dale Jarrett | Matt Kenseth | Bobby Labonte | Bobby Labonte | |
| 2001 | Michael Waltrip | Jeff Burton | Jeff Gordon | Ward Burton | |
| 2002 | Ward Burton | Mark Martin | Bill Elliott | Jeff Gordon | |
| 2003 | Michael Waltrip | Jimmie Johnson | Kevin Harvick | Terry Labonte | |
| 2004 | Dale Earnhardt Jr. | Jimmie Johnson | Jeff Gordon | Jimmie Johnson | |
| 2005 | Jeff Gordon | Jimmie Johnson | Tony Stewart | Greg Biffle | |
| 2006 | Jimmie Johnson | Kasey Kahne | Jimmie Johnson | Greg Biffle | Johnson completes Grand Slam |
| 2007 | Kevin Harvick | Casey Mears | Tony Stewart | Jeff Gordon | |
| 2008 | Ryan Newman | Kasey Kahne | Jimmie Johnson | Kyle Busch | |
| 2009 | Matt Kenseth | David Reutimann | Jimmie Johnson | Mark Martin | |
| 2010 | Jamie McMurray | Kurt Busch | Jamie McMurray | Denny Hamlin | |
| 2011 | Trevor Bayne | Kevin Harvick | Paul Menard | Regan Smith | |
| 2012 | Matt Kenseth | Kasey Kahne | Jimmie Johnson | Jimmie Johnson | |
| 2013 | Jimmie Johnson | Kevin Harvick | Ryan Newman | Matt Kenseth | |
| 2014 | Dale Earnhardt Jr. | Jimmie Johnson | Jeff Gordon | Kevin Harvick | Harvick completes Grand Slam |
| 2015 | Joey Logano | Carl Edwards | Kyle Busch | Carl Edwards | |
| 2016 | Denny Hamlin | Martin Truex Jr. | Kyle Busch | Martin Truex Jr. | |
| 2017 | Kurt Busch | Austin Dillon | Kasey Kahne | Denny Hamlin | |
| 2018 | Austin Dillon | Kyle Busch | Brad Keselowski | Brad Keselowski | |
| 2019 | Denny Hamlin | Martin Truex Jr. | Kevin Harvick | Erik Jones | |
| 2020 | Denny Hamlin | Brad Keselowski | Kevin Harvick | Kevin Harvick | |
| 2021 | Michael McDowell | Kyle Larson | Held on Indianapolis road course | Denny Hamlin | |
| 2022 | Austin Cindric | Denny Hamlin | Held on Indianapolis road course | Erik Jones | |
| 2023 | Ricky Stenhouse Jr. | Ryan Blaney | Held on Indianapolis road course | Kyle Larson | |
| 2024 | William Byron | Christopher Bell | Kyle Larson | Chase Briscoe | |
| 2025 | William Byron | Ross Chastain | Bubba Wallace | Chase Briscoe | |
| 2026 | Tyler Reddick | Daniel Suárez | Corey Heim | Christopher Bell | |

== Crown Jewel statistics by driver ==
The table below includes drivers with at least five Crown Jewel race wins or wins in at least three different Crown Jewel races. For the purposes of this table, Crown Jewel races include the spring Talladega race prior to the adoption of the Brickyard 400 in 1994 and does not include the Bristol Night Race.

=== Career Crown Jewel wins ===
| Driver | Daytona 1959–Present | Talladega 1970–1993 | Charlotte 1960–Present | Indianapolis 1994–Present | Darlington 1950–Present | Race Wins | Grand Slams |
|---|---|---|---|---|---|---|---|
| Jeff Gordon | 3: 1997, 1999, 2005 | | 3: 1994, 1997, 1998 | 5: 1994, 1998, 2001, 2004, 2014 | 6: 1995, 1996, 1997, 1998, 2002, 2007 | 17 | 3 |
| Bobby Allison | 3: 1978, 1982, 1988 | 3: 1979, 1981, 1986 | 3: 1971, 1981, 1984 | | 4: 1971, 1972, 1975, 1983 | 13 | 3 |
| Jimmie Johnson | 2: 2006, 2013 | | 4: 2003, 2004, 2005, 2014 | 4: 2006, 2008, 2009, 2012 | 2: 2004, 2012 | 12 | 2 |
| Richard Petty | 7: 1964, 1966, 1971, 1973, 1974, 1979, 1981 | 1: 1983 | 2: 1975, 1977 | | 1: 1967 | 11 | 1 |
| Cale Yarborough | 4: 1968, 1977, 1983, 1984 | 2: 1978, 1984 | | | 5: 1968, 1973, 1974, 1978, 1982 | 11 | |
| David Pearson | 1: 1976 | 3: 1972, 1973, 1974 | 3: 1961, 1974, 1976 | | 3: 1976, 1977, 1979 | 10 | 1 |
| Dale Earnhardt | 1: 1998 | 1: 1990 | 3: 1986, 1992, 1993 | 1: 1995 | 3: 1987, 1989, 1990 | 9 | 1 |
| Darrell Waltrip | 1: 1989 | 2: 1977, 1982 | 5: 1978, 1979, 1985, 1988, 1989 | | 1: 1992 | 9 | 1 |
| Buddy Baker | 1: 1980 | 3: 1975, 1976, 1980 | 3: 1968, 1972, 1973 | | 1: 1970 | 8 | 1 |
| Kevin Harvick | 1: 2007 | | 2: 2011, 2013 | 3: 2003, 2019, 2020 | 2: 2014, 2020 | 8 | 1 |
| Bill Elliott | 2: 1985, 1987 | 1: 1985 | | 1: 2002 | 3: 1985, 1988, 1994 | 7 | |
| Denny Hamlin | 3: 2016, 2019, 2020 | | 1: 2022 | | 3: 2010, 2017, 2021 | 7 | |
| Dale Jarrett | 3: 1993, 1996, 2000 | | 1: 1996 | 2: 1996, 1999 | | 6 | |
| Kyle Busch | | | 1: 2018 | 2: 2015, 2016 | 1: 2008 | 4 | |
| Matt Kenseth | 2: 2009, 2012 | | 1: 2000 | | 1: 2013 | 4 | |
| Brad Keselowski | | | 1: 2020 | 1: 2018 | 1: 2018 | 3 | |
| Kyle Larson | | | 1: 2021 | 1: 2024 | 1: 2023 | 3 | |
| Bobby Labonte | | | 1: 1995 | 1: 2000 | 1: 2000 | 3 | |
| LeeRoy Yarbrough | 1: 1969 | | 1: 1969 | | 1: 1969 | 3 | |

== Related programs ==
=== Xfinity Series Dash 4 Cash Program ===
A similar program to the No Bull 5 occurs in the Xfinity Series, which began in 2009 under the series' Nationwide Insurance sponsorship. At a race prior to the first race in the program will be designated the top four finishers for the first race in the bonus. Those drivers in the first race in the program are eligible for a $100,000 bonus. Fans will select one of those four drivers, and a lucky fan will also win $100,000. The highest championship driver (as of 2011) finisher in the race, eligible for points in the Xfinity race, wins the bonus and automatically qualify's for the next event. The next three highest finishers eligible for points in the series also get a chance to race for the bonus at the next Dash4Cash race.

Starting in 2015, the 30th anniversary of the million dollar cash bonus, Comcast (the new sponsor of the second-tier series), announced modifications to the five-race program, including a million dollar bonus. Unlike past years where the races were typically assigned to conflicting weekends to prevent Sprint Cup drivers from participating under pre-2011 rules, the four races are Dover, the Lilly Diabetes 250 (Indianapolis), Food City 250 (Bristol), and Darlington. As usual, the top four finishers at Charlotte participate in the program starting at Dover.

The rules are the same, but Xfinity drivers will have a chance to qualify for the Dash 4 Cash at Charlotte. After that, that next four races are Dover, Indianapolis, Bristol, and Darlington. If a driver wins the first three cash prizes, and then wins outright Darlington, the driver's winnings in the bonus program will be augmented to one million dollars. The driver must claim the Dover, Indianapolis, and Bristol bonuses, finish first overall in the Darlington race, and earn the 47 (or 48 if the driver leads the most laps) points for the win at Darlington to claim the $600,000 bonus.

== See also ==
- Marlboro Million
- Triple Truck Challenge
