= 1998 UAW-GM Quality 500 =

28th race of the 1998 NASCAR Winston Cup Series

Race details
- Race 28 of 33 in the 1998 NASCAR Winston Cup Series
- The 1998 UAW-GM Quality 500 program cover, featuring Batman and the Joker as a promotional stunt with Robert Yates Racing. Artwork by NASCAR artist Sam Bass.
- Date: October 4, 1998
- Official name: 39th Annual UAW-GM Quality 500
- Location: Concord, North Carolina, Charlotte Motor Speedway
- Course: Permanent racing facility
- Course length: 1.5 miles (2.41 km)
- Distance: 334 laps, 501 mi (806.281 km)
- Average speed: 123.188 miles per hour (198.252 km/h)

Pole position
Driver	Derrike Cope	Bahari Racing
- Time: 29.721

Most laps led
Driver	Mark Martin	Roush Racing
- Laps: 215

Winner
No. 6	Mark Martin	Roush Racing

Television in the United States
- Network: TBS
- Announcers: Ken Squier, Buddy Baker, Dick Berggren

Radio in the United States
- Radio: Performance Racing Network

The 1998 UAW-GM Quality 500 was the 28th stock car race of the 1998 NASCAR Winston Cup Series season and the 39th iteration of the event. The race was held on Sunday, October 4, 1998, in Concord, North Carolina, at Charlotte Motor Speedway, a 1.5 miles (2.4 km) permanent quad-oval. The race took the scheduled 334 laps to complete. At race's end, Roush Racing driver Mark Martin would take his 29th career NASCAR Winston Cup Series victory and his seventh and final victory of the season. To fill out the podium, Bill Davis Racing driver Ward Burton and Roush Racing driver Jeff Burton would finish second and third, respectively.

== Background ==
The layout of Charlotte Motor Speedway, the venue where the race was held.

Lowe's Motor Speedway is a motorsports complex located in Concord, North Carolina, United States 13 miles from Charlotte, North Carolina. The complex features a 1.5 miles (2.4 km) quad oval track that hosts NASCAR racing including the prestigious Coca-Cola 600 on Memorial Day weekend and the NEXTEL All-Star Challenge, as well as the UAW-GM Quality 500. The speedway was built in 1959 by Bruton Smith and is considered the home track for NASCAR with many race teams located in the Charlotte area. The track is owned and operated by Speedway Motorsports (SMI) with Marcus Smith (son of Bruton Smith) as track president.

=== Entry list ===
- (R) denotes rookie driver.

#	Driver	Team	Make
1	Steve Park (R)	Dale Earnhardt, Inc.	Chevrolet
2	Rusty Wallace	Penske-Kranefuss Racing	Ford
3	Dale Earnhardt	Richard Childress Racing	Chevrolet
4	Bobby Hamilton	Morgan–McClure Motorsports	Chevrolet
5	Terry Labonte	Hendrick Motorsports	Chevrolet
6	Mark Martin	Roush Racing	Ford
7	Geoff Bodine	Mattei Motorsports	Ford
9	Jerry Nadeau (R)	Melling Racing	Ford
10	Ricky Rudd	Rudd Performance Motorsports	Ford
11	Brett Bodine	Brett Bodine Racing	Ford
12	Jeremy Mayfield	Penske-Kranefuss Racing	Ford
13	Ted Musgrave	Elliott-Marino Racing	Ford
16	Kevin Lepage (R)	Roush Racing	Ford
18	Bobby Labonte	Joe Gibbs Racing	Pontiac
19	Tony Raines	Roehrig Motorsports	Ford
21	Michael Waltrip	Wood Brothers Racing	Ford
22	Ward Burton	Bill Davis Racing	Pontiac
23	Jimmy Spencer	Travis Carter Enterprises	Ford
24	Jeff Gordon	Hendrick Motorsports	Chevrolet
26	Johnny Benson Jr.	Roush Racing	Ford
28	Kenny Irwin Jr. (R)	Robert Yates Racing	Ford
30	Derrike Cope	Bahari Racing	Pontiac
31	Mike Skinner	Richard Childress Racing	Chevrolet
33	Ken Schrader	Andy Petree Racing	Chevrolet
35	Darrell Waltrip	Tyler Jet Motorsports	Pontiac
36	Ernie Irvan	MB2 Motorsports	Pontiac
40	Sterling Marlin	Team SABCO	Chevrolet
41	David Green	Larry Hedrick Motorsports	Chevrolet
42	Joe Nemechek	Team SABCO	Chevrolet
43	John Andretti	Petty Enterprises	Pontiac
44	Kyle Petty	Petty Enterprises	Pontiac
46	Jeff Green	Team SABCO	Chevrolet
50	Wally Dallenbach Jr.	Hendrick Motorsports	Chevrolet
71	Dave Marcis	Marcis Auto Racing	Chevrolet
75	Rick Mast	Butch Mock Motorsports	Ford
77	Robert Pressley	Jasper Motorsports	Ford
78	Gary Bradberry	Triad Motorsports	Ford
80	Andy Hillenburg	Hover Motorsports	Ford
81	Kenny Wallace	FILMAR Racing	Ford
85	Randy MacDonald	Mansion Motorsports	Ford
88	Dale Jarrett	Robert Yates Racing	Ford
90	Dick Trickle	Donlavey Racing	Ford
91	Todd Bodine	LJ Racing	Chevrolet
94	Bill Elliott	Elliott-Marino Racing	Ford
96	Steve Grissom	American Equipment Racing	Chevrolet
97	Chad Little	Roush Racing	Ford
98	Rich Bickle	Cale Yarborough Motorsports	Ford
99	Jeff Burton	Roush Racing	Ford

== Practice ==
=== First practice ===
The first practice session was held on Wednesday, September 30, at 1:30 PM EST. The session would last for three hours and 30 minutes. Ernie Irvan, driving for MB2 Motorsports, would set the fastest time in the session, with a lap of 29.897 and an average speed of 180.620 miles per hour (290.680 km/h).

Pos.	#	Driver	Team	Make	Time	Speed
1	36	Ernie Irvan	MB2 Motorsports	Pontiac	29.897	180.620
2	22	Ward Burton	Bill Davis Racing	Pontiac	29.903	180.584
3	42	Joe Nemechek	Team SABCO	Chevrolet	29.904	180.578
Full first practice results

=== Second practice ===
The second practice session was held on Thursday, October 1. Jeff Burton, driving for Roush Racing, would set the fastest time in the session, with a lap of 30.517 and an average speed of 176.951 miles per hour (284.775 km/h).

Pos.	#	Driver	Team	Make	Time	Speed
1	99	Jeff Burton	Roush Racing	Ford	30.517	176.951
2	6	Mark Martin	Roush Racing	Ford	30.584	176.563
3	11	Brett Bodine	Brett Bodine Racing	Ford	30.607	176.430
Full second practice results

=== Third practice ===
The third practice session was held on Saturday, October 3, at 9:00 AM EST. The session would last for one hour. Bobby Hamilton, driving for Morgan–McClure Motorsports, would set the fastest time in the session, with a lap of 30.234 and an average speed of 178.607 miles per hour (287.440 km/h).

Pos.	#	Driver	Team	Make	Time	Speed
1	4	Bobby Hamilton	Morgan–McClure Motorsports	Chevrolet	30.234	178.607
2	31	Mike Skinner	Richard Childress Racing	Chevrolet	30.291	178.271
3	6	Mark Martin	Roush Racing	Ford	30.356	177.889
Full third practice results

=== Final practice ===
The final practice session was held Saturday, October 3. The session would last for one hour. Jeremy Mayfield, driving for Penske-Kranefuss Racing, would set the fastest time in the session, with a lap of 30.543 and an average speed of 176.800 miles per hour (284.532 km/h).

Pos.	#	Driver	Team	Make	Time	Speed
1	12	Jeremy Mayfield	Penske-Kranefuss Racing	Ford	30.543	176.800
2	6	Mark Martin	Roush Racing	Ford	30.574	176.621
3	36	Ernie Irvan	MB2 Motorsports	Pontiac	30.673	176.051
Full final practice results

== Qualifying ==
Qualifying was split into two rounds. The first round was held on Wednesday, September 30, at 7:00 PM EST. Each driver would have one lap to set a time. During the first round, the top 25 drivers in the round would be guaranteed a starting spot in the race. If a driver was not able to guarantee a spot in the first round, they had the option to scrub their time from the first round and try and run a faster lap time in a second round qualifying run, held on Thursday, October 1, at 1:30 PM EST. As with the first round, each driver would have one lap to set a time. On January 24, 1998, NASCAR would announce that the amount of provisionals given would be increased from last season. Positions 26-36 would be decided on time, while positions 37-43 would be based on provisionals. Six spots are awarded by the use of provisionals based on owner's points. The seventh is awarded to a past champion who has not otherwise qualified for the race. If no past champion needs the provisional, the next team in the owner points will be awarded a provisional.

Derrike Cope, driving for Bahari Racing. would win the pole, setting a time of 29.721 and an average speed of 181.690 miles per hour (292.402 km/h).

Five drivers would fail to qualify: Jeff Green, Tony Raines, Andy Hillenburg, Dave Marcis, and Randy MacDonald.

=== Full qualifying results ===
Pos.	#	Driver	Team	Make	Time	Speed
1	30	Derrike Cope	Bahari Racing	Pontiac	29.721	181.690
2	6	Mark Martin	Roush Racing	Ford	29.798	181.220
3	18	Bobby Labonte	Joe Gibbs Racing	Pontiac	29.807	181.165
4	36	Ernie Irvan	MB2 Motorsports	Pontiac	29.812	181.135
5	4	Bobby Hamilton	Morgan–McClure Motorsports	Chevrolet	29.858	180.856
6	2	Rusty Wallace	Penske-Kranefuss Racing	Ford	29.872	180.771
7	43	John Andretti	Petty Enterprises	Pontiac	29.914	180.517
8	91	Todd Bodine	LJ Racing	Chevrolet	29.914	180.517
9	12	Jeremy Mayfield	Penske-Kranefuss Racing	Ford	29.915	180.511
10	28	Kenny Irwin Jr. (R)	Robert Yates Racing	Ford	29.916	180.505
11	42	Joe Nemechek	Team SABCO	Chevrolet	29.920	180.481
12	9	Jerry Nadeau (R)	Melling Racing	Ford	29.938	180.373
13	22	Ward Burton	Bill Davis Racing	Pontiac	29.961	180.234
14	10	Ricky Rudd	Rudd Performance Motorsports	Ford	29.966	180.204
15	33	Ken Schrader	Andy Petree Racing	Chevrolet	29.980	180.120
16	78	Gary Bradberry	Triad Motorsports	Ford	29.990	180.060
17	88	Dale Jarrett	Robert Yates Racing	Ford	29.995	180.030
18	23	Jimmy Spencer	Travis Carter Enterprises	Ford	30.021	179.874
19	31	Mike Skinner	Richard Childress Racing	Chevrolet	30.039	179.766
20	97	Chad Little	Roush Racing	Ford	30.053	179.683
21	11	Brett Bodine	Brett Bodine Racing	Ford	30.055	179.671
22	5	Terry Labonte	Hendrick Motorsports	Chevrolet	30.094	179.438
23	41	David Green	Larry Hedrick Motorsports	Chevrolet	30.134	179.200
24	40	Sterling Marlin	Team SABCO	Chevrolet	30.135	179.194
25	50	Wally Dallenbach Jr.	Hendrick Motorsports	Chevrolet	30.146	179.128
26	24	Jeff Gordon	Hendrick Motorsports	Chevrolet	30.172	178.974
27	21	Michael Waltrip	Wood Brothers Racing	Ford	30.185	178.897
28	99	Jeff Burton	Roush Racing	Ford	30.190	178.867
29	94	Bill Elliott	Elliott-Marino Racing	Ford	30.232	178.619
30	81	Kenny Wallace	FILMAR Racing	Ford	30.248	178.524
31	96	Steve Grissom	American Equipment Racing	Chevrolet	30.249	178.518
32	16	Kevin Lepage (R)	Roush Racing	Ford	30.251	178.506
33	3	Dale Earnhardt	Richard Childress Racing	Chevrolet	30.314	178.136
34	44	Kyle Petty	Petty Enterprises	Pontiac	30.316	178.124
35	90	Dick Trickle	Donlavey Racing	Ford	30.372	177.795
36	13	Ted Musgrave	Elliott-Marino Racing	Ford	30.392	177.678
Provisionals
37	26	Johnny Benson Jr.	Roush Racing	Ford	-*	-*
38	1	Steve Park (R)	Dale Earnhardt, Inc.	Chevrolet	-*	-*
39	7	Geoff Bodine	Mattei Motorsports	Ford	-*	-*
40	77	Robert Pressley	Jasper Motorsports	Ford	-*	-*
41	75	Rick Mast	Butch Mock Motorsports	Ford	-*	-*
42	98	Rich Bickle	Cale Yarborough Motorsports	Ford	-*	-*
Champion's Provisional
43	35	Darrell Waltrip	Tyler Jet Motorsports	Pontiac	-*	-*
Failed to qualify
44	46	Jeff Green	Team SABCO	Chevrolet	30.585	176.557
45	19	Tony Raines	Roehrig Motorsports	Ford	30.609	176.419
46	80	Andy Hillenburg	Hover Motorsports	Ford	30.627	176.315
47	71	Dave Marcis	Marcis Auto Racing	Chevrolet	30.672	176.056
48	85	Randy MacDonald	Mansion Motorsports	Ford	31.778	169.929
Official qualifying results

== Race results ==
Fin	St	#	Driver	Team	Make	Laps	Led	Status	Pts	Winnings
1	2	6	Mark Martin	Roush Racing	Ford	334	215	running	185	$151,950
2	13	22	Ward Burton	Bill Davis Racing	Pontiac	334	35	running	175	$96,700
3	28	99	Jeff Burton	Roush Racing	Ford	334	0	running	165	$76,250
4	5	4	Bobby Hamilton	Morgan–McClure Motorsports	Chevrolet	334	0	running	160	$83,300
5	26	24	Jeff Gordon	Hendrick Motorsports	Chevrolet	334	47	running	160	$79,450
6	32	16	Kevin Lepage (R)	Roush Racing	Ford	334	0	running	150	$54,700
7	11	42	Joe Nemechek	Team SABCO	Chevrolet	334	0	running	146	$46,400
8	20	97	Chad Little	Roush Racing	Ford	334	0	running	142	$36,500
9	39	7	Geoff Bodine	Mattei Motorsports	Ford	334	0	running	138	$45,000
10	18	23	Jimmy Spencer	Travis Carter Enterprises	Ford	334	0	running	134	$50,600
11	29	94	Bill Elliott	Elliott-Marino Racing	Ford	334	0	running	130	$37,900
12	7	43	John Andretti	Petty Enterprises	Pontiac	334	0	running	127	$41,100
13	27	21	Michael Waltrip	Wood Brothers Racing	Ford	334	1	running	129	$35,850
14	1	30	Derrike Cope	Bahari Racing	Pontiac	334	6	running	126	$68,289
15	8	91	Todd Bodine	LJ Racing	Chevrolet	333	0	running	118	$28,300
16	30	81	Kenny Wallace	FILMAR Racing	Ford	333	0	running	115	$25,400
17	42	98	Rich Bickle	Cale Yarborough Motorsports	Ford	333	0	running	112	$30,000
18	34	44	Kyle Petty	Petty Enterprises	Pontiac	332	0	running	109	$28,800
19	21	11	Brett Bodine	Brett Bodine Racing	Ford	332	1	running	111	$28,400
20	10	28	Kenny Irwin Jr. (R)	Robert Yates Racing	Ford	326	0	running	103	$35,050
21	19	31	Mike Skinner	Richard Childress Racing	Chevrolet	321	0	running	100	$20,600
22	43	35	Darrell Waltrip	Tyler Jet Motorsports	Pontiac	319	0	running	97	$17,200
23	25	50	Wally Dallenbach Jr.	Hendrick Motorsports	Chevrolet	307	0	handling	94	$27,100
24	17	88	Dale Jarrett	Robert Yates Racing	Ford	301	0	running	91	$33,850
25	9	12	Jeremy Mayfield	Penske-Kranefuss Racing	Ford	290	0	running	88	$27,100
26	6	2	Rusty Wallace	Penske-Kranefuss Racing	Ford	282	0	running	85	$32,300
27	36	13	Ted Musgrave	Elliott-Marino Racing	Ford	279	0	engine	82	$16,500
28	37	26	Johnny Benson Jr.	Roush Racing	Ford	278	0	running	79	$26,400
29	33	3	Dale Earnhardt	Richard Childress Racing	Chevrolet	278	0	running	76	$31,300
30	24	40	Sterling Marlin	Team SABCO	Chevrolet	275	0	running	73	$18,700
31	4	36	Ernie Irvan	MB2 Motorsports	Pontiac	271	26	crash	75	$28,100
32	31	96	Steve Grissom	American Equipment Racing	Chevrolet	270	0	running	67	$16,000
33	35	90	Dick Trickle	Donlavey Racing	Ford	267	0	crash	64	$23,450
34	41	75	Rick Mast	Butch Mock Motorsports	Ford	258	0	running	61	$15,900
35	12	9	Jerry Nadeau (R)	Melling Racing	Ford	242	0	handling	58	$15,870
36	38	1	Steve Park (R)	Dale Earnhardt, Inc.	Chevrolet	237	0	running	55	$15,850
37	14	10	Ricky Rudd	Rudd Performance Motorsports	Ford	231	0	crash	52	$32,235
38	22	5	Terry Labonte	Hendrick Motorsports	Chevrolet	215	0	handling	49	$31,820
39	3	18	Bobby Labonte	Joe Gibbs Racing	Pontiac	202	3	crash	51	$39,915
40	15	33	Ken Schrader	Andy Petree Racing	Chevrolet	185	0	engine	43	$22,810
41	40	77	Robert Pressley	Jasper Motorsports	Ford	155	0	engine	40	$15,805
42	16	78	Gary Bradberry	Triad Motorsports	Ford	133	0	crash	37	$15,800
43	23	41	David Green	Larry Hedrick Motorsports	Chevrolet	68	0	crash	34	$22,795
Official race results

Previous race: 1998 NAPA Autocare 500	NASCAR Winston Cup Series; 1998 season	Next race: 1998 Winston 500
