= Ironstone Vineyards =

American winery located in California

Coordinates: 38.1206°N 120.4696°W

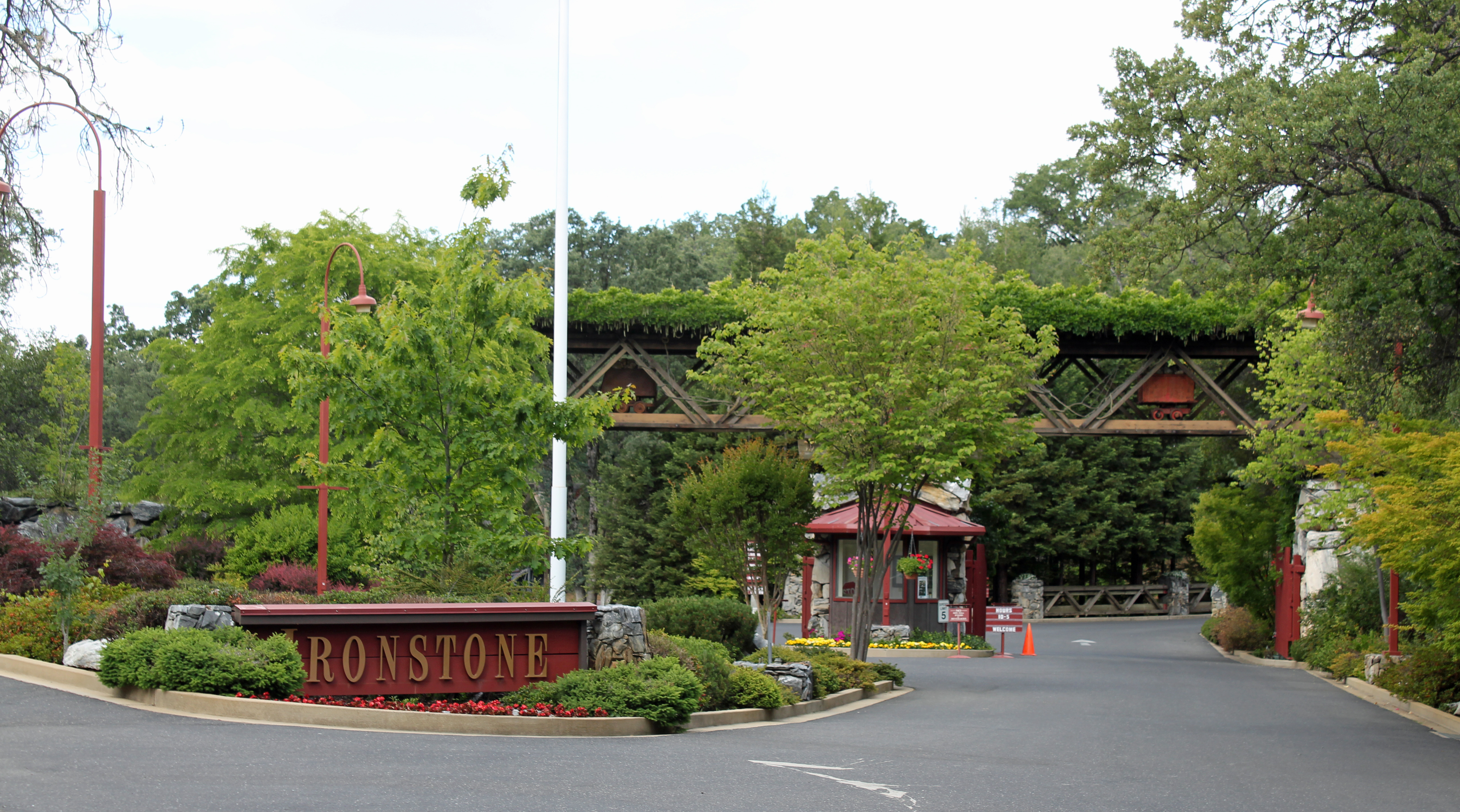
The entrance to Ironstone Vineyards in Murphys, California

Ironstone Vineyards is a winery that is noted for the production of several U.S. wine brands, including Obsession Wines, Leaping Horse Vineyards, Christine Andrew, Stone Valley, and Drifting. As of 2004, Ironstone has been listed as the 17th-largest winery (in terms of cases sold) in the United States. Ironstone also sells significant amounts of wine in international markets including the United Kingdom, Canada, and 40 other countries.

== Lodi Grape Growers ==
In addition to vineyards in the Sierra Foothills, Ironstone draws on the production from its Lodi appellation vineyards—some 7,000 acres (28 km^{2}) in all. John and Gail Kautz, founders of Ironstone, were the first to plant Chardonnay and other grape varieties in the Lodi area. The Kautz family grows numerous varieties including Cabernet Franc, Symphony, Cabernet Sauvignon, and Merlot. Ironstone Vineyards is a family-run business where apart from the husband-wife duo, John and Gail Kautz, their sons Kurt Kautz is the chief financial officer and Jack Kautz is the director.

The family's Bear Creek Winery, founded in 1934, is listed as having 8.2 million gallons of capacity, making it the 24th largest winery in the U.S. Recent capacity expansions have increased this to an estimated 12 million gallons, making it around the 20th largest winery in the U.S. Jack Kautz, who is also the founder of CrossFit Lodi, is a partner at Bear Creek Winery and is responsible for marketing the family's wines throughout the United States.

In 2015, Jack appealed to the Calaveras County Planning Commission to block the construction of the Verizon tower, a mile from the winery. In the same year, Ironstone Vineyards owners, John and Jack Kautz, donated $25,000 to The Murphys Fire Protection Service.

== Visitors' center and amphitheater ==
The Ironstone facility is located in Calaveras County, just outside Murphys, California. The seven-story building is built in the shape of a gold stamp mill. The largest specimen of crystalline gold in existence is on display in the Jewelry Shoppe. It is a 44 lbs troy (16.4 kg) gold specimen known as Ironstone's Crown Jewel.

Yearly events include the Obsession Weekend, when new wine is released, and a multi-county judged daffodil show held in March, as well as the Coucours d' Elegance car show, a fund-raiser for California youth agriculture programs held in September.

Ironstone puts on annual concerts and in the past has featured acts such as the Russian National Orchestra, Dave Koz, Robert Cray, and Michael McDonald.

== See also ==
- List of contemporary amphitheatres
