= The Jewel in the Crown =

The Jewel in the Crown may refer to:

- India's nickname during the British Raj
  - The Jewel in the Crown (novel), a 1966 novel by Paul Scott
  - The Jewel in the Crown (TV series), a 1984 television series based on the Paul Scott novel
- Jewel in the Crown (album), a 1995 album by Fairport Convention
- Jewels in the Crown: All-Star Duets with the Queen, a 2007 Aretha Franklin album
