= 2000 Chevrolet Monte Carlo 400 =

25th race of the 2000 NASCAR Winston Cup Series

Race details
- Race 25 of 34 in the 2000 NASCAR Winston Cup Series
- The 2000 Chevrolet Monte Carlo 400 program cover.
- Date: September 9, 2000
- Official name: 43rd Annual Chevrolet Monte Carlo 400
- Location: Richmond, Virginia, Richmond International Raceway
- Course: Permanent racing facility
- Course length: 0.75 miles (1.21 km)
- Distance: 400 laps, 300 mi (482.803 km)
- Average speed: 99.871 miles per hour (160.727 km/h)

Pole position
Driver	Jeff Burton	Roush Racing
- Time: 21.466

Most laps led
Driver	Jeff Burton	Roush Racing
- Laps: 152

Winner
No. 24	Jeff Gordon	Hendrick Motorsports

Television in the United States
- Network: ESPN
- Announcers: Bob Jenkins, Ned Jarrett, Benny Parsons

Radio in the United States
- Radio: Motor Racing Network

The 2000 Chevrolet Monte Carlo 400 was the 25th stock car race of the 2000 NASCAR Winston Cup Series and the 40th iteration of the event. The race was held on Saturday, September 9, 2000, in Richmond, Virginia, at Richmond International Raceway, a 0.75 miles (1.21 km) D-shaped oval. The race took the scheduled 400 laps to complete. At race's end, Jeff Gordon, driving for Hendrick Motorsports, would manage to pull away on the final restart with 15 to go to win his 52nd career NASCAR Winston Cup Series win and his third and final win of the season. To fill out the podium, Dale Earnhardt of Richard Childress Racing and Mark Martin of Roush Racing would finish second and third, respectively.

== Background ==
The layout of Richmond International Raceway, the venue where the race was at.

Richmond International Raceway (RIR) is a 3/4-mile (1.2 km), D-shaped, asphalt race track located just outside Richmond, Virginia in Henrico County. It hosts the Monster Energy NASCAR Cup Series and Xfinity Series. Known as "America's premier short track", it formerly hosted a NASCAR Camping World Truck Series race, an IndyCar Series race, and two USAC sprint car races.

=== Entry list ===
- (R) denotes rookie driver.

#	Driver	Team	Make
1	Steve Park	Dale Earnhardt, Inc.	Chevrolet
01	Ted Musgrave	Team SABCO	Chevrolet
2	Rusty Wallace	Penske-Kranefuss Racing	Ford
3	Dale Earnhardt	Richard Childress Racing	Chevrolet
4	Bobby Hamilton	Morgan–McClure Motorsports	Chevrolet
5	Terry Labonte	Hendrick Motorsports	Chevrolet
6	Mark Martin	Roush Racing	Ford
7	Michael Waltrip	Mattei Motorsports	Chevrolet
8	Dale Earnhardt Jr. (R)	Dale Earnhardt, Inc.	Chevrolet
9	Stacy Compton (R)	Melling Racing	Ford
10	Johnny Benson Jr.	Tyler Jet Motorsports	Pontiac
11	Brett Bodine	Brett Bodine Racing	Ford
12	Jeremy Mayfield	Penske-Kranefuss Racing	Ford
13	Robby Gordon	Team Menard	Ford
14	Rick Mast	A. J. Foyt Enterprises	Pontiac
16	Kevin Lepage	Roush Racing	Ford
17	Matt Kenseth (R)	Roush Racing	Ford
18	Bobby Labonte	Joe Gibbs Racing	Pontiac
19	Casey Atwood	Evernham Motorsports	Ford
20	Tony Stewart	Joe Gibbs Racing	Pontiac
21	Elliott Sadler	Wood Brothers Racing	Ford
22	Ward Burton	Bill Davis Racing	Pontiac
24	Jeff Gordon	Hendrick Motorsports	Chevrolet
25	Jerry Nadeau	Hendrick Motorsports	Chevrolet
26	Jimmy Spencer	Haas-Carter Motorsports	Ford
27	Mike Bliss (R)	Eel River Racing	Pontiac
28	Ricky Rudd	Robert Yates Racing	Ford
31	Mike Skinner	Richard Childress Racing	Chevrolet
32	Scott Pruett (R)	PPI Motorsports	Ford
33	Joe Nemechek	Andy Petree Racing	Chevrolet
36	Ken Schrader	MB2 Motorsports	Pontiac
40	Sterling Marlin	Team SABCO	Chevrolet
43	John Andretti	Petty Enterprises	Pontiac
44	Steve Grissom	Petty Enterprises	Pontiac
50	Ricky Craven	Midwest Transit Racing	Chevrolet
55	Kenny Wallace	Andy Petree Racing	Chevrolet
60	Geoff Bodine	Joe Bessey Racing	Chevrolet
66	Darrell Waltrip	Haas-Carter Motorsports	Ford
71	Dave Marcis	Marcis Auto Racing	Chevrolet
75	Wally Dallenbach Jr.	Galaxy Motorsports	Ford
77	Robert Pressley	Jasper Motorsports	Ford
88	Dale Jarrett	Robert Yates Racing	Ford
90	Hut Stricklin	Donlavey Racing	Ford
93	Dave Blaney (R)	Bill Davis Racing	Pontiac
94	Bill Elliott	Bill Elliott Racing	Ford
97	Chad Little	Roush Racing	Ford
99	Jeff Burton	Roush Racing	Ford
Official entry list

== Practice ==
=== First practice ===
The first practice session was held on Friday, September 8, at 12:30 PM EST. The session would last for one hours and 25 minutes. Rusty Wallace of Penske-Kranefuss Racing would set the fastest time in the session, with a lap of 21.656 and an average speed of 124.676 mph (200.647 km/h).

Pos.	#	Driver	Team	Make	Time	Speed
1	2	Rusty Wallace	Penske-Kranefuss Racing	Ford	21.656	124.676
2	26	Jimmy Spencer	Haas-Carter Motorsports	Ford	21.670	124.596
3	12	Jeremy Mayfield	Penske-Kranefuss Racing	Ford	21.711	124.360
Full first practice results

=== Second practice ===
The second practice session was held on Friday, September 8, at 3:00 PM EST. The session would last for one hour and 30 minutes. Bobby Labonte of Joe Gibbs Racing would set the fastest time in the session, with a lap of 21.545 and an average speed of 125.319 mph (201.681 km/h).

Pos.	#	Driver	Team	Make	Time	Speed
1	18	Bobby Labonte	Joe Gibbs Racing	Pontiac	21.545	125.319
2	10	Johnny Benson Jr.	Tyler Jet Motorsports	Pontiac	21.644	124.745
3	20	Tony Stewart	Joe Gibbs Racing	Pontiac	21.668	124.607
Full second practice results

=== Third practice ===
The third practice session was held on Saturday, September 9, at 11:30 AM EST. The session would last for one hour. Jeff Gordon of Hendrick Motorsports would set the fastest time in the session, with a lap of 21.545 and an average speed of 125.319 mph (201.681 km/h).

Pos.	#	Driver	Team	Make	Time	Speed
1	24	Jeff Gordon	Hendrick Motorsports	Chevrolet	22.289	121.135
2	27	Mike Bliss (R)	Eel River Racing	Pontiac	22.337	120.875
3	21	Elliott Sadler	Wood Brothers Racing	Ford	22.347	120.821
Full third practice results

=== Fourth and final practice ===
The final practice session, sometimes referred to as Happy Hour, was held after second-round qualifying. The session would last until 2:20 PM EST. Jeremy Mayfield of Penske-Kranefuss Racing would set the fastest time in the session, with a lap of 22.220 and an average speed of 121.512 mph (195.555 km/h).

Pos.	#	Driver	Team	Make	Time	Speed
1	12	Jeremy Mayfield	Penske-Kranefuss Racing	Ford	22.220	121.512
2	50	Ricky Craven	Midwest Transit Racing	Chevrolet	22.234	121.435
3	60	Geoff Bodine	Joe Bessey Racing	Chevrolet	22.259	121.299
Full Happy Hour practice results

== Qualifying ==
Qualifying was split into two rounds. The first round was held on Friday, September 8, at 5:30 PM EST. Each driver would have two laps to set a fastest time; the fastest of the two would count as their official qualifying lap. During the first round, the top 25 drivers in the round would be guaranteed a starting spot in the race. If a driver was not able to guarantee a spot in the first round, they had the option to scrub their time from the first round and try and run a faster lap time in a second round qualifying run, held on Saturday, September 9, at 1:15 PM EST. As with the first round, each driver would have two laps to set a fastest time; the fastest of the two would count as their official qualifying lap. Positions 26-36 would be decided on time, while positions 37-43 would be based on provisionals. Six spots are awarded by the use of provisionals based on owner's points. The seventh is awarded to a past champion who has not otherwise qualified for the race. If no past champion needs the provisional, the next team in the owner points will be awarded a provisional.

Jeff Burton of Roush Racing would win the pole, setting a time of 21.466 and an average speed of 125.780 miles per hour (202.423 km/h).

Four drivers would fail to qualify: Mike Bliss, Robby Gordon, Darrell Waltrip, and Dave Marcis.

=== Full qualifying results ===
Pos.	#	Driver	Team	Make	Time	Speed
1	99	Jeff Burton	Roush Racing	Ford	21.466	125.780
2	18	Bobby Labonte	Joe Gibbs Racing	Pontiac	21.489	125.646
3	25	Jerry Nadeau	Hendrick Motorsports	Chevrolet	21.493	125.622
4	14	Rick Mast	A. J. Foyt Enterprises	Pontiac	21.516	125.488
5	2	Rusty Wallace	Penske-Kranefuss Racing	Ford	21.526	125.430
6	22	Ward Burton	Bill Davis Racing	Pontiac	21.599	125.006
7	94	Bill Elliott	Bill Elliott Racing	Ford	21.610	124.942
8	10	Johnny Benson Jr.	Tyler Jet Motorsports	Pontiac	21.619	124.890
9	36	Ken Schrader	MB2 Motorsports	Pontiac	21.621	124.879
10	6	Mark Martin	Roush Racing	Ford	21.646	124.734
11	55	Kenny Wallace	Andy Petree Racing	Chevrolet	21.655	124.683
12	1	Steve Park	Dale Earnhardt, Inc.	Chevrolet	21.658	124.665
13	24	Jeff Gordon	Hendrick Motorsports	Chevrolet	21.661	124.648
14	20	Tony Stewart (R)	Joe Gibbs Racing	Pontiac	21.663	124.636
15	16	Kevin Lepage	Roush Racing	Ford	21.670	124.596
16	21	Elliott Sadler	Wood Brothers Racing	Ford	21.690	124.481
17	88	Dale Jarrett	Robert Yates Racing	Ford	21.697	124.441
18	12	Jeremy Mayfield	Penske-Kranefuss Racing	Ford	21.699	124.430
19	26	Jimmy Spencer	Haas-Carter Motorsports	Ford	21.701	124.418
20	17	Matt Kenseth (R)	Roush Racing	Ford	21.709	124.372
21	11	Brett Bodine	Brett Bodine Racing	Ford	21.709	124.372
22	3	Dale Earnhardt	Richard Childress Racing	Chevrolet	21.712	124.355
23	93	Dave Blaney (R)	Bill Davis Racing	Pontiac	21.725	124.281
24	60	Geoff Bodine	Joe Bessey Racing	Chevrolet	21.733	124.235
25	50	Ricky Craven	Midwest Transit Racing	Chevrolet	21.744	124.172
26	28	Ricky Rudd	Robert Yates Racing	Ford	21.758	124.092
27	43	John Andretti	Petty Enterprises	Pontiac	21.763	124.064
28	9	Stacy Compton (R)	Melling Racing	Ford	21.782	123.956
29	33	Joe Nemechek	Andy Petree Racing	Chevrolet	21.787	123.927
30	31	Mike Skinner	Richard Childress Racing	Chevrolet	21.798	123.865
31	8	Dale Earnhardt Jr. (R)	Dale Earnhardt, Inc.	Chevrolet	21.822	123.728
32	90	Hut Stricklin	Donlavey Racing	Ford	21.845	123.598
33	4	Bobby Hamilton	Morgan–McClure Motorsports	Chevrolet	21.848	123.581
34	75	Wally Dallenbach Jr.	Galaxy Motorsports	Ford	21.850	123.570
35	19	Casey Atwood	Evernham Motorsports	Ford	21.850	123.570
36	77	Robert Pressley	Jasper Motorsports	Ford	21.861	123.508
Provisionals
37	5	Terry Labonte	Hendrick Motorsports	Chevrolet	22.204	121.600
38	40	Sterling Marlin	Team SABCO	Chevrolet	1:43.167	26.171
39	97	Chad Little	Roush Racing	Ford	22.277	121.201
40	7	Michael Waltrip	Mattei Motorsports	Chevrolet	22.080	122.283
41	01	Ted Musgrave	Team SABCO	Chevrolet	22.232	121.447
42	44	Steve Grissom	Petty Enterprises	Pontiac	22.191	121.671
43	32	Scott Pruett (R)	PPI Motorsports	Ford	22.114	122.095
Failed to qualify
44	27	Mike Bliss (R)	Eel River Racing	Pontiac	22.114	122.095
45	13	Robby Gordon	Team Menard	Ford	22.246	121.370
46	66	Darrell Waltrip	Haas-Carter Motorsports	Ford	22.280	121.185
47	71	Dave Marcis	Marcis Auto Racing	Chevrolet	22.294	121.109
Full first round qualifying results
Official starting lineup

== Race results ==
Fin	St	#	Driver	Team	Make	Laps	Led	Status	Pts	Winnings
1	13	24	Jeff Gordon	Hendrick Motorsports	Chevrolet	400	15	running	80	$130,220
2	22	3	Dale Earnhardt	Richard Childress Racing	Chevrolet	400	0	running	170	$81,190
3	10	6	Mark Martin	Roush Racing	Ford	400	0	running	165	$69,130
4	12	1	Steve Park	Dale Earnhardt, Inc.	Chevrolet	400	130	running	165	$60,610
5	1	99	Jeff Burton	Roush Racing	Ford	400	152	running	165	$79,780
6	14	20	Tony Stewart (R)	Joe Gibbs Racing	Pontiac	400	5	running	155	$55,130
7	8	10	Johnny Benson Jr.	Tyler Jet Motorsports	Pontiac	400	0	running	146	$34,730
8	6	22	Ward Burton	Bill Davis Racing	Pontiac	400	0	running	142	$50,780
9	26	28	Ricky Rudd	Robert Yates Racing	Ford	400	0	running	138	$42,580
10	3	25	Jerry Nadeau	Hendrick Motorsports	Chevrolet	400	0	running	134	$52,230
11	27	43	John Andretti	Petty Enterprises	Pontiac	400	0	running	130	$50,080
12	7	94	Bill Elliott	Bill Elliott Racing	Ford	400	0	running	127	$39,855
13	31	8	Dale Earnhardt Jr. (R)	Dale Earnhardt, Inc.	Chevrolet	399	5	running	129	$37,905
14	11	55	Kenny Wallace	Andy Petree Racing	Chevrolet	399	0	running	121	$41,005
15	2	18	Bobby Labonte	Joe Gibbs Racing	Pontiac	399	3	running	123	$49,280
16	43	32	Scott Pruett (R)	PPI Motorsports	Ford	399	0	running	115	$30,805
17	9	36	Ken Schrader	MB2 Motorsports	Pontiac	399	0	running	112	$30,105
18	23	93	Dave Blaney (R)	Bill Davis Racing	Pontiac	399	0	running	109	$25,855
19	35	19	Casey Atwood	Evernham Motorsports	Ford	398	0	running	106	$25,730
20	38	40	Sterling Marlin	Team SABCO	Chevrolet	398	1	running	108	$42,005
21	41	01	Ted Musgrave	Team SABCO	Chevrolet	398	1	running	105	$37,255
22	15	16	Kevin Lepage	Roush Racing	Ford	397	0	running	97	$37,530
23	34	75	Wally Dallenbach Jr.	Galaxy Motorsports	Ford	397	0	running	94	$28,755
24	28	9	Stacy Compton (R)	Melling Racing	Ford	397	0	running	91	$28,530
25	37	5	Terry Labonte	Hendrick Motorsports	Chevrolet	397	0	running	88	$42,880
26	25	50	Ricky Craven	Midwest Transit Racing	Chevrolet	396	0	running	85	$24,755
27	42	44	Steve Grissom	Petty Enterprises	Pontiac	395	0	running	82	$36,430
28	4	14	Rick Mast	A. J. Foyt Enterprises	Pontiac	394	0	running	79	$24,505
29	39	97	Chad Little	Roush Racing	Ford	393	0	running	76	$35,685
30	30	31	Mike Skinner	Richard Childress Racing	Chevrolet	392	0	running	73	$35,975
31	17	88	Dale Jarrett	Robert Yates Racing	Ford	382	0	running	70	$48,840
32	20	17	Matt Kenseth (R)	Roush Racing	Ford	376	0	engine	67	$35,305
33	19	26	Jimmy Spencer	Haas-Carter Motorsports	Ford	317	0	crash	64	$35,170
34	5	2	Rusty Wallace	Penske-Kranefuss Racing	Ford	313	88	engine	66	$42,110
35	21	11	Brett Bodine	Brett Bodine Racing	Ford	296	0	engine	58	$24,075
36	32	90	Hut Stricklin	Donlavey Racing	Ford	249	0	engine	55	$24,040
37	36	77	Robert Pressley	Jasper Motorsports	Ford	226	0	overheating	52	$27,005
38	33	4	Bobby Hamilton	Morgan–McClure Motorsports	Chevrolet	213	0	engine	49	$34,470
39	18	12	Jeremy Mayfield	Penske-Kranefuss Racing	Ford	172	0	engine	46	$31,910
40	29	33	Joe Nemechek	Andy Petree Racing	Chevrolet	120	0	crash	43	$31,850
41	24	60	Geoff Bodine	Joe Bessey Racing	Chevrolet	57	0	crash	40	$31,815
42	16	21	Elliott Sadler	Wood Brothers Racing	Ford	54	0	crash	37	$31,780
43	40	7	Michael Waltrip	Mattei Motorsports	Chevrolet	30	0	crash	34	$31,770
Official race results

Previous race: 2000 Pepsi Southern 500	NASCAR Winston Cup Series; 2000 season	Next race: 2000 Dura Lube 300
