= Crown jewel defense =

Business strategy

In business, when a company is threatened with takeover, the crown jewel defense is a strategy in which the target company sells off its most attractive assets to a friendly third party or spins off the valuable assets in a separate entity. Consequently, the unfriendly bidder is less attracted to the company assets. Other effects include dilution of holdings of the acquirer, making the takeover uneconomical to third parties, and adverse influence of current share prices.

== See also ==
- Economics
- Mergers and Acquisitions
- Microeconomics
- Industrial organization
