= Ironstone's Crown Jewel =

World's largest piece of crystalline gold

Ironstone's Crown Jewel

Ironstone’s Crown Jewel is the world’s largest piece of crystalline gold. At 44 lbs troy (16.4 kg), it is substantially larger than the Fricot "Nugget" (13.8 lb troy; 5.15 kg) and the Whopper (11.7 lb troy; 4.37 kg), the next two largest specimens.

== History ==
Gold found in California is often in quartz, which is typically a hard rock, mined in vertical or horizontal shafts. This contrasts with placer (loose gold, often nuggets) and fine gold that has been recovered by hydraulic mining.

The gold specimen was unearthed at the Sonora Mining Corporation mine in Jamestown, California on December 24, 1992. Along with other gold-heavy quartz pieces, the gold was first believed to be bits of damaged machinery. A number of days later, the materials were examined and found to be full of gold. The “Crown Jewel” was the largest of the pieces, weighing in at 60 lb troy (22.4 kg). The finding of the gold was reported by The National Enquirer.

The find caused the Gold Trust and Reinsurance company of the West Indies to make a $20 million offer for the Sonora Mining Corporation of Toronto, Canada. The French government also offered to buy the specimen. In April 1993, Sonora Mining offered the gold specimen as a bond to Tuolumne County, California. The county ultimately declined the offer.

Many of the smaller specimens of crystalline gold were sold at a Tucson, Arizona gem show.

== Display ==
John Kautz, proprietor of Ironstone Vineyards, purchased the gold specimen in 1994 for an undisclosed price; its appraised value at the time was $3.5 million. Kautz had the 60 lb troy (22.4 kg) nugget etched with acid to remove most of the quartz; the resulting gold leaf specimen is 44 lbs troy (16.4 kg). A small piece of the original rock was left in the back to show the original matrix.

Kautz opened a museum devoted to the history of gold mining in the area, to display the gold specimen. The museum is in the same building that houses his jewelry store also opened by Kautz. California Governor George Deukmejian opened the Ironstone's Crown Jewel exhibit.

== Name ==
The name "Ironstone's Crown Jewel" comes from Kautz family's usage and promotional materials for the winery. It is the crown jewel among the historic items at the vineyard and museum.
