= 1997 NAPA 500 =

32nd race of the 1997 NASCAR Winston Cup Series

Race details
- Race 32 of 32 in the 1997 NASCAR Winston Cup Series
- The 1997 NAPA 500 program cover, with artwork by Sam Bass.
- Date: November 16, 1997
- Official name: 38th Annual NAPA 500
- Location: Hampton, Georgia, Atlanta Motor Speedway
- Course: Permanent racing facility
- Course length: 1.54 miles (2.48 km)
- Distance: 325 laps, 500.5 mi (805.476 km)
- Average speed: 159.904 miles per hour (257.341 km/h)

Pole position
Driver	Geoff Bodine	Geoff Bodine Racing
- Time: 28.074

Most laps led
Driver	Bobby Labonte	Joe Gibbs Racing
- Laps: 168

Winner
No. 18	Bobby Labonte	Joe Gibbs Racing

Television in the United States
- Network: ESPN
- Announcers: Bob Jenkins, Ned Jarrett, Benny Parsons

Radio in the United States
- Radio: PRN

The 1997 NAPA 500 was the 32nd and final stock car race of the 1997 NASCAR Winston Cup Series and the 38th iteration of the event. The race was held on Sunday, November 16, 1997, in Hampton, Georgia at Atlanta Motor Speedway, a 1.54 miles (2.48 km) permanent asphalt quad-oval intermediate speedway. The race took the scheduled 325 laps to complete. At race's end, Joe Gibbs Racing driver Bobby Labonte would manage to dominate a majority of the race to take his fifth career NASCAR Winston Cup Series victory and his only victory of the season. To fill out the top three, Robert Yates Racing driver Dale Jarrett and Roush Racing driver Mark Martin would finish second and third, respectively.

Needing an 18th-place finish or higher in the race, Hendrick Motorsports driver Jeff Gordon would manage to lock up the championship after staying consistently within the top 18, eventually securing a 17th-place finish to win his second career NASCAR Winston Cup Series championship, finishing 14 points ahead of runner-up Dale Jarrett.

== Background ==
The layout of Atlanta Motor Speedway, the circuit where the race was held.

Atlanta Motor Speedway (formerly Atlanta International Raceway) is a 1.54-mile race track in Hampton, Georgia, United States, 20 miles (32 km) south of Atlanta. It has annually hosted NASCAR Winston Cup Series stock car races since its inauguration in 1960.

The venue was bought by Speedway Motorsports in 1990. In 1994, 46 condominiums were built over the northeastern side of the track. In 1997, to standardize the track with Speedway Motorsports' other two intermediate ovals, the entire track was almost completely rebuilt. The frontstretch and backstretch were swapped, and the configuration of the track was changed from oval to quad-oval, with a new official length of 1.54-mile (2.48 km) where before it was 1.522-mile (2.449 km). The project made the track one of the fastest on the NASCAR circuit.

=== Entry list ===
- (R) - denotes rookie driver.

#	Driver	Team	Make
00	Buckshot Jones	Buckshot Racing	Pontiac
1	Morgan Shepherd	Precision Products Racing	Pontiac
2	Rusty Wallace	Penske Racing South	Ford
3	Dale Earnhardt	Richard Childress Racing	Chevrolet
4	Sterling Marlin	Morgan–McClure Motorsports	Chevrolet
5	Terry Labonte	Hendrick Motorsports	Chevrolet
6	Mark Martin	Roush Racing	Ford
7	Geoff Bodine	Geoff Bodine Racing	Ford
8	Hut Stricklin	Stavola Brothers Racing	Ford
9	Lake Speed	Melling Racing	Ford
10	Ricky Rudd	Rudd Performance Motorsports	Ford
11	Brett Bodine	Brett Bodine Racing	Ford
14	Steve Park	Dale Earnhardt, Inc.	Chevrolet
16	Ted Musgrave	Roush Racing	Ford
17	Darrell Waltrip	Darrell Waltrip Motorsports	Chevrolet
18	Bobby Labonte	Joe Gibbs Racing	Pontiac
21	Michael Waltrip	Wood Brothers Racing	Ford
22	Ward Burton	Bill Davis Racing	Pontiac
23	Jimmy Spencer	Haas-Carter Motorsports	Ford
24	Jeff Gordon	Hendrick Motorsports	Chevrolet
25	Ricky Craven	Hendrick Motorsports	Chevrolet
27	Kenny Irwin Jr.	David Blair Motorsports	Ford
28	Ernie Irvan	Robert Yates Racing	Ford
29	Jeff Green (R)	Diamond Ridge Motorsports	Chevrolet
30	Johnny Benson Jr.	Bahari Racing	Pontiac
31	Mike Skinner (R)	Richard Childress Racing	Chevrolet
33	Ken Schrader	Andy Petree Racing	Chevrolet
35	Todd Bodine	ISM Racing	Pontiac
36	Derrike Cope	MB2 Motorsports	Pontiac
37	Jeremy Mayfield	Kranefuss-Haas Racing	Ford
40	Greg Sacks	Team SABCO	Chevrolet
41	Steve Grissom	Larry Hedrick Motorsports	Chevrolet
42	Joe Nemechek	Team SABCO	Chevrolet
43	Bobby Hamilton	Petty Enterprises	Pontiac
44	Kyle Petty	Petty Enterprises	Pontiac
46	Wally Dallenbach Jr.	Team SABCO	Chevrolet
71	Dave Marcis	Marcis Auto Racing	Chevrolet
75	Rick Mast	Butch Mock Motorsports	Ford
77	Robert Pressley	Jasper Motorsports	Ford
78	Gary Bradberry	Triad Motorsports	Ford
81	Kenny Wallace	FILMAR Racing	Ford
88	Dale Jarrett	Robert Yates Racing	Ford
90	Dick Trickle	Donlavey Racing	Ford
91	Kevin Lepage	LJ Racing	Chevrolet
94	Bill Elliott	Bill Elliott Racing	Ford
95	Ed Berrier	Sadler Brothers Racing	Chevrolet
96	David Green (R)	American Equipment Racing	Chevrolet
97	Chad Little	Roush Racing	Pontiac
98	John Andretti	Cale Yarborough Motorsports	Ford
99	Jeff Burton	Roush Racing	Ford

== Qualifying ==
Qualifying was scheduled to be split into two rounds. If the events had run as scheduled, the first round was scheduled to be held on Friday, November 14, at 3:00 PM EST. Each driver would have one lap to set a time. During the first round, the top 25 drivers in the round would be guaranteed a starting spot in the race. If a driver was not able to guarantee a spot in the first round, they had the option to scrub their time from the first round and try and run a faster lap time in a second round qualifying run, which was scheduled to be held on Saturday, November 15, at 11:00 AM EST. As with the first round, each driver would have one lap to set a time. Positions 26-38 would be decided on time, and depending on who needed it, the 39th thru either the 42nd, 43rd, or 44th position would be based on provisionals. Four spots are awarded by the use of provisionals based on owner's points. The fifth is awarded to a past champion who has not otherwise qualified for the race. If no past champion needs the provisional, the field would be limited to 42 cars. If a champion needed it, the field would expand to 43 cars. If the race was a companion race with the NASCAR Winston West Series, four spots would be determined by NASCAR Winston Cup Series provisionals, while the final two spots would be given to teams in the Winston West Series, leaving the field at 44 cars.

The first round of qualifying was postponed until Saturday, November 15 due to rain. This would leave only one round of qualifying ran, cancelling the second round.

Geoff Bodine, driving for Geoff Bodine Racing, would win the pole, setting a time of 28.074 and an average speed of 197.478 miles per hour (317.810 km/h).

Seven drivers would fail to qualify: Todd Bodine, Robert Pressley, David Green, Hut Stricklin, Greg Sacks, Ed Berrier, and Dave Marcis.

=== Full qualifying results ===
Pos.	#	Driver	Team	Make	Time	Speed
1	7	Geoff Bodine	Geoff Bodine Racing	Ford	28.074	197.478
2	22	Ward Burton	Bill Davis Racing	Pontiac	28.365	195.452
3	88	Dale Jarrett	Robert Yates Racing	Ford	28.414	195.115
4	5	Terry Labonte	Hendrick Motorsports	Chevrolet	28.420	195.074
5	42	Joe Nemechek	Team SABCO	Chevrolet	28.428	195.019
6	3	Dale Earnhardt	Richard Childress Racing	Chevrolet	28.498	194.540
7	29	Jeff Green (R)	Diamond Ridge Motorsports	Chevrolet	28.515	194.424
8	27	Kenny Irwin Jr.	David Blair Motorsports	Ford	28.519	194.397
9	6	Mark Martin	Roush Racing	Ford	28.566	194.077
10	94	Bill Elliott	Bill Elliott Racing	Ford	28.613	193.758
11	10	Ricky Rudd	Rudd Performance Motorsports	Ford	28.628	193.657
12	30	Johnny Benson Jr.	Bahari Racing	Pontiac	28.646	193.535
13	33	Ken Schrader	Andy Petree Racing	Chevrolet	28.666	193.400
14	36	Derrike Cope	MB2 Motorsports	Pontiac	28.692	193.225
15	41	Steve Grissom	Larry Hedrick Motorsports	Chevrolet	28.698	193.184
16	75	Rick Mast	Butch Mock Motorsports	Ford	28.709	193.110
17	78	Gary Bradberry	Triad Motorsports	Ford	28.724	193.009
18	11	Brett Bodine	Brett Bodine Racing	Ford	28.729	192.976
19	81	Kenny Wallace	FILMAR Racing	Ford	28.737	192.922
20	44	Kyle Petty	Petty Enterprises	Pontiac	28.748	192.848
21	18	Bobby Labonte	Joe Gibbs Racing	Pontiac	28.776	192.661
22	90	Dick Trickle	Donlavey Racing	Ford	28.779	192.640
23	28	Ernie Irvan	Robert Yates Racing	Ford	28.792	192.553
24	97	Chad Little	Roush Racing	Pontiac	28.801	192.493
25	14	Steve Park	Dale Earnhardt, Inc.	Chevrolet	28.825	192.333
26	91	Kevin Lepage	LJ Racing	Chevrolet	28.858	192.113
27	4	Sterling Marlin	Morgan–McClure Motorsports	Chevrolet	28.861	192.093
28	31	Mike Skinner (R)	Richard Childress Racing	Chevrolet	28.868	192.047
29	9	Lake Speed	Melling Racing	Ford	28.895	191.867
30	46	Wally Dallenbach Jr.	Team SABCO	Chevrolet	28.903	191.814
31	98	John Andretti	Cale Yarborough Motorsports	Ford	28.913	191.748
32	00	Buckshot Jones	Buckshot Racing	Pontiac	28.989	191.245
33	2	Rusty Wallace	Penske Racing South	Ford	28.995	191.205
34	16	Ted Musgrave	Roush Racing	Ford	29.018	191.054
35	21	Michael Waltrip	Wood Brothers Racing	Ford	29.029	190.981
36	1	Morgan Shepherd	Precision Products Racing	Pontiac	29.043	190.889
37	24	Jeff Gordon	Hendrick Motorsports	Chevrolet	29.076	190.673
38	37	Jeremy Mayfield	Kranefuss-Haas Racing	Ford	29.086	190.607
Provisionals
39	99	Jeff Burton	Roush Racing	Ford	-*	-*
40	43	Bobby Hamilton	Petty Enterprises	Pontiac	-*	-*
41	25	Ricky Craven	Hendrick Motorsports	Chevrolet	-*	-*
42	23	Jimmy Spencer	Travis Carter Enterprises	Ford	-*	-*
Champion's Provisionals
43	17	Darrell Waltrip	Darrell Waltrip Motorsports	Chevrolet	-*	-*
Failed to qualify
44	35	Todd Bodine	ISM Racing	Pontiac	-*	-*
45	77	Robert Pressley	Jasper Motorsports	Ford	-*	-*
46	96	David Green (R)	American Equipment Racing	Chevrolet	-*	-*
47	8	Hut Stricklin	Stavola Brothers Racing	Ford	-*	-*
48	40	Greg Sacks	Team SABCO	Chevrolet	-*	-*
49	95	Ed Berrier	Sadler Brothers Racing	Chevrolet	-*	-*
50	71	Dave Marcis	Marcis Auto Racing	Chevrolet	-*	-*
Official qualifying results

*Time not available.

== Race results ==
Fin	St	#	Driver	Team	Make	Laps	Led	Status	Pts	Winnings
1	21	18	Bobby Labonte	Joe Gibbs Racing	Pontiac	325	168	running	185	$158,600
2	3	88	Dale Jarrett	Robert Yates Racing	Ford	325	5	running	175	$79,600
3	9	6	Mark Martin	Roush Racing	Ford	325	52	running	170	$60,300
4	7	29	Jeff Green (R)	Diamond Ridge Motorsports	Chevrolet	325	0	running	160	$43,475
5	14	36	Derrike Cope	MB2 Motorsports	Pontiac	325	2	running	160	$38,100
6	20	44	Kyle Petty	Petty Enterprises	Pontiac	324	5	running	155	$34,075
7	40	43	Bobby Hamilton	Petty Enterprises	Pontiac	324	0	running	146	$43,030
8	5	42	Joe Nemechek	Team SABCO	Chevrolet	324	41	running	147	$35,950
9	2	22	Ward Burton	Bill Davis Racing	Pontiac	323	13	running	143	$39,425
10	12	30	Johnny Benson Jr.	Bahari Racing	Pontiac	323	0	running	134	$38,950
11	27	4	Sterling Marlin	Morgan–McClure Motorsports	Chevrolet	323	0	running	130	$41,975
12	23	28	Ernie Irvan	Robert Yates Racing	Ford	323	4	running	132	$41,050
13	35	21	Michael Waltrip	Wood Brothers Racing	Ford	322	0	running	124	$38,425
14	22	90	Dick Trickle	Donlavey Racing	Ford	322	0	running	121	$28,975
15	25	14	Steve Park	Dale Earnhardt, Inc.	Chevrolet	322	0	running	118	$25,650
16	6	3	Dale Earnhardt	Richard Childress Racing	Chevrolet	322	24	running	120	$43,075
17	37	24	Jeff Gordon	Hendrick Motorsports	Chevrolet	322	0	running	112	$41,155
18	24	97	Chad Little	Roush Racing	Pontiac	321	7	running	114	$27,440
19	38	37	Jeremy Mayfield	Kranefuss-Haas Racing	Ford	321	0	running	106	$27,100
20	13	33	Ken Schrader	Andy Petree Racing	Chevrolet	321	0	running	103	$33,685
21	4	5	Terry Labonte	Hendrick Motorsports	Chevrolet	321	0	running	100	$44,470
22	31	98	John Andretti	Cale Yarborough Motorsports	Ford	320	0	running	97	$33,055
23	28	31	Mike Skinner (R)	Richard Childress Racing	Chevrolet	320	0	running	94	$25,740
24	42	23	Jimmy Spencer	Travis Carter Enterprises	Ford	320	0	running	91	$32,425
25	8	27	Kenny Irwin Jr.	David Blair Motorsports	Ford	320	0	running	88	$21,910
26	29	9	Lake Speed	Melling Racing	Ford	317	0	running	85	$24,995
27	36	1	Morgan Shepherd	Precision Products Racing	Pontiac	317	0	running	82	$31,780
28	15	41	Steve Grissom	Larry Hedrick Motorsports	Chevrolet	317	0	running	79	$31,565
29	26	91	Kevin Lepage	LJ Racing	Chevrolet	317	0	running	76	$21,505
30	19	81	Kenny Wallace	FILMAR Racing	Ford	317	0	running	73	$31,430
31	34	16	Ted Musgrave	Roush Racing	Ford	315	0	running	70	$30,865
32	33	2	Rusty Wallace	Penske Racing South	Ford	314	0	running	67	$38,300
33	1	7	Geoff Bodine	Geoff Bodine Racing	Ford	314	4	running	69	$43,735
34	39	99	Jeff Burton	Roush Racing	Ford	313	0	running	61	$36,170
35	16	75	Rick Mast	Butch Mock Motorsports	Ford	302	0	running	58	$28,105
36	10	94	Bill Elliott	Bill Elliott Racing	Ford	274	0	clutch	55	$28,040
37	11	10	Ricky Rudd	Rudd Performance Motorsports	Ford	242	0	handling	52	$36,030
38	30	46	Wally Dallenbach Jr.	Team SABCO	Chevrolet	231	0	running	49	$20,875
39	41	25	Ricky Craven	Hendrick Motorsports	Chevrolet	173	0	handling	46	$27,875
40	43	17	Darrell Waltrip	Darrell Waltrip Motorsports	Chevrolet	114	0	ignition	43	$27,875
41	18	11	Brett Bodine	Brett Bodine Racing	Ford	57	0	handling	40	$29,375
42	17	78	Gary Bradberry	Triad Motorsports	Ford	50	0	crash	37	$20,875
43	32	00	Buckshot Jones	Buckshot Racing	Pontiac	38	0	crash	34	$20,875
Failed to qualify
44		35	Todd Bodine	ISM Racing	Pontiac					
45		77	Robert Pressley	Jasper Motorsports	Ford					
46		96	David Green (R)	American Equipment Racing	Chevrolet					
47		8	Hut Stricklin	Stavola Brothers Racing	Ford					
48		40	Greg Sacks	Team SABCO	Chevrolet					
49		95	Ed Berrier	Sadler Brothers Racing	Chevrolet					
50		71	Dave Marcis	Marcis Auto Racing	Chevrolet					
Official race results

Previous race: 1997 Dura Lube 500	NASCAR Winston Cup Series; 1997 season	Next race: 1998 Daytona 500
