= 1997 AC Delco 400 =

30th race of the 1997 NASCAR Winston Cup Series

Race details
- Race 30 of 32 in the 1997 NASCAR Winston Cup Series
- The 1997 AC Delco 400 program cover
- Date: October 27, 1997
- Official name: 33rd Annual AC Delco 400
- Location: Rockingham, North Carolina, North Carolina Speedway
- Course: Permanent racing facility
- Course length: 1.017 miles (1.636 km)
- Distance: 393 laps, 399.681 mi (643.224 km)
- Average speed: 121.73 miles per hour (195.91 km/h)

Pole position
Driver	Bobby Labonte	Joe Gibbs Racing
- Time: 23.365

Most laps led
Driver	Ricky Craven	Hendrick Motorsports
- Laps: 139

Winner
No. 43	Bobby Hamilton	Petty Enterprises

Television in the United States
- Network: TNN
- Announcers: Eli Gold, Buddy Baker, Dick Berggren

Radio in the United States
- Radio: Motor Racing Network

The 1997 AC Delco 400 was the 30th stock car race of the 1997 NASCAR Winston Cup Series and the 33rd iteration of the event. The race was originally scheduled to be held on Sunday, October 26, 1997, but was postponed to Monday, October 27, due to rain. The race was held in Rockingham, North Carolina, at North Carolina Speedway, a 1.017 miles (1.637 km) permanent high-banked racetrack. The race took the scheduled 393 laps to complete. In the final laps of the race, Petty Enterprises driver Bobby Hamilton would manage to make a late-race charge to lead to take his second career NASCAR Winston Cup Series victory and his only victory of the season. To fill out the top three, Robert Yates Racing driver Dale Jarrett and Hendrick Motorsports driver Ricky Craven would finish second and third, respectively.

== Background ==
The layout of North Carolina Speedway, the venue where the race was held.

North Carolina Speedway was opened as a flat, one-mile oval on October 31, 1965. In 1969, the track was extensively reconfigured to a high-banked, D-shaped oval just over one mile in length. In 1997, North Carolina Motor Speedway merged with Penske Motorsports, and was renamed North Carolina Speedway. Shortly thereafter, the infield was reconfigured, and competition on the infield road course, mostly by the SCCA, was discontinued. Currently, the track is home to the Fast Track High Performance Driving School.

=== Entry list ===
- (R) denotes rookie driver.

#	Driver	Team	Make
1	Morgan Shepherd	Precision Products Racing	Pontiac
2	Rusty Wallace	Penske Racing South	Ford
3	Dale Earnhardt	Richard Childress Racing	Chevrolet
4	Sterling Marlin	Morgan–McClure Motorsports	Chevrolet
5	Terry Labonte	Hendrick Motorsports	Chevrolet
6	Mark Martin	Roush Racing	Ford
7	Geoff Bodine	Geoff Bodine Racing	Ford
8	Hut Stricklin	Stavola Brothers Racing	Ford
9	Lake Speed	Melling Racing	Ford
10	Ricky Rudd	Rudd Performance Motorsports	Ford
11	Brett Bodine	Brett Bodine Racing	Ford
14	Steve Park	Dale Earnhardt, Inc.	Chevrolet
16	Ted Musgrave	Roush Racing	Ford
17	Darrell Waltrip	Darrell Waltrip Motorsports	Chevrolet
18	Bobby Labonte	Joe Gibbs Racing	Pontiac
21	Michael Waltrip	Wood Brothers Racing	Ford
22	Ward Burton	Bill Davis Racing	Pontiac
23	Jimmy Spencer	Haas-Carter Motorsports	Ford
24	Jeff Gordon	Hendrick Motorsports	Chevrolet
25	Ricky Craven	Hendrick Motorsports	Chevrolet
27	Kenny Irwin Jr.	David Blair Motorsports	Ford
28	Ernie Irvan	Robert Yates Racing	Ford
29	Jeff Green (R)	Diamond Ridge Motorsports	Chevrolet
30	Johnny Benson Jr.	Bahari Racing	Pontiac
31	Mike Skinner (R)	Richard Childress Racing	Chevrolet
33	Ken Schrader	Andy Petree Racing	Chevrolet
36	Derrike Cope	MB2 Motorsports	Pontiac
37	Jeremy Mayfield	Kranefuss-Haas Racing	Ford
40	Greg Sacks	Team SABCO	Chevrolet
41	Steve Grissom	Larry Hedrick Motorsports	Chevrolet
42	Joe Nemechek	Team SABCO	Chevrolet
43	Bobby Hamilton	Petty Enterprises	Pontiac
44	Kyle Petty	Petty Enterprises	Pontiac
46	Wally Dallenbach Jr.	Team SABCO	Chevrolet
71	Dave Marcis	Marcis Auto Racing	Chevrolet
75	Rick Mast	Butch Mock Motorsports	Ford
77	Robert Pressley	Jasper Motorsports	Ford
78	Gary Bradberry	Triad Motorsports	Ford
81	Kenny Wallace	FILMAR Racing	Ford
88	Dale Jarrett	Robert Yates Racing	Ford
90	Dick Trickle	Donlavey Racing	Ford
94	Bill Elliott	Bill Elliott Racing	Ford
95	Ed Berrier	Sadler Brothers Racing	Chevrolet
96	David Green (R)	American Equipment Racing	Chevrolet
97	Chad Little	Roush Racing	Pontiac
98	John Andretti	Cale Yarborough Motorsports	Ford
99	Jeff Burton	Roush Racing	Ford

== Qualifying ==
Qualifying was split into two rounds. The first round was held on Friday, October 24, at 2:00 PM EST. Each driver would have one lap to set a time. During the first round, the top 25 drivers in the round would be guaranteed a starting spot in the race. If a driver was not able to guarantee a spot in the first round, they had the option to scrub their time from the first round and try and run a faster lap time in a second round qualifying run, held on Saturday, October 25, at 9:45 AM EST. As with the first round, each driver would have one lap to set a time. Positions 26-38 would be decided on time, and depending on who needed it, the 39th thru either the 42nd, 43rd, or 44th position would be based on provisionals. Four spots are awarded by the use of provisionals based on owner's points. The fifth is awarded to a past champion who has not otherwise qualified for the race. If no past champion needs the provisional, the field would be limited to 42 cars. If a champion needed it, the field would expand to 43 cars. If the race was a companion race with the NASCAR Winston West Series, four spots would be determined by NASCAR Winston Cup Series provisionals, while the final two spots would be given to teams in the Winston West Series, leaving the field at 44 cars.

Bobby Labonte, driving for Joe Gibbs Racing, would win the pole, setting a time of 23.365 and an average speed of 156.696 miles per hour (252.178 km/h).

Four drivers would fail to qualify: Brett Bodine, Dave Marcis, Ed Berrier, and Kenny Irwin Jr.

=== Full qualifying results ===
Pos.	#	Driver	Team	Make	Time	Speed
1	18	Bobby Labonte	Joe Gibbs Racing	Pontiac	23.365	156.696
2	88	Dale Jarrett	Robert Yates Racing	Ford	23.391	156.522
3	6	Mark Martin	Roush Racing	Ford	23.423	156.308
4	22	Ward Burton	Bill Davis Racing	Pontiac	23.499	155.802
5	44	Kyle Petty	Petty Enterprises	Pontiac	23.539	155.538
6	24	Jeff Gordon	Hendrick Motorsports	Chevrolet	23.541	155.524
7	7	Geoff Bodine	Geoff Bodine Racing	Ford	23.542	155.518
8	94	Bill Elliott	Bill Elliott Racing	Ford	23.548	155.478
9	25	Ricky Craven	Hendrick Motorsports	Chevrolet	23.551	155.458
10	31	Mike Skinner (R)	Richard Childress Racing	Chevrolet	23.553	155.445
11	99	Jeff Burton	Roush Racing	Ford	23.563	155.379
12	90	Dick Trickle	Donlavey Racing	Ford	23.575	155.300
13	10	Ricky Rudd	Rudd Performance Motorsports	Ford	23.585	155.234
14	36	Derrike Cope	MB2 Motorsports	Pontiac	23.589	155.208
15	96	David Green (R)	American Equipment Racing	Chevrolet	23.596	155.162
16	97	Chad Little	Roush Racing	Pontiac	23.606	155.096
17	21	Michael Waltrip	Wood Brothers Racing	Ford	23.611	155.063
18	2	Rusty Wallace	Penske Racing South	Ford	23.616	155.030
19	42	Joe Nemechek	Team SABCO	Chevrolet	23.618	155.017
20	30	Johnny Benson Jr.	Bahari Racing	Pontiac	23.621	154.998
21	46	Wally Dallenbach Jr.	Team SABCO	Chevrolet	23.621	154.998
22	75	Rick Mast	Butch Mock Motorsports	Ford	23.622	154.991
23	8	Hut Stricklin	Stavola Brothers Racing	Ford	23.642	154.860
24	37	Jeremy Mayfield	Kranefuss-Haas Racing	Ford	23.646	154.834
25	81	Kenny Wallace	FILMAR Racing	Ford	23.650	154.808
26	3	Dale Earnhardt	Richard Childress Racing	Chevrolet	23.676	154.638
27	77	Robert Pressley	Jasper Motorsports	Ford	23.683	154.592
28	43	Bobby Hamilton	Petty Enterprises	Pontiac	23.686	154.572
29	29	Jeff Green (R)	Diamond Ridge Motorsports	Chevrolet	23.697	154.501
30	9	Lake Speed	Melling Racing	Ford	23.700	154.481
31	1	Morgan Shepherd	Precision Products Racing	Pontiac	23.710	154.416
32	14	Steve Park	Dale Earnhardt, Inc.	Chevrolet	23.724	154.325
33	5	Terry Labonte	Hendrick Motorsports	Chevrolet	23.746	154.182
34	16	Ted Musgrave	Roush Racing	Ford	23.765	154.058
35	4	Sterling Marlin	Morgan–McClure Motorsports	Chevrolet	23.767	154.046
36	78	Gary Bradberry	Triad Motorsports	Ford	23.814	153.741
37	41	Steve Grissom	Larry Hedrick Motorsports	Chevrolet	23.824	153.677
38	33	Ken Schrader	Andy Petree Racing	Chevrolet	23.870	153.381
Provisionals
39	28	Ernie Irvan	Robert Yates Racing	Ford	-*	-*
40	23	Jimmy Spencer	Travis Carter Enterprises	Ford	-*	-*
41	98	John Andretti	Cale Yarborough Motorsports	Ford	-*	-*
42	40	Greg Sacks	Team SABCO	Chevrolet	-*	-*
Champion's Provisional
43	17	Darrell Waltrip	Darrell Waltrip Motorsports	Chevrolet	-*	-*
Failed to qualify
44	11	Brett Bodine	Brett Bodine Racing	Ford	-*	-*
45	71	Dave Marcis	Marcis Auto Racing	Chevrolet	-*	-*
46	95	Ed Berrier	Sadler Brothers Racing	Chevrolet	-*	-*
47	27	Kenny Irwin Jr.	David Blair Motorsports	Ford	-*	-*
Official qualifying results

*Time not available.

== Race results ==
Fin	St	#	Driver	Team	Make	Laps	Led	Status	Pts	Winnings
1	28	43	Bobby Hamilton	Petty Enterprises	Pontiac	393	37	running	180	$89,150
2	2	88	Dale Jarrett	Robert Yates Racing	Ford	393	73	running	175	$65,175
3	9	25	Ricky Craven	Hendrick Motorsports	Chevrolet	393	139	running	175	$45,625
4	6	24	Jeff Gordon	Hendrick Motorsports	Chevrolet	393	23	running	165	$41,150
5	12	90	Dick Trickle	Donlavey Racing	Ford	393	0	running	155	$30,800
6	3	6	Mark Martin	Roush Racing	Ford	393	0	running	150	$32,400
7	33	5	Terry Labonte	Hendrick Motorsports	Chevrolet	393	1	running	151	$38,400
8	26	3	Dale Earnhardt	Richard Childress Racing	Chevrolet	393	0	running	142	$32,800
9	35	4	Sterling Marlin	Morgan–McClure Motorsports	Chevrolet	393	0	running	138	$32,200
10	19	42	Joe Nemechek	Team SABCO	Chevrolet	393	0	running	134	$22,625
11	1	18	Bobby Labonte	Joe Gibbs Racing	Pontiac	392	93	running	135	$36,875
12	8	94	Bill Elliott	Bill Elliott Racing	Ford	392	0	running	127	$26,575
13	27	77	Robert Pressley	Jasper Motorsports	Ford	392	0	running	124	$14,975
14	17	21	Michael Waltrip	Wood Brothers Racing	Ford	392	0	running	121	$26,075
15	24	37	Jeremy Mayfield	Kranefuss-Haas Racing	Ford	392	0	running	118	$19,675
16	16	97	Chad Little	Roush Racing	Pontiac	391	0	running	115	$18,475
17	30	9	Lake Speed	Melling Racing	Ford	391	0	running	112	$18,175
18	18	2	Rusty Wallace	Penske Racing South	Ford	391	0	running	109	$30,975
19	7	7	Geoff Bodine	Geoff Bodine Racing	Ford	391	4	running	111	$24,575
20	14	36	Derrike Cope	MB2 Motorsports	Pontiac	391	0	running	103	$19,175
21	29	29	Jeff Green (R)	Diamond Ridge Motorsports	Chevrolet	391	0	running	100	$17,775
22	5	44	Kyle Petty	Petty Enterprises	Pontiac	391	2	running	102	$16,475
23	10	31	Mike Skinner (R)	Richard Childress Racing	Chevrolet	391	0	running	94	$16,275
24	37	41	Steve Grissom	Larry Hedrick Motorsports	Chevrolet	391	0	running	91	$23,075
25	23	8	Hut Stricklin	Stavola Brothers Racing	Ford	390	0	running	88	$22,875
26	4	22	Ward Burton	Bill Davis Racing	Pontiac	390	0	running	85	$22,675
27	15	96	David Green (R)	American Equipment Racing	Chevrolet	390	0	running	82	$15,475
28	39	28	Ernie Irvan	Robert Yates Racing	Ford	389	0	running	79	$27,375
29	43	17	Darrell Waltrip	Darrell Waltrip Motorsports	Chevrolet	389	0	running	76	$22,275
30	38	33	Ken Schrader	Andy Petree Racing	Chevrolet	389	0	running	73	$21,675
31	41	98	John Andretti	Cale Yarborough Motorsports	Ford	389	0	running	70	$21,050
32	34	16	Ted Musgrave	Roush Racing	Ford	388	0	running	67	$18,950
33	32	14	Steve Park	Dale Earnhardt, Inc.	Chevrolet	387	0	running	64	$11,850
34	31	1	Morgan Shepherd	Precision Products Racing	Pontiac	387	0	running	61	$18,750
35	21	46	Wally Dallenbach Jr.	Team SABCO	Chevrolet	386	0	running	58	$11,650
36	20	30	Johnny Benson Jr.	Bahari Racing	Pontiac	384	0	running	55	$18,625
37	25	81	Kenny Wallace	FILMAR Racing	Ford	379	0	engine	52	$18,600
38	11	99	Jeff Burton	Roush Racing	Ford	365	21	running	54	$30,050
39	42	40	Greg Sacks	Team SABCO	Chevrolet	365	0	handling	46	$18,550
40	13	10	Ricky Rudd	Rudd Performance Motorsports	Ford	241	0	crash	43	$26,550
41	36	78	Gary Bradberry	Triad Motorsports	Ford	239	0	crash	40	$11,550
42	22	75	Rick Mast	Butch Mock Motorsports	Ford	178	0	camshaft	37	$18,550
43	40	23	Jimmy Spencer	Travis Carter Enterprises	Ford	111	0	crash	34	$18,550
Failed to qualify
44		11	Brett Bodine	Brett Bodine Racing	Ford					
45		71	Dave Marcis	Marcis Auto Racing	Chevrolet					
46		95	Ed Berrier	Sadler Brothers Racing	Chevrolet					
47		27	Kenny Irwin Jr.	David Blair Motorsports	Ford					
Official race results

Previous race: 1997 DieHard 500	NASCAR Winston Cup Series; 1997 season	Next race: 1997 Dura Lube 500
