= 1997 Dura Lube 500 =

31st race of the 1997 NASCAR Winston Cup Series

Race details
- Race 31 of 32 in the 1997 NASCAR Winston Cup Series
- The 1997 Dura Lube 500 program cover.
- Date: November 2, 1997
- Official name: 10th Annual Dura Lube 500
- Location: Avondale, Arizona, Phoenix International Raceway
- Course: Permanent racing facility
- Course length: 1 miles (1.6 km)
- Distance: 312 laps, 312 mi (502.115 km)
- Average speed: 110.824 miles per hour (178.354 km/h)

Pole position
Driver	Bobby Hamilton	Andy Petree Racing
- Time: 27.360

Most laps led
Driver	Rusty Wallace	Penske Racing South
- Laps: 117

Winner
No. 88	Dale Jarrett	Robert Yates Racing

Television in the United States
- Network: TNN
- Announcers: Eli Gold, Buddy Baker, Dick Berggren

Radio in the United States
- Radio: Motor Racing Network

The 1997 Dura Lube 500 was the 31st and penultimate stock car race of the 1997 NASCAR Winston Cup Series and the 10th iteration of the event. The race was held on Sunday, November 2, Avondale, Arizona at Phoenix International Raceway, a 1-mile (1.6 km) permanent low-banked tri-oval race track. The race took the scheduled 312 laps to complete. At race's end, Robert Yates Racing driver Dale Jarrett, despite being one lap down earlier in the race, would manage to dominate the late stages of the race to take his 15th career NASCAR Winston Cup Series victory and his seventh and final victory of the season. To fill out the top three, Penske Racing South driver Rusty Wallace and Petty Enterprises driver Bobby Hamilton would finish second and third, respectively.

Going into the final race of the season, the 1997 NAPA 500 at Atlanta Motor Speedway, a tight battle between the three mathematical eligible drivers for the championship, Jeff Gordon, Dale Jarrett, and Mark Martin was set. Gordon had 4,598 points, 77 points ahead of Jarrett and 87 points ahead of Martin. If Gordon was able to finish 18th or higher in the race, Gordon would automatically win the championship.

== Background ==
The layout of Phoenix International Raceway, the venue where the race was held.

Phoenix International Raceway – also known as PIR – is a one-mile, low-banked tri-oval race track located in Avondale, Arizona. It is named after the nearby metropolitan area of Phoenix. The motorsport track opened in 1964 and currently hosts two NASCAR race weekends annually. PIR has also hosted the IndyCar Series, CART, USAC and the Rolex Sports Car Series. The raceway is currently owned and operated by International Speedway Corporation.

The raceway was originally constructed with a 2.5 mi (4.0 km) road course that ran both inside and outside of the main tri-oval. In 1991 the track was reconfigured with the current 1.51 mi (2.43 km) interior layout. PIR has an estimated grandstand seating capacity of around 67,000. Lights were installed around the track in 2004 following the addition of a second annual NASCAR race weekend.

=== Entry list ===
- (R) denotes rookie driver.

#	Driver	Team	Make
1	Morgan Shepherd	Precision Products Racing	Pontiac
2	Rusty Wallace	Penske Racing South	Ford
3	Dale Earnhardt	Richard Childress Racing	Chevrolet
4	Sterling Marlin	Morgan–McClure Motorsports	Chevrolet
5	Terry Labonte	Hendrick Motorsports	Chevrolet
6	Mark Martin	Roush Racing	Ford
7	Geoff Bodine	Geoff Bodine Racing	Ford
8	Hut Stricklin	Stavola Brothers Racing	Ford
9	Lake Speed	Melling Racing	Ford
10	Ricky Rudd	Rudd Performance Motorsports	Ford
11	Brett Bodine	Brett Bodine Racing	Ford
14	Steve Park	Dale Earnhardt, Inc.	Chevrolet
16	Ted Musgrave	Roush Racing	Ford
17	Darrell Waltrip	Darrell Waltrip Motorsports	Chevrolet
18	Bobby Labonte	Joe Gibbs Racing	Pontiac
21	Michael Waltrip	Wood Brothers Racing	Ford
22	Ward Burton	Bill Davis Racing	Pontiac
23	Jimmy Spencer	Haas-Carter Motorsports	Ford
24	Jeff Gordon	Hendrick Motorsports	Chevrolet
25	Ricky Craven	Hendrick Motorsports	Chevrolet
27	Kenny Irwin Jr.	David Blair Motorsports	Ford
28	Ernie Irvan	Robert Yates Racing	Ford
29	Jeff Green (R)	Diamond Ridge Motorsports	Chevrolet
30	Johnny Benson Jr.	Bahari Racing	Pontiac
31	Mike Skinner (R)	Richard Childress Racing	Chevrolet
33	Ken Schrader	Andy Petree Racing	Chevrolet
36	Derrike Cope	MB2 Motorsports	Pontiac
37	Jeremy Mayfield	Kranefuss-Haas Racing	Ford
40	Greg Sacks	Team SABCO	Chevrolet
41	Steve Grissom	Larry Hedrick Motorsports	Chevrolet
42	Joe Nemechek	Team SABCO	Chevrolet
43	Bobby Hamilton	Petty Enterprises	Pontiac
44	Kyle Petty	Petty Enterprises	Pontiac
46	Wally Dallenbach Jr.	Team SABCO	Chevrolet
52	Jack Sprague	Hendrick Motorsports	Chevrolet
71	Dave Marcis	Marcis Auto Racing	Chevrolet
75	Rick Mast	Butch Mock Motorsports	Ford
77	Robert Pressley	Jasper Motorsports	Ford
78	Gary Bradberry	Triad Motorsports	Ford
81	Kenny Wallace	FILMAR Racing	Ford
88	Dale Jarrett	Robert Yates Racing	Ford
90	Dick Trickle	Donlavey Racing	Ford
94	Bill Elliott	Bill Elliott Racing	Ford
96	David Green (R)	American Equipment Racing	Chevrolet
97	Chad Little	Roush Racing	Pontiac
98	John Andretti	Cale Yarborough Motorsports	Ford
99	Jeff Burton	Roush Racing	Ford

== Qualifying ==
Qualifying was split into two rounds. The first round was held on Friday, October 31, at 3:30 PM EST. Each driver would have one lap to set a time. During the first round, the top 25 drivers in the round would be guaranteed a starting spot in the race. If a driver was not able to guarantee a spot in the first round, they had the option to scrub their time from the first round and try and run a faster lap time in a second round qualifying run, held on Saturday, November 1, at 1:00 PM EST. As with the first round, each driver would have one lap to set a time. Positions 26-38 would be decided on time, and depending on who needed it, the 39th thru either the 42nd, 43rd, or 44th position would be based on provisionals. Four spots are awarded by the use of provisionals based on owner's points. The fifth is awarded to a past champion who has not otherwise qualified for the race. If no past champion needs the provisional, the field would be limited to 42 cars. If a champion needed it, the field would expand to 43 cars. If the race was a companion race with the NASCAR Winston West Series, four spots would be determined by NASCAR Winston Cup Series provisionals, while the final two spots would be given to teams in the Winston West Series, leaving the field at 44 cars.

Bobby Hamilton, driving for Petty Enterprises, would win the pole, setting a time of 27.360 and an average speed of 131.579 miles per hour (211.756 km/h).

In an obscure ruling, Hendrick Motorsports driver Ricky Craven would earn the 43rd spot based on an owner's points provisional, a spot which at the time was usually reserved to a driver who is a past champion who had not otherwise qualified into the field. At the time, if a champion did not need the spot, the field was only limited to 42 cars. Despite Craven using up all of his seven owner's provisionals within the 1997 season, he had placed the car within the top 38 within the owner's points, thus qualifying himself on an owner's points provisional.

Four drivers would fail to qualify: Wally Dallenbach Jr., Jack Sprague, Morgan Shepherd, and Gary Bradberry.

=== Full qualifying results ===
Pos.	#	Driver	Team	Make	Time	Speed
1	43	Bobby Hamilton	Petty Enterprises	Pontiac	27.360	131.579
2	23	Jimmy Spencer	Travis Carter Enterprises	Ford	27.495	130.933
3	2	Rusty Wallace	Penske Racing South	Ford	27.566	130.596
4	18	Bobby Labonte	Joe Gibbs Racing	Pontiac	27.633	130.279
5	75	Rick Mast	Butch Mock Motorsports	Ford	27.647	130.213
6	33	Ken Schrader	Andy Petree Racing	Chevrolet	27.651	130.194
7	3	Dale Earnhardt	Richard Childress Racing	Chevrolet	27.661	130.147
8	30	Johnny Benson Jr.	Bahari Racing	Pontiac	27.684	130.039
9	88	Dale Jarrett	Robert Yates Racing	Ford	27.688	130.020
10	9	Lake Speed	Melling Racing	Ford	27.690	130.011
11	27	Kenny Irwin Jr.	David Blair Motorsports	Ford	27.705	129.940
12	24	Jeff Gordon	Hendrick Motorsports	Chevrolet	27.714	129.898
13	90	Dick Trickle	Donlavey Racing	Ford	27.716	129.889
14	6	Mark Martin	Roush Racing	Ford	27.755	129.706
15	11	Brett Bodine	Brett Bodine Racing	Ford	27.757	129.697
16	36	Derrike Cope	MB2 Motorsports	Pontiac	27.765	129.660
17	7	Geoff Bodine	Geoff Bodine Racing	Ford	27.767	129.650
18	42	Joe Nemechek	Team SABCO	Chevrolet	27.785	129.566
19	17	Darrell Waltrip	Darrell Waltrip Motorsports	Chevrolet	27.789	129.548
20	41	Steve Grissom	Larry Hedrick Motorsports	Chevrolet	27.790	129.543
21	81	Kenny Wallace	FILMAR Racing	Ford	27.790	129.543
22	37	Jeremy Mayfield	Kranefuss-Haas Racing	Ford	27.799	129.501
23	16	Ted Musgrave	Roush Racing	Ford	27.802	129.487
24	77	Robert Pressley	Jasper Motorsports	Ford	27.820	129.403
25	28	Ernie Irvan	Robert Yates Racing	Ford	27.821	129.399
26	4	Sterling Marlin	Morgan–McClure Motorsports	Chevrolet	27.833	129.343
27	22	Ward Burton	Bill Davis Racing	Pontiac	27.835	129.334
28	40	Greg Sacks	Team SABCO	Chevrolet	27.865	129.194
29	5	Terry Labonte	Hendrick Motorsports	Chevrolet	27.868	129.180
30	21	Michael Waltrip	Wood Brothers Racing	Ford	27.870	129.171
31	14	Steve Park	Dale Earnhardt, Inc.	Chevrolet	27.888	129.088
32	31	Mike Skinner (R)	Richard Childress Racing	Chevrolet	27.889	129.083
33	8	Hut Stricklin	Stavola Brothers Racing	Ford	27.900	129.032
34	44	Kyle Petty	Petty Enterprises	Pontiac	27.916	128.958
35	98	John Andretti	Cale Yarborough Motorsports	Ford	27.917	128.954
36	94	Bill Elliott	Bill Elliott Racing	Ford	27.959	128.760
37	99	Jeff Burton	Roush Racing	Ford	27.980	128.663
38	71	Dave Marcis	Marcis Auto Racing	Chevrolet	27.998	128.581
Provisionals
39	10	Ricky Rudd	Rudd Performance Motorsports	Ford	-*	-*
40	29	Jeff Green (R)	Diamond Ridge Motorsports	Chevrolet	-*	-*
41	96	David Green (R)	American Equipment Racing	Chevrolet	-*	-*
42	97	Chad Little	Roush Racing	Pontiac	-*	-*
Owner's Points Provisional
43	25	Ricky Craven	Hendrick Motorsports	Chevrolet	-*	-*
Failed to qualify
44	46	Wally Dallenbach Jr.	Team SABCO	Chevrolet	-*	-*
45	52	Jack Sprague	Hendrick Motorsports	Chevrolet	-*	-*
46	1	Morgan Shepherd	Precision Products Racing	Pontiac	-*	-*
47	78	Gary Bradberry	Triad Motorsports	Ford	-*	-*
Official qualifying results

== Race results ==
Fin	St	#	Driver	Team	Make	Laps	Led	Status	Pts	Winnings
1	9	88	Dale Jarrett	Robert Yates Racing	Ford	312	73	running	180	$99,830
2	3	2	Rusty Wallace	Penske Racing South	Ford	312	117	running	180	$63,355
3	1	43	Bobby Hamilton	Petty Enterprises	Pontiac	312	91	running	170	$47,225
4	6	33	Ken Schrader	Andy Petree Racing	Chevrolet	312	0	running	160	$38,588
5	7	3	Dale Earnhardt	Richard Childress Racing	Chevrolet	312	1	running	160	$39,300
6	14	6	Mark Martin	Roush Racing	Ford	312	0	running	150	$33,265
7	8	30	Johnny Benson Jr.	Bahari Racing	Pontiac	312	3	running	151	$29,015
8	20	41	Steve Grissom	Larry Hedrick Motorsports	Chevrolet	311	0	running	142	$27,505
9	34	44	Kyle Petty	Petty Enterprises	Pontiac	311	0	running	138	$19,905
10	17	7	Geoff Bodine	Geoff Bodine Racing	Ford	311	2	running	139	$29,905
11	29	5	Terry Labonte	Hendrick Motorsports	Chevrolet	311	0	running	130	$36,105
12	19	17	Darrell Waltrip	Darrell Waltrip Motorsports	Chevrolet	311	0	running	127	$25,205
13	37	99	Jeff Burton	Roush Racing	Ford	311	7	running	129	$30,705
14	2	23	Jimmy Spencer	Travis Carter Enterprises	Ford	311	3	running	126	$24,605
15	36	94	Bill Elliott	Bill Elliott Racing	Ford	311	0	running	118	$25,330
16	16	36	Derrike Cope	MB2 Motorsports	Pontiac	311	0	running	115	$16,580
17	12	24	Jeff Gordon	Hendrick Motorsports	Chevrolet	310	0	running	112	$29,880
18	25	28	Ernie Irvan	Robert Yates Racing	Ford	310	0	running	109	$27,555
19	22	37	Jeremy Mayfield	Kranefuss-Haas Racing	Ford	310	0	running	106	$16,155
20	11	27	Kenny Irwin Jr.	David Blair Motorsports	Ford	310	0	running	103	$12,170
21	28	40	Greg Sacks	Team SABCO	Chevrolet	310	0	running	100	$15,745
22	23	16	Ted Musgrave	Roush Racing	Ford	310	0	running	97	$22,620
23	4	18	Bobby Labonte	Joe Gibbs Racing	Pontiac	310	0	running	94	$27,095
24	18	42	Joe Nemechek	Team SABCO	Chevrolet	310	0	running	91	$15,445
25	42	97	Chad Little	Roush Racing	Pontiac	310	0	running	88	$15,320
26	30	21	Michael Waltrip	Wood Brothers Racing	Ford	310	0	running	85	$22,195
27	26	4	Sterling Marlin	Morgan–McClure Motorsports	Chevrolet	310	15	running	87	$27,970
28	32	31	Mike Skinner (R)	Richard Childress Racing	Chevrolet	309	0	running	79	$16,045
29	41	96	David Green (R)	American Equipment Racing	Chevrolet	309	0	running	76	$14,920
30	33	8	Hut Stricklin	Stavola Brothers Racing	Ford	309	0	running	73	$21,895
31	5	75	Rick Mast	Butch Mock Motorsports	Ford	309	0	running	70	$21,370
32	40	29	Jeff Green (R)	Diamond Ridge Motorsports	Chevrolet	309	0	running	67	$11,595
33	15	11	Brett Bodine	Brett Bodine Racing	Ford	309	0	running	64	$18,570
34	38	71	Dave Marcis	Marcis Auto Racing	Chevrolet	309	0	running	61	$11,545
35	21	81	Kenny Wallace	FILMAR Racing	Ford	308	0	running	58	$18,520
36	39	10	Ricky Rudd	Rudd Performance Motorsports	Ford	308	0	running	55	$26,495
37	10	9	Lake Speed	Melling Racing	Ford	307	0	running	52	$11,450
38	24	77	Robert Pressley	Jasper Motorsports	Ford	302	0	running	49	$11,390
39	35	98	John Andretti	Cale Yarborough Motorsports	Ford	299	0	running	46	$18,390
40	13	90	Dick Trickle	Donlavey Racing	Ford	294	0	ignition	43	$11,390
41	31	14	Steve Park	Dale Earnhardt, Inc.	Chevrolet	240	0	engine	40	$11,390
42	27	22	Ward Burton	Bill Davis Racing	Pontiac	128	0	crash	37	$18,390
43	43	25	Ricky Craven	Hendrick Motorsports	Chevrolet	39	0	crash	34	$18,390
Failed to qualify
44		46	Wally Dallenbach Jr.	Team SABCO	Chevrolet					
45		52	Jack Sprague	Hendrick Motorsports	Chevrolet					
46		1	Morgan Shepherd	Precision Products Racing	Pontiac					
47		78	Gary Bradberry	Triad Motorsports	Ford					
Official race results

Previous race: 1997 AC Delco 400	NASCAR Winston Cup Series; 1997 season	Next race: 1997 NAPA 500
