= 1996 MBNA 500 =

25th race of the 1996 NASCAR Winston Cup Series

Race details
- Race 25 of 31 in the 1996 NASCAR Winston Cup Series
- The 1996 Miller 500 program cover, featuring Ward Burton.
- Date: September 15, 1996
- Official name: 28th Annual MBNA 500
- Location: Dover, Delaware, Dover International Speedway
- Course: Permanent racing facility
- Course length: 1 miles (1.6 km)
- Distance: 500 laps, 500 mi (804.672 km)
- Average speed: 105.646 miles per hour (170.021 km/h)

Pole position
Driver	Bobby Labonte	Joe Gibbs Racing
- Time: 23.213

Most laps led
Driver	Jeff Gordon	Hendrick Motorsports
- Laps: 204

Winner
No. 24	Jeff Gordon	Hendrick Motorsports

Television in the United States
- Network: TNN
- Announcers: Eli Gold, Dick Berggren, Buddy Baker

Radio in the United States
- Radio: Motor Racing Network

The 1996 MBNA 500 was the 25th stock car race of the 1996 NASCAR Winston Cup Series and the 28th iteration of the event. The race was held on Sunday, September 15, 1996, in Dover, Delaware at Dover International Speedway, a 1-mile (1.6 km) permanent oval-shaped racetrack. The race took the scheduled 500 laps to complete. In the final laps of the race, Hendrick Motorsports driver Jeff Gordon would manage to dominate the late stages of the race to take his 17th career NASCAR Winston Cup Series victory and his eighth victory of the season. To fill out the top three, Penske Racing South driver Rusty Wallace and Robert Yates Racing driver Dale Jarrett would finish second and third, respectively.

== Background ==
The layout of Dover International Speedway, the venue where the race was held.

Dover International Speedway is an oval race track in Dover, Delaware that has held at least two NASCAR races since it opened in 1969. The track features one layout, a 1-mile (1.6 km) concrete oval, with 24° banking in the turns and 9° banking on the straights. The speedway is owned and operated by Speedway Motorsports.

=== Entry list ===
- (R) denotes rookie driver.

#	Driver	Team	Make
1	Rick Mast	Precision Products Racing	Pontiac
2	Rusty Wallace	Penske Racing South	Ford
3	Dale Earnhardt	Richard Childress Racing	Chevrolet
4	Sterling Marlin	Morgan–McClure Motorsports	Chevrolet
5	Terry Labonte	Hendrick Motorsports	Chevrolet
6	Mark Martin	Roush Racing	Ford
7	Geoff Bodine	Geoff Bodine Racing	Ford
8	Hut Stricklin	Stavola Brothers Racing	Ford
9	Lake Speed	Melling Racing	Ford
10	Ricky Rudd	Rudd Performance Motorsports	Ford
11	Brett Bodine	Brett Bodine Racing	Ford
12	Derrike Cope	Bobby Allison Motorsports	Ford
15	Wally Dallenbach Jr.	Bud Moore Engineering	Ford
16	Ted Musgrave	Roush Racing	Ford
17	Darrell Waltrip	Darrell Waltrip Motorsports	Chevrolet
18	Bobby Labonte	Joe Gibbs Racing	Chevrolet
21	Michael Waltrip	Wood Brothers Racing	Ford
22	Ward Burton	Bill Davis Racing	Pontiac
23	Jimmy Spencer	Haas-Carter Motorsports	Ford
24	Jeff Gordon	Hendrick Motorsports	Chevrolet
25	Ken Schrader	Hendrick Motorsports	Chevrolet
28	Ernie Irvan	Robert Yates Racing	Ford
29	Chad Little	Diamond Ridge Motorsports	Chevrolet
30	Johnny Benson Jr. (R)	Bahari Racing	Pontiac
31	Mike Skinner	Richard Childress Racing	Chevrolet
33	Robert Pressley	Leo Jackson Motorsports	Chevrolet
37	Jeremy Mayfield	Kranefuss-Haas Racing	Ford
41	Ricky Craven	Larry Hedrick Motorsports	Chevrolet
42	Kyle Petty	Team SABCO	Pontiac
43	Bobby Hamilton	Petty Enterprises	Pontiac
49	Eric Smith	Campbell Racing	Ford
71	Dave Marcis	Marcis Auto Racing	Chevrolet
75	Morgan Shepherd	Butch Mock Motorsports	Ford
77	Bobby Hillin Jr.	Jasper Motorsports	Ford
81	Kenny Wallace	FILMAR Racing	Ford
87	Joe Nemechek	NEMCO Motorsports	Chevrolet
88	Dale Jarrett	Robert Yates Racing	Ford
90	Dick Trickle	Donlavey Racing	Ford
94	Bill Elliott	Bill Elliott Racing	Ford
95	Gary Bradberry	Sadler Brothers Racing	Ford
98	Jeremy Mayfield	Cale Yarborough Motorsports	Ford
99	Jeff Burton	Roush Racing	Ford

== Qualifying ==
Qualifying was split into two rounds. The first round was held on Friday, September 13, at 3:00 PM EST. Each driver would have one lap to set a time. During the first round, the top 25 drivers in the round would be guaranteed a starting spot in the race. If a driver was not able to guarantee a spot in the first round, they had the option to scrub their time from the first round and try and run a faster lap time in a second round qualifying run, held on Saturday, September 14, at 11:30 AM EST. As with the first round, each driver would have one lap to set a time. For this specific race, positions 26-38 would be decided on time, and depending on who needed it, a select amount of positions were given to cars who had not otherwise qualified but were high enough in owner's points.

Bobby Labonte, driving for Joe Gibbs Racing, would win the pole, setting a time of 23.213 and an average speed of 155.086 miles per hour (249.587 km/h).

Eric Smith was the only driver to fail to qualify.

=== Full qualifying results ===
Pos.	#	Driver	Team	Make	Time	Speed
1	18	Bobby Labonte	Joe Gibbs Racing	Chevrolet	23.213	155.086
2	1	Rick Mast	Precision Products Racing	Pontiac	23.327	154.328
3	24	Jeff Gordon	Hendrick Motorsports	Chevrolet	23.375	154.011
4	5	Terry Labonte	Hendrick Motorsports	Chevrolet	23.401	153.840
5	7	Geoff Bodine	Geoff Bodine Racing	Ford	23.406	153.807
6	2	Rusty Wallace	Penske Racing South	Ford	23.431	153.643
7	90	Dick Trickle	Donlavey Racing	Ford	23.431	153.643
8	6	Mark Martin	Roush Racing	Ford	23.439	153.590
9	88	Dale Jarrett	Robert Yates Racing	Ford	23.440	153.584
10	98	John Andretti	Cale Yarborough Motorsports	Ford	23.440	153.584
11	8	Hut Stricklin	Stavola Brothers Racing	Ford	23.455	153.485
12	25	Ken Schrader	Hendrick Motorsports	Chevrolet	23.472	153.374
13	75	Morgan Shepherd	Butch Mock Motorsports	Ford	23.479	153.329
14	10	Ricky Rudd	Rudd Performance Motorsports	Ford	23.480	153.322
15	12	Derrike Cope	Bobby Allison Motorsports	Ford	23.494	153.231
16	31	Mike Skinner	Richard Childress Racing	Chevrolet	23.494	153.231
17	16	Ted Musgrave	Roush Racing	Ford	23.498	153.205
18	81	Kenny Wallace	FILMAR Racing	Ford	23.499	153.198
19	28	Ernie Irvan	Robert Yates Racing	Ford	23.549	152.873
20	3	Dale Earnhardt	Richard Childress Racing	Chevrolet	23.560	152.801
21	9	Lake Speed	Melling Racing	Ford	23.561	152.795
22	41	Ricky Craven	Larry Hedrick Motorsports	Chevrolet	23.587	152.626
23	21	Michael Waltrip	Wood Brothers Racing	Ford	23.611	152.471
24	42	Kyle Petty	Team SABCO	Pontiac	23.619	152.420
25	15	Wally Dallenbach Jr.	Bud Moore Engineering	Ford	23.621	152.407
Failed to lock in Round 1
26	4	Sterling Marlin	Morgan–McClure Motorsports	Chevrolet	23.487	153.276
27	94	Bill Elliott	Bill Elliott Racing	Ford	23.623	152.394
28	33	Robert Pressley	Leo Jackson Motorsports	Chevrolet	23.635	152.316
29	99	Jeff Burton	Roush Racing	Ford	23.655	152.188
30	30	Johnny Benson Jr. (R)	Bahari Racing	Pontiac	23.658	152.168
31	29	Chad Little	Diamond Ridge Motorsports	Chevrolet	23.668	152.104
32	95	Gary Bradberry	Sadler Brothers Racing	Ford	23.686	151.989
33	22	Ward Burton	Bill Davis Racing	Pontiac	23.698	151.912
34	77	Bobby Hillin Jr.	Jasper Motorsports	Ford	23.712	151.822
35	87	Joe Nemechek	NEMCO Motorsports	Chevrolet	23.715	151.803
36	37	Jeremy Mayfield	Kranefuss-Haas Racing	Ford	23.758	151.528
37	11	Brett Bodine	Brett Bodine Racing	Ford	23.763	151.496
38	71	Dave Marcis	Marcis Auto Racing	Chevrolet	23.776	151.413
Provisionals
39	23	Jimmy Spencer	Travis Carter Enterprises	Ford	-*	-*
40	43	Bobby Hamilton	Petty Enterprises	Pontiac	-*	-*
Champion's Provisional
41	17	Darrell Waltrip	Darrell Waltrip Motorsports	Chevrolet	-*	-*
Failed to qualify
42	49	Eric Smith	Campbell Racing	Ford	-*	-*
Official first round qualifying results
Official starting lineup

== Race results ==
Fin	St	#	Driver	Team	Make	Laps	Led	Status	Pts	Winnings
1	3	24	Jeff Gordon	Hendrick Motorsports	Chevrolet	500	204	running	185	$153,630
2	6	2	Rusty Wallace	Penske Racing South	Ford	500	0	running	170	$54,580
3	9	88	Dale Jarrett	Robert Yates Racing	Ford	500	28	running	170	$40,880
4	1	18	Bobby Labonte	Joe Gibbs Racing	Chevrolet	500	3	running	165	$50,390
5	8	6	Mark Martin	Roush Racing	Ford	500	103	running	160	$48,820
6	2	1	Rick Mast	Precision Products Racing	Pontiac	500	0	running	150	$33,740
7	33	22	Ward Burton	Bill Davis Racing	Pontiac	500	39	running	151	$35,490
8	24	42	Kyle Petty	Team SABCO	Pontiac	500	0	running	142	$29,890
9	23	21	Michael Waltrip	Wood Brothers Racing	Ford	500	0	running	138	$28,740
10	40	43	Bobby Hamilton	Petty Enterprises	Pontiac	500	2	running	139	$33,190
11	5	7	Geoff Bodine	Geoff Bodine Racing	Ford	500	0	running	130	$31,090
12	34	77	Bobby Hillin Jr.	Jasper Motorsports	Ford	500	4	running	132	$19,890
13	21	9	Lake Speed	Melling Racing	Ford	499	0	running	124	$26,490
14	10	98	John Andretti	Cale Yarborough Motorsports	Ford	498	0	running	121	$19,090
15	36	37	Jeremy Mayfield	Kranefuss-Haas Racing	Ford	498	0	running	118	$26,890
16	20	3	Dale Earnhardt	Richard Childress Racing	Chevrolet	498	11	running	120	$31,515
17	26	4	Sterling Marlin	Morgan–McClure Motorsports	Chevrolet	498	1	running	117	$31,515
18	13	75	Morgan Shepherd	Butch Mock Motorsports	Ford	498	0	running	109	$18,100
19	16	31	Mike Skinner	Richard Childress Racing	Chevrolet	498	0	running	106	$14,215
20	18	81	Kenny Wallace	FILMAR Racing	Ford	498	0	running	103	$15,965
21	4	5	Terry Labonte	Hendrick Motorsports	Chevrolet	496	57	running	105	$30,515
22	12	25	Ken Schrader	Hendrick Motorsports	Chevrolet	496	0	running	97	$24,765
23	7	90	Dick Trickle	Donlavey Racing	Ford	495	0	running	94	$17,615
24	30	30	Johnny Benson Jr. (R)	Bahari Racing	Pontiac	492	0	running	91	$25,465
25	35	87	Joe Nemechek	NEMCO Motorsports	Chevrolet	490	0	crash	88	$24,490
26	38	71	Dave Marcis	Marcis Auto Racing	Chevrolet	490	0	running	85	$17,140
27	37	11	Brett Bodine	Brett Bodine Racing	Ford	486	0	running	82	$23,990
28	27	94	Bill Elliott	Bill Elliott Racing	Ford	483	0	running	79	$23,840
29	25	15	Wally Dallenbach Jr.	Bud Moore Engineering	Ford	483	0	running	76	$23,690
30	39	23	Jimmy Spencer	Travis Carter Enterprises	Ford	472	0	running	73	$23,640
31	15	12	Derrike Cope	Bobby Allison Motorsports	Ford	466	0	crash	70	$23,090
32	28	33	Robert Pressley	Leo Jackson Motorsports	Chevrolet	461	1	crash	72	$20,530
33	17	16	Ted Musgrave	Roush Racing	Ford	455	0	crash	64	$20,480
34	14	10	Ricky Rudd	Rudd Performance Motorsports	Ford	433	0	running	61	$28,430
35	22	41	Ricky Craven	Larry Hedrick Motorsports	Chevrolet	202	0	crash	58	$20,230
36	19	28	Ernie Irvan	Robert Yates Racing	Ford	199	47	crash	60	$29,205
37	32	95	Gary Bradberry	Sadler Brothers Racing	Ford	156	0	crash	52	$13,205
38	11	8	Hut Stricklin	Stavola Brothers Racing	Ford	91	0	crash	49	$13,205
39	41	17	Darrell Waltrip	Darrell Waltrip Motorsports	Chevrolet	74	0	engine	46	$20,205
40	29	99	Jeff Burton	Roush Racing	Ford	4	0	crash	43	$13,205
41	31	29	Chad Little	Diamond Ridge Motorsports	Chevrolet	3	0	crash	40	$20,205
Official race results

Previous race: 1996 Miller 400 (Richmond)	NASCAR Winston Cup Series; 1996 season	Next race: 1996 Hanes 500
