= 1996 Hanes 500 =

26th race of the 1996 NASCAR Winston Cup Series

Race details
- Race 26 of 31 in the 1996 NASCAR Winston Cup Series
- The 1996 Hanes 500 program cover, featuring Dale Earnhardt.
- Date: September 22, 1996
- Official name: 48th Annual Hanes 500
- Location: Ridgeway, Virginia, Martinsville Speedway
- Course: Permanent racing facility
- Course length: 0.526 miles (0.847 km)
- Distance: 500 laps, 263 mi (423.257 km)
- Average speed: 82.223 miles per hour (132.325 km/h)

Pole position
Driver	Bobby Hamilton	Petty Enterprises
- Time: 20.119

Most laps led
Driver	Bobby Hamilton	Petty Enterprises
- Laps: 331

Winner
No. 24	Jeff Gordon	Hendrick Motorsports

Television in the United States
- Network: ESPN
- Announcers: Bob Jenkins, Ned Jarrett, Benny Parsons

Radio in the United States
- Radio: Motor Racing Network

The 1996 Hanes 500 was the 26th stock car race of the 1996 NASCAR Winston Cup Series and the 48th iteration of the event. The race was held on Sunday, September 22, 1996, in Martinsville, Virginia at Martinsville Speedway, a 0.526 miles (0.847 km) permanent oval-shaped short track. The race took the scheduled 500 laps to complete. In a one-lap shootout to the finish, Hendrick Motorsports driver Jeff Gordon would manage to defend the field to take his 18th career NASCAR Winston Cup Series victory and his ninth victory of the season. To fill out the top three, Hendrick Motorsports driver Terry Labonte and Petty Enterprises driver Bobby Hamilton finished second and third, respectively.

== Background ==
The layout of Martinsville Speedway, the venue where the race was held.

Martinsville Speedway is a NASCAR-owned stock car racing track located in Henry County, in Ridgeway, Virginia, just to the south of Martinsville. At 0.526 miles (0.847 km) in length, it is the shortest track in the NASCAR Cup Series. The track was also one of the first paved oval tracks in NASCAR, being built in 1947 by H. Clay Earles. It is also the only remaining race track that has been on the NASCAR circuit from its beginning in 1948.

=== Entry list ===
- (R) denotes rookie driver.

#	Driver	Team	Make
1	Rick Mast	Precision Products Racing	Pontiac
2	Rusty Wallace	Penske Racing South	Ford
3	Dale Earnhardt	Richard Childress Racing	Chevrolet
4	Sterling Marlin	Morgan–McClure Motorsports	Chevrolet
5	Terry Labonte	Hendrick Motorsports	Chevrolet
6	Mark Martin	Roush Racing	Ford
7	Geoff Bodine	Geoff Bodine Racing	Ford
8	Hut Stricklin	Stavola Brothers Racing	Ford
9	Lake Speed	Melling Racing	Ford
10	Ricky Rudd	Rudd Performance Motorsports	Ford
11	Brett Bodine	Brett Bodine Racing	Ford
12	Derrike Cope	Bobby Allison Motorsports	Ford
15	Wally Dallenbach Jr.	Bud Moore Engineering	Ford
16	Ted Musgrave	Roush Racing	Ford
17	Darrell Waltrip	Darrell Waltrip Motorsports	Chevrolet
18	Bobby Labonte	Joe Gibbs Racing	Chevrolet
21	Michael Waltrip	Wood Brothers Racing	Ford
22	Ward Burton	Bill Davis Racing	Pontiac
23	Jimmy Spencer	Haas-Carter Motorsports	Ford
24	Jeff Gordon	Hendrick Motorsports	Chevrolet
25	Ken Schrader	Hendrick Motorsports	Chevrolet
28	Ernie Irvan	Robert Yates Racing	Ford
29	Chad Little	Diamond Ridge Motorsports	Chevrolet
30	Johnny Benson Jr. (R)	Bahari Racing	Pontiac
33	Robert Pressley	Leo Jackson Motorsports	Chevrolet
37	Jeremy Mayfield	Kranefuss-Haas Racing	Ford
41	Ricky Craven	Larry Hedrick Motorsports	Chevrolet
42	Kyle Petty	Team SABCO	Pontiac
43	Bobby Hamilton	Petty Enterprises	Pontiac
46	Stacy Compton	Monroe Racing	Chevrolet
71	Dave Marcis	Marcis Auto Racing	Chevrolet
75	Morgan Shepherd	Butch Mock Motorsports	Ford
77	Bobby Hillin Jr.	Jasper Motorsports	Ford
78	Billy Standridge	Triad Motorsports	Ford
81	Kenny Wallace	FILMAR Racing	Ford
87	Joe Nemechek	NEMCO Motorsports	Chevrolet
88	Dale Jarrett	Robert Yates Racing	Ford
90	Dick Trickle	Donlavey Racing	Ford
94	Bill Elliott	Bill Elliott Racing	Ford
95	Gary Bradberry	Sadler Brothers Racing	Ford
98	Jeremy Mayfield	Cale Yarborough Motorsports	Ford
99	Jeff Burton	Roush Racing	Ford

== Qualifying ==
Qualifying was split into two rounds. The first round was held on Friday, September 20, at 3:00 PM EST. Each driver would have one lap to set a time. During the first round, the top 25 drivers in the round would be guaranteed a starting spot in the race. If a driver was not able to guarantee a spot in the first round, they had the option to scrub their time from the first round and try and run a faster lap time in a second round qualifying run, held on Saturday, September 21, at 12:30 PM EST. As with the first round, each driver would have one lap to set a time. For this specific race, positions 26-32 would be decided on time, and depending on who needed it, a select amount of positions were given to cars who had not otherwise qualified but were high enough in owner's points.

Bobby Hamilton, driving for Petty Enterprises, would win the pole, setting a time of 20.119 and an average speed of 94.120 miles per hour (151.471 km/h).

Six drivers would fail to qualify: Derrike Cope, Brett Bodine, Chad Little, Ward Burton, Billy Standridge, and Gary Bradberry.

=== Full qualifying results ===
Pos.	#	Driver	Team	Make	Time	Speed
1	43	Bobby Hamilton	Petty Enterprises	Pontiac	20.119	94.120
2	2	Rusty Wallace	Penske Racing South	Ford	20.170	93.882
3	6	Mark Martin	Roush Racing	Ford	20.194	93.770
4	88	Dale Jarrett	Robert Yates Racing	Ford	20.255	93.488
5	75	Morgan Shepherd	Butch Mock Motorsports	Ford	20.292	93.318
6	98	John Andretti	Cale Yarborough Motorsports	Ford	20.292	93.318
7	42	Kyle Petty	Team SABCO	Pontiac	20.299	93.285
8	90	Dick Trickle	Donlavey Racing	Ford	20.305	93.258
9	94	Bill Elliott	Bill Elliott Racing	Ford	20.307	93.249
10	24	Jeff Gordon	Hendrick Motorsports	Chevrolet	20.326	93.161
11	5	Terry Labonte	Hendrick Motorsports	Chevrolet	20.327	93.157
12	18	Bobby Labonte	Joe Gibbs Racing	Chevrolet	20.328	93.152
13	37	Jeremy Mayfield	Kranefuss-Haas Racing	Ford	20.342	93.088
14	15	Wally Dallenbach Jr.	Bud Moore Engineering	Ford	20.350	93.052
15	33	Robert Pressley	Leo Jackson Motorsports	Chevrolet	20.350	93.052
16	25	Ken Schrader	Hendrick Motorsports	Chevrolet	20.353	93.038
17	99	Jeff Burton	Roush Racing	Ford	20.369	92.965
18	28	Ernie Irvan	Robert Yates Racing	Ford	20.397	92.837
19	3	Dale Earnhardt	Richard Childress Racing	Chevrolet	20.406	92.796
20	7	Geoff Bodine	Geoff Bodine Racing	Ford	20.407	92.792
21	16	Ted Musgrave	Roush Racing	Ford	20.412	92.769
22	30	Johnny Benson Jr. (R)	Bahari Racing	Pontiac	20.414	92.760
23	46	Stacy Compton	Monroe Racing	Chevrolet	20.426	92.705
24	81	Kenny Wallace	FILMAR Racing	Ford	20.435	92.665
25	8	Hut Stricklin	Stavola Brothers Racing	Ford	20.448	92.606
Failed to lock in Round 1
26	21	Michael Waltrip	Wood Brothers Racing	Ford	20.337	93.111
27	87	Joe Nemechek	NEMCO Motorsports	Chevrolet	20.360	93.006
28	9	Lake Speed	Melling Racing	Ford	20.375	92.937
29	1	Rick Mast	Precision Products Racing	Pontiac	20.453	92.583
30	17	Darrell Waltrip	Darrell Waltrip Motorsports	Chevrolet	20.465	92.529
31	77	Bobby Hillin Jr.	Jasper Motorsports	Ford	20.471	92.502
32	71	Dave Marcis	Marcis Auto Racing	Chevrolet	20.472	92.497
Provisionals
33	10	Ricky Rudd	Rudd Performance Motorsports	Ford	-*	-*
34	4	Sterling Marlin	Morgan–McClure Motorsports	Chevrolet	-*	-*
35	23	Jimmy Spencer	Travis Carter Enterprises	Ford	-*	-*
36	41	Ricky Craven	Larry Hedrick Motorsports	Chevrolet	-*	-*
Failed to qualify
37	12	Derrike Cope	Bobby Allison Motorsports	Ford	-*	-*
38	11	Brett Bodine	Brett Bodine Racing	Ford	-*	-*
39	29	Chad Little	Diamond Ridge Motorsports	Chevrolet	-*	-*
40	22	Ward Burton	Bill Davis Racing	Pontiac	-*	-*
41	78	Billy Standridge	Triad Motorsports	Ford	-*	-*
42	95	Gary Bradberry	Sadler Brothers Racing	Ford	-*	-*
Official first round qualifying results
Official starting lineup

== Race results ==
Fin	St	#	Driver	Team	Make	Laps	Led	Status	Pts	Winnings
1	10	24	Jeff Gordon	Hendrick Motorsports	Chevrolet	500	133	running	180	$93,825
2	11	5	Terry Labonte	Hendrick Motorsports	Chevrolet	500	1	running	175	$56,175
3	1	43	Bobby Hamilton	Petty Enterprises	Pontiac	500	331	running	175	$50,426
4	29	1	Rick Mast	Precision Products Racing	Pontiac	500	0	running	160	$36,125
5	6	98	John Andretti	Cale Yarborough Motorsports	Ford	500	0	running	155	$26,235
6	5	75	Morgan Shepherd	Butch Mock Motorsports	Ford	500	0	running	150	$19,625
7	20	7	Geoff Bodine	Geoff Bodine Racing	Ford	500	0	running	146	$29,875
8	7	42	Kyle Petty	Team SABCO	Pontiac	500	0	running	142	$25,450
9	3	6	Mark Martin	Roush Racing	Ford	499	0	running	138	$31,350
10	24	81	Kenny Wallace	FILMAR Racing	Ford	499	0	running	134	$18,050
11	17	99	Jeff Burton	Roush Racing	Ford	499	0	running	130	$17,085
12	18	28	Ernie Irvan	Robert Yates Racing	Ford	498	0	running	127	$26,500
13	8	90	Dick Trickle	Donlavey Racing	Ford	498	0	running	124	$15,300
14	26	21	Michael Waltrip	Wood Brothers Racing	Ford	498	0	running	121	$22,500
15	19	3	Dale Earnhardt	Richard Childress Racing	Chevrolet	498	0	running	118	$29,100
16	4	88	Dale Jarrett	Robert Yates Racing	Ford	498	0	running	115	$19,500
17	22	30	Johnny Benson Jr. (R)	Bahari Racing	Pontiac	498	0	running	112	$22,600
18	9	94	Bill Elliott	Bill Elliott Racing	Ford	497	0	running	109	$21,105
19	35	23	Jimmy Spencer	Travis Carter Enterprises	Ford	497	0	running	106	$20,450
20	21	16	Ted Musgrave	Roush Racing	Ford	497	0	running	103	$22,050
21	12	18	Bobby Labonte	Joe Gibbs Racing	Chevrolet	496	0	running	100	$25,750
22	14	15	Wally Dallenbach Jr.	Bud Moore Engineering	Ford	494	0	running	97	$19,950
23	30	17	Darrell Waltrip	Darrell Waltrip Motorsports	Chevrolet	493	0	running	94	$19,800
24	31	77	Bobby Hillin Jr.	Jasper Motorsports	Ford	493	0	running	91	$12,650
25	25	8	Hut Stricklin	Stavola Brothers Racing	Ford	492	0	running	88	$12,650
26	36	41	Ricky Craven	Larry Hedrick Motorsports	Chevrolet	491	0	running	85	$19,350
27	27	87	Joe Nemechek	NEMCO Motorsports	Chevrolet	490	0	running	82	$18,800
28	28	9	Lake Speed	Melling Racing	Ford	489	0	running	79	$16,200
29	32	71	Dave Marcis	Marcis Auto Racing	Chevrolet	484	0	running	76	$9,100
30	16	25	Ken Schrader	Hendrick Motorsports	Chevrolet	477	0	running	73	$16,050
31	34	4	Sterling Marlin	Morgan–McClure Motorsports	Chevrolet	455	0	crash	70	$25,650
32	15	33	Robert Pressley	Leo Jackson Motorsports	Chevrolet	439	0	running	67	$16,050
33	23	46	Stacy Compton	Monroe Racing	Chevrolet	403	0	running	64	$9,050
34	13	37	Jeremy Mayfield	Kranefuss-Haas Racing	Ford	325	0	brakes	61	$16,050
35	33	10	Ricky Rudd	Rudd Performance Motorsports	Ford	283	0	rear end	58	$24,050
36	2	2	Rusty Wallace	Penske Racing South	Ford	148	35	water pump	60	$31,550
Official race results

Previous race: 1996 MBNA 500	NASCAR Winston Cup Series; 1996 season	Next race: 1996 Tyson Holly Farms 400
