= 1996 Miller 400 (Richmond) =

24th race of the 1996 NASCAR Winston Cup Series

Race details
- Race 24 of 31 in the 1996 NASCAR Winston Cup Series
- The 1996 Miller 400 program cover, featuring Rusty Wallace. Artwork by NASCAR artist Sam Bass.
- Date: September 7, 1996
- Official name: 39th Annual Miller 400
- Location: Richmond, Virginia, Richmond International Raceway
- Course: Permanent racing facility
- Course length: 0.75 miles (1.21 km)
- Distance: 400 laps, 300 mi (482.803 km)
- Average speed: 105.469 miles per hour (169.736 km/h)

Pole position
Driver	Mark Martin	Roush Racing
- Time: 21.997

Most laps led
Driver	Jeff Gordon	Hendrick Motorsports
- Laps: 168

Winner
No. 28	Ernie Irvan	Robert Yates Racing

Television in the United States
- Network: ESPN
- Announcers: Bob Jenkins, Ned Jarrett, Benny Parsons

Radio in the United States
- Radio: Motor Racing Network

The 1996 Miller 400 was the 24th stock car race of the 1996 NASCAR Winston Cup Series and the 39th iteration of the event. The race was held on Saturday, September 7, 1996, in Richmond, Virginia, at Richmond International Raceway, a 0.75 miles (1.21 km) D-shaped oval. The race took the scheduled 400 laps to completion. In the final laps of the race, Robert Yates Racing driver Ernie Irvan would manage to defend and come out victorious against Hendrick Motorsports driver Jeff Gordon, only beating Gordon by a tenth of a second. The win was Irvan's 14th career NASCAR Winston Cup Series victory and his second and final victory of the season. To fill out the top three, Roush Racing driver Jeff Burton would finish third.

== Background ==
The layout of Richmond International Raceway, the venue where the race was at.

Richmond International Raceway (RIR) is a 3/4-mile (1.2 km), D-shaped, asphalt race track located just outside Richmond, Virginia in Henrico County. Known as "America's premier short track".

=== Entry list ===
- (R) denotes rookie driver.

#	Driver	Team	Make
1	Rick Mast	Precision Products Racing	Pontiac
2	Rusty Wallace	Penske Racing South	Ford
3	Dale Earnhardt	Richard Childress Racing	Chevrolet
4	Sterling Marlin	Morgan–McClure Motorsports	Chevrolet
5	Terry Labonte	Hendrick Motorsports	Chevrolet
6	Mark Martin	Roush Racing	Ford
7	Geoff Bodine	Geoff Bodine Racing	Ford
8	Hut Stricklin	Stavola Brothers Racing	Ford
9	Lake Speed	Melling Racing	Ford
10	Ricky Rudd	Rudd Performance Motorsports	Ford
11	Brett Bodine	Brett Bodine Racing	Ford
12	Derrike Cope	Bobby Allison Motorsports	Ford
15	Wally Dallenbach Jr.	Bud Moore Engineering	Ford
16	Ted Musgrave	Roush Racing	Ford
17	Darrell Waltrip	Darrell Waltrip Motorsports	Chevrolet
18	Bobby Labonte	Joe Gibbs Racing	Chevrolet
21	Michael Waltrip	Wood Brothers Racing	Ford
22	Ward Burton	Bill Davis Racing	Pontiac
23	Jimmy Spencer	Haas-Carter Motorsports	Ford
24	Jeff Gordon	Hendrick Motorsports	Chevrolet
25	Ken Schrader	Hendrick Motorsports	Chevrolet
27	Todd Bodine	David Blair Motorsports	Ford
28	Ernie Irvan	Robert Yates Racing	Ford
29	Chad Little	Diamond Ridge Motorsports	Chevrolet
30	Johnny Benson Jr. (R)	Bahari Racing	Pontiac
33	Robert Pressley	Leo Jackson Motorsports	Chevrolet
37	Jeremy Mayfield	Kranefuss-Haas Racing	Ford
40	Jay Sauter	Team SABCO	Chevrolet
41	Ricky Craven	Larry Hedrick Motorsports	Chevrolet
42	Kyle Petty	Team SABCO	Pontiac
43	Bobby Hamilton	Petty Enterprises	Pontiac
46	Stacy Compton	Monroe Racing	Chevrolet
71	Dave Marcis	Marcis Auto Racing	Chevrolet
75	Morgan Shepherd	Butch Mock Motorsports	Ford
77	Bobby Hillin Jr.	Jasper Motorsports	Ford
81	Kenny Wallace	FILMAR Racing	Ford
87	Joe Nemechek	NEMCO Motorsports	Chevrolet
88	Dale Jarrett	Robert Yates Racing	Ford
90	Dick Trickle	Donlavey Racing	Ford
94	Bill Elliott	Bill Elliott Racing	Ford
95	Gary Bradberry	Sadler Brothers Racing	Ford
98	Jeremy Mayfield	Cale Yarborough Motorsports	Ford
99	Jeff Burton	Roush Racing	Ford

== Qualifying ==
Qualifying was originally scheduled to be split into two rounds. The first round was scheduled to be held on Friday, September 6, at 5:30 PM EST. However, only six drivers were able to set a lap before qualifying was rained out and postponed until Saturday, September 7, at 12:00 PM EST. Qualifying was eventually combined into only one round. Each driver would have one lap to set a time. For this specific race, positions 26-36 would be decided on time, and depending on who needed it, a select amount of positions were given to cars who had not otherwise qualified but were high enough in owner's points.

Mark Martin, driving for Roush Racing, would win the pole, setting a time of 21.997 and an average speed of 122.744 miles per hour (197.537 km/h).

Three drivers would fail to qualify: Stacy Compton, Jay Sauter, and Gary Bradberry.

=== Full qualifying results ===
Pos.	#	Driver	Team	Make	Time	Speed
1	6	Mark Martin	Roush Racing	Ford	21.997	122.744
2	24	Jeff Gordon	Hendrick Motorsports	Chevrolet	22.022	122.605
3	99	Jeff Burton	Roush Racing	Ford	22.060	122.393
4	18	Bobby Labonte	Joe Gibbs Racing	Chevrolet	22.065	122.366
5	22	Ward Burton	Bill Davis Racing	Pontiac	22.078	122.294
6	87	Joe Nemechek	NEMCO Motorsports	Chevrolet	22.079	122.288
7	94	Bill Elliott	Bill Elliott Racing	Ford	22.085	122.255
8	88	Dale Jarrett	Robert Yates Racing	Ford	22.088	122.238
9	16	Ted Musgrave	Roush Racing	Ford	22.132	121.995
10	2	Rusty Wallace	Penske Racing South	Ford	22.145	121.924
11	25	Ken Schrader	Hendrick Motorsports	Chevrolet	22.149	121.902
12	43	Bobby Hamilton	Petty Enterprises	Pontiac	22.169	121.792
13	9	Lake Speed	Melling Racing	Ford	22.172	121.775
14	27	Todd Bodine	David Blair Motorsports	Ford	22.183	121.715
15	90	Dick Trickle	Donlavey Racing	Ford	22.187	121.693
16	28	Ernie Irvan	Robert Yates Racing	Ford	22.189	121.682
17	4	Sterling Marlin	Morgan–McClure Motorsports	Chevrolet	22.199	121.627
18	12	Derrike Cope	Bobby Allison Motorsports	Ford	22.205	121.594
19	42	Kyle Petty	Team SABCO	Pontiac	22.208	121.578
20	81	Kenny Wallace	FILMAR Racing	Ford	22.214	121.545
21	1	Rick Mast	Precision Products Racing	Pontiac	22.225	121.485
22	21	Michael Waltrip	Wood Brothers Racing	Ford	22.229	121.463
23	3	Dale Earnhardt	Richard Childress Racing	Chevrolet	22.241	121.397
24	5	Terry Labonte	Hendrick Motorsports	Chevrolet	22.250	121.348
25	41	Ricky Craven	Larry Hedrick Motorsports	Chevrolet	22.258	121.305
26	11	Brett Bodine	Brett Bodine Racing	Ford	22.263	121.277
27	71	Dave Marcis	Marcis Auto Racing	Chevrolet	22.275	121.212
28	23	Jimmy Spencer	Travis Carter Enterprises	Ford	22.276	121.207
29	33	Robert Pressley	Leo Jackson Motorsports	Chevrolet	22.278	121.196
30	7	Geoff Bodine	Geoff Bodine Racing	Ford	22.285	121.158
31	98	John Andretti	Cale Yarborough Motorsports	Ford	22.338	120.870
32	29	Chad Little	Diamond Ridge Motorsports	Chevrolet	22.309	121.027
33	15	Wally Dallenbach Jr.	Bud Moore Engineering	Ford	22.336	120.881
34	30	Johnny Benson Jr. (R)	Bahari Racing	Pontiac	22.338	120.870
35	37	Jeremy Mayfield	Kranefuss-Haas Racing	Ford	22.306	121.044
36	17	Darrell Waltrip	Darrell Waltrip Motorsports	Chevrolet	22.349	120.811
Provisionals
37	10	Ricky Rudd	Rudd Performance Motorsports	Ford	-*	-*
38	75	Morgan Shepherd	Butch Mock Motorsports	Ford	-*	-*
39	8	Hut Stricklin	Stavola Brothers Racing	Ford	-*	-*
40	77	Bobby Hillin Jr.	Jasper Motorsports	Ford	-*	-*
Failed to qualify
41	46	Stacy Compton	Monroe Racing	Chevrolet	-*	-*
42	40	Jay Sauter	Team SABCO	Chevrolet	-*	-*
43	95	Gary Bradberry	Sadler Brothers Racing	Ford	-*	-*
Official starting lineup

== Race results ==
Fin	St	#	Driver	Team	Make	Laps	Led	Status	Pts	Winnings
1	16	28	Ernie Irvan	Robert Yates Racing	Ford	400	88	running	180	$86,665
2	2	24	Jeff Gordon	Hendrick Motorsports	Chevrolet	400	168	running	180	$59,640
3	3	99	Jeff Burton	Roush Racing	Ford	400	113	running	170	$50,755
4	8	88	Dale Jarrett	Robert Yates Racing	Ford	400	11	running	165	$30,505
5	24	5	Terry Labonte	Hendrick Motorsports	Chevrolet	400	1	running	160	$37,155
6	10	2	Rusty Wallace	Penske Racing South	Ford	400	0	running	150	$30,005
7	12	43	Bobby Hamilton	Petty Enterprises	Pontiac	400	0	running	146	$29,005
8	18	12	Derrike Cope	Bobby Allison Motorsports	Ford	400	0	running	142	$24,705
9	1	6	Mark Martin	Roush Racing	Ford	400	1	running	143	$34,805
10	34	30	Johnny Benson Jr. (R)	Bahari Racing	Pontiac	400	13	running	139	$26,155
11	4	18	Bobby Labonte	Joe Gibbs Racing	Chevrolet	400	0	running	130	$28,105
12	37	10	Ricky Rudd	Rudd Performance Motorsports	Ford	399	0	running	127	$29,405
13	11	25	Ken Schrader	Hendrick Motorsports	Chevrolet	399	0	running	124	$23,155
14	22	21	Michael Waltrip	Wood Brothers Racing	Ford	399	0	running	121	$22,955
15	9	16	Ted Musgrave	Roush Racing	Ford	399	0	running	118	$23,855
16	7	94	Bill Elliott	Bill Elliott Racing	Ford	399	4	running	120	$23,500
17	30	7	Geoff Bodine	Geoff Bodine Racing	Ford	399	0	running	112	$26,400
18	19	42	Kyle Petty	Team SABCO	Pontiac	399	0	running	109	$22,150
19	21	1	Rick Mast	Precision Products Racing	Pontiac	398	0	running	106	$22,025
20	23	3	Dale Earnhardt	Richard Childress Racing	Chevrolet	398	0	running	103	$30,100
21	17	4	Sterling Marlin	Morgan–McClure Motorsports	Chevrolet	398	0	running	100	$27,850
22	36	17	Darrell Waltrip	Darrell Waltrip Motorsports	Chevrolet	398	0	running	97	$21,825
23	38	75	Morgan Shepherd	Butch Mock Motorsports	Ford	398	0	running	94	$14,650
24	39	8	Hut Stricklin	Stavola Brothers Racing	Ford	398	0	running	91	$14,525
25	26	11	Brett Bodine	Brett Bodine Racing	Ford	397	0	running	88	$21,575
26	29	33	Robert Pressley	Leo Jackson Motorsports	Chevrolet	397	0	running	85	$21,250
27	15	90	Dick Trickle	Donlavey Racing	Ford	397	0	running	82	$14,125
28	25	41	Ricky Craven	Larry Hedrick Motorsports	Chevrolet	397	0	running	79	$21,000
29	35	37	Jeremy Mayfield	Kranefuss-Haas Racing	Ford	396	0	running	76	$20,975
30	28	23	Jimmy Spencer	Travis Carter Enterprises	Ford	396	0	running	73	$20,925
31	13	9	Lake Speed	Melling Racing	Ford	396	0	running	70	$20,375
32	40	77	Bobby Hillin Jr.	Jasper Motorsports	Ford	396	0	running	67	$10,850
33	33	15	Wally Dallenbach Jr.	Bud Moore Engineering	Ford	395	0	running	64	$17,845
34	27	71	Dave Marcis	Marcis Auto Racing	Chevrolet	395	1	running	66	$10,825
35	14	27	Todd Bodine	David Blair Motorsports	Ford	395	0	running	58	$10,825
36	31	98	John Andretti	Cale Yarborough Motorsports	Ford	394	0	running	55	$10,825
37	5	22	Ward Burton	Bill Davis Racing	Pontiac	362	0	crash	52	$25,825
38	20	81	Kenny Wallace	FILMAR Racing	Ford	308	0	rear end	49	$10,825
39	6	87	Joe Nemechek	NEMCO Motorsports	Chevrolet	301	0	transmission	46	$17,825
40	32	29	Chad Little	Diamond Ridge Motorsports	Chevrolet	38	0	crash	43	$17,825
Official race results

Previous race: 1996 Mountain Dew Southern 500	NASCAR Winston Cup Series; 1996 season	Next race: 1996 MBNA 500
