= Dale Earnhardt =

American racing driver (1951–2001)

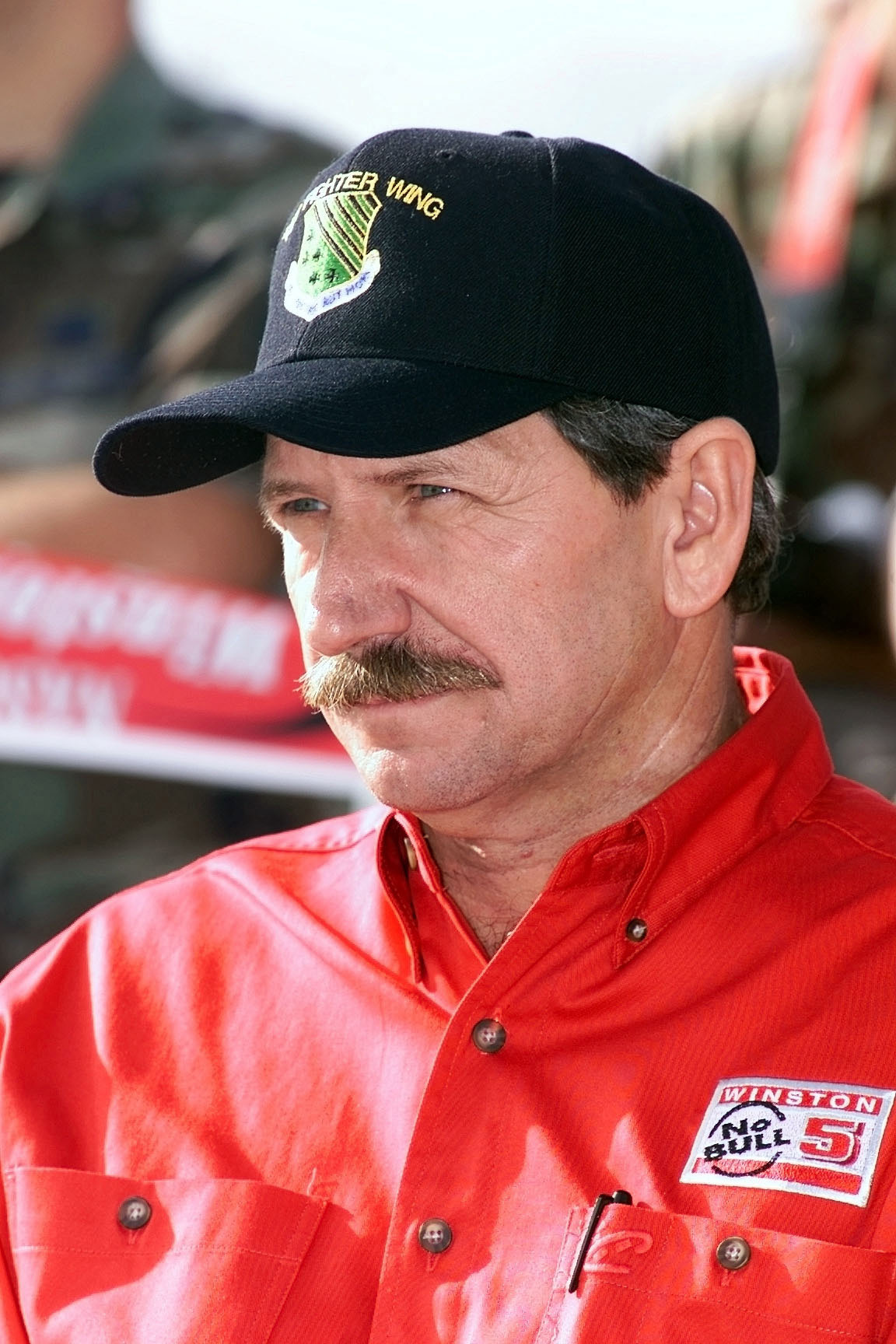
- Earnhardt in 2000
- Born: April 29, 1951; Kannapolis, North Carolina, U.S.
- Died: February 18, 2001 (aged 49); Daytona Beach, Florida, U.S.
- Cause of death: Basilar skull fracture sustained from 2001 Daytona 500 crash
- Height: 6 ft 1 in (185 cm)
- Weight: 195 lb (88 kg; 13 st 13 lb)
- Achievements: 1980, 1986, 1987, 1990, 1991, 1993, 1994 Winston Cup Series Champion; Tied with Richard Petty and Jimmie Johnson for most NASCAR Cup Series Championships (7); 1990, 1995, 1999, 2000 IROC Champion; 1998 Daytona 500 winner as driver; 2001 Daytona 500 winner as owner (Note: Michael Waltrip won seconds after Earnhardt's fatal crash); 1995 Brickyard 400 winner; 1987, 1989, 1990 Southern 500 winner; 1986, 1992, 1993 Coca-Cola 600 winner; 1990, 1994, 1999, 2000 Winston 500 winner; The Winston winner (1987, 1990, 1993); Led Winston Cup Series in wins in 1987 and 1990; Led Winston Cup Series in poles in 1990; Winner of the first ever Budweiser Late Model Sportsman Series race in 1982
- Awards: 1979 Winston Cup Series Rookie of the Year; Named one of NASCAR's 50 Greatest Drivers (1998); 2001 Winston Cup Series Most Popular Driver (posthumously); Motorsports Hall of Fame Inductee (2002); International Motorsports Hall of Fame Inductee (2006); NASCAR Hall of Fame (2010 - Inaugural Class); Named one of NASCAR's 75 Greatest Drivers (2023)

NASCAR Cup Series career
- 676 races run over 27 years
- Best finish: 1st (1980, 1986, 1987, 1990, 1991, 1993, 1994)
- First race: 1975 World 600 (Charlotte)
- Last race: 2001 Daytona 500 (Daytona)
- First win: 1979 Southeastern 500 (Bristol)
- Last win: 2000 Winston 500 (Talladega)
Wins	Top tens	Poles
76	428	22

NASCAR O'Reilly Auto Parts Series career
- 136 races run over 13 years
- Best finish: 21st (1982)
- First race: 1982 Goody's 300 (Daytona)
- Last race: 1994 All Pro 300 (Charlotte)
- First win: 1982 Goody's 300 (Daytona)
- Last win: 1994 Goody's 300 (Daytona)
Wins	Top tens	Poles
21	75	7

Signature
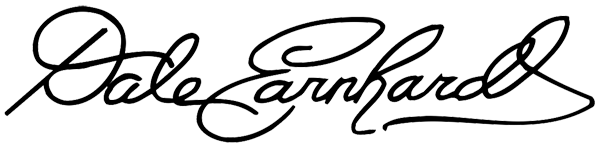

Ralph Dale Earnhardt (/ˈɜːrnhɑːrt/; April 29, 1951 – February 18, 2001) was an American professional stock car driver and racing team owner, who raced from 1975 to 2001 in the former NASCAR Winston Cup Series (now called the NASCAR Cup Series), most notably driving the No. 3 Chevrolet for Richard Childress Racing. His aggressive driving style earned him the nicknames "the Intimidator", "the Man in Black" and "Ironhead"; after his son Dale Earnhardt Jr. joined the Cup Series circuit in 1999, Earnhardt was generally known by the retronyms Dale Earnhardt Sr. and Dale Sr. He is widely regarded as one of the greatest drivers in NASCAR history and was named as one of the NASCAR's 50 Greatest Drivers class in 1998.

The third child of racing driver Ralph Earnhardt and Martha Earnhardt, he began his career in 1975 in the World 600. Earnhardt won a total of 76 Winston Cup races over the course of his 26-year career, including crown jewel victories in four Winston 500s (1990, 1994, 1999, and 2000), three Cola-Cola 600s (1986, 1992, and 1993), three Southern 500s (1987, 1989, and 1990), the Brickyard 400 in 1995, and the 1998 Daytona 500. Along with his 76 career points wins, he has also won 24 non-points exhibition events, bringing his overall Winston Cup win total to 100, one of only four drivers in NASCAR history to do so. He is the only driver in NASCAR history to score at least one win in four different and consecutive decades (scoring his first career win in 1979, 38 wins in the 1980s, 35 wins in the 1990s, & scoring his final two career wins in 2000). He also earned seven Winston Cup championships, a record held with Richard Petty and Jimmie Johnson.

On February 18, 2001, Earnhardt died as a result of a basilar skull fracture sustained in a sudden last-lap crash during the Daytona 500. His death was regarded in the racing industry as being a crucial moment in improving safety in all aspects of car racing, especially NASCAR. He was 49 years old. Earnhardt has been inducted into numerous halls of fame, including the NASCAR Hall of Fame inaugural class in 2010.

== Personal life ==
Ralph Dale Earnhardt was born on April 29, 1951, in the suburb of Kannapolis, North Carolina, as the third child of Martha (née Coleman, 1930–2021) and Ralph Earnhardt (1928–1973). Earnhardt's father was one of the best short-track drivers in North Carolina at the time and won his first and only NASCAR Sportsman Championship in 1956 at Greenville Pickens Speedway in Greenville, South Carolina. In 1963 at the age of twelve, Earnhardt secretly drove his father's car in one of his races and had a near victory against one of his father's closest competitors. In 1972, he raced his father at Metrolina Speedway in a race with cars from semi mod and sportsman divisions. Although Ralph did not want his son to pursue a career as a race car driver, Dale dropped out of school to pursue his dreams. Ralph was a hard teacher for Dale, and after Ralph suddenly died of a heart attack at his home in 1973 at the age of 45, it took many years before Dale felt as though he had finally "proven" himself to his father. Earnhardt had four siblings: two brothers, Danny (died 2021) and Randy (died 2013); and two sisters, Cathy and Kaye.

Earnhardt was married three times. In 1968, at the age of seventeen, Earnhardt married his first wife, Latane Brown. Their son, Kerry, was born a year later. Earnhardt and Brown divorced in 1970. In 1971, Earnhardt married his second wife, Brenda Gee, the daughter of NASCAR car builder Robert Gee. In his marriage with Gee, Earnhardt had two children: a daughter, Kelley King Earnhardt, in 1972, and a son, Dale Earnhardt Jr., in 1974. Not long after Dale Jr. was born, Earnhardt and Gee divorced. Earnhardt then married his third wife, Teresa Houston, in 1982. She gave birth to their daughter, Taylor Nicole Earnhardt, in 1988.

Earnhardt owned farmland in Mooresville, North Carolina, he would actively work on the farm and raise cattle. He was also an avid outdoorsman and enjoyed hunting.

On July 16, 1987, Earnhardt opened the Dale Earnhardt Chevrolet in Newton, North Carolina, fulfilling his long-standing desire to become a Chevrolet dealer.

Earnhardt was also active with the Make-A-Wish Foundation. In 1998, he granted the wish of Wessa Miller, a young girl who wanted to give him a penny for good luck in the Daytona 500. Earnhardt glued the penny to his car's dashboard and went on to win the race.

== NASCAR career ==
=== Early Winston Cup career (1975–1978) ===
Earnhardt began his professional career in the NASCAR Winston Cup Series in 1975, making his points race debut at Charlotte Motor Speedway in North Carolina in the longest race on the Cup circuit—the 1975 World 600. He had made his Grand National debut in 1974 in an unofficial invitational exhibition race at Metrolina Speedway, where with eight laps to go he got under Richard Childress and spun out when battling for third. He drove the No. 8 Ed Negre Dodge Charger and finished 22nd in that race, just one spot ahead of his future car owner, Richard Childress. Earnhardt competed in eight more races until 1979.

=== Rod Osterlund Racing (1979–1980) ===
When he joined car owner Rod Osterlund Racing in a season that included a rookie class of future stars including champions Earnhardt, and Terry Labonte and multiple race winners Harry Gant and Geoff Bodine in his rookie season. Earnhardt won his first race at Bristol, captured four poles, scored eleven top-fives and seventeen top-tens, and finished seventh in the points standings despite missing four races due to a broken collarbone, winning Rookie of the Year honors.

During his sophomore season, Earnhardt, now with twenty-year-old Doug Richert as his crew chief, began the season winning the Busch Clash. With wins at Atlanta, Bristol, Nashville, Martinsville, and Charlotte, Earnhardt won his first Winston Cup points championship. He is the only driver in NASCAR Cup history to follow a Rookie of the Year title with a NASCAR Winston Cup Championship the next season. He was also the third driver in NASCAR history to win both the Rookie of the Year and Winston Cup Series championship, following David Pearson (1960, 1966) and Richard Petty (1959, 1964), and the only one to do both back-to-back. Ten drivers have since joined this exclusive club: Rusty Wallace (1984, 1989), Alan Kulwicki (1986, 1992), Jeff Gordon (1993, 1995), Tony Stewart (1999, 2002), Matt Kenseth (2000, 2003), Kevin Harvick (2001, 2014), Kyle Busch (2005, 2015), Joey Logano (2009, 2018), Chase Elliott (2016, 2020), and Kyle Larson (2014, 2021).

=== Rod Osterlund Racing, Stacy Racing, and Richard Childress Racing (1981) ===
1981 would prove to be tumultuous for the defending Winston Cup champion. Sixteen races into the season, Rod Osterlund suddenly sold his team to Jim Stacy, an entrepreneur from Kentucky who entered NASCAR in 1977. After just four races, Earnhardt fell out with Stacy and left the team. Earnhardt finished out the year driving Pontiacs for Richard Childress Racing and managed to place seventh in the final points standings. Earnhardt departed RCR at the end of the season, citing a lack of chemistry.

Earnhardt was also a color commentator for the Busch Clash, while he also drove on that same day.

=== Bud Moore Engineering (1982–1983) ===
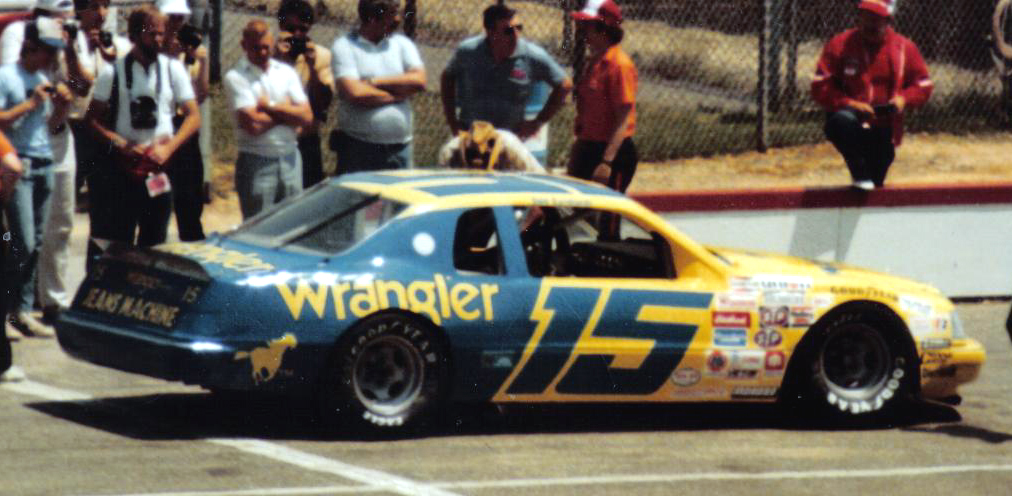
Earnhardt's 1983 Ford Thunderbird

The following year, at Childress's suggestion, Earnhardt joined car owner Bud Moore for the 1982 and 1983 seasons driving the No. 15 Wrangler Jeans-sponsored Ford Thunderbird (the only full-time Ford ride in his career). During the 1982 season, Earnhardt struggled. Although he won at Darlington, he failed to finish eighteen of the thirty races and ended the season 12th in points, the worst of his career. He also suffered a broken kneecap at Pocono Raceway when he flipped after contact with Tim Richmond. In 1983, Earnhardt rebounded and won his first of twelve Twin 125 Daytona 500 qualifying races. He won at Nashville and at Talladega, finishing eighth in the points standings, despite failing to finish thirteen of the thirty races.

=== Return to Richard Childress Racing (1984–2001) ===
==== 1984–1985 ====
After the 1983 season, Earnhardt returned to Richard Childress Racing, replacing Ricky Rudd in the No. 3. Rudd went to Bud Moore's No. 15, replacing Earnhardt. Wrangler sponsored both drivers at their respective teams. During the 1984 and 1985 seasons, Earnhardt went to victory lane six times, at Talladega, Atlanta, Richmond, Bristol (twice), and Martinsville, where he finished fourth and eighth in the season standings respectively.

==== 1986–1987 ====
The 1986 season saw Earnhardt win his second career Winston Cup Championship and the first owner's championship for Richard Childress Racing. He won five races and had sixteen top-fives and 23 top-tens. Earnhardt successfully defended his championship the following year, going to victory lane eleven times and winning the championship by 489 points over Bill Elliott. In the process, Earnhardt set a NASCAR modern-era record of four consecutive wins and won five of the first seven races. In the 1987 season, he earned the nickname "the Intimidator", due in part to the 1987 Winston All-Star Race. During this race, Earnhardt was briefly forced into the infield grass but kept control of his car and returned to the track without giving up his lead. The maneuver is now referred to as the "Pass in the Grass", even though Earnhardt did not pass anyone while he was off the track. After The Winston, an angry fan sent Bill France Jr. a letter threatening to kill Earnhardt at Pocono, Watkins Glen, or Dover, prompting the FBI to provide security for Earnhardt on the three tracks. The investigation was closed after the races at the three tracks finished without incident. Many of Earnhardt's competitors on the racetrack disliked his personal driving style. Earnhardt's relentless pursuit of victory on the racetrack combined with his uniquely offensive driving ability led to many rivalries with fellow drivers and fines levied by NASCAR. In 1987, NASCAR began to implement a measure that was designed to incentivize less aggressive driving styles by forcing drivers who cause these undesired hazardous racing conditions to be subjected to time at the garage region during the race.

==== 1988–1989 ====
The 1988 season saw Earnhardt racing with a new sponsor, GM Goodwrench, after Wrangler Jeans dropped its sponsorship in 1987. During this season, he changed the color of his paint scheme from blue and yellow to the signature black in which the No. 3 car was painted for the rest of his life, aside from special paint schemes for non-points races. He won three races in 1988, finishing third in the points standings behind Bill Elliott in first and Rusty Wallace in second. The following year, Earnhardt won five races, but a late spin out at North Wilkesboro arguably cost him the 1989 championship, as Rusty Wallace edged him out for it by twelve points (Earnhardt won the final race, but Wallace finished fifteenth when needing to finish at least eighteenth to win). It was his first season for the GM Goodwrench Chevrolet Lumina.

==== 1990–1995 ====
The 1990 season started for Earnhardt with victories in the Busch Clash and his heat of the Gatorade Twin 125's. Near the end of the Daytona 500, he had a dominant forty-second lead when the final caution flag came out with a handful of laps to go. When the green flag waved, Earnhardt was leading Derrike Cope. On the final lap, Earnhardt ran over a piece of metal, which was later revealed as a bell housing, in turn 3, cutting down a tire. Cope, in an upset, won the race while Earnhardt finished fifth after leading 155 of the 200 laps. The No. 3 Goodwrench-sponsored Chevy team took the flat tire that cost them the win and hung it on the shop wall as a reminder of how close they had come to winning the Daytona 500. Earnhardt won nine races that season and won his fourth Winston Cup title, beating Mark Martin by 26 points. He also became the first multiple winner of the annual all-star race, The Winston. The 1991 season saw Earnhardt win his fifth Winston Cup championship. This season, he scored four wins and won the championship by 195 points over Ricky Rudd. One of his wins came at North Wilkesboro, in a race where Harry Gant had a chance to set a single-season record by winning his fifth consecutive race, breaking a record held by Earnhardt. Late in the race, Gant lost his brakes, which gave Earnhardt the chance he needed to make the pass for the win and maintain his record.

Despite entering the next season as a championship favorite, 1992 would be one of Earnhardt's worst seasons. Scoring only one victory all year, at the Coca-Cola 600 in Charlotte, and ending a thirteen-race win streak by Ford teams, Earnhardt finished a career-low twelfth in the points for the second time in his career, with three last place finishes (Daytona and Talladega in July and Martinsville in September), and his lowest points finish since joining Richard Childress Racing. He still made the trip to the annual Awards Banquet with Rusty Wallace but did not have the best seat in the house. Wallace stated he and Earnhardt had to sit on the backs of their chairs to see, and Earnhardt said, "This sucks, I should have gone hunting." At the end of the year, longtime crew chief Kirk Shelmerdine left to become a driver. Andy Petree took over as crew chief. Hiring Petree turned out to be beneficial, as Earnhardt returned to the front in 1993. He once again came close to a win at the Daytona 500 and dominated Speedweeks before finishing second to Dale Jarrett on a last-lap pass. Earnhardt scored six wins en route to his sixth Winston Cup title, including wins in the first prime-time Coca-Cola 600 and The Winston, both at Charlotte, and the Pepsi 400 at Daytona. He beat Rusty Wallace for the championship by 80 points. On November 14, 1993, after the season-ending Hooters 500 at Atlanta, the race winner Wallace and 1993 series champion Earnhardt ran a dual Polish Victory Lap together while carrying #28 and #7 flags commemorating 1992 Daytona 500 winner Davey Allison and 1992 NASCAR Winston Cup Series champion Alan Kulwicki respectively, both passed away during the 93 season; Allison attempting to land his helicopter at Talladega Superspeedway and Kulwicki in an airplane crash in Tennessee.

In 1994, Earnhardt achieved a feat that he himself had believed to be impossible—he scored his seventh Winston Cup championship, tying Richard Petty. He was very consistent, scoring four wins, and after Ernie Irvan was sidelined due to a near-deadly crash at Michigan (the two were neck-and-neck at the top of the points up until the crash), won the title by over 400 points over Mark Martin. Earnhardt sealed the deal at Rockingham by winning the race over Rick Mast. It was his final NASCAR championship and his final season for the GM Goodwrench Chevrolet Lumina. Earnhardt started off the 1995 season by finishing second in the Daytona 500 to Sterling Marlin. He won five races in 1995, including his first road course victory at Sears Point. He also won the Brickyard 400 at Indianapolis Motor Speedway, a win he called the biggest of his career. But in the end, Earnhardt lost the championship to Jeff Gordon by 34 points. The GM Goodwrench racing team changed to Chevrolet Monte Carlos.

Earnhardt almost was ready to leave the No. 3 at the end of the 1995 season, according to his former crew chief Larry McReynolds. At the time, McReynolds was the crew chief for the No. 28 Havoline Ford Thunderbird at Robert Yates Racing. Earnhardt had actually been approached by Yates to drive the No. 28 for the 1995 season in place of Ernie Irvan, who was injured in a crash during the 1994 season. Instead, Robert Yates signed Dale Jarrett to a one-year deal to drive the No. 28. During the 1995 season, Yates was being pressed by his manufacturer to start a second team and sent a contract to Earnhardt to drive it. Earnhardt never returned the contract, and according to McReynolds the reason he did not sign was because he only wanted to drive the No. 28 for Yates; the team fully intended to put Irvan back behind the wheel of his old car once he was able to resume driving. Instead, Earnhardt stayed with RCR and the No. 3, while Jarrett was signed to drive Yates' new car, numbered 88.

==== 1996–1999 ====
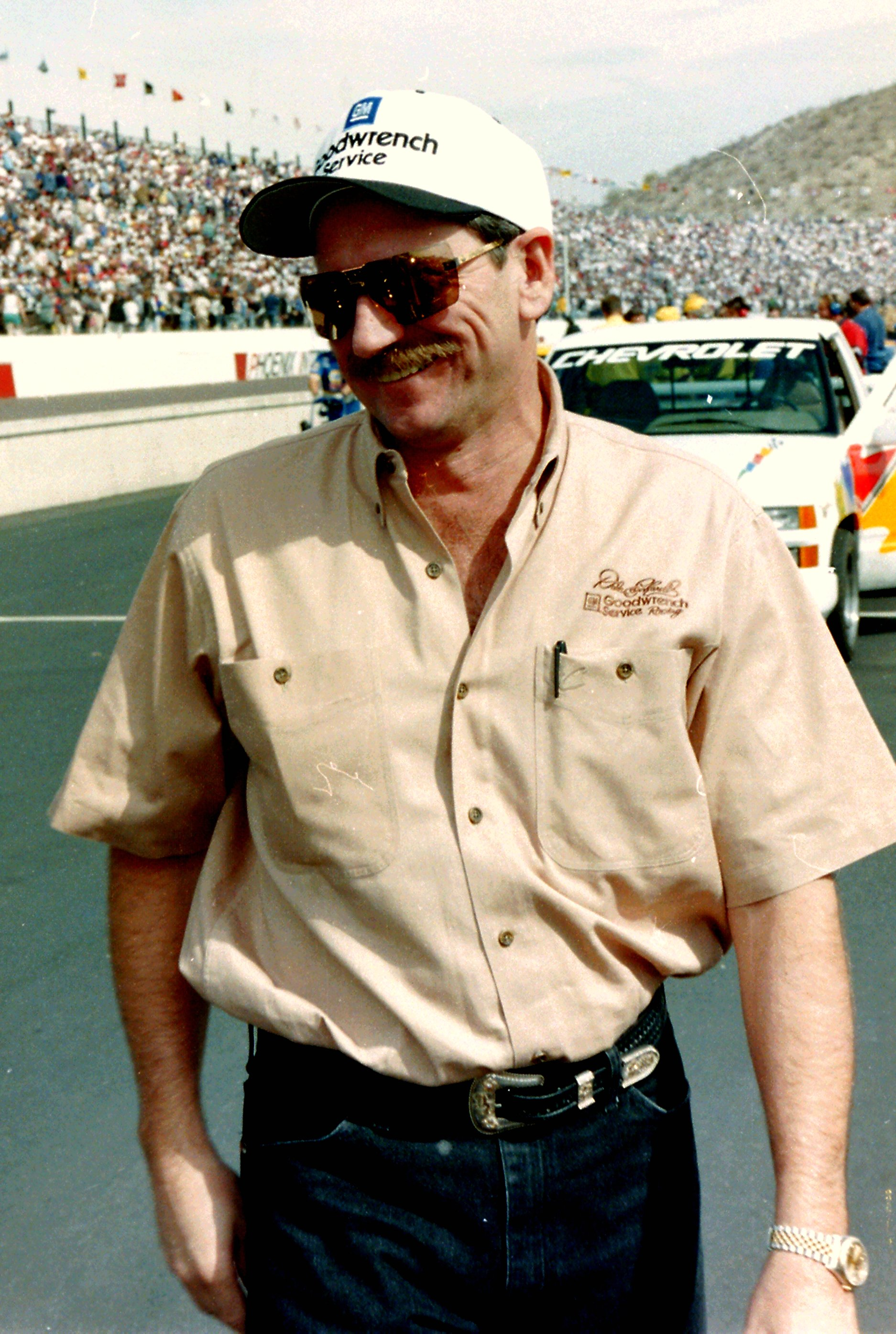
Earnhardt at Phoenix International Raceway.

1996 for Earnhardt started just like it had done in 1993—he dominated Speedweeks, only to finish second in the Daytona 500 to Dale Jarrett for the second time. He won early in the year, scoring consecutive victories at Rockingham and Atlanta. On July 28 in the DieHard 500 at Talladega, he was second in points and looking for his eighth season title, despite the departure of crew chief Andy Petree. Late in the race, Ernie Irvan lost control of his No. 28 Havoline-sponsored Ford Thunderbird, made contact with the No. 4 Kodak-sponsored Chevy Monte Carlo of Sterling Marlin, and ignited a crash that saw Earnhardt's No. 3 Chevrolet hit the tri-oval wall nearly head-on at almost 200 mph. After hitting the wall, Earnhardt's car flipped and slid across the track, in front of race traffic. His car was hit in the roof and windshield. This accident, as well as a similar accident that led to the death of Russell Phillips at Charlotte, led NASCAR to mandate the "Earnhardt Bar", a metal brace located in the center of the windshield that reinforces the roof in case of a similar crash. This bar is also required in NASCAR-owned United SportsCar Racing and its predecessors for road racing.

Rain delays had canceled the live telecast of the race, and most fans first learned of the accident during the night's sports newscasts. Video of the crash showed what appeared to be a fatal incident, but once medical workers arrived at the car, Earnhardt climbed out and waved to the crowd, refusing to be loaded onto a stretcher despite a broken collarbone, sternum, and shoulder blade. Although the incident looked like it would end his season early, Earnhardt refused to stay out of the car. The next week at Indianapolis, he started the race but exited the car on the first pit stop, allowing Mike Skinner to take the wheel. When asked, Earnhardt said that vacating the No. 3 car was the hardest thing he had ever done. The following weekend at Watkins Glen, he drove the No. 3 Goodwrench Chevrolet to the fastest time in qualifying, earning the "True Grit" pole. T-shirts emblazoned with Earnhardt's face were quickly printed up, brandishing the caption, "It Hurt So Good". Earnhardt led for most of the race and looked to have victory in hand, but fatigue took its toll and he ended up sixth behind race winner Geoff Bodine. Earnhardt did not win again in 1996 but still finished fourth in the standings behind Terry Labonte, Jeff Gordon, and Dale Jarrett, with two wins, 13 top-fives, 17 top-tens, and his last two career poles, with an average finish of 10.6. David Smith departed as crew chief of the No. 3 team and RCR at the end of the year for personal reasons, and he was replaced by Larry McReynolds.

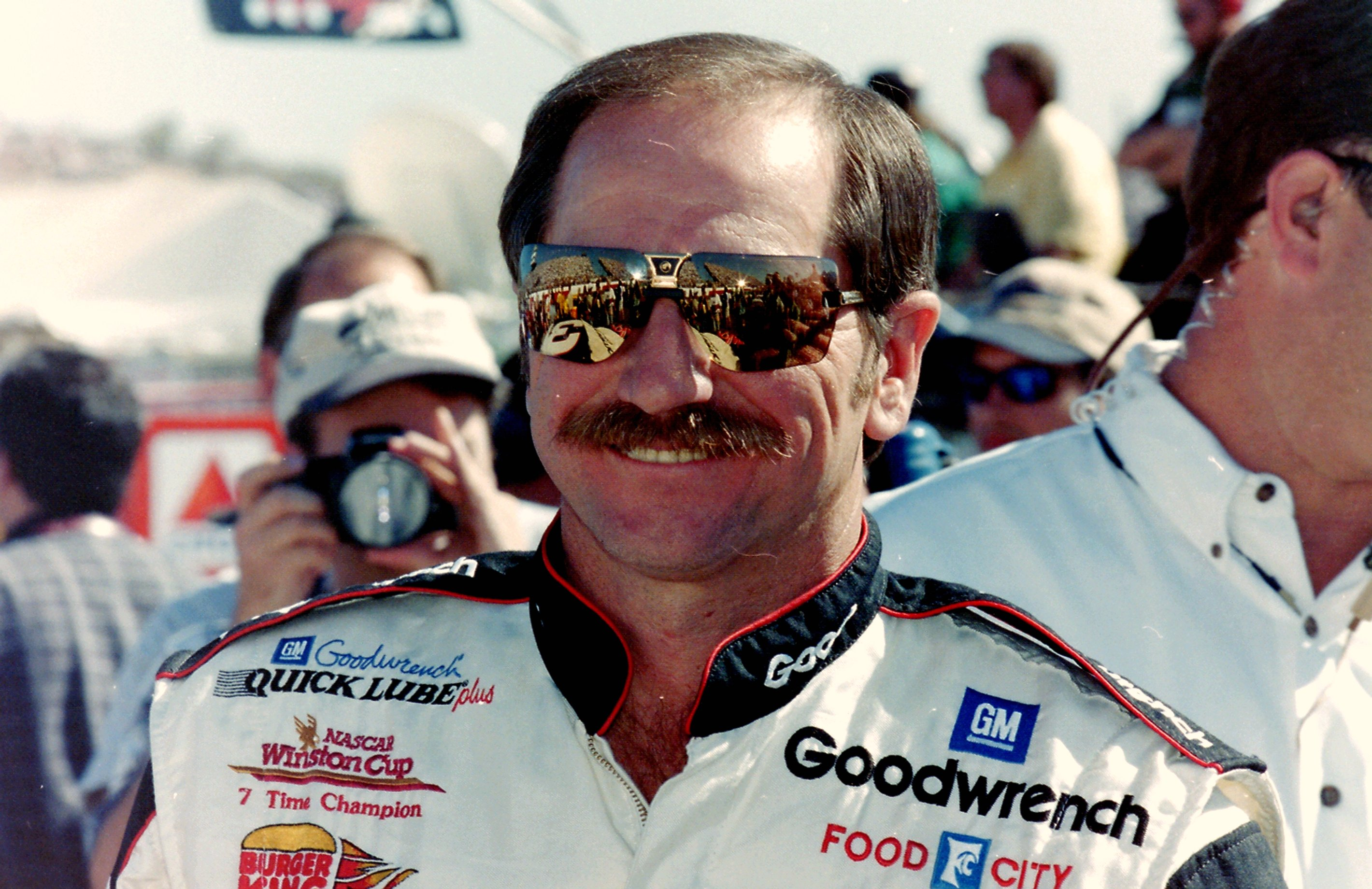
Earnhardt at Phoenix International Raceway before the start of the 1997 Dura Lube 500

In 1997, Earnhardt went winless for only the second time in his career. The only (non-points) win came during Speedweeks at Daytona in the Twin 125-mile qualifying race, his record eighth-straight win in the event. Once again in the hunt for the Daytona 500 with ten laps to go, Earnhardt was taken out of contention by a late crash which sent his car upside down on the backstretch. He hit the low point of his year when he blacked out early in the Mountain Dew Southern 500 at Darlington in September, causing him to hit the wall. Afterward, he was disoriented, and it took several laps before he could find his pit stall. When asked, Earnhardt complained of double vision which made it difficult to pit. Mike Dillon (Richard Childress's son-in-law) was brought in to relieve Earnhardt for the remainder of the race. Earnhardt was evaluated at a local hospital and cleared to race the next week, but the cause of the blackout and double vision was never determined. Despite no wins, Earnhardt finished the season fifth in the final standings with seven top-fives and sixteen top-tens, with an average finish of 12.1.

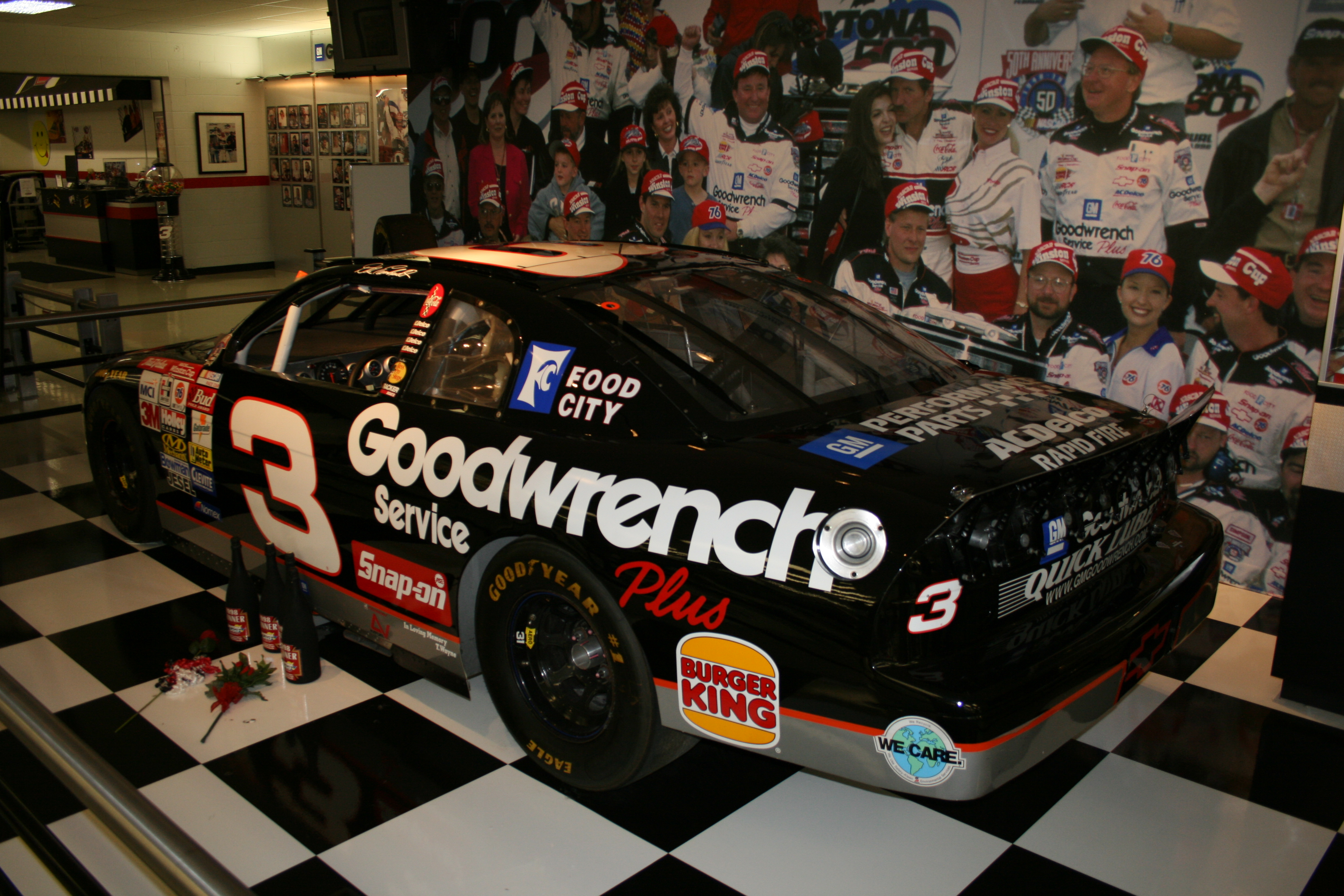
Earnhardt's 1998 Daytona 500–winning No. 3 Goodwrench Chevrolet Monte Carlo

On February 15, 1998, Earnhardt finally won the Daytona 500 in his 20th attempt after failing to win in his previous 19 attempts. He began the season by winning his Twin 125-mile qualifier race for the ninth straight year, and the week before was the first to drive around the track under the newly installed lights, for coincidentally twenty laps. On race day, he showed himself to be a contender early. Halfway through the race, however, it seemed that Jeff Gordon had the upper hand. But by lap 138, Earnhardt had taken the lead and thanks to a push by teammate Mike Skinner, he maintained it. Earnhardt made it to the caution-checkered flag before Bobby Labonte. Afterwards, there was a large show of respect for Earnhardt, in which every crew member of every team lined pit road to shake his hand as he made his way to victory lane. Earnhardt then drove his No. 3 into the infield grass, starting a trend of post-race celebrations. He spun the car twice, throwing grass and leaving tire tracks in the shape of a No. 3 in the grass. He then spoke about the victory, saying, "I have had a lot of great fans and people behind me all through the years and I just can't thank them enough. The Daytona 500 is ours. We won it, we won it, we won it!" The rest of the season did not go as well, and the Daytona 500 was his only victory that year. Despite that, he did almost pull off a Daytona sweep, where he was one of the contenders for the win in the first nighttime Pepsi 400, but a pit stop late in the race in which a rogue tire cost him the race win. He slipped to 12th in the point standings halfway through the season, and Richard Childress decided to make a crew chief change, taking Mike Skinner's crew chief Kevin Hamlin and putting him with Earnhardt while giving Skinner Larry McReynolds (Earnhardt's crew chief). Earnhardt finished the 1998 season eighth in the final points standings, with one win, five top-fives, and 13 top-tens, with an average finish of 16.2.

Before the 1999 season, fans began discussing Earnhardt's age and speculating that with his son, Dale Jr., making his Winston Cup debut, Earnhardt might be contemplating retirement. Earnhardt swept both races for the year at Talladega, leading some to conclude that his talent had become limited to the restrictor plate tracks, which require a unique skill set and an exceptionally powerful racecar to win. But halfway through the year, Earnhardt began to show some of the old spark. In the August race at Michigan, he led laps late in the race and nearly pulled off his first win on a non-restrictor-plate track since 1996. One week later, he provided NASCAR with one of its most controversial moments. At the Bristol night race, Earnhardt found himself in contention to win his first short track race since Martinsville in 1995. When a caution came out with fifteen laps to go, leader Terry Labonte got hit from behind by the lapped car of Darrell Waltrip. His spin put Earnhardt in the lead with five cars between him and Labonte with five laps to go. Labonte had four fresh tires, and Earnhardt was driving on old tires, which made Earnhardt's car considerably slower. Labonte caught Earnhardt and passed him coming to the white flag, but Earnhardt drove hard into turn two, bumping Labonte and spinning him around. Earnhardt collected the win while spectators booed and made obscene gestures. "I didn't mean to turn him around, I just wanted to rattle his cage," Earnhardt said of the incident. He finished seventh in the standings that year, with three wins, seven top-fives, and 21 top-tens, with an average finish of 12.0.

==== 2000 ====
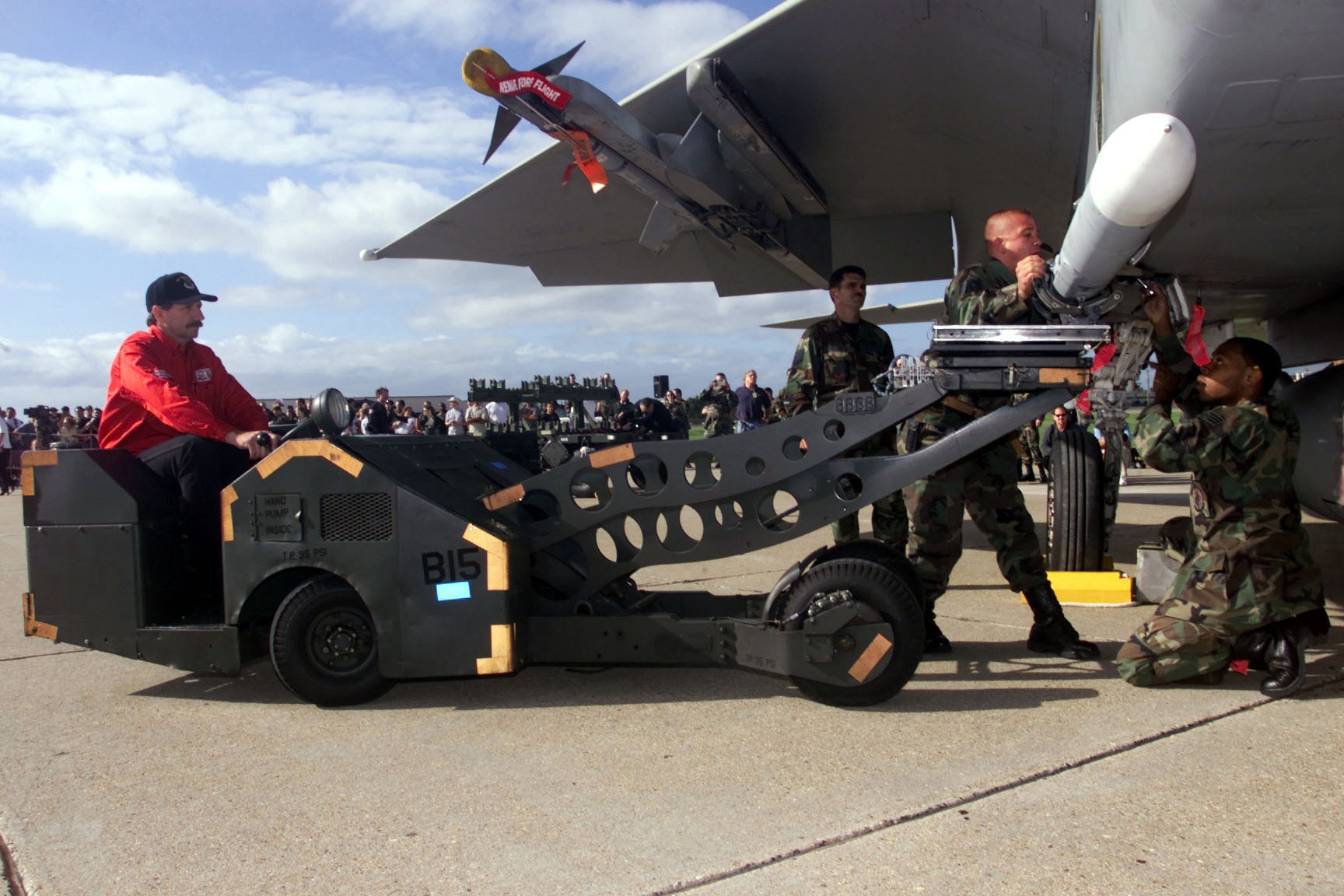
As part of a Winston No Bull 5 fan contest, Earnhardt drove a Bomb Lift Truck and attempts to load an AIM-120 advanced medium-range air-to-air missile (AMRAAM) missile as he competes in a load crew competition at Langley Air Force Base, Virginia, September 2000. Coincidentally, this position on a load crew is known unofficially as "Jammer Driver" or officially as Number 3 man.

In the 2000 season, Earnhardt had a resurgence, which was commonly attributed to neck surgery he underwent to correct a lingering injury from his 1996 Talladega crash. He scored what were considered the two most exciting wins of the year—winning by 0.010 seconds over Bobby Labonte at Atlanta, then gaining seventeen positions in the final four laps to win at Talladega, claiming his only No Bull million-dollar bonus along with his record tenth win at the track. Earnhardt also had second-place runs at Richmond and Martinsville, tracks where he had struggled through the late 1990s. On the strength of those performances, Earnhardt got to second in the standings. However, poor performances at the road course of Watkins Glen, where he wrecked coming out of the chicane, a wreck with Kenny Irwin Jr. while leading the spring race at Bristol, and mid-pack runs at intermediate tracks like Charlotte and Dover in a season dominated by the Ford Taurus in those tracks from Roush, Yates, and Penske, coupled with Bobby Labonte's extreme consistency, denied Earnhardt an eighth championship title. Earnhardt finished 2000 with two wins, thirteen top-fives, 24 top-tens, an average finish of 9.4, and was the only driver besides Labonte to finish the season with zero DNF's.

== Death ==
During the Daytona 500 at Daytona International Speedway on February 18, 2001, Earnhardt was killed in a three-car crash on the final lap of the race. He collided with Ken Schrader after making small contact with Sterling Marlin and hit the outside wall head-on. He had been blocking Schrader on the outside and Marlin on the inside at the time of the crash. Earnhardt's and Schrader's cars both slid off the track's asphalt banking into the infield grass just inside of turn 4. Seconds later, his driver Michael Waltrip won the race, with Waltrip's teammate and Earnhardt's son Dale Earnhardt Jr. finishing second. Earnhardt was pronounced dead at the Halifax Medical Center at 5:16 pm Eastern Standard Time (22:16 UTC); he was 49 years old. NASCAR president Mike Helton confirmed Earnhardt's death in a statement to the press. An autopsy conducted on February 19, 2001, concluded that Earnhardt sustained a fatal basilar skull fracture. Four days later, on February 22, public funeral services for Earnhardt were held at the Calvary Church in Charlotte, North Carolina.

=== Aftermath ===
Several press conferences were held in the days following Earnhardt's death. After driver Sterling Marlin and his relatives received hate mail and death threats from angry fans, Waltrip and Earnhardt Jr. absolved him of any responsibility.

The Daytona Beach Police Department and NASCAR opened two investigations about the crash; nearly every detail of the crash was made public. The allegations of seatbelt failure resulted in Bill Simpson's resignation from the company bearing his name, which manufactured the seatbelts used in Earnhardt's car and nearly every other NASCAR driver's car. In October 2001, NASCAR mandated drivers from its three national series to use the HANS device, which Earnhardt had refused to wear after finding it restrictive and uncomfortable.

Team owner Richard Childress made a public pledge that the number 3 would never again adorn the side of a black race car with a GM Goodwrench sponsorship, and the car was re-numbered as the #29. Childress's second-year Busch Series driver Kevin Harvick was named as Earnhardt's replacement, beginning with the 2001 Dura Lube 400 at North Carolina Speedway. Special pennants bearing the No. 3 were distributed to everyone at the track to honor Earnhardt, and the Childress team wore blank uniforms out of respect, something which disappeared quickly and was soon replaced by the previous GM Goodwrench Service Plus uniforms.

Harvick's car always displayed the Earnhardt stylized number 3 on the "B" posts (metal portion on each side of the car to the rear of the front windows) above the number 29 until the end of 2013, when he departed for Stewart–Haas Racing. The number 3 returned for the 2014 season, this time not sponsored by GM Goodwrench (which was rebranded GM Certified Service in 2011), driven by Childress's grandson Austin Dillon.

Fans began honoring Earnhardt by holding three fingers aloft on the third lap of every race, a black screen of No. 3 in the beginning of NASCAR Thunder 2002 before the EA Sports logo, and the television coverage of NASCAR on Fox and NASCAR on NBC went silent for each third lap from Rockingham to the following year's race there in honor of Earnhardt, unless on-track incidents brought out the caution flag on the third lap. Three weeks after Earnhardt's death, Harvick, driving a car that had been prepared for Earnhardt, scored his first career Cup win at Atlanta. On the final lap of the 2001 Cracker Barrel Old Country Store 500, he beat Jeff Gordon by .006 seconds (the margin being 0.004 of a second closer than Earnhardt had won over Bobby Labonte at the same race a year ago) in an identical photo finish, and the images of Earnhardt's longtime gas man Danny "Chocolate" Myers crying after the victory, Harvick's tire-smoking burnout on the front stretch with three fingers held aloft outside the driver's window. Harvick would win another race at the inaugural event at Chicagoland en route to a ninth-place finish in the final points and won Rookie of the Year honors along with the 2001 NASCAR Busch Series Championship.

Dale Earnhardt, Inc. won five races in the 2001 season, beginning with Steve Park's victory in the race at Rockingham just one week after Earnhardt's death. Earnhardt Jr. and Waltrip finished first and second in the series' return to Daytona in July for the Pepsi 400, a reverse of the finish in the Daytona 500. Earnhardt Jr. also won the fall races at Dover (first post 9/11 race) and Talladega and came to an eighth-place points finish.

Earnhardt's remains were interred at his estate in Mooresville, North Carolina after a private funeral service on February 21, 2001.

== No. 3 car ==
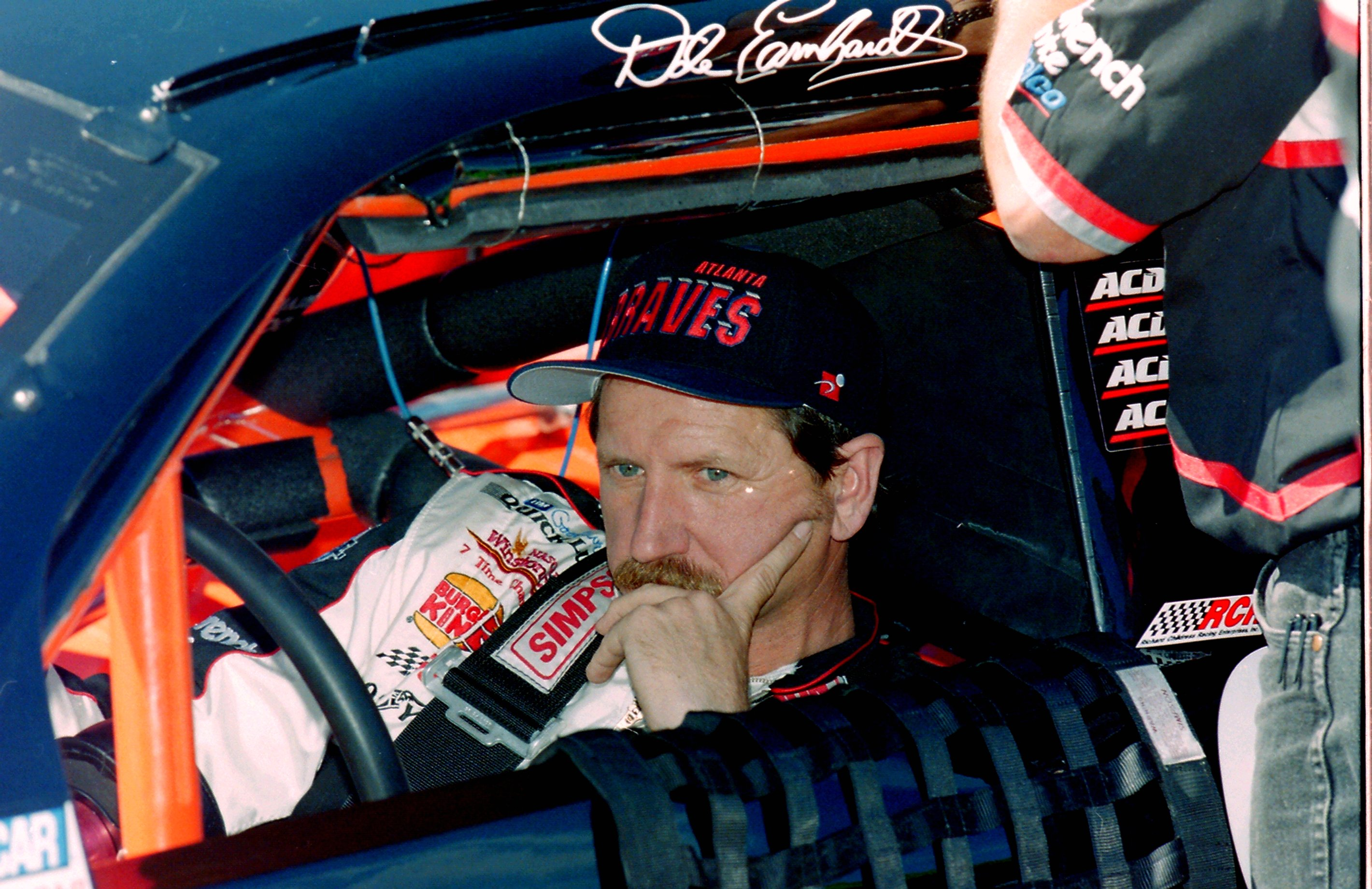
Earnhardt in the No. 3 car

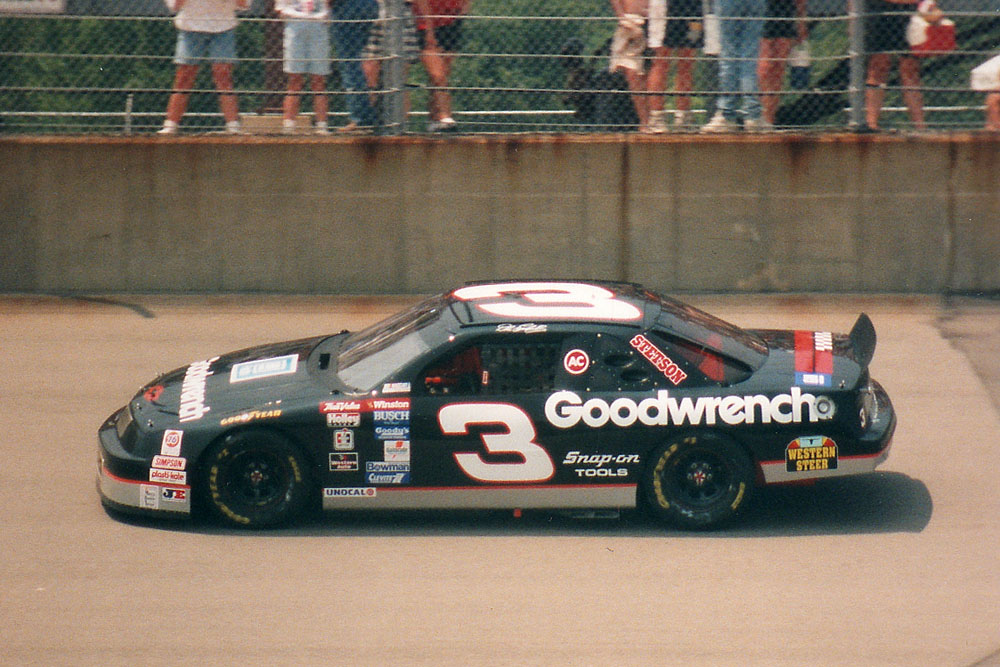
The No. 3 car

Earnhardt drove the No. 3 car for the majority of his career, spanning the latter half of the 1981 season, and then again from 1984 until his death in 2001. Although he had other sponsors during his career, his No. 3 is associated in fans' minds with his last sponsor GM Goodwrench and his last color scheme — a predominantly black car with bold red and silver trim. The black and red No. 3 continues to be one of the most famous logos in North American motor racing. Earnhardt's earlier Wrangler paint scheme, including the stylized number 3, was designed by motorsports artist Kenny Youngblood.

A common misconception was that Richard Childress Racing "owned the rights" to the No. 3 in NASCAR competition (fueled by the fact that Kevin Harvick's car had a little No. 3 as an homage to Earnhardt from 2001 to 2013 and the usage of the No. 3 on the Camping World Truck Series truck of Ty Dillon when he ran in that series), but NASCAR, and no specific team, owns the rights to this or any other number. According to established NASCAR procedures, Richard Childress Racing had priority over other teams if they chose to reuse the number, which they did when Austin Dillon was promoted to the Cup series in 2014. While Richard Childress Racing owns the stylized No. 3 logos used during Earnhardt's lifetime (and used presently with Dillon), those rights would hypothetically not prevent a future racing team from using a different No. 3 design (also, a new No. 3 team would most likely, in any case, need to create logos which fit with their sponsor's logos).

In 2004, ESPN released a made-for-TV movie entitled 3: The Dale Earnhardt Story, which used a new (but similarly colored) No. 3 logo. The movie was a sympathetic portrayal of Earnhardt's life, but the producers were sued for using the No. 3 logo. In December 2006, the ESPN lawsuit was settled, but details were not released to the public.

Dale Earnhardt Jr. made two special appearances in 2002 in a No. 3 Busch Series car: these appearances were at the track where his father died (Daytona) and the track where he made his first Winston Cup start (Charlotte). Earnhardt Jr. won the first of those two races, which was the season-opening event at Daytona. He also raced a No. 3 sponsored by Wrangler on July 2, 2010, for Richard Childress Racing at Daytona. In a green-white-checker finish he outran Joey Logano to win his second race in the No. 3.

Otherwise, the No. 3 was missing from the national touring series until September 5, 2009, when Austin Dillon, the 19-year-old grandson of Richard Childress, debuted an RCR-owned No. 3 truck in the Camping World Truck Series. Dillon and his younger brother Ty Dillon drove the No. 3 in various lower level competitions for several years, including the Camping World East Series. In 2012, Austin Dillon began driving in the Nationwide Series full-time, using the No. 3; he had previously used the No. 33 while driving in that series part-time.

Richard Childress Racing entered a No. 3 in the Daytona truck race on February 13, 2010, with sponsorship from Bass Pro Shops driven by Austin Dillon. It was involved in a wreck almost identical to that which took the life of Earnhardt: being spun out, colliding with another vehicle, and being turned into the outside wall in turn number four. Dillon again returned to a No. 3 marked racecar when he started fifth in the 2012 Daytona Nationwide Series opener in an Advocare-sponsored black Chevrolet Impala. On December 11, 2013, RCR announced that Austin Dillon would drive the No. 3 car in the upcoming 2014 Sprint Cup season, bringing the number back to the series for the first time in 13 years.

Only the former International Race of Champions actually retired the No. 3, which they did in a rule change effective in 2004. Until the series folded in 2007, anyone wishing to use the No. 3 again had to use No. 03 instead.

When Formula One's rules changed to allow drivers to choose their own numbers for 2014, Australian driver Daniel Ricciardo chose the number 3 as his permanent racing number and stated on Twitter that his choice was partly due to him being a fan of Earnhardt's, while his helmet design features the number stylized in the same way.

== Legacy ==
Earnhardt Tower, a seating section at Daytona International Speedway, was opened and named in his honor a month before his death at the track.

In 2002 the Dale Earnhardt Plaza was erected in his hometown of Kannapolis, North Carolina. The centerpiece is a 9-foot, 900-pound bronze statue of Earnhardt, and the plaza also features a granite monument. That same year The Dale Earnhardt Foundation was founded with a mission to continue the legacy of Earnhardt through charitable programs and grants reflecting Earnhardt's commitments to children, education and environment and wildlife preservation.

Earnhardt has several roads named after him, including a street in his hometown Kannapolis. Dale Earnhardt Boulevard (originally Earnhardt Road) is marked as exit 60 off Interstate 85 in North Carolina, northeast of Charlotte. Dale Earnhardt Drive is also the start of The Dale Journey Trail, a self-guided driving tour of landmarks in the lives of Earnhardt and his family. The North Carolina Department of Transportation switched the designation of a road between Kannapolis and Mooresville near the headquarters of DEI (that used to be called NC 136) with NC 3, which was in Currituck County. In addition, exit 72 off Interstate 35W, one of the entrances to Texas Motor Speedway, is named "Dale Earnhardt Way".

Between the 2004 and 2005 JGTC (renamed Super GT from 2005) season, Hasemi Sport competed in the series with a sole black G'Zox-sponsored Nissan 350Z with the same number and letterset as Earnhardt on the roof.

During the NASCAR weekend races at Talladega Superspeedway on April 29, 2006 – May 1, 2006, the DEI cars competed in identical special black paint schemes on Dale Earnhardt Day, which is held annually on his birthday—April 29. Martin Truex Jr., won the Aaron's 312 in the black car, painted to reflect Earnhardt's Intimidating Black No. 3 NASCAR Busch Grand National series car. In the Nextel Cup race on May 1, No. 8 Dale Earnhardt Jr.; No. 1 Martin Truex Jr.; and No. 15 Paul Menard competed in cars with the same type of paint scheme.

On June 18, 2006, at Michigan for the 3M Performance 400, Earnhardt Jr. ran a special vintage Budweiser car to honor his father and his grandfather Ralph Earnhardt. He finished third after rain caused the race to be cut short. The car was painted to resemble Ralph's 1956 dirt cars, and carried 1956-era Budweiser logos to complete the throwback look.

In the summer of 2007, Dale Earnhardt, Inc. (DEI) with the Dale Earnhardt Foundation, announced it would fund an annual undergraduate scholarship at Clemson University in Clemson, South Carolina, for students interested in motorsports and automotive engineering. Scholarship winners are also eligible to work at DEI in internships. The first winner was William Bostic, a senior at Clemson majoring in mechanical engineering.

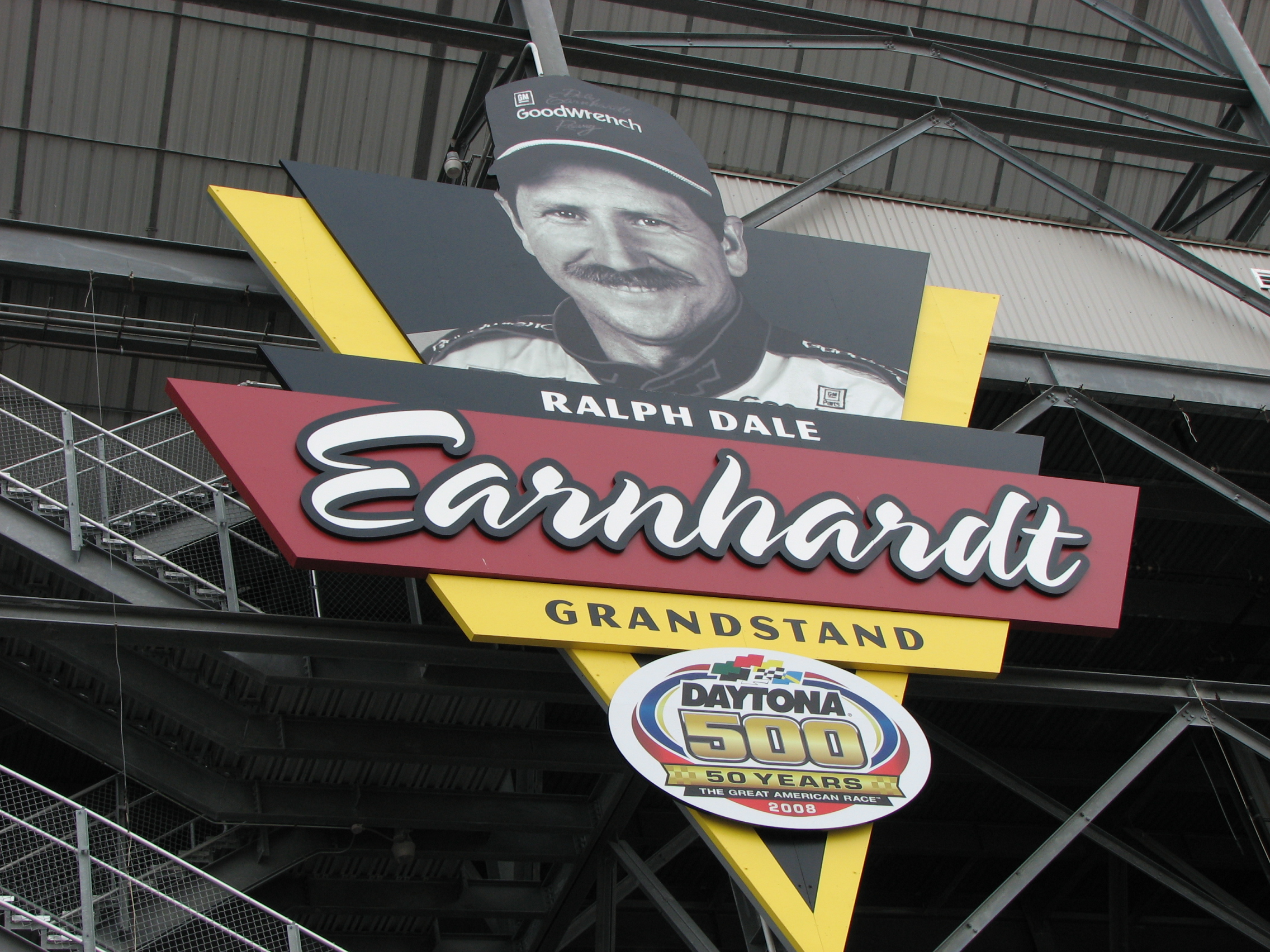
The former Earnhardt Grandstand at Daytona International Speedway

In 2008, on the 50th anniversary of the first Daytona 500 race, DEI and RCR teamed up to make a special COT sporting Earnhardt's 1998 Daytona 500 paint scheme to honor the tenth anniversary of his Daytona 500 victory. In a tribute to all previous Daytona 500 winners, the winning drivers appeared in a lineup on stage, in chronological order. The throwback No. 3 car stood in the infield, in the approximate position Earnhardt would have taken in the processional. The throwback car featured the authentic 1998-era design on a current-era car, a concept similar to modern throwback jerseys in other sports. The car was later sold in 1:64 and 1:24 scale models.

In 2010, the Intimidator 305 roller coaster opened at Kings Dominion in Doswell, Virginia. Named after Earnhardt, the ride's trains were modeled after his black-and-red Chevrolet. Another Intimidator coaster also opened at Carowinds in North Carolina the same year. Both were themed to Earnhardt's legacy, featuring signs, flags, various artwork, as well as replicas of the cars he drove at each location. The "Intimidator" name and all Earnhardt branding were removed from both rides in 2024 as a result of an expiring licensing agreement.

Atlanta Braves assistant coach Ned Yost was a friend of Earnhardt, and Richard Childress. When Yost was named Milwaukee Brewers manager, he changed jersey numbers, from No. 5 to No. 3 in Earnhardt's honor. (No. 3 is retired by the Braves in honor of outfielder Dale Murphy, so Yost could not make the change while in Atlanta.) When Yost was named Kansas City Royals assistant coach, he wore No. 2 for the 2010 season, even when he was named manager in May 2010, but for the 2011 season, he switched back to No. 3.

During the third lap of the 2011 Daytona 500 (a decade since Earnhardt's death), and 2021 Daytona 500 (two decades since Earnhardt's death) the commentators on FOX fell silent while fans raised three fingers in a similar fashion to the tributes throughout 2001.

The north entrance to New Avondale City Center in Arizona will bear the name Dale Earnhardt Drive. Avondale is where Earnhardt won a Cup race in 1990.

His helmet from the 1998 season is at the National Museum of American History in the Smithsonian museum in Washington D.C.

On February 28, 2016, after winning the Folds of Honor QuikTrip 500 at Atlanta Motor Speedway, during his victory lap, driver Jimmie Johnson held his hand out of his window, with three fingers extended in tribute to Earnhardt. This was following Johnson's 76th Cup Series win, which tied the career mark of Earnhardt's. This is also the track where Earnhardt claimed his sixth Winston Cup Series title.

In the week of the 2021 United States Grand Prix, McLaren driver Daniel Ricciardo drove the iconic Wrangler car from 1984 as Ricciardo has been a fan of Earnhardt since he was a child. The opportunity came after he won the Italian Grand Prix that year, and McLaren CEO Zak Brown, who owns the car, promised him that he would give him a chance to drive it.

== Media ==
Earnhardt appeared as himself in the movie Stroker Ace in 1983.

He also voiced himself in King of the Hill in the episode titled "Life in the Fast Lane, Bobby's Saga".

He appeared as himself in an episode of Arli$$ in 1998.

He had a cameo in the movie BASEketball in 1998.

His life story was made into a movie by ESPN in 2004 entitled 3: The Dale Earnhardt Story.

Paul Newman narrated a documentary on Earnhardt's life entitled Dale, which premiered in 2007.

In 2025, Amazon released a four part docuseries titled Earnhardt.

Weedeater, a sludge metal band from North Carolina, paid tribute to Earnhardt on their 2003 album Sixteen Tons with the song "No. 3". The song is played with audio clips from television broadcasts about Earnhardt mixed in the background.

Eminem rapped about Dale in his song "Rap God", with the lyrics "The way I'm racin' around the track, call me NASCAR, NASCAR Dale Earnhardt of the trailer park, the White Trash God".

John Hiatt sang about Dale in his song "The Tiki Bar Is Open", singing "Well his name was Mr. Dale Earnhardt/And he drove the black number three/Now the king is gone but he'll not be forgotten/Nor his like will we ever see".

In 2025, country singer Morgan Wallen released "Number 3 and Number 7", featuring Eric Church, on his album I'm the Problem. The song references Earnhardt and his No. 3 race car as a metaphor for speed and youthful recklessness, with the narrator describing himself as "puttin' Earnhardt to shame" before a drunk-driving crash. Earnhardt's son, Dale Earnhardt Jr., said he appreciated the reference as an example of his father's legacy continuing to influence younger generations.

== Awards ==
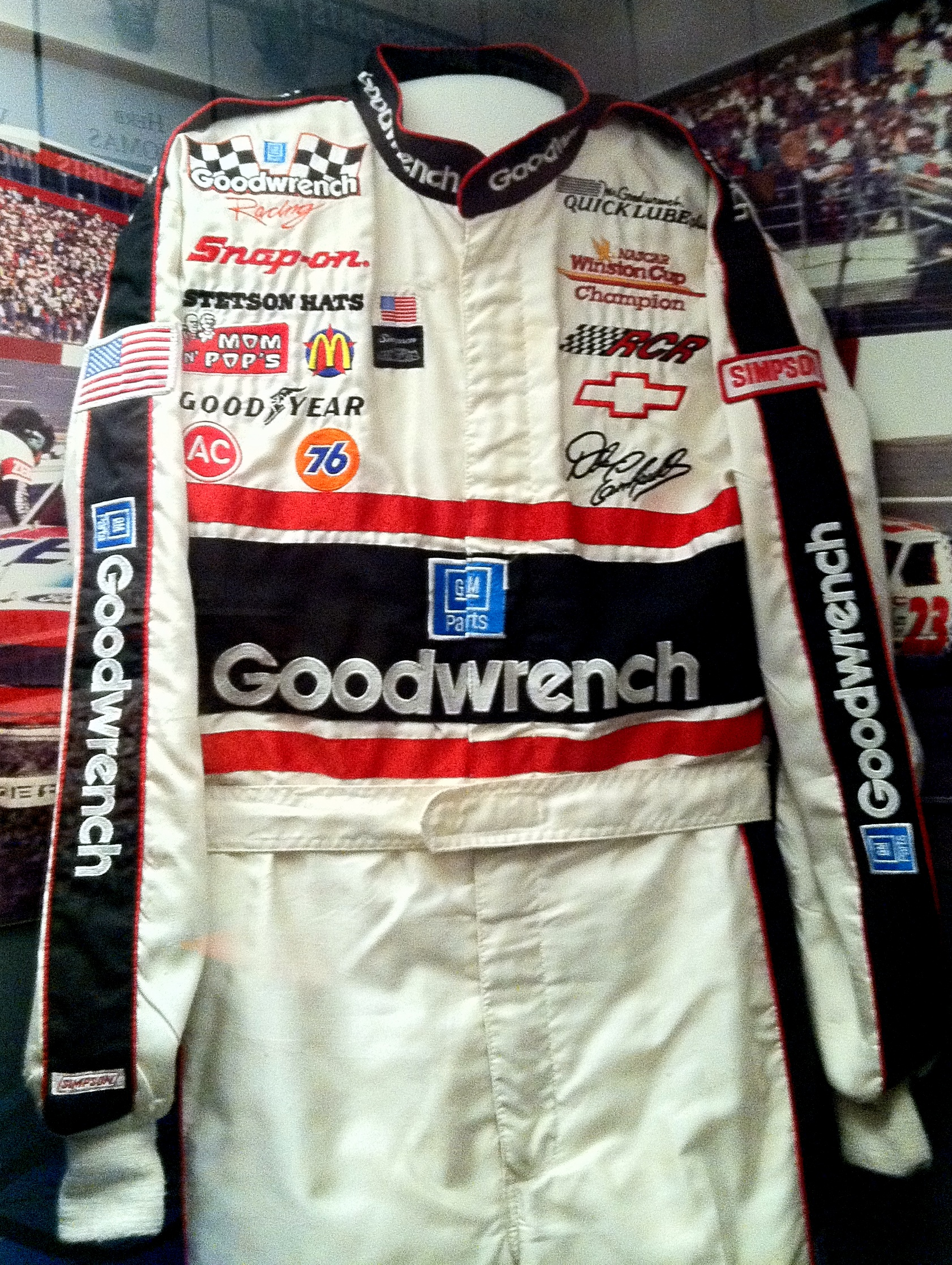
Earnhardt's suit on display at the North Carolina Sports Hall of Fame

- He was awarded the Order of the Long Leaf Pine by North Carolina Governor Jim Hunt in 1994.
- He was inducted into the North Carolina Sports Hall of Fame in 1994.
- Earnhardt was named one of NASCAR's 50 Greatest Drivers in 1998.
- Earnhardt was posthumously named "NASCAR's Most Popular Driver" in 2001. This was the only time he received the award.
- He was posthumously inducted into the Motorsports Hall of Fame of America in 2002, a year after his death.
- He was posthumously inducted in the Oceanside Rotary Club Stock Car Racing Hall of Fame at Daytona Beach in 2004.
- He was posthumously inducted into the North Carolina Auto Racing Hall of Fame in 2004.
- He was posthumously inducted in the International Motorsports Hall of Fame in 2006.
- Earnhardt was named first on ESPN's list of "NASCAR's 20 Greatest Drivers" in 2007 in front of Richard Petty.
- He was posthumously inducted into the Automotive Hall of Fame in 2006.
- He was posthumously inducted in the Inaugural Class of the NASCAR Hall of Fame on May 23, 2010.
- He was posthumously inducted into the Indianapolis Motor Speedway Hall of Fame in 2020.
- Earnhardt was named one of Nascar's 75 greatest drivers in 2023.

== Motorsports career results ==
=== NASCAR ===
(key) (Bold – Pole position awarded by qualifying time. Italics – Pole position earned by points standings or practice time. * – Most laps led.)

==== Winston Cup Series ====
NASCAR Winston Cup Series results
Year	Team	No.	Make	1	2	3	4	5	6	7	8	9	10	11	12	13	14	15	16	17	18	19	20	21	22	23	24	25	26	27	28	29	30	31	32	33	34	35	36	NWCC	Pts	Ref
1975	Negre Racing	8	Dodge	RSD	DAY	RCH	CAR	BRI	ATL	NWS	DAR	MAR	TAL	NSV	DOV	CLT; 22	RSD	MCH	DAY	NSV	POC	TAL	MCH	DAR	DOV	NWS	MAR	CLT	RCH	CAR	BRI	ATL	ONT							NA	0	
1976	Ballard Racing	30	Chevy	RSD	DAY	CAR	RCH	BRI	ATL	NWS	DAR	MAR	TAL	NSV	DOV	CLT; 31	RSD	MCH	DAY	NSV	POC	TAL	MCH	BRI	DAR	RCH	DOV	MAR	NWS	CLT	CAR									103rd	70	
1976	Johnny Ray	77	Chevy																													ATL; 19	ONT							103rd	70	
1977	Gray Racing	19	Chevy	RSD	DAY	RCH	CAR	ATL	NWS	DAR	BRI	MAR	TAL	NSV	DOV	CLT	RSD	MCH	DAY	NSV	POC	TAL	MCH	BRI	DAR	RCH	DOV	MAR	NWS	CLT; 38	CAR	ATL	ONT							118th	49	
1978	Cronkrite Racing	96	Ford	RSD	DAY	RCH	CAR	ATL	BRI	DAR	NWS	MAR	TAL	DOV	CLT; 17	NSV	RSD	MCH	DAY; 7	NSV	POC	TAL; 12	MCH	BRI	DAR; 16	RCH	DOV	MAR	NWS	CLT	CAR									43rd	558	
1978	Osterlund Racing	98	Chevy																													ATL; 4	ONT							43rd	558	
1979	Osterlund Racing	2	Chevy	RSD; 21		CAR; 12	RCH; 13		NWS; 4	BRI; 1*	DAR; 23	MAR; 8		NSV; 4	DOV; 5	CLT; 3	TWS; 12	**RSD**; 13	MCH; 6		NSV; 3	POC; 29	TAL	MCH	BRI	DAR	**RCH**; 4	**DOV**; 9	MAR; 29	CLT; 10	**NWS**; 4	CAR; 5	ATL; 2	ONT; 9						7th	3749	
1979	Osterlund Racing	2	Buick		DAY; 8			ATL; 12					TAL; 36																											7th	3749	
1979	Osterlund Racing	2	Olds																	DAY; 3																				7th	3749	
1980	Osterlund Racing	2	Chevy	RSD; 2		RCH; 5	CAR; 3	ATL; 1	BRI; 1*	DAR; 29	NWS; 6	MAR; 13		NSV; 6	DOV; 10	CLT; 20	TWS; 9	RSD; 5	MCH; 12	DAY; 3	NSV; 1	POC; 4		MCH; 35	BRI; 2	DAR; 7	RCH; 4	DOV; 34	NWS; 5	MAR; 1*	CLT; 1*	CAR; 18	ATL; 3	ONT; 5						1st	4661	
1980	Osterlund Racing	2	Olds		DAY; 4								TAL; 2										TAL; 3																	1st	4661	
1981	Osterlund Racing	2	Pontiac	RSD; 3	DAY; 5	RCH; 7	CAR; 26	ATL; 3	BRI; 28	NWS; 10	DAR; 17	MAR; 25	TAL; 8	NSV; 20	DOV; 3	CLT; 18	TWS; 2*	RSD; 2	MCH; 5																					7th	3975	
1981	Jim Stacy Racing	2	Pontiac																	DAY; 35	NSV; 7	POC; 11	TAL; 29																	7th	3975	
1981	Richard Childress Racing	3	Pontiac																					MCH; 9	BRI; 27	DAR; 6	RCH; 6	DOV; 15	MAR; 26	NWS; 4	CLT; 25	CAR; 9	ATL; 24	RSD; 4						7th	3975	
1982	Bud Moore Engineering	15	Ford	DAY; 36	RCH; 4	BRI; 2*	**ATL**; 28*	CAR; 25	DAR; 1*	NWS; 3	MAR; 23	TAL; 8	NSV; 10	DOV; 3	CLT; 30*	POC; 34	RSD; 4	MCH; 7	DAY; 29	NSV; 9	POC; 25	TAL; 35	MCH; 30	BRI; 6	DAR; 3	RCH; 27	DOV; 20	NWS; 20	CLT; 25	MAR; 27	CAR; 14	ATL; 34	RSD; 42							12th	3402	
1983	Bud Moore Engineering	15	Ford	DAY; 35	RCH; 2	CAR; 33	ATL; 33	DAR; 13	NWS; 29	MAR; 26	TAL; 24	NSV; 24	DOV; 8	BRI; 9	CLT; 5	RSD; 4	POC; 8	MCH; 15	DAY; 9	NSV; 1*	POC; 30	TAL; 1*	MCH; 7	BRI; 2	DAR; 11	RCH; 22	DOV; 35	MAR; 4	NWS; 2	CLT; 14	CAR; 17	ATL; 33	RSD; 4							8th	3732	
1984	Richard Childress Racing	3	Chevy	DAY; 2	RCH; 6	CAR; 14	ATL; 2	BRI; 7	NWS; 8	DAR; 5	MAR; 9	TAL; 27	NSV; 19	DOV; 5	CLT; 2	RSD; 5	POC; 8	MCH; 2	DAY; 8	NSV; 3	POC; 10	TAL; 1	MCH; 7	BRI; 10	DAR; 38	RCH; 3	DOV; 5	MAR; 12	CLT; 39	NWS; 7	CAR; 13	ATL; 1	RSD; 11							4th	4265	
1985	Richard Childress Racing	3	Chevy	DAY; 32	RCH; 1	CAR; 10	ATL; 9	BRI; 1*	DAR; 24	NWS; 8	MAR; 25	TAL; 21	DOV; 25	CLT; 4*	RSD; 40	POC; 39	MCH; 5	DAY; 9	POC; 39	TAL; 24	MCH; 22	**BRI**; 1*	DAR; 19*	RCH; 4	DOV; 7	MAR; 1	NWS; 4	CLT; 20	CAR; 8	ATL; 4	RSD; 5									8th	3561	
1986	Richard Childress Racing	3	Chevy	DAY; 14	RCH; 3*	CAR; 8	**ATL**; 2*	BRI; 10	DAR; 1*	NWS; 1*	MAR; 21	TAL; 2	DOV; 3	CLT; 1	RSD; 5	POC; 2	MCH; 6	DAY; 27*	POC; 7	TAL; 26*	GLN; 3	MCH; 5	BRI; 4	DAR; 9	RCH; 2	DOV; 21	MAR; 12	NWS; 9	CLT; 1	CAR; 6	ATL; 1*	RSD; 2								1st	4468	
1987	Richard Childress Racing	3	Chevy	DAY; 5	CAR; 1*	RCH; 1*	**ATL**; 16*	DAR; 1*	NWS; 1*	BRI; 1	MAR; 1*	TAL; 4	CLT; 20	DOV; 4	POC; 5	RSD; 7	MCH; 1*	DAY; 6	POC; 1*	TAL; 3	GLN; 8	MCH; 2*	BRI; 1*	DAR; 1*	RCH; 1*	DOV; 31	MAR; 2*	NWS; 2	CLT; 12	CAR; 2	RSD; 30	ATL; 2								1st	4696	
1988	Richard Childress Racing	3	Chevy	DAY; 10	RCH; 10*	CAR; 5	ATL; 1*	DAR; 11	BRI; 14	NWS; 3*	MAR; 1*	TAL; 9	CLT; 13	DOV; 16	RSD; 4	POC; 33	MCH; 4	DAY; 4*	POC; 11	TAL; 3	GLN; 6	MCH; 29	BRI; 1*	DAR; 3	RCH; 2	DOV; 2	MAR; 8	CLT; 17*	NWS; 6	CAR; 5	PHO; 11	ATL; 14								3rd	4256	
1989	Richard Childress Racing	3	Chevy	DAY; 3	CAR; 3	ATL; 2	RCH; 3	DAR; 33	BRI; 16	NWS; 1*	MAR; 2	TAL; 8	CLT; 38	DOV; 1*	SON; 4	POC; 3	MCH; 17	DAY; 18	POC; 9	TAL; 11	GLN; 3	MCH; 17	BRI; 14	DAR; 1*	RCH; 2	DOV; 1*	MAR; 9	CLT; 42	NWS; 10*	CAR; 20	PHO; 6	ATL; 1*								2nd	4164	
1990	Richard Childress Racing	3	Chevy	DAY; 5*	RCH; 2	CAR; 10	ATL; 1*	DAR; 1	BRI; 19	NWS; 3	MAR; 5	TAL; 1*	CLT; 30	DOV; 31	SON; 34	POC; 13	MCH; 1	DAY; 1*	POC; 4	**TAL**; 1*	**GLN**; 7	MCH; 8	**BRI**; 8*	**DAR**; 1*	RCH; 1*	DOV; 3	MAR; 2	NWS; 2*	CLT; 25	CAR; 10	PHO; 1*	ATL; 3								1st	4430	
1991	Richard Childress Racing	3	Chevy	DAY; 5	RCH; 1	CAR; 8	ATL; 3	DAR; 29	BRI; 20	NWS; 2	MAR; 1*	TAL; 3*	CLT; 3	DOV; 2*	SON; 7	POC; 2	MCH; 4	DAY; 7	POC; 22	TAL; 1*	GLN; 15	MCH; 24	BRI; 7	DAR; 8	RCH; 11	DOV; 15	MAR; 3	NWS; 1	CLT; 25	CAR; 7	PHO; 9	ATL; 5								1st	4287	
1992	Richard Childress Racing	3	Chevy	DAY; 9	CAR; 24	RCH; 11	ATL; 3	DAR; 10	BRI; 18	NWS; 6	MAR; 9	TAL; 3	CLT; 1	DOV; 2	SON; 6	POC; 28	MCH; 9	DAY; 40	POC; 23	TAL; 40	**GLN**; 9	MCH; 16	BRI; 2	DAR; 29	RCH; 4	DOV; 21	MAR; 31	NWS; 19	CLT; 14	CAR; 8	PHO; 10	ATL; 26								12th	3574	
1993	Richard Childress Racing	3	Chevy	DAY; 2*	CAR; 2	RCH; 10	ATL; 11	DAR; 1*	BRI; 2	NWS; 16	MAR; 22	**TAL**; 4*	**SON**; 6*	CLT; 1*	DOV; 1*	POC; 11	MCH; 14	DAY; 1*	NHA; 26	POC; 1*	TAL; 1*	GLN; 18	MCH; 9	BRI; 3	DAR; 4	RCH; 3	DOV; 27	MAR; 29	NWS; 2	CLT; 3	CAR; 2	PHO; 4	ATL; 10							1st	4526	
1994	Richard Childress Racing	3	Chevy	DAY; 7	CAR; 7	RCH; 4	ATL; 12	DAR; 1*	BRI; 1*	NWS; 5	MAR; 11	TAL; 1	SON; 3	CLT; 9	DOV; 28	POC; 2	MCH; 2	**DAY**; 3	NHA; 2	POC; 7	**TAL**; 34	IND; 5	GLN; 3	MCH; 37	BRI; 3	DAR; 2	RCH; 3	DOV; 2	MAR; 2	NWS; 7	CLT; 3	CAR; 1*	PHO; 40	ATL; 2						1st	4694	
1995	Richard Childress Racing	3	Chevy	DAY; 2	CAR; 3	RCH; 2	**ATL**; 4	DAR; 2	BRI; 25	NWS; 1*	MAR; 29	TAL; 21	SON; 1	CLT; 6	DOV; 5	POC; 8	MCH; 35	**DAY**; 3	NHA; 22	POC; 20	TAL; 3	IND; 1	GLN; 23	MCH; 35	BRI; 2	DAR; 2*	**RCH**; 3	DOV; 5	MAR; 1*	NWS; 9	CLT; 2	CAR; 7	PHO; 3	ATL; 1*						2nd	4580	
1996	Richard Childress Racing	3	Chevy	**DAY**; 2	CAR; 1	RCH; 31	ATL; 1*	DAR; 14	BRI; 4	NWS; 3	MAR; 5	TAL; 3	SON; 4	CLT; 2	DOV; 3	POC; 32	MCH; 9	DAY; 4	NHA; 12	POC; 14	TAL; 28*	IND; 15	**GLN**; 6*	MCH; 17	BRI; 24	DAR; 12	RCH; 20	DOV; 16	MAR; 15	NWS; 2	CLT; 6	CAR; 9	PHO; 12	ATL; 4						4th	4327	
1997	Richard Childress Racing	3	Chevy	DAY; 31	CAR; 11	RCH; 25	ATL; 8	DAR; 15	TEX; 6	BRI; 6	MAR; 12	SON; 12	TAL; 2*	CLT; 7	DOV; 16	POC; 10	MCH; 7	CAL; 16	DAY; 4	NHA; 2	POC; 12	IND; 29	GLN; 16	MCH; 9	BRI; 14	DAR; 30	RCH; 15	NHA; 8	DOV; 2	MAR; 2	CLT; 3	TAL; 29	CAR; 8	PHO; 5	ATL; 16					5th	4216	
1998	Richard Childress Racing	3	Chevy	DAY; 1*	CAR; 17	LVS; 8	ATL; 13	DAR; 12	BRI; 22	TEX; 35	MAR; 4	TAL; 36	CAL; 9	CLT; 39	DOV; 25	RCH; 21	MCH; 15	POC; 8	SON; 11	NHA; 18	POC; 7	IND; 5	GLN; 11	MCH; 18	BRI; 6	NHA; 9	DAR; 4	RCH; 38	DOV; 23	MAR; 22	CLT; 29	TAL; 32	DAY; 10	PHO; 3	CAR; 9	ATL; 13				8th	3928	
1999	Richard Childress Racing	3	Chevy	DAY; 2	CAR; 41	LVS; 7	ATL; 40	DAR; 25	TEX; 8	BRI; 10	MAR; 19	TAL; 1*	CAL; 12	RCH; 8	CLT; 6	DOV; 11	MCH; 16	POC; 7	SON; 9	DAY; 2	NHA; 8	POC; 9	IND; 10	GLN; 20	MCH; 5	BRI; 1	DAR; 22	RCH; 6	NHA; 13	DOV; 8	MAR; 2	CLT; 12	TAL; 1	CAR; 40	PHO; 11	HOM; 8	ATL; 9			7th	4492	
2000	Richard Childress Racing	3	Chevy	DAY; 21	CAR; 2	LVS; 8	ATL; 1	DAR; 3	BRI; 39	TEX; 7	MAR; 9	TAL; 3	CAL; 17	RCH; 10	CLT; 3	DOV; 6	MCH; 2	POC; 4	SON; 6	DAY; 8	NHA; 6	POC; 25	IND; 8	GLN; 25	MCH; 6	BRI; 4	DAR; 3	RCH; 2	NHA; 12	DOV; 17	MAR; 2	CLT; 11	TAL; 1	CAR; 17	PHO; 9	HOM; 20	ATL; 2			2nd	4865	
2001	Richard Childress Racing	3	Chevy	DAY; 12	CAR	LVS	ATL	DAR	BRI	TEX	MAR	TAL	CAL	RCH	CLT	DOV	MCH	POC	SON	DAY	CHI	NHA	POC	IND	GLN	MCH	BRI	DAR	RCH	DOV	KAN	CLT	MAR	TAL	PHO	CAR	HOM	ATL	NHA	57th	132	

===== Daytona 500 =====
Year	Team	Manufacturer	Start	Finish
1979	Osterlund Racing	Buick	10	8
1980	Osterlund Racing	Oldsmobile	32	4
1981	Osterlund Racing	Pontiac	7	5
1982	Bud Moore Engineering	Ford	10	36
1983	Bud Moore Engineering	Ford	3	35
1984	Richard Childress Racing	Chevrolet	29	2
1985	Richard Childress Racing	Chevrolet	18	32
1986	Richard Childress Racing	Chevrolet	4	14
1987	Richard Childress Racing	Chevrolet	13	5
1988	Richard Childress Racing	Chevrolet	6	10
1989	Richard Childress Racing	Chevrolet	8	3
1990	Richard Childress Racing	Chevrolet	2	5
1991	Richard Childress Racing	Chevrolet	4	5
1992	Richard Childress Racing	Chevrolet	3	9
1993	Richard Childress Racing	Chevrolet	4	2
1994	Richard Childress Racing	Chevrolet	2	7
1995	Richard Childress Racing	Chevrolet	2	2
1996	Richard Childress Racing	Chevrolet	**1**	2
1997	Richard Childress Racing	Chevrolet	4	31
1998	Richard Childress Racing	Chevrolet	4	**1**
1999	Richard Childress Racing	Chevrolet	4	2
2000	Richard Childress Racing	Chevrolet	21	21
2001	Richard Childress Racing	Chevrolet	7	12

==== Busch Series ====
NASCAR Busch Series results
Year	Team	No.	Make	1	2	3	4	5	6	7	8	9	10	11	12	13	14	15	16	17	18	19	20	21	22	23	24	25	26	27	28	29	30	31	32	33	34	35	NBGNC	Pts	Ref
1982	Robert Gee	15	Pontiac	DAY; 1*	RCH			DAR; 21	HCY	SBO				DOV; 18	HCY	CLT; 2	ASH	HCY	SBO	CAR; 2	CRW	SBO	HCY	LGY	IRP			RCH; 23	MAR	CLT; DNQ	HCY	MAR							21st	1188	
1982	Robert Gee	45	Pontiac			BRI; 17	MAR																																21st	1188	
1982	Robert Gee	15	Olds								CRW; 1	RCH	LGY																										21st	1188	
1982	Whitaker Racing	15	Pontiac																							BRI; 30	HCY												21st	1188	
1983	Robert Gee	15	Pontiac	DAY; 21	RCH	**CAR**; 1*	HCY	MAR	NWS	SBO	GPS	LGY	DOV; 4	BRI	CLT; 1*	SBO	HCY	ROU	SBO	ROU	CRW	ROU	SBO	HCY	LGY	IRP	GPS	BRI	HCY	DAR	RCH	NWS	SBO	MAR	ROU	CLT; 2	HCY	MAR	31st	790	
1984	Whitaker Racing	7	Olds	DAY; 37	RCH; 3	CAR	HCY	MAR	DAR; 31	ROU	NSV	LGY	MLW	DOV																									39th	553	
1984	Dale Earnhardt, Inc.	8	Pontiac												CLT; 4	SBO	HCY	ROU	SBO	ROU	HCY	IRP	LGY	SBO	BRI	DAR; 19	RCH	NWS	CLT; 38	HCY	CAR	MAR							39th	553	
1985	Dale Earnhardt, Inc.	8	Pontiac	DAY; 35	CAR; 1*	HCY	BRI	MAR	**DAR**; 29	SBO	LGY	DOV	CLT	SBO	HCY	ROU	IRP	SBO	LGY	HCY	MLW	BRI	DAR; 22	RCH; 21	NWS	ROU	CLT; 4	HCY	CAR	MAR									47th	391	
1986	Dale Earnhardt, Inc.	8	Pontiac	DAY; 1	CAR; 1	HCY	MAR		DAR; 2*	SBO	LGY	JFC	DOV	CLT; 15	SBO	HCY	ROU										DAR; 1*					**CLT**; 1*	CAR	MAR					25th	1611	
1986	Dale Earnhardt, Inc.	8	Chevy					BRI; 2										IRP; 25	SBO	RAL; 3	OXF	SBO	HCY	LGY	ROU	BRI; 2		RCH; 1*	DOV	MAR	ROU								25th	1611	
1987	Dale Earnhardt, Inc.	8	Chevy	DAY; 27*	HCY	MAR	DAR; 1*	**BRI**; 4*	LGY	SBO	CLT; 5*	DOV	IRP; 31	ROU	JFC	OXF	SBO	HCY	RAL	LGY	ROU	BRI; 32	JFC	DAR; 35	RCH; 31	DOV	MAR	CLT; 21	CAR; 3*	MAR									33rd	1107	
1988	Dale Earnhardt, Inc.	8	Chevy	DAY; 37	HCY; 8	**CAR**; 27*	MAR	DAR; 4	BRI; 1	LNG	NZH; 6	SBO; 25	NSV	CLT; 5	DOV	ROU	LAN	LVL	MYB; 27	OXF	SBO	HCY	LNG	IRP; 29	ROU	BRI; 3	DAR; 32	RCH	DOV	MAR	CLT; 33	CAR; 2	MAR						25th	1633	
1989	Dale Earnhardt, Inc.	3	Pontiac	DAY; 4																																			25th	1637	
1989	Dale Earnhardt, Inc.	3	Chevy		CAR; 2	MAR	HCY; 10	DAR; 6	BRI; 27	NZH; 37	SBO	LAN	NSV	CLT; 20						SBO; 28	HCY	DUB	IRP; 5	ROU	BRI; 5	DAR; 4*	RCH; 5	DOV	MAR	CLT; 27	CAR	MAR							25th	1637	
1989	Baker-Schiff Racing	87	Pontiac												DOV; 3	ROU	LVL	VOL	MYB																				25th	1637	
1990	Dale Earnhardt, Inc.	3	Chevy	DAY; 1*	RCH; 2	CAR; 1	MAR	HCY; 20	DAR; 29	BRI; 5	LAN	SBO	NZH	HCY	CLT; 8	DOV	ROU	VOL	MYB	OXF	NHA; 7	SBO	DUB	IRP; 3	ROU	BRI; 24*	DAR; 38	RCH; 4	DOV	MAR	CLT; 4	NHA	CAR; 2	MAR					26th	1947	
1991	Dale Earnhardt, Inc.	3	Chevy	DAY; 1*	RCH; 2	**CAR**; 3	MAR	VOL	HCY	DAR; 3	BRI; 3	LAN	SBO	NZH	CLT; 1*	DOV	ROU	HCY	MYB	GLN	OXF	NHA; 35	SBO	DUB	IRP; 33	ROU	BRI; 11	DAR; 1*	RCH; 7*	DOV	CLT; 39	NHA	CAR; 6*	MAR					27th	1799	
1992	Dale Earnhardt, Inc.	3	Chevy	DAY; 1*	CAR; 4*	RCH	ATL; 31	MAR	DAR; 17	BRI					CLT; 28	DOV; 16	ROU	MYB	GLN	VOL	NHA	**TAL**; 4	IRP	ROU	MCH; 3	NHA; 2	BRI	DAR; 4	RCH	DOV	CLT; 41	MAR	CAR; 12	HCY					23rd	1665	
1992	Ken Schrader Racing	15	Chevy								HCY; 12	LAN	DUB	NZH																									23rd	1665	
1993	Dale Earnhardt, Inc.	3	Chevy	DAY; 1*	CAR; 3	RCH	DAR	BRI	HCY	ROU	MAR	NZH	CLT; 36	DOV; 13	MYB	GLN	MLW	TAL; 1*	IRP	MCH; 41	NHA; 42	BRI	DAR; 40	RCH	DOV	ROU	CLT; 3	MAR	CAR	HCY	ATL; QL^{†}								37th	989	
1994	Dale Earnhardt, Inc.	3	Chevy	DAY; 1	CAR; 38	RCH; DNQ	ATL; 10	MAR	DAR; 6	HCY	BRI	ROU	NHA; 31	NZH	CLT; 23	DOV; 39	MYB	GLN	MLW	SBO	TAL; 3	HCY	IRP	MCH; 32	BRI	DAR; 41	RCH; 3	DOV	CLT; 45	MAR	CAR								34th	1188	
^{†} - Qualified but replaced by Neil Bonnett

==== Winston West Series ====
NASCAR Winston West Series results
Year	Team/Owner	No.	Make	1	2	3	4	5	6	7	8	9	10	11	12	13	14	NWWC	Pts	Ref
1981	Osterlund Racing	72	Pontiac	RSD	S99	AAS	MMR	RSD	LAG	POR; 19	WSP	EVG	SHA	RSD	SON	RSD	PHO	43rd	35	
1985	Bill Schmitt	3	Chevy	SON	SHA	RSD	MMR	SIR; 1*	POR	STA	YAK	EVG	WSR	MMR	RSD			33rd	60	

==== Busch North Series ====
NASCAR Busch North Series results
Year	Team/Owner	No.	Make	1	2	3	4	5	6	7	8	9	10	11	12	13	14	15	16	17	18	19	20	21	22	23	24	25	NBNC	Pts	Ref
1988	Dale Shaw	68	Pontiac	DAY	CAR	DAR	NZH	MND	OXF	OXF	DOV	OXF	JEN; 20	CPA	EPP	TIO	OXF	JEN	TMP	IRP	OXF	RPS	DAR	RCH	DOV	OXF	OXF	EPP	56th	103	
1993	Dale Earnhardt, Inc.	8	Chevy	LEE	NHA	MND	NZH	HOL	GLN	JEN	STA	GLN	NHA; 31	WIS	NHA	NHA	RPS	TMP	WMM	LEE	EPP	LRP							70th	70	

=== International Race of Champions ===
(key) (Bold – Pole position. * – Most laps led.)

International Race of Champions results
Year	Make	Q1	Q2	Q3	1	2	3	4	Pos.	Pts	Ref
1979−80	Chevy	MCH; 7	MCH	RSD	RSD	ATL			NA	0	
1984	Chevy				MCH; 7	CLE; 10	TAL; 3	MCH; 11	9th	31	
1987	Chevy				DAY; 2	MOH; 11	MCH; 12	GLN; 9	10th	30	
1988	Chevy				DAY; 2	RSD; 12	MCH; 2	GLN; 7	5th	45	
1989	Chevy				DAY; 3*	NZH; 7	MCH; 2	GLN; 5	4th	57	
1990	Dodge				TAL; 1	CLE; 5	MCH; 1*		1st	60	
1991	Dodge				DAY; 12	**TAL**; 9	**MCH**; 9	GLN; 4	9th	27	
1992	Dodge				DAY; 1	TAL; 2	MCH; 5	MCH; 5	2nd	63	
1993	Dodge				DAY	DAR; 2	TAL; 3	MCH; 5*	NA	0	
1994	Dodge				**DAY**; 1	DAR; 4	TAL; 8	MCH; 4	4th	56	
1995	Dodge				DAY; 1	DAR; 8	TAL; 1*	MCH; 11	1st	61	
1996	Pontiac				DAY; 1	TAL; 9	CLT; 10	MCH	8th	39	
1997	Pontiac				DAY; 3	CLT; 8	CAL; 9	MCH; 7	7th	35	
1998	Pontiac				DAY; 4	CAL; 10	MCH; 4	IND; 8	7th	36	
1999	Pontiac				DAY; 1	TAL; 1	MCH; 1*	IND; 8	1st	75	
2000	Pontiac				**DAY**; 1*	TAL; 3	MCH; 3	IND; 2	1st	74	
2001	Pontiac				**DAY**; 7*	TAL	MCH	IND	NA	0	

=== ARCA Hooters SuperCar Series ===
(key) (Bold – Pole position awarded by qualifying time. Italics – Pole position earned by points standings or practice time. * – Most laps led.)

ARCA Hooters SuperCar Series results
Year	Team	No.	Make	1	2	3	4	5	6	7	8	9	10	11	12	13	14	15	16	17	18	19	20	AHSSC	Pts	Ref
1991	Dale Earnhardt, Inc.	3	Chevy	DAY	ATL	KIL	TAL	TOL	FRS	POC	MCH	KIL	FRS	DEL	POC	TAL	HPT; 30	MCH	ISF	TOL	DSF	TWS	ATL	113th	-	
1993	Dale Earnhardt, Inc.	3	Chevy	DAY	FIF	TWS; 5	TAL	KIL	CMS	FRS	TOL	POC	MCH	FRS	POC	KIL	ISF	DSF	TOL	SLM	WIN	ATL		109th	-	

=== 24 Hours of Daytona ===
(key)

24 Hours of Daytona results
Year	Class	No	Team	Car	Co-drivers	Laps	Position	Class Pos.
2001	GTS	3	(United States) Corvette Racing	Chevrolet Corvette	(United Kingdom) Andy Pilgrim (United States) Dale Earnhardt Jr. (United States) Kelly Collins	642	4	2

== See also ==
- Jeffrey Earnhardt, grandson
- Bobby Earnhardt, grandson
- List of Daytona 500 winners
- List of Daytona 500 pole position winners
- List of NASCAR Sprint Cup Series champions
- List of all-time NASCAR Cup Series winners
- List of members of the NASCAR Hall of Fame
- List of NASCAR fatalities

== Notes ==
Sporting positions
Preceded by Richard Petty; Darrell Waltrip; Rusty Wallace; Alan Kulwicki	NASCAR Cup Series Champion; 1980; 1986, 1987; 1990, 1991; 1993, 1994	Succeeded by Darrell Waltrip; Bill Elliott; Alan Kulwicki; Jeff Gordon
Preceded by Terry Labonte; Terry Labonte; Mark Martin	IROC Champion; IROC XIV (1990); IROC XIX (1995); IROC XXIII (1999) – IROC XXIV (2000)	Succeeded by Rusty Wallace; Mark Martin; Bobby Labonte
Achievements
Preceded by Jeff Gordon	Brickyard 400 winner 1995	Succeeded by Dale Jarrett
Preceded by Darrell Waltrip; Davey Allison	Coca-Cola 600 winner 1986; 1992, 1993	Succeeded by Kyle Petty; Jeff Gordon
Preceded by Jeff Gordon	Daytona 500 winner 1998	Succeeded by Jeff Gordon
Preceded by Tim Richmond; Bill Elliott	Southern 500 winner 1987; 1989, 1990	Succeeded by Bill Elliott; Harry Gant
Preceded by Buddy Baker; Terry Labonte; Bill Elliott; Ken Schrader; Geoff Bodine; Jeff Gordon	Busch Clash winner 1980; 1986; 1988; 1991; 1993; 1995	Succeeded by Darrell Waltrip; Bill Elliott; Ken Schrader; Geoff Bodine; Jeff Gordon; Dale Jarrett
Preceded by Bill Elliott; Rusty Wallace; Davey Allison	The Winston winner 1987; 1990; 1993	Succeeded by Terry Labonte; Davey Allison; Geoff Bodine
Awards
Preceded by Ronnie Thomas	NASCAR Winston Cup Series Rookie of the Year; 1979	Succeeded by Jody Ridley
Preceded by Jeff Gordon	NASCAR EA cover athlete 1999, 2000	Succeeded by Tony Stewart
Preceded by Bill Elliott	NASCAR Winston Cup Series Most Popular Driver; 2001	Succeeded by Bill Elliott
Preceded by Kenny Irwin Jr.	NASCAR Cup Series fatal accidents 2001	Succeeded by Last-ever NASCAR Cup Series fatality to date
