= 1990 The Winston =

Sixth iteration of the NASCAR All-Star Race

Race details
- Race 2 of 2 exhibition races in the 1990 NASCAR Winston Cup Series
- Date: May 20, 1990
- Location: Concord, North Carolina
- Course: Charlotte Motor Speedway
- Course length: 1.5 miles (2.4 km)
- Distance: 70 laps, 105 mi (168.981 km)
- Weather: Temperatures around 71.8 °F (22.1 °C), with winds gusting to 8.75 miles per hour (14.08 km/h)
- Average speed: 163.001 mph (262.325 km/h)

Pole position
Driver	Dale Earnhardt	Richard Childress Racing

Most laps led
Driver	Dale Earnhardt	Richard Childress Racing
- Laps: 70

Winner
No. 3	Dale Earnhardt	Richard Childress Racing

Television in the United States
- Network: ABC
- Announcers: Paul Page, Benny Parsons, and Bobby Unser

The 1990 edition of The Winston was a stock car racing competition that took place on May 20, 1990. Held at Charlotte Motor Speedway in Concord, North Carolina, the 70-lap race was an exhibition race in the 1990 NASCAR Winston Cup Series. Dale Earnhardt of Richard Childress Racing won the pole and led all 70 laps to win the race and collect a total purse of US$325,000. He also became the first two-time winner of The Winston.

Unlike the previous two events, which ran for 135 laps and three segments each, this race used a 70-lap, two-segment format.

== Background ==
Charlotte Motor Speedway, the track where the race was held.

The Winston was open to race winners from last season through the 1990 Winston 500 at Talladega Superspeedway. The winner of The Winston Open advanced to complete the starting grid. Because the field did not meet the minimum requirement of 19 cars, the remaining spots were awarded to the most recent winning drivers prior to the 1989 season. Neil Bonnett was eligible for this race, but had to bow out due to an injury he sustained at Darlington on April 1. As a result, his eligibility was given to Morgan Shepherd.

=== 1990 The Winston drivers and eligibility ===
==== Race winners in 1989 and 1990 ====
- 1-Terry Labonte (2 wins in 1989)
- 3-Dale Earnhardt (8 wins from 1989 and 1990)
- 5-Ricky Rudd (1 win in 1989)
- 6-Mark Martin (2 wins from 1989 and 1990)
- 9-Bill Elliott (3 wins in 1989)
- 10-Derrike Cope (2 wins in 1990, including the 1990 Daytona 500)
- 11-Geoff Bodine (2 wins from 1989 and 1990)
- 17-Darrell Waltrip (6 wins in 1989, including the 1989 Daytona 500)
- 25-Ken Schrader (1 win in 1989)
- 26-Brett Bodine (1 win in 1990)
- 27-Rusty Wallace (6 wins in 1989)
- 28-Davey Allison (3 wins from 1989 and 1990)
- 33-Harry Gant (1 win in 1989)
- 42-Kyle Petty (1 win in 1990)

==== Race winners from previous years, not eligible by the above criteria ====
- 7-Alan Kulwicki (1 win in 1988)
- 8-Bobby Hillin Jr. (1 win in 1986)
- 15-Morgan Shepherd (1 win in 1986)
- 73-Phil Parsons (1 win in 1988)
- 83-Lake Speed (1 win in 1988)

==== Winner of The Winston Open ====
- 66-Dick Trickle

== Race summary ==
=== Segment 1 (50 laps) ===
Dale Earnhardt won the pole while Davey Allison took the outside pole. Dick Trickle made the starting grid by winning the Winston Open after beating Rob Moroso by a margin of only eight inches. Allison and Bill Elliott served as the onboard camera cars throughout the race. As the green flag dropped, Earnhardt charged forward while Darrell Waltrip overtook Allison for second place. By the fifth lap, Mark Martin took second place from Waltrip and set his sights on Earnhardt. On lap 8, defending champion Rusty Wallace retired from the race after his engine expired. Segment 1 ended with Earnhardt taking the checkered flag while leading all 50 laps.

Race 1 results

1. 3-Dale Earnhardt (US$50,000)
2. 9-Bill Elliott
3. 6-Mark Martin
4. 25-Ken Schrader
5. 7-Alan Kulwicki

=== Segment 2 (20 laps) ===
Earnhardt led the field on the second segment. Elliott suddenly lost momentum as Martin, Alan Kulwicki, and Ken Schrader passed him. The caution flag waved on lap 54 after NASCAR officials spotted oil on turns one and two. On the restart, Schrader challenged Martin for second place with Elliott close behind them while Trickle and Allison fought Kulwicki for fifth place. In the end, Earnhardt held off Schrader to win the race and US$200,000, becoming the first two-time winner and the first flag-to-flag winner of The Winston.

Race results
Pos	Grid	Car	Driver	Owner	Manufacturer	Laps run	Laps led
1	1	3	Dale Earnhardt	Richard Childress Racing	Chevrolet	70	70
2	9	25	Ken Schrader	Hendrick Motorsports	Chevrolet	70	0
3	4	6	Mark Martin	Roush Racing	Ford	70	0
4	6	9	Bill Elliott	Melling Racing	Ford	70	0
5	2	28	Davey Allison	Robert Yates Racing	Ford	70	0
6	20	66	Dick Trickle	Cale Yarborough Motorsports	Pontiac	70	0
7	11	33	Harry Gant	Jackson Motorsports	Chevrolet	70	0
8	8	7	Alan Kulwicki	AK Racing	Ford	70	0
9	5	15	Morgan Shepherd	Bud Moore Engineering	Ford	70	0
10	15	8	Bobby Hillin Jr.	Stavola Brothers Racing	Buick	70	0
11	10	83	Lake Speed	Speed Racing	Oldsmobile	70	0
12	13	5	Ricky Rudd	Hendrick Motorsports	Chevrolet	70	0
13	3	17	Darrell Waltrip	Hendrick Motorsports	Chevrolet	70	0
14	17	1	Terry Labonte	Precision Products Racing	Oldsmobile	70	0
15	12	42	Kyle Petty	SABCO Racing	Pontiac	69	0
16	19	11	Geoff Bodine	Junior Johnson & Associates	Ford	69	0
17	18	73	Phil Parsons	Barkdoll Motorsports	Oldsmobile	69	0
18	7	10	Derrike Cope	Whitcomb Racing	Chevrolet	68	0
19	16	26	Brett Bodine	King Racing	Buick	55	0
20	14	27	Rusty Wallace	Blue Max Racing	Pontiac	8	0
