= 1996 TranSouth Financial 400 =

Fifth race of the 1996 NASCAR Winston Cup Series

Race details
- Race 5 of 31 in the 1996 NASCAR Winston Cup Series
- The 1996 TranSouth Financial 400 program cover, featuring Dale Earnhardt and Sterling Marlin.
- Date: March 24, 1996
- Official name: 40th Annual TranSouth Financial 400
- Location: Darlington, South Carolina, Darlington Raceway
- Course: Permanent racing facility
- Course length: 1.366 miles (2.198 km)
- Distance: 293 laps, 400.238 mi (644.12 km)
- Average speed: 124.792 miles per hour (200.833 km/h)

Pole position
Driver	Ward Burton	Bill Davis Racing
- Time: 28.295

Most laps led
Driver	Jeff Gordon	Hendrick Motorsports
- Laps: 189

Winner
No. 24	Jeff Gordon	Hendrick Motorsports

Television in the United States
- Network: ESPN
- Announcers: Bob Jenkins, Ned Jarrett, Benny Parsons

Radio in the United States
- Radio: MRN

The 1996 TranSouth Financial 400 was the fifth stock car race of the 1996 NASCAR Winston Cup Series and the 40th iteration of the event. The race was held on Sunday, March 24, 1996, in Darlington, South Carolina, at Darlington Raceway, a 1.366 miles (2.198 km) permanent egg-shaped oval racetrack. The race took the scheduled 293 laps to complete. With seven laps to go, Hendrick Motorsports driver Jeff Gordon would manage to take advantage of a disaster-stricken Dale Jarrett and pull away to take his 11th career NASCAR Winston Cup Series victory and his second victory of the season. To fill out the top three, Joe Gibbs Racing driver Bobby Labonte and Larry Hedrick Motorsports driver Ricky Craven would finish second and third, respectively.

== Background ==
The layout of Darlington Raceway, the venue where the race was held.

Darlington Raceway is a race track built for NASCAR racing located near Darlington, South Carolina. It is nicknamed "The Lady in Black" and "The Track Too Tough to Tame" by many NASCAR fans and drivers and advertised as "A NASCAR Tradition." It is of a unique, somewhat egg-shaped design, an oval with the ends of very different configurations, a condition which supposedly arose from the proximity of one end of the track to a minnow pond the owner refused to relocate. This situation makes it very challenging for the crews to set up their cars' handling in a way that is effective at both ends.

=== Entry list ===
- (R) denotes rookie driver.

#	Driver	Team	Make
1	Rick Mast	Precision Products Racing	Pontiac
2	Rusty Wallace	Penske Racing South	Ford
02	Robbie Faggart	Miles Motorsports	Chevrolet
3	Dale Earnhardt	Richard Childress Racing	Chevrolet
4	Sterling Marlin	Morgan–McClure Motorsports	Chevrolet
5	Terry Labonte	Hendrick Motorsports	Chevrolet
6	Mark Martin	Roush Racing	Ford
7	Geoff Bodine	Geoff Bodine Racing	Ford
8	Hut Stricklin	Stavola Brothers Racing	Ford
9	Lake Speed	Melling Racing	Ford
10	Ricky Rudd	Rudd Performance Motorsports	Ford
11	Brett Bodine	Brett Bodine Racing	Ford
12	Derrike Cope	Bobby Allison Motorsports	Ford
15	Wally Dallenbach Jr.	Bud Moore Engineering	Ford
16	Ted Musgrave	Roush Racing	Ford
17	Darrell Waltrip	Darrell Waltrip Motorsports	Chevrolet
18	Bobby Labonte	Joe Gibbs Racing	Chevrolet
19	Dick Trickle	TriStar Motorsports	Ford
21	Michael Waltrip	Wood Brothers Racing	Ford
22	Ward Burton	Bill Davis Racing	Pontiac
23	Jimmy Spencer	Haas-Carter Motorsports	Ford
24	Jeff Gordon	Hendrick Motorsports	Chevrolet
25	Ken Schrader	Hendrick Motorsports	Chevrolet
27	Elton Sawyer	David Blair Motorsports	Ford
28	Ernie Irvan	Robert Yates Racing	Ford
29	Steve Grissom	Diamond Ridge Motorsports	Chevrolet
30	Johnny Benson Jr. (R)	Bahari Racing	Pontiac
33	Robert Pressley	Leo Jackson Motorsports	Chevrolet
37	Jeremy Mayfield	Kranefuss-Haas Racing	Ford
41	Ricky Craven	Larry Hedrick Motorsports	Chevrolet
42	Kyle Petty	Team SABCO	Pontiac
43	Bobby Hamilton	Petty Enterprises	Pontiac
71	Dave Marcis	Marcis Auto Racing	Chevrolet
75	Morgan Shepherd	Butch Mock Motorsports	Ford
77	Bobby Hillin Jr.	Jasper Motorsports	Ford
78	Randy MacDonald	Triad Motorsports	Ford
81	Kenny Wallace	FILMAR Racing	Ford
87	Joe Nemechek	NEMCO Motorsports	Chevrolet
88	Dale Jarrett	Robert Yates Racing	Ford
90	Mike Wallace	Donlavey Racing	Ford
94	Bill Elliott	Bill Elliott Racing	Ford
95	Chuck Bown	Sadler Brothers Racing	Ford
98	Jeremy Mayfield	Cale Yarborough Motorsports	Ford
99	Jeff Burton	Roush Racing	Ford

== Qualifying ==
Qualifying was split into two rounds. The first round was held on Friday, March 22, at 3:00 PM EST. Each driver would have one lap to set a time. During the first round, the top 25 drivers in the round would be guaranteed a starting spot in the race. If a driver was not able to guarantee a spot in the first round, they had the option to scrub their time from the first round and try and run a faster lap time in a second round qualifying run, held on Saturday, March 23, at 11:30 AM EST. As with the first round, each driver would have one lap to set a time. For this specific race, positions 26-38 would be decided on time, and depending on who needed it, a select amount of positions were given to cars who had not otherwise qualified but were high enough in owner's points.

Ward Burton, driving for Bill Davis Racing, would win the pole, setting a time of 28.295 and an average speed of 173.797 miles per hour (279.699 km/h).

Three drivers would fail to qualify: Chuck Bown, Randy MacDonald, and Robbie Faggart.

=== Full qualifying results ===
Pos.	#	Driver	Team	Make	Time	Speed
1	22	Ward Burton	Bill Davis Racing	Pontiac	28.295	173.797
2	24	Jeff Gordon	Hendrick Motorsports	Chevrolet	28.325	173.613
3	88	Dale Jarrett	Robert Yates Racing	Ford	28.527	172.384
4	75	Morgan Shepherd	Butch Mock Motorsports	Ford	28.640	171.704
5	94	Bill Elliott	Bill Elliott Racing	Ford	28.652	171.632
6	25	Ken Schrader	Hendrick Motorsports	Chevrolet	28.657	171.602
7	81	Kenny Wallace	FILMAR Racing	Ford	28.686	171.429
8	2	Rusty Wallace	Penske Racing South	Ford	28.687	171.423
9	98	Jeremy Mayfield	Cale Yarborough Motorsports	Ford	28.704	171.321
10	27	Elton Sawyer	David Blair Motorsports	Ford	28.705	171.315
11	1	Rick Mast	Precision Products Racing	Pontiac	28.708	171.297
12	23	Jimmy Spencer	Travis Carter Enterprises	Ford	28.731	171.160
13	18	Bobby Labonte	Joe Gibbs Racing	Chevrolet	28.732	171.154
14	41	Ricky Craven	Larry Hedrick Motorsports	Chevrolet	28.746	171.071
15	11	Brett Bodine	Brett Bodine Racing	Ford	28.746	171.071
16	6	Mark Martin	Roush Racing	Ford	28.747	171.065
17	5	Terry Labonte	Hendrick Motorsports	Chevrolet	28.749	171.053
18	16	Ted Musgrave	Roush Racing	Ford	28.758	170.999
19	7	Geoff Bodine	Geoff Bodine Racing	Ford	28.779	170.875
20	12	Derrike Cope	Bobby Allison Motorsports	Ford	28.782	170.857
21	99	Jeff Burton	Roush Racing	Ford	28.804	170.726
22	19	Dick Trickle	TriStar Motorsports	Ford	28.805	170.720
23	43	Bobby Hamilton	Petty Enterprises	Pontiac	28.809	170.697
24	10	Ricky Rudd	Rudd Performance Motorsports	Ford	28.826	170.596
25	9	Lake Speed	Melling Racing	Ford	28.828	170.584
Failed to lock in Round 1
26	77	Bobby Hillin Jr.	Jasper Motorsports	Ford	28.842	170.502
27	3	Dale Earnhardt	Richard Childress Racing	Chevrolet	28.891	170.212
28	29	Steve Grissom	Diamond Ridge Motorsports	Chevrolet	28.963	169.789
29	21	Michael Waltrip	Wood Brothers Racing	Ford	28.972	169.736
30	17	Darrell Waltrip	Darrell Waltrip Motorsports	Chevrolet	28.972	169.736
31	33	Robert Pressley	Leo Jackson Motorsports	Chevrolet	28.985	169.660
32	28	Ernie Irvan	Robert Yates Racing	Ford	28.987	169.648
33	4	Sterling Marlin	Morgan–McClure Motorsports	Chevrolet	29.000	169.572
34	8	Hut Stricklin	Stavola Brothers Racing	Ford	29.016	169.479
35	37	John Andretti	Kranefuss-Haas Racing	Ford	29.034	169.374
36	15	Wally Dallenbach Jr.	Bud Moore Engineering	Ford	29.053	169.263
37	71	Dave Marcis	Marcis Auto Racing	Chevrolet	29.059	169.228
38	30	Johnny Benson Jr. (R)	Bahari Racing	Pontiac	29.079	169.112
Provisionals
39	42	Kyle Petty	Team SABCO	Pontiac	-*	-*
40	87	Joe Nemechek	NEMCO Motorsports	Chevrolet	-*	-*
41	90	Mike Wallace	Donlavey Racing	Ford	-*	-*
Failed to qualify
42	95	Chuck Bown	Sadler Brothers Racing	Ford	-*	-*
43	78	Randy MacDonald	Triad Motorsports	Ford	-*	-*
44	02	Robbie Faggart	Miles Motorsports	Chevrolet	-*	-*
Official first round qualifying results
Official starting lineup

== Race results ==
Fin	St	#	Driver	Team	Make	Laps	Led	Status	Pts	Winnings
1	2	24	Jeff Gordon	Hendrick Motorsports	Chevrolet	293	189	running	185	$97,310
2	13	18	Bobby Labonte	Joe Gibbs Racing	Chevrolet	293	38	running	175	$57,550
3	14	41	Ricky Craven	Larry Hedrick Motorsports	Chevrolet	293	0	running	165	$46,690
4	8	2	Rusty Wallace	Penske Racing South	Ford	293	0	running	160	$29,480
5	17	5	Terry Labonte	Hendrick Motorsports	Chevrolet	293	0	running	155	$34,325
6	16	6	Mark Martin	Roush Racing	Ford	293	0	running	150	$31,275
7	18	16	Ted Musgrave	Roush Racing	Ford	293	0	running	146	$25,695
8	4	75	Morgan Shepherd	Butch Mock Motorsports	Ford	292	0	running	142	$17,565
9	24	10	Ricky Rudd	Rudd Performance Motorsports	Ford	292	0	running	138	$27,560
10	21	99	Jeff Burton	Roush Racing	Ford	292	15	running	139	$15,055
11	33	4	Sterling Marlin	Morgan–McClure Motorsports	Chevrolet	292	20	running	135	$30,800
12	39	42	Kyle Petty	Team SABCO	Pontiac	292	0	running	127	$22,870
13	5	94	Bill Elliott	Bill Elliott Racing	Ford	292	0	running	124	$22,585
14	27	3	Dale Earnhardt	Richard Childress Racing	Chevrolet	292	1	running	126	$28,080
15	3	88	Dale Jarrett	Robert Yates Racing	Ford	291	10	out of gas	123	$22,950
16	23	43	Bobby Hamilton	Petty Enterprises	Pontiac	291	0	out of gas	115	$21,905
17	7	81	Kenny Wallace	FILMAR Racing	Ford	291	0	running	112	$10,550
18	9	98	Jeremy Mayfield	Cale Yarborough Motorsports	Ford	291	0	running	109	$14,515
19	11	1	Rick Mast	Precision Products Racing	Pontiac	290	0	running	106	$21,270
20	34	8	Hut Stricklin	Stavola Brothers Racing	Ford	290	0	running	103	$15,690
21	41	90	Mike Wallace	Donlavey Racing	Ford	289	0	running	100	$13,670
22	19	7	Geoff Bodine	Geoff Bodine Racing	Ford	289	0	running	97	$20,450
23	37	71	Dave Marcis	Marcis Auto Racing	Chevrolet	289	1	running	99	$13,205
24	38	30	Johnny Benson Jr. (R)	Bahari Racing	Pontiac	288	0	handling	91	$21,485
25	25	9	Lake Speed	Melling Racing	Ford	283	0	out of gas	88	$19,965
26	28	29	Steve Grissom	Diamond Ridge Motorsports	Chevrolet	282	0	running	85	$19,550
27	15	11	Brett Bodine	Brett Bodine Racing	Ford	281	0	engine	82	$19,385
28	6	25	Ken Schrader	Hendrick Motorsports	Chevrolet	281	0	running	79	$19,225
29	29	21	Michael Waltrip	Wood Brothers Racing	Ford	277	0	running	76	$19,115
30	10	27	Elton Sawyer	David Blair Motorsports	Ford	268	0	out of gas	73	$9,080
31	40	87	Joe Nemechek	NEMCO Motorsports	Chevrolet	242	0	handling	70	$16,020
32	12	23	Jimmy Spencer	Travis Carter Enterprises	Ford	233	0	running	67	$15,985
33	32	28	Ernie Irvan	Robert Yates Racing	Ford	230	0	running	64	$23,895
34	30	17	Darrell Waltrip	Darrell Waltrip Motorsports	Chevrolet	203	0	handling	61	$15,860
35	22	19	Dick Trickle	TriStar Motorsports	Ford	165	0	handling	58	$8,825
36	31	33	Robert Pressley	Leo Jackson Motorsports	Chevrolet	161	12	crash	60	15,790
37	36	15	Wally Dallenbach Jr.	Bud Moore Engineering	Ford	152	0	crash	52	$15,776
38	1	22	Ward Burton	Bill Davis Racing	Pontiac	137	7	crash	54	$29,029
39	20	12	Derrike Cope	Bobby Allison Motorsports	Ford	130	0	engine	46	$15,654
40	35	37	John Andretti	Kranefuss-Haas Racing	Ford	87	0	crash	43	$15,654
41	26	77	Bobby Hillin Jr.	Jasper Motorsports	Ford	29	0	crash	40	$9,279
Official race results

Previous race: 1996 Purolator 500	NASCAR Winston Cup Series; 1996 season	Next race: 1996 Food City 500
