= 1996 Winston Select 500 =

Ninth race of the 1996 NASCAR Winston Cup Series

Race details
- Race 9 of 31 in the 1996 NASCAR Winston Cup Series
- The 1996 Winston Select 500 program cover, featuring Mark Martin.
- Date: April 28, 1996
- Official name: 27th Annual DieHard 500
- Location: Lincoln, Alabama, Talladega Superspeedway
- Course: Permanent racing facility
- Course length: 2.66 miles (4.28 km)
- Distance: 188 laps, 500.08 mi (804.8 km)
- Average speed: 149.999 miles per hour (241.400 km/h)

Pole position
Driver	Ernie Irvan	Robert Yates Racing
- Time: 49.654

Most laps led
Driver	Sterling Marlin	Morgan–McClure Motorsports
- Laps: 48

Winner
No. 4	Sterling Marlin	Morgan–McClure Motorsports

Television in the United States
- Network: ESPN
- Announcers: Bob Jenkins, Ned Jarrett

Radio in the United States
- Radio: MRN

The 1996 Winston Select 500 was the ninth stock car race of the 1996 NASCAR Winston Cup Series and the 27th iteration of the event. The race was held on Sunday, April 28, 1996, in Lincoln, Alabama at Talladega Superspeedway, a 2.66 miles (4.28 km) permanent triangle-shaped superspeedway. At the end of the 188-lap race, Morgan–McClure Motorsports driver Sterling Marlin held off the field in the final 20 laps to take his fifth career NASCAR Winston Cup Series victory and his first victory of the season. To fill out the top three, Robert Yates Racing driver Dale Jarrett and Richard Childress Racing driver Dale Earnhardt finished second and third, respectively.

The race saw a series of crashes. The first major crash included Bill Elliott on lap 79, when Elliott's car spun into the backstretch grass area and blew over into the air. The car landed hard, with Elliott suffering a broken left femur, causing him to miss the next eight weeks of racing. Later into the race on lap 130, a crash involving 14 cars sent Ricky Craven flipping wildly into the air and into the protective catch-fence in turn 1. Craven was knocked unconscious during the crash, and suffered a broken back. This led to a nearly one-hour race stoppage for clean-up and catch fence repair.

== Entry list ==
- (R) denotes rookie driver.

#	Driver	Team	Make
0	Delma Cowart	H. L. Waters Racing	Ford
1	Rick Mast	Precision Products Racing	Pontiac
2	Rusty Wallace	Penske Racing South	Ford
3	Dale Earnhardt	Richard Childress Racing	Chevrolet
4	Sterling Marlin	Morgan–McClure Motorsports	Chevrolet
5	Terry Labonte	Hendrick Motorsports	Chevrolet
6	Mark Martin	Roush Racing	Ford
7	Geoff Bodine	Geoff Bodine Racing	Ford
8	Hut Stricklin	Stavola Brothers Racing	Ford
9	Lake Speed	Melling Racing	Ford
10	Ricky Rudd	Rudd Performance Motorsports	Ford
11	Brett Bodine	Brett Bodine Racing	Ford
12	Derrike Cope	Bobby Allison Motorsports	Ford
15	Wally Dallenbach Jr.	Bud Moore Engineering	Ford
16	Ted Musgrave	Roush Racing	Ford
17	Darrell Waltrip	Darrell Waltrip Motorsports	Chevrolet
18	Bobby Labonte	Joe Gibbs Racing	Chevrolet
19	Dick Trickle	TriStar Motorsports	Ford
21	Michael Waltrip	Wood Brothers Racing	Ford
22	Ward Burton	Bill Davis Racing	Pontiac
23	Jimmy Spencer	Haas-Carter Motorsports	Ford
24	Jeff Gordon	Hendrick Motorsports	Chevrolet
25	Ken Schrader	Hendrick Motorsports	Chevrolet
27	Elton Sawyer	David Blair Motorsports	Ford
28	Ernie Irvan	Robert Yates Racing	Ford
29	Steve Grissom	Diamond Ridge Motorsports	Chevrolet
30	Johnny Benson Jr. (R)	Bahari Racing	Pontiac
31	Mike Skinner	Richard Childress Racing	Chevrolet
33	Robert Pressley	Leo Jackson Motorsports	Chevrolet
37	Jeremy Mayfield	Kranefuss-Haas Racing	Ford
41	Ricky Craven	Larry Hedrick Motorsports	Chevrolet
42	Kyle Petty	Team SABCO	Pontiac
43	Bobby Hamilton	Petty Enterprises	Pontiac
44	Jeff Purvis	Phoenix Racing	Chevrolet
57	Steve Seligman	O'Neil Racing	Ford
71	Dave Marcis	Marcis Auto Racing	Chevrolet
73	Phil Barkdoll	Barkdoll Racing	Chevrolet
75	Morgan Shepherd	Butch Mock Motorsports	Ford
77	Bobby Hillin Jr.	Jasper Motorsports	Ford
81	Kenny Wallace	FILMAR Racing	Ford
87	Joe Nemechek	NEMCO Motorsports	Chevrolet
88	Dale Jarrett	Robert Yates Racing	Ford
90	Mike Wallace	Donlavey Racing	Ford
94	Bill Elliott	Bill Elliott Racing	Ford
95	Chuck Bown	Sadler Brothers Racing	Ford
97	Chad Little	Mark Rypien Motorsports	Pontiac
98	Jeremy Mayfield	Cale Yarborough Motorsports	Ford
99	Jeff Burton	Roush Racing	Ford

== Qualifying ==
Qualifying was split into two rounds. The first round was held on Friday, April 26, at 4:00 PM EST. Each driver had one lap to set a time. After the first round, the top 25 drivers were guaranteed a starting spot in the race. Drivers outside the top 25 had the option to scrub their time from the first round and try and run a faster lap time in a second round qualifying run, held on Saturday, April 27, at 12:00 PM EST. As with the first round, each driver would have one lap to set a time. For this specific race, positions 26-32 were decided on time, and depending on who needed it, a select amount of positions were given to cars who had not otherwise qualified but were high enough in owner's points.

Ernie Irvan, driving for Robert Yates Racing, won the pole, setting a time of 49.654 and an average speed of 192.855 miles per hour (310.370 km/h).

Five drivers failed to qualify: Phil Barkdoll, Steve Seligman, Bobby Hillin Jr., Delma Cowart, and Chad Little.

=== Full qualifying results ===
Pos.	#	Driver	Team	Make	Time	Speed
1	28	Ernie Irvan	Robert Yates Racing	Ford	49.654	192.855
2	88	Dale Jarrett	Robert Yates Racing	Ford	49.730	192.560
3	98	Jeremy Mayfield	Cale Yarborough Motorsports	Ford	49.911	191.862
4	4	Sterling Marlin	Morgan–McClure Motorsports	Chevrolet	49.973	191.623
5	16	Ted Musgrave	Roush Racing	Ford	50.088	191.184
6	31	Mike Skinner	Richard Childress Racing	Chevrolet	50.092	191.168
7	44	Jeff Purvis	Phoenix Racing	Chevrolet	50.110	191.100
8	33	Robert Pressley	Leo Jackson Motorsports	Chevrolet	50.116	191.077
9	99	Jeff Burton	Roush Racing	Ford	50.125	191.042
10	30	Johnny Benson Jr. (R)	Bahari Racing	Pontiac	50.151	190.943
11	24	Jeff Gordon	Hendrick Motorsports	Chevrolet	50.160	190.909
12	12	Derrike Cope	Bobby Allison Motorsports	Ford	50.180	190.833
13	5	Terry Labonte	Hendrick Motorsports	Chevrolet	50.201	190.753
14	18	Bobby Labonte	Joe Gibbs Racing	Chevrolet	50.209	190.723
15	2	Rusty Wallace	Penske Racing South	Ford	50.217	190.692
16	3	Dale Earnhardt	Richard Childress Racing	Chevrolet	50.287	190.427
17	25	Ken Schrader	Hendrick Motorsports	Chevrolet	50.290	190.416
18	10	Ricky Rudd	Rudd Performance Motorsports	Ford	50.405	189.981
19	22	Ward Burton	Bill Davis Racing	Pontiac	50.414	189.947
20	94	Bill Elliott	Bill Elliott Racing	Ford	50.426	189.902
21	71	Dave Marcis	Marcis Auto Racing	Chevrolet	50.440	189.849
22	41	Ricky Craven	Larry Hedrick Motorsports	Chevrolet	50.483	189.688
23	29	Steve Grissom	Diamond Ridge Motorsports	Chevrolet	50.507	189.597
24	1	Rick Mast	Precision Products Racing	Pontiac	50.513	189.575
25	75	Morgan Shepherd	Butch Mock Motorsports	Ford	50.530	189.511
Failed to lock in Round 1
26	87	Joe Nemechek	NEMCO Motorsports	Chevrolet	50.171	190.867
27	9	Lake Speed	Melling Racing	Ford	50.329	190.268
28	95	Chuck Bown	Sadler Brothers Racing	Ford	50.350	190.189
29	7	Geoff Bodine	Geoff Bodine Racing	Ford	50.430	189.887
30	81	Kenny Wallace	FILMAR Racing	Ford	50.535	189.492
31	21	Michael Waltrip	Wood Brothers Racing	Ford	50.542	189.466
32	19	Dick Trickle	TriStar Motorsports	Ford	50.553	189.425
33	27	Elton Sawyer	David Blair Motorsports	Ford	50.553	189.425
34	37	John Andretti	Kranefuss-Haas Racing	Ford	50.655	189.044
35	15	Wally Dallenbach Jr.	Bud Moore Engineering	Ford	50.696	188.891
36	8	Hut Stricklin	Stavola Brothers Racing	Ford	50.699	188.879
37	6	Mark Martin	Roush Racing	Ford	50.706	188.853
38	23	Jimmy Spencer	Travis Carter Enterprises	Ford	50.772	188.608
Provisionals
39	43	Bobby Hamilton	Petty Enterprises	Pontiac	-*	-*
40	42	Kyle Petty	Team SABCO	Pontiac	-*	-*
41	11	Brett Bodine	Brett Bodine Racing	Ford	-*	-*
42	90	Mike Wallace	Donlavey Racing	Ford	-*	-*
Champion's Provisional
43	17	Darrell Waltrip	Darrell Waltrip Motorsports	Chevrolet	-*	-*
Failed to qualify
44	73	Phil Barkdoll	Barkdoll Racing	Chevrolet	-*	-*
45	57	Steve Seligman	O'Neil Racing	Ford	-*	-*
46	77	Bobby Hillin Jr.	Jasper Motorsports	Ford	-*	-*
47	0	Delma Cowart	H. L. Waters Racing	Ford	-*	-*
48	97	Chad Little	Mark Rypien Motorsports	Pontiac	-*	-*
Official first round qualifying results
Official starting lineup

== Race results ==
Fin	St	#	Driver	Team	Make	Laps	Led	Status	Pts	Winnings
1	4	4	Sterling Marlin	Morgan–McClure Motorsports	Chevrolet	188	48	running	185	$109,845
2	2	88	Dale Jarrett	Robert Yates Racing	Ford	188	20	running	175	$64,145
3	16	3	Dale Earnhardt	Richard Childress Racing	Chevrolet	188	26	running	170	$64,620
4	13	5	Terry Labonte	Hendrick Motorsports	Chevrolet	188	20	running	165	$60,570
5	31	21	Michael Waltrip	Wood Brothers Racing	Ford	188	8	running	160	$44,490
6	23	29	Steve Grissom	Diamond Ridge Motorsports	Chevrolet	188	12	running	155	$35,480
7	8	33	Robert Pressley	Leo Jackson Motorsports	Chevrolet	188	0	running	146	$35,975
8	5	16	Ted Musgrave	Roush Racing	Ford	188	0	running	142	$32,000
9	34	37	John Andretti	Kranefuss-Haas Racing	Ford	188	0	running	138	$30,525
10	10	30	Johnny Benson Jr. (R)	Bahari Racing	Pontiac	188	0	running	134	$34,525
11	39	43	Bobby Hamilton	Petty Enterprises	Pontiac	188	1	running	135	$30,345
12	35	15	Wally Dallenbach Jr.	Bud Moore Engineering	Ford	188	0	running	127	$27,265
13	26	87	Joe Nemechek	NEMCO Motorsports	Chevrolet	188	0	running	124	$21,135
14	30	81	Kenny Wallace	FILMAR Racing	Ford	188	6	running	126	$15,455
15	24	1	Rick Mast	Precision Products Racing	Pontiac	188	0	running	118	$26,825
16	9	99	Jeff Burton	Roush Racing	Ford	188	0	running	115	$14,785
17	6	31	Mike Skinner	Richard Childress Racing	Chevrolet	187	0	running	112	$14,070
18	40	42	Kyle Petty	Team SABCO	Pontiac	187	0	running	109	$24,430
19	32	19	Dick Trickle	TriStar Motorsports	Ford	187	0	running	106	$13,640
20	17	25	Ken Schrader	Hendrick Motorsports	Chevrolet	187	0	running	103	$25,730
21	43	17	Darrell Waltrip	Darrell Waltrip Motorsports	Chevrolet	187	0	running	100	$23,510
22	36	8	Hut Stricklin	Stavola Brothers Racing	Ford	186	0	running	97	$16,290
23	41	11	Brett Bodine	Brett Bodine Racing	Ford	186	0	running	94	$23,080
24	14	18	Bobby Labonte	Joe Gibbs Racing	Chevrolet	185	0	running	91	$28,775
25	28	95	Chuck Bown	Sadler Brothers Racing	Ford	185	0	running	88	$12,870
26	29	7	Geoff Bodine	Geoff Bodine Racing	Ford	181	0	handling	85	$22,690
27	19	22	Ward Burton	Bill Davis Racing	Pontiac	178	1	running	87	$31,535
28	18	10	Ricky Rudd	Rudd Performance Motorsports	Ford	175	0	running	79	$27,480
29	12	12	Derrike Cope	Bobby Allison Motorsports	Ford	168	0	running	76	$22,425
30	15	2	Rusty Wallace	Penske Racing South	Ford	159	16	handling	78	$27,370
31	1	28	Ernie Irvan	Robert Yates Racing	Ford	158	4	running	75	$32,155
32	3	98	Jeremy Mayfield	Cale Yarborough Motorsports	Ford	157	0	running	67	$15,410
33	11	24	Jeff Gordon	Hendrick Motorsports	Chevrolet	141	18	crash	69	$34,325
34	37	6	Mark Martin	Roush Racing	Ford	129	4	crash	66	$28,895
35	7	44	Jeff Purvis	Phoenix Racing	Chevrolet	129	0	crash	58	$12,065
36	22	41	Ricky Craven	Larry Hedrick Motorsports	Chevrolet	129	0	crash	55	$22,535
37	33	27	Elton Sawyer	David Blair Motorsports	Ford	129	0	crash	52	$11,971
38	42	90	Mike Wallace	Donlavey Racing	Ford	128	0	crash	49	$11,835
39	21	71	Dave Marcis	Marcis Auto Racing	Chevrolet	112	4	crash	51	$11,835
40	38	23	Jimmy Spencer	Travis Carter Enterprises	Ford	80	0	crash	43	$18,835
41	20	94	Bill Elliott	Bill Elliott Racing	Ford	77	0	crash	40	$18,835
42	27	9	Lake Speed	Melling Racing	Ford	60	0	crash	37	$18,835
43	25	75	Morgan Shepherd	Butch Mock Motorsports	Ford	20	0	crash	34	$11,835
Official race results

Previous race: 1996 Goody's Headache Powder 500 (Martinsville)	NASCAR Winston Cup Series; 1996 season	Next race: 1996 Save Mart Supermarkets 300
