= 1996 Purolator 500 =

Fourth race of the 1996 NASCAR Winston Cup Series

Race details
- Race 4 of 31 in the 1996 NASCAR Winston Cup Series
- The 1996 Primestar 500 program cover, featuring Jeff Gordon and David Pearson. Artwork by NASCAR artist Sam Bass.
- Date: March 10, 1996
- Official name: 37th Annual Purolator 500
- Location: Hampton, Georgia, Atlanta Motor Speedway
- Course: Permanent racing facility
- Course length: 1.522 miles (2.449 km)
- Distance: 328 laps, 499.216 mi (803.41 km)
- Scheduled distance: 328 laps, 499.216 mi (803.41 km)
- Average speed: 161.298 miles per hour (259.584 km/h)

Pole position
Driver	Johnny Benson Jr.	Bahari Racing
- Time: 29.548

Most laps led
Driver	Dale Earnhardt	Richard Childress Racing
- Laps: 136

Winner
No. 3	Dale Earnhardt	Richard Childress Racing

Television in the United States
- Network: ABC
- Announcers: Bob Jenkins, Benny Parsons

Radio in the United States
- Radio: Performance Racing Network

The 1996 Purolator 500 was the fourth stock car race of the 1996 NASCAR Winston Cup Series and the 37th iteration of the event. The race was held on Sunday, March 10, 1996, in Hampton, Georgia at Atlanta Motor Speedway, a 1.522 miles (2.449 km) permanent asphalt quad-oval intermediate speedway. The race took the scheduled 328 laps to complete. With the help of a fast final pit stop with 38 laps to go, Richard Childress Racing driver Dale Earnhardt would manage to charge to the front and secure his 70th career NASCAR Winston Cup Series victory and his second and final victory of the season. To fill out the top three, Terry Labonte and Jeff Gordon, both drivers for Hendrick Motorsports, would finish second and third, respectively.

== Background ==
The layout of Atlanta Motor Speedway, the circuit where the race was held.

Atlanta Motor Speedway (formerly Atlanta International Raceway) is a 1.522-mile race track in Hampton, Georgia, United States, 20 miles (32 km) south of Atlanta. It has annually hosted NASCAR Winston Cup Series stock car races since its inauguration in 1960.

The venue was bought by Speedway Motorsports in 1990. In 1994, 46 condominiums were built over the northeastern side of the track. In 1997, to standardize the track with Speedway Motorsports' other two intermediate ovals, the entire track was almost completely rebuilt. The frontstretch and backstretch were swapped, and the configuration of the track was changed from oval to quad-oval, with a new official length of 1.54-mile (2.48 km) where before it was 1.522-mile (2.449 km). The project made the track one of the fastest on the NASCAR circuit.

=== Entry list ===
- (R) - denotes rookie driver.

#	Driver	Team	Make
1	Rick Mast	Precision Products Racing	Pontiac
2	Rusty Wallace	Penske Racing South	Ford
3	Dale Earnhardt	Richard Childress Racing	Chevrolet
4	Sterling Marlin	Morgan–McClure Motorsports	Chevrolet
5	Terry Labonte	Hendrick Motorsports	Chevrolet
6	Mark Martin	Roush Racing	Ford
7	Geoff Bodine	Geoff Bodine Racing	Ford
8	Hut Stricklin	Stavola Brothers Racing	Ford
9	Lake Speed	Melling Racing	Ford
10	Ricky Rudd	Rudd Performance Motorsports	Ford
11	Brett Bodine	Brett Bodine Racing	Ford
12	Derrike Cope	Bobby Allison Motorsports	Ford
15	Wally Dallenbach Jr.	Bud Moore Engineering	Ford
16	Ted Musgrave	Roush Racing	Ford
17	Darrell Waltrip	Darrell Waltrip Motorsports	Chevrolet
18	Bobby Labonte	Joe Gibbs Racing	Chevrolet
19	Dick Trickle	TriStar Motorsports	Ford
21	Michael Waltrip	Wood Brothers Racing	Ford
22	Ward Burton	Bill Davis Racing	Pontiac
23	Jimmy Spencer	Haas-Carter Motorsports	Ford
24	Jeff Gordon	Hendrick Motorsports	Chevrolet
25	Ken Schrader	Hendrick Motorsports	Chevrolet
27	Elton Sawyer	David Blair Motorsports	Ford
28	Ernie Irvan	Robert Yates Racing	Ford
29	Steve Grissom	Diamond Ridge Motorsports	Chevrolet
30	Johnny Benson Jr. (R)	Bahari Racing	Pontiac
33	Robert Pressley	Leo Jackson Motorsports	Chevrolet
37	Jeremy Mayfield	Kranefuss-Haas Racing	Ford
41	Ricky Craven	Larry Hedrick Motorsports	Chevrolet
42	Kyle Petty	Team SABCO	Pontiac
43	Bobby Hamilton	Petty Enterprises	Pontiac
65	Steve Seligman	O'Neil Racing	Ford
71	Dave Marcis	Marcis Auto Racing	Chevrolet
75	Morgan Shepherd	Butch Mock Motorsports	Ford
77	Bobby Hillin Jr.	Jasper Motorsports	Ford
78	Randy MacDonald	Triad Motorsports	Ford
81	Kenny Wallace	FILMAR Racing	Ford
87	Joe Nemechek	NEMCO Motorsports	Chevrolet
88	Dale Jarrett	Robert Yates Racing	Ford
90	Mike Wallace	Donlavey Racing	Ford
94	Bill Elliott	Bill Elliott Racing	Ford
95	Chuck Bown	Sadler Brothers Racing	Ford
98	Jeremy Mayfield	Cale Yarborough Motorsports	Ford
99	Jeff Burton	Roush Racing	Ford

== Qualifying ==
Qualifying was split into two rounds. The first round was held on Friday, March 8, at 12:30 PM EST. Each driver would have one lap to set a time. During the first round, the top 25 drivers in the round would be guaranteed a starting spot in the race. If a driver was not able to guarantee a spot in the first round, they had the option to scrub their time from the first round and try and run a faster lap time in a second round qualifying run, held on Saturday, March 9, at 11:00 AM EST. As with the first round, each driver would have one lap to set a time. For this specific race, positions 26-38 would be decided on time, and depending on who needed it, a select amount of positions were given to cars who had not otherwise qualified but were high enough in owner's points.

Johnny Benson Jr., driving for Bahari Racing, would win the pole, setting a time of 29.548 and an average speed of 185.434 miles per hour (298.427 km/h).

Three drivers would fail to qualify: Jeff Burton, Steve Seligman, and Randy MacDonald.

=== Full qualifying results ===
Pos.	#	Driver	Team	Make	Time	Speed
1	30	Johnny Benson Jr. (R)	Bahari Racing	Pontiac	29.548	185.434
2	6	Mark Martin	Roush Racing	Ford	29.588	185.183
3	5	Terry Labonte	Hendrick Motorsports	Chevrolet	29.602	185.096
4	98	Jeremy Mayfield	Cale Yarborough Motorsports	Ford	29.626	184.946
5	7	Geoff Bodine	Geoff Bodine Racing	Ford	29.653	184.777
6	43	Bobby Hamilton	Petty Enterprises	Pontiac	29.658	184.746
7	37	John Andretti	Kranefuss-Haas Racing	Ford	29.696	184.510
8	18	Bobby Labonte	Joe Gibbs Racing	Chevrolet	29.700	184.485
9	8	Hut Stricklin	Stavola Brothers Racing	Ford	29.747	184.193
10	15	Wally Dallenbach Jr.	Bud Moore Engineering	Ford	29.772	184.039
11	9	Lake Speed	Melling Racing	Ford	29.793	183.909
12	87	Joe Nemechek	NEMCO Motorsports	Chevrolet	29.817	183.761
13	17	Darrell Waltrip	Darrell Waltrip Motorsports	Chevrolet	29.851	183.552
14	33	Robert Pressley	Leo Jackson Motorsports	Chevrolet	29.857	183.515
15	41	Ricky Craven	Larry Hedrick Motorsports	Chevrolet	29.860	183.496
16	22	Ward Burton	Bill Davis Racing	Pontiac	29.861	183.490
17	19	Dick Trickle	TriStar Motorsports	Ford	29.867	183.453
18	3	Dale Earnhardt	Richard Childress Racing	Chevrolet	29.870	183.435
19	11	Brett Bodine	Brett Bodine Racing	Ford	29.887	183.331
20	10	Ricky Rudd	Rudd Performance Motorsports	Ford	29.904	183.226
21	24	Jeff Gordon	Hendrick Motorsports	Chevrolet	29.922	183.116
22	2	Rusty Wallace	Penske Racing South	Ford	29.941	183.000
23	94	Bill Elliott	Bill Elliott Racing	Ford	29.952	182.933
24	29	Steve Grissom	Diamond Ridge Motorsports	Chevrolet	29.952	182.933
25	16	Ted Musgrave	Roush Racing	Ford	29.968	182.835
Failed to lock in Round 1
26	12	Derrike Cope	Bobby Allison Motorsports	Ford	29.978	182.774
27	21	Michael Waltrip	Wood Brothers Racing	Ford	30.013	182.561
28	4	Sterling Marlin	Morgan–McClure Motorsports	Chevrolet	30.022	182.506
29	77	Bobby Hillin Jr.	Jasper Motorsports	Ford	30.045	182.366
30	25	Ken Schrader	Hendrick Motorsports	Chevrolet	30.047	182.354
31	1	Rick Mast	Precision Products Racing	Pontiac	30.050	182.336
32	75	Morgan Shepherd	Butch Mock Motorsports	Ford	30.071	182.209
33	42	Kyle Petty	Team SABCO	Pontiac	30.147	181.749
34	95	Chuck Bown	Sadler Brothers Racing	Ford	30.169	181.617
35	27	Elton Sawyer	David Blair Motorsports	Ford	30.173	181.593
36	88	Dale Jarrett	Robert Yates Racing	Ford	30.178	181.563
37	28	Ernie Irvan	Robert Yates Racing	Ford	30.192	181.479
38	81	Kenny Wallace	FILMAR Racing	Ford	30.221	181.304
Provisionals
39	23	Jimmy Spencer	Travis Carter Enterprises	Ford	-*	-*
40	90	Mike Wallace	Donlavey Racing	Ford	-*	-*
41	71	Dave Marcis	Marcis Auto Racing	Chevrolet	-*	-*
Failed to qualify
42	99	Jeff Burton	Roush Racing	Ford	-*	-*
43	65	Steve Seligman	O'Neil Racing	Ford	-*	-*
44	78	Randy MacDonald	Triad Motorsports	Ford	-*	-*
Official first round qualifying results
Official starting lineup

== Race results ==
Fin	St	#	Driver	Team	Make	Laps	Led	Status	Pts	Winnings
1	18	3	Dale Earnhardt	Richard Childress Racing	Chevrolet	328	136	running	185	$91,050
2	3	5	Terry Labonte	Hendrick Motorsports	Chevrolet	328	100	running	175	$60,500
3	21	24	Jeff Gordon	Hendrick Motorsports	Chevrolet	328	24	running	170	$61,600
4	37	28	Ernie Irvan	Robert Yates Racing	Ford	328	6	running	165	$40,400
5	4	98	Jeremy Mayfield	Cale Yarborough Motorsports	Ford	328	4	running	160	$32,100
6	30	25	Ken Schrader	Hendrick Motorsports	Chevrolet	328	5	running	155	$28,500
7	39	23	Jimmy Spencer	Travis Carter Enterprises	Ford	327	0	running	146	$27,150
8	20	10	Ricky Rudd	Rudd Performance Motorsports	Ford	327	1	running	147	$29,650
9	27	21	Michael Waltrip	Wood Brothers Racing	Ford	327	2	running	143	$25,450
10	23	94	Bill Elliott	Bill Elliott Racing	Ford	327	7	running	139	$27,950
11	36	88	Dale Jarrett	Robert Yates Racing	Ford	326	0	running	130	$20,820
12	15	41	Ricky Craven	Larry Hedrick Motorsports	Chevrolet	326	0	running	127	$23,600
13	28	4	Sterling Marlin	Morgan–McClure Motorsports	Chevrolet	325	0	running	124	$28,780
14	17	19	Dick Trickle	TriStar Motorsports	Ford	325	0	running	121	$12,060
15	16	22	Ward Burton	Bill Davis Racing	Pontiac	325	0	running	118	$28,030
16	6	43	Bobby Hamilton	Petty Enterprises	Pontiac	325	0	running	115	$22,870
17	12	87	Joe Nemechek	NEMCO Motorsports	Chevrolet	323	0	running	112	$22,660
18	25	16	Ted Musgrave	Roush Racing	Ford	323	0	running	109	$22,340
19	35	27	Elton Sawyer	David Blair Motorsports	Ford	322	0	running	106	$11,430
20	10	15	Wally Dallenbach Jr.	Bud Moore Engineering	Ford	321	0	running	103	$23,760
21	7	37	John Andretti	Kranefuss-Haas Racing	Ford	320	0	running	100	$21,800
22	33	42	Kyle Petty	Team SABCO	Pontiac	315	0	running	97	$21,640
23	5	7	Geoff Bodine	Geoff Bodine Racing	Ford	314	0	running	94	$21,430
24	19	11	Brett Bodine	Brett Bodine Racing	Ford	314	0	running	91	$21,195
25	9	8	Hut Stricklin	Stavola Brothers Racing	Ford	312	0	running	88	$14,190
26	2	6	Mark Martin	Roush Racing	Ford	300	0	engine	85	$27,535
27	14	33	Robert Pressley	Leo Jackson Motorsports	Chevrolet	297	0	engine	82	$21,725
28	29	77	Bobby Hillin Jr.	Jasper Motorsports	Ford	294	0	running	79	$13,550
29	41	71	Dave Marcis	Marcis Auto Racing	Chevrolet	293	0	running	76	$13,410
30	32	75	Morgan Shepherd	Butch Mock Motorsports	Ford	293	0	running	73	$12,750
31	8	18	Bobby Labonte	Joe Gibbs Racing	Chevrolet	286	4	running	75	$26,190
32	13	17	Darrell Waltrip	Darrell Waltrip Motorsports	Chevrolet	236	0	running	67	$17,130
33	40	90	Mike Wallace	Donlavey Racing	Ford	235	3	engine	69	$10,035
34	31	1	Rick Mast	Precision Products Racing	Pontiac	205	0	engine	61	$17,000
35	26	12	Derrike Cope	Bobby Allison Motorsports	Ford	181	0	overheating	58	$16,965
36	22	2	Rusty Wallace	Penske Racing South	Ford	178	36	engine	60	$25,540
37	38	81	Kenny Wallace	FILMAR Racing	Ford	155	0	engine	52	$9,925
38	1	30	Johnny Benson Jr. (R)	Bahari Racing	Pontiac	107	0	handling	49	$24,345
39	24	29	Steve Grissom	Diamond Ridge Motorsports	Chevrolet	99	0	engine	46	$16,845
40	34	95	Chuck Bown	Sadler Brothers Racing	Ford	85	0	rear end	43	$9,275
41	11	9	Lake Speed	Melling Racing	Ford	29	0	engine	40	$16,845
Failed to qualify
42		99	Jeff Burton	Roush Racing	Ford					
43		65	Steve Seligman	O'Neil Racing	Ford					
44		78	Randy MacDonald	Triad Motorsports	Ford					
Official race results

Previous race: 1996 Pontiac Excitement 400	NASCAR Winston Cup Series; 1996 season	Next race: 1996 TranSouth Financial 400
