= 1996 First Union 400 =

Seventh race of the 1996 NASCAR Winston Cup Series

Race details
- Race 7 of 31 in the 1996 NASCAR Winston Cup Series
- The 1996 First Union 400 program cover, featuring Dale Earnhardt.
- Date: April 14, 1996
- Official name: 46th Annual First Union 400
- Location: North Wilkesboro Speedway, North Wilkesboro, North Carolina
- Course: Permanent racing facility
- Course length: 0.625 miles (1.006 km)
- Distance: 400 laps, 250 mi (402.336 km)
- Average speed: 96.37 miles per hour (155.09 km/h)

Pole position
Driver	Terry Labonte	Hendrick Motorsports
- Time: 19.287

Most laps led
Driver	Terry Labonte	Hendrick Motorsports
- Laps: 167

Winner
No. 5	Terry Labonte	Hendrick Motorsports

Television in the United States
- Network: ESPN
- Announcers: Bob Jenkins, Ned Jarrett, Benny Parsons

Radio in the United States
- Radio: MRN

The 1996 First Union 400 was the seventh stock car race of the 1996 NASCAR Winston Cup Series and the 46th and to date, final iteration of the event. The race was held on Sunday, April 14, 1996, in North Wilkesboro, North Carolina at the North Wilkesboro Speedway, a 0.625 miles (1.006 km) oval short track. The race took the scheduled 400 laps to complete. In the final laps of the race, Hendrick Motorsports driver Terry Labonte would manage to take advantage of a late-race restart with 20 to go and pull away to take his 17th career NASCAR Winston Cup Series victory and his first victory of the season. To fill out the top three, Hendrick Motorsports driver Jeff Gordon and Richard Childress Racing driver Dale Earnhardt would finish second and third, respectively.

== Background ==
The layout of North Wilkesboro Speedway, the venue where the race was held.

North Wilkesboro Speedway is a short oval racetrack located on U.S. Route 421, about five miles east of the town of North Wilkesboro, North Carolina, or 80 miles north of Charlotte. It measures 0.625 mi (1.006 km) and features a unique uphill backstretch and downhill frontstretch. It has previously held races in NASCAR's top three series, including 93 Winston Cup Series races. The track, a NASCAR original, operated from 1949, NASCAR's inception, until the track's original closure in 1996. The speedway briefly reopened in 2010 and hosted several stock car series races before closing again in the spring of 2011. It was re-opened in August 2022 for grassroots racing.

=== Entry list ===
- (R) denotes rookie driver.

#	Driver	Team	Make
1	Rick Mast	Precision Products Racing	Pontiac
2	Rusty Wallace	Penske Racing South	Ford
3	Dale Earnhardt	Richard Childress Racing	Chevrolet
4	Sterling Marlin	Morgan–McClure Motorsports	Chevrolet
5	Terry Labonte	Hendrick Motorsports	Chevrolet
6	Mark Martin	Roush Racing	Ford
7	Geoff Bodine	Geoff Bodine Racing	Ford
8	Hut Stricklin	Stavola Brothers Racing	Ford
9	Lake Speed	Melling Racing	Ford
10	Ricky Rudd	Rudd Performance Motorsports	Ford
11	Brett Bodine	Brett Bodine Racing	Ford
12	Derrike Cope	Bobby Allison Motorsports	Ford
15	Wally Dallenbach Jr.	Bud Moore Engineering	Ford
16	Ted Musgrave	Roush Racing	Ford
17	Darrell Waltrip	Darrell Waltrip Motorsports	Chevrolet
18	Bobby Labonte	Joe Gibbs Racing	Chevrolet
19	Dick Trickle	TriStar Motorsports	Ford
21	Michael Waltrip	Wood Brothers Racing	Ford
22	Ward Burton	Bill Davis Racing	Pontiac
23	Jimmy Spencer	Haas-Carter Motorsports	Ford
24	Jeff Gordon	Hendrick Motorsports	Chevrolet
25	Ken Schrader	Hendrick Motorsports	Chevrolet
27	Elton Sawyer	David Blair Motorsports	Ford
28	Ernie Irvan	Robert Yates Racing	Ford
29	Steve Grissom	Diamond Ridge Motorsports	Chevrolet
30	Johnny Benson Jr. (R)	Bahari Racing	Pontiac
33	Robert Pressley	Leo Jackson Motorsports	Chevrolet
37	Jeremy Mayfield	Kranefuss-Haas Racing	Ford
41	Ricky Craven	Larry Hedrick Motorsports	Chevrolet
42	Kyle Petty	Team SABCO	Pontiac
43	Bobby Hamilton	Petty Enterprises	Pontiac
71	Dave Marcis	Marcis Auto Racing	Chevrolet
75	Morgan Shepherd	Butch Mock Motorsports	Ford
77	Bobby Hillin Jr.	Jasper Motorsports	Ford
78	Randy MacDonald	Triad Motorsports	Ford
81	Kenny Wallace	FILMAR Racing	Ford
87	Joe Nemechek	NEMCO Motorsports	Chevrolet
88	Dale Jarrett	Robert Yates Racing	Ford
90	Mike Wallace	Donlavey Racing	Ford
94	Bill Elliott	Bill Elliott Racing	Ford
98	Jeremy Mayfield	Cale Yarborough Motorsports	Ford
99	Jeff Burton	Roush Racing	Ford

== Qualifying ==
Qualifying was split into two rounds. The first round was held on Friday, April 12, at 3:00 PM EST. Each driver would have one lap to set a time. During the first round, the top 25 drivers in the round would be guaranteed a starting spot in the race. If a driver was not able to guarantee a spot in the first round, they had the option to scrub their time from the first round and try and run a faster lap time in a second round qualifying run, held on Saturday, April 13, at 9:30 AM EST. As with the first round, each driver would have one lap to set a time. For this specific race, positions 26-32 would be decided on time, and depending on who needed it, a select amount of positions were given to cars who had not otherwise qualified but were high enough in owner's points.

Terry Labonte, driving for Hendrick Motorsports, would win the pole, setting a time of 19.287 and an average speed of 116.659 miles per hour (187.744 km/h).

Five drivers would fail to qualify: Dave Marcis, Randy MacDonald, Mike Wallace, Ward Burton, and Bobby Hillin Jr.

=== Full qualifying results ===
Pos.	#	Driver	Team	Make	Time	Speed
1	5	Terry Labonte	Hendrick Motorsports	Chevrolet	19.287	116.659
2	27	Elton Sawyer	David Blair Motorsports	Ford	19.370	116.159
3	6	Mark Martin	Roush Racing	Ford	19.373	116.141
4	43	Bobby Hamilton	Petty Enterprises	Pontiac	19.375	116.129
5	25	Ken Schrader	Hendrick Motorsports	Chevrolet	19.382	116.087
6	16	Ted Musgrave	Roush Racing	Ford	19.405	115.949
7	41	Ricky Craven	Larry Hedrick Motorsports	Chevrolet	19.414	115.896
8	4	Sterling Marlin	Morgan–McClure Motorsports	Chevrolet	19.437	115.759
9	99	Jeff Burton	Roush Racing	Ford	19.437	115.759
10	98	Jeremy Mayfield	Cale Yarborough Motorsports	Ford	19.443	115.723
11	33	Robert Pressley	Leo Jackson Motorsports	Chevrolet	19.457	115.640
12	2	Rusty Wallace	Penske Racing South	Ford	19.469	115.568
13	42	Kyle Petty	Team SABCO	Pontiac	19.472	115.551
14	9	Lake Speed	Melling Racing	Ford	19.480	115.503
15	12	Derrike Cope	Bobby Allison Motorsports	Ford	19.489	115.450
16	81	Kenny Wallace	FILMAR Racing	Ford	19.506	115.349
17	24	Jeff Gordon	Hendrick Motorsports	Chevrolet	19.511	115.320
18	23	Jimmy Spencer	Travis Carter Enterprises	Ford	19.512	115.314
19	11	Brett Bodine	Brett Bodine Racing	Ford	19.536	115.172
20	37	John Andretti	Kranefuss-Haas Racing	Ford	19.537	115.166
21	75	Morgan Shepherd	Butch Mock Motorsports	Ford	19.539	115.154
22	28	Ernie Irvan	Robert Yates Racing	Ford	19.540	115.148
23	15	Wally Dallenbach Jr.	Bud Moore Engineering	Ford	19.544	115.125
24	30	Johnny Benson Jr. (R)	Bahari Racing	Pontiac	19.544	115.125
25	29	Steve Grissom	Diamond Ridge Motorsports	Chevrolet	19.557	115.048
Failed to lock in Round 1
26	3	Dale Earnhardt	Richard Childress Racing	Chevrolet	19.560	115.031
27	7	Geoff Bodine	Geoff Bodine Racing	Ford	19.570	114.972
28	18	Bobby Labonte	Joe Gibbs Racing	Chevrolet	19.601	114.790
29	88	Dale Jarrett	Robert Yates Racing	Ford	19.604	114.772
30	17	Darrell Waltrip	Darrell Waltrip Motorsports	Chevrolet	19.610	114.737
31	1	Rick Mast	Precision Products Racing	Pontiac	19.634	114.597
32	19	Dick Trickle	TriStar Motorsports	Ford	19.636	114.585
Provisionals
33	10	Ricky Rudd	Rudd Performance Motorsports	Ford	-*	-*
34	21	Michael Waltrip	Wood Brothers Racing	Ford	-*	-*
35	8	Hut Stricklin	Stavola Brothers Racing	Ford	-*	-*
36	87	Joe Nemechek	NEMCO Motorsports	Chevrolet	-*	-*
Champion's Provisional
37	94	Bill Elliott	Bill Elliott Racing	Ford	-*	-*
Failed to qualify
38	71	Dave Marcis	Marcis Auto Racing	Chevrolet	-*	-*
39	78	Randy MacDonald	Triad Motorsports	Ford	-*	-*
40	90	Mike Wallace	Donlavey Racing	Ford	-*	-*
41	22	Ward Burton	Bill Davis Racing	Pontiac	-*	-*
42	77	Bobby Hillin Jr.	Jasper Motorsports	Ford	-*	-*
Official first round qualifying results
Official qualifying results

== Race results ==
Fin	St	#	Driver	Team	Make	Laps	Led	Status	Pts	Winnings
1	1	5	Terry Labonte	Hendrick Motorsports	Chevrolet	400	167	running	185	$229,025
2	17	24	Jeff Gordon	Hendrick Motorsports	Chevrolet	400	0	running	170	$52,750
3	26	3	Dale Earnhardt	Richard Childress Racing	Chevrolet	400	0	running	165	$38,525
4	11	33	Robert Pressley	Leo Jackson Motorsports	Chevrolet	400	43	running	165	$35,305
5	8	4	Sterling Marlin	Morgan–McClure Motorsports	Chevrolet	400	64	running	160	$31,855
6	22	28	Ernie Irvan	Robert Yates Racing	Ford	399	1	running	155	$22,755
7	7	41	Ricky Craven	Larry Hedrick Motorsports	Chevrolet	399	2	running	151	$24,980
8	4	43	Bobby Hamilton	Petty Enterprises	Pontiac	398	0	running	142	$20,815
9	5	25	Ken Schrader	Hendrick Motorsports	Chevrolet	398	0	running	138	$20,390
10	28	18	Bobby Labonte	Joe Gibbs Racing	Chevrolet	398	0	running	134	$29,170
11	29	88	Dale Jarrett	Robert Yates Racing	Ford	398	0	running	130	$16,615
12	6	16	Ted Musgrave	Roush Racing	Ford	398	1	running	132	$19,740
13	15	12	Derrike Cope	Bobby Allison Motorsports	Ford	398	0	running	124	$19,425
14	31	1	Rick Mast	Precision Products Racing	Pontiac	398	0	running	121	$19,190
15	33	10	Ricky Rudd	Rudd Performance Motorsports	Ford	397	0	running	118	$24,140
16	35	8	Hut Stricklin	Stavola Brothers Racing	Ford	397	0	running	115	$13,890
17	34	21	Michael Waltrip	Wood Brothers Racing	Ford	397	0	running	112	$20,590
18	16	81	Kenny Wallace	FILMAR Racing	Ford	397	0	running	109	$7,765
19	27	7	Geoff Bodine	Geoff Bodine Racing	Ford	397	0	running	106	$18,415
20	10	98	Jeremy Mayfield	Cale Yarborough Motorsports	Ford	396	0	running	103	$13,115
21	37	94	Bill Elliott	Bill Elliott Racing	Ford	396	0	running	100	$18,065
22	32	19	Dick Trickle	TriStar Motorsports	Ford	395	0	running	97	$7,515
23	19	11	Brett Bodine	Brett Bodine Racing	Ford	395	0	running	94	$17,765
24	24	30	Johnny Benson Jr. (R)	Bahari Racing	Pontiac	394	0	running	91	$18,615
25	30	17	Darrell Waltrip	Darrell Waltrip Motorsports	Chevrolet	394	0	running	88	$17,640
26	25	29	Steve Grissom	Diamond Ridge Motorsports	Chevrolet	394	0	running	85	$17,290
27	21	75	Morgan Shepherd	Butch Mock Motorsports	Ford	394	2	running	87	$10,140
28	23	15	Wally Dallenbach Jr.	Bud Moore Engineering	Ford	394	0	running	79	$17,075
29	9	99	Jeff Burton	Roush Racing	Ford	394	0	running	76	$7,090
30	13	42	Kyle Petty	Team SABCO	Pontiac	394	0	running	73	$16,215
31	18	23	Jimmy Spencer	Travis Carter Enterprises	Ford	392	0	running	70	$13,640
32	2	27	Elton Sawyer	David Blair Motorsports	Ford	391	0	running	67	$6,615
33	12	2	Rusty Wallace	Penske Racing South	Ford	390	119	running	69	$21,615
34	20	37	John Andretti	Kranefuss-Haas Racing	Ford	368	1	crash	66	$14,590
35	14	9	Lake Speed	Melling Racing	Ford	368	0	running	58	$13,590
36	36	87	Joe Nemechek	NEMCO Motorsports	Chevrolet	367	0	crash	55	$13,565
37	3	6	Mark Martin	Roush Racing	Ford	355	0	running	52	$23,415
Official race results

Previous race: 1996 Food City 500	NASCAR Winston Cup Series; 1996 season	Next race: 1996 Goody's Headache Powder 500 (Martinsville)
