= 1996 Food City 500 =

Sixth race of the 1996 NASCAR Winston Cup Series

Race details
- Race 6 of 31 in the 1996 NASCAR Winston Cup Series
- The 1996 Food City 500 program cover, featuring Dale Earnhardt. Artwork by Sam Bass.
- Date: March 31, 1996
- Official name: 36th Annual Food City 500
- Location: Bristol, Tennessee, Bristol Motor Speedway
- Course: Permanent racing facility
- Course length: 0.533 miles (0.858 km)
- Distance: 342 laps, 182.286 mi (293.36 km)
- Scheduled distance: 500 laps, 266.5 mi (428.89 km)
- Average speed: 91.308 miles per hour (146.946 km/h)

Pole position
Driver	Mark Martin	Roush Racing
- Time: 15.527

Most laps led
Driver	Jeff Gordon	Hendrick Motorsports
- Laps: 148

Winner
No. 24	Jeff Gordon	Hendrick Motorsports

Television in the United States
- Network: ESPN
- Announcers: Bob Jenkins, Ned Jarrett, Benny Parsons

Radio in the United States
- Radio: MRN

The 1996 Food City 500 was the sixth stock car race of the 1996 NASCAR Winston Cup Series and the 36th iteration of the event. The race was held on Sunday, March 31, 1996, in Bristol, Tennessee at Bristol Motor Speedway, a 0.533 miles (0.858 km) permanent oval-shaped racetrack. The race was shortened from its scheduled 500 laps to 342 laps due to rain. At race's end, Hendrick Motorsports driver Jeff Gordon would manage to dominate a majority of the race to take his 12th career NASCAR Winston Cup Series victory and his third victory of the season. To fill out the top three, Hendrick Motorsports driver Terry Labonte and Roush Racing driver Mark Martin would finish second and third, respectively.

== Background ==
The layout of Bristol Motor Speedway, the venue where the race was held.

The Bristol Motor Speedway, formerly known as Bristol International Raceway and Bristol Raceway, is a NASCAR short track venue located in Bristol, Tennessee. Constructed in 1960, it held its first NASCAR race on July 30, 1961. Despite its short length, Bristol is among the most popular tracks on the NASCAR schedule because of its distinct features, which include extraordinarily steep banking, an all concrete surface, two pit roads, and stadium-like seating. It has also been named one of the loudest NASCAR tracks.

=== Entry list ===
- (R) denotes rookie driver.

#	Driver	Team	Make
1	Rick Mast	Precision Products Racing	Pontiac
2	Rusty Wallace	Penske Racing South	Ford
3	Dale Earnhardt	Richard Childress Racing	Chevrolet
4	Sterling Marlin	Morgan–McClure Motorsports	Chevrolet
5	Terry Labonte	Hendrick Motorsports	Chevrolet
6	Mark Martin	Roush Racing	Ford
7	Geoff Bodine	Geoff Bodine Racing	Ford
8	Hut Stricklin	Stavola Brothers Racing	Ford
9	Lake Speed	Melling Racing	Ford
10	Ricky Rudd	Rudd Performance Motorsports	Ford
11	Brett Bodine	Brett Bodine Racing	Ford
12	Derrike Cope	Bobby Allison Motorsports	Ford
15	Wally Dallenbach Jr.	Bud Moore Engineering	Ford
16	Ted Musgrave	Roush Racing	Ford
17	Darrell Waltrip	Darrell Waltrip Motorsports	Chevrolet
18	Bobby Labonte	Joe Gibbs Racing	Chevrolet
19	Dick Trickle	TriStar Motorsports	Ford
21	Michael Waltrip	Wood Brothers Racing	Ford
22	Ward Burton	Bill Davis Racing	Pontiac
23	Jimmy Spencer	Haas-Carter Motorsports	Ford
24	Jeff Gordon	Hendrick Motorsports	Chevrolet
25	Ken Schrader	Hendrick Motorsports	Chevrolet
27	Elton Sawyer	David Blair Motorsports	Ford
28	Ernie Irvan	Robert Yates Racing	Ford
29	Steve Grissom	Diamond Ridge Motorsports	Chevrolet
30	Johnny Benson Jr. (R)	Bahari Racing	Pontiac
31	Mike Skinner	Richard Childress Racing	Chevrolet
33	Robert Pressley	Leo Jackson Motorsports	Chevrolet
37	Jeremy Mayfield	Kranefuss-Haas Racing	Ford
41	Ricky Craven	Larry Hedrick Motorsports	Chevrolet
42	Kyle Petty	Team SABCO	Pontiac
43	Bobby Hamilton	Petty Enterprises	Pontiac
71	Dave Marcis	Marcis Auto Racing	Chevrolet
75	Morgan Shepherd	Butch Mock Motorsports	Ford
77	Bobby Hillin Jr.	Jasper Motorsports	Ford
81	Kenny Wallace	FILMAR Racing	Ford
87	Joe Nemechek	NEMCO Motorsports	Chevrolet
88	Dale Jarrett	Robert Yates Racing	Ford
90	Mike Wallace	Donlavey Racing	Ford
94	Bill Elliott	Bill Elliott Racing	Ford
95	Chuck Bown	Sadler Brothers Racing	Ford
98	Jeremy Mayfield	Cale Yarborough Motorsports	Ford
99	Jeff Burton	Roush Racing	Ford

== Qualifying ==
Qualifying was split into two rounds. The first round was held on Friday, March 29, at 3:00 PM EST. Each driver would have one lap to set a time. During the first round, the top 25 drivers in the round would be guaranteed a starting spot in the race. If a driver was not able to guarantee a spot in the first round, they had the option to scrub their time from the first round and try and run a faster lap time in a second round qualifying run, held on Saturday, March 30, at 12:30 PM EST. As with the first round, each driver would have one lap to set a time. For this specific race, positions 26-32 would be decided on time, and depending on who needed it, a select amount of positions were given to cars who had not otherwise qualified but were high enough in owner's points.

Mark Martin, driving for Roush Racing, would win the pole, setting a time of 15.527 and an average speed of 123.578 miles per hour (198.880 km/h).

Six drivers would fail to qualify: Mike Wallace, John Andretti, Johnny Benson Jr., Dave Marcis, Bobby Hillin Jr., and Chuck Bown.

=== Full qualifying results ===
Pos.	#	Driver	Team	Make	Time	Speed
1	6	Mark Martin	Roush Racing	Ford	15.527	123.578
2	5	Terry Labonte	Hendrick Motorsports	Chevrolet	15.610	122.921
3	17	Darrell Waltrip	Darrell Waltrip Motorsports	Chevrolet	15.627	122.787
4	4	Sterling Marlin	Morgan–McClure Motorsports	Chevrolet	15.637	122.709
5	18	Bobby Labonte	Joe Gibbs Racing	Chevrolet	15.653	122.584
6	31	Mike Skinner	Richard Childress Racing	Chevrolet	15.653	122.584
7	88	Dale Jarrett	Robert Yates Racing	Ford	15.657	122.552
8	24	Jeff Gordon	Hendrick Motorsports	Chevrolet	15.677	122.396
9	10	Ricky Rudd	Rudd Performance Motorsports	Ford	15.678	122.388
10	81	Kenny Wallace	FILMAR Racing	Ford	15.690	122.294
11	2	Rusty Wallace	Penske Racing South	Ford	15.704	122.185
12	22	Ward Burton	Bill Davis Racing	Pontiac	15.709	122.147
13	41	Ricky Craven	Larry Hedrick Motorsports	Chevrolet	15.710	122.139
14	8	Hut Stricklin	Stavola Brothers Racing	Ford	15.713	122.115
15	23	Jimmy Spencer	Travis Carter Enterprises	Ford	15.716	122.092
16	28	Ernie Irvan	Robert Yates Racing	Ford	15.726	122.014
17	12	Derrike Cope	Bobby Allison Motorsports	Ford	15.727	122.007
18	75	Morgan Shepherd	Butch Mock Motorsports	Ford	15.728	121.999
19	3	Dale Earnhardt	Richard Childress Racing	Chevrolet	15.730	121.983
20	87	Joe Nemechek	NEMCO Motorsports	Chevrolet	15.743	121.883
21	7	Geoff Bodine	Geoff Bodine Racing	Ford	15.744	121.875
22	11	Brett Bodine	Brett Bodine Racing	Ford	15.760	121.751
23	33	Robert Pressley	Leo Jackson Motorsports	Chevrolet	15.761	121.744
24	43	Bobby Hamilton	Petty Enterprises	Pontiac	15.765	121.713
25	21	Michael Waltrip	Wood Brothers Racing	Ford	15.770	121.674
Failed to lock in Round 1
26	9	Lake Speed	Melling Racing	Ford	15.774	121.643
27	27	Elton Sawyer	David Blair Motorsports	Ford	15.790	121.520
28	25	Ken Schrader	Hendrick Motorsports	Chevrolet	15.791	121.512
29	19	Dick Trickle	TriStar Motorsports	Ford	15.804	121.412
30	16	Ted Musgrave	Roush Racing	Ford	15.806	121.397
31	15	Wally Dallenbach Jr.	Bud Moore Engineering	Ford	15.832	121.198
32	1	Rick Mast	Precision Products Racing	Pontiac	15.838	121.152
Provisionals
33	99	Jeff Burton	Roush Racing	Ford	15.947	120.324
34	42	Kyle Petty	Team SABCO	Pontiac	15.989	120.008
35	98	Jeremy Mayfield	Cale Yarborough Motorsports	Ford	15.856	121.014
36	29	Steve Grissom	Diamond Ridge Motorsports	Chevrolet	15.864	120.953
37	94	Bill Elliott	Bill Elliott Racing	Ford	15.991	119.992
Failed to qualify
38	90	Mike Wallace	Donlavey Racing	Ford	-*	-*
39	37	John Andretti	Kranefuss-Haas Racing	Ford	-*	-*
40	30	Johnny Benson Jr. (R)	Bahari Racing	Pontiac	-*	-*
41	71	Dave Marcis	Marcis Auto Racing	Chevrolet	-*	-*
42	77	Bobby Hillin Jr.	Jasper Motorsports	Ford	-*	-*
43	95	Chuck Bown	Sadler Brothers Racing	Ford	-*	-*
Official first round qualifying results
Official starting lineup

== Race results ==
Fin	St	#	Driver	Team	Make	Laps	Led	Status	Pts	Winnings
1	8	24	Jeff Gordon	Hendrick Motorsports	Chevrolet	342	148	running	185	$93,765
2	2	5	Terry Labonte	Hendrick Motorsports	Chevrolet	342	0	running	170	$54,215
3	1	6	Mark Martin	Roush Racing	Ford	342	59	running	170	$44,815
4	19	3	Dale Earnhardt	Richard Childress Racing	Chevrolet	342	0	running	160	$35,351
5	11	2	Rusty Wallace	Penske Racing South	Ford	342	76	running	160	$29,895
6	7	88	Dale Jarrett	Robert Yates Racing	Ford	342	0	running	150	$26,395
7	5	18	Bobby Labonte	Joe Gibbs Racing	Chevrolet	341	2	running	151	$28,895
8	29	19	Dick Trickle	TriStar Motorsports	Ford	341	0	running	142	$15,495
9	13	41	Ricky Craven	Larry Hedrick Motorsports	Chevrolet	341	0	running	138	$25,190
10	25	21	Michael Waltrip	Wood Brothers Racing	Ford	340	0	running	134	$27,040
11	14	8	Hut Stricklin	Stavola Brothers Racing	Ford	340	0	running	130	$16,190
12	32	1	Rick Mast	Precision Products Racing	Pontiac	340	0	running	127	$23,340
13	15	23	Jimmy Spencer	Travis Carter Enterprises	Ford	340	0	running	124	$22,565
14	9	10	Ricky Rudd	Rudd Performance Motorsports	Ford	340	9	running	126	$26,115
15	34	42	Kyle Petty	Team SABCO	Pontiac	340	0	running	118	$23,265
16	16	28	Ernie Irvan	Robert Yates Racing	Ford	340	0	running	115	$25,890
17	23	33	Robert Pressley	Leo Jackson Motorsports	Chevrolet	340	0	running	112	$21,940
18	4	4	Sterling Marlin	Morgan–McClure Motorsports	Chevrolet	340	0	running	109	$27,490
19	21	7	Geoff Bodine	Geoff Bodine Racing	Ford	340	0	running	106	$14,780
20	22	11	Brett Bodine	Brett Bodine Racing	Ford	339	0	running	103	$23,321
21	35	98	Jeremy Mayfield	Cale Yarborough Motorsports	Ford	338	0	running	100	$14,215
22	17	12	Derrike Cope	Bobby Allison Motorsports	Ford	338	0	running	97	$21,065
23	33	99	Jeff Burton	Roush Racing	Ford	338	0	running	94	$10,415
24	31	15	Wally Dallenbach Jr.	Bud Moore Engineering	Ford	338	0	running	91	$20,840
25	30	16	Ted Musgrave	Roush Racing	Ford	336	0	running	88	$20,895
26	3	17	Darrell Waltrip	Darrell Waltrip Motorsports	Chevrolet	333	0	crash	85	$21,865
27	36	29	Steve Grissom	Diamond Ridge Motorsports	Chevrolet	326	0	running	82	$20,441
28	37	94	Bill Elliott	Bill Elliott Racing	Ford	324	38	running	84	$20,290
29	28	25	Ken Schrader	Hendrick Motorsports	Chevrolet	305	0	running	76	$20,160
30	18	75	Morgan Shepherd	Butch Mock Motorsports	Ford	304	0	running	73	$12,835
31	20	87	Joe Nemechek	NEMCO Motorsports	Chevrolet	261	0	running	70	$18,835
32	24	43	Bobby Hamilton	Petty Enterprises	Pontiac	203	0	running	67	$15,835
33	12	22	Ward Burton	Bill Davis Racing	Pontiac	200	0	running	64	$24,785
34	10	81	Kenny Wallace	FILMAR Racing	Ford	184	0	running	61	$8,835
35	26	9	Lake Speed	Melling Racing	Ford	152	0	running	58	$15,835
36	6	31	Mike Skinner	Richard Childress Racing	Chevrolet	72	10	crash	60	$8,835
37	27	27	Elton Sawyer	David Blair Motorsports	Ford	29	0	crash	52	$8,835
Official race results

Previous race: 1996 TranSouth Financial 400	NASCAR Winston Cup Series; 1996 season	Next race: 1996 First Union 400
