= 1996 Goody's Headache Powder 500 (Martinsville) =

Eighth race of the 1996 NASCAR Winston Cup Series

Race details
- Race 8 of 31 in the 1996 NASCAR Winston Cup Series
- The 1996 Goody's Headache Powder 500 program cover, featuring Terry Labonte, who had broken the record of most consecutive starts from Richard Petty. Labonte was starting his 514th straight race.
- Date: April 21, 1996
- Official name: 47th Annual Goody's Headache Powder 500
- Location: Martinsville, Virginia, Martinsville Speedway
- Course: Permanent racing facility
- Course length: 0.526 miles (0.847 km)
- Distance: 500 laps, 263 mi (423.257 km)
- Average speed: 81.41 miles per hour (131.02 km/h)

Pole position
Driver	Ricky Craven	Larry Hedrick Motorsports
- Time: 20.344

Most laps led
Driver	Jeff Gordon	Hendrick Motorsports
- Laps: 211

Winner
No. 2	Rusty Wallace	Penske Racing South

Television in the United States
- Network: ESPN
- Announcers: Bob Jenkins, Ned Jarrett, Benny Parsons

Radio in the United States
- Radio: Motor Racing Network

The 1996 Goody's Headache Powder 500 was the eighth stock car race of the 1996 NASCAR Winston Cup Series and the 48th iteration of the event. The race was held on Sunday, April 21, 1996, in Martinsville, Virginia at Martinsville Speedway, a 0.526 miles (0.847 km) permanent oval-shaped short track. The race took the scheduled 500 laps to complete. In the final laps of the race, Penske Racing South driver Rusty Wallace would manage to make a late-race pass on Hendrick Motorsports driver Jeff Gordon to take his 42nd career NASCAR Winston Cup Series victory and his first victory of the season. To fill out the top three, Robert Yates Racing driver Ernie Irvan and the aforementioned Jeff Gordon would finish second and third, respectively.

== Background ==
The layout of Martinsville Speedway, the venue where the race was held.

Martinsville Speedway is a NASCAR-owned stock car racing track located in Henry County, in Ridgeway, Virginia, just to the south of Martinsville. At 0.526 miles (0.847 km) in length, it is the shortest track in the NASCAR Cup Series. The track was also one of the first paved oval tracks in NASCAR, being built in 1947 by H. Clay Earles. It is also the only remaining race track that has been on the NASCAR circuit from its beginning in 1948.

=== Entry list ===
- (R) denotes rookie driver.

#	Driver	Team	Make
1	Rick Mast	Precision Products Racing	Pontiac
2	Rusty Wallace	Penske Racing South	Ford
3	Dale Earnhardt	Richard Childress Racing	Chevrolet
4	Sterling Marlin	Morgan–McClure Motorsports	Chevrolet
5	Terry Labonte	Hendrick Motorsports	Chevrolet
6	Mark Martin	Roush Racing	Ford
7	Geoff Bodine	Geoff Bodine Racing	Ford
8	Hut Stricklin	Stavola Brothers Racing	Ford
9	Lake Speed	Melling Racing	Ford
10	Ricky Rudd	Rudd Performance Motorsports	Ford
11	Brett Bodine	Brett Bodine Racing	Ford
12	Derrike Cope	Bobby Allison Motorsports	Ford
15	Wally Dallenbach Jr.	Bud Moore Engineering	Ford
16	Ted Musgrave	Roush Racing	Ford
17	Darrell Waltrip	Darrell Waltrip Motorsports	Chevrolet
18	Bobby Labonte	Joe Gibbs Racing	Chevrolet
19	Dick Trickle	TriStar Motorsports	Ford
21	Michael Waltrip	Wood Brothers Racing	Ford
22	Ward Burton	Bill Davis Racing	Pontiac
23	Jimmy Spencer	Haas-Carter Motorsports	Ford
24	Jeff Gordon	Hendrick Motorsports	Chevrolet
25	Ken Schrader	Hendrick Motorsports	Chevrolet
27	Elton Sawyer	David Blair Motorsports	Ford
28	Ernie Irvan	Robert Yates Racing	Ford
29	Steve Grissom	Diamond Ridge Motorsports	Chevrolet
30	Johnny Benson Jr. (R)	Bahari Racing	Pontiac
33	Robert Pressley	Leo Jackson Motorsports	Chevrolet
37	Jeremy Mayfield	Kranefuss-Haas Racing	Ford
41	Ricky Craven	Larry Hedrick Motorsports	Chevrolet
42	Kyle Petty	Team SABCO	Pontiac
43	Bobby Hamilton	Petty Enterprises	Pontiac
46	Stacy Compton	Monroe Racing	Chevrolet
71	Dave Marcis	Marcis Auto Racing	Chevrolet
75	Morgan Shepherd	Butch Mock Motorsports	Ford
77	Bobby Hillin Jr.	Jasper Motorsports	Ford
78	Randy MacDonald	Triad Motorsports	Ford
81	Kenny Wallace	FILMAR Racing	Ford
87	Joe Nemechek	NEMCO Motorsports	Chevrolet
88	Dale Jarrett	Robert Yates Racing	Ford
90	Mike Wallace	Donlavey Racing	Ford
94	Bill Elliott	Bill Elliott Racing	Ford
98	Jeremy Mayfield	Cale Yarborough Motorsports	Ford
99	Jeff Burton	Roush Racing	Ford

== Qualifying ==
Qualifying was split into two rounds. The first round was held on Friday, April 19, at 3:00 PM EST. Each driver would have one lap to set a time. During the first round, the top 25 drivers in the round would be guaranteed a starting spot in the race. If a driver was not able to guarantee a spot in the first round, they had the option to scrub their time from the first round and try and run a faster lap time in a second round qualifying run, held on Saturday, April 20, at 1:00 PM EST. As with the first round, each driver would have one lap to set a time. For this specific race, positions 26-32 would be decided on time, and depending on who needed it, a select amount of positions were given to cars who had not otherwise qualified but were high enough in owner's points.

Ricky Craven, driving for Larry Hedrick Motorsports, would win the pole, setting a time of 20.344 and an average speed of 93.079 miles per hour (149.796 km/h).

Seven drivers would fail to qualify: Randy MacDonald, Elton Sawyer, Steve Grissom, Dick Trickle, Bobby Hillin Jr., Wally Dallenbach Jr., and Ward Burton.

=== Full qualifying results ===
Pos.	#	Driver	Team	Make	Time	Speed
1	41	Ricky Craven	Larry Hedrick Motorsports	Chevrolet	20.344	93.079
2	42	Kyle Petty	Team SABCO	Pontiac	20.359	93.010
3	94	Bill Elliott	Bill Elliott Racing	Ford	20.362	92.997
4	6	Mark Martin	Roush Racing	Ford	20.375	92.937
5	2	Rusty Wallace	Penske Racing South	Ford	20.383	92.901
6	25	Ken Schrader	Hendrick Motorsports	Chevrolet	20.387	92.883
7	5	Terry Labonte	Hendrick Motorsports	Chevrolet	20.389	92.874
8	3	Dale Earnhardt	Richard Childress Racing	Chevrolet	20.395	92.846
9	46	Stacy Compton	Monroe Racing	Chevrolet	20.398	92.833
10	18	Bobby Labonte	Joe Gibbs Racing	Chevrolet	20.411	92.774
11	71	Dave Marcis	Marcis Auto Racing	Chevrolet	20.431	92.683
12	88	Dale Jarrett	Robert Yates Racing	Ford	20.444	92.624
13	24	Jeff Gordon	Hendrick Motorsports	Chevrolet	20.455	92.574
14	12	Derrike Cope	Bobby Allison Motorsports	Ford	20.458	92.560
15	4	Sterling Marlin	Morgan–McClure Motorsports	Chevrolet	20.496	92.389
16	98	Jeremy Mayfield	Cale Yarborough Motorsports	Ford	20.496	92.389
17	37	John Andretti	Kranefuss-Haas Racing	Ford	20.499	92.375
18	30	Johnny Benson Jr. (R)	Bahari Racing	Pontiac	20.501	92.366
19	7	Geoff Bodine	Geoff Bodine Racing	Ford	20.513	92.312
20	75	Morgan Shepherd	Butch Mock Motorsports	Ford	20.520	92.281
21	43	Bobby Hamilton	Petty Enterprises	Pontiac	20.521	92.276
22	90	Mike Wallace	Donlavey Racing	Ford	20.524	92.263
23	17	Darrell Waltrip	Darrell Waltrip Motorsports	Chevrolet	20.528	92.245
24	9	Lake Speed	Melling Racing	Ford	20.541	92.186
25	99	Jeff Burton	Roush Racing	Ford	20.551	92.142
Failed to lock in Round 1
26	1	Rick Mast	Precision Products Racing	Pontiac	20.498	92.380
27	21	Michael Waltrip	Wood Brothers Racing	Ford	20.555	92.124
28	81	Kenny Wallace	FILMAR Racing	Ford	20.555	92.124
29	87	Joe Nemechek	NEMCO Motorsports	Chevrolet	20.557	92.115
30	10	Ricky Rudd	Rudd Performance Motorsports	Ford	20.564	92.083
31	11	Brett Bodine	Wood Brothers Racing	Ford	20.583	91.998
32	23	Jimmy Spencer	Travis Carter Enterprises	Ford	20.595	91.945
Provisionals
33	16	Ted Musgrave	Roush Racing	Ford	-*	-*
34	28	Ernie Irvan	Robert Yates Racing	Ford	-*	-*
35	33	Robert Pressley	Leo Jackson Motorsports	Chevrolet	-*	-*
36	8	Hut Stricklin	Stavola Brothers Racing	Ford	-*	-*
Failed to qualify
37	78	Randy MacDonald	Triad Motorsports	Ford	-*	-*
38	27	Elton Sawyer	David Blair Motorsports	Ford	-*	-*
39	29	Steve Grissom	Diamond Ridge Motorsports	Chevrolet	-*	-*
40	19	Dick Trickle	TriStar Motorsports	Ford	-*	-*
41	77	Bobby Hillin Jr.	Jasper Motorsports	Ford	-*	-*
42	15	Wally Dallenbach Jr.	Bud Moore Engineering	Ford	-*	-*
43	22	Ward Burton	Bill Davis Racing	Pontiac	-*	-*
Official first round qualifying results
Official starting lineup

== Race results ==
Fin	St	#	Driver	Team	Make	Laps	Led	Status	Pts	Winnings
1	5	2	Rusty Wallace	Penske Racing South	Ford	500	164	running	180	$59,245
2	34	28	Ernie Irvan	Robert Yates Racing	Ford	500	2	running	175	$57,395
3	13	24	Jeff Gordon	Hendrick Motorsports	Chevrolet	500	211	running	175	$57,495
4	16	98	Jeremy Mayfield	Cale Yarborough Motorsports	Ford	500	0	running	160	$32,545
5	8	3	Dale Earnhardt	Richard Childress Racing	Chevrolet	500	12	running	160	$35,195
6	21	43	Bobby Hamilton	Petty Enterprises	Pontiac	499	0	running	150	$27,395
7	6	25	Ken Schrader	Hendrick Motorsports	Chevrolet	498	0	running	146	$26,295
8	10	18	Bobby Labonte	Joe Gibbs Racing	Chevrolet	498	0	running	142	$30,185
9	33	16	Ted Musgrave	Roush Racing	Ford	498	0	running	138	$24,985
10	15	4	Sterling Marlin	Morgan–McClure Motorsports	Chevrolet	498	0	running	134	$32,485
11	24	9	Lake Speed	Melling Racing	Ford	498	0	running	130	$23,320
12	1	41	Ricky Craven	Larry Hedrick Motorsports	Chevrolet	498	28	running	132	$28,235
13	3	94	Bill Elliott	Bill Elliott Racing	Ford	497	0	running	124	$23,415
14	28	81	Kenny Wallace	FILMAR Racing	Ford	496	0	running	121	$11,215
15	26	1	Rick Mast	Precision Products Racing	Pontiac	496	0	running	118	$23,715
16	23	17	Darrell Waltrip	Darrell Waltrip Motorsports	Chevrolet	496	0	running	115	$21,815
17	27	21	Michael Waltrip	Wood Brothers Racing	Ford	495	0	running	112	$21,615
18	31	11	Brett Bodine	Wood Brothers Racing	Ford	494	0	running	109	$21,120
19	32	23	Jimmy Spencer	Travis Carter Enterprises	Ford	494	0	running	106	$20,465
20	20	75	Morgan Shepherd	Butch Mock Motorsports	Ford	493	0	running	103	$15,065
21	4	6	Mark Martin	Roush Racing	Ford	493	0	running	100	$27,065
22	25	99	Jeff Burton	Roush Racing	Ford	493	0	running	97	$9,665
23	30	10	Ricky Rudd	Rudd Performance Motorsports	Ford	490	0	running	94	$24,615
24	7	5	Terry Labonte	Hendrick Motorsports	Chevrolet	480	16	brakes	96	$26,965
25	18	30	Johnny Benson Jr. (R)	Bahari Racing	Pontiac	477	0	running	88	$19,965
26	29	87	Joe Nemechek	NEMCO Motorsports	Chevrolet	476	0	running	85	$19,565
27	19	7	Geoff Bodine	Geoff Bodine Racing	Ford	462	0	fuel pump	82	$12,415
28	14	12	Derrike Cope	Bobby Allison Motorsports	Ford	462	0	running	79	$12,215
29	12	88	Dale Jarrett	Robert Yates Racing	Ford	458	0	running	76	$17,115
30	2	42	Kyle Petty	Team SABCO	Pontiac	445	67	running	78	$21,065
31	36	8	Hut Stricklin	Stavola Brothers Racing	Ford	372	0	rear end	70	$11,565
32	22	90	Mike Wallace	Donlavey Racing	Ford	368	0	rear end	67	$9,065
33	9	46	Stacy Compton	Monroe Racing	Chevrolet	353	0	brakes	64	$9,065
34	35	33	Robert Pressley	Leo Jackson Motorsports	Chevrolet	343	0	running	61	$16,065
35	11	71	Dave Marcis	Marcis Auto Racing	Chevrolet	341	0	engine	58	$9,065
36	17	37	John Andretti	Kranefuss-Haas Racing	Ford	338	0	rear end	55	$16,065
Official race results

Previous race: 1996 First Union 400	NASCAR Winston Cup Series; 1996 season	Next race: 1996 Winston Select 500
