= 1996 Daytona 500 =

Auto race run in Florida in 1996

Race details
- Race 1 of 31 in the 1996 NASCAR Winston Cup Series season
- 1996 Daytona 500 logo
- Date: February 18, 1996
- Location: Daytona International Speedway; Daytona Beach, Florida, U.S.
- Course: Permanent racing facility 2.5 mi (4.02336 km)
- Distance: 200 laps, 500 mi (804.672 km)
- Weather: Temperatures reaching up to 63 °F (17 °C); wind speeds approaching 13 miles per hour (21 km/h)
- Average speed: 154.308 miles per hour (248.335 km/h)

Pole position
Driver	Dale Earnhardt	Richard Childress Racing

Qualifying race winners
Duel 1 Winner	Dale Earnhardt	Richard Childress Racing
Duel 2 Winner	Ernie Irvan	Robert Yates Racing

Most laps led
Driver	Terry Labonte	Hendrick Motorsports
- Laps: 44

Winner
No. 88	Dale Jarrett	Robert Yates Racing

Television in the United States
- Network: CBS
- Announcers: Ken Squier, Buddy Baker, and Ned Jarrett
- Nielsen ratings: 9.2/24 (13.9 million viewers)

The 1996 Daytona 500, the 38th running of the event, was run on February 18, 1996, at Daytona International Speedway in Daytona Beach, Florida, as the first race of the 1996 NASCAR Winston Cup season. Dale Jarrett won this race for the second time after winning it in 1993 and for the first (and only) time in all of Daytona 500 history, Dale Earnhardt won the pole position, allowing many to believe that he would finally win the race. Ernie Irvan returned to race full-time alongside Earnhardt (both drivers won their respective Gatorade Twin 125-mile qualifying races).

== Background ==
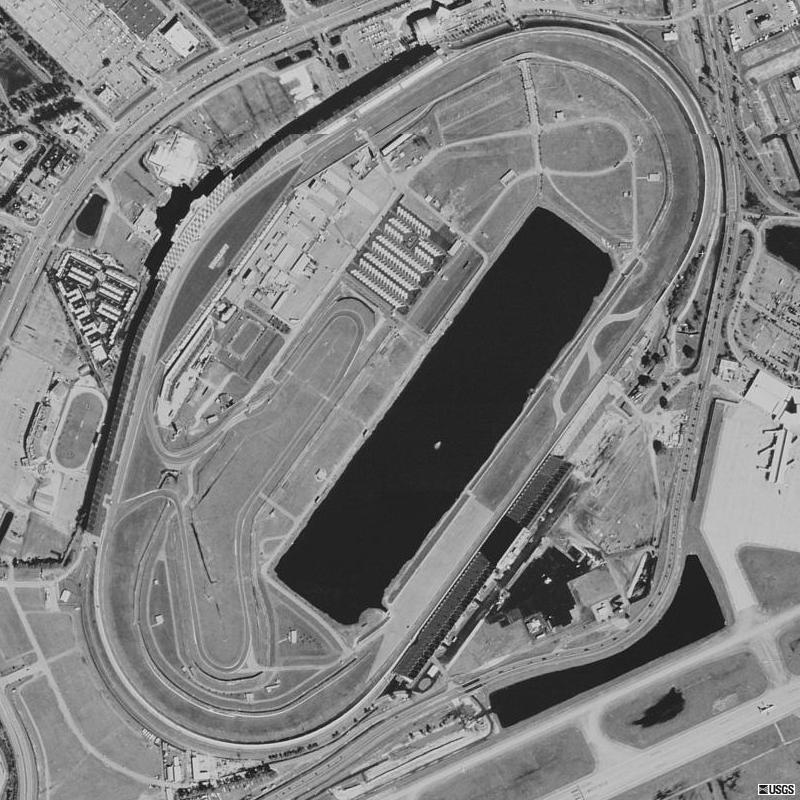
Daytona International Speedway, where the race was held.

Daytona International Speedway is a race track in Daytona Beach, Florida, that is one of six superspeedways to hold NASCAR races. The standard track at Daytona is a four-turn superspeedway that is 2.5 miles (4.0 km) long. The track also features two other layouts that utilize portions of the primary high speed tri-oval, such as a 3.56-mile (5.73 km) sports car course and a 2.95-mile (4.75 km) motorcycle course. The track's 180-acre (73 ha) infield includes the 29-acre (12 ha) Lake Lloyd, which has hosted powerboat racing. The speedway is owned and operated by International Speedway Corporation.

The track was built by NASCAR founder Bill France Sr. to host racing that was being held at the former Daytona Beach and Road Course and opened with the 1959 Daytona 500. The Daytona 500 is regarded as the most important and prestigious race on the NASCAR calendar. It is also the series' first race of the year; this phenomenon is virtually unique in sports, which tend to have championships or other major events at the end of the season rather than the start.

== Race summary ==
=== Opening laps ===
The lead changed four times between Ernie Irvan, Ken Schrader, Sterling Marlin, and Dale Earnhardt in the first five laps. Reigning Winston Cup champion Jeff Gordon was eliminated on lap 8 after getting a light tap from Jeremy Mayfield. Busch Series Goody's 300 winner Steve Grissom, along with Joe Nemechek (both Busch Series champions), Rick Mast, and Rusty Wallace, were involved in a chain reaction incident after Gordon hit the wall. Mast's and Wallace's cars both were relatively undamaged, but Grissom and Nemechek lost several laps after repairs. On lap 29, Earnhardt's ignition failed, triggering a wreck for Ernie Irvan. Wally Dallenbach Jr., who could not see Earnhardt, tagged Irvan and sent him into the wall.

Due to a new rules package, the lead changed hands early and often. On lap 50, no one but Dale Earnhardt or Terry Labonte (the new leader) had spent more than 4 consecutive laps in the lead. Lap 54 saw 1990 race winner Derrike Cope hit the turn 4 wall, which ended his day.

=== Mid-race developments ===
On lap 77, 1994 and 1995 winner Sterling Marlin took the lead away from Terry Labonte and led three laps before having engine problems. Not much later, Labonte began to drop back with overheating issues after leading the most laps at 44. He managed a decent finish, but Marlin almost instantly retired from the lead. IndyCar veteran John Andretti, whose uncle Mario won the 1967 race, became the new leader. He and Earnhardt, along with Bill Elliott, Dale Jarrett, Ken Schrader and Michael Waltrip, were all prime contenders at halfway. The field made green flag pit stops over the next 10 laps. Andretti came in for another pit stop immediately after his scheduled stop because not all of the right rear lugnuts had been tightened. On lap 131, while trying to get his lap back, he had a hard crash in turn 2. Waltrip clipped him as he tried to go past his spinning car, only to damage the right-front fender. The damage seemed to improve the car's aerodynamic qualities. Shortly after the restart, Mike Wallace suddenly snapped loose and collected Loy Allen Jr., Brett Bodine and Bobby Labonte, whose car was relatively undamaged. Only Wallace; Allen Jr.; and Bodine were all done for the day.

=== Run to the finish ===
Geoff Bodine and Lake Speed crashed at lap 159, collecting Bobby Hamilton, Chad Little, Robert Pressley, Jeff Purvis and Morgan Shepherd. This prompted the final pit stops. Dale Jarrett and his crew chief Todd Parrott decided on a four-tire change, while the Richard Childress Racing duo of Earnhardt and David Smith opted for two. Bud Moore, whose car and driver Wally Dallenbach Jr. were not yet sponsored for the season, were going to gamble that their full tank of fuel from the previous caution would be enough to finish. Even so, Dallenbach kept the #15 in the lead pack in the waning laps. Earnhardt quickly dispatched new leader and last year's Rookie of the Year Ricky Craven. He lost the lead briefly to Schrader but at lap 177, Jarrett passed him with four fresh tires. Earnhardt could keep up with Jarrett, but he could not repass him. This would allow Jarrett to win his second Daytona 500 win, followed by Earnhardt, Schrader, Mark Martin and Jeff Burton.

== Results ==
Pos	Grid	Car	Driver	Team	Make	Laps	Led	Status
1	7	88	Dale Jarrett (W)	Robert Yates Racing	Ford	200	40	Running
2	1	3	Dale Earnhardt	Richard Childress Racing	Chevrolet	200	32	Running
3	4	25	Ken Schrader	Hendrick Motorsports	Chevrolet	200	12	Running
4	15	6	Mark Martin	Roush Racing	Ford	200	0	Running
5	16	99	Jeff Burton	Roush Racing	Ford	200	0	Running
6	9	15	Wally Dallenbach Jr.	Bud Moore Engineering	Ford	200	0	running
7	20	16	Ted Musgrave	Roush Racing	Ford	200	0	Running
8	21	94	Bill Elliott (W)	Bill Elliott Racing	Ford	200	29	Running
9	10	10	Ricky Rudd	Rudd Performance Motorsports	Ford	200	0	Running
10	11	21	Michael Waltrip	Wood Brothers Racing	Ford	200	1	Running
11	19	23	Jimmy Spencer	Travis Carter Enterprises	Ford	200	1	Running
12	34	44	Jeff Purvis	Phoenix Racing	Chevrolet	200	0	Running
13	36	41	Ricky Craven	Larry Hedrick Motorsports	Chevrolet	200	0	Running
14	32	9	Lake Speed	Melling Racing	Ford	200	0	Running
15	23	71	Dave Marcis	Marcis Auto Racing	Chevrolet	200	0	Running
16	43	2	Rusty Wallace	Penske Racing South	Ford	200	0	Running
17	35	18	Bobby Labonte	Joe Gibbs Racing	Chevrolet	200	0	Running
18	29	42	Kyle Petty	SABCO Racing	Pontiac	199	0	Flagged
20	39	43	Bobby Hamilton	Petty Enterprises	Pontiac	199	0	Flagged
21	33	81	Kenny Wallace	FILMAR Racing	Ford	199	0	Flagged
22	42	8	Hut Stricklin	Stavola Brothers Racing	Ford	199	0	Flagged
23	27	30	Johnny Benson Jr. (R)	Bahari Racing	Pontiac	197	0	Flagged
24	5	5	Terry Labonte	Hendrick Motorsports	Chevrolet	196	44	Flagged
25	18	27	Elton Sawyer (R)	David Blair Motorsports	Ford	196	0	Flagged
26	13	22	Ward Burton	Bill Davis Racing	Pontiac	195	0	Flagged
27	26	29	Steve Grissom	Diamond Ridge Motorsports	Chevrolet	191	0	Flagged
28	31	1	Rick Mast	Precision Products Racing	Pontiac	190	0	Flagged
29	40	17	Darrell Waltrip (W)	Darrell Waltrip Motorsports	Chevrolet	180	0	Handling
30	25	33	Robert Pressley	Leo Jackson Motorsports	Chevrolet	171	0	Contact TO
31	12	75	Morgan Shepherd	Butch Mock Motorsports	Ford	164	0	Contact TO
32	41	11	Brett Bodine	Brett Bodine Racing	Ford	162	1	Contact BS
33	30	97	Chad Little	Mark Rypien Motorsports	Pontiac	158	0	Contact
34	38	7	Geoff Bodine (W)	Geoff Bodine Racing	Ford	157	0	Contact
35	2	28	Ernie Irvan (W)	Robert Yates Racing	Ford	145	2	Flagged
36	24	19	Loy Allen Jr.	TriStar Motorsports	Ford	135	0	Contact BS
37	17	90	Mike Wallace	Donlavey Racing	Ford	135	0	Contact BS
38	6	37	John Andretti	Kranefuss-Haas Racing	Ford	128	23	Contact BS
39	37	87	Joe Nemechek	NEMCO Motorsports	Chevrolet	86	0	Contact TO
40	3	4	Sterling Marlin (W)	Morgan-McClure Motorsports	Chevrolet	81	3	Engine
41	22	12	Derrike Cope (W)	Bobby Allison Motorsports	Ford	53	0	Contact TO
42	8	24	Jeff Gordon	Hendrick Motorsports	Chevrolet	13	0	Contact TO
43	28	63	Dick Trickle	Schnell Motorsports	Ford	9	0	Engine
Failed to qualify
		65	Steve Seligman (R)	O'Neil Racing	Ford			
		95	Chuck Bown	Sadler Brothers Racing	Ford			
		77	Bobby Hillin Jr.	Jasper Motorsports	Ford			
		73	Tracy Leslie (R)	Barkdoll Racing	Chevrolet			
		0	Delma Cowart	H.L. Waters Racing	Ford			
		57	Jim Bown (R)	Kenova Motorsports	Chevrolet			
		80	Joe Ruttman	Hover Motorsports	Ford			
		72	Jim Sauter	Marcis Auto Racing	Chevrolet			

== Media ==
=== Television ===
The Daytona 500 was covered by CBS for the 18th consecutive time since 1979 in the United States. Ken Squier, two-time NASCAR Cup Series champion Ned Jarrett and 1980 race winner Buddy Baker called the race from the broadcast booth. Mike Joy, David Hobbs and Dick Berggren handled pit road for the television side.

CBS
Booth announcers		Pit reporters
Lap-by-lap	Color-commentators	Pit reporters
Ken Squier	Ned Jarrett; Buddy Baker	Mike Joy; David Hobbs; Dick Berggren

Preceded by 1995 NAPA 500	NASCAR Winston Cup Series season 1995–96	Succeeded by 1996 Goodwrench Service 400
