= 1996 Brickyard 400 =

NASCAR race

Race details
- Race 19 of 31 in the 1996 NASCAR Winston Cup Series
- 1996 Brickyard 400 program cover
- Date: August 3, 1996
- Location: Indianapolis Motor Speedway, Speedway, Indiana
- Course: Permanent racing facility
- Course length: 2.5 miles (4.023 km)
- Distance: 160 laps, 400 mi (643.74 km)
- Weather: Warm with temperatures approaching 82.9 °F (28.3 °C); wind speeds up to 7 miles per hour (11 km/h)
- Average speed: 139.508 mph (224.516 km/h)

Pole position
Driver	Jeff Gordon	Hendrick Motorsports

Most laps led
Driver	Johnny Benson Jr.	Bahari Racing
- Laps: 70

Winner
No. 88	Dale Jarrett	Robert Yates Racing

Television in the United States
- Network: ABC
- Announcers: Danny Sullivan, Bob Jenkins and Benny Parsons
- Nielsen ratings: 4.3/-

The 1996 Brickyard 400, the 3rd running of the event, was a NASCAR Winston Cup Series race held on August 3, 1996, at the Indianapolis Motor Speedway in Speedway, Indiana. The race was the nineteenth of the 1996 NASCAR Winston Cup Series season. Jeff Gordon of Hendrick Motorsports won the pole position with a speed of 176.419 miles per hour (283.919 km/h), while Robert Yates Racing's Dale Jarrett won the race.

The track had been repaved, and speeds had been reported to have increased by 5 miles per hour (8.0 km/h).

== Race ==
Five laps into the race, the first caution flew for a crash involving Greg Sacks, Robert Pressley, Ricky Craven, Dave Marcis, and Bobby Hillin Jr. On lap 23, pole-sitter Jeff Gordon cut his right-front tire and hit the wall; Gordon finished 37th. Subsequently, Johnny Benson Jr. took the lead, and led a race-high 70 laps. Ernie Irvan took the lead from Benson on lap 108, and on lap 126, an error made during a pit stop dropped Benson to 13th. Meanwhile, Dale Jarrett took the lead from his Robert Yates Racing teammate Irvan, who reclaimed the lead on lap 139 after passing Jarrett in turn 3. Jarrett managed to pass Irvan in turn 2 of lap 154, and kept the lead after the race ended under caution due to Pressley crashing in turn 4 on lap 159. Irvan finished second, followed by Terry Labonte, Mark Martin, Morgan Shepherd, Ricky Rudd, Rusty Wallace, Benson, Rick Mast and Bill Elliott.

Afterwards, Jarrett and crew chief Todd Parrott kissed the yard of bricks at the start/finish line, a practice that has continued to be performed in NASCAR, and was eventually also done by Gil de Ferran after his win in the Indianapolis 500 in 2003.

In the points standings after the race, Terry Labonte led with 2792 points, Dale Earnhardt trailed with 2731 points; Jarrett (2729), Jeff Gordon (2688), and Ricky Rudd (2415) rounded out the Top 5.

== Results ==
=== Qualifying ===
No.	Driver	Team	Manufacturer	Time	Speed	Grid
24	Jeff Gordon	Hendrick Motorsports	Chevrolet	51.015	176.419†	1
6	Mark Martin	Roush Racing	Ford	51.159	175.922	2
9	Lake Speed	Melling Racing	Ford	51.183	175.840	3
25	Ken Schrader	Hendrick Motorsports	Chevrolet	51.298	175.445	4
77	Bobby Hillin Jr.	Jasper Motorsports	Ford	51.328	175.343	5
87	Joe Nemechek	NEMCO Motorsports	Chevrolet	51.331	175.333	6
94	Bill Elliott	Bill Elliott Racing	Ford	51.390	175.131	7
1	Rick Mast	Precision Products Racing	Pontiac	51.406	175.077	8
5	Terry Labonte	Hendrick Motorsports	Chevrolet	51.413	175.053	9
29	Greg Sacks	Diamond Ridge Motorsports	Chevrolet	51.439	174.965	10
4	Sterling Marlin	Morgan-McClure Motorsports	Chevrolet	51.443	174.951	11
3	Dale Earnhardt	Richard Childress Racing	Chevrolet	51.455	174.910	12
42	Kyle Petty	Team SABCO	Pontiac	51.455	174.910	13
30	Johnny Benson Jr. #	Bahari Racing	Pontiac	51.465	174.876	14
28	Ernie Irvan	Robert Yates Racing	Ford	51.502	174.750	15
8	Hut Stricklin	Stavola Brothers Racing	Ford	51.513	174.713	16
2	Rusty Wallace	Penske Racing South	Ford	51.515	174.706	17
15	Wally Dallenbach Jr.	Bud Moore Engineering	Ford	51.589	174.456	18
98	Jeremy Mayfield	Cale Yarborough Motorsports	Ford	51.592	174.446	19
23	Jimmy Spencer	Travis Carter Enterprises	Ford	51.597	174.429	20
16	Ted Musgrave	Roush Racing	Ford	51.600	174.419	21
11	Brett Bodine	Brett Bodine Racing	Ford	51.607	174.395	22
18	Bobby Labonte	Joe Gibbs Racing	Chevrolet	51.628	174.324	23
88	Dale Jarrett	Robert Yates Racing	Ford	51.647	174.260	24
90	Dick Trickle	Donlavey Racing	Ford	51.664	174.203	25
95	Gary Bradberry	Sadler Brothers Racing	Ford	51.551	174.584	26‡
37	John Andretti	Kranefuss-Haas Racing	Ford	51.676	174.162	27
99	Jeff Burton	Roush Racing	Ford	51.715	174.031	28
7	Geoff Bodine	Geoff Bodine Racing	Ford	51.785	173.796	29
21	Michael Waltrip	Wood Brothers Racing	Ford	51.873	173.501	30
81	Kenny Wallace	FILMAR Racing	Ford	51.877	173.487	31
22	Ward Burton	Bill Davis Racing	Pontiac	51.941	173.274	32
17	Darrell Waltrip	DarWal Inc.	Chevrolet	51.960	173.210	33
33	Robert Pressley	Leo Jackson Motorsports	Chevrolet	51.971	173.174	34
10	Ricky Rudd	Rudd Performance Motorsports	Ford	51.977	173.154	35
12	Derrike Cope	Bobby Allison Motorsports	Ford	51.977	173.154	36
43	Bobby Hamilton	Petty Enterprises	Pontiac	52.037	172.954	37
75	Morgan Shepherd	RahMoc Enterprises	Ford	52.045	172.927	38
41	Ricky Craven	Larry Hedrick Motorsports	Chevrolet	Provisional		39
71	Dave Marcis	Marcis Auto Racing	Chevrolet	Provisional		40
Failed to Qualify
91	Ron Barfield Jr.	Bill Elliott Racing	Ford	52.101	172.471	
27	Jason Keller	David Blair Motorsports	Ford	52.332	171.979	
78	Randy MacDonald #	Triad Motorsports	Ford	52.532	171.324	
44	Jeff Purvis	Phoenix Racing	Chevrolet	52.535	171.314	
46	Stacy Compton #	Monroe Motorsports	Chevrolet	52.611	171.067	
02	Robbie Faggart	Miles Motorsports	Chevrolet	52.668	170.882	
50	A. J. Foyt	A. J. Foyt Enterprises	Ford	52.818	170.396	
57	Steve Seligman	Team III Motorsports	Ford	53.663	167.713	
# Rookie of the Year candidate / † New track record / ‡ Fastest second round qualifier Source:

=== Race results ===
Pos	Grid	No.	Driver	Team	Manufacturer	Laps	Points
1	24	88	Dale Jarrett	Robert Yates Racing	Ford	160	180
2	15	28	Ernie Irvan	Robert Yates Racing	Ford	160	175
3	9	5	Terry Labonte	Hendrick Motorsports	Chevrolet	160	170
4	2	6	Mark Martin	Roush Racing	Ford	160	165
5	38	75	Morgan Shepherd	RahMoc Enterprises	Ford	160	155
6	35	10	Ricky Rudd	Rudd Performance Motorsports	Ford	160	155
7	17	2	Rusty Wallace	Penske Racing South	Ford	160	146
8	14	30	Johnny Benson Jr. #	Bahari Racing	Pontiac	160	152
9	8	1	Rick Mast	Precision Products Racing	Pontiac	160	138
10	7	94	Bill Elliott	Bill Elliott Racing	Ford	160	139
11	28	99	Jeff Burton	Roush Racing	Ford	160	130
12	20	23	Jimmy Spencer	Travis Carter Enterprises	Ford	160	127
13	3	9	Lake Speed	Melling Racing	Ford	160	129
14	36	12	Derrike Cope	Bobby Allison Motorsports	Ford	160	121
15	12	3	Dale Earnhardt*	Richard Childress Racing	Chevrolet	160	123
16	4	25	Ken Schrader	Hendrick Motorsports	Chevrolet	160	120
17	18	15	Wally Dallenbach Jr.	Bud Moore Engineering	Ford	160	112
18	16	8	Hut Stricklin	Stavola Brothers Racing	Ford	160	109
19	27	37	John Andretti	Kranefuss-Haas Racing	Ford	160	106
20	29	7	Geoff Bodine	Geoff Bodine Racing	Ford	160	103
21	21	16	Ted Musgrave	Roush Racing	Ford	160	100
22	22	11	Brett Bodine	Brett Bodine Racing	Ford	159	97
23	25	90	Dick Trickle	Donlavey Racing	Ford	159	94
24	23	18	Bobby Labonte	Joe Gibbs Racing	Chevrolet	159	91
25	19	98	Jeremy Mayfield	Cale Yarborough Motorsports	Ford	159	88
26	5†	77	Bobby Hillin Jr.	Jasper Motorsports	Ford	159	85
27	6	87	Joe Nemechek	NEMCO Motorsports	Chevrolet	159	82
28	30	21	Michael Waltrip	Wood Brothers Racing	Ford	159	79
29	26	95	Gary Bradberry	Sadler Brothers Racing	Ford	158	76
30	34	33	Robert Pressley	Leo Jackson Motorsports	Chevrolet	157	73
31	37	43	Bobby Hamilton	Petty Enterprises	Pontiac	156	70
32	10	29	Greg Sacks	Diamond Ridge Motorsports	Chevrolet	154	72
33	31	81	Kenny Wallace	FILMAR Racing	Ford	151	64
34	39	41	Ricky Craven	Larry Hedrick Motorsports	Chevrolet	142	61
35	40	71	Dave Marcis	Marcis Auto Racing	Chevrolet	112	58
36	32	22	Ward Burton	Bill Davis Racing	Pontiac	82	55
37	1	24	Jeff Gordon	Hendrick Motorsports	Chevrolet	40	57
38	13	42	Kyle Petty	Team SABCO	Pontiac	37	54
39	11	4	Sterling Marlin	Morgan-McClure Motorsports	Chevrolet	37	51
40	33	17	Darrell Waltrip	DarWal Inc.	Chevrolet	9	43
# Rookie of the Year candidate / *Mike Skinner took over Earnhardt's car after five laps / † Started at rear of field due to backup car Source:

=== Race statistics ===
- Time of race: 2:52:02
- Average speed: 139.508 miles per hour (224.516 km/h)
- Pole speed: 176.419 miles per hour (283.919 km/h)
- Cautions: 5 for 21 laps
- Margin of victory: under caution
- Lead changes: 18
- Percent of race run under caution: 13.1%
- Average green flag run: 27.8 laps

Lap leaders
Laps	Leader
1–3	Jeff Gordon
4–22	Mark Martin
23–24	Lake Speed
25	Dale Earnhardt
26–27	Ken Schrader
28	Sterling Marlin
29–30	Bill Elliott
31	Kyle Petty
32–72	Johnny Benson Jr.
73–82	Ernie Irvan
83–107	Johnny Benson Jr.
108–116	Ernie Irvan
117–120	Johnny Benson Jr.
121	Ricky Rudd
122–126	Ernie Irvan
127–134	Terry Labonte
135–138	Dale Jarrett
139–153	Ernie Irvan
154–160	Dale Jarrett

Total laps led
Laps	Leader
70	Johnny Benson Jr.
39	Ernie Irvan
19	Mark Martin
11	Dale Jarrett
8	Terry Labonte
3	Jeff Gordon
2	Bill Elliott
2	Lake Speed
2	Ken Schrader
1	Ricky Rudd
1	Dale Earnhardt
1	Kyle Petty
1	Sterling Marlin

Cautions: 5 for 21 laps
Laps	Reason
6–8	#29 (Greg Sacks), #33 (Robert Pressley), #41 (Ricky Craven), #71 (Dave Marcis), and #77 (Bobby Hillin Jr.) crash backstraight
24–27	#24 (Jeff Gordon) crash turn 4
39–47	#4 (Sterling Marlin) and #42 (Kyle Petty) crash turn 4
126–129	Debris frontstraight
160	#33 (Robert Pressley) crash turn 4

=== Standings after the race ===
Terry Labonte led the points standings after the race.

Pos	Driver	Points
1	Terry Labonte	2792
2	Dale Earnhardt	2731
3	Dale Jarrett	2729
4	Jeff Gordon	2688
5	Ricky Rudd	2415
6	Rusty Wallace	2393
7	Ernie Irvan	2363
8	Mark Martin	2357
9	Ken Schrader	2336
10	Sterling Marlin	2336

== Media ==
=== Television ===
The 1996 Brickyard 400 was carried live on television by ABC Sports. Paul Page, who was the announcer on ABC's Indianapolis 500 broadcasts, served as host for the final time. Bob Jenkins, 1973 Cup Series champion Benny Parsons and 1985 Indianapolis 500 winner Danny Sullivan called the race from the broadcast booth except Sullivan who was stationed in turn 2. Jerry Punch, Jack Arute and Gary Gerould handled pit road for the television side.

ABC/ESPN
Host	Booth announcers		Pit reporters
Host	Lap-by-lap	Color-commentators	Pit reporters
Paul Page	Bob Jenkins	Benny Parsons; Danny Sullivan	Jerry Punch; Jack Arute; Gary Gerould

Preceded by 1996 DieHard 500	NASCAR Winston Cup Series Season; 1996	Succeeded by 1996 The Bud at The Glen
