= Elton Sawyer =

American racing driver

- Born: Elton Everett Sawyer; November 5, 1959 (age 67); Chesapeake, Virginia, U.S.

NASCAR Cup Series career
- 29 races run over 2 years
- Best finish: 38th (1995)
- First race: 1995 Hanes 500 (Martinsville)
- Last race: 1996 NAPA 500 (Atlanta)
Wins	Top tens	Poles
0	0	0

NASCAR O'Reilly Auto Parts Series career
- 392 races run over 20 years
- Best finish: 5th (1998, 1999, 2001)
- First race: 1983 Cardinal 250 (Martinsville)
- Last race: 2002 Ford 300 (Homestead)
- First win: 1994 Cardinal Pride/Budweiser 250 (Myrtle Beach)
- Last win: 1999 Busch 200 (Loudon)
Wins	Top tens	Poles
2	131	2
- Statistics up to date as of November 2, 2013.

Elton Everett Sawyer (born November 5, 1959) is an American former NASCAR driver. He is married to former NASCAR driver Patty Moise, and is the older brother of Roger Sawyer, who has also competed in NASCAR. Sawyer is currently the senior Vice President of competition of NASCAR, having previously been the Vice President of Officiating and Technical Inspection.

== Early career ==
Sawyer began his career in the NASCAR Busch Series. He ran a handful of races in 1983, 1984, and 1985, scoring eight top-tens while running his own team. From 1986 to 1989, he ran full-time seasons with Lewis Motorsports. Sawyer ran competitively, scoring many top tens, while finishing between fourteenth and eighteenth in points in all of those years. Sawyer left the Lewis organization, after not winning in his four seasons with the team, and headed to the team owned by A. G. Dillard. In 1990, Sawyer ran his best career season, scoring four top-fives and finishing thirteenth in the points. However the following year, the Dillard team faced sponsorship problems, which kept Sawyer from completing the whole year. He salvaged a twentieth-place finish in the points that year. The sponsorship issues that affected Sawyer in 1991 also caused problems for him the next two years. He was not able to find a solid ride, and only competed in four races.

== Mid-1990s ==
However, luck changed for Sawyer in 1994 when he found a solid ride at Sutton Racing. He would go on to win his first Busch Series race at Myrtle Beach Speedway. He would only have six more top-tens the remaining of the year, finishing fourteenth in points. In 1995, Sawyer continued driving in the Busch Series full-time for Sutton, but he was named to replace Loy Allen Jr. in the No. 27 Winston Cup car Junior Johnson & Associates. Sawyer's Cup season did not fare too well, but his Busch year was his best of date, finishing ninth in points. In that same year, Sawyer competed in the Winston Select, driving the No. 27 car of Junior Johnson that made it in, thanks to Jimmy Spencer winning twice the previous year.

Sawyer started the 1996 Cup season driving for David Blair Motorsports. However, after sponsorship problems, he was released from the team. He then decided to jump back down to Busch, however he did not grab a solid ride until 1997, when he rejoined Sutton. Sawyer would go on to finish eighth in points. In 1998, he had a great year, finishing fifth in points, after scoring ten top-tens. In 1999, Sawyer joined Akins Motorsports in the Busch Series. Sawyer had one of his most competitive years, winning a race at New Hampshire International Speedway. He also scored fourteen top tens, and finished fifth in points. 2000 was also a great year for Sawyer after he scored once again fourteen top-tens and finished sixth in points.

== 2001–present ==
2001 turned out to be Sawyer's last full season in NASCAR. He raced competitively, scoring his career high of nineteen top-tens in a season, while finishing fifth in points. Akins had sold the No. 98 car to Michael Kranefuss in April 2001, however the team was unable to secure sponsorship after the season and folded, causing Sawyer to search for a ride for 2002. Sawyer did race three races in 2002 for the ailing Jeff Purvis at Brewco Motorsports. However, David Green received the ride in 2003. Sawyer continued looking for a ride; however, he was unable to find one due to the trend of teams wanting young drivers with sponsorship money.

On February 2, 2015, NASCAR announced that Sawyer would become the managing director of the Camping World Truck Series, replacing Chad Little, who was moved to a new role within the organization. Sawyer had previously served as the director of team operations for Action Express Racing in the TUDOR United SportsCar Championship.

In 2016, Sawyer was promoted to NASCAR Vice President, Technical Inspection and Officiating and oversaw race event management, transportation, and NASCAR official training and development. In January 2023, NASCAR announced that Elton Sawyer will serve as the sanctioning body’s Senior Vice President of Competition. In his new role, Sawyer will oversee all aspects of on-track competition.

== Motorsports career results ==
=== NASCAR ===
(key) (Bold – Pole position awarded by qualifying time. Italics – Pole position earned by points standings or practice time. * – Most laps led.)

==== Winston Cup Series ====
NASCAR Winston Cup Series results
Year	Team	No.	Make	1	2	3	4	5	6	7	8	9	10	11	12	13	14	15	16	17	18	19	20	21	22	23	24	25	26	27	28	29	30	31	NWCC	Pts	Ref
1985			Olds	DAY	RCH	CAR	ATL	BRI	DAR	NWS	MAR	TAL	DOV	CLT	RSD	POC	MCH	DAY	POC	TAL	MCH	BRI	DAR	RCH	DOV	MAR	NWS	CLT; DNQ	CAR	ATL	RSD				N/A	-	
1995	Junior Johnson & Associates	27	Ford	DAY	CAR	RCH	ATL	DAR	BRI	NWS	MAR; 20	TAL; 27	SON; DNQ	CLT; 25	DOV; 41	POC	MCH; 23	DAY	NHA; 23	POC; 29	TAL; 14	IND; 41	GLN; 29	MCH; 21	BRI; DNQ	DAR; 32	RCH; 38	DOV; 40	MAR; 33	NWS; 34	CLT; 28	CAR; 31	PHO; 30	ATL; 28	38th	1499	
1996	David Blair Motorsports	27	Ford	DAY; 25	CAR; DNQ	RCH; 30	ATL; 19	DAR; 30	BRI; 37	NWS; 32	MAR; DNQ	TAL; 37	SON	CLT; 21	DOV	POC	MCH	DAY	NHA	POC	TAL	IND	GLN	MCH; DNQ	BRI	DAR	RCH	DOV	MAR	NWS	CLT	CAR	PHO		43rd	705	
1996	Ranier-Walsh Racing	20	Ford																															ATL; 23	43rd	705	

===== Daytona 500 =====
Year	Team	Manufacturer	Start	Finish
1996	David Blair Motorsports	Ford	18	25

==== Busch Series ====
NASCAR Busch Series results
Year	Team	No.	Make	1	2	3	4	5	6	7	8	9	10	11	12	13	14	15	16	17	18	19	20	21	22	23	24	25	26	27	28	29	30	31	32	33	34	35	NBSC	Pts	Ref
1983	Zervakis Racing Team	01	Pontiac	DAY	RCH	CAR	HCY	MAR	NWS	SBO	GPS	LGY	DOV	BRI	CLT	SBO	HCY	ROU	SBO	ROU	CRW	ROU	SBO	HCY	LGY	IRP	GPS	BRI	HCY	DAR	RCH	NWS	SBO	MAR	ROU	CLT	HCY	MAR; 30	141st	73	
1984	Sawyer Racing	02	Pontiac	DAY	RCH; 7	CAR	HCY	MAR; 5	DAR	ROU	NSV																												38th	577	
1984	Sawyer Racing	0	Pontiac									LGY; 9	MLW	DOV	CLT	SBO	HCY	ROU	SBO	ROU	HCY	IRP	LGY	SBO	BRI	DAR													38th	577	
1984	Lewis Motorsports	42	Pontiac																								RCH; 9	NWS	CLT	HCY	CAR	MAR; 2							38th	577	
1985	Lewis Motorsports	42	Pontiac	DAY	CAR	HCY	BRI	MAR; 8	DAR	SBO	LGY; 4	DOV	CLT	SBO	HCY	ROU	IRP	SBO	LGY; 9	HCY	MLW	BRI	DAR	RCH; 27	NWS	ROU				MAR; 20									38th	577	
1985	Lewis Motorsports	42	Olds																								CLT; 23	HCY	CAR										38th	577	
1986	Lewis Motorsports	42	Olds	DAY	CAR; 29																																		15th	3046	
1986	Lewis Motorsports	42	Pontiac			HCY; 12	MAR; 8	BRI	DAR	SBO; 6	LGY; 3	JFC; 14			SBO; 8	HCY; 15	ROU	IRP; 21	SBO; 4	RAL; 20	OXF	SBO; 10	HCY; 8	LGY; 9	ROU; 7	BRI; 12		RCH; 6	DOV	MAR; 9	ROU; 11	CLT		MAR; 5					15th	3046	
1986	Lewis Motorsports	42	Chevy										DOV; 12	CLT; 12													DAR; 39						CAR; 27						15th	3046	
1987	Lewis Motorsports	42	Chevy	DAY; 14	HCY; 13	MAR; 27	DAR; 25	BRI; 25	LGY; 3	SBO; 24	CLT; 39	DOV; 11	IRP; 2	ROU; 11	JFC; 14	OXF; 32	SBO; 14	HCY; 20	RAL; 18	LGY; 3	ROU; 2	BRI; 4	JFC; 24	DAR; 24	RCH; 12	DOV; 28	MAR; 26	CLT; 43	CAR; 36	MAR; 8									14th	2955	
1988	Lewis Motorsports	42	Chevy	DAY; 28	HCY; 21	CAR; 38	MAR; 21	DAR; 23	BRI; 22	LNG; 6	NZH; 34	SBO; 15	NSV; 25	CLT; 36	DOV	ROU	LAN	LVL	MYB; 7	OXF; 35	SBO; 8	HCY; 12	LNG; 15	IRP; 16	ROU; 9	BRI; 15	DAR; 17	RCH; 29	DOV; 36	MAR; 3	CLT; 34	CAR; 15	MAR; 7						16th	2686	
1989	Lewis Motorsports	42	Chevy	DAY; 23	CAR; 15	MAR; 3	HCY	DAR; 32	BRI	NZH; 24	SBO			CLT; 32	DOV; 21	ROU; 6	LVL; 3	VOL; 23	MYB; 5	SBO; 12	HCY; 15	DUB; 24	IRP; 18	ROU; 17	BRI	DAR	RCH; 35	DOV	MAR; 30	CLT	CAR	MAR; 15							18th	2202	
1989	Huffman Racing	70	Olds									LAN; 11	NSV																										18th	2202	
1990	A.G. Dillard Motorsports	41	Buick	DAY; 5																																			13th	3442	
1990	Roy Hill Racing	4	Buick		RCH; 8																																		13th	3442	
1990	A.G. Dillard Motorsports	27	Buick			CAR; 19	MAR; 2	HCY; 10	DAR; 27	BRI; 30	LAN; 27	SBO; 10	NZH; 14	HCY; 23	CLT; 19	DOV; 9	ROU; 17	VOL; 2	MYB; 22	OXF; 29	NHA; 25	SBO; 24	DUB; 28	IRP; 6	ROU; 5	BRI; 31	DAR; 41	RCH; 12	DOV; 25	MAR; 18	CLT; 34	NHA; 6	CAR; 13	MAR; 15					13th	3442	
1991	A.G. Dillard Motorsports	27	Buick	DAY; 15	RCH; 26	CAR; 25	**MAR**; 5	VOL; 12	HCY; 12	DAR; 29	BRI; 27	LAN; 11	SBO; 7	NZH; 11	CLT; 38	DOV; 23	ROU; 23																						20th	2481	
1991	Henderson Motorsports	75	Olds															HCY; 24																					20th	2481	
1991	Laughlin Racing	45	Pontiac																MYB; 26	GLN	OXF	NHA																	20th	2481	
1991	Fred Harris	67	Pontiac																				SBO; 7	DUB; DNQ	IRP; 14	ROU; 27	BRI; 12	DAR; 23	RCH; 34	DOV; 21	CLT; DNQ	NHA	CAR	MAR; 30					20th	2481	
1992	Huffman Racing	77	Buick	DAY	CAR	RCH	ATL	MAR; 16	DAR	BRI	HCY	LAN	DUB	NZH	CLT	DOV	ROU	MYB																					81st	179	
1992	Owen Racing	91	Buick																GLN; 33	VOL	NHA	TAL	IRP	ROU	MCH	NHA	BRI	DAR	RCH	DOV	CLT	MAR	CAR	HCY					81st	179	
1993	Akins-Sutton Motorsports	38	Ford	DAY	CAR	RCH	DAR	BRI	HCY	ROU	MAR	NZH	CLT	DOV	MYB	GLN	MLW	TAL	IRP	MCH	NHA	BRI	DAR	RCH; 25	DOV	ROU	CLT; 36	MAR	CAR	HCY	ATL								80th	143	
1994	Akins-Sutton Motorsports	38	Ford	DAY; 20	CAR; 12	RCH; 4	ATL; DNQ	MAR; 22	DAR; 13	HCY; 28	BRI	ROU; 31	NHA; DNQ	NZH; 2	CLT; 21	DOV; 13	MYB; 1	GLN; 35	MLW; 8	SBO; 17	TAL; 21	HCY; 14	IRP; 22	MCH; 20	BRI; 15	DAR; 9	RCH; 31	DOV; 13	CLT; 5	MAR; 19	CAR; 39								14th	2873	
1994	Bobby Allison Motorsports	82	Ford				ATL; 38																																14th	2873	
1995	Akins-Sutton Motorsports	38	Ford	DAY; 39	CAR; 32	RCH; 15	ATL; 10	NSV; 30	DAR; 38	BRI; 18	HCY; 26	NHA; 2	NZH; 8	CLT; 27	DOV; 12	MYB; 10	GLN; 22	MLW; 14	TAL; 10	SBO; 7	**IRP**; 2	MCH; 13	BRI; 26	DAR; 8	RCH; 10	DOV; 17	CLT; 20	CAR; 14	HOM; 12										9th	2952	
1996	MS Racing	14	Ford	DAY	CAR	RCH	ATL; 33	NSV; 12	DAR	BRI	HCY; 17	NZH	CLT	DOV	SBO	MYB	GLN	MLW	NHA	TAL	IRP																		39th	1217	
1996	Akins-Sutton Motorsports	38	Ford																			MCH; 25	BRI; 12	DAR; 16	RCH; 22	DOV; 8	CLT; 19	CAR; 14	HOM; 15										39th	1217	
1997	Akins-Sutton Motorsports	38	Ford	DAY; 16	CAR; 12	RCH; 11	ATL; 2	LVS; 31	DAR; 17	HCY; 6	TEX; 11	BRI; 32	NSV; 17	TAL; 42	NHA; 4	NZH; 23	CLT; 43	DOV; 9	SBO; 5	GLN; 19	MLW; 6	MYB; 5	GTY; 4	IRP; 3	MCH; 16	BRI; 34	DAR; 13	RCH; 31	DOV; 16	CLT; 22	CAL; 19	CAR; 12	HOM; 32						8th	3419	
1998	Akins-Sutton Motorsports	38	Ford	DAY; 28	CAR; 14	LVS; 30	NSV; 10	DAR; 11	BRI; 4	TEX; 27	HCY; 27	TAL; 10	NHA; 27	NZH; 36	CLT; 8	DOV; 8	RCH; 18	PPR; 4	GLN; 11	MLW; 2	MYB; 11	CAL; 12	SBO; 25	IRP; 8	MCH; 8	BRI; 18	DAR; 12	RCH; 33	DOV; 3	CLT; 13	GTY; 38	CAR; 32	ATL; 13	HOM; 26					5th	3533	
1999	Akins-Sutton Motorsports	98	Ford	DAY; 21	CAR; 7	LVS; 26	ATL; 8	DAR; 2	TEX; 12	NSV; 8	BRI; 3	TAL; 41	CAL; 7	NHA; 1	RCH; 34	NZH; 32	CLT; 8	DOV; 9	SBO; 23	GLN; 11	MLW; 34	MYB; 7	PPR; 8	GTY; 13	IRP; 8	MCH; 26	BRI; 7	DAR; 14	RCH; 16	DOV; 26	CLT; 19	CAR; 14	MEM; 3	PHO; 15	HOM; 13				5th	3891	
2000	Akins Motorsports	98	Ford	DAY; 30	CAR; 12	LVS; 25	ATL; 18	DAR; 9	BRI; 12	TEX; 28	NSV; 13	TAL; 18	CAL; 9	RCH; 34	NHA; 9	CLT; 9	DOV; 9	SBO; 3	MYB; 3	GLN; 7	MLW; 6	NZH; 2	PPR; 25	GTY; 10	IRP; 6	MCH; 31	BRI; 29	DAR; 3	RCH; 19	DOV; 33	CLT; 29	CAR; 19	MEM; 2	PHO; 11	HOM; 40				6th	3776	
2001	Akins Motorsports	98	Ford	DAY; 43	CAR; 29	LVS; 8	ATL; 35	DAR; 9	BRI; 17	TEX; 21	NSH; 5	TAL; 6	CAL; 12	RCH; 40	NHA; 9	NZH; 11	CLT; 19	DOV; 6	KEN; 4	MLW; 6	GLN; 6	CHI; 8	GTY; 8	PPR; 30	IRP; 4	MCH; 7	BRI; 5	DAR; 2	RCH; 8	DOV; 11	KAN; 16	CLT; 9	MEM; 26	PHO; 38	CAR; 10	HOM; 2			5th	4100	
2002	Brewco Motorsports	37	Chevy	DAY	CAR	LVS	DAR	BRI	TEX	NSH	TAL	CAL	RCH	NHA	NZH	CLT	DOV	NSH	KEN	MLW	DAY	CHI	GTY	PPR	IRP	MCH	BRI	DAR	RCH	DOV	KAN	CLT	MEM	ATL	CAR; 22	PHO; 20	HOM; 22		70th	297	
