= Diamond Ridge Motorsports =

Former NASCAR team

- Owner(s): Gary Betchel (1990–1999); Michael Waltrip (2010)
- Base: Charlotte, North Carolina
- Series: NASCAR Cup Series, Busch Series
- Race drivers: Trevor Bayne, Steve Grissom, Bobby Hamilton, John Krebs, Travis Pastrana, Robert Pressley, Elliott Sadler, Hermie Sadler
- Manufacturer: Chevrolet (1990–1999); Toyota
- Opened: 1990
- Closed: 2012

Career
- Drivers' Championships: 0
- Race victories: 10

Diamond Ridge Motorsports (formerly Diamond-Waltrip Racing, and Pastrana-Waltrip Racing) was a NASCAR Nationwide Series team that competed in the NASCAR Cup Series and Busch Series from 1990 to 1999, and revived as a Nationwide Series team in 2010. The original Diamond Ridge team was owned and operated by Gary Bechtel. Despite modest success in the Busch Series, the team was never able to maintain a competitive level in the Winston Cup Series. The team was revived as a partnership with Michael Waltrip Racing in 2010 as Diamond-Waltrip Racing, running full-time in the Nationwide Series with Trevor Bayne. For 2011 the team partnered with action star Travis Pastrana and MWR development driver Ryan Truex, though the team shuttered temporarily due to Pastrana's injuries at the 2011 Summer X Games and a lacking sponsor. The team changed its name to Pastrana 199 Racing, a reference to Pastrana's standard number. The team was to field the No. 99 for Pastrana, but the deal was cancelled when Michael Waltrip Racing aligned with RAB Racing to field the No. 99.

== Winston Cup ==
Diamond Ridge Motorsports made its NASCAR debut at the 1990 Coca-Cola 600 as the No. 68 Country Time Pontiac Grand Prix. Bobby Hamilton qualified eighth for the race, but crashed early in the race and finished 39th. Phil Parsons also drove the No. 29 for Diamond Ridge at the Miller Genuine Draft 400, the DieHard 500, and the Heinz Southern 500, his best finish being 22nd. Dale Jarrett was supposed to drive but when Neil Bonnett got hurt Dale drove the Wood Brothers car and Diamond Ridge chose Phil Parsons instead.

After failing to run a race the following year, Diamond Ridge returned in 1992, with John Krebs driving Chevrolets at Sears Point and Phoenix, finishing 31st and 23rd, respectively. Krebs returned to run Sonoma and Pocono the next year as well, but DNF-d in both races. Andy Hillenburg drove one race for the team at Charlotte Motor Speedway, but had a DNF as well. Diamond Ridge ran one more race that year, at Phoenix, with Steve Grissom driving. He finished 29th.

In 1994, Diamond Ridge mounted its first full-time attempt at a Cup championship, hiring Grissom to drive for the team. Despite failing to qualify for the golden races of the Cup schedule (the Daytona 500 and the Brickyard 400), Grissom posted three top-tens and finished 28th in points, runner-up to Jeff Burton for Rookie of the Year. Krebs returned for a final race with Diamond Ridge, finishing 42nd in the No. 9 Channellock car. He crashed on lap 19 and flipped over in the dirt embankment. He did not suffer any injuries.

Grissom returned in 1995 and got off to a strong start, posting three top-tens in the first seven races of the season, but only finished one spot higher in the points standings. After that season, Meinke left, and Cartoon Network joined the team as Team Wacky Racing. Despite a fifth-place finish at Rockingham Speedway, Grissom was released from the ride after the spring Michigan race. Greg Sacks took over for the next six races, his best finish being a 29th at Pocono. Butch Leitzinger, Chad Little, Robert Pressley, and Jeff Green shared the driving duties in turns for the rest of the year.

In 1997, Diamond Ridge chose Pressley as its driver for the season. Pressley struggled and after the Winston 500, he was released from his ride. Jeff Green returned to take his place. After missing the first ten races of the year, Green had two top-tens and finished 39th in the points. Unfortunately, at the end of the year, Cartoon Network announced it would not return as sponsor. The team attempted a few races with Green as Team Monte Carlo sponsoring, but they only qualified for three races, and Green left the organization. The team ran the No. 92 later in the season for Elliott Sadler in two races. After the year came to a close Diamond Ridge announced it was suspending the operations for its Cup team, and would return to the Busch Series for a planned return to Cup in 2001.

In 2009, Bechtel became a co-owner of Tommy Baldwin Racing, but left the team after several months.

=== Car No. 29 results ===
Year	Driver	No.	Make	1	2	3	4	5	6	7	8	9	10	11	12	13	14	15	16	17	18	19	20	21	22	23	24	25	26	27	28	29	30	31	32	33	NWCC	Pts
1990	Bobby Hamilton	68	Pontiac	DAY	RCH	CAR	ATL	DAR	BRI	NWS	MAR	TAL	CLT; 39	DOV	SON	POC																						
1990	Phil Parsons	29	Pontiac														MCH; 22	DAY	POC	TAL; 41	GLN	MCH	BRI	DAR; 19	RCH	DOV	MAR	NWS	CLT	CAR	PHO	ATL						
1992	John Krebs	99	Pontiac	DAY	CAR	RCH	ATL	DAR	BRI	NWS	MAR	TAL	CLT	DOV	SON; 31	POC	MCH	DAY	POC	TAL	GLN	MCH	BRI	DAR	RCH	DOV	MAR	NWS	CLT	CAR								
1992	John Krebs	29	Chevy																												PHO; 23	ATL						
1993	John Krebs	29	Chevy	DAY	CAR	RCH	ATL	DAR	BRI	NWS	MAR	TAL	SON; 34	CLT	DOV	POC	MCH	DAY	NHA				MCH; DNQ	BRI	DAR	RCH	DOV	MAR	NWS									
1993	John Krebs	99	Chevy																	POC; 35	TAL	GLN																
1993	Andy Hillenburg	29	Chevy																											CLT; 41	CAR							
1993	Steve Grissom	29	Chevy																													PHO; 29	ATL					
1994	Steve Grissom	29	Chevy	DAY; DNQ	CAR; 30	RCH; 23	ATL; 20	DAR; 14	BRI; 12	NWS; DNQ	MAR; 14	TAL; 10	SON; 35	CLT; 39	DOV; 27	POC; 26	MCH; 26	DAY; 33	NHA; 33	POC; 29	TAL; 18	IND; DNQ	GLN; 23	MCH; 19	BRI; 34	DAR; 23	RCH; 7	DOV; 8	MAR; 12	NWS; 20	CLT; 26	CAR; 30	PHO; 22	ATL; 26			29th	2660
1995	Steve Grissom	29	Chevy	DAY; 7	CAR; 6	RCH; DNQ	ATL; 18	DAR; 6	BRI; 11	NWS; 5	MAR; 20	TAL; 37	SON; 26	CLT; 13	DOV; 16	POC; 18	MCH; 20	DAY; 43	NHA; 28	POC; 31	TAL; 25	IND; 30	GLN; 22	MCH; 29	BRI; 22	DAR; 27	RCH; DNQ	DOV; 25	MAR; 26	NWS; 31	CLT; 41	CAR; 14	PHO; 32	ATL; 39				
1996	Steve Grissom	29	Chevy	DAY; 27	CAR; 5	RCH; 21	ATL; 39	DAR; 26	BRI; 27	NWS; 26	MAR; DNQ	TAL; 6	SON; 25	CLT; 16	DOV; 42	POC; 22	MCH; 34																				35th	2322
1996	Greg Sacks	29	Chevy															DAY; 39	NHA; 30	POC; 29	TAL; 25	IND; 32		MCH; 30													35th	2322
1996	Butch Leitzinger	29	Chevy																				GLN; 20														35th	2322
1996	Chad Little	29	Chevy																						BRI; 23	DAR; 20	RCH; 40	DOV; 41	MAR; DNQ								35th	2322
1996	Jeff Green	29	Chevy																											NWS; 32	CLT; 26						35th	2322
1996	Robert Pressley	29	Chevy																													CAR; 37	PHO; 36	ATL; 33			35th	2322
1997	Robert Pressley	29	Chevy	DAY; 39	CAR; 37	RCH; 21	ATL; DNQ	DAR; 39	TEX; DNQ	BRI; 14	MAR; 23	SON; DNQ	TAL; 29																								37th	2297
1997	Jeff Green	29	Chevy											CLT; 22	DOV; 37	POC; 35	MCH; 31	CAL; 7	DAY; DNQ	NHA; 32	POC; 31	IND; 25	GLN; 30	MCH; 18	BRI; 21	DAR; 39	RCH; 31	NHA; 38	DOV; 40	MAR; 30	CLT; 29	TAL; DNQ	CAR; 21	PHO; 32	ATL; 4		37th	2297
1998	Jeff Green	29	Chevy	DAY; DNQ	CAR; 22	LVS; 33	ATL; DNQ	DAR; 32	BRI; DNQ	TEX	MAR	TAL; DNQ	CAL																								48th	322
1998	Elliott Sadler	92	Chevy											CLT; 42	DOV	RCH	MCH	POC	SON	NHA	POC	IND	GLN	MCH	BRI; 24	NHA	DAR	RCH	DOV	MAR	CLT	TAL	DAY	PHO	CAR	ATL	48th	322

=== Car No. 9 results ===
Year	Driver	No.	Make	1	2	3	4	5	6	7	8	9	10	11	12	13	14	15	16	17	18	19	20	21	22	23	24	25	26	27	28	29	30	31	NWCC	Pts
1994	John Krebs	9	Chevy	DAY	CAR	RCH	ATL	DAR	BRI	NWS	MAR	TAL	SON; 42	CLT	DOV	POC	MCH	DAY	NHA	POC	TAL	IND	GLN	MCH	BRI	DAR	RCH	DOV	MAR	NWS	CLT	CAR	PHO	ATL		

== Busch Series / Nationwide return ==
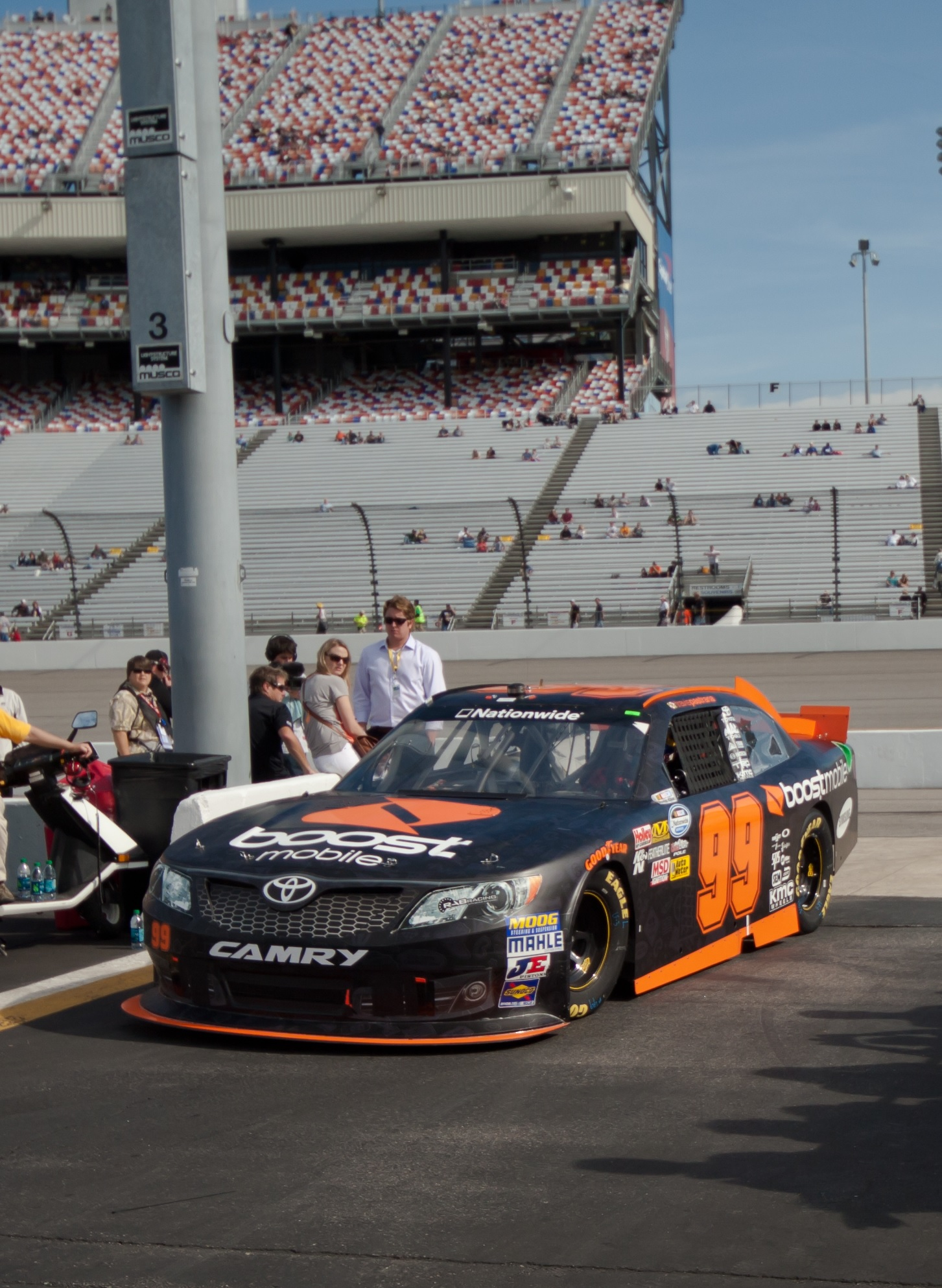
Travis Pastrana in the No. 99 at Richmond International Raceway in 2012

Diamond Ridge's Busch program began running with Grissom in 1994, when they purchased Grissom's Busch operation during the 1994 Busch Series season and release Tom Peck. Channellock and Meineke were sponsors and Grissom won twice during his abbreviated season. He ran eight races in 1996 with WCW sponsoring and had another visit to victory lane, but he was released during the season. Bill Ingle, the team's crew chief, took over driving duties at South Boston Speedway and Loudon, finishing 22nd and 26th respectively. Greg Sacks signed a one race deal to drive at Talladega Superspeedway, and ended up winning the race. Soon afterwards, Bechtel signed driver Elliott Sadler and ran the rest of the year, and had three top-ten finishes.

Geared up for a full run in 1997, Diamond Ridge & Sadler went from unsponsored to receiving backing from Phillips 66. The extra funding made a difference as Sadler captured his first career victory at Nazareth Speedway. He went on to post additional victories at Myrtle Beach and Gateway. He finished fifth in points that year. Diamond Ridge also expanded to a three car operation in 1997, purchasing the No. 1 DeWalt Tools team and fielding a car for Sadler's older brother, Hermie. Hermie had two poles and finished tenth in points in 1997. Diamond Ridge also fielded the No. 8 for Jeff Green, who won at Las Vegas Motor Speedway and ran fourteen races before he moved to Cup. In 1998, Elliott's team switched to No. 66 in order to accommodate their sponsor while Hermie moved into the No. 29. Hermie had a season virtually identical to 1997, posting two top-fives and having another tenth-place finish in the championship. Elliott scored three victories and finished eighth in points. Unfortunately, Elliott, who Diamond Ridge hoped would be their future in Cup, signed with Wood Brothers Racing. Still, hope was not lost. In 1999, Bechtel merged his Busch program with Joe Gibbs Racing, to field the No. 4 Lance Snacks Chevy for Jeff Purvis. While Purvis did not win that year, he had twelve top-ten finishes. The team fielded the No. 29 briefly as a second car for Curtis Markham, but sponsorship problems kept that from turning into a full-time ride. During the season, Bechtel eventually lost interest in the team, and sold the whole of the operation to Gibbs. Diamond Ridge Motorsports never returned to Cup as planned. The number 29 later went to Kevin Harvick in his first season in the Cup Series replacing Dale Earnhardt.

In November 2009, Bechtel returned as partner of Michael Waltrip Racing to form Diamond-Waltrip Racing. The team fielded Trevor Bayne for most of the year with sponsorship from Out! Pet Care and Aaron's. Bayne scored three consecutive poles in the summer, but he moved to Roush Fenway Racing at Kansas when Gary Bechtel was unable to come up with a sponsor for 2011. The Truex brothers Martin and Ryan drove the No. 99 and No. 00 Toyotas for the remainder of the season.

It was announced late in 2010 that the team has formed a partnership with Rally driver and motocross star Travis Pastrana for him to race in the Nationwide Series in 2011 and 2012. Pastrana was to run 7 races in 2011 under the banner of Pastrana-Waltrip Racing with sponsorship from Boost Mobile. Pastrana was to debut at Lucas Oil Raceway at Indianapolis to promote the 2011 X Games and Pastranathon, but was injured while performing the 'Toilet Paper Roll' at the Staples Center in L.A. on July 28, 2011. He sustained a broken right foot and ankle, which required surgery and forced PWR's withdrawal from competition for the rest of the season. As a result, Ryan moved to Joe Gibbs Racing for the rest of 2011. For 2012, the team changed its name to Pastrana 199 Racing to prevent a conflict with Clint Bowyer's sponsorship from 5-hour Energy due to Pastrana's status as a Red Bull athlete. However, MWR struck a partnership with RAB Racing to run the 99 car.

== Driver history ==
=== Winston Cup ===
- Bobby Hamilton (1990)
- Phil Parsons (1990)
- John Krebs (1992–1994)
- Andy Hillenburg (1993)
- Steve Grissom (1993–1996)
- Greg Sacks (1996)
- Butch Leitzinger (1996)
- Chad Little (1996)
- Jeff Green (1996–1998)
- Robert Pressley (1996–1997)
- Elliott Sadler (1998)
