= David Blair Motorsports =

Former NASCAR Winston Cup team

Blair Motorsports
- Owner: David Blair
- Base: Statesville, North Carolina
- Series: Winston Cup
- Race drivers: Kenny Irwin Jr. Elton Sawyer Todd Bodine Rick Wilson
- Manufacturer: Ford
- Opened: 1996
- Closed: 1998

Career
- Drivers' Championships: 0
- Race victories: 0

David Blair Motorsports (DBM) is a former NASCAR Winston Cup team. It was formed in 1995 by attorney David Blair. It only ran a few years in the circuit, and never could hang onto a regular sponsor.

== 1996 ==
David Blair Motorsports began racing in 1996, the No. 27 team having been acquired in its entirety from Junior Johnson & Associates. It was able to keep the number, 27, and the driver, Elton Sawyer. Sawyer and the team got off to a disappointing start, failing to qualify for two races and only mustering up a best finish of 19th at the spring Atlanta race. After the Coca-Cola 600, Sawyer was released due to a lack of funding for the operation, and the team suspended operations to reorganize. After a failed attempt at the Brickyard 400 with Jason Keller driving, DBM reappeared at the Mountain Dew Southern 500 with Todd Bodine driving. Bodine qualified sixteenth and finished 15th. Bodine ran two more races with the team that season, never qualifying outside the top 20.

== 1997 ==
After starting 1997 off with no driver or sponsor, the team finally hooked up a deal with Rick Wilson to run selected events that season. The team returned at the Miller 400 at Michigan, where Wilson started 31st and finished 21st. He had the same finish later in the year at the Brickyard 400 in a car sponsored by the Indianapolis Colts.

In September that year, Blair was hired by Robert Yates Racing to field a car for their new driver, Kenny Irwin Jr., to prepare him for his rookie year in 1998. In his first start with the team at Richmond International Raceway, Irwin qualified on the outside pole. He followed that up with taking the lead at lap 86 and holding it for the next 12 laps before finishing in eighth place. In his next start, at Martinsville Speedway, he qualified third but had to make an early exit due to a fuel pump problem. He ran two more races that year before moving to RYR full-time for 1998.

== 1998 ==
DBM began 1998 in a familiar place: no sponsor. Despite signing Tommy Kendall to drive early on, the team was unable to locate a sponsor for the year, and Kendall left the team. This did not stop the team from looking towards the future, as they built a full shop of Ford Tauruses to prepare for a full-time run. A successful test at Darlington Speedway with Mike Wallace yielded optimism for 1999, but by November, it was obvious the situation hadn't gotten any better. As a result, Blair laid off all of his employees and sold the shop and equipment to Travis Carter Motorsports. Under the TCM banner, the old David Blair team ran for five years with mediocre results, before disappearing in 2003.

=== Car No. 27 results ===
Year	Driver	No.	Make	1	2	3	4	5	6	7	8	9	10	11	12	13	14	15	16	17	18	19	20	21	22	23	24	25	26	27	28	29	30	31	32	NWCC	Pts
1996	Elton Sawyer	27	Ford	DAY; 25	CAR; DNQ	RCH; 30	ATL; 19	DAR; 30	BRI; 37	NWS; 32	MAR; DNQ	TAL; 37	SON	CLT; 21	DOV	POC	MCH	DAY	NHA	POC	TAL			MCH; DNQ	BRI											38th	892
1996	Jason Keller	27	Ford																			IND; DNQ	GLN													38th	892
1996	Todd Bodine	27	Ford																							DAR; 15	RCH; 34	DOV	MAR	NWS	CLT; 21	CAR	PHO			38th	892
1996	Ron Barfield Jr.	27	Ford																															ATL; DNQ		38th	892
1997	Rick Wilson	27	Ford	DAY	CAR	RCH	ATL	DAR	TEX; DNQ	BRI	MAR	SON	TAL	CLT	DOV	POC	MCH; 21	CAL	DAY	NHA	POC	IND; 21	GLN	MCH	BRI	DAR					CLT; 19	TAL				46th	731
1997	Kenny Irwin Jr.	27	Ford																								RCH; 8	NHA	DOV	MAR; 37			CAR; DNQ	PHO; 20	ATL; 25	46th	731
