= 1996 Goody's Headache Powder 500 (Bristol) =

22nd race of the 1996 NASCAR Winston Cup Series

Race details
- Race 22 of 31 in the 1996 NASCAR Winston Cup Series
- The 1996 Goody's Headache Powder 500 program cover, featuring Dale Earnhardt and Terry Labonte.
- Date: August 24, 1996
- Official name: 36th Annual Goody's Headache Powder 500
- Location: Bristol, Tennessee, Bristol Motor Speedway
- Course: Permanent racing facility
- Course length: 0.533 miles (0.858 km)
- Distance: 500 laps, 266.5 mi (428.89 km)
- Average speed: 91.267 miles per hour (146.880 km/h)

Pole position
Driver	Mark Martin	Roush Racing
- Time: 15.368

Most laps led
Driver	Rusty Wallace	Penske Racing South
- Laps: 353

Winner
No. 2	Rusty Wallace	Penske Racing South

Television in the United States
- Network: ESPN
- Announcers: Bob Jenkins, Ned Jarrett, Benny Parsons

Radio in the United States
- Radio: Performance Racing Network

The 1996 Goody's Headache Powder 500 was the 22nd stock car race of the 1996 NASCAR Winston Cup Series and the 36th iteration of the event. The race was held on Saturday, August 24, 1996, in Bristol, Tennessee at Bristol Motor Speedway, a 0.533 miles (0.858 km) permanent oval-shaped racetrack. The race took the scheduled 500 laps to complete. At race's end, Penske Racing South driver Rusty Wallace would manage to dominate a majority of the race to take his 46th career NASCAR Winston Cup Series victory and his fifth and final victory of the season. To fill out the top three, Hendrick Motorsports driver Jeff Gordon and Roush Racing driver Mark Martin would finish second and third, respectively.

== Background ==
The layout of Bristol Motor Speedway, the venue where the race was held.

The Bristol Motor Speedway, formerly known as Bristol International Raceway and Bristol Raceway, is a NASCAR short track venue located in Bristol, Tennessee. Constructed in 1960, it held its first NASCAR race on July 30, 1961. Despite its short length, Bristol is among the most popular tracks on the NASCAR schedule because of its distinct features, which include extraordinarily steep banking, an all concrete surface, two pit roads, and stadium-like seating. It has also been named one of the loudest NASCAR tracks.

=== Entry list ===
- (R) denotes rookie driver.

#	Driver	Team	Make
1	Rick Mast	Precision Products Racing	Pontiac
2	Rusty Wallace	Penske Racing South	Ford
3	Dale Earnhardt	Richard Childress Racing	Chevrolet
4	Sterling Marlin	Morgan–McClure Motorsports	Chevrolet
5	Terry Labonte	Hendrick Motorsports	Chevrolet
6	Mark Martin	Roush Racing	Ford
7	Geoff Bodine	Geoff Bodine Racing	Ford
8	Hut Stricklin	Stavola Brothers Racing	Ford
9	Lake Speed	Melling Racing	Ford
10	Ricky Rudd	Rudd Performance Motorsports	Ford
11	Brett Bodine	Brett Bodine Racing	Ford
12	Derrike Cope	Bobby Allison Motorsports	Ford
15	Wally Dallenbach Jr.	Bud Moore Engineering	Ford
16	Ted Musgrave	Roush Racing	Ford
17	Darrell Waltrip	Darrell Waltrip Motorsports	Chevrolet
18	Bobby Labonte	Joe Gibbs Racing	Chevrolet
21	Michael Waltrip	Wood Brothers Racing	Ford
22	Ward Burton	Bill Davis Racing	Pontiac
23	Jimmy Spencer	Haas-Carter Motorsports	Ford
24	Jeff Gordon	Hendrick Motorsports	Chevrolet
25	Ken Schrader	Hendrick Motorsports	Chevrolet
28	Ernie Irvan	Robert Yates Racing	Ford
29	Chad Little	Diamond Ridge Motorsports	Chevrolet
30	Johnny Benson Jr. (R)	Bahari Racing	Pontiac
33	Robert Pressley	Leo Jackson Motorsports	Chevrolet
37	Jeremy Mayfield	Kranefuss-Haas Racing	Ford
41	Ricky Craven	Larry Hedrick Motorsports	Chevrolet
42	Jim Sauter	Team SABCO	Pontiac
43	Bobby Hamilton	Petty Enterprises	Pontiac
71	Dave Marcis	Marcis Auto Racing	Chevrolet
75	Morgan Shepherd	Butch Mock Motorsports	Ford
77	Bobby Hillin Jr.	Jasper Motorsports	Ford
81	Kenny Wallace	FILMAR Racing	Ford
87	Joe Nemechek	NEMCO Motorsports	Chevrolet
88	Dale Jarrett	Robert Yates Racing	Ford
90	Dick Trickle	Donlavey Racing	Ford
94	Bill Elliott*	Bill Elliott Racing	Ford
95	Gary Bradberry	Sadler Brothers Racing	Ford
98	Jeremy Mayfield	Cale Yarborough Motorsports	Ford
99	Jeff Burton	Roush Racing	Ford

*Replaced by Bobby Hillin Jr. for the race due to complications from injuries suffered at the 1996 Winston Select 500.

== Qualifying ==
Qualifying was split into two rounds. The first round was held on Friday, August 23, at 5:30 PM EST. Each driver would have one lap to set a time. During the first round, the top 25 drivers in the round would be guaranteed a starting spot in the race. If a driver was not able to guarantee a spot in the first round, they had the option to scrub their time from the first round and try and run a faster lap time in a second round qualifying run, held on Saturday, August 34, at 12:30 PM EST. As with the first round, each driver would have one lap to set a time. For this specific race, positions 26-34 would be decided on time, and depending on who needed it, a select amount of positions were given to cars who had not otherwise qualified but were high enough in owner's points.

Mark Martin, driving for Roush Racing, would win the pole, setting a time of 15.368 and an average speed of 124.857 miles per hour (200.938 km/h).

Bobby Hillin Jr. was the only driver to fail to qualify.

=== Full qualifying results ===
Pos.	#	Driver	Team	Make	Time	Speed
1	6	Mark Martin	Roush Racing	Ford	15.368	124.857
2	24	Jeff Gordon	Hendrick Motorsports	Chevrolet	15.401	124.589
3	5	Terry Labonte	Hendrick Motorsports	Chevrolet	15.455	124.154
4	41	Ricky Craven	Larry Hedrick Motorsports	Chevrolet	15.464	124.082
5	2	Rusty Wallace	Penske Racing South	Ford	15.468	124.050
6	21	Michael Waltrip	Wood Brothers Racing	Ford	15.514	123.682
7	81	Kenny Wallace	FILMAR Racing	Ford	15.542	123.459
8	28	Ernie Irvan	Robert Yates Racing	Ford	15.545	123.435
9	88	Dale Jarrett	Robert Yates Racing	Ford	15.548	123.411
10	25	Ken Schrader	Hendrick Motorsports	Chevrolet	15.560	123.316
11	4	Sterling Marlin	Morgan–McClure Motorsports	Chevrolet	15.560	123.316
12	7	Geoff Bodine	Geoff Bodine Racing	Ford	15.564	123.285
13	10	Ricky Rudd	Rudd Performance Motorsports	Ford	15.588	123.095
14	87	Joe Nemechek	NEMCO Motorsports	Chevrolet	15.595	123.039
15	23	Jimmy Spencer	Travis Carter Enterprises	Ford	15.613	122.898
16	75	Morgan Shepherd	Butch Mock Motorsports	Ford	15.617	122.866
17	8	Hut Stricklin	Stavola Brothers Racing	Ford	15.623	122.819
18	99	Jeff Burton	Roush Racing	Ford	15.635	122.725
19	11	Brett Bodine	Brett Bodine Racing	Ford	15.650	122.607
20	17	Darrell Waltrip	Darrell Waltrip Motorsports	Chevrolet	15.651	122.599
21	22	Ward Burton	Bill Davis Racing	Pontiac	15.659	122.537
22	18	Bobby Labonte	Joe Gibbs Racing	Chevrolet	15.660	122.529
23	3	Dale Earnhardt	Richard Childress Racing	Chevrolet	15.675	122.411
24	71	Dave Marcis	Marcis Auto Racing	Chevrolet	15.679	122.380
25	90	Dick Trickle	Donlavey Racing	Ford	15.685	122.333
26	9	Lake Speed	Melling Racing	Ford	15.692	122.279
27	95	Gary Bradberry	Sadler Brothers Racing	Ford	15.692	122.279
28	16	Ted Musgrave	Roush Racing	Ford	15.696	122.248
29	30	Johnny Benson Jr. (R)	Bahari Racing	Pontiac	15.698	122.232
30	1	Rick Mast	Precision Products Racing	Pontiac	15.701	122.209
31	33	Robert Pressley	Leo Jackson Motorsports	Chevrolet	15.726	122.014
32	15	Wally Dallenbach Jr.	Bud Moore Engineering	Ford	15.744	121.875
33	42	Jim Sauter	Team SABCO	Pontiac	15.761	121.744
34	37	John Andretti	Kranefuss-Haas Racing	Ford	15.773	121.651
Provisionals
35	43	Bobby Hamilton	Petty Enterprises	Pontiac	-*	-*
36	98	Jeremy Mayfield	Cale Yarborough Motorsports	Ford	-*	-*
37	12	Derrike Cope	Bobby Allison Motorsports	Ford	-*	-*
38	29	Chad Little	Diamond Ridge Motorsports	Chevrolet	-*	-*
Champion's Provisional
39	94	Bill Elliott	Bill Elliott Racing	Ford	-*	-*
Failed to qualify
40	77	Bobby Hillin Jr.	Jasper Motorsports	Ford	-*	-*
Official first round qualifying results
Official starting lineup

== Race results ==
Fin	St	#	Driver	Team	Make	Laps	Led	Status	Pts	Winnings
1	5	2	Rusty Wallace	Penske Racing South	Ford	500	353	running	185	$77,090
2	2	24	Jeff Gordon	Hendrick Motorsports	Chevrolet	500	99	running	175	$54,590
3	1	6	Mark Martin	Roush Racing	Ford	500	9	running	170	$46,490
4	9	88	Dale Jarrett	Robert Yates Racing	Ford	500	18	running	165	$32,980
5	3	5	Terry Labonte	Hendrick Motorsports	Chevrolet	500	0	running	155	$37,875
6	6	21	Michael Waltrip	Wood Brothers Racing	Ford	500	0	running	150	$30,865
7	15	23	Jimmy Spencer	Travis Carter Enterprises	Ford	500	21	running	151	$39,240
8	21	22	Ward Burton	Bill Davis Racing	Pontiac	500	0	running	142	$32,440
9	13	10	Ricky Rudd	Rudd Performance Motorsports	Ford	500	0	running	138	$32,115
10	35	43	Bobby Hamilton	Petty Enterprises	Pontiac	500	0	running	134	$35,265
11	20	17	Darrell Waltrip	Darrell Waltrip Motorsports	Chevrolet	499	0	running	130	$28,015
12	28	16	Ted Musgrave	Roush Racing	Ford	498	0	running	127	$27,715
13	10	25	Ken Schrader	Hendrick Motorsports	Chevrolet	498	0	running	124	$27,565
14	19	11	Brett Bodine	Brett Bodine Racing	Ford	498	0	running	121	$27,215
15	7	81	Kenny Wallace	FILMAR Racing	Ford	497	0	running	118	$21,060
16	26	9	Lake Speed	Melling Racing	Ford	497	0	running	115	$26,560
17	36	98	Jeremy Mayfield	Cale Yarborough Motorsports	Ford	496	0	running	112	$19,410
18	11	4	Sterling Marlin	Morgan–McClure Motorsports	Chevrolet	496	0	running	109	$32,260
19	16	75	Morgan Shepherd	Butch Mock Motorsports	Ford	495	0	running	106	$19,250
20	17	8	Hut Stricklin	Stavola Brothers Racing	Ford	492	0	running	103	$20,910
21	4	41	Ricky Craven	Larry Hedrick Motorsports	Chevrolet	492	0	running	100	$25,885
22	39	94	Bobby Hillin Jr.	Bill Elliott Racing	Ford	491	0	running	97	$25,735
23	38	29	Chad Little	Diamond Ridge Motorsports	Chevrolet	486	0	running	94	$25,585
24	23	3	Dale Earnhardt	Richard Childress Racing	Chevrolet	476	0	running	91	$32,310
25	32	15	Wally Dallenbach Jr.	Bud Moore Engineering	Ford	473	0	running	88	$25,565
26	25	90	Dick Trickle	Donlavey Racing	Ford	470	0	running	85	$18,210
27	24	71	Dave Marcis	Marcis Auto Racing	Chevrolet	470	0	running	82	$18,187
28	29	30	Johnny Benson Jr. (R)	Bahari Racing	Pontiac	465	0	running	79	$24,635
29	37	12	Derrike Cope	Bobby Allison Motorsports	Ford	458	0	running	76	$22,110
30	27	95	Gary Bradberry	Sadler Brothers Racing	Ford	449	0	running	73	$15,060
31	33	42	Jim Sauter	Team SABCO	Pontiac	433	0	crash	70	$22,060
32	22	18	Bobby Labonte	Joe Gibbs Racing	Chevrolet	408	0	crash	67	$32,060
33	31	33	Robert Pressley	Leo Jackson Motorsports	Chevrolet	396	0	running	64	$22,060
34	14	87	Joe Nemechek	NEMCO Motorsports	Chevrolet	385	0	running	61	$22,060
35	30	1	Rick Mast	Precision Products Racing	Pontiac	374	0	crash	58	$22,060
36	8	28	Ernie Irvan	Robert Yates Racing	Ford	370	0	running	55	$30,060
37	18	99	Jeff Burton	Roush Racing	Ford	348	0	running	52	$15,060
38	34	37	John Andretti	Kranefuss-Haas Racing	Ford	340	0	crash	49	$22,060
39	12	7	Geoff Bodine	Geoff Bodine Racing	Ford	206	0	oil leak	46	$30,060
Official race results

Previous race: 1996 GM Goodwrench Dealer 400	NASCAR Winston Cup Series; 1996 season	Next race: 1996 Mountain Dew Southern 500
