= 1996 NASCAR Winston Cup Series =

American motorsport season

Seasons
- ← 1995 1997 →

The 1996 NASCAR Winston Cup Series was the 48th season of professional stock car racing in the United States and the 25th modern-era NASCAR Cup series. The season had been started on February 18 at Daytona International Speedway, and ended on November 10 at Atlanta Motor Speedway. The season would be remembered for Terry Labonte pulling off a massive upset and winning his second Winston Cup Championship over teammate Jeff Gordon.

The 1996 Winston Cup Champion Terry Labonte

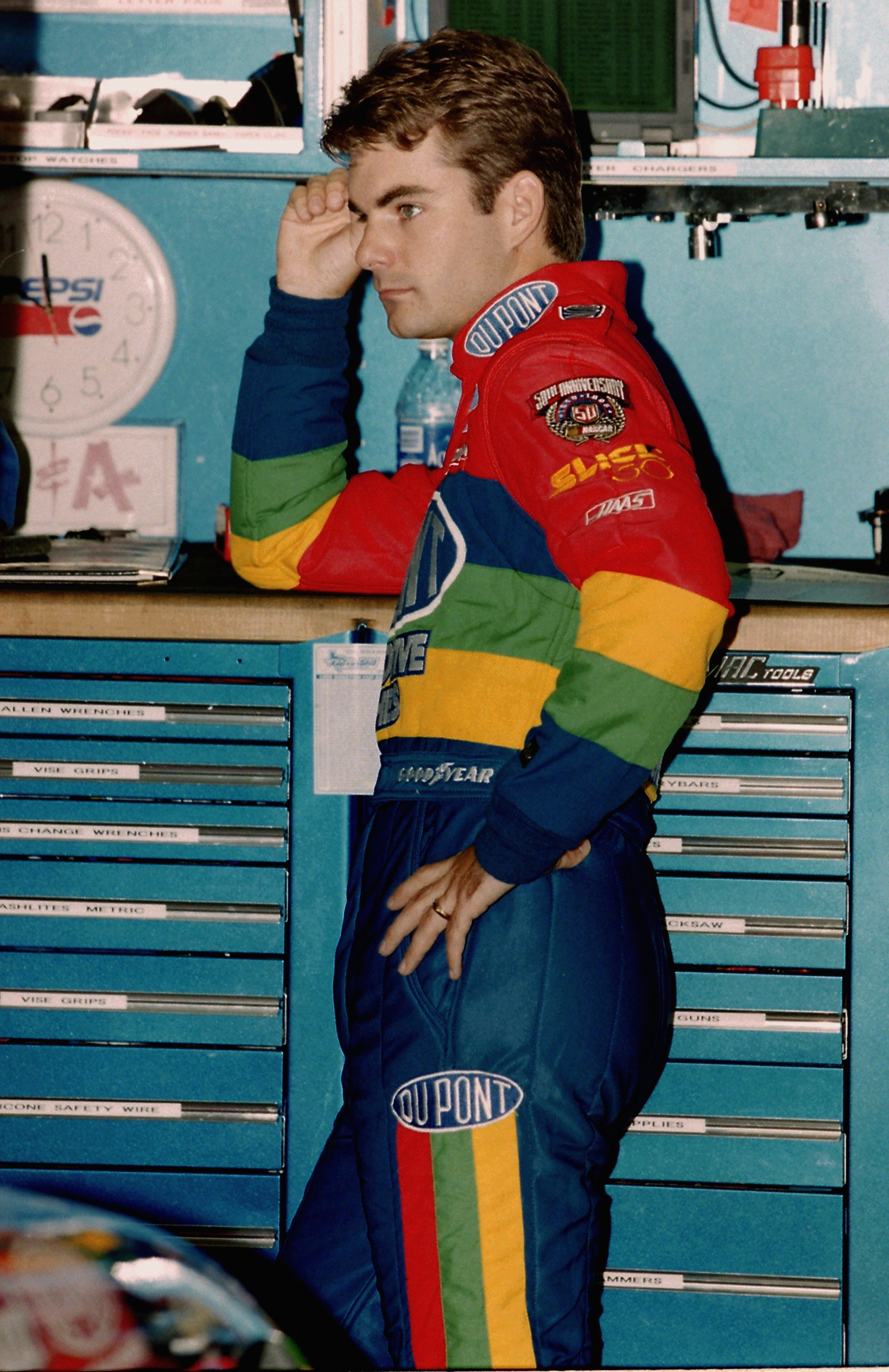
Labonte's teammate Jeff Gordon finished second by 37 points.

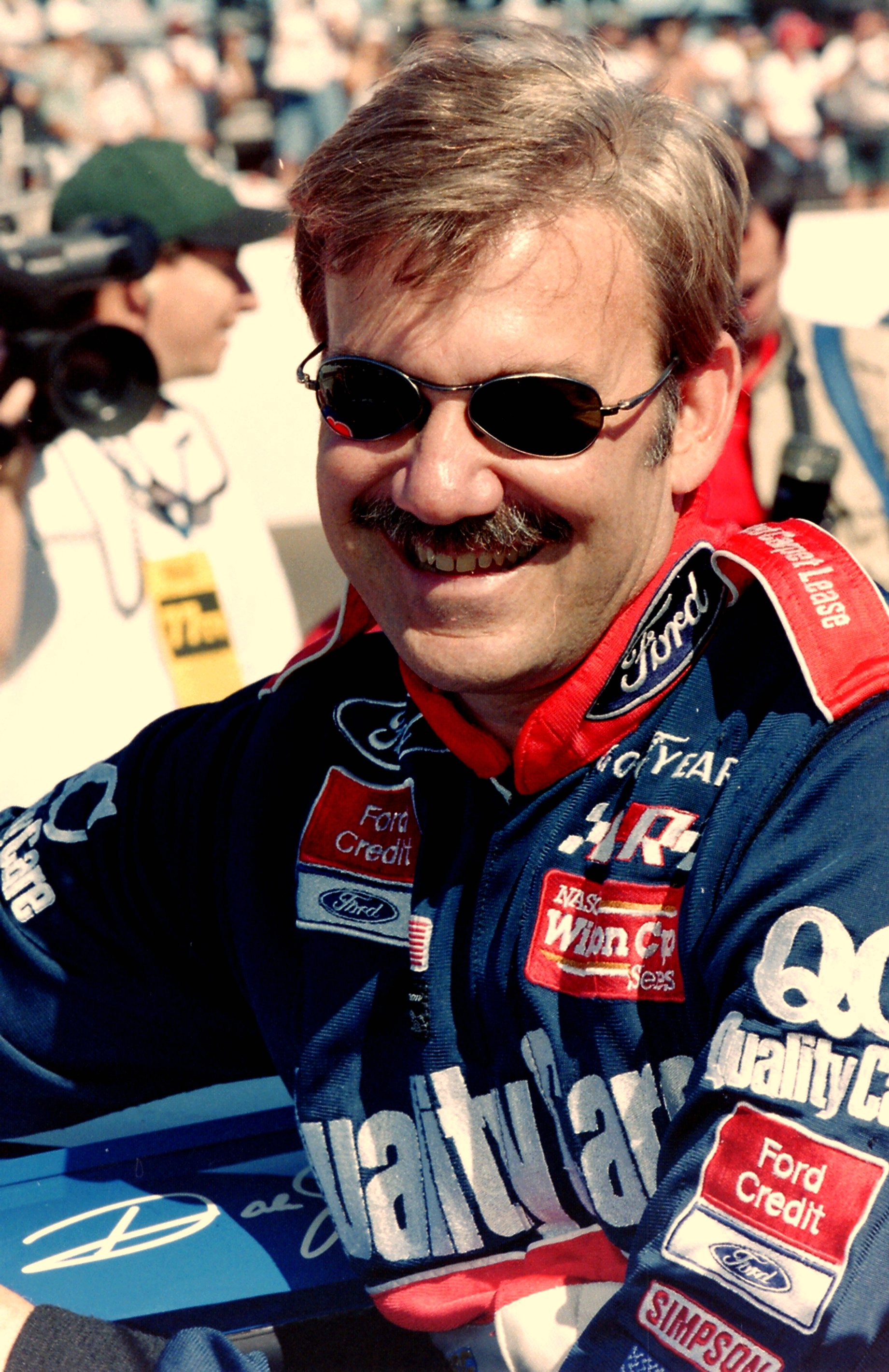
Dale Jarrett finished third in the Winston Cup standings.

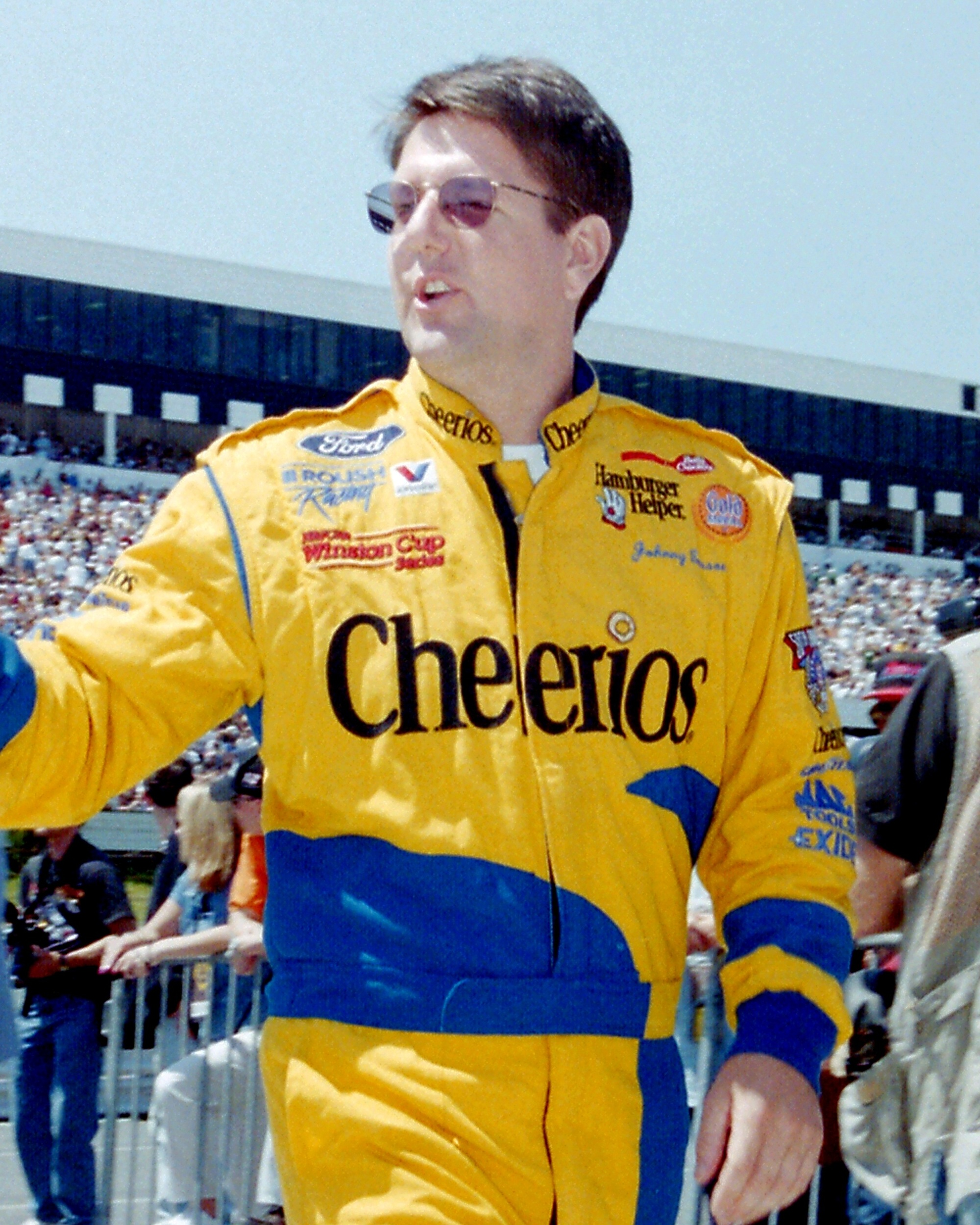
Johnny Benson, the 1996 NASCAR Rookie of the Year.

Pontiac's struggles in 1995 carried over to 1996, scoring just one win in the Dura Lube 500 with Bobby Hamilton. Hamilton was also the only Pontiac driver to finish in the top ten in points standings, placing ninth.

== Overview ==
The major story heading into 1996 was the 24-year old phenom Jeff Gordon, who won the 1995 NASCAR Winston Cup Championship. The youngest to win the Winston Cup Championship in the modern era (post 1971), Gordon looked to maintain his momentum. Dale Earnhardt, who finished second to Gordon in the point standings, was looking to make history by winning his eighth Winston Cup Championship, breaking a tie with Richard Petty. Other contenders for the Winston Cup Championship include the reigning back-to-back Daytona 500 winner and third-place points finisher Sterling Marlin, two-time runner-up points finisher Mark Martin, former Winston Cup Champions Terry Labonte and Rusty Wallace, and veteran Dale Jarrett.

The 1996 season would feature a unique series championship battle between teammates; Jeff Gordon and Terry Labonte of Hendrick Motorsports. While Gordon won ten races to Labonte's two, Labonte was more consistent than Gordon; Labonte averaged a 8.2 race finish while Gordon averaged a 9.5 race finish. This advantage for Labonte would win him a second Winston Cup Championship, edging Gordon by only 37 points.

== Teams and drivers ==
=== Complete schedule ===
| Manufacturer | Team | No. | Race driver | Crew chief |
|---|---|---|---|---|
| Chevrolet | Darrell Waltrip Motorsports | 17 | Darrell Waltrip | Pete Peterson |
| Chevrolet | Diamond Ridge Motorsports | 29 | Steve Grissom 14 | Bill Ingle |
| Chevrolet | Diamond Ridge Motorsports | 29 | Greg Sacks 6 | Bill Ingle |
| Chevrolet | Diamond Ridge Motorsports | 29 | Butch Leitzinger 1 | Bill Ingle |
| Chevrolet | Diamond Ridge Motorsports | 29 | Chad Little 5 | Bill Ingle |
| Chevrolet | Diamond Ridge Motorsports | 29 | Jeff Green 2 | Bill Ingle |
| Chevrolet | Diamond Ridge Motorsports | 29 | Robert Pressley 3 | Bill Ingle |
| Chevrolet | Hendrick Motorsports | 5 | Terry Labonte | Gary DeHart |
| Chevrolet | Hendrick Motorsports | 24 | Jeff Gordon | Ray Evernham |
| Chevrolet | Hendrick Motorsports | 25 | Ken Schrader | Phil Hammer |
| Chevrolet | Joe Gibbs Racing | 18 | Bobby Labonte | Jimmy Makar |
| Chevrolet | Larry Hedrick Motorsports | 41 | Ricky Craven | Charley Pressley |
| Chevrolet | Leo Jackson Motorsports | 33 | Robert Pressley 27 | Andy Petree |
| Chevrolet | Leo Jackson Motorsports | 33 | Greg Sacks 1 | Andy Petree |
| Chevrolet | Leo Jackson Motorsports | 33 | Todd Bodine 3 | Andy Petree |
| Chevrolet | Marcis Auto Racing | 71 | Dave Marcis | Terry Shirley |
| Chevrolet | Morgan-McClure Motorsports | 4 | Sterling Marlin | Tony Glover |
| Chevrolet | NEMCO Motorsports | 87 | Joe Nemechek | Jeff Buice |
| Chevrolet | Richard Childress Racing | 3 | Dale Earnhardt | David Smith |
| Ford | Elliott-Hardy Racing; Bill Elliott Racing | 94 | Bill Elliott 24 | Mike Beam |
| Ford | Elliott-Hardy Racing; Bill Elliott Racing | 94 | Tommy Kendall 1 | Mike Beam |
| Ford | Elliott-Hardy Racing; Bill Elliott Racing | 94 | Todd Bodine 4 | Mike Beam |
| Ford | Elliott-Hardy Racing; Bill Elliott Racing | 94 | Dorsey Schroeder 1 | Mike Beam |
| Ford | Elliott-Hardy Racing; Bill Elliott Racing | 94 | Bobby Hillin Jr. 1 | Mike Beam |
| Ford | Bobby Allison Motorsports | 12 | Derrike Cope | Jimmy Fennig |
| Ford | Brett Bodine Racing | 11 | Brett Bodine | Donnie Richeson |
| Ford | Bud Moore Engineering | 15 | Wally Dallenbach Jr. | Jimmy Means |
| Ford | Butch Mock Motorsports | 75 | Morgan Shepherd | Troy Selberg |
| Ford | Cale Yarborough Motorsports | 98 | Jeremy Mayfield 23 | Tony Furr |
| Ford | Cale Yarborough Motorsports | 98 | John Andretti 8 | Tony Furr |
| Ford | Donlavey Racing | 90 | Mike Wallace 12 | Bob Johnson |
| Ford | Donlavey Racing | 90 | Dick Trickle 19 | Bob Johnson |
| Ford | FILMAR Racing | 81 | Kenny Wallace | Gil Martin |
| Ford | Geoff Bodine Racing | 7 | Geoff Bodine | Paul Andrews |
| Ford | Geoff Bodine Racing | 7 | Dave Rezendes 1 | Paul Andrews |
| Ford | Jasper Motorsports | 77 | Bobby Hillin Jr. | Michael McSwain |
| Ford | Kranefuss-Haas Racing | 37 | John Andretti 23 | Tim Brewer |
| Ford | Kranefuss-Haas Racing | 37 | Jeremy Mayfield 8 | Tim Brewer |
| Ford | Melling Racing | 9 | Lake Speed | Jim Long |
| Ford | Penske Racing South | 2 | Rusty Wallace | Robin Pemberton |
| Ford | Robert Yates Racing | 28 | Ernie Irvan | Larry McReynolds |
| Ford | Robert Yates Racing | 88 | Dale Jarrett | Todd Parrott |
| Ford | Roush Racing | 6 | Mark Martin | Steve Hmiel; Jimmy Fennig |
| Ford | Roush Racing | 16 | Ted Musgrave | Howard Comstock |
| Ford | Roush Racing | 99 | Jeff Burton | Buddy Parrott |
| Ford | Rudd Performance Motorsports | 10 | Ricky Rudd | Richard Broome |
| Ford | Travis Carter Enterprises | 23 | Jimmy Spencer | Donnie Wingo |
| Ford | Stavola Brothers Racing | 8 | Hut Stricklin | Phillipe Lopez |
| Ford | Wood Brothers Racing | 21 | Michael Waltrip | Leonard Wood |
| Pontiac | Bahari Racing | 30 | Johnny Benson (R) | Doug Hewitt |
| Pontiac | Bill Davis Racing | 22 | Ward Burton | Chris Hussey |
| Pontiac | Petty Enterprises | 43 | Bobby Hamilton | Robbie Loomis |
| Pontiac | Precision Products Racing | 1 | Rick Mast | Kevin Hamlin |
| Pontiac | Team SABCO | 42 | Kyle Petty 29 | William Woodruff |
| Pontiac | Team SABCO | 42 | Jim Sauter 2 | William Woodruff |

=== Limited schedule ===
| Manufacturer | Team | No. | Race driver | Crew chief | Round(s) |
|---|---|---|---|---|---|
| Chevrolet | Active Motorsports | 32 | Jimmy Hensley | | 1 |
| Chevrolet | Balough Racing | 57 | Jim Bown | | 1 |
| Chevrolet | Barkdoll Racing | 73 | Tracy Leslie | | 1 |
| Chevrolet | Barkdoll Racing | 73 | Phil Barkdoll | | 1 |
| Chevrolet | Bradberry Racing | 93 | Gary Bradberry | | 1 |
| Chevrolet | Byers Racing | 82 | Terry Byers | | 1 |
| Chevrolet | Cicci-Welliver Racing | 34 | Mike McLaughlin | | 1 |
| Chevrolet | Dale Earnhardt, Inc. | 14 | Jeff Green | | 2 |
| Chevrolet | Dale Earnhardt, Inc. | 14 | Ron Hornaday Jr. | | 1 |
| Chevrolet | Dale Earnhardt, Inc. | 14 | Robby Gordon | Dave Charpentier | 1 |
| Chevrolet | JTC Racing | 45 | Chad Little | | 1 |
| Chevrolet | Marcis Auto Racing | 72 | Jim Sauter | | 1 |
| Chevrolet | Miles Motorsports | 02 | Robbie Faggart | | 6 |
| Chevrolet | Miles Motorsports | 02 | Randy Baker | | 1 |
| Chevrolet | Monroe Motorsports | 46 | Stacy Compton (R) | | 4 |
| Chevrolet | Phoenix Racing | 44 | Jeff Purvis | Marc Reno | 5 |
| Chevrolet | Richard Childress Racing | 31 | Mike Skinner | | 5 |
| Chevrolet | Sadler Racing | 26 | Hermie Sadler | | 2 |
| Ford | A. J. Foyt Enterprises | 50 | A. J. Foyt | | 1 |
| Ford | Berrier Racing | 60 | Ed Berrier | | 2 |
| Ford | Bill Elliott Racing | 91 | Ron Barfield Jr. | | 1 |
| Ford | Campbell Racing | 49 | Mark Gibson | | 1 |
| Ford | Campbell Racing | 49 | Eric Smith | | 2 |
| Ford | David Blair Motorsports | 27 | Elton Sawyer | Mike Hill | 11 |
| Ford | David Blair Motorsports | 27 | Jason Keller | Mike Hill | 1 |
| Ford | David Blair Motorsports | 27 | Todd Bodine | Mike Hill | 3 |
| Ford | David Blair Motorsports | 27 | Ron Barfield Jr. | Mike Hill | 1 |
| Ford | Geoff Bodine Racing | 07 | Geoff Bodine | | 1 |
| Ford | H. L. Waters Racing | 0 | Delma Cowart | | 4 |
| Ford | Hover Motorsports | 80 | Joe Ruttman | | 1 |
| Ford | O'Neil Racing | 65 | Steve Seligman | | 3 |
| Ford | Ranier-Walsh Racing | 20 | Elton Sawyer | | 1 |
| Ford | Sadler Brothers Racing | 95 | Chuck Bown | | 6 |
| Ford | Sadler Brothers Racing | 95 | Gary Bradberry | | 13 |
| Ford | Schnell Motorsports | 63 | Dick Trickle | | 2 |
| Ford | Schnell Motorsports | 63 | Ed Berrier | | 1 |
| Ford | Schnell Motorsports | 63 | Mike Wallace | | 1 |
| Ford | Seligman Racing | 57 | Steve Seligman | | 3 |
| Ford | Triad Motorsports | 78 | Randy MacDonald (R) | | 12 |
| Ford | Triad Motorsports | 78 | Billy Standridge | | 4 |
| Ford | TriStar Motorsports | 19 | Loy Allen Jr. | Peter Sospenzo | 11 |
| Ford | TriStar Motorsports | 19 | Dick Trickle | Peter Sospenzo | 10 |
| Ford | TriStar Motorsports | 19 | Mike Wallace | Peter Sospenzo | 1 |
| Pontiac | Ken Schrader Racing | 52 | Jack Sprague | | 2 |
| Pontiac | Mark Rypien Motorsports | 97 | Chad Little | Harold Holly | 7 |
| Pontiac | T.R.I.X. Racing | 79 | Norm Benning | | 1 |
| Chevrolet Pontiac | Team SABCO | 40 | Jay Sauter | Brad Noffsinger | 2 |
| Chevrolet Pontiac | Team SABCO | 40 | Greg Sacks | Tony Glover | 2 |
| Chevrolet Pontiac | Team SABCO | 40 | Robby Gordon | Tony Glover | 2 |

== Schedule ==
| No. | Race title | Track | Date |
|---|---|---|---|
| | Busch Clash | Daytona International Speedway, Daytona Beach | February 11 |
| | Gatorade Twin 125s | Daytona International Speedway, Daytona Beach | February 15 |
| 1 | Daytona 500 | Daytona International Speedway, Daytona Beach | February 18 |
| 2 | Goodwrench Service 400 | North Carolina Motor Speedway, Rockingham | February 25 |
| 3 | Pontiac Excitement 400 | Richmond International Raceway, Richmond | March 3 |
| 4 | Purolator 500 | Atlanta Motor Speedway, Hampton | March 10 |
| 5 | TranSouth Financial 400 | Darlington Raceway, Darlington | March 24 |
| 6 | Food City 500 | Bristol Motor Speedway, Bristol | March 31 |
| 7 | First Union 400 | North Wilkesboro Speedway, North Wilkesboro | April 14 |
| 8 | Goody's Headache Powder 500 | Martinsville Speedway, Ridgeway | April 21 |
| 9 | Winston Select 500 | Talladega Superspeedway, Talladega | April 28 |
| 10 | Save Mart Supermarkets 300 | Sears Point Raceway, Sonoma | May 5 |
| | Winston Open | Charlotte Motor Speedway, Concord | May 20 |
| | The Winston Select | Charlotte Motor Speedway, Concord | May 20 |
| 11 | Coca-Cola 600 | Charlotte Motor Speedway, Concord | May 26 |
| 12 | Miller 500 | Dover Downs International Speedway, Dover | June 2 |
| 13 | UAW-GM Teamwork 500 | Pocono Raceway, Long Pond | June 16 |
| 14 | Miller 400 | Michigan Speedway, Brooklyn | June 23 |
| 15 | Pepsi 400 | Daytona International Speedway, Daytona Beach | July 6 |
| 16 | Jiffy Lube 300 | New Hampshire International Speedway, Loudon | July 14 |
| 17 | Miller 500 | Pocono Raceway, Long Pond | July 21 |
| 18 | DieHard 500 | Talladega Superspeedway, Talladega | July 28 |
| 19 | Brickyard 400 | Indianapolis Motor Speedway, Speedway | August 3 |
| 20 | The Bud at The Glen | Watkins Glen International, Watkins Glen | August 11 |
| 21 | GM Goodwrench Dealer 400 | Michigan Speedway, Brooklyn | August 18 |
| 22 | Goody's Headache Powder 500 | Bristol Motor Speedway, Bristol | August 24 |
| 23 | Mountain Dew Southern 500 | Darlington Raceway, Darlington | September 1 |
| 24 | Miller 400 | Richmond International Raceway, Richmond | September 7 |
| 25 | MBNA 500 | Dover Downs International Speedway, Dover | September 15 |
| 26 | Hanes 500 | Martinsville Speedway, Ridgeway | September 22 |
| 27 | Tyson Holly Farms 400 | North Wilkesboro Speedway, North Wilkesboro | September 29 |
| 28 | UAW-GM Quality 500 | Charlotte Motor Speedway, Concord | October 6 |
| 29 | AC Delco 400 | North Carolina Motor Speedway, Rockingham | October 20 |
| 30 | Dura Lube 500 | Phoenix International Raceway, Phoenix | October 27 |
| 31 | NAPA 500 | Atlanta Motor Speedway, Hampton | November 10 |
| | NASCAR Suzuka Thunder Special | Suzuka Circuit, Suzuka | November 24 |

== Races ==
| No. | Race | Pole position | Most laps led | Winning driver | Manufacturer |
|---|---|---|---|---|---|
| | Busch Clash | Rick Mast | Sterling Marlin | Dale Jarrett | Ford |
| | Gatorade Twin 125 #1 | Dale Earnhardt | Sterling Marlin | Dale Earnhardt | Chevrolet |
| | Gatorade Twin 125 #2 | Ernie Irvan | Ernie Irvan | Ernie Irvan | Ford |
| 1 | Daytona 500 | Dale Earnhardt | Terry Labonte | Dale Jarrett | Ford |
| 2 | Goodwrench Service 400 | Terry Labonte | Terry Labonte | Dale Earnhardt | Chevrolet |
| 3 | Pontiac Excitement 400 | Terry Labonte | Bobby Hamilton | Jeff Gordon | Chevrolet |
| 4 | Purolator 500 | Johnny Benson Jr. | Dale Earnhardt | Dale Earnhardt | Chevrolet |
| 5 | TranSouth Financial 400 | Ward Burton | Jeff Gordon | Jeff Gordon | Chevrolet |
| 6 | Food City 500 | Mark Martin | Jeff Gordon | Jeff Gordon | Chevrolet |
| 7 | First Union 400 | Terry Labonte | Terry Labonte | Terry Labonte | Chevrolet |
| 8 | Goody's Headache Powder 500 | Ricky Craven | Jeff Gordon | Rusty Wallace | Ford |
| 9 | Winston Select 500 | Ernie Irvan | Sterling Marlin | Sterling Marlin | Chevrolet |
| 10 | Save Mart Supermarkets 300 | Terry Labonte | Rusty Wallace | Rusty Wallace | Ford |
| | Winston Open | Lake Speed | Lake Speed | Jimmy Spencer | Ford |
| | The Winston Select | Jeff Gordon | Terry Labonte | Michael Waltrip | Ford |
| 11 | Coca-Cola 600 | Jeff Gordon | Dale Jarrett | Dale Jarrett | Ford |
| 12 | Miller 500 | Jeff Gordon | Jeff Gordon | Jeff Gordon | Chevrolet |
| 13 | UAW-GM Teamwork 500 | Jeff Gordon | Jeff Gordon | Jeff Gordon | Chevrolet |
| 14 | Miller 400 | Bobby Hamilton | Sterling Marlin | Rusty Wallace | Ford |
| 15 | Pepsi 400 | Jeff Gordon | Sterling Marlin | Sterling Marlin | Chevrolet |
| 16 | Jiffy Lube 300 | Ricky Craven | Jeff Gordon | Ernie Irvan | Ford |
| 17 | Miller 500 | Mark Martin | Mark Martin | Rusty Wallace | Ford |
| 18 | DieHard 500 | Jeremy Mayfield | Dale Earnhardt | Jeff Gordon | Chevrolet |
| 19 | Brickyard 400 | Jeff Gordon | Johnny Benson Jr. | Dale Jarrett | Ford |
| 20 | The Bud at The Glen | Dale Earnhardt | Dale Earnhardt | Geoff Bodine | Ford |
| 21 | GM Goodwrench Dealer 400 | Jeff Burton | Mark Martin | Dale Jarrett | Ford |
| 22 | Goody's Headache Powder 500 | Mark Martin | Rusty Wallace | Rusty Wallace | Ford |
| 23 | Mountain Dew Southern 500 | Dale Jarrett | Hut Stricklin | Jeff Gordon | Chevrolet |
| 24 | Miller 400 | Mark Martin | Jeff Gordon | Ernie Irvan | Ford |
| 25 | MBNA 500 | Bobby Labonte | Jeff Gordon | Jeff Gordon | Chevrolet |
| 26 | Hanes 500 | Bobby Hamilton | Bobby Hamilton | Jeff Gordon | Chevrolet |
| 27 | Tyson Holly Farms 400 | Ted Musgrave | Jeff Gordon | Jeff Gordon | Chevrolet |
| 28 | UAW-GM Quality 500 | Bobby Labonte | Terry Labonte | Terry Labonte | Chevrolet |
| 29 | AC Delco 400 | Dale Jarrett | Dale Jarrett | Ricky Rudd | Ford |
| 30 | Dura Lube 500 | Bobby Labonte | Mark Martin | Bobby Hamilton | Pontiac |
| 31 | NAPA 500 | Bobby Labonte | Bobby Labonte | Bobby Labonte | Chevrolet |

=== Busch Clash ===
The Busch Clash is the exhibition race that honors the drivers who won a pole in the NASCAR Winston Cup Series the previous year. Dale Jarrett won his first Busch Clash. Rick Mast won the random draw for the pole.

Top ten results

1. #88 - Dale Jarrett
2. #4 - Sterling Marlin
3. #3 - Dale Earnhardt
4. #5 - Terry Labonte
5. #25 - Ken Schrader
6. #10 - Ricky Rudd
7. #6 - Mark Martin
8. #94 - Bill Elliott
9. #24 - Jeff Gordon
10. #16 - Ted Musgrave
- For the second and final time, the winner of the most poles in the NASCAR Busch Series the previous year was invited to compete, with David Green being the winner both times.

=== Gatorade Twin 125s ===
The Gatorade Twin 125s, qualifying races for the Daytona 500, were held on February 15.

Race one top ten results

1. #3 - Dale Earnhardt
2. #4 - Sterling Marlin*
3. #5 - Terry Labonte
4. #88 - Dale Jarrett
5. #15 - Wally Dallenbach Jr.
6. #21 - Michael Waltrip
7. #22 - Ward Burton
8. #6 - Mark Martin
9. #90 - Mike Wallace
10. #23 - Jimmy Spencer
- Marlin passed Earnhardt on the opening lap but Earnhardt repassed and led the last 22 laps.
- Bobby Labonte flipped over on the backstretch after being tagged by Brett Bodine.

Race two top ten results

1. #28 - Ernie Irvan*
2. #25 - Ken Schrader
3. #37 - John Andretti
4. #24 - Jeff Gordon
5. #10 - Ricky Rudd
6. #75 - Morgan Shepherd
7. #98 - Jeremy Mayfield
8. #99 - Jeff Burton
9. #27 - Elton Sawyer
10. #16 - Ted Musgrave
- Irvan led wire-to-wire with Schrader alongside in the final lap.

=== Daytona 500 ===
Top ten results:

1. #88 - Dale Jarrett*
2. #3 - Dale Earnhardt
3. #25 - Ken Schrader
4. #6 - Mark Martin
5. #99 - Jeff Burton
6. #15 - Wally Dallenbach Jr.
7. #16 - Ted Musgrave
8. #94 - Bill Elliott
9. #10 - Ricky Rudd
10. #21 - Michael Waltrip
- This was Dale Jarrett's second career Daytona 500 victory. Both of those victories saw Dale Earnhardt finish second to Jarrett.
- When the white flag was displayed, play-by-play analyst Ken Squier gave the privileges to color analyst Ned Jarrett so he can call the final lap solo and lead his son on to the victory, as he did in 1993.

=== Goodwrench Service 400 ===
The Goodwrench Service 400 was held on February 25 at North Carolina Speedway. Terry Labonte won the pole.

Top ten results

1. #3 - Dale Earnhardt*
2. #88 - Dale Jarrett
3. #41 - Ricky Craven
4. #10 - Ricky Rudd
5. #29 - Steve Grissom
6. #4 - Sterling Marlin
7. #81 - Kenny Wallace
8. #12 - Derrike Cope, 1 lap down
9. #87 - Joe Nemechek, 1 lap down
10. #1 - Rick Mast, 2 laps down

Failed to qualify: #27 - Elton Sawyer, #78 - Randy MacDonald, #93 - Gary Bradberry, #63 - Dick Trickle

- Loy Allen crashed with a flat tire on lap 172, suffering neck injuries that forced him to sit out until June.
- Dale Earnhardt and Bobby Hamilton traded the lead three times in three laps when Earnhardt punted Hamilton in Turn 4 on lap 343. Hamilton scraped the wall and later crashed because of damage from the earlier scrape.
- Jeff Gordon finished 40th after suffering a blown engine, resulting in Gordon finishing 40th or worse in the first two races of the season.

=== Pontiac Excitement 400 ===
The Pontiac Excitement 400 was run on March 3 at Richmond International Raceway. Terry Labonte won the pole.

Top ten results

1. #24 - Jeff Gordon
2. #88 - Dale Jarrett
3. #16 - Ted Musgrave
4. #99 - Jeff Burton
5. #6 - Mark Martin
6. #43 - Bobby Hamilton
7. #2 - Rusty Wallace
8. #5 - Terry Labonte
9. #10 - Ricky Rudd
10. #94 - Bill Elliott

Failed to qualify: #78 - Randy MacDonald, #02 - Robbie Faggart, #19 - Dick Trickle

- Entering this race, Terry Labonte was 30th in the points standings, despite leading the most laps at Daytona and Rockingham, while Jeff Gordon was 43rd. After this race they were 17th and 27th, respectively.

=== Purolator 500 ===
The Purolator 500 was run on March 10 at Atlanta Motor Speedway. Johnny Benson won the pole, but started in the back after crashing in Happy Hour.

Top ten results

1. #3 - Dale Earnhardt*
2. #5 - Terry Labonte
3. #24 - Jeff Gordon
4. #28 - Ernie Irvan
5. #98 - Jeremy Mayfield
6. #25 - Ken Schrader
7. #23 - Jimmy Spencer, 1 lap down
8. #10 - Ricky Rudd, 1 lap down
9. #21 - Michael Waltrip, 1 lap down
10. #94 - Bill Elliott, 1 lap down

Failed to qualify: #65 - Steve Seligman, #78 - Randy MacDonald, #99 - Jeff Burton*

- Jeff Burton failing to qualify sparked a lot of controversy, as he was 2nd in the points standings going into this race. Provisionals for the first 4 races defaulted from 1995 driver and owner points, and he missed the field due to the Roush Racing #99 car being a new team for 1996. As a result, Burton fell from 2nd to 14th in the standings, and never reentered the top-10 in points for the rest of the season.
- This would be Dale Earnhardt's last Cup Series victory until the 1998 Daytona 500.

=== TranSouth Financial 400 ===
The TranSouth Financial 400 was run on March 24 at Darlington Raceway. Ward Burton won the pole.

Top ten results

1. #24 - Jeff Gordon
2. #18 - Bobby Labonte
3. #41 - Ricky Craven
4. #2 - Rusty Wallace
5. #5 - Terry Labonte
6. #6 - Mark Martin
7. #16 - Ted Musgrave
8. #75 - Morgan Shepherd, 1 lap down
9. #10 - Ricky Rudd, 1 lap down
10. #99 - Jeff Burton, 1 lap down

Failed to qualify: #95 - Chuck Bown, #78 - Randy MacDonald, #02 - Robbie Faggart, #32 - Jimmy Hensley

=== Food City 500 ===
The Food City 500 was run on March 31 at Bristol International Raceway. Mark Martin won the pole. The race was shortened to 342 laps due to rain.

Top ten results

1. #24 - Jeff Gordon
2. #5 - Terry Labonte
3. #6 - Mark Martin
4. #3 - Dale Earnhardt
5. #2 - Rusty Wallace
6. #88 - Dale Jarrett
7. #18 - Bobby Labonte, 1 lap down
8. #19 - Dick Trickle, 1 lap down
9. #41 - Ricky Craven, 1 lap down
10. #21 - Michael Waltrip, 2 laps down

Failed to qualify: #90 - Mike Wallace, #37 - John Andretti, #30 - Johnny Benson, #71 - Dave Marcis, #77 - Bobby Hillin Jr., #95 - Chuck Bown

- There were 3 red flags during the race. Prior to the first red flag, Bill Elliott crashed on lap 321 prior to the caution for rain. After the race resumed following a 1-hour rain delay, Darrell Waltrip crashed and spilled fuel, which caused another stoppage on lap 335. Moments after the race resumed, more rain came down. With dusk settling in, the rain continued and the race was stopped.
- Final race at this track under the name Bristol International Raceway.

=== First Union 400 ===
The First Union 400 was run on April 14 at North Wilkesboro Speedway. Terry Labonte won the pole.

Top ten results

1. #5 - Terry Labonte*
2. #24 - Jeff Gordon
3. #3 - Dale Earnhardt
4. #33 - Robert Pressley
5. #4 - Sterling Marlin
6. #28 - Ernie Irvan, 1 lap down
7. #41 - Ricky Craven, 1 lap down
8. #43 - Bobby Hamilton, 2 laps down
9. #25 - Ken Schrader, 2 laps down
10. #18 - Bobby Labonte, 2 laps down

Failed to qualify: #71 - Dave Marcis, #78 - Randy MacDonald, #90 - Mike Wallace, #22 - Ward Burton, #77 - Bobby Hillin Jr.

- Terry Labonte tied Richard Petty's record streak of 513 consecutive Winston Cup Series starts. Labonte's car carried a special silver "Ironman" paint scheme for this race and the following weekend at Martinsville.

=== Goody's Headache Powder 500 ===
The Goody's Headache Powder 500 was run on April 21 at Martinsville Speedway. Ricky Craven won the pole.

Top ten results

1. #2 - Rusty Wallace*
2. #28 - Ernie Irvan
3. #24 - Jeff Gordon
4. #98 - Jeremy Mayfield
5. #3 - Dale Earnhardt
6. #43 - Bobby Hamilton, 1 lap down
7. #25 - Ken Schrader, 2 laps down
8. #18 - Bobby Labonte, 2 laps down
9. #16 - Ted Musgrave, 2 laps down
10. #4 - Sterling Marlin, 2 laps down

Failed to qualify: #78 - Randy MacDonald, #27 - Elton Sawyer, #29 - Steve Grissom, #19 - Dick Trickle, #77 - Bobby Hillin Jr., #15 - Wally Dallenbach Jr., #22 - Ward Burton

- This was Rusty Wallace's fourth consecutive victory in the Martinsville spring race, the only driver in history to accomplish this feat.
- By starting this race, Terry Labonte achieved 514 consecutive Cup Series starts, breaking the record held by Richard Petty.

=== Winston Select 500 ===
The Winston Select 500 was run on April 28 at Talladega Superspeedway. Ernie Irvan won the pole.

Top 10 results

1. #4 - Sterling Marlin*
2. #88 - Dale Jarrett
3. #3 - Dale Earnhardt
4. #5 - Terry Labonte
5. #21 - Michael Waltrip
6. #29 - Steve Grissom
7. #33 - Robert Pressley
8. #16 - Ted Musgrave
9. #37 - John Andretti
10. #30 - Johnny Benson

Failed to qualify: #73 - Phil Barkdoll, #65 - Steve Seligman, #77 - Bobby Hillin Jr., #0 - Delma Cowart, #97 - Chad Little

- Controversy developed before the race; after winning the pole, Ernie Irvan's Ford was taken to a flatbed-mounted chassis dynamometer and "driven" by Gary Nelson to check horsepower; the engine was over-revved and subsequently damaged beyond repair. Sterling Marlin's Chevrolet was supposed to be tested as well but the chassis dyno failed to produce a horsepower figure and the test was scrapped. Several reporters in the garage area questioned Nelson on the test and crew chief Larry McReynolds got into a heated dispute with Nelson over the test. Irvan struggled in the race and later crashed out. In an interview afterwards, Irvan stated "It's all a result of what happened on Friday when (NASCAR) blew our motor up."
- Two major accidents marred the race: Bill Elliott suffered a broken femur after going airborne and landing driver side-first in a single-car crash on lap 77. Then Ricky Craven sustained compression fractures in his back, a concussion, and multiple bruises when his car flipped into the catch fence in a 14-car pileup on lap 131. The race was red-flagged for clean-up and fence repairs. Bob Jenkins, ESPN's lap-by-lap announcer, was so shocked by the crash that he said "Oh shit!" over the raw satellite feed when Craven's car was flipping. Elliott's broken leg forced him to miss the next five races, while Craven's injuries derailed what had been a successful 1996 campaign, as he entered this race 4th in points, and would fall to 20th by season's end.
- Sterling Marlin won by passing the entire field on three separate occasions after pit stops.

=== Save Mart Supermarkets 300 ===
The Save Mart Supermarkets 300 was run on May 5 at Sears Point Raceway. Terry Labonte won the pole.

Top ten results

1. #2 - Rusty Wallace
2. #6 - Mark Martin
3. #15 - Wally Dallenbach Jr.
4. #3 - Dale Earnhardt
5. #5 - Terry Labonte
6. #24 - Jeff Gordon
7. #10 - Ricky Rudd
8. #25 - Ken Schrader
9. #18 - Bobby Labonte
10. #22 - Ward Burton

Failed to qualify: #07 - Geoff Bodine*, #45 - Chad Little, #20 - Mark Krogh, #03 - Joe Bean, #58 - Wayne Jacks, #02 - Bill McAnally, #07W - Lance Hooper

- Geoff Bodine replaced Dave Rezendes in the #7 in the race.
- Tommy Kendall and Ron Hornaday Jr. served as relief drivers for Bill Elliott and Ricky Craven respectively, as they were both still recovering from injuries suffered at Talladega.

=== The Winston Select ===
The Winston Select was the 2nd exhibition race of the season, run on May 18 at Charlotte Motor Speedway. Lake Speed won the pole for the Open, while Jeff Gordon won the pole for the main race. The top-5 finishers from the open would transfer to the main event.

Top ten results (Open)

1. #23 - Jimmy Spencer
2. #9 - Lake Speed
3. #8 - Hut Stricklin
4. #99 - Jeff Burton
5. #21 - Michael Waltrip
6. #30 - Johnny Benson Jr.
7. #11 - Brett Bodine
8. #75 - Morgan Shepherd
9. #43 - Bobby Hamilton
10. #29 - Steve Grissom

Top ten results

1. #21 - Michael Waltrip*
2. #2 - Rusty Wallace
3. #3 - Dale Earnhardt
4. #6 - Mark Martin
5. #5 - Terry Labonte
6. #10 - Ricky Rudd
7. #28 - Ernie Irvan
8. #24 - Jeff Gordon
9. #88 - Dale Jarrett
10. #4 - Sterling Marlin
- Harry Gant came out of retirement for this race to sub for Bill Elliott who was recovering from the injuries he suffered at Talladega in April.
- Michael Waltrip's victory made him the first driver to win the Winston Select after transferring from the Open, and the first driver to win it before winning his first Cup Series points race.

=== Coca-Cola 600 ===
The Coca-Cola 600 was run on May 26 at Charlotte Motor Speedway. Jeff Gordon won the pole.

Top ten results

1. #88 - Dale Jarrett
2. #3 - Dale Earnhardt
3. #5 - Terry Labonte
4. #24 - Jeff Gordon
5. #25 - Ken Schrader, 1 lap down
6. #4 - Sterling Marlin, 1 lap down
7. #6 - Mark Martin, 1 lap down
8. #21 - Michael Waltrip, 1 lap down
9. #28 - Ernie Irvan, 2 laps down
10. #7 - Geoff Bodine, 2 laps down

Failed to qualify: #78 - Randy MacDonald, #63 - Ed Berrier, #26 - Hermie Sadler, #49 - Mark Gibson, #02 - Robbie Faggart, #0 - Delma Cowart, #57 - Steve Seligman

- Johnny Benson was knocked unconscious briefly when his Pontiac hit the turn two wall then slid into the path of Ricky Craven, who blasted through the rear deck of his car at full speed.

=== Miller 500 (Dover) ===
The Miller 500 was run on June 2 at Dover Downs International Speedway. Jeff Gordon won the pole.

Top ten results

1. #24 - Jeff Gordon
2. #5 - Terry Labonte
3. #3 - Dale Earnhardt
4. #28 - Ernie Irvan
5. #18 - Bobby Labonte, 1 lap down
6. #23 - Jimmy Spencer, 1 lap down
7. #2 - Rusty Wallace, 1 lap down
8. #10 - Ricky Rudd, 1 lap down
9. #99 - Jeff Burton, 1 lap down
10. #25 - Ken Schrader, 1 lap down

Failed to qualify: none

- Team SABCO arrived at Dover with Kyle Petty's #42 Pontiac painted in the same black and silver paint scheme as Dale Earnhardt's #3 Chevrolet, with the motto "Todo es justo en amor y carreras" ("All's fair in love and careers") written on the door behind the number. The scheme was an act of protest against a rough driving penalty served against Petty for an incident in the previous race at Charlotte, with the team claiming that Earnhardt did a similar move on Bobby Hamilton at Rockingham in February and didn't get penalized, accusing NASCAR of giving Earnhardt special treatment. Petty started 15th and finished 18th, with the car returning to its normal Coors Light scheme the next week.

=== UAW-GM Teamwork 500 ===
The UAW-GM Teamwork 500 was run on June 16 at Pocono Raceway. Jeff Gordon won the pole.

Top ten results

1. #24 - Jeff Gordon
2. #10 - Ricky Rudd
3. #7 - Geoff Bodine
4. #6 - Mark Martin
5. #43 - Bobby Hamilton
6. #75 - Morgan Shepherd
7. #5 - Terry Labonte
8. #23 - Jimmy Spencer
9. #99 - Jeff Burton
10. #94 - Todd Bodine*

Failed to qualify: #71 - Dave Marcis

- Todd Bodine was subbing for Bill Elliott, who was still recovering from his broken femur at Talladega.
- Dale Earnhardt Inc. made its Cup Series debut in this race, fielding the #14 Chevrolet driven by Jeff Green. Green started 33rd and finished 36th.

=== Miller 400 (Michigan) ===
The Miller 400 was run on June 23 at Michigan Speedway. Bobby Hamilton won the pole.

Top ten results

1. #2 - Rusty Wallace
2. #5 - Terry Labonte
3. #4 - Sterling Marlin
4. #23 - Jimmy Spencer
5. #28 - Ernie Irvan
6. #24 - Jeff Gordon
7. #6 - Mark Martin
8. #16 - Ted Musgrave
9. #3 - Dale Earnhardt
10. #88 - Dale Jarrett

Failed to qualify: none

=== Pepsi 400 ===
The Pepsi 400 was run on July 6 at Daytona International Speedway. Jeff Gordon started on the pole. The race was shortened to 117 laps due to rain.

Top ten results

1. #4 - Sterling Marlin
2. #5 - Terry Labonte
3. #24 - Jeff Gordon
4. #3 - Dale Earnhardt
5. #28 - Ernie Irvan
6. #88 - Dale Jarrett
7. #21 - Michael Waltrip
8. #25 - Ken Schrader
9. #11 - Brett Bodine
10. #23 - Jimmy Spencer

Failed to qualify: #57 - Steve Seligman

- Bill Elliott returned in this race from his broken femur suffered back at Talladega.
- Morning rain delayed the start for 3 hours.

=== Jiffy Lube 300 ===
The Jiffy Lube 300 was run on July 14 at New Hampshire International Speedway. Ricky Craven won the pole.

Top ten results

1. #28 - Ernie Irvan*
2. #88 - Dale Jarrett
3. #10 - Ricky Rudd
4. #99 - Jeff Burton
5. #33 - Robert Pressley
6. #5 - Terry Labonte
7. #2 - Rusty Wallace
8. #25 - Ken Schrader
9. #30 - Johnny Benson
10. #21 - Michael Waltrip

Failed to qualify: #19 - Loy Allen Jr.

- This was Ernie Irvan's first Cup Series victory since his comeback from near-fatal injuries at Michigan in 1994.

=== Miller 500 (Pocono) ===
The Miller 500 was run on July 21 at Pocono Raceway. Mark Martin won the pole.

Top ten results

1. #2 - Rusty Wallace
2. #10 - Ricky Rudd
3. #88 - Dale Jarrett
4. #28 - Ernie Irvan
5. #30 - Johnny Benson
6. #4 - Sterling Marlin
7. #24 - Jeff Gordon
8. #9 - Lake Speed
9. #6 - Mark Martin
10. #12 - Derrike Cope

Failed to qualify: none

=== DieHard 500 ===
The DieHard 500 was run on July 28 at Talladega Superspeedway. Jeremy Mayfield won the pole. The race started late due to rain delays, and was shortened to 129 laps due to darkness.

Top ten results

1. #24 - Jeff Gordon
2. #88 - Dale Jarrett
3. #6 - Mark Martin
4. #28 - Ernie Irvan
5. #23 - Jimmy Spencer
6. #7 - Geoff Bodine
7. #99 - Jeff Burton
8. #18 - Bobby Labonte
9. #17 - Darrell Waltrip
10. #2 - Rusty Wallace

Failed to qualify: #97 - Chad Little

- On lap 117, contact from Ernie Irvan sent Dale Earnhardt and Sterling Marlin head-on into the tri-oval wall, causing an 11-car pileup. Earnhardt's car flipped over, and took two hits to the roof from Derrike Cope and Robert Pressley. Earnhardt suffered a broken collarbone and sternum in the crash while Marlin suffered several contusions.
- This was the last NASCAR Cup Series points race televised on tape delay. CBS moved away from its live coverage during the rain delay in order to show the final round of the Senior PGA Tour Ameritech Senior Open. The race aired flag to flag on tape delay the following week.
- This was the last Talladega race to be run in July. Starting in 1997, the race would be held in October, where temperatures would be cooler and the weather more suitable.

=== Brickyard 400 ===
The Brickyard 400 was run on August 3 at Indianapolis Motor Speedway. Jeff Gordon won the pole.

Top ten results

1. #88 - Dale Jarrett
2. #28 - Ernie Irvan
3. #5 - Terry Labonte
4. #6 - Mark Martin
5. #75 - Morgan Shepherd
6. #10 - Ricky Rudd
7. #2 - Rusty Wallace
8. #30 - Johnny Benson
9. #1 - Rick Mast
10. #94 - Bill Elliott

Failed to qualify: #91 - Ron Barfield Jr., #27 - Jason Keller, #78 - Randy MacDonald, #46 - Stacy Compton, #02 - Robbie Faggart, #50 - A. J. Foyt, #57 - Steve Seligman, #44 - Jeff Purvis, #19 - Loy Allen Jr., #49 - Erik Smith, #63 - Mike Wallace

- Mike Skinner served as a relief driver for Dale Earnhardt, who was recovering from injuries suffered at Talladega. Skinner took over the car during the first caution and finished 15th.
- A violent crash occurred on lap 38 when Kyle Petty blew his right front tire and hit the turn 4 wall. Petty drifted into the path of Sterling Marlin, who hit Petty on the driver's side. Petty's car bounced into the wall again, just in front of Mark Martin who barely managed to get by, then sped across the track and hard into the inside barrier. Petty escaped with minor injuries.
- During the weekend, a fight erupted in the garage area between Ernie Irvan and Sterling Marlin and some crewmen from Morgan-McClure Motorsports over the crash at Talladega the previous weekend. Some of Marlin's crew had posted signs in the garage area deriding Irvan and mocking his eyesight.

=== The Bud at The Glen ===
The Bud at The Glen was run on August 11 at Watkins Glen International. Dale Earnhardt won the pole with a new track record of 120.733 mph while driving with the injuries suffered 2 weeks earlier. When asked what he thought of the lap, he was quoted as saying "It hurt so good."

Top ten results

1. #7 - Geoff Bodine
2. #5 - Terry Labonte
3. #6 - Mark Martin
4. #24 - Jeff Gordon
5. #18 - Bobby Labonte
6. #3 - Dale Earnhardt*
7. #21 - Michael Waltrip
8. #87 - Joe Nemechek
9. #75 - Morgan Shepherd
10. #15 - Wally Dallenbach Jr.

Failed to qualify: #34 - Mike McLaughlin

- This was Geoff Bodine's final Cup Series victory, and his first since October 1994, breaking a 55-race winless streak.
- This was the last pole position for Dale Earnhardt.
- David Green was on standby by to relieve Dale Earnhardt during the race, but Earnhardt decided to complete the full race, eventually finishing 6th.
- Dorsey Schroeder replaced an injured Bill Elliott in Elliott's #94 car for this race. Elliott would serve as a guest commentator on ESPN's coverage until lap 54.
- Todd Bodine ended up relieving Kyle Petty, as Petty was recovering from injuries suffered at Indianapolis.

=== GM Goodwrench Dealer 400 ===
The GM Goodwrench Dealer 400 was run on August 18 at Michigan Speedway. Jeff Burton won the pole.

Top ten results

1. #88 - Dale Jarrett
2. #6 - Mark Martin
3. #5 - Terry Labonte
4. #28 - Ernie Irvan
5. #24 - Jeff Gordon
6. #18 - Bobby Labonte
7. #30 - Johnny Benson
8. #10 - Ricky Rudd
9. #99 - Jeff Burton
10. #23 - Jimmy Spencer

Failed to qualify: #14 - Ron Hornaday Jr., #27 - Elton Sawyer

=== Goody's Headache Powder 500 (Bristol) ===
The Goody's Headache Powder 500 was run on August 24 at Bristol Motor Speedway. Mark Martin won the pole.

Top ten results

1. #2 - Rusty Wallace
2. #24 - Jeff Gordon
3. #6 - Mark Martin
4. #88 - Dale Jarrett
5. #5 - Terry Labonte
6. #21 - Michael Waltrip
7. #23 - Jimmy Spencer
8. #22 - Ward Burton
9. #10 - Ricky Rudd
10. #43 - Bobby Hamilton

Failed to qualify: #77 - Bobby Hillin Jr.

=== Mountain Dew Southern 500 ===
The Mountain Dew Southern 500 was run on September 1 at Darlington Raceway. Dale Jarrett won the pole.

Top ten results

1. #24 - Jeff Gordon
2. #8 - Hut Stricklin*
3. #6 - Mark Martin
4. #25 - Ken Schrader, 1 lap down
5. #37 - John Andretti, 1 lap down
6. #18 - Bobby Labonte, 1 lap down
7. #28 - Ernie Irvan, 1 lap down
8. #4 - Sterling Marlin, 1 lap down
9. #94 - Bill Elliott, 1 lap down
10. #9 - Lake Speed, 1 lap down

Failed to qualify: #78 - Randy MacDonald, #87 - Joe Nemechek, #40 - Jay Sauter, #02 - Robbie Faggart

- Dale Jarrett had the chance to win the Winston Million if he won this race. Jarrett's run ended on lap 47 after hitting the wall due to oil on the track. Jarrett finished 2 laps down in 14th.
- Hut Stricklin led the most laps in the race and was in position for his first career Winston Cup victory in his 217th start, but Jeff Gordon passed Stricklin for the lead on the backstretch on lap 353 and proceeded to win by over 5 seconds.
- John Andretti and Jeremy Mayfield switched teams after this race, with Mayfield moving to the Kranefuss-Haas Racing #37, and Andretti moving to the Cale Yarborough Motorsports #98.

=== Miller 400 (Richmond) ===
The Miller 400 was run on September 7 at Richmond International Raceway. Mark Martin won the pole.

Top ten results

1. #28 - Ernie Irvan
2. #24 - Jeff Gordon
3. #99 - Jeff Burton
4. #88 - Dale Jarrett
5. #5 - Terry Labonte
6. #2 - Rusty Wallace
7. #43 - Bobby Hamilton
8. #12 - Derrike Cope
9. #6 - Mark Martin
10. #30 - Johnny Benson

Failed to qualify: #46 - Stacy Compton, #40 - Jay Sauter, #95 - Gary Bradberry

=== MBNA 500 ===
The MBNA 500 was run on September 15 at Dover Downs International Speedway. Bobby Labonte won the pole.

Top ten results

1. #24 - Jeff Gordon
2. #2 - Rusty Wallace
3. #88 - Dale Jarrett
4. #18 - Bobby Labonte
5. #6 - Mark Martin
6. #1 - Rick Mast
7. #22 - Ward Burton
8. #42 - Kyle Petty
9. #21 - Michael Waltrip
10. #43 - Bobby Hamilton

Failed to qualify: #49 - Eric Smith

- A fight broke out between Jimmy Spencer and Wally Dallenbach Jr. after a multi-car crash on lap 456. Spencer got out of his car, ran over to Dallenbach's, and tried to punch Dallenbach through the window net. Spencer had to be restrained by a Winston Cup official.
- Another fight occurred in the garage area when Derrike Cope crashed and was assaulted by crew chief Larry McReynolds over an earlier wreck that eliminated Ernie Irvan.
- As the cars stopped on pit road after the race a third fight occurred as Kyle Petty and Michael Waltrip got into an argument.

=== Hanes 500 ===
The Hanes 500 was run on September 22 at Martinsville Speedway. Bobby Hamilton won the pole.

Top ten results

1. #24 - Jeff Gordon
2. #5 - Terry Labonte
3. #43 - Bobby Hamilton
4. #1 - Rick Mast
5. #98 - John Andretti
6. #75 - Morgan Shepherd
7. #7 - Geoff Bodine
8. #42 - Kyle Petty
9. #6 - Mark Martin, 1 lap down
10. #81 - Kenny Wallace, 1 lap down

Failed to qualify: #12 - Derrike Cope, #11 - Brett Bodine, #29 - Chad Little, #22 - Ward Burton, #78 - Billy Standridge, #95 - Gary Bradberry

- This is the fastest Martinsville race in NASCAR history, with an average speed of 82.223 mph.

=== Tyson Holly Farms 400 ===
The Tyson Holly Farms 400 was run on September 29 at North Wilkesboro Speedway. Ted Musgrave won the pole.

Top ten results

1. #24 - Jeff Gordon
2. #3 - Dale Earnhardt
3. #88 - Dale Jarrett
4. #99 - Jeff Burton
5. #5 - Terry Labonte
6. #1 - Rick Mast
7. #10 - Ricky Rudd
8. #43 - Bobby Hamilton
9. #6 - Mark Martin
10. #2 - Rusty Wallace

Failed to qualify: #22 - Ward Burton, #90 - Dick Trickle, #95 - Gary Bradberry

- This was the final NASCAR race at North Wilkesboro Speedway until 2023, which closed down after the race, and the last Cup Series points race at the track until 2026. It was the only track other than Martinsville that NASCAR had been running at since NASCAR's first full season in 1949.
- 10th and final win of 1996 for Jeff Gordon.
- Jeff Gordon became the 1st driver since Rusty Wallace in 1993 to score 10 victories in a single season.
- As of today, Jeff Gordon is the most recent driver in NASCAR to score a top 5 finish on all short track races in a single season.
- This was the final race until New Hampshire in September 2007 that had every car running at the finish.
- Only 37 cars started this race. It was the last Cup Series race in which fewer than 40 cars started until Atlanta in February 2016.

=== UAW-GM Quality 500 ===
The UAW-GM Quality 500 was run on October 6 at Charlotte Motor Speedway. Bobby Labonte won the pole.

Top ten results

1. #5 - Terry Labonte*
2. #6 - Mark Martin
3. #88 - Dale Jarrett
4. #4 - Sterling Marlin
5. #41 - Ricky Craven
6. #3 - Dale Earnhardt
7. #22 - Ward Burton
8. #2 - Rusty Wallace
9. #21 - Michael Waltrip
10. #94 - Bill Elliott

Failed to qualify: #87 - Joe Nemechek, #95 - Gary Bradberry, #71 - Dave Marcis, #02 - Robbie Faggart, #0 - Delma Cowart

- Ernie Irvan escaped serious injury on lap 210 when he spun in turn two, clipped Robby Gordon, then got slammed into by John Andretti while Gordon hit the inside concrete wall with enough force to dislodge it.
- With Terry Labonte winning and Jeff Gordon finishing 31st, Gordon's championship lead over Labonte went from 111 points to just 1 point.

=== AC Delco 400 ===
The AC Delco 400 was run on October 20 at North Carolina Motor Speedway. Dale Jarrett won the pole.

Top ten results

1. #10 - Ricky Rudd
2. #88 - Dale Jarrett
3. #5 - Terry Labonte*
4. #28 - Ernie Irvan
5. #99 - Jeff Burton
6. #18 - Bobby Labonte
7. #6 - Mark Martin
8. #2 - Rusty Wallace
9. #3 - Dale Earnhardt
10. #23 - Jimmy Spencer

Failed to qualify: #60 - Ed Berrier, #79 - Norm Benning, #82 - Terry Byers

- Terry Labonte finished 3rd while Jeff Gordon finished 12th, allowing Labonte to take the points lead from Gordon, and he would hold it for the rest of the season.

=== Dura Lube 500 ===
The Dura Lube 500 was run on October 27 at Phoenix International Raceway. Bobby Labonte won the pole.

Top ten results

1. #43 - Bobby Hamilton*
2. #6 - Mark Martin
3. #5 - Terry Labonte*
4. #16 - Ted Musgrave
5. #24 - Jeff Gordon
6. #7 - Geoff Bodine
7. #28 - Ernie Irvan
8. #88 - Dale Jarrett
9. #18 - Bobby Labonte
10. #17 - Darrell Waltrip

Failed to qualify: #20 - Mark Krogh, #00 - Scott Gaylord, #35 - Larry Gunselman, #38 - Rich Woodland, #03 - Joe Bean, #02 - Bill McAnally

- This was Bobby Hamilton's first career Cup Series victory, and the first for Petty Enterprises since 1983.
- 44 cars started the race, the last Cup race to date to have more than 43 starters.
- Terry Labonte finished ahead of Jeff Gordon, extending his points lead to 47 points over Gordon going into the finale at Atlanta.

=== NAPA 500 ===
The NAPA 500 was run on November 10 at Atlanta Motor Speedway. Bobby Labonte won the pole.

Top ten results

1. #18 - Bobby Labonte
2. #88 - Dale Jarrett
3. #24 - Jeff Gordon
4. #3 - Dale Earnhardt
5. #5 - Terry Labonte*
6. #43 - Bobby Hamilton
7. #6 - Mark Martin
8. #10 - Ricky Rudd
9. #99 - Jeff Burton
10. #2 - Rusty Wallace

Failed to qualify: #12 - Derrike Cope, #37 - Jeremy Mayfield, #90 - Dick Trickle, #81 - Kenny Wallace, #27 - Ron Barfield Jr., #42 - Kyle Petty

- Terry Labonte finished just two positions behind Jeff Gordon, enough to clinch the 1996 Winston Cup championship by 37 points.
- This was Labonte's second championship, and his first since 1984, twelve years earlier, making this was the longest time span between 1st and 2nd championships for any driver in NASCAR history.
- Ross Perot Jr. was the grand marshal for this race.

=== NASCAR Suzuka Thunder Special ===
The NASCAR Suzuka Thunder Special was a non-points exhibition race ran on November 23 at Suzuka Circuit - East Circuit. Rusty Wallace won the pole. This was the first ever NASCAR race in Japan.

Top ten results

1. #2 - Rusty Wallace
2. #3 - Dale Earnhardt
3. #24 - Jeff Gordon
4. #5 - Terry Labonte
5. #15 - Wally Dallenbach Jr.
6. #30 - Johnny Benson
7. #77 - Bobby Hillin Jr.
8. #31 - Mike Skinner
9. #61 - Rick Carelli
10. #38 - Butch Gilliland
- NASCAR legend Elmo Langley was intended to drive the pace car for this race, but suffered a massive heart attack 2 days prior in the pace car when trying to get familiar with the course. Langley was taken to a nearby hospital, where he later died at the age of 68.

== Results and standings ==
=== Drivers' championship ===
(key) Bold – Pole position awarded by time. Italics – Pole position set by owner's points standings. * – Most laps led.

| Pos. | Driver | DAY | CAR | RCH | ATL | DAR | BRI | NWS | MAR | TAL | SON | CLT | DOV | POC | MCH | DAY | NHA | POC | TAL | IND | GLN | MCH | BRI | DAR | RCH | DOV | MAR | NWS | CLT | CAR | PHO | ATL | Pts |
|---|---|---|---|---|---|---|---|---|---|---|---|---|---|---|---|---|---|---|---|---|---|---|---|---|---|---|---|---|---|---|---|---|---|
| 1 | Terry Labonte | 24^{*} | **34**^{*} | **8** | 2 | 5 | 2 | **1**^{*} | 24 | 4 | **5** | 3 | 2 | 7 | 2 | 2 | 6 | 16 | 24 | 3 | 2 | 3 | 5 | 26 | 5 | 21 | 2 | 5 | 1^{*} | 3 | 3 | 5 | 4657 |
| 2 | Jeff Gordon | 42 | 40 | 1 | 3 | 1^{*} | 1^{*} | 2 | 3^{*} | 33 | 6 | **4** | **1**^{*} | **1**^{*} | 6 | **3** | 34^{*} | 7 | 1 | **37** | 4 | 5 | 2 | 1 | 2^{*} | 1^{*} | 1 | 1^{*} | 31 | 12 | 5 | 3 | 4620 |
| 3 | Dale Jarrett | 1 | 2 | 2 | 11 | 15 | 6 | 11 | 29 | 2 | 12 | 1^{*} | 36 | 38 | 10 | 6 | 2 | 3 | 2 | 1 | 24 | 1 | 4 | **14** | 4 | 3 | 16 | 3 | 3 | **2**^{*} | 8 | 2 | 4568 |
| 4 | Dale Earnhardt | **2** | 1 | 31 | 1^{*} | 14 | 4 | 3 | 5 | 3 | 4 | 2 | 3 | 32 | 9 | 4 | 12 | 14 | 28^{*} | 15 | **6**^{*} | 17 | 24 | 12 | 20 | 16 | 15 | 2 | 6 | 9 | 12 | 4 | 4327 |
| 5 | Mark Martin | 4 | 32 | 5 | 26 | 6 | **3** | 37 | 21 | 34 | 2 | 7 | 40 | 4 | 7 | 11 | 33 | **9**^{*} | 3 | 4 | 3 | 2^{*} | **3** | 3 | **9** | 5 | 9 | 9 | 2 | 7 | 2^{*} | 7 | 4278 |
| 6 | Ricky Rudd | 9 | 4 | 9 | 8 | 9 | 14 | 15 | 23 | 28 | 7 | 15 | 8 | 2 | 31 | 33 | 3 | 2 | 37 | 6 | 34 | 8 | 9 | 16 | 12 | 34 | 35 | 7 | 13 | 1 | 14 | 8 | 3845 |
| 7 | Rusty Wallace | 16 | 22 | 7 | 36 | 4 | 5 | 33 | 1 | 30 | 1^{*} | 34 | 7 | 31 | 1 | 31 | 7 | 1 | 10 | 7 | 33 | 39 | 1^{*} | 38 | 6 | 2 | 36 | 10 | 8 | 8 | 40 | 10 | 3717 |
| 8 | Sterling Marlin | 40 | 6 | 11 | 13 | 11 | 18 | 5 | 10 | 1^{*} | 15 | 6 | 41 | 11 | 3^{*} | 1^{*} | 29 | 6 | 29 | 39 | 11 | 33 | 18 | 8 | 21 | 17 | 31 | 11 | 4 | 13 | 27 | 15 | 3682 |
| 9 | Bobby Hamilton | 20 | 24 | 6^{*} | 16 | 16 | 32 | 8 | 6 | 11 | 17 | 31 | 21 | 5 | **15** | 16 | 20 | 39 | 17 | 31 | 38 | 13 | 10 | 19 | 7 | 10 | **3**^{*} | 8 | 19 | 28 | 1 | 6 | 3639 |
| 10 | Ernie Irvan | 35 | 14 | 38 | 4 | 33 | 16 | 6 | 2 | **31** | 42 | 9 | 4 | 39 | 5 | 5 | 1 | 4 | 4 | 2 | 35 | 4 | 36 | 7 | 1 | 36 | 12 | 36 | 37 | 4 | 7 | 36 | 3632 |
| 11 | Bobby Labonte | 17 | 33 | 23 | 31 | 2 | 7 | 10 | 8 | 24 | 9 | 22 | 5 | 41 | 12 | 40 | 31 | 37 | 8 | 24 | 5 | 6 | 32 | 6 | 11 | **4** | 21 | 13 | **40** | 6 | **9** | **1**^{*} | 3590 |
| 12 | Ken Schrader | 3 | 29 | 14 | 6 | 28 | 29 | 9 | 7 | 20 | 8 | 5 | 10 | 18 | 16 | 8 | 8 | 15 | 26 | 16 | 25 | 15 | 13 | 4 | 13 | 22 | 30 | 18 | 29 | 23 | 35 | 30 | 3540 |
| 13 | Jeff Burton | 5 | 13 | 4 | DNQ | 10 | 23 | 29 | 22 | 16 | 26 | 18 | 9 | 9 | 17 | 14 | 4 | 35 | 7 | 11 | 21 | **9** | 37 | 31 | 3 | 40 | 11 | 4 | 11 | 5 | 31 | 9 | 3538 |
| 14 | Michael Waltrip | 10 | 35 | 36 | 9 | 29 | 10 | 17 | 17 | 5 | 22 | 8 | 11 | 14 | 32 | 7 | 10 | 13 | 42 | 28 | 7 | 25 | 6 | 33 | 14 | 9 | 14 | 12 | 9 | 14 | 16 | 11 | 3535 |
| 15 | Jimmy Spencer | 11 | 27 | 29 | 7 | 32 | 13 | 31 | 19 | 40 | 21 | 17 | 6 | 8 | 4 | 10 | 17 | 24 | 5 | 12 | 19 | 10 | 7 | 23 | 30 | 30 | 19 | 20 | 16 | 10 | 18 | 14 | 3476 |
| 16 | Ted Musgrave | 7 | 31 | 3 | 18 | 7 | 25 | 12 | 9 | 8 | 23 | 30 | 13 | 19 | 8 | 13 | 11 | 19 | 36 | 21 | 12 | 23 | 12 | 29 | 15 | 33 | 20 | **19** | 17 | 18 | 4 | 31 | 3466 |
| 17 | Geoff Bodine | 34 | 39 | 33 | 23 | 22 | 19 | 19 | 27 | 26 | 40 | 10 | 30 | 3 | 21 | 34 | 15 | 11 | 6 | 20 | 1 | 12 | 39 | 21 | 17 | 11 | 7 | 30 | 20 | 15 | 6 | 26 | 3218 |
| 18 | Rick Mast | 28 | 10 | 19 | 34 | 19 | 12 | 14 | 15 | 15 | 19 | 12 | 35 | 28 | 18 | 20 | 13 | 30 | 41 | 9 | 27 | 16 | 35 | 22 | 19 | 6 | 4 | 6 | 15 | 38 | 38 | 13 | 3190 |
| 19 | Morgan Shepherd | 31 | 37 | 32 | 30 | 8 | 30 | 27 | 20 | 43 | 24 | 29 | 32 | 6 | 11 | 15 | 22 | 17 | 14 | 5 | 9 | 11 | 19 | 24 | 23 | 18 | 6 | 14 | 23 | 29 | 17 | 28 | 3133 |
| 20 | Ricky Craven | 13 | 3 | 17 | 12 | 3 | 9 | 7 | **12** | 36 | 31 | 37 | 14 | 17 | 29 | 22 | **26** | 20 | 19 | 34 | 36 | 18 | 21 | 42 | 28 | 35 | 26 | 22 | 5 | 22 | 34 | 35 | 3078 |
| 21 | Johnny Benson **(R)** | 23 | 20 | 37 | **38** | 24 | DNQ | 24 | 25 | 10 | 18 | 38 | 17 | 25 | 37 | 25 | 9 | 5 | 18 | 8^{*} | 15 | 7 | 28 | 11 | 10 | 24 | 17 | 17 | 14 | 40 | 32 | 27 | 3004 |
| 22 | Hut Stricklin | 22 | 30 | 39 | 25 | 20 | 11 | 16 | 31 | 22 | 13 | 28 | 34 | 29 | 27 | 19 | 23 | 32 | 34 | 18 | 37 | 26 | 20 | 2^{*} | 24 | 38 | 25 | 16 | 25 | 11 | 30 | 17 | 2854 |
| 23 | Lake Speed | 14 | 25 | 18 | 41 | 25 | 35 | 35 | 11 | 42 | 16 | 35 | 26 | 34 | 19 | 29 | 24 | 8 | 30 | 13 | 17 | 32 | 16 | 10 | 31 | 13 | 28 | 25 | 12 | 35 | 28 | 19 | 2834 |
| 24 | Brett Bodine | 32 | 28 | 25 | 24 | 27 | 20 | 23 | 18 | 23 | 20 | 24 | 24 | 40 | 22 | 9 | 16 | 27 | 22 | 22 | 14 | 28 | 14 | 28 | 25 | 27 | DNQ | 23 | 28 | 16 | 26 | 21 | 2814 |
| 25 | Wally Dallenbach Jr. | 6 | 23 | 40 | 20 | 37 | 24 | 28 | DNQ | 12 | 3 | 19 | 22 | 12 | 13 | 12 | 18 | 33 | 32 | 17 | 10 | 34 | 25 | 25 | 33 | 29 | 22 | 34 | 33 | 36 | 15 | 40 | 2786 |
| 26 | Jeremy Mayfield | 19 | 19 | 28 | 5 | 18 | 21 | 20 | 4 | 32 | 32 | 41 | 12 | 15 | 30 | 27 | 36 | 12 | **16** | 25 | 22 | 20 | 17 | 37 | 29 | 15 | 34 | 28 | 43 | 34 | 44 | DNQ | 2721 |
| 27 | Kyle Petty | 18 | 11 | 20 | 22 | 12 | 15 | 30 | 30 | 18 | 30 | 23 | 18 | 20 | 38 | 24 | 28 | 26 | 12 | 38 | 23 | | | 17 | 18 | 8 | 8 | 31 | 41 | 25 | 29 | DNQ | 2696 |
| 28 | Kenny Wallace | 21 | 7 | 15 | 37 | 17 | 34 | 18 | 14 | 14 | 27 | 32 | 20 | 37 | 33 | 38 | 19 | 36 | 20 | 33 | 31 | 37 | 15 | 13 | 38 | 20 | 10 | 15 | 30 | 19 | 37 | DNQ | 2694 |
| 29 | Darrell Waltrip | 29 | 16 | 27 | 32 | 34 | 26 | 25 | 16 | 21 | 14 | 13 | 39 | 30 | 25 | 26 | 37 | 40 | 9 | 40 | 18 | 22 | 11 | 32 | 22 | 39 | 23 | 27 | 42 | 21 | 10 | 37 | 2657 |
| 30 | Bill Elliott | 8 | 15 | 10 | 10 | 13 | 28 | 21 | 13 | 41 | | | | | | 37 | 14 | 21 | 13 | 10 | | 14 | INQ^{4} | 9 | 16 | 28 | 18 | 21 | 10 | 32 | 21 | 20 | 2627 |
| 31 | John Andretti | 38 | 38 | 12 | 21 | 40 | DNQ | 34 | 36 | 9 | 11 | 27 | 33 | 16 | 24 | 23 | 40 | 23 | 39 | 19 | 26 | 31 | 38 | 5 | 36 | 14 | 5 | 24 | 39 | 26 | 19 | 24 | 2621 |
| 32 | Robert Pressley | 30 | 26 | 16 | 27 | 36 | 17 | 4 | 34 | 7 | 34 | 33 | | 33 | 23 | 17 | 5 | 25 | 31 | 30 | 30 | 41 | 33 | 27 | 26 | 32 | 32 | 33 | 32 | 37 | 36 | 33 | 2485 |
| 33 | Ward Burton | 26 | 41 | 13 | 15 | **38** | 33 | DNQ | DNQ | 27 | 10 | 11 | 16 | 35 | 35 | 41 | 25 | 22 | 33 | 36 | 32 | 35 | 8 | 40 | 37 | 7 | DNQ | DNQ | 7 | 17 | 22 | 12 | 2411 |
| 34 | Joe Nemechek | 39 | 9 | 34 | 17 | 31 | 31 | 36 | 26 | 13 | 41 | 25 | 25 | 21 | 36 | 18 | 35 | 34 | 15 | 27 | 8 | 27 | 34 | DNQ | 39 | 25 | 27 | 26 | DNQ | 24 | 25 | 34 | 2391 |
| 35 | Derrike Cope | 41 | 8 | 22 | 35 | 39 | 22 | 13 | 28 | 29 | 39 | 14 | 23 | 27 | 40 | 42 | 38 | 10 | 27 | 14 | 16 | 24 | 29 | 34 | 8 | 31 | DNQ | 37 | 18 | 39 | 43 | DNQ | 2374 |
| 36 | Dick Trickle | 43 | DNQ | DNQ | 14 | 35 | 8 | 22 | DNQ | 19 | 29 | 20 | 28 | 26 | 39 | 28 | 27 | 18 | 38 | 23 | 39 | 38 | 26 | 36 | 27 | 23 | 13 | DNQ | 35 | 31 | 20 | DNQ | 2131 |
| 37 | Bobby Hillin Jr. | DNQ | 18 | 26 | 28 | 41 | DNQ | DNQ | DNQ | DNQ | 43 | 26 | 29 | 13 | 14 | 32 | 21 | 38 | 35 | 26 | 29 | 19 | 22 | 18 | 32 | 12 | 24 | 35 | 36 | 33 | 39 | 16 | 2128 |
| 38 | Dave Marcis | 15 | 21 | 35 | 29 | 23 | DNQ | DNQ | 35 | 39 | 33 | 40 | 31 | DNQ | 26 | 36 | 39 | 28 | 11 | 35 | 28 | 40 | 27 | 30 | 34 | 26 | 29 | 29 | DNQ | 30 | 24 | 25 | 2047 |
| 39 | Steve Grissom | 27 | 5 | 21 | 39 | 26 | 27 | 26 | DNQ | 6 | 25 | 16 | 42 | 22 | 34 | | | | | | | | | | | | | | | | | | 1188 |
| 40 | Todd Bodine | | QL^{1} | | | | | | | | | 36 | 15 | 10 | 20 | | | | | | | | | 15 | 35 | | | | 21 | 20 | 11 | 32 | 991 |
| 41 | Mike Wallace | 37 | 17 | 24 | 33 | 21 | DNQ | DNQ | 32 | 38 | 44 | 39 | 19 | | | | | | | | | 29 | | | | | | | | | | | 799 |
| 42 | Greg Sacks | | | | | | | | | | | | 27 | | | 39 | 30 | 29 | 25 | 32 | | 30 | | | | | | | 24 | | | 18 | 710 |
| 43 | Elton Sawyer | 25 | DNQ | 30 | 19 | 30 | 37 | 32 | DNQ | 37 | | 21 | | | | | | | | | | DNQ | | | | | | | | | | 23 | 705 |
| 44 | Chad Little | 33 | | | | | | | | DNQ | DNQ | 43 | | | | | | | DNQ | | | 36 | 23 | 20 | 40 | 41 | DNQ | | 22 | | | 22 | 627 |
| 45 | Loy Allen Jr. | 36 | 36 | | | | | | | | | | | 23 | 28 | 30 | DNQ | | 21 | | | | | 41 | | | | | 34 | | | 39 | 603 |
| 46 | Gary Bradberry | | DNQ | | | | | | | | | | 38 | | | 35 | | | 23 | 29 | | | 30 | 35 | DNQ | 37 | DNQ | DNQ | DNQ | 27 | | 38 | 591 |
| 47 | Mike Skinner | | 12 | | | | 36 | | | 17 | | | | | | | | | | | | | | | | 19 | | | | | 13 | | 529 |
| 48 | Jeff Purvis | 12 | | | | | | | | 35 | | | | | | 21 | | | 40 | DNQ | | | | | | | | | | | | | 328 |
| 49 | Jeff Green | | | | | | | | | | | | | 36 | | | | 41 | | | | | | | | | | 32 | 26 | | | | 247 |
| 50 | Randy MacDonald **(R)** | | DNQ | DNQ | DNQ | DNQ | | DNQ | DNQ | | | DNQ | | 24 | | | 32 | 31 | | DNQ | | | | DNQ | | | | | | | | | 228 |
| 51 | Billy Standridge | | | | | | | | | | | | | | | | | | | | | | | | | | DNQ | | 27 | 41 | | 29 | 198 |
| 52 | Jim Sauter | DNQ | | | | | | | | | | | | | | | | | | | | 21 | 31 | | | | | | | | | | 170 |
| 53 | Chuck Bown | DNQ | | | 40 | DNQ | DNQ | | | 25 | | 42 | | | | | | | | | | | | | | | | | | | | | 168 |
| 54 | Jack Sprague | | | | | | | | | | | | | | | | | | | | | | | | | | | | | | 23 | 42 | 136 |
| 55 | Dorsey Schroeder | | | | | | | | | | | | | | | | | | | | 13 | | | | | | | | | | | | 129 |
| 56 | Stacy Compton **(R)** | | | | | | | | 33 | | | | | | | | | | | DNQ | | | | | DNQ | | 33 | | | | | | 128 |
| 57 | Robby Gordon | | | | | | | | | | | | | | | | | | | | | | | | | | | | 38 | 42 | 42 | | 123 |
| 58 | Butch Leitzinger | | | | | | | | | | | | | | | | | | | | 20 | | | | | | | | | | | | 103 |
| 59 | Jeff Krogh | | | | | | | | | | 35 | | | | | | | | | | | | | | | | | | | | 41 | | 98 |
| 60 | Tommy Kendall | | | | | | | | | | 28 | | | | | | | | | | | | | | | | | | | | | | 84 |
| 61 | Lance Hooper | | | | | | | | | | DNQ | | | | | | | | | | | | | | | | | | | | 33 | | 64 |
| 62 | Larry Gunselman | | | | | | | | | | 36 | | | | | | | | | | | | | | | | | | | | DNQ | | 55 |
| 63 | Rich Woodland Jr. | | | | | | | | | | 37 | | | | | | | | | | | | | | | | | | | | DNQ | | 52 |
| 64 | Hermie Sadler | | | | | | | | | | | DNQ | 37 | | | | | | | | | | | | | | | | | | | | 52 |
| 65 | Scott Gaylord | | | | | | | | | | 38 | | | | | | | | | | | | | | | | | | | | DNQ | | 49 |
| 66 | Ed Berrier | | | | | | | | | | | DNQ | | | | | | | | | | | | 39 | | | | | | DNQ | | | 46 |
| 67 | Randy Baker | | | | | | | | | | | | | | | | | | | | | | | | | | | | | | | 41 | 40 |
| Pos | Driver | DAY | CAR | RCH | ATL | DAR | BRI | NWS | MAR | TAL | SON | CLT | DOV | POC | MCH | DAY | NHA | POC | TAL | IND | GLN | MCH | BRI | DAR | RCH | DOV | MAR | NWS | CLT | CAR | PHO | ATL | Pts |
| | Steve Seligman | DNQ | | | DNQ | | | | | DNQ | | DNQ | | | | DNQ | | | | DNQ | | | | | | | | | | | | | |
| | Tracy Leslie | DNQ | | | | | | | | | | | | | | | | | | | | | | | | | | | | | | | |
| | Delma Cowart | DNQ | | | | | | | | DNQ | | DNQ | | | | | | | | | | | | | | | | | DNQ | | | | |
| | Jim Bown | DNQ | | | | | | | | | | | | | | | | | | | | | | | | | | | | | | | |
| | Joe Ruttman | DNQ | | | | | | | | | | | | | | | | | | | | | | | | | | | | | | | |
| | Robbie Faggart | | | DNQ | | DNQ | | | | | | DNQ | | | | | | | | DNQ | | | | DNQ | | | | | DNQ | | | | |
| | Jimmy Hensley | | | | | DNQ | | | | | | | | | | | | | | | | | | | | | | | | | | | |
| | Phil Barkdoll | | | | | | | | | DNQ | | | | | | | | | | | | | | | | | | | | | | | |
| | Mark Krogh | | | | | | | | | | DNQ | | | | | | | | | | | | | | | | | | | | DNQ | | |
| | Joe Bean | | | | | | | | | | DNQ | | | | | | | | | | | | | | | | | | | | DNQ | | |
| | Wayne Jacks | | | | | | | | | | DNQ | | | | | | | | | | | | | | | | | | | | | | |
| | Bill McAnally | | | | | | | | | | DNQ | | | | | | | | | | | | | | | | | | | | DNQ | | |
| | Mark Gibson | | | | | | | | | | | DNQ | | | | | | | | | | | | | | | | | | | | | |
| | Ron Barfield Jr. | | | | | | | | | | | | | | QL^{3} | | | | | DNQ | | | | | | | | | | | | DNQ | |
| | Jason Keller | | | | | | | | | | | | | | | | | | | DNQ | | | | | | | | | | | | | |
| | A. J. Foyt | | | | | | | | | | | | | | | | | | | DNQ | | | | | | | | | | | | | |
| | Eric Smith | | | | | | | | | | | | | | | | | | | | | | | | | DNQ | | | | | | | |
| | Mike McLaughlin | | | | | | | | | | | | | | | | | | | | DNQ | | | | | | | | | | | | |
| | Ron Hornaday Jr. | | | | | | | | | | | | | | | | | | | | | DNQ | | | | | | | | | | | |
| | Jay Sauter | | | | | | | | | | | | | | | | | | | | | | | DNQ | DNQ | | | | | | | | |
| | Norm Benning | | | | | | | | | | | | | | | | | | | | | | | | | | | | | DNQ | | | |
| | Terry Byers | | | | | | | | | | | | | | | | | | | | | | | | | | | | | DNQ | | | |
| | Dave Rezendes | | | | | | | | | | QL^{2} | | | | | | | | | | | | | | | | | | | | | | |
| Pos | Driver | DAY | CAR | RCH | ATL | DAR | BRI | NWS | MAR | TAL | SON | CLT | DOV | POC | MCH | DAY | NHA | POC | TAL | IND | GLN | MCH | BRI | DAR | RCH | DOV | MAR | NWS | CLT | CAR | PHO | ATL | Pts |
^{1}At Rockingham, Geoff Bodine had his younger brother Todd qualify his No. 7 car, as Geoff Bodine had suffered broken ribs from a crash in the previous race, which was the 1996 Daytona 500.
^{2}Geoff Bodine failed to qualify car No. 07 at Sonoma, but his Craftsman Truck driver Dave Rezendes timed in 23rd in the No. 7. Team owner Geoff Bodine drove the qualified entry, his regular car, in the race.
^{3}Ron Barfield Jr. qualified the No. 94 of the injured Bill Elliott at Michigan for Todd Bodine who was competing in the Busch Series' race at Myrtle Beach.
^{4}Bobby Hillin Jr. failed to qualify his regular ride at Bristol, but filled in for Bill Elliott who was still feeling effects from a crash earlier in the year at Talladega.

=== Owners' championship ===
(key) Bold - Pole position awarded by time. Italics - Pole position set by owner's points standings. * – Most laps led.

| Pos | Car | Owner | Drivers | DAY | CAR | RCH | ATL | DAR | BRI | NWS | MAR | TAL | SON | CLT | DOV | POC | MCH | DAY | NHA | POC | TAL | IND | GLN | MCH | BRI | DAR | RCH | DOV | MAR | NWS | CLT | CAR | PHO | ATL | Points |
|---|---|---|---|---|---|---|---|---|---|---|---|---|---|---|---|---|---|---|---|---|---|---|---|---|---|---|---|---|---|---|---|---|---|---|---|
| 1 | 5 | Hendrick Motorsports | T. Labonte | 24^{*} | **34**^{*} | **8** | 2 | 5 | 2 | **1**^{*} | 24 | 4 | **5** | 3 | 2 | 7 | 2 | 2 | 6 | 16 | 24 | 3 | 2 | 3 | 5 | 26 | 5 | 21 | 2 | 5 | 1^{*} | 3 | 3 | 5 | 4657 |
| 2 | 24 | Hendrick Motorsports | J. Gordon | 42 | 40 | 1 | 3 | 1^{*} | 1^{*} | 2 | 3^{*} | 33 | 6 | **4** | **1**^{*} | **1**^{*} | 6 | **3** | 34^{*} | 7 | 1 | **37** | 4 | 5 | 2 | 1 | 2^{*} | 1^{*} | 1 | 1^{*} | 31 | 12 | 5 | 3 | 4620 |
| 3 | 88 | Robert Yates Racing | Jarrett | 1 | 2 | 2 | 11 | 15 | 6 | 11 | 29 | 2 | 12 | 1^{*} | 36 | 38 | 10 | 6 | 2 | 3 | 2 | 1 | 24 | 1 | 4 | **14** | 4 | 3 | 16 | 3 | 3 | **2**^{*} | 8 | 2 | 4568 |
| 4 | 3 | Richard Childress Racing | Earnhardt | **2** | 1 | 31 | 1^{*} | 14 | 4 | 3 | 5 | 3 | 4 | 2 | 3 | 32 | 9 | 4 | 12 | 14 | 28^{*} | 15 | **6**^{*} | 17 | 24 | 12 | 20 | 16 | 15 | 2 | 6 | 9 | 12 | 4 | 4327 |
| 5 | 6 | Roush Racing | Martin | 4 | 32 | 5 | 26 | 6 | **3** | 37 | 21 | 34 | 2 | 7 | 40 | 4 | 7 | 11 | 33 | **9**^{*} | 3 | 4 | 3 | 2^{*} | **3** | 3 | **9** | 5 | 9 | 9 | 2 | 7 | 2^{*} | 7 | 4278 |
| 6 | 10 | Rudd Performance Motorsports | Rudd | 9 | 4 | 9 | 8 | 9 | 14 | 15 | 23 | 28 | 7 | 15 | 8 | 2 | 31 | 33 | 3 | 2 | 37 | 6 | 34 | 8 | 9 | 16 | 12 | 34 | 35 | 7 | 13 | 1 | 14 | 8 | 3845 |
| 7 | 2 | Penske Racing South | R. Wallace | 16 | 22 | 7 | 36 | 4 | 5 | 33 | 1 | 30 | 1^{*} | 34 | 7 | 31 | 1 | 31 | 7 | 1 | 10 | 7 | 33 | 39 | 1^{*} | 38 | 6 | 2 | 36 | 10 | 8 | 8 | 40 | 10 | 3717 |
| 8 | 4 | Morgan-McClure Motorsports | Marlin | 40 | 6 | 11 | 13 | 11 | 18 | 5 | 10 | 1^{*} | 15 | 6 | 41 | 11 | 3^{*} | 1^{*} | 29 | 6 | 29 | 39 | 11 | 33 | 18 | 8 | 21 | 17 | 31 | 11 | 4 | 13 | 27 | 15 | 3682 |
| 9 | 43 | Petty Enterprises | Hamiliton | 20 | 24 | 6^{*} | 16 | 16 | 32 | 8 | 6 | 11 | 17 | 31 | 21 | 5 | **15** | 16 | 20 | 39 | 17 | 31 | 38 | 13 | 10 | 19 | 7 | 10 | **3**^{*} | 8 | 19 | 28 | 1 | 6 | 3639 |
| 10 | 28 | Robert Yates Racing | Irvan | 35 | 14 | 38 | 4 | 33 | 16 | 6 | 2 | **31** | 42 | 9 | 4 | 39 | 5 | 5 | 1 | 4 | 4 | 2 | 35 | 4 | 36 | 7 | 1 | 36 | 12 | 36 | 37 | 4 | 7 | 36 | 3632 |
| 11 | 18 | Joe Gibbs Racing | B. Labonte | 17 | 33 | 23 | 31 | 2 | 7 | 10 | 8 | 24 | 9 | 22 | 5 | 41 | 12 | 40 | 31 | 37 | 8 | 24 | 5 | 6 | 32 | 6 | 11 | **4** | 21 | 13 | **40** | 6 | **9** | **1**^{*} | 3590 |
| 12 | 99 | Roush Racing | J. Burton | 5 | 13 | 4 | DNQ | 10 | 23 | 29 | 22 | 16 | 26 | 18 | 9 | 9 | 17 | 14 | 4 | 35 | 7 | 11 | 21 | **9** | 37 | 31 | 3 | 40 | 11 | 4 | 11 | 5 | 31 | 9 | 3575 |
| 13 | 25 | Hendrick Motorsports | Schrader | 3 | 29 | 14 | 6 | 28 | 29 | 9 | 7 | 20 | 8 | 5 | 10 | 18 | 16 | 8 | 8 | 15 | 26 | 16 | 25 | 15 | 13 | 4 | 13 | 22 | 30 | 18 | 29 | 23 | 35 | 30 | 3540 |
| 14 | 21 | Wood Brothers Racing | M. Waltrip | 10 | 35 | 36 | 9 | 29 | 10 | 17 | 17 | 5 | 22 | 8 | 11 | 14 | 32 | 7 | 10 | 13 | 42 | 28 | 7 | 25 | 6 | 33 | 14 | 9 | 14 | 12 | 9 | 14 | 16 | 11 | 3535 |
| 15 | 23 | Travis Carter Enterprises | Jimmy Spencer | 11 | 27 | 29 | 7 | 32 | 13 | 31 | 19 | 40 | 21 | 17 | 6 | 8 | 4 | 10 | 17 | 24 | 5 | 12 | 19 | 10 | 7 | 23 | 30 | 30 | 19 | 20 | 16 | 10 | 18 | 14 | 3476 |
| 16 | 16 | Roush Racing | Musgrave | 7 | 31 | 3 | 18 | 7 | 25 | 12 | 9 | 8 | 23 | 30 | 13 | 19 | 8 | 13 | 11 | 19 | 36 | 21 | 12 | 23 | 12 | 29 | 15 | 33 | 20 | **19** | 17 | 18 | 4 | 31 | 3466 |
| 17 | 94 | Elliott-Hardy Racing | Kendall | | | | | | | | | | 28 | | | | | | | | | | | | | | | | | | | | | | 3347 |
| 17 | 94 | Elliott-Hardy Racing | T. Bodine | | | | | | | | | | | 36 | 15 | 10 | 20 | | | | | | | | | | | | | | | | | | 3347 |
| 17 | 94 | Elliott-Hardy Racing | Elliott | 8 | 15 | 10 | 10 | 13 | 28 | 21 | 13 | 41 | | | | | | 37 | 14 | | | | | | | | | | | | | | | | 3347 |
| 17 | 94 | Bill Elliott Racing | Elliott | | | | | | | | | | | | | | | | | 21 | 13 | 10 | | 14 | | 9 | 16 | 28 | 18 | 21 | 10 | 32 | 21 | 20 | 3347 |
| 17 | 94 | Bill Elliott Racing | Schroeder | | | | | | | | | | | | | | | | | | | | 13 | | | | | | | | | | | | 3347 |
| 17 | 94 | Bill Elliott Racing | Hillin Jr. | | | | | | | | | | | | | | | | | | | | | | 22 | | | | | | | | | | 3347 |
| 18 | 7 | Geoff Bodine Racing | G. Bodine | 34 | 39 | 33 | 23 | 22 | 19 | 19 | 27 | 26 | 40 | 10 | 30 | 3 | 21 | 34 | 15 | 11 | 6 | 20 | 1 | 12 | 39 | 21 | 17 | 11 | 7 | 30 | 20 | 15 | 6 | 26 | 3218 |
| 19 | 1 | Precision Products Racing | Mast | 28 | 10 | 19 | 34 | 19 | 12 | 14 | 15 | 15 | 19 | 12 | 35 | 28 | 18 | 20 | 13 | 30 | 41 | 9 | 27 | 16 | 35 | 22 | 19 | 6 | 4 | 6 | 15 | 38 | 38 | 13 | 3190 |
| 20 | 75 | Butch Mock Motorsports | Shepherd | 31 | 37 | 32 | 30 | 8 | 30 | 27 | 20 | 43 | 24 | 29 | 32 | 6 | 11 | 15 | 22 | 17 | 14 | 5 | 9 | 11 | 19 | 24 | 23 | 18 | 6 | 14 | 23 | 29 | 17 | 28 | 3133 |
| 21 | 41 | Larry Hedrick Motorsports | Craven | 13 | 3 | 17 | 12 | 3 | 9 | 7 | **12** | 36 | 31 | 37 | 14 | 17 | 29 | 22 | **26** | 20 | 19 | 34 | 36 | 18 | 21 | 42 | 28 | 35 | 26 | 22 | 5 | 22 | 34 | 35 | 3078 |
| 22 | 30 | Bahari Racing | Benson | 23 | 20 | 37 | **38** | 24 | DNQ | 24 | 25 | 10 | 18 | 38 | 17 | 25 | 37 | 25 | 9 | 5 | 18 | 8^{*} | 15 | 7 | 28 | 11 | 10 | 24 | 17 | 17 | 14 | 40 | 32 | 27 | 3047 |
| 23 | 98 | Cale Yarborough Motorsports | Mayfield | 19 | 19 | 28 | 5 | 18 | 21 | 20 | 4 | 32 | 32 | 41 | 12 | 15 | 30 | 27 | 36 | 12 | **16** | 25 | 22 | 20 | 17 | 37 | | | | | | | | | 3016 |
| 23 | 98 | Cale Yarborough Motorsports | Andretti | | | | | | | | | | | | | | | | | | | | | | | | 36 | 14 | 5 | 24 | 39 | 26 | 19 | 24 | 3016 |
| 24 | 42 | Team SABCO | Petty | 18 | 11 | 20 | 22 | 12 | 15 | 30 | 30 | 18 | 30 | 23 | 18 | 20 | 38 | 24 | 28 | 26 | 12 | 38 | 23 | | | 17 | 18 | 8 | 8 | 31 | 41 | 25 | 29 | DNQ | 2885 |
| 24 | 42 | Team SABCO | Jim Sauter | | | | | | | | | | | | | | | | | | | | | 21 | 31 | | | | | | | | | | 2885 |
| 25 | 11 | Brett Bodine Racing | B. Bodine | 32 | 28 | 25 | 24 | 27 | 20 | 23 | 18 | 23 | 20 | 24 | 24 | 40 | 22 | 9 | 16 | 27 | 22 | 22 | 14 | 28 | 14 | 28 | 25 | 27 | DNQ | 23 | 28 | 16 | 26 | 21 | 2863 |
| 26 | 8 | Stavola Brothers Racing | Stricklin | 22 | 30 | 39 | 25 | 20 | 11 | 16 | 31 | 22 | 13 | 28 | 34 | 29 | 27 | 19 | 23 | 32 | 34 | 18 | 37 | 26 | 20 | 2^{*} | 24 | 38 | 25 | 16 | 25 | 11 | 30 | 17 | 2854 |
| 27 | 9 | Melling Racing | Speed | 14 | 25 | 18 | 41 | 25 | 35 | 35 | 11 | 42 | 16 | 35 | 26 | 34 | 19 | 29 | 24 | 8 | 30 | 13 | 17 | 32 | 16 | 10 | 31 | 13 | 28 | 25 | 12 | 35 | 28 | 19 | 2834 |
| 28 | 15 | Bud Moore Engineering | Dallenbach Jr. | 6 | 23 | 40 | 20 | 37 | 24 | 28 | DNQ | 12 | 3 | 19 | 22 | 12 | 13 | 12 | 18 | 33 | 32 | 17 | 10 | 34 | 25 | 25 | 33 | 29 | 22 | 34 | 33 | 36 | 15 | 40 | 2823 |
| 29 | 81 | FILMAR Racing | K. Wallace | 21 | 7 | 15 | 37 | 17 | 34 | 18 | 14 | 14 | 27 | 32 | 20 | 37 | 33 | 38 | 19 | 36 | 20 | 33 | 31 | 37 | 15 | 13 | 38 | 20 | 10 | 15 | 30 | 19 | 37 | DNQ | 2719 |
| 30 | 33 | Leo Jackson Motorsports | Sacks | | | | | | | | | | | | 27 | | | | | | | | | | | | | | | | | | | | 2696 |
| 30 | 33 | Leo Jackson Motorsports | Pressley | 30 | 26 | 16 | 27 | 36 | 17 | 4 | 34 | 7 | 34 | 33 | | 33 | 23 | 17 | 5 | 25 | 31 | 30 | 30 | 41 | 33 | 27 | 26 | 32 | 32 | 33 | | | | | 2696 |
| 30 | 33 | Andy Petree Racing | Pressley | | | | | | | | | | | | | | | | | | | | | | | | | | | | 32 | | | | 2696 |
| 30 | 33 | Andy Petree Racing | T. Bodine | | | | | | | | | | | | | | | | | | | | | | | | | | | | | 20 | 11 | 32 | 2696 |
| 31 | 17 | Darrell Waltrip Motorsports | D. Waltrip | 29 | 16 | 27 | 32 | 34 | 26 | 25 | 16 | 21 | 14 | 13 | 39 | 30 | 25 | 26 | 37 | 40 | 9 | 40 | 18 | 22 | 11 | 32 | 22 | 39 | 23 | 27 | 42 | 21 | 10 | 37 | 2657 |
| 32 | 22 | Bill Davis Racing | W. Burton | 26 | 41 | 13 | 15 | **38** | 33 | DNQ | DNQ | 27 | 10 | 11 | 16 | 35 | 35 | 41 | 25 | 22 | 33 | 36 | 32 | 35 | 8 | 40 | 37 | 7 | DNQ | DNQ | 7 | 17 | 22 | 12 | 2577 |
| 33 | 12 | Bobby Allison Motorsports | Cope | 41 | 8 | 22 | 35 | 39 | 22 | 13 | 28 | 29 | 39 | 14 | 23 | 27 | 40 | 42 | 38 | 10 | 27 | 14 | 16 | 24 | 29 | 34 | 8 | 31 | DNQ | 37 | 18 | 39 | 43 | DNQ | 2460 |
| 34 | 87 | NEMCO Motorsports | Nemechek | 39 | 9 | 34 | 17 | 31 | 31 | 36 | 26 | 13 | 41 | 25 | 25 | 21 | 36 | 18 | 35 | 34 | 15 | 27 | 8 | 27 | 34 | DNQ | 39 | 25 | 27 | 26 | DNQ | 24 | 25 | 34 | 2453 |
| 35 | 29 | Diamond Ridge Motorsports | Grissom | 27 | 5 | 21 | 39 | 26 | 27 | 26 | DNQ | 6 | 25 | 16 | 42 | 22 | 34 | | | | | | | | | | | | | | | | | | 2414 |
| 35 | 29 | Diamond Ridge Motorsports | Sacks | | | | | | | | | | | | | | | 39 | 30 | 29 | 25 | 32 | | 30 | | | | | | | | | | | 2414 |
| 35 | 29 | Diamond Ridge Motorsports | Leitzinger | | | | | | | | | | | | | | | | | | | | 20 | | | | | | | | | | | | 2414 |
| 35 | 29 | Diamond Ridge Motorsports | Little | | | | | | | | | | | | | | | | | | | | | | 23 | 20 | 40 | 41 | DNQ | | | | | | 2414 |
| 35 | 29 | Diamond Ridge Motorsports | Green | | | | | | | | | | | | | | | | | | | | | | | | | | | 32 | 26 | | | | 2414 |
| 35 | 29 | Diamond Ridge Motorsports | Pressley | | | | | | | | | | | | | | | | | | | | | | | | | | | | | 37 | 36 | 33 | 2414 |
| 36 | 37 | Kranefuss-Haas Racing | Andretti | 38 | 38 | 12 | 21 | 40 | DNQ | 34 | 36 | 9 | 11 | 27 | 33 | 16 | 24 | 23 | 40 | 23 | 39 | 19 | 26 | 31 | 38 | 5 | | | | | | | | | 2403 |
| 36 | 37 | Kranefuss-Haas Racing | Mayfield | | | | | | | | | | | | | | | | | | | | | | | | 29 | 15 | 34 | 28 | 43 | 34 | 44 | DNQ | 2403 |
| 37 | 77 | Jasper Motorsports | Hillin Jr. | DNQ | 18 | 26 | 28 | 41 | DNQ | DNQ | DNQ | DNQ | 43 | 26 | 29 | 13 | 14 | 32 | 21 | 38 | 35 | 26 | 29 | 19 | DNQ | 18 | 32 | 12 | 24 | 35 | 36 | 33 | 39 | 16 | 2238 |
| 38 | 90 | Donlavey Racing | M. Wallace | 37 | 17 | 24 | 33 | 21 | DNQ | DNQ | 32 | 38 | 44 | 39 | 19 | | | | | | | | | | | | | | | | | | | | 2204 |
| 38 | 90 | Donlavey Racing | Trickle | | | | | | | | | | | | | 26 | 39 | 28 | 27 | 18 | 38 | 23 | 39 | 38 | 26 | 36 | 27 | 23 | 13 | DNQ | 35 | 31 | 20 | DNQ | 2204 |
| 39 | 71 | Marcis Auto Racing | Marcis | 15 | 21 | 35 | 29 | 23 | DNQ | DNQ | 35 | 39 | 33 | 40 | 31 | DNQ | 26 | 36 | 39 | 28 | 11 | 35 | 28 | 40 | 27 | 30 | 34 | 26 | 29 | 29 | DNQ | 30 | 24 | 25 | 2198 |
| 40 | 19 | TriStar Motorsports | Allen Jr. | 36 | 36 | | | | | | | | | | | 23 | 28 | 30 | DNQ | | 21 | Wth | | | | 41 | | | | | 34 | | | 39 | 1578 |
| 40 | 19 | TriStar Motorsports | Trickle | | | DNQ | 14 | 35 | 8 | 22 | DNQ | 19 | 29 | 20 | 28 | | | | | | | | | | | | | | | | | | | | 1578 |
| 40 | 19 | TriStar Motorsports | M. Wallace | | | | | | | | | | | | | | | | | | | | | 29 | | | | | | | | | | | 1578 |
| 41 | 27 | David Blair Motorsports | Sawyer | 25 | DNQ | 30 | 19 | 30 | 37 | 32 | DNQ | 37 | | 21 | | | | | | | | | | DNQ | | | | | | | | | | | 1074 |
| 41 | 27 | David Blair Motorsports | Keller | | | | | | | | | | | | | | | | | | | DNQ | | | | | | | | | | | | | 1074 |
| 41 | 27 | David Blair Motorsports | T. Bodine | | | | | | | | | | | | | | | | | | | | | | | 15 | 35 | | | | 21 | | | | 1074 |
| 41 | 27 | David Blair Motorsports | Barfield Jr. | | | | | | | | | | | | | | | | | | | | | | | | | | | | | | | DNQ | 1074 |
| 42 | 95 | Sadler Brothers Racing | C. Bown | DNQ | | | 40 | DNQ | DNQ | | | 25 | | 42 | | | | | | | | | | | | | | | | | | | | | 1000 |
| 42 | 95 | Sadler Brothers Racing | Bradberry | | | | | | | | | | | | 38 | | | 35 | | | 23 | 29 | | | 30 | 35 | DNQ | 37 | DNQ | DNQ | DNQ | 27 | | 38 | 1000 |
| 43 | 78 | Triad Motorsports | MacDonald | | DNQ | DNQ | DNQ | DNQ | | DNQ | DNQ | | | DNQ | | 24 | | | 32 | 31 | | DNQ | | | | DNQ | | | | | | | | | 802 |
| 43 | 78 | Triad Motorsports | Standridge | | | | | | | | | | | | | | | | | | | | | | | | | | DNQ | | 27 | 41 | | 29 | 802 |
| 44 | 31 | Richard Childress Racing | Skinner | | 12 | | | | 36 | | | 17 | | | | | | | | | | | | | | | | 19 | | | | | 13 | | 529 |
| 45 | 97 | Mark Rypien Racing | Little | 33 | | | | | | | | DNQ | | 43 | | | | | | | DNQ | | | 36 | | | | | | | 22 | | | 22 | 400 |
| 46 | 44 | Phoenix Racing | Purvis | 12 | | | | | | | | 35 | | | | | | 21 | | | 40 | DNQ | | | | | | | | | | | | | 359 |
| 47 | 40 | Team Sabco | Sacks | | | | | | | | | | | | | | | | | | | | | | | | | | | | 24 | | | 18 | 339 |
| 47 | 40 | Team Sabco | R. Gordon | | | | | | | | | | | | | | | | | | | | | | | | | | | | | 42 | 42 | | 339 |
| 47 | 40 | Team Sabco | Jay Sauter | | | | | | | | | | | | | | | | | | | | | | | DNQ | DNQ | | | | | | | | 339 |
| 48 | 02 | Miles Motorsports | Faggart | | | DNQ | | DNQ | | | | | | DNQ | | | | | | | | DNQ | | | | DNQ | | | | | DNQ | | | | 199 |
| 48 | 02 | Miles Motorsports | Baker | | | | | | | | | | | | | | | | | | | | | | | | | | | | | | | 41 | 199 |
| 49 | 46 | Monroe Motorsports | Compton | | | | | | | | 33 | | | | | | | | | | | DNQ | | | | | DNQ | | 33 | | | | | | 196 |
| 50 | 14 | Dale Earnhardt, Inc. | Green | | | | | | | | | | | | | 36 | | | | 41 | | | | | | | | | | | | | | | 178 |
| 50 | 14 | Dale Earnhardt, Inc. | Hornaday Jr. | | | | | | | | | | | | | | | | | | | | | DNQ | | | | | | | | | | | 178 |
| 50 | 14 | Dale Earnhardt, Inc. | R. Gordon | | | | | | | | | | | | | | | | | | | | | | | | | | | | 38 | | | | 178 |
| 51 | 52 | Hendrick Motorsports | Sprague | | | | | | | | | | | | | | | | | | | | | | | | | | | | | | 23 | 42 | 136 |
| 52 | 101 | Excel Motorsports | J. Krogh | | | | | | | | | | 35 | | | | | | | | | | | | | | | | | | | | 41 | | 98 |
| 53 | 20 | Ranier-Walsh Racing | Sawyer | | | | | | | | | | | | | | | | | | | | | | | | | | | | | | | 23 | 94 |
| 54 | 63 | Schnell Motorsports | Trickle | 43 | DNQ | | | | | | | | | | | | | | | | | | | | | | | | | | | | | | 90 |
| 54 | 63 | Schnell Motorsports | Berrier | | | | | | | | | | | DNQ | | | | | | | | | | | | | | | | | | | | | 90 |
| 54 | 63 | Schnell Motorsports | M. Wallace | | | | | | | | | | | | | | | | | | | Wth | | | | | | | | | | | | | 90 |
| 55 | 26 | Sadler Racing | Sadler | | | | | | | | | | | DNQ | 37 | | | | | | | | | | | | | | | | | | | | 77 |
| 56 | 137 | Olson Technology Racing | Gunselman | | | | | | | | | | 36 | | | | | | | | | | | | | | | | | | | | DNQ | | 77 |
| 57 | 60 | Berrier Racing | Berrier | | | | | | | | | | | | | | | | | | | | | | | 39 | | | | | | DNQ | | | 74 |
| 58 | 107 | Golden West Motorsports | Hooper | | | | | | | | | | DNQ | | | | | | | | | | | | | | | | | | | | 33 | | 74 |
| 59 | 100 | Oliver Racing | Gaylord | | | | | | | | | | 38 | | | | | | | | | | | | | | | | | | | | DNQ | | 74 |
| 60 | 138 | Woodland Racing | Woodland Jr. | | | | | | | | | | 37 | | | | | | | | | | | | | | | | | | | | DNQ | | 71 |
| Pos | Car | Owner | Drivers | DAY | CAR | RCH | ATL | DAR | BRI | NWS | MAR | TAL | SON | CLT | DOV | POC | MCH | DAY | NHA | POC | TAL | IND | GLN | MCH | BRI | DAR | RCH | DOV | MAR | NWS | CLT | CAR | PHO | ATL | Points |

== Rookie of the Year ==
Johnny Benson was the only rookie to make a full-time run in the 1996 season, making him the 1996 Rookie of the Year. Benson ended the year with one top 5, six top 10s, and one pole. Randy MacDonald and Stacy Compton made attempts at the award as well, but did not run enough times to catch Benson.

== See also ==
- 1996 NASCAR Busch Series
- 1996 NASCAR Craftsman Truck Series
- 1996 NASCAR Winston West Series
