= 1996 Pontiac Excitement 400 =

Third race of the 1996 NASCAR Winston Cup Series

Race details
- Race 3 of 31 in the 1996 NASCAR Winston Cup Series
- The 1996 Pontiac Excitement 400 program cover.
- Date: March 3, 1996
- Official name: 42nd Annual Pontiac Excitement 400
- Location: Richmond, Virginia, Richmond International Raceway
- Course: Permanent racing facility
- Course length: 0.75 miles (1.21 km)
- Distance: 400 laps, 300 mi (482.803 km)
- Scheduled distance: 400 laps, 300 mi (482.803 km)
- Average speed: 102.75 miles per hour (165.36 km/h)

Pole position
Driver	Terry Labonte	Hendrick Motorsports
- Time: 21.822

Most laps led
Driver	Bobby Hamilton	Petty Enterprises
- Laps: 129

Winner
No. 24	Jeff Gordon	Hendrick Motorsports

Television in the United States
- Network: ESPN
- Announcers: Bob Jenkins, Benny Parsons, Ned Jarrett

Radio in the United States
- Radio: Motor Racing Network

The 1996 Pontiac Excitement 400 was the third stock car race of the 1996 NASCAR Winston Cup Series and the 42nd iteration of the event. The race was held on Sunday, March 3, 1996, in Richmond, Virginia, at Richmond International Raceway, a 0.75 miles (1.21 km) D-shaped oval. The race took the scheduled 400 laps to complete. On the final restart with five to go, Hendrick Motorsports driver Jeff Gordon would manage to pull away from the field to secure his 10th career NASCAR Winston Cup Series victory and his first of the season. To fill out the top three, Robert Yates Racing driver Dale Jarrett and Roush Racing driver Ted Musgrave would finish second and third, respectively.

== Background ==
The layout of Richmond International Raceway, the venue where the race was at.

Richmond International Raceway (RIR) is a 3/4-mile (1.2 km), D-shaped, asphalt race track located just outside Richmond, Virginia in Henrico County. It hosts the Monster Energy NASCAR Cup Series and Xfinity Series. Known as "America's premier short track", it formerly hosted a NASCAR Camping World Truck Series race, an IndyCar Series race, and two USAC sprint car races.

=== Entry list ===
- (R) denotes rookie driver.

#	Driver	Team	Make
1	Rick Mast	Precision Products Racing	Pontiac
2	Rusty Wallace	Penske Racing South	Ford
02	Robbie Faggart	Miles Motorsports	Chevrolet
3	Dale Earnhardt	Richard Childress Racing	Chevrolet
4	Sterling Marlin	Morgan–McClure Motorsports	Chevrolet
5	Terry Labonte	Hendrick Motorsports	Chevrolet
6	Mark Martin	Roush Racing	Ford
7	Geoff Bodine	Geoff Bodine Racing	Ford
8	Hut Stricklin	Stavola Brothers Racing	Ford
9	Lake Speed	Melling Racing	Ford
10	Ricky Rudd	Rudd Performance Motorsports	Ford
11	Brett Bodine	Brett Bodine Racing	Ford
12	Derrike Cope	Bobby Allison Motorsports	Ford
15	Wally Dallenbach Jr.	Bud Moore Engineering	Ford
16	Ted Musgrave	Roush Racing	Ford
17	Darrell Waltrip	Darrell Waltrip Motorsports	Chevrolet
18	Bobby Labonte	Joe Gibbs Racing	Chevrolet
19	Dick Trickle	TriStar Motorsports	Ford
21	Michael Waltrip	Wood Brothers Racing	Ford
22	Ward Burton	Bill Davis Racing	Pontiac
23	Jimmy Spencer	Haas-Carter Motorsports	Ford
24	Jeff Gordon	Hendrick Motorsports	Chevrolet
25	Ken Schrader	Hendrick Motorsports	Chevrolet
27	Elton Sawyer	David Blair Motorsports	Ford
28	Ernie Irvan	Robert Yates Racing	Ford
29	Steve Grissom	Diamond Ridge Motorsports	Chevrolet
30	Johnny Benson Jr. (R)	Bahari Racing	Pontiac
33	Robert Pressley	Leo Jackson Motorsports	Chevrolet
37	Jeremy Mayfield	Kranefuss-Haas Racing	Ford
41	Ricky Craven	Larry Hedrick Motorsports	Chevrolet
42	Kyle Petty	Team SABCO	Pontiac
43	Bobby Hamilton	Petty Enterprises	Pontiac
71	Dave Marcis	Marcis Auto Racing	Chevrolet
75	Morgan Shepherd	Butch Mock Motorsports	Ford
77	Bobby Hillin Jr.	Jasper Motorsports	Ford
78	Randy MacDonald	Triad Motorsports	Ford
81	Kenny Wallace	FILMAR Racing	Ford
87	Joe Nemechek	NEMCO Motorsports	Chevrolet
88	Dale Jarrett	Robert Yates Racing	Ford
90	Mike Wallace	Donlavey Racing	Ford
94	Bill Elliott	Bill Elliott Racing	Ford
98	Jeremy Mayfield	Cale Yarborough Motorsports	Ford
99	Jeff Burton	Roush Racing	Ford

== Qualifying ==
Qualifying was split into two rounds. The first round was held on Friday, March 1, at 10:30 AM EST. Each driver would have one lap to set a time. During the first round, the top 25 drivers in the round would be guaranteed a starting spot in the race. If a driver was not able to guarantee a spot in the first round, they had the option to scrub their time from the first round and try and run a faster lap time in a second round qualifying run, held on Saturday, March 2, at 11:30 AM EST. As with the first round, each driver would have one lap to set a time. For this specific race, positions 26-36 would be decided on time, and depending on who needed it, a select amount of positions were given to cars who had not otherwise qualified but were high enough in owner's points.

Terry Labonte, driving for Hendrick Motorsports, would win the pole, setting a time of 21.822 and an average speed of 123.728 miles per hour (199.121 km/h).

Three drivers would fail to qualify: Randy MacDonald, Robbie Faggart, and Dick Trickle.

=== Full qualifying results ===
Pos.	#	Driver	Team	Make	Time	Speed
1	5	Terry Labonte	Hendrick Motorsports	Chevrolet	21.822	123.728
2	24	Jeff Gordon	Hendrick Motorsports	Chevrolet	21.863	123.496
3	43	Bobby Hamilton	Petty Enterprises	Pontiac	21.923	123.158
4	41	Ricky Craven	Larry Hedrick Motorsports	Chevrolet	21.931	123.113
5	6	Mark Martin	Roush Racing	Ford	21.940	123.063
6	94	Bill Elliott	Bill Elliott Racing	Ford	21.941	123.057
7	29	Steve Grissom	Diamond Ridge Motorsports	Chevrolet	21.954	122.984
8	87	Joe Nemechek	NEMCO Motorsports	Chevrolet	21.957	122.968
9	3	Dale Earnhardt	Richard Childress Racing	Chevrolet	21.966	122.917
10	81	Kenny Wallace	FILMAR Racing	Ford	21.970	122.895
11	88	Dale Jarrett	Robert Yates Racing	Ford	21.971	122.889
12	17	Darrell Waltrip	Darrell Waltrip Motorsports	Chevrolet	21.972	122.884
13	25	Ken Schrader	Hendrick Motorsports	Chevrolet	21.977	122.856
14	2	Rusty Wallace	Penske Racing South	Ford	21.981	122.833
15	16	Ted Musgrave	Roush Racing	Ford	22.013	122.655
16	4	Sterling Marlin	Morgan–McClure Motorsports	Chevrolet	22.023	122.599
17	15	Wally Dallenbach Jr.	Bud Moore Engineering	Ford	22.030	122.560
18	1	Rick Mast	Precision Products Racing	Pontiac	22.063	122.377
19	7	Geoff Bodine	Geoff Bodine Racing	Ford	22.112	122.106
20	27	Elton Sawyer	David Blair Motorsports	Ford	22.123	122.045
21	99	Jeff Burton	Roush Racing	Ford	22.127	122.023
22	75	Morgan Shepherd	Butch Mock Motorsports	Ford	22.129	122.012
23	33	Robert Pressley	Leo Jackson Motorsports	Chevrolet	22.137	121.968
24	11	Brett Bodine	Brett Bodine Racing	Ford	22.161	121.836
25	90	Mike Wallace	Donlavey Racing	Ford	22.174	121.764
Failed to lock in Round 1
26	28	Ernie Irvan	Robert Yates Racing	Ford	22.142	121.940
27	12	Derrike Cope	Bobby Allison Motorsports	Ford	22.181	121.726
28	22	Ward Burton	Bill Davis Racing	Pontiac	22.186	121.698
29	98	Jeremy Mayfield	Cale Yarborough Motorsports	Ford	22.186	121.698
30	23	Jimmy Spencer	Travis Carter Enterprises	Ford	22.187	121.693
31	8	Hut Stricklin	Stavola Brothers Racing	Ford	22.209	121.572
32	71	Dave Marcis	Marcis Auto Racing	Chevrolet	22.225	121.485
33	30	Johnny Benson Jr. (R)	Bahari Racing	Pontiac	22.227	121.474
34	10	Ricky Rudd	Rudd Performance Motorsports	Ford	22.229	121.463
35	21	Michael Waltrip	Wood Brothers Racing	Ford	22.233	121.441
36	42	Kyle Petty	Team SABCO	Pontiac	22.257	121.310
Provisionals
37	18	Bobby Labonte	Joe Gibbs Racing	Chevrolet	-*	-*
38	37	John Andretti	Kranefuss-Haas Racing	Ford	-*	-*
39	9	Lake Speed	Melling Racing	Ford	-*	-*
40	77	Bobby Hillin Jr.	Jasper Motorsports	Ford	-*	-*
Failed to qualify
41	78	Randy MacDonald	Triad Motorsports	Ford	-*	-*
42	02	Robbie Faggart	Miles Motorsports	Chevrolet	-*	-*
43	19	Dick Trickle	TriStar Motorsports	Ford	-*	-*
Official first round qualifying results
Official starting lineup

*Time not available.

== Race results ==
Fin	St	#	Driver	Team	Make	Laps	Led	Status	Pts	Winnings
1	2	24	Jeff Gordon	Hendrick Motorsports	Chevrolet	400	124	running	180	$92,400
2	11	88	Dale Jarrett	Robert Yates Racing	Ford	400	23	running	175	$44,225
3	15	16	Ted Musgrave	Roush Racing	Ford	400	0	running	165	$42,200
4	21	99	Jeff Burton	Roush Racing	Ford	400	54	running	165	$22,350
5	5	6	Mark Martin	Roush Racing	Ford	400	0	running	155	$37,850
6	3	43	Bobby Hamilton	Petty Enterprises	Pontiac	400	129	running	160	$37,900
7	14	2	Rusty Wallace	Penske Racing South	Ford	400	26	running	151	$28,375
8	1	5	Terry Labonte	Hendrick Motorsports	Chevrolet	400	3	running	147	$34,475
9	34	10	Ricky Rudd	Rudd Performance Motorsports	Ford	400	0	running	138	$27,875
10	6	94	Bill Elliott	Bill Elliott Racing	Ford	400	26	running	139	$27,225
11	16	4	Sterling Marlin	Morgan–McClure Motorsports	Chevrolet	400	0	running	130	$28,675
12	38	37	John Andretti	Kranefuss-Haas Racing	Ford	400	0	running	127	$25,675
13	28	22	Ward Burton	Bill Davis Racing	Pontiac	400	0	running	124	$26,725
14	13	25	Ken Schrader	Hendrick Motorsports	Chevrolet	399	0	running	121	$22,925
15	10	81	Kenny Wallace	FILMAR Racing	Ford	399	0	running	118	$12,635
16	23	33	Robert Pressley	Leo Jackson Motorsports	Chevrolet	399	1	running	120	$22,570
17	4	41	Ricky Craven	Larry Hedrick Motorsports	Chevrolet	399	0	running	112	$21,870
18	39	9	Lake Speed	Melling Racing	Ford	399	0	running	109	$21,720
19	18	1	Rick Mast	Precision Products Racing	Pontiac	399	0	running	106	$21,495
20	36	42	Kyle Petty	Team SABCO	Pontiac	399	0	running	103	$23,170
21	7	29	Steve Grissom	Diamond Ridge Motorsports	Chevrolet	399	0	running	100	$22,210
22	27	12	Derrike Cope	Bobby Allison Motorsports	Ford	398	0	running	97	$21,085
23	37	18	Bobby Labonte	Joe Gibbs Racing	Chevrolet	398	0	running	94	$26,515
24	25	90	Mike Wallace	Donlavey Racing	Ford	397	0	running	91	$13,890
25	24	11	Brett Bodine	Brett Bodine Racing	Ford	397	0	running	88	$20,940
26	40	77	Bobby Hillin Jr.	Jasper Motorsports	Ford	397	0	running	85	$13,615
27	12	17	Darrell Waltrip	Darrell Waltrip Motorsports	Chevrolet	396	0	running	82	$20,490
28	29	98	Jeremy Mayfield	Cale Yarborough Motorsports	Ford	395	0	running	79	$13,365
29	30	23	Jimmy Spencer	Travis Carter Enterprises	Ford	394	1	running	81	$20,340
30	20	27	Elton Sawyer	David Blair Motorsports	Ford	394	0	running	73	$10,310
31	9	3	Dale Earnhardt	Richard Childress Racing	Chevrolet	393	0	running	70	$27,265
32	22	75	Morgan Shepherd	Butch Mock Motorsports	Ford	392	0	running	67	$12,740
33	19	7	Geoff Bodine	Geoff Bodine Racing	Ford	392	10	running	69	$17,225
34	8	87	Joe Nemechek	NEMCO Motorsports	Chevrolet	391	0	running	61	$17,215
35	32	71	Dave Marcis	Marcis Auto Racing	Chevrolet	391	3	running	63	$10,215
36	35	21	Michael Waltrip	Wood Brothers Racing	Ford	386	0	crash	55	$17,215
37	33	30	Johnny Benson Jr. (R)	Bahari Racing	Pontiac	386	0	running	52	$17,215
38	26	28	Ernie Irvan	Robert Yates Racing	Ford	379	0	overheating	49	$32,715
39	31	8	Hut Stricklin	Stavola Brothers Racing	Ford	288	0	running	46	$10,215
40	17	15	Wally Dallenbach Jr.	Bud Moore Engineering	Ford	19	0	crash	43	$18,215
Failed to qualify
41		78	Randy MacDonald	Triad Motorsports	Ford					
42		02	Robbie Faggart	Miles Motorsports	Chevrolet					
43		19	Dick Trickle	TriStar Motorsports	Ford					
Official race results

Previous race: 1996 Goodwrench Service 400	NASCAR Winston Cup Series; 1996 season	Next race: 1996 Purolator 500
