= Jimmy Fennig =

NASCAR crew chief and former regional racing driver

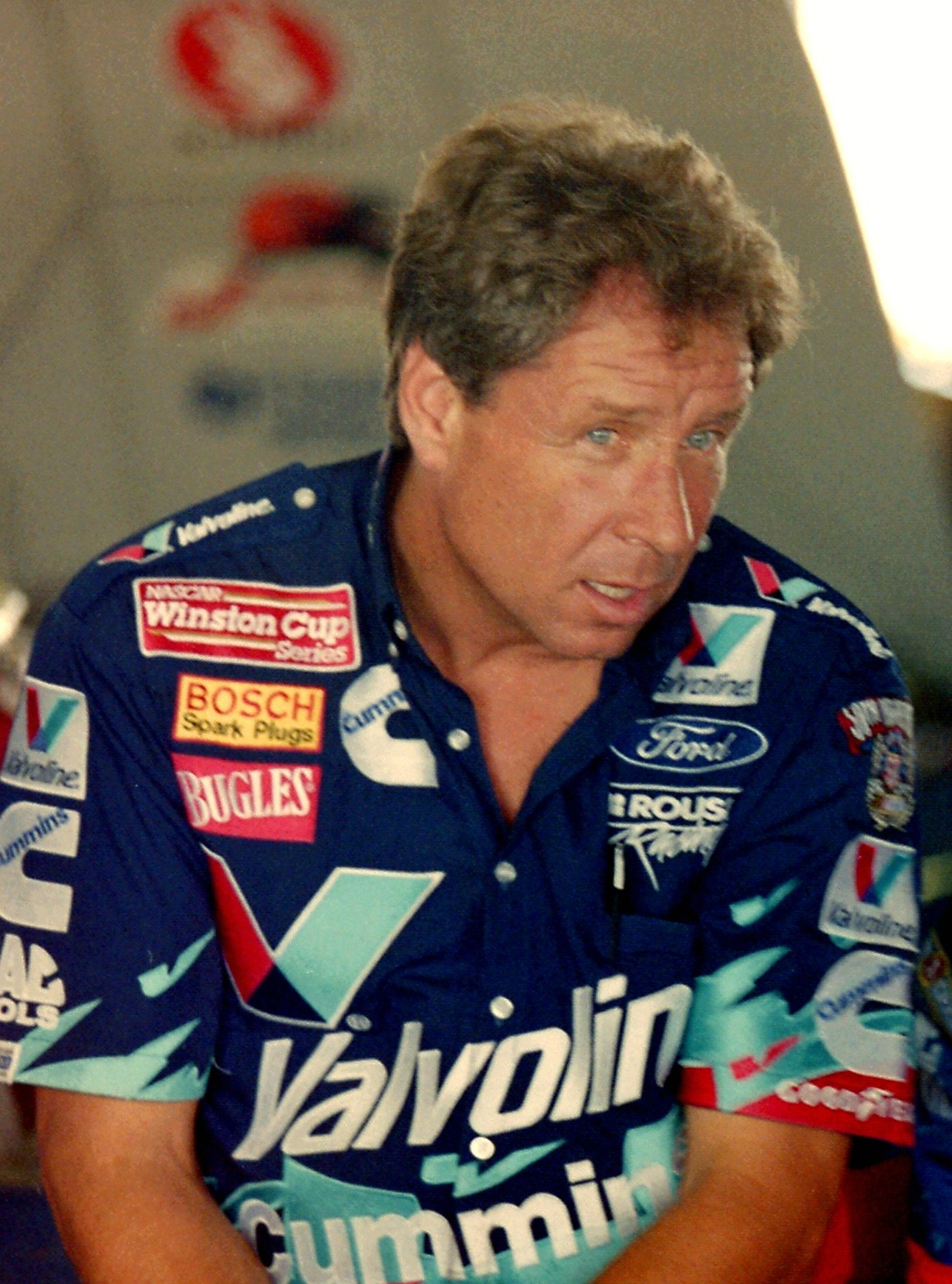
- Fennig in 1998

Personal information
- Nationality: American
- Born: September 15, 1953 (age 73) Milwaukee, Wisconsin, U.S.

Sport
- Country: United States
- Sport: NASCAR

Jimmy Fennig (born September 15, 1953 in Milwaukee, Wisconsin) is a longtime NASCAR crew chief. He was the crew chief for Kurt Busch's 2004 NASCAR Nextel Cup Series' championship. Fennig has collected 40 Cup wins as crew chief.

== Biography ==
Fennig raced asphalt and dirt cars in Wisconsin starting in 1970. He raced as a driver until joining the NASCAR Winston Cup Series in 1984 for DiGard Motorsports. Fennig moved to the American Speed Association (ASA) in 1985 for Mark Martin. In their two seasons together in ASA, the duo had 9 wins, 13 pole positions, and the 1986 championship.

Fennig returned to the Winston Cup Series as the crew chief for Bobby Allison at Stavola Brothers Racing in 1987. Earlier, Fennig had owned a car that Allison raced in Wisconsin and Michigan on Saturday nights. Allison won two races during their two years together, including the 1988 Daytona 500. The following season, he was paired with fellow Wisconsin racer Dick Trickle, who won the 1989 Winston Cup Rookie of the Year award.

Fennig continued to work with then-team owner Bobby Allison until Fennig left the team in October 1996 to join Roush Racing to become Martin's crew chief. Martin/Fennig had 4 wins in 1997, 24 Top 10s, and 3 poles to finish third in the points. Martin finished second in 1998 points with seven victories. They remained together for three more wins, until they went winless in the 2001 Cup season. Jack Roush moved Fennig to the No. 97 crew to be the crew chief for young Kurt Busch in 2002, and Ben Leslie became the crew chief for Mark Martin. The swap was a success as Busch won the NASCAR Nextel Cup Series title in 2004. It was the first year of the Chase for the Cup. Busch dedicated his title to Fennig. Fennig was named the Sporting News crew chief of the year. He continued in that role until 2006. He started out the season as Jamie McMurray's crew chief, and he became the head of Roush Racing Busch Series effort. Fennig became the crew chief for David Ragan after Ragan replaced Martin in the #6 car in 2007, and he remained in that role for 2008.

For the 2013 season, Fennig replaced Chad Norris as crew chief for Carl Edwards. The pair won in their second race together, at Phoenix International Raceway.

Roush talked about Fennig in 2004: "Jimmy Fennig is an unsung hero at Roush Racing. He doesn't do things that create a personal image away from the driver or away from the sponsor or away from the team. He's the trooper that's back there doing everything that he can everyday."

Fennig retired after the 2014 season.
