= 1996 Mountain Dew Southern 500 =

Race details
- Race 23 of 31 in the 1996 NASCAR Winston Cup Series
- 1996 Southern 500 program cover
- Date: September 1, 1996
- Official name: Mountain Dew Southern 500
- Location: Darlington Raceway, Darlington County, South Carolina
- Course: Permanent racing facility
- Course length: 1.366 miles (2.198 km)
- Distance: 367 laps, 501.322 mi (806.800 km)
- Weather: Temperatures reaching up to 86 °F (30 °C); wind speeds up to 10.2 miles per hour (16.4 km/h)
- Average speed: 135.757 miles per hour (218.480 km/h)

Pole position
Driver	Dale Jarrett	Robert Yates Racing

Most laps led
Driver	Hut Stricklin	Stavola Brothers Racing
- Laps: 143

Winner
No. 24	Jeff Gordon	Hendrick Motorsports

Television in the United States
- Network: ESPN
- Announcers: Bob Jenkins, Ned Jarrett and Benny Parsons

The 1996 Mountain Dew Southern 500, the 47th running of the event, was a NASCAR Winston Cup Series race held on September 1, 1996 at Darlington Raceway in Darlington, South Carolina. Contested over 367 laps on the 1.366-mile (2.198-kilometre) speedway, it was the 23rd race of the 1996 NASCAR Winston Cup Series season. Jeff Gordon of Hendrick Motorsports won the race.

== Top 10 results ==
Pos	No.	Driver	Team	Manufacturer
1	24	Jeff Gordon	Hendrick Motorsports	Chevrolet
2	8	Hut Stricklin	Stavola Brothers Racing	Ford
3	6	Mark Martin	Roush Racing	Ford
4	25	Ken Schrader	Hendrick Motorsports	Chevrolet
5	37	John Andretti	Kranefuss-Haas Racing	Ford
6	18	Bobby Labonte	Joe Gibbs Racing	Chevrolet
7	28	Ernie Irvan	Robert Yates Racing	Ford
8	4	Sterling Marlin	Morgan-McClure Motorsports	Chevrolet
9	94	Bill Elliott	Bill Elliott Racing	Ford
10	9	Lake Speed	Melling Racing	Ford

== Race statistics ==
- Time of race: 3:41:34
- Average speed: 135.757 miles per hour (218.480 km/h)
- Pole speed: 170.934 miles per hour (275.092 km/h)
- Cautions: 6 for 37 laps
- Margin of victory: 5.23 seconds
- Lead changes: 29
- Percent of race run under caution: 10.1%
- Average green flag run: 47.1 laps
