= NASCAR Cup Series at Michigan International Speedway =

Auto race held in Michigan, United States

NASCAR Cup Series
- Venue: Michigan International Speedway
- Location: Brooklyn, Michigan, United States

Circuit information
- Surface: Asphalt
- Length: 2.0 mi (3.2 km)
- Turns: 4

Stock car races events in the NASCAR Cup Series have been held annually at Michigan International Speedway in Brooklyn, Michigan since 1969.

A second race at the track was also held until 2020; prior to 2021, the only other season where only one race was held at the track was in 1973.

== Current race ==
FireKeepers Casino 400
- Corporate sponsor: FireKeepers Casino Hotel
- First race: 1969
- Distance: 400 miles (643.738 km)
- Laps: 200 (Stage 1: 45; Stage 2: 75; Final stage: 80)
- Previous names: Motor State 500 (1969); Motor State 400 (1970–1973, 1975); Motor State 360 (1974); Cam 2 Motor Oil 400 (1976–1977); Gabriel 400 (1978–1983); Miller High Life 400 (1984, 1988–1989); Miller 400 (1985, 1996–1997); Miller American 400 (1986–1987); Miller Genuine Draft 400 (1990–1995); Miller Lite 400 (1998); Kmart 400 (1999–2001); Sirius Satellite Radio 400 (2002); Sirius 400 (2003); DHL 400 (2004); Batman Begins 400 (2005); 3M Performance 400 Presented by Post-it Picture Paper (2006); Citizens Bank 400 (2007); LifeLock 400 (2008–2009); Heluva Good! Sour Cream Dips 400 (2010–2011); Quicken Loans 400 (2012–2015)
- Most wins (driver): David Pearson; Kevin Harvick (5)
- Most wins (team): RFK Racing (8)
- Most wins (manufacturer): Ford (24)

The FireKeepers Casino 400 is a NASCAR Cup Series race held annually in the month of June at Michigan International Speedway in Brooklyn, Michigan since 1969. Denny Hamlin is the defending winner of the event, having won it in 2026.

=== Notable races ===
- 1970: Restrictor plates made their racing debut in the 1970 Yankee 400 and Charlie Glotzbach drove a Dodge Daytona to the win.
- 1971: Bobby Allison edged Petty at the stripe for a season sweep at Michigan in the Holman-Moody Mercury.
- 1973: Although the Yankee 400 was on the NASCAR Winston Cup schedule at the beginning of the 1973 season, set for August 5, Roger Penske announced on June 8 that the 1973 Yankee 400 would not be held, citing the tight schedule that Michigan International Speedway had to accommodate in the summer of 1973.
- 1974: Promoter Roger Penske reinserted the Yankee 400 to Michigan's schedule after 1973 after the Michigan 400 that June turned a strong profit. David Pearson and Cale Yarborough fought hard before Cale was stopped by a mismatched set of tires late in the race. The lead changed 45 times among eight drivers.
- 1975: A late yellow-flag set up a five-lap finish; Pearson and Richard Petty went at it and the lead changed on every lap down to the finish as Petty edged Pearson by a nose.
- 1977: Rain postponed the race to Monday and Darrell Waltrip edged Pearson to the stripe.
- 1978: Pearson's final win for the Wood Brothers came on a one-lap shootout as he passed Waltrip. Richard Petty crashed in the final laps, setting up the finish; he was making his debut in a second-hand 1974 bodied Chevrolet after abandoning his 1978 Dodge Magnum.
- 1979: Pearson was hired to drive Rod Osterlund's Chevrolet after Dale Earnhardt was injured at Pocono and he won the Michigan pole, ultimately finishing fourth. Buddy Baker led late but Petty took tires on a late stop and gunned him down on the final lap; the win began a rally from a 229-point deficit to the season championship.
- 1981: The most competitive Michigan race ever erupted as Ron Bouchard won his first pole fresh off his electrifying Talladega win. There were 65 lead changes among 14 drivers and Richard Petty, who led 65 laps, roared from fifth to the lead with five to go and held off six other challengers. "This wasn't the toughest race, but it sure was the most aggravating," Petty said afterward.
- 1987: Fellow drivers revolted against Tim Richmond at Watkins Glen the week before when he reported to the pre race drivers meeting looking sickly and acting belligerently. Before Michigan qualifying Richmond had to be rousted out of his motorhome and when he arrived at the qualifying line asked aloud, "Where are we?" When NASCAR officials Les Richter and Dick Beaty asked Hendrick officials what was wrong with Tim, Richmond appeared from nowhere and confronted both of them, then showed up late for the pre race drivers meeting. During the 400 he had an anxiety attack and the engine blew; he drove to the garage and when the crew checked the tachometer they found it had been pegged, because Richmond had deliberately over revved the engine to blow it. It became his final race ever. Richard Petty rallied to the lead in the final 40 laps but had to pit on a late caution and crashed after colliding with Davey Allison on the final lap as Bill Elliott took the win, his sixth Michigan win in an eight-race span.
- 1991: Dale Jarrett stayed out on a late caution, and in the final laps Davey Allison ran him down, but became locked in a side-by-side battle won by Jarrett by inches for his first win and the first for the Wood Brothers since 1987 at Charlotte.
- 1994: Just after Wally Dallenbach Jr. was released from his seat in Richard Petty's Pontiac, Indycar veteran John Andretti took over the seat and turned heads by qualifying second. However, the story of the weekend was a savage crash in practice that left Ernie Irvan critically injured with head injuries. Irvan would recover from near-fatal injury over a year later. The race itself began with a six-car melee where Bobby Hillin Jr. nearly flew over the second turn wall. Geoff Bodine won on Hoosier Tires.
- 1998: Irvan dominated the race, but Jeff Gordon ran down the leaders and won handily. Mark Martin was denied the win, the race coming days after the death of his father in a plane crash.
- 1999: Goodyear brought tires to Michigan designed for Fontana for Winston West racing, where Hoosier Tire was still a presence in competition against Goodyear; the new tire featured greater stagger and handled more like bias-ply tires than radials. Dale Earnhardt grabbed the lead late and got into a spirited battle with Bobby Labonte before Labonte cleared for the win.
- 2007. This was the first modern-day NASCAR race to be run on a Tuesday. Kurt Busch dominated all day, leading 96 laps out of the 203. Busch held off Martin Truex Jr and Jimmie Johnson in a Green White Checkered finish for his second win of the season.
- 2012: Greg Biffle won his second race of 2012 after Jimmie Johnson's engine blew up with five laps to go. The race was also marked by a scary crash on lap 64. Mark Martin was leading Kasey Kahne into turn 4 and was about to lap Bobby Labonte and Juan Pablo Montoya when Labonte got loose and spun. Montoya got away, but Labonte collected Martin and Kahne. While Labonte and Kahne spun into the trioval grass, Martin's car spun down pit road and was impaled on the left rear side by an opening in the pit wall at Kahne's pit stall. Martin climbed out, unharmed. The day was also a sour day for Hendrick supplied engines as three of the six cars with this engine package - Jeff Gordon, Jimmie Johnson and Tony Stewart - all had engine part failures (Johnson had two failed engines, as he blew another one in practice). The other three, Kasey Kahne, Dale Earnhardt Jr. and Ryan Newman, survived for top ten finishes.
- 2016: This race is memorable for it being the first NASCAR Cup Series victory for Kyle Larson. Chase Elliott would end up finishing second as he did in the prior June race earlier in the year.

=== Past winners ===
Year	Date	No.	Driver	Team	Manufacturer	Race Distance		Race Time	Average Speed (mph)	Report	Ref
Year	Date	No.	Driver	Team	Manufacturer	Laps	Miles (km)	Race Time	Average Speed (mph)	Report	Ref
1969	August 17	17	David Pearson	Holman-Moody	Ford	165*	330 (531.083)	2:51:25	115.508	Report	
1970	August 16	99	Charlie Glotzbach	Ray Nichels	Dodge	197	401.8 (646.737)	2:48:32	147.571	Report	
1971	August 16	12	Bobby Allison	Holman-Moody	Mercury	197	401.88 (646.763)	2:40:54	149.862	Report	
1972	August 20	21	David Pearson	Wood Brothers Racing	Mercury	200	400 (643.737)	2:58:31	134.416	Report	
1973	Not held*										
1974	August 25	21	David Pearson	Wood Brothers Racing	Mercury	200	400 (643.737)	3:00:23	133.045	Report	
1975	August 24	43	Richard Petty	Petty Enterprises	Dodge	200	400 (643.737)	3:43:05	107.583	Report	
1976	August 22	21	David Pearson	Wood Brothers Racing	Mercury	200	400 (643.737)	2:51:20	140.078	Report	
1977	August 22*	88	Darrell Waltrip	DiGard Motorsports	Chevrolet	200	400 (643.737)	2:53:59	137.944	Report	
1978	August 20	21	David Pearson	Wood Brothers Racing	Mercury	200	400 (643.737)	3:05:14	129.566	Report	
1979	August 19	43	Richard Petty	Petty Enterprises	Chevrolet	200	400 (643.737)	3:04:05	130.376	Report	
1980	August 17	11	Cale Yarborough	Junior Johnson & Associates	Chevrolet	200	400 (643.737)	2:45:07	145.352	Report	
1981	August 16	43	Richard Petty	Petty Enterprises	Buick	200	400 (643.737)	3:14:24	123.457	Report	
1982	August 22	88	Bobby Allison	DiGard Motorsports	Buick	200	400 (643.737)	2:45:53	136.454	Report	
1983	August 21	28	Cale Yarborough	Ranier-Lundy	Chevrolet	200	400 (643.737)	2:42:42	147.511	Report	
1984	August 12	11	Darrell Waltrip	Junior Johnson & Associates	Chevrolet	200	400 (643.737)	2:35:59	153.863	Report	
1985	August 11	9	Bill Elliott	Melling Racing	Ford	200	400 (643.737)	2:54:38	137.43	Report	
1986	August 17	9	Bill Elliott	Melling Racing	Ford	200	400 (643.737)	2:57:28	135.376	Report	
1987	August 16	9	Bill Elliott	Melling Racing	Ford	200	400 (643.737)	2:53:06	138.648	Report	
1988	August 21	28	Davey Allison	Ranier-Lundy	Ford	200	400 (643.737)	2:33:00	156.863	Report	
1989	August 20	27	Rusty Wallace	Blue Max Racing	Pontiac	200	400 (643.737)	2:32:11	157.704	Report	
1990	August 19	6	Mark Martin	Roush Racing	Ford	200	400 (643.737)	2:52:53	138.822	Report	
1991	August 18	21	Dale Jarrett	Wood Brothers Racing	Ford	200	400 (643.737)	2:51:34	142.972	Report	
1992	August 16	33	Harry Gant	Leo Jackson Motorsports	Oldsmobile	200	400 (643.737)	2:47:46	146.056	Report	
1993	August 15	6	Mark Martin	Roush Racing	Ford	200	400 (643.737)	2:46:01	144.564	Report	
1994	August 21	7	Geoffrey Bodine	Geoff Bodine Racing	Ford	200	400 (643.737)	2:51:32	139.914	Report	
1995	August 20	18	Bobby Labonte	Joe Gibbs Racing	Chevrolet	200	400 (643.737)	2:32:09	157.739	Report	
1996	August 18	88	Dale Jarrett	Robert Yates Racing	Ford	200	400 (643.737)	2:51:41	139.792	Report	
1997	August 17	6	Mark Martin	Roush Racing	Ford	200	400 (643.737)	3:09:09	126.883	Report	
1998	August 16	24	Jeff Gordon	Hendrick Motorsports	Chevrolet	200	400 (643.737)	2:37:54	151.995	Report	
1999	August 22	18	Bobby Labonte	Joe Gibbs Racing	Pontiac	200	400 (643.737)	2:46:17	144.332	Report	
2000	August 20	2	Rusty Wallace	Penske Racing	Ford	200	400 (643.737)	3:01:00	132.597	Report	
2001	August 19	40	Sterling Marlin	Chip Ganassi Racing	Dodge	162*	324 (521.427)	2:18:21	140.513	Report	
2002	August 18	88	Dale Jarrett	Robert Yates Racing	Ford	200	400 (643.737)	2:50:45	140.556	Report	
2003	August 17	12	Ryan Newman	Penske Racing	Dodge	200	400 (643.737)	3:08:31	127.31	Report	
2004	August 22	16	Greg Biffle	Roush Racing	Ford	200	400 (643.737)	2:52:35	139.063	Report	
2005	August 21	19	Jeremy Mayfield	Evernham Motorsports	Dodge	200	400 (643.737)	2:49:33	141.551	Report	
2006	August 20	17	Matt Kenseth	Roush Racing	Ford	200	400 (643.737)	2:57:39	135.097	Report	
2007	August 21*	2	Kurt Busch	Penske Racing	Dodge	203*	406 (653.393)	2:55:55	117.012	Report	
2008	August 17	99	Carl Edwards	Roush Fenway Racing	Ford	200	400 (643.737)	2:51:00	140.351	Report	
2009	August 16	83	Brian Vickers	Red Bull Racing Team	Toyota	200	400 (643.737)	3:02:28	131.531	Report	
2010	August 15	29	Kevin Harvick	Richard Childress Racing	Chevrolet	200	400 (643.737)	2:46:38	144.029	Report	
2011	August 21	18	Kyle Busch	Joe Gibbs Racing	Toyota	203*	406 (653.393)	2:41:26	150.898	Report	
2012	August 19	16	Greg Biffle	Roush Fenway Racing	Ford	201*	402 (646.956)	2:46:44	144.662	Report	
2013	August 18	22	Joey Logano	Penske Racing	Ford	200	400 (643.737)	2:45:59	144.593	Report	
2014	August 17	24	Jeff Gordon	Hendrick Motorsports	Chevrolet	200	400 (643.737)	2:49:16	141.788	Report	
2015	August 16	20	Matt Kenseth	Joe Gibbs Racing	Toyota	200	400 (643.737)	2:47:18	143.455	Report	
2016	August 28	42	Kyle Larson	Chip Ganassi Racing	Chevrolet	200	400 (643.737)	2:27:29	162.73	Report	
2017	August 13	42	Kyle Larson	Chip Ganassi Racing	Chevrolet	202*	404 (650.174)	2:40:38	150.903	Report	
2018	August 12	4	Kevin Harvick	Stewart–Haas Racing	Ford	200	400 (643.737)	2:50:51	140.474	Report	
2019	August 11	4	Kevin Harvick	Stewart–Haas Racing	Ford	200	400 (643.737)	2:40:59	149.084	Report	
2020	August 9	4	Kevin Harvick	Stewart–Haas Racing	Ford	156	312 (502.008)	2:09:35	144.463	Report	
2021	August 22	12	Ryan Blaney	Team Penske	Ford	200	400 (643.737)	2:48:27	142.476	Report	
2022	August 7	4	Kevin Harvick	Stewart–Haas Racing	Ford	200	400 (643.737)	2:54:08	137.825	Report	
2023	August 6–7*	17	Chris Buescher	RFK Racing	Ford	200	400 (643.737)	3:02:59	131.159	Report	
2024	August 18–19*	45	Tyler Reddick	23XI Racing	Toyota	206*	412 (663.028)	3:02:12	135.675	Report	
2025	June 8	11	Denny Hamlin	Joe Gibbs Racing	Toyota	200	400 (643.737)	2:48:20	142.574	Report	
2026	June 7	11	Denny Hamlin	Joe Gibbs Racing	Toyota	200	400 (643.737)	3:13:39	123.935	Report	
2027	June 20									Report	

==== Notes ====
- 1969, 2001, 2006, 2015, & 2018: Race shortened due to rain.
- 1973: Race cancelled due to the tight schedule the speedway had to accommodate that summer. (Race was supposed to be held on August 5)
- 1974: Race shortened by 10% in response to the fuel crisis.
- 1977: Race postponed from Sunday to Monday due to rain.
- 2000: Race shortened due to rain and darkness.
- 2007: Race postponed twice from Sunday to Tuesday morning due to rain.
- 2007–2008, 2011–2012, 2017, 2019–2020, & 2024: Race extended due to an overtime finish.
- 2020: Race postponed from June 7 to August 8 and shortened to 500 kilometers (312 miles) due to the COVID-19 pandemic and shortened races caused by new rules for two races on the same weekend. However, the race retained the "FireKeepers Casino 400" name.
- 2020: Race shortened by 22% to 500 km (312 mi) due to the COVID-19 pandemic. However, the race retained the "Consumers Energy 400" name.
- 2023–2024: Race started on Sunday afternoon but finished on Monday afternoon due to rain.

==== Multiple winners (drivers) ====
# Wins	Driver	Years won
5	Kevin Harvick	2010, 2018–2020, 2022
5	David Pearson	1969, 1972, 1974, 1976, 1978
3	Richard Petty	1975, 1979, 1981
3	Bill Elliott	1985–1987
3	Mark Martin	1990, 1993, 1997
3	Dale Jarrett	1991, 1996, 2002
2	Bobby Allison	1971, 1982
2	Cale Yarborough	1980, 1983
2	Darrell Waltrip	1977, 1984
2	Bobby Labonte	1995, 1999
2	Rusty Wallace	1989, 2000
2	Greg Biffle	2004, 2012
2	Jeff Gordon	1998, 2014
2	Matt Kenseth	2006, 2015
2	Kyle Larson	2016–2017
2	Denny Hamlin	2025–2026

==== Multiple winners (teams) ====
# Wins	Team	Years won
8	RFK Racing	1990, 1993, 1997, 2004, 2006, 2008, 2012, 2023
6	Joe Gibbs Racing	1995, 1999, 2011, 2015, 2025, 2026
5	Wood Brothers Racing	1972, 1974, 1976, 1978, 1991
5	Team Penske	2000, 2003, 2007, 2013, 2021
4	Stewart–Haas Racing	2018–2020, 2022
3	Petty Enterprises	1975, 1979, 1981
3	Melling Racing	1985–1987
3	Chip Ganassi Racing	2001, 2016–2017
2	Holman-Moody	1969, 1971
2	DiGard Motorsports	1977, 1982
2	Junior Johnson & Associates	1980, 1984
2	Ranier-Lundy	1983, 1988
2	Robert Yates Racing	1996, 2002
2	Hendrick Motorsports	1998, 2014

==== Manufacturer wins ====
# Wins	Manufacturer	Years won
24	Ford	1969, 1985–1988, 1990–1991, 1993–1994, 1996–1997, 2000, 2002, 2004, 2006, 2008, 2012–2013, 2018, 2019–2023
11	Chevrolet	1977, 1979–1980, 1983–1984, 1995, 1998, 2010, 2014, 2016–2017
6	Dodge	1970, 1975, 2001, 2003, 2005, 2007
6	Toyota	2009, 2011, 2015, 2024, 2025, 2026
5	Mercury	1971–1972, 1974, 1976, 1978
2	Buick	1981–1982
2	Pontiac	1989, 1999
1	Oldsmobile	1992

== Former second race ==
Consumers Energy 400
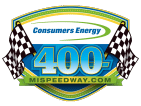
- First race: 1969
- Last race: 2020
- Distance: 312 miles (502.115 km)
- Laps: 156 (Stage 1: 40; Stage 2: 45; Final stage: 71)
- Previous names: Yankee 600 (1969); Yankee 400 (1970–1972, 1974); Champion Spark Plug 400 (1975–1993); GM Goodwrench Dealer 400 (1994–1996); DeVilbiss 400 (1997); Pepsi 400 Presented by DeVilbiss (1998); Pepsi 400 Presented by Meijer (1999–2001); Pepsi 400 Presented by Farmer Jack (2002); GFS Marketplace 400 (2003–2006); 3M Performance 400 (2007); 3M Performance 400 Presented by Bondo (2008); Carfax 400 (2009–2010); Pure Michigan 400 (2011–2017); Consumers Energy 400 (2018–2020)
- Most wins (driver): Cale Yarborough (6)
- Most wins (team): Roush Fenway Racing; Wood Brothers Racing (6)
- Most wins (manufacturer): Ford (20)

The Consumers Energy 400 was a NASCAR Cup Series race held annually in the month of August at Michigan International Speedway in Brooklyn, Michigan since 1969. The race was taken off the schedule following the 2020 season. Kevin Harvick was the final winner of the event, winning it in 2020.

=== Notable races ===
- 1969: NASCAR's debut at Michigan International Speedway was a 500-miler where the lead changed 35 times and writer Benny Phillips wrote afterward, "If they gave an Oscar for NASCAR's most exciting race, it would win hands down." Cale Yarborough escaped to the win when LeeRoy Yarbrough crashed on the final lap.
- 1970: A scoring controversy marred Cale Yarborough's rally to edge Pete Hamilton in a four-lap battle to the flag. Yarborough had lost two laps earlier but was scored on the lead lap at the end; Hamilton's car owner Richard Petty protested, "The (scoring) cards have Cale lapping Pete (on a late caution) without the pace car lapping Pete. That's impossible." Hamilton and Petty led over 100 laps between them in high-winged Plymouth Superbirds.
- 1971: Bobby Allison edged Bobby Isaac by a car length for his third straight win of the season, driving the Holman-Moody Mercury. The lead changed 35 times with Allison, Isaac, and Donnie Allison at times racing three abreast down the mammoth trioval and the lead changing twice on several laps between Bobby Allison and Isaac.
- 1972: David Pearson took the second of his record nine Michigan wins, dominating in the Wood Brothers Mercury; the win was the third for the Woods in the Michigan 400's first four runnings. It was the final season the track was operated under the aegis of the defunct empire of Larry Lopatin, as Roger Penske would purchase the facility in 1973.
- 1974: The rivalry between Richard Petty in the STP Dodge and David Pearson and the Purolator Mercury had begun intensifying in 1973 and reached a new level in 1974 as Petty won the Daytona 500 and Carolina 500 while Pearson had stormed to win the Rebel 450, Winston 500, and World 600. Petty and Pearson faced off with challenges from the Allison brothers, Cale Yarborough, and Buddy Baker, but on this June 1974 day a rookie from Alsa Craig, Ontario, Earl Ross, found himself in the fight as well. A late crash put the race under yellow in the final four laps; Pearson pitted for tires thinking the race would restart but it didn't, as Petty took the win and the Canadian rookie Ross finished second with Pearson third. The lead changed 50 times among nine drivers. Also, this race marked the only Top 5 finish for Marty Robbins.
- 1976: Pearson's superspeedway vengeance tour of 1976 hit Michigan as Cale Yarborough dominated before losing enough power to finish second to the late rally of The Silver Fox, who posted his seventh win of the season.
- 1977: Cale Yarborough took his seventh win of the season over Richard Petty, but was upset after the race over the track surface, which had buckled after a hard winter and caused "my car (to jump) out of gear three times."
- 1979: The lead changed 47 times among eleven drivers and the finish shook into an eight-car battle. In the final laps rookie, Dale Earnhardt hit the apron of Turn Three trying a pass and nearly crashed into Neil Bonnett, Petty, and Darrell Waltrip; both Waltrip and Petty were pointedly critical of Earnhardt ("He nearly took us all out," Waltrip said afterward). Waltrip's blown transmission in the final two laps secured the win for Buddy Baker.
- 1980: Benny Parsons, raised in Detroit, took the win at the speedway in his home state.
- 1981: Another eight-car battle exploded with five to go when Kyle Petty blew his engine in Turn Two as the leaders were entering One; Bobby Allison was running seventh when five of the top seven spun in the oil, then down the backstretch, Darrell Waltrip and Dale Earnhardt collided and crashed. The win was Allison's fourth of the 1981 season and the race turned out to be the final one for car owner Rod Osterlund as he sold his team to mysterious J.D. Stacy.
- 1982:Televised live on CBS, the race completed 56 laps before rain delayed resumption until late in the evening. Cale Yarborough setup Darrell Waltrip for a last-lap pass on the backstretch, with Waltrip, aggressively blocking and making contact. Yarborough made the pass and won, while Waltrip tried to make contact with Cale after the checkered, but thought better of it and spun into the turn 1 infield. An agitated Waltrip gave a very blunt interview to CBS pit announcer Larry Nuber for the late-night race summary, as the live telecast was abandoned after the rain delay. Helped by the very late mid-June sunset in Michigan, it is probably the latest a NASCAR Cup race ever concluded (about 9:15 pm EDT) at a track without night lighting.
- 1984: Cale Yarborough's bid for a ninth Michigan win faltered and Bill Elliott ran away from Dale Earnhardt for his first Michigan win and first win on an oval.
- 1986: Elliott posted a third straight Michigan 400 win, edging Harry Gant, who was competing despite injuries sustained at Pocono the week earlier.
- 1987: Dale Earnhardt took the win as Tim Richmond finished fourth, what would be the final top-five of Richmond's career.
- 1989: Rusty Wallace dominated but on a late pitstop Barry Dodson missed the peg under the door for the jack to be secured; the lengthy stop dropped Wallace too far back to challenge Bill Elliott, who took his fourth Michigan 400 win. Darrell Waltrip led late but "I had too high a gear and it was killing me off the corners."
- 1990: Bill Elliott's blown engine opened the door to a late duel between Dale Earnhardt and fiery upstart Ernie Irvan, who finished 1–2; Irvan was driving Oldsmobiles for Morgan–McClure Motorsports and before the race, it was revealed that Chevrolet would provide the team with factory backing.
- 1991: Only one caution flew as the first half of the race erupted into a ferocious multicar duel. Geoff Bodine and car owner Junior Johnson returned to action after Johnson was suspended for several races, but the primary battle was between Earnhardt, Davey Allison, Mark Martin, and upstart Hut Stricklin, driving for Davey's dad Bobby; the foursome fought it out after a Lap 35 caution and the lead changed over 30 times officially and otherwise, with Earnhardt, in particular, blasting his car into the corners two full seconds deeper than anyone else and the draft kicking into striking effect for Michigan. Past halfway the race shook into a caution-free breeze home for Allison and Stricklin and a satisfying day for Bobby Allison.
- 1994: A slow stop put Rusty Wallace, in his first year in a Ford, well behind Dale Earnhardt, but Wallace handily clawed his way forward and stormed to his third straight win of the season.
- 1995: Chevrolet's controversial Monte Carlo dominated as Jeff Gordon was bested by Bobby Labonte; Labonte Joe Gibbs Racing Chevy ran Hendrick Motorsports engines, a fact that irked primary Hendrick driver Gordon afterward and led to plans by Gibbs to hire Mark Cronquist to organise its own engine programme that started from 1997 to 2010.
- 1997: Ernie Irvan, two months removed from a controversial weekend and bad crash at Texas Motor Speedway, ran away for the Michigan win, his lone win of the season, final win for Robert Yates, and only career win at the track where he was gravely injured three years earlier.
- 1999: For the first and only time at Michigan, the race goes caution-free.
- 2001: Jeff Gordon out-dueled Ricky Rudd to score the 100th win for car owner Rick Hendrick.
- 2008: On Father's Day and hanging around in 5th conserving fuel, Dale Earnhardt Jr. pulled off the biggest upset of the year by winning at Michigan for the first time and snapping a 76 race winless streak (his father won 76 races) and scored his first points race win with car owner Rick Hendrick in the 88 car. At the time it was Chevrolet's first win at Michigan since Jeff Gordon won there in June 2001.
- 2012: First race on the new surface. Four years and two days after scoring his first win with Hendrick Motorsports, Dale Earnhardt Jr. snapped a 143 race winless streak by leading 95 of the 200 laps to score the win for the second time on Father's Day. His last win also came at Michigan on Father's Day in 2008. The race was delayed for two hours because of rain.
- 2014: Jimmie Johnson won his first Michigan race after a streak of bad luck that included engine failures and poor fuel strategy.
- 2015: Kurt Busch, driving in a back-up car, was declared the winner after the race was called for rain after 138 laps. The first 50 laps had seen three red flags resulting from persistent rain.
- 2017: Martin Truex Jr. led for most of the race but after a late-race debris caution, Kyle Larson bested him on the restart to win the race. It would be Larson's 2nd of 3 wins in a row at Michigan.
- 2019: Due to rain and FS1's broadcasts of World Cup games in France on Monday, the race started at 5 pm EDT with more than three and a half hours before sunset. Despite the fact it started late, darkness was never a factor. Joey Logano led a Michigan-record 163 of the 203 laps in a green-white-checkered finish, holding off Kurt Busch.

=== Past winners ===
Year	Date	No.	Driver	Team	Manufacturer	Race distance		Race time	Average speed (mph)	Report	Ref
Year	Date	No.	Driver	Team	Manufacturer	Laps	Miles (km)	Race time	Average speed (mph)	Report	Ref
1969	June 15	21	Cale Yarborough	Wood Brothers Racing	Mercury	250	500 (804.672)	3:35:26	139.254	Report	
1970	June 7	21	Cale Yarborough	Wood Brothers Racing	Mercury	200	400 (643.737)	2:53:02	138.302	Report	
1971	June 13	12	Bobby Allison	Holman-Moody	Mercury	197	401.88 (646.763)	2:41:13	149.567	Report	
1972	June 11	21	David Pearson	Wood Brothers Racing	Mercury	200	400 (643.737)	2:43:40	146.639	Report	
1973	June 24	21	David Pearson	Wood Brothers Racing	Mercury	200	400 (643.737)	2:36:22	153.485	Report	
1974	June 16	43	Richard Petty	Petty Enterprises	Dodge	180*	360 (579.363)	2:48:46	127.098	Report	
1975	June 15	21	David Pearson	Wood Brothers Racing	Mercury	200	400 (643.737)	3:02:39	131.398	Report	
1976	June 20	21	David Pearson	Wood Brothers Racing	Mercury	200	400 (643.737)	2:50:02	141.148	Report	
1977	June 19	11	Cale Yarborough	Junior Johnson & Associates	Chevrolet	200	400 (643.737)	2:57:44	135.033	Report	
1978	June 18	11	Cale Yarborough	Junior Johnson & Associates	Oldsmobile	200	400 (643.737)	2:40:28	149.563	Report	
1979	June 17	28	Buddy Baker	Ranier-Lundy	Chevrolet	200	400 (643.737)	2:56:44	135.798	Report	
1980	June 15	27	Benny Parsons	M.C. Anderson Racing	Chevrolet	200	400 (643.737)	3:02:05	131.808	Report	
1981	June 21	28	Bobby Allison	Ranier-Lundy	Buick	200	400 (643.737)	3:03:47	130.589	Report	
1982	June 20	27	Cale Yarborough	M.C. Anderson Racing	Buick	200	400 (643.737)	3:23:13	118.101	Report	
1983	June 19	28	Cale Yarborough	Ranier-Lundy	Chevrolet	200	400 (643.737)	2:53:00	138.728	Report	
1984	June 17	9	Bill Elliott	Melling Racing	Ford	200	400 (643.737)	2:58:10	134.705	Report	
1985	June 16	9	Bill Elliott	Melling Racing	Ford	200	400 (643.737)	2:45:48	144.724	Report	
1986	June 15	9	Bill Elliott	Melling Racing	Ford	200	400 (643.737)	2:53:21	138.851	Report	
1987	June 28	3	Dale Earnhardt	Richard Childress Racing	Chevrolet	200	400 (643.737)	2:41:40	148.454	Report	
1988	June 26	27	Rusty Wallace	Blue Max Racing	Pontiac	200	400 (643.737)	2:36:18	153.551	Report	
1989	June 25	9	Bill Elliott	Melling Racing	Ford	200	400 (643.737)	2:52:38	139.023	Report	
1990	June 24	3	Dale Earnhardt	Richard Childress Racing	Chevrolet	200	400 (643.737)	2:39:46	150.219	Report	
1991	June 23	28	Davey Allison	Robert Yates Racing	Ford	200	400 (643.737)	2:29:09	160.912	Report	
1992	June 21	28	Davey Allison	Robert Yates Racing	Ford	200	400 (643.737)	2:37:12	152.672	Report	
1993	June 20	5	Ricky Rudd	Hendrick Motorsports	Chevrolet	200	400 (643.737)	2:41:38	148.484	Report	
1994	June 19	2	Rusty Wallace	Penske Racing	Ford	200	400 (643.737)	3:11:58	125.022	Report	
1995	June 18	18	Bobby Labonte	Joe Gibbs Racing	Chevrolet	200	400 (643.737)	2:58:58	134.141	Report	
1996	June 23	2	Rusty Wallace	Penske Racing	Ford	200	400 (643.737)	2:24:23	166.033	Report	
1997	June 15	28	Ernie Irvan	Robert Yates Racing	Ford	200	400 (643.737)	2:36:31	153.338	Report	
1998	June 14	6	Mark Martin	Roush Racing	Ford	200	400 (643.737)	2:31:14	158.695	Report	
1999	June 13	88	Dale Jarrett	Robert Yates Racing	Ford	200	400 (643.737)	2:17:56	173.997	Report	
2000	June 11	20	Tony Stewart	Joe Gibbs Racing	Pontiac	194*	388 (624.425)	2:41:45	143.926	Report	
2001	June 10	24	Jeff Gordon	Hendrick Motorsports	Chevrolet	200	400 (643.737)	2:58:50	134.203	Report	
2002	June 16	17	Matt Kenseth	Roush Racing	Ford	200	400 (643.737)	2:35:01	154.822	Report	
2003	June 15	97	Kurt Busch	Roush Racing	Ford	200	400 (643.737)	3:02:54	131.219	Report	
2004	June 20	12	Ryan Newman	Penske Racing	Dodge	200	400 (643.737)	2:52:18	139.292	Report	
2005	June 19	16	Greg Biffle	Roush Racing	Ford	200	400 (643.737)	2:39:22	150.596	Report	
2006	June 18	9	Kasey Kahne	Evernham Motorsports	Dodge	129*	258 (415.21)	2:10:19	118.788	Report	
2007	June 17	99	Carl Edwards	Roush Fenway Racing	Ford	200	400 (643.737)	2:42:05	148.07	Report	
2008	June 15	88	Dale Earnhardt Jr.	Hendrick Motorsports	Chevrolet	203*	406 (653.393)	2:47:34	145.375	Report	
2009	June 14	5	Mark Martin	Hendrick Motorsports	Chevrolet	200	400 (643.737)	2:34:21	155.491	Report	
2010	June 13	11	Denny Hamlin	Joe Gibbs Racing	Toyota	200	400 (643.737)	2:33:28	156.386	Report	
2011	June 19	11	Denny Hamlin	Joe Gibbs Racing	Toyota	200	400 (643.737)	2:36:50	153.029	Report	
2012	June 17	88	Dale Earnhardt Jr.	Hendrick Motorsports	Chevrolet	200	400 (643.737)	2:52:29	139.144	Report	
2013	June 16	16	Greg Biffle	Roush Fenway Racing	Ford	200	400 (643.737)	2:52:19	139.278	Report	
2014	June 15	48	Jimmie Johnson	Hendrick Motorsports	Chevrolet	200	400 (643.737)	2:47:19	143.441	Report	
2015*	June 14	41	Kurt Busch	Stewart–Haas Racing	Chevrolet	138*	276 (444.179)	2:21:55	116.688	Report	
2016	June 12	22	Joey Logano	Team Penske	Ford	200	400 (643.737)	2:58:47	134.241	Report	
2017	June 18	42	Kyle Larson	Chip Ganassi Racing	Chevrolet	200	400 (643.737)	2:47:24	143.369	Report	
2018	June 10	14	Clint Bowyer	Stewart–Haas Racing	Ford	133*	266 (428.085)	2:00:15	132.723	Report	
2019	June 10*	22	Joey Logano	Team Penske	Ford	203*	406 (653.393)	2:52:50	140.945	Report	
2020	August 8	4	Kevin Harvick	Stewart–Haas Racing	Ford	161*	322 (518.208)	2:34:55	124.712	Report	

==== Multiple winners (drivers) ====
# Wins	Driver	Years won
6	Cale Yarborough	1969–1970, 1977–1978, 1982–1983
4	David Pearson	1972–1973, 1975–1976
4	Bill Elliott	1984–1986, 1989
3	Rusty Wallace	1988, 1994, 1996
2	Bobby Allison	1971, 1981
2	Dale Earnhardt	1987, 1990
2	Mark Martin	1998, 2009
2	Denny Hamlin	2010–2011
2	Dale Earnhardt Jr.	2008, 2012
2	Greg Biffle	2005, 2013
2	Kurt Busch	2003, 2015
2	Joey Logano	2016, 2019

==== Multiple winners (teams) ====
# Wins	Team	Years won
6	RFK Racing	1998, 2002–2003, 2005, 2007, 2013
6	Wood Brothers Racing	1969–1970, 1972–1973, 1975–1976
6	Hendrick Motorsports	1993, 2001, 2008–2009, 2012, 2014
5	Team Penske	1994, 1996, 2004, 2016, 2019
4	Melling Racing	1984–1986, 1989
4	Robert Yates Racing	1991–1992, 1997, 1999
4	Joe Gibbs Racing	1995, 2000, 2010–2011
3	Ranier-Lundy	1979, 1981, 1983
3	Stewart–Haas Racing	2015, 2018, 2020
2	Junior Johnson & Associates	1977–1978
2	M.C. Anderson Racing	1980, 1982
2	Richard Childress Racing	1987, 1990

==== Manufacturer wins ====
# Wins	Manufacturer	Years won
20	Ford	1984–1986, 1989, 1991–1992, 1994, 1996–1999, 2002–2003, 2005, 2007, 2013, 2016, 2018–2020
15	Chevrolet	1977, 1979–1980, 1983, 1987, 1990, 1993, 1995, 2001, 2008–2009, 2012, 2014–2015, 2017
7	Mercury	1969–1973, 1975–1976
3	Dodge	1974, 2004, 2006
2	Buick	1981–1982
2	Pontiac	1988, 2000
2	Toyota	2010–2011
1	Oldsmobile	1978

Previous race: The Great American Getaway 400	NASCAR Cup Series; FireKeepers Casino 400	Next race: eero 400
