= 1996 GM Goodwrench Dealer 400 =

21st race of the 1996 NASCAR Winston Cup Series

Race details
- Race 21 of 31 in the 1996 NASCAR Winston Cup Series
- The 1996 GM Goodwrench Dealer 400 program cover, featuring Dale Earnhardt.
- Date: August 18, 1996
- Official name: 27th Annual GM Goodwrench Dealer 400
- Location: Cambridge Township, Michigan, Michigan International Speedway
- Course: Permanent racing facility
- Course length: 2 miles (3.2 km)
- Distance: 200 laps, 400 mi (643.737 km)
- Average speed: 139.792 miles per hour (224.973 km/h)

Pole position
Driver	Jeff Burton	Roush Racing
- Time: 38.836

Most laps led
Driver	Mark Martin	Roush Racing
- Laps: 135

Winner
No. 88	Dale Jarrett	Robert Yates Racing

Television in the United States
- Network: ESPN
- Announcers: Bob Jenkins, Ned Jarrett, Benny Parsons

Radio in the United States
- Radio: Motor Racing Network

The 1996 GM Goodwrench Dealer 400 was the 21st stock car race of the 1996 NASCAR Winston Cup Series and the 27th iteration of the event. The race was held on Sunday, August 18, 1996, in Cambridge Township, Michigan, at Michigan International Speedway, a two-mile (3.2 km) moderate-banked D-shaped speedway. The race took the scheduled 200 laps to complete. In the final laps of the race, Robert Yates Racing driver Dale Jarrett would engage in a battle with Roush Racing driver Mark Martin, eventually passing Martin with seven laps to go and holding Martin off to come victorious in the race. The race was Jarrett's eighth career NASCAR Winston Cup Series victory and his fourth and final victory of the season. To fill out the podium, the aforementioned Mark Martin and Hendrick Motorsports driver Terry Labonte would finish second and third, respectively.

== Background ==
The layout of Michigan International Speedway, the venue where the race was held.

The race was held at Michigan International Speedway, a two-mile (3.2 km) moderate-banked D-shaped speedway located in Cambridge Township, Michigan. The track is used primarily for NASCAR events. The track is owned by International Speedway Corporation. MIS is recognized as one of motorsports' premier facilities because of its wide racing surface and high banking (by open-wheel standards; the 18-degree banking is modest by stock car standards).

=== Entry list ===
- (R) denotes rookie driver.

#	Driver	Team	Make
1	Rick Mast	Precision Products Racing	Pontiac
2	Rusty Wallace	Penske Racing South	Ford
3	Dale Earnhardt	Richard Childress Racing	Chevrolet
4	Sterling Marlin	Morgan–McClure Motorsports	Chevrolet
5	Terry Labonte	Hendrick Motorsports	Chevrolet
6	Mark Martin	Roush Racing	Ford
7	Geoff Bodine	Geoff Bodine Racing	Ford
8	Hut Stricklin	Stavola Brothers Racing	Ford
9	Lake Speed	Melling Racing	Ford
10	Ricky Rudd	Rudd Performance Motorsports	Ford
11	Brett Bodine	Brett Bodine Racing	Ford
12	Derrike Cope	Bobby Allison Motorsports	Ford
14	Ron Hornaday Jr.	Dale Earnhardt, Inc.	Chevrolet
15	Wally Dallenbach Jr.	Bud Moore Engineering	Ford
16	Ted Musgrave	Roush Racing	Ford
17	Darrell Waltrip	Darrell Waltrip Motorsports	Chevrolet
18	Bobby Labonte	Joe Gibbs Racing	Chevrolet
19	Loy Allen Jr.	TriStar Motorsports	Ford
21	Michael Waltrip	Wood Brothers Racing	Ford
22	Ward Burton	Bill Davis Racing	Pontiac
23	Jimmy Spencer	Haas-Carter Motorsports	Ford
24	Jeff Gordon	Hendrick Motorsports	Chevrolet
25	Ken Schrader	Hendrick Motorsports	Chevrolet
27	Elton Sawyer	David Blair Motorsports	Ford
28	Ernie Irvan	Robert Yates Racing	Ford
29	Greg Sacks	Diamond Ridge Motorsports	Chevrolet
30	Johnny Benson Jr. (R)	Bahari Racing	Pontiac
33	Robert Pressley	Leo Jackson Motorsports	Chevrolet
37	Jeremy Mayfield	Kranefuss-Haas Racing	Ford
41	Ricky Craven	Larry Hedrick Motorsports	Chevrolet
42	Jim Sauter	Team SABCO	Pontiac
43	Bobby Hamilton	Petty Enterprises	Pontiac
71	Dave Marcis	Marcis Auto Racing	Chevrolet
75	Morgan Shepherd	Butch Mock Motorsports	Ford
77	Bobby Hillin Jr.	Jasper Motorsports	Ford
81	Kenny Wallace	FILMAR Racing	Ford
87	Joe Nemechek	NEMCO Motorsports	Chevrolet
88	Dale Jarrett	Robert Yates Racing	Ford
90	Dick Trickle	Donlavey Racing	Ford
94	Bill Elliott	Bill Elliott Racing	Ford
97	Chad Little	Mark Rypien Motorsports	Pontiac
98	Jeremy Mayfield	Cale Yarborough Motorsports	Ford
99	Jeff Burton	Roush Racing	Ford

== Qualifying ==
Qualifying was split into two rounds. The first round was held on Friday, August 16, at 3:00 PM EST. Each driver would have one lap to set a time. During the first round, the top 25 drivers in the round would be guaranteed a starting spot in the race. If a driver was not able to guarantee a spot in the first round, they had the option to scrub their time from the first round and try and run a faster lap time in a second round qualifying run, held on Saturday, August 17, at 10:30 AM EST. As with the first round, each driver would have one lap to set a time. For this specific race, positions 26-36 would be decided on time, and depending on who needed it, a select amount of positions were given to cars who had not otherwise qualified but were high enough in owner's points.

Jeff Burton, driving for Roush Racing, would win the pole, setting a time of 38.836 and an average speed of 185.395 miles per hour (298.364 km/h).

Two drivers would fail to qualify: Elton Sawyer and Ron Hornaday Jr.

=== Full qualifying results ===
Pos.	#	Driver	Team	Make	Time	Speed
1	99	Jeff Burton	Roush Racing	Ford	38.836	185.395
2	18	Bobby Labonte	Joe Gibbs Racing	Chevrolet	38.871	185.228
3	6	Mark Martin	Roush Racing	Ford	38.873	185.219
4	90	Dick Trickle	Donlavey Racing	Ford	38.890	185.138
5	43	Bobby Hamilton	Petty Enterprises	Pontiac	39.044	184.407
6	4	Sterling Marlin	Morgan–McClure Motorsports	Chevrolet	39.047	184.393
7	24	Jeff Gordon	Hendrick Motorsports	Chevrolet	39.097	184.157
8	17	Darrell Waltrip	Darrell Waltrip Motorsports	Chevrolet	39.162	183.852
9	9	Lake Speed	Melling Racing	Ford	39.166	183.833
10	21	Michael Waltrip	Wood Brothers Racing	Ford	39.188	183.730
11	88	Dale Jarrett	Robert Yates Racing	Ford	39.201	183.669
12	28	Ernie Irvan	Robert Yates Racing	Ford	39.211	183.622
13	81	Kenny Wallace	FILMAR Racing	Ford	39.259	183.397
14	77	Bobby Hillin Jr.	Jasper Motorsports	Ford	39.276	183.318
15	37	John Andretti	Kranefuss-Haas Racing	Ford	39.277	183.313
16	3	Dale Earnhardt	Richard Childress Racing	Chevrolet	39.291	183.248
17	87	Joe Nemechek	NEMCO Motorsports	Chevrolet	39.306	183.178
18	25	Ken Schrader	Hendrick Motorsports	Chevrolet	39.359	182.931
19	30	Johnny Benson Jr. (R)	Bahari Racing	Pontiac	39.387	182.801
20	2	Rusty Wallace	Penske Racing South	Ford	39.391	182.783
21	94	Bill Elliott	Bill Elliott Racing	Ford	39.392	182.778
22	5	Terry Labonte	Hendrick Motorsports	Chevrolet	39.402	182.732
23	10	Ricky Rudd	Rudd Performance Motorsports	Ford	39.426	182.621
24	22	Ward Burton	Bill Davis Racing	Pontiac	39.437	182.570
25	15	Wally Dallenbach Jr.	Bud Moore Engineering	Ford	39.456	182.482
26	23	Jimmy Spencer	Travis Carter Enterprises	Ford	39.347	182.987
27	12	Derrike Cope	Bobby Allison Motorsports	Ford	39.421	182.644
28	75	Morgan Shepherd	Butch Mock Motorsports	Ford	39.442	182.547
29	7	Geoff Bodine	Geoff Bodine Racing	Ford	39.469	182.422
30	42	Jim Sauter	Team SABCO	Pontiac	39.487	182.338
31	11	Brett Bodine	Brett Bodine Racing	Ford	39.498	182.288
32	1	Rick Mast	Precision Products Racing	Pontiac	39.521	182.182
33	8	Hut Stricklin	Stavola Brothers Racing	Ford	39.524	181.168
34	16	Ted Musgrave	Roush Racing	Ford	39.541	182.089
35	97	Chad Little	Mark Rypien Motorsports	Pontiac	39.575	181.933
36	33	Robert Pressley	Leo Jackson Motorsports	Chevrolet	39.602	181.809
37	71	Dave Marcis	Marcis Auto Racing	Chevrolet	39.642	181.626
38	41	Ricky Craven	Larry Hedrick Motorsports	Chevrolet	39.753	181.118
Provisionals
39	98	Jeremy Mayfield	Cale Yarborough Motorsports	Ford	-*	-*
40	29	Greg Sacks	Diamond Ridge Motorsports	Chevrolet	-*	-*
41	19	Mike Wallace	TriStar Motorsports	Ford	-*	-*
Failed to qualify
42	27	Elton Sawyer	David Blair Motorsports	Ford	-*	-*
43	14	Ron Hornaday Jr.	Dale Earnhardt, Inc.	Chevrolet	-*	-*
Official first round qualifying results
Official starting lineup

== Race results ==
Fin	St	#	Driver	Team	Make	Laps	Led	Status	Pts	Winnings
1	11	88	Dale Jarrett	Robert Yates Racing	Ford	200	8	running	180	$83,195
2	3	6	Mark Martin	Roush Racing	Ford	200	135	running	180	$79,170
3	22	5	Terry Labonte	Hendrick Motorsports	Chevrolet	200	3	running	170	$57,120
4	12	28	Ernie Irvan	Robert Yates Racing	Ford	200	0	running	160	$43,770
5	7	24	Jeff Gordon	Hendrick Motorsports	Chevrolet	200	0	running	155	$44,040
6	2	18	Bobby Labonte	Joe Gibbs Racing	Chevrolet	200	38	running	155	$41,240
7	19	30	Johnny Benson Jr. (R)	Bahari Racing	Pontiac	200	0	running	146	$35,515
8	23	10	Ricky Rudd	Rudd Performance Motorsports	Ford	200	6	running	147	$35,465
9	1	99	Jeff Burton	Roush Racing	Ford	200	0	running	138	$25,215
10	26	23	Jimmy Spencer	Travis Carter Enterprises	Ford	200	0	running	134	$36,865
11	28	75	Morgan Shepherd	Butch Mock Motorsports	Ford	200	0	running	130	$22,665
12	29	7	Geoff Bodine	Geoff Bodine Racing	Ford	200	0	running	127	$32,765
13	5	43	Bobby Hamilton	Petty Enterprises	Pontiac	200	0	running	124	$28,765
14	21	94	Bill Elliott	Bill Elliott Racing	Ford	200	0	running	121	$28,265
15	18	25	Ken Schrader	Hendrick Motorsports	Chevrolet	200	0	running	118	$28,915
16	32	1	Rick Mast	Precision Products Racing	Pontiac	200	0	running	115	$27,215
17	16	3	Dale Earnhardt	Richard Childress Racing	Chevrolet	200	0	running	112	$32,865
18	38	41	Ricky Craven	Larry Hedrick Motorsports	Chevrolet	200	0	running	109	$29,165
19	14	77	Bobby Hillin Jr.	Jasper Motorsports	Ford	200	0	running	106	$19,265
20	39	98	Jeremy Mayfield	Cale Yarborough Motorsports	Ford	200	0	running	103	$20,765
21	30	42	Jim Sauter	Team SABCO	Pontiac	200	0	running	100	$25,640
22	8	17	Darrell Waltrip	Darrell Waltrip Motorsports	Chevrolet	200	1	running	102	$25,440
23	34	16	Ted Musgrave	Roush Racing	Ford	200	0	running	94	$25,215
24	27	12	Derrike Cope	Bobby Allison Motorsports	Ford	199	0	running	91	$25,015
25	10	21	Michael Waltrip	Wood Brothers Racing	Ford	199	0	running	88	$19,565
26	33	8	Hut Stricklin	Stavola Brothers Racing	Ford	199	0	running	85	$17,465
27	17	87	Joe Nemechek	NEMCO Motorsports	Chevrolet	199	0	running	82	$24,315
28	31	11	Brett Bodine	Brett Bodine Racing	Ford	199	0	running	79	$24,265
29	41	19	Mike Wallace	TriStar Motorsports	Ford	199	0	running	76	$16,665
30	40	29	Greg Sacks	Diamond Ridge Motorsports	Chevrolet	199	0	running	73	$21,115
31	15	37	John Andretti	Kranefuss-Haas Racing	Ford	176	0	crash	70	$20,940
32	9	9	Lake Speed	Melling Racing	Ford	169	7	crash	72	$21,890
33	6	4	Sterling Marlin	Morgan–McClure Motorsports	Chevrolet	167	0	crash	64	$30,440
34	25	15	Wally Dallenbach Jr.	Bud Moore Engineering	Ford	155	0	ignition	61	$20,790
35	24	22	Ward Burton	Bill Davis Racing	Pontiac	149	0	fuel pump	58	$28,740
36	35	97	Chad Little	Mark Rypien Motorsports	Pontiac	111	0	running	55	$13,715
37	13	81	Kenny Wallace	FILMAR Racing	Ford	84	0	crash	52	$13,690
38	4	90	Dick Trickle	Donlavey Racing	Ford	81	2	engine	54	$13,740
39	20	2	Rusty Wallace	Penske Racing South	Ford	77	0	engine	46	$28,615
40	37	71	Dave Marcis	Marcis Auto Racing	Chevrolet	35	0	engine	43	$13,615
41	36	33	Robert Pressley	Leo Jackson Motorsports	Chevrolet	5	0	crash	40	$20,615
Official race results

Previous race: 1996 The Bud at The Glen	NASCAR Winston Cup Series; 1996 season	Next race: 1996 Goody's Headache Powder 500 (Bristol)
