= 2000 goracing.com 500 =

23rd race of the 2000 NASCAR Winston Cup Series

Race details
- Race 23 of 34 in the 2000 NASCAR Winston Cup Series
- The 2000 goracing.com 500 program cover.
- Date: August 26, 2000
- Official name: 40th Annual goracing.com 500
- Location: Bristol, Tennessee, Bristol Motor Speedway
- Course: Permanent racing facility
- Course length: 0.533 miles (0.858 km)
- Distance: 500 laps, 266.5 mi (428.89 km)
- Average speed: 85.394 miles per hour (137.428 km/h)

Pole position
Driver	Rusty Wallace	Penske-Kranefuss Racing
- Time: 15.292

Most laps led
Driver	Rusty Wallace	Penske-Kranefuss Racing
- Laps: 279

Winner
No. 2	Rusty Wallace	Penske-Kranefuss Racing

Television in the United States
- Network: ESPN
- Announcers: Jerry Punch, Ned Jarrett, Benny Parsons

Radio in the United States
- Radio: Performance Racing Network

The 2000 goracing.com 500 was the 23rd stock car race of the 2000 NASCAR Winston Cup Series and the 40th iteration of the event. The race was held on Saturday, August 26, 2000, Bristol, Tennessee at Bristol Motor Speedway, a 0.533 miles (0.858 km) permanent oval-shaped racetrack. The race took the scheduled 500 laps to complete. At race's end, Rusty Wallace, driving for Penske-Kranefuss Racing would manage to take the lead on the final restart with 40 to go to win his 53rd career NASCAR Winston Cup Series win and his fourth and final win of the season. To fill out the podium, Tony Stewart of Joe Gibbs Racing and Mark Martin of Roush Racing would finish second and third, respectively.

== Background ==
The layout of Bristol Motor Speedway, the venue where the race was held.

The Bristol Motor Speedway, formerly known as Bristol International Raceway and Bristol Raceway, is a NASCAR short track venue located in Bristol, Tennessee. Constructed in 1960, it held its first NASCAR race on July 30, 1961. Despite its short length, Bristol is among the most popular tracks on the NASCAR schedule because of its distinct features, which include extraordinarily steep banking, an all concrete surface, two pit roads, and stadium-like seating. It has also been named one of the loudest NASCAR tracks.

=== Entry list ===
- (R) denotes rookie driver.

#	Driver	Team	Make
1	Steve Park	Dale Earnhardt, Inc.	Chevrolet
01	Ted Musgrave	Team SABCO	Chevrolet
2	Rusty Wallace	Penske-Kranefuss Racing	Ford
3	Dale Earnhardt	Richard Childress Racing	Chevrolet
4	Bobby Hamilton	Morgan–McClure Motorsports	Chevrolet
5	Terry Labonte	Hendrick Motorsports	Chevrolet
6	Mark Martin	Roush Racing	Ford
7	Michael Waltrip	Mattei Motorsports	Chevrolet
8	Dale Earnhardt Jr. (R)	Dale Earnhardt, Inc.	Chevrolet
9	Bobby Hillin Jr.	Melling Racing	Ford
10	Johnny Benson Jr.	Tyler Jet Motorsports	Pontiac
11	Brett Bodine	Brett Bodine Racing	Ford
12	Jeremy Mayfield	Penske-Kranefuss Racing	Ford
13	Robby Gordon	Team Menard	Ford
14	Rick Mast	A. J. Foyt Enterprises	Pontiac
16	Kevin Lepage	Roush Racing	Ford
17	Matt Kenseth (R)	Roush Racing	Ford
18	Bobby Labonte	Joe Gibbs Racing	Pontiac
20	Tony Stewart	Joe Gibbs Racing	Pontiac
21	Elliott Sadler	Wood Brothers Racing	Ford
22	Ward Burton	Bill Davis Racing	Pontiac
24	Jeff Gordon	Hendrick Motorsports	Chevrolet
25	Jerry Nadeau	Hendrick Motorsports	Chevrolet
26	Jimmy Spencer	Haas-Carter Motorsports	Ford
27	Mike Bliss (R)	Eel River Racing	Pontiac
28	Ricky Rudd	Robert Yates Racing	Ford
31	Mike Skinner	Richard Childress Racing	Chevrolet
32	Scott Pruett (R)	PPI Motorsports	Ford
33	Joe Nemechek	Andy Petree Racing	Chevrolet
36	Ken Schrader	MB2 Motorsports	Pontiac
40	Sterling Marlin	Team SABCO	Chevrolet
43	John Andretti	Petty Enterprises	Pontiac
44	Kyle Petty	Petty Enterprises	Pontiac
50	Ricky Craven	Midwest Transit Racing	Chevrolet
55	Kenny Wallace	Andy Petree Racing	Chevrolet
60	Geoff Bodine	Joe Bessey Racing	Chevrolet
66	Darrell Waltrip	Haas-Carter Motorsports	Ford
71	Dave Marcis	Marcis Auto Racing	Chevrolet
75	Wally Dallenbach Jr.	Galaxy Motorsports	Ford
77	Robert Pressley	Jasper Motorsports	Ford
85	Carl Long	Mansion Motorsports	Ford
88	Dale Jarrett	Robert Yates Racing	Ford
90	Hut Stricklin	Donlavey Racing	Ford
93	Dave Blaney (R)	Bill Davis Racing	Pontiac
94	David Green	Bill Elliott Racing	Ford
97	Chad Little	Roush Racing	Ford
99	Jeff Burton	Roush Racing	Ford
Official entry list

== Practice ==
=== First practice ===
The first practice session was held on Friday, August 25, at 12:45 PM EST. The session would last for two hours and 45 minutes. Sterling Marlin of Team SABCO would set the fastest time in the session, with a lap of 15.332 and an average speed of 125.150 mph (201.409 km/h).

Pos.	#	Driver	Team	Make	Time	Speed
1	40	Sterling Marlin	Team SABCO	Chevrolet	15.332	125.150
2	2	Rusty Wallace	Penske-Kranefuss Racing	Ford	15.336	125.117
3	20	Tony Stewart (R)	Joe Gibbs Racing	Pontiac	15.407	124.540
Full first practice results

=== Second practice ===
The second practice session was held on Saturday, August 26, at 11:30 AM EST. The session would last for one hour and 30 minutes. Geoff Bodine of Joe Bessey Racing would set the fastest time in the session, with a lap of 15.771 and an average speed of 121.666 mph (195.802 km/h).

Pos.	#	Driver	Team	Make	Time	Speed
1	60	Geoff Bodine	Joe Bessey Racing	Chevrolet	15.771	121.666
2	50	Ricky Craven	Midwest Transit Racing	Chevrolet	15.798	121.458
3	27	Mike Bliss (R)	Eel River Racing	Pontiac	15.847	121.082
Full second practice results

=== Third and final practice ===
The final practice session, sometimes referred to as Happy Hour, was held on Saturday, August 26, at 2:15 PM EST. The session would last for one hour. Kenny Wallace of Andy Petree Racing would set the fastest time in the session, with a lap of 15.989 and an average speed of 120.008 mph (193.134 km/h).

Pos.	#	Driver	Team	Make	Time	Speed
1	55	Kenny Wallace	Andy Petree Racing	Chevrolet	15.989	120.008
2	6	Mark Martin	Roush Racing	Ford	15.991	119.992
3	22	Ward Burton	Bill Davis Racing	Pontiac	15.998	119.940
Full Happy Hour practice results

== Qualifying ==
Qualifying was split into two rounds. The first round was held on Friday, August 25, at 5:00 PM EST. Each driver would have two laps to set a fastest time; the fastest of the two would count as their official qualifying lap. During the first round, the top 25 drivers in the round would be guaranteed a starting spot in the race. If a driver was not able to guarantee a spot in the first round, they had the option to scrub their time from the first round and try and run a faster lap time in a second round qualifying run, held on Saturday, August 26, at 1:45 PM EST. As with the first round, each driver would have two laps to set a fastest time; the fastest of the two would count as their official qualifying lap. Positions 26-36 would be decided on time, while positions 37-43 would be based on provisionals. Six spots are awarded by the use of provisionals based on owner's points. The seventh is awarded to a past champion who has not otherwise qualified for the race. If no past champion needs the provisional, the next team in the owner points will be awarded a provisional.

Rusty Wallace of Penske-Kranefuss Racing would win the pole, setting a time of 15.292 and an average speed of 125.477 miles per hour (201.936 km/h).

Four drivers would fail to qualify: Mike Bliss, Hut Stricklin, Carl Long, and Ricky Craven.

=== Full qualifying results ===
Pos.	#	Driver	Team	Make	Time	Speed
1	2	Rusty Wallace	Penske-Kranefuss Racing	Ford	15.292	125.477
2	24	Jeff Gordon	Hendrick Motorsports	Chevrolet	15.293	125.469
3	1	Steve Park	Dale Earnhardt, Inc.	Chevrolet	15.298	125.428
4	31	Mike Skinner	Richard Childress Racing	Chevrolet	15.329	125.175
5	25	Jerry Nadeau	Hendrick Motorsports	Chevrolet	15.337	125.109
6	20	Tony Stewart (R)	Joe Gibbs Racing	Pontiac	15.359	124.930
7	6	Mark Martin	Roush Racing	Ford	15.367	124.865
8	40	Sterling Marlin	Team SABCO	Chevrolet	15.375	124.800
9	77	Robert Pressley	Jasper Motorsports	Ford	15.387	124.703
10	16	Kevin Lepage	Roush Racing	Ford	15.420	124.436
11	21	Elliott Sadler	Wood Brothers Racing	Ford	15.420	124.436
12	8	Dale Earnhardt Jr. (R)	Dale Earnhardt, Inc.	Chevrolet	15.422	124.420
13	13	Robby Gordon	Team Menard	Ford	15.428	124.371
14	11	Brett Bodine	Brett Bodine Racing	Ford	15.433	124.331
15	36	Ken Schrader	MB2 Motorsports	Pontiac	15.436	124.307
16	22	Ward Burton	Bill Davis Racing	Pontiac	15.437	124.299
17	3	Dale Earnhardt	Richard Childress Racing	Chevrolet	15.440	124.275
18	12	Jeremy Mayfield	Penske-Kranefuss Racing	Ford	15.452	124.178
19	7	Michael Waltrip	Mattei Motorsports	Chevrolet	15.453	124.170
20	4	Bobby Hamilton	Morgan–McClure Motorsports	Chevrolet	15.454	124.162
21	9	Bobby Hillin Jr.	Melling Racing	Ford	15.466	124.066
22	17	Matt Kenseth (R)	Roush Racing	Ford	15.486	123.905
23	5	Terry Labonte	Hendrick Motorsports	Chevrolet	15.491	123.865
24	55	Kenny Wallace	Andy Petree Racing	Chevrolet	15.499	123.802
25	44	Kyle Petty	Petty Enterprises	Pontiac	15.499	123.802
26	94	David Green	Bill Elliott Racing	Ford	15.501	123.786
27	66	Darrell Waltrip	Haas-Carter Motorsports	Ford	15.502	123.778
28	43	John Andretti	Petty Enterprises	Pontiac	15.509	123.722
29	10	Johnny Benson Jr.	Tyler Jet Motorsports	Pontiac	15.517	123.658
30	93	Dave Blaney (R)	Bill Davis Racing	Pontiac	15.528	123.570
31	88	Dale Jarrett	Robert Yates Racing	Ford	15.531	123.546
32	18	Bobby Labonte	Joe Gibbs Racing	Pontiac	15.535	123.515
33	32	Scott Pruett (R)	PPI Motorsports	Ford	15.542	123.459
34	33	Joe Nemechek	Andy Petree Racing	Chevrolet	15.546	123.427
35	99	Jeff Burton	Roush Racing	Ford	15.553	123.372
36	60	Geoff Bodine	Joe Bessey Racing	Chevrolet	15.565	123.277
Provisionals
37	28	Ricky Rudd	Robert Yates Racing	Ford	15.594	123.047
38	97	Chad Little	Roush Racing	Ford	15.727	122.007
39	26	Jimmy Spencer	Haas-Carter Motorsports	Ford	15.763	121.728
40	01	Ted Musgrave	Team SABCO	Chevrolet	15.671	122.443
41	75	Wally Dallenbach Jr.	Galaxy Motorsports	Ford	-	-
42	14	Rick Mast	A. J. Foyt Enterprises	Pontiac	15.648	122.623
43	71	Dave Marcis	Marcis Auto Racing	Chevrolet	15.724	122.030
Failed to qualify
44	27	Mike Bliss (R)	Eel River Racing	Pontiac	15.630	122.764
45	90	Hut Stricklin	Donlavey Racing	Ford	15.772	121.659
46	85	Carl Long	Mansion Motorsports	Ford	15.865	120.945
47	50	Ricky Craven	Midwest Transit Racing	Chevrolet	15.981	120.068
Official first round qualifying results
Official starting lineup

== Race results ==
Fin	St	#	Driver	Team	Make	Laps	Led	Status	Pts	Winnings
1	1	2	Rusty Wallace	Penske-Kranefuss Racing	Ford	500	279	running	185	$107,540
2	6	20	Tony Stewart (R)	Joe Gibbs Racing	Pontiac	500	133	running	175	$92,540
3	7	6	Mark Martin	Roush Racing	Ford	500	46	running	170	$61,890
4	17	3	Dale Earnhardt	Richard Childress Racing	Chevrolet	500	2	running	165	$62,980
5	3	1	Steve Park	Dale Earnhardt, Inc.	Chevrolet	500	0	running	155	$53,525
6	35	99	Jeff Burton	Roush Racing	Ford	500	2	running	155	$61,615
7	11	21	Elliott Sadler	Wood Brothers Racing	Ford	500	1	running	151	$49,540
8	8	40	Sterling Marlin	Team SABCO	Chevrolet	500	6	running	147	$48,040
9	31	88	Dale Jarrett	Robert Yates Racing	Ford	500	1	running	143	$56,715
10	37	28	Ricky Rudd	Robert Yates Racing	Ford	500	0	running	134	$55,765
11	16	22	Ward Burton	Bill Davis Racing	Pontiac	499	21	running	135	$48,990
12	15	36	Ken Schrader	MB2 Motorsports	Pontiac	499	0	running	127	$33,890
13	29	10	Johnny Benson Jr.	Tyler Jet Motorsports	Pontiac	499	0	running	124	$33,640
14	4	31	Mike Skinner	Richard Childress Racing	Chevrolet	499	0	running	121	$41,890
15	32	18	Bobby Labonte	Joe Gibbs Racing	Pontiac	499	2	running	123	$51,835
16	23	5	Terry Labonte	Hendrick Motorsports	Chevrolet	499	0	running	115	$46,835
17	40	01	Ted Musgrave	Team SABCO	Chevrolet	499	0	running	112	$41,985
18	10	16	Kevin Lepage	Roush Racing	Ford	499	2	running	114	$40,525
19	19	7	Michael Waltrip	Mattei Motorsports	Chevrolet	499	0	running	106	$40,900
20	28	43	John Andretti	Petty Enterprises	Pontiac	499	0	running	103	$48,560
21	12	8	Dale Earnhardt Jr. (R)	Dale Earnhardt, Inc.	Chevrolet	499	0	running	100	$40,885
22	25	44	Kyle Petty	Petty Enterprises	Pontiac	499	0	running	97	$39,935
23	2	24	Jeff Gordon	Hendrick Motorsports	Chevrolet	499	0	running	94	$49,985
24	39	26	Jimmy Spencer	Haas-Carter Motorsports	Ford	498	5	running	96	$39,710
25	36	60	Geoff Bodine	Joe Bessey Racing	Chevrolet	498	0	running	88	$39,965
26	24	55	Kenny Wallace	Andy Petree Racing	Chevrolet	498	0	running	85	$39,640
27	34	33	Joe Nemechek	Andy Petree Racing	Chevrolet	498	0	running	82	$38,930
28	14	11	Brett Bodine	Brett Bodine Racing	Ford	497	0	running	79	$27,720
29	42	14	Rick Mast	A. J. Foyt Enterprises	Pontiac	496	0	running	76	$27,710
30	38	97	Chad Little	Roush Racing	Ford	493	0	running	73	$39,300
31	43	71	Dave Marcis	Marcis Auto Racing	Chevrolet	489	0	running	70	$27,690
32	5	25	Jerry Nadeau	Hendrick Motorsports	Chevrolet	479	0	crash	67	$38,680
33	41	75	Wally Dallenbach Jr.	Galaxy Motorsports	Ford	472	0	running	64	$30,670
34	20	4	Bobby Hamilton	Morgan–McClure Motorsports	Chevrolet	451	0	crash	61	$38,160
35	18	12	Jeremy Mayfield	Penske-Kranefuss Racing	Ford	443	0	crash	58	$35,655
36	26	94	David Green	Bill Elliott Racing	Ford	416	0	crash	55	$35,635
37	9	77	Robert Pressley	Jasper Motorsports	Ford	395	0	crash	52	$27,619
38	33	32	Scott Pruett (R)	PPI Motorsports	Ford	391	0	crash	49	$27,600
39	22	17	Matt Kenseth (R)	Roush Racing	Ford	376	0	overheating	46	$35,575
40	21	9	Bobby Hillin Jr.	Melling Racing	Ford	314	0	crash	43	$27,525
41	13	13	Robby Gordon	Team Menard	Ford	121	0	steering	40	$27,500
42	27	66	Darrell Waltrip	Haas-Carter Motorsports	Ford	107	0	handling	37	$27,475
43	30	93	Dave Blaney (R)	Bill Davis Racing	Pontiac	49	0	crash	34	$27,450
Official race results

== Media ==
=== Television ===
The race was aired live on ESPN in the United States. Jerry Punch, 1965 race winner Ned Jarrett and 1973 race winner Benny Parsons called the race from the broadcast booth. Punch filled in for regular commentator Bob Jenkins who had was covering ESPN's coverage of the Belterra Resort Indy 300 at Kentucky Speedway. Bill Weber, John Kernan and Ray Dunlap handled pit road for the television side.

ESPN
Booth announcers		Pit reporters
Lap-by-lap	Color-commentators	Pit reporters
Jerry Punch	Ned Jarrett; Benny Parsons	Bill Weber; John Kernan; Ray Dunlap

Previous race: 2000 Pepsi 400 presented by Meijer	NASCAR Winston Cup Series; 2000 season	Next race: 2000 Pepsi Southern 500
