= 2000 Pepsi 400 presented by Meijer =

22nd race of the 2000 NASCAR Winston Cup Series

Race details
- Race 22 of 34 in the 2000 NASCAR Winston Cup Series
- The 2000 Pepsi 400 presented by Meijer program cover.
- Date: August 20, 2000
- Official name: 31st Annual Pepsi 400 presented by Meijer
- Location: Brooklyn, Michigan, Michigan International Speedway
- Course: Permanent racing facility
- Course length: 2 miles (3.2 km)
- Distance: 200 laps, 400 mi (643.737 km)
- Average speed: 132.597 miles per hour (213.394 km/h)

Pole position
Driver	Dale Earnhardt Jr.	Dale Earnhardt, Inc.
- Time: 37.667

Most laps led
Driver	Rusty Wallace	Penske-Kranefuss Racing
- Laps: 118

Winner
No. 2	Rusty Wallace	Penske-Kranefuss Racing

Television in the United States
- Network: NASCAR on ESPN
- Announcers: Bob Jenkins, Ned Jarrett, Benny Parsons

Radio in the United States
- Radio: Motor Racing Network

The 2000 Pepsi 400 presented by Meijer was the 22nd stock car race of the 2000 NASCAR Winston Cup Series and the 31st iteration of the event. The race was held on Sunday, August 20, 2000, in Brooklyn, Michigan, at Michigan International Speedway, a two-mile (3.2 km) moderate-banked D-shaped speedway. The race took the scheduled 200 laps to complete. At race's end, Penske-Kranefuss Racing driver Rusty Wallace, with the help of his crew chief, would pull away on the final restart with 18 to go to win his 52nd career NASCAR Winston Cup Series win and his third of the season. To fill out the podium, Ricky Rudd of Robert Yates Racing and Bobby Labonte of Joe Gibbs Racing would finish second and third, respectively.

== Background ==
The layout of Michigan International Speedway, the venue where the race was held.

The race was held at Michigan International Speedway, a two-mile (3.2 km) moderate-banked D-shaped speedway located in Brooklyn, Michigan. The track is used primarily for NASCAR events. It is known as a "sister track" to Texas World Speedway as MIS's oval design was a direct basis of TWS, with moderate modifications to the banking in the corners, and was used as the basis of Auto Club Speedway. The track is owned by International Speedway Corporation. Michigan International Speedway is recognized as one of motorsports' premier facilities because of its wide racing surface and high banking (by open-wheel standards; the 18-degree banking is modest by stock car standards).

=== Entry list ===
- (R) denotes rookie driver.

#	Driver	Team	Make
1	Steve Park	Dale Earnhardt, Inc.	Chevrolet
01	Ted Musgrave	Team SABCO	Chevrolet
2	Rusty Wallace	Penske-Kranefuss Racing	Ford
3	Dale Earnhardt	Richard Childress Racing	Chevrolet
4	Bobby Hamilton	Morgan–McClure Motorsports	Chevrolet
5	Terry Labonte	Hendrick Motorsports	Chevrolet
6	Mark Martin	Roush Racing	Ford
7	Michael Waltrip	Mattei Motorsports	Chevrolet
8	Dale Earnhardt Jr. (R)	Dale Earnhardt, Inc.	Chevrolet
9	Stacy Compton (R)	Melling Racing	Ford
10	Johnny Benson Jr.	Tyler Jet Motorsports	Pontiac
11	Brett Bodine	Brett Bodine Racing	Ford
12	Jeremy Mayfield	Penske-Kranefuss Racing	Ford
13	Robby Gordon	Team Menard	Ford
14	Rick Mast	A. J. Foyt Enterprises	Pontiac
16	Kevin Lepage	Roush Racing	Ford
17	Matt Kenseth (R)	Roush Racing	Ford
18	Bobby Labonte	Joe Gibbs Racing	Pontiac
20	Tony Stewart	Joe Gibbs Racing	Pontiac
21	Elliott Sadler	Wood Brothers Racing	Ford
22	Ward Burton	Bill Davis Racing	Pontiac
24	Jeff Gordon	Hendrick Motorsports	Chevrolet
25	Jerry Nadeau	Hendrick Motorsports	Chevrolet
26	Jimmy Spencer	Haas-Carter Motorsports	Ford
27	Mike Bliss (R)	Eel River Racing	Pontiac
28	Ricky Rudd	Robert Yates Racing	Ford
31	Mike Skinner	Richard Childress Racing	Chevrolet
32	Scott Pruett (R)	PPI Motorsports	Ford
33	Joe Nemechek	Andy Petree Racing	Chevrolet
36	Ken Schrader	MB2 Motorsports	Pontiac
40	Sterling Marlin	Team SABCO	Chevrolet
43	John Andretti	Petty Enterprises	Pontiac
44	Kyle Petty	Petty Enterprises	Pontiac
50	Ricky Craven	Midwest Transit Racing	Chevrolet
55	Kenny Wallace	Andy Petree Racing	Chevrolet
60	Geoff Bodine	Joe Bessey Racing	Chevrolet
66	Darrell Waltrip	Haas-Carter Motorsports	Ford
71	Kerry Earnhardt	Marcis Auto Racing	Chevrolet
75	Wally Dallenbach Jr.	Galaxy Motorsports	Ford
77	Robert Pressley	Jasper Motorsports	Ford
85	Carl Long	Mansion Motorsports	Ford
88	Dale Jarrett	Robert Yates Racing	Ford
90	Hut Stricklin	Donlavey Racing	Ford
93	Dave Blaney (R)	Bill Davis Racing	Pontiac
94	Bill Elliott	Bill Elliott Racing	Ford
95	David Keith	Sadler Brothers Racing	Ford
96	Andy Houston	PPI Motorsports	Ford
97	Chad Little	Roush Racing	Ford
99	Jeff Burton	Roush Racing	Ford
Official entry list

== Practice ==
=== First practice ===
The first practice session was held on Friday, August 18, at 1:35 PM EST. The session would last for 55 minutes. Dale Jarrett of Robert Yates Racing would set the fastest time in the session, with a lap of 37.678 and an average speed of 191.092 mph (307.533 km/h).

Pos.	#	Driver	Team	Make	Time	Speed
1	88	Dale Jarrett	Robert Yates Racing	Ford	37.678	191.092
2	6	Mark Martin	Roush Racing	Ford	37.779	190.582
3	10	Johnny Benson Jr.	Tyler Jet Motorsports	Pontiac	37.783	190.561
Full first practice results

=== Second practice ===
The second practice session was held on Saturday, August 19, at 9:00 AM EST. The session would last for one hour. Andy Houston of PPI Motorsports would set the fastest time in the session, with a lap of 38.066 and an average speed of 189.145 mph (304.399 km/h).

Pos.	#	Driver	Team	Make	Time	Speed
1	96	Andy Houston	PPI Motorsports	Ford	38.066	189.145
2	71	Kerry Earnhardt	Marcis Auto Racing	Chevrolet	38.118	188.887
3	90	Hut Stricklin	Donlavey Racing	Ford	38.163	188.664
Full second practice results

=== Third and final practice ===
The third and final practice session, sometimes referred to as Happy Hour, was held on Saturday, August 19, after the preliminary 2000 NAPAonline.com 250. Rusty Wallace of Penske-Kranefuss Racing would set the fastest time in the session, with a lap of 39.085 and an average speed of 184.213 mph (296.462 km/h).

Pos.	#	Driver	Team	Make	Time	Speed
1	2	Rusty Wallace	Penske-Kranefuss Racing	Ford	39.085	184.213
2	20	Tony Stewart (R)	Joe Gibbs Racing	Pontiac	39.233	183.518
3	25	Jerry Nadeau	Hendrick Motorsports	Chevrolet	39.274	183.327
Full Happy Hour practice results

== Qualifying ==
Qualifying was split into two rounds. The first round was held on Friday, August 18, at 3:30 PM EST. Each driver would have two laps to set a fastest time; the fastest of the two would count as their official qualifying lap. During the first round, the top 25 drivers in the round would be guaranteed a starting spot in the race. If a driver was not able to guarantee a spot in the first round, they had the option to scrub their time from the first round and try and run a faster lap time in a second round qualifying run, held on Saturday, August 19, at 10:45 AM EST. As with the first round, each driver would have two laps to set a fastest time; the fastest of the two would count as their official qualifying lap. Positions 26-36 would be decided on time, while positions 37-43 would be based on provisionals. Six spots are awarded by the use of provisionals based on owner's points. The seventh is awarded to a past champion who has not otherwise qualified for the race. If no past champion needs the provisional, the next team in the owner points will be awarded a provisional.

Dale Earnhardt Jr. of Dale Earnhardt, Inc. would win the pole, setting a time of 37.667 and an average speed of 191.149 miles per hour (307.624 km/h).

Six drivers would fail to qualify: Geoff Bodine, Darrell Waltrip, Stacy Compton, Kyle Petty, David Keith, and Carl Long.

=== Full qualifying results ===
Pos.	#	Driver	Team	Make	Time	Speed
1	8	Dale Earnhardt Jr. (R)	Dale Earnhardt, Inc.	Chevrolet	37.667	191.149
2	88	Dale Jarrett	Robert Yates Racing	Ford	37.903	189.959
3	14	Rick Mast	A. J. Foyt Enterprises	Pontiac	37.915	189.898
4	28	Ricky Rudd	Robert Yates Racing	Ford	37.941	189.768
5	18	Bobby Labonte	Joe Gibbs Racing	Pontiac	37.965	189.648
6	12	Jeremy Mayfield	Penske-Kranefuss Racing	Ford	37.970	189.623
7	6	Mark Martin	Roush Racing	Ford	37.971	189.618
8	25	Jerry Nadeau	Hendrick Motorsports	Chevrolet	37.991	189.519
9	22	Ward Burton	Bill Davis Racing	Pontiac	37.998	189.484
10	2	Rusty Wallace	Penske-Kranefuss Racing	Ford	37.999	189.479
11	32	Scott Pruett (R)	PPI Motorsports	Ford	38.020	189.374
12	36	Ken Schrader	MB2 Motorsports	Pontiac	38.033	189.309
13	50	Ricky Craven	Midwest Transit Racing	Chevrolet	38.048	189.235
14	31	Mike Skinner	Richard Childress Racing	Chevrolet	38.084	189.056
15	1	Steve Park	Dale Earnhardt, Inc.	Chevrolet	38.084	189.056
16	24	Jeff Gordon	Hendrick Motorsports	Chevrolet	38.093	189.011
17	94	Bill Elliott	Bill Elliott Racing	Ford	38.119	188.882
18	7	Michael Waltrip	Mattei Motorsports	Chevrolet	38.231	188.329
19	20	Tony Stewart (R)	Joe Gibbs Racing	Pontiac	38.246	188.255
20	75	Wally Dallenbach Jr.	Galaxy Motorsports	Ford	38.249	188.240
21	40	Sterling Marlin	Team SABCO	Chevrolet	38.263	188.171
22	93	Dave Blaney (R)	Bill Davis Racing	Pontiac	38.280	188.088
23	10	Johnny Benson Jr.	Tyler Jet Motorsports	Pontiac	38.282	188.078
24	99	Jeff Burton	Roush Racing	Ford	38.290	188.039
25	33	Joe Nemechek	Andy Petree Racing	Chevrolet	38.309	187.945
26	90	Hut Stricklin	Donlavey Racing	Ford	38.175	188.605
27	71	Kerry Earnhardt	Marcis Auto Racing	Chevrolet	38.175	188.605
28	17	Matt Kenseth (R)	Roush Racing	Ford	38.251	188.230
29	43	John Andretti	Petty Enterprises	Pontiac	38.252	188.225
30	16	Kevin Lepage	Roush Racing	Ford	38.330	187.842
31	27	Mike Bliss (R)	Eel River Racing	Pontiac	38.343	187.779
32	21	Elliott Sadler	Wood Brothers Racing	Ford	38.348	187.754
33	5	Terry Labonte	Hendrick Motorsports	Chevrolet	38.354	187.725
34	55	Kenny Wallace	Andy Petree Racing	Chevrolet	38.363	187.681
35	96	Andy Houston	PPI Motorsports	Ford	38.395	187.524
36	97	Chad Little	Roush Racing	Ford	38.401	187.495
Provisionals
37	3	Dale Earnhardt	Richard Childress Racing	Chevrolet	38.435	187.329
38	77	Robert Pressley	Jasper Motorsports	Ford	38.452	187.246
39	26	Jimmy Spencer	Haas-Carter Motorsports	Ford	38.450	187.256
40	01	Ted Musgrave	Team SABCO	Chevrolet	38.711	185.994
41	4	Bobby Hamilton	Morgan–McClure Motorsports	Chevrolet	38.525	186.892
42	11	Brett Bodine	Brett Bodine Racing	Ford	38.407	187.466
43	13	Robby Gordon	Team Menard	Ford	38.754	185.787
Failed to qualify
44	60	Geoff Bodine	Joe Bessey Racing	Chevrolet	38.409	187.456
45	66	Darrell Waltrip	Haas-Carter Motorsports	Ford	38.551	186.766
46	9	Stacy Compton (R)	Melling Racing	Ford	38.716	185.970
47	44	Kyle Petty	Petty Enterprises	Pontiac	38.729	185.907
48	95	David Keith	Sadler Brothers Racing	Ford	40.157	179.296
49	85	Carl Long	Mansion Motorsports	Ford	40.497	177.791
Official first round qualifying results
Official starting lineup

== Race results ==
Fin	St	#	Driver	Team	Make	Laps	Led	Status	Pts	Winnings
1	10	2	Rusty Wallace	Penske-Kranefuss Racing	Ford	200	118	running	185	$110,460
2	4	28	Ricky Rudd	Robert Yates Racing	Ford	200	42	running	175	$94,530
3	5	18	Bobby Labonte	Joe Gibbs Racing	Pontiac	200	19	running	170	$73,430
4	2	88	Dale Jarrett	Robert Yates Racing	Ford	200	0	running	160	$70,275
5	23	10	Johnny Benson Jr.	Tyler Jet Motorsports	Pontiac	200	0	running	155	$44,740
6	37	3	Dale Earnhardt	Richard Childress Racing	Chevrolet	200	0	running	150	$51,190
7	39	26	Jimmy Spencer	Haas-Carter Motorsports	Ford	200	0	running	146	$50,365
8	28	17	Matt Kenseth (R)	Roush Racing	Ford	200	0	running	142	$42,490
9	9	22	Ward Burton	Bill Davis Racing	Pontiac	200	0	running	138	$49,540
10	24	99	Jeff Burton	Roush Racing	Ford	200	5	running	139	$60,090
11	7	6	Mark Martin	Roush Racing	Ford	200	0	running	130	$44,515
12	8	25	Jerry Nadeau	Hendrick Motorsports	Chevrolet	200	0	running	127	$39,815
13	6	12	Jeremy Mayfield	Penske-Kranefuss Racing	Ford	200	0	running	124	$37,915
14	41	4	Bobby Hamilton	Morgan–McClure Motorsports	Chevrolet	200	0	running	121	$39,215
15	21	40	Sterling Marlin	Team SABCO	Chevrolet	200	0	running	118	$40,165
16	14	31	Mike Skinner	Richard Childress Racing	Chevrolet	200	0	running	115	$36,665
17	11	32	Scott Pruett (R)	PPI Motorsports	Ford	200	0	running	112	$25,115
18	30	16	Kevin Lepage	Roush Racing	Ford	200	1	running	114	$35,715
19	12	36	Ken Schrader	MB2 Motorsports	Pontiac	200	0	running	106	$27,415
20	33	5	Terry Labonte	Hendrick Motorsports	Chevrolet	200	0	running	103	$45,015
21	18	7	Michael Waltrip	Mattei Motorsports	Chevrolet	200	0	running	100	$35,865
22	36	97	Chad Little	Roush Racing	Ford	200	0	running	97	$34,665
23	25	33	Joe Nemechek	Andy Petree Racing	Chevrolet	200	0	running	94	$34,440
24	22	93	Dave Blaney (R)	Bill Davis Racing	Pontiac	200	0	running	91	$23,040
25	20	75	Wally Dallenbach Jr.	Galaxy Motorsports	Ford	200	0	running	88	$26,090
26	40	01	Ted Musgrave	Team SABCO	Chevrolet	199	1	running	90	$34,190
27	29	43	John Andretti	Petty Enterprises	Pontiac	199	1	running	87	$40,615
28	31	27	Mike Bliss (R)	Eel River Racing	Pontiac	199	0	running	79	$22,565
29	3	14	Rick Mast	A. J. Foyt Enterprises	Pontiac	199	0	running	76	$23,240
30	34	55	Kenny Wallace	Andy Petree Racing	Chevrolet	199	0	running	73	$33,915
31	1	8	Dale Earnhardt Jr. (R)	Dale Earnhardt, Inc.	Chevrolet	199	13	running	75	$37,710
32	38	77	Robert Pressley	Jasper Motorsports	Ford	188	0	engine	67	$25,180
33	15	1	Steve Park	Dale Earnhardt, Inc.	Chevrolet	179	0	engine	64	$32,630
34	43	13	Robby Gordon	Team Menard	Ford	177	0	crash	61	$22,080
35	35	96	Andy Houston	PPI Motorsports	Ford	156	0	engine	58	$22,030
36	16	24	Jeff Gordon	Hendrick Motorsports	Chevrolet	141	0	crash	55	$42,205
37	13	50	Ricky Craven	Midwest Transit Racing	Chevrolet	124	0	vibration	52	$21,980
38	17	94	Bill Elliott	Bill Elliott Racing	Ford	123	0	crash	49	$29,905
39	26	90	Hut Stricklin	Donlavey Racing	Ford	101	0	engine	46	$22,395
40	32	21	Elliott Sadler	Wood Brothers Racing	Ford	63	0	crash	43	$29,860
41	19	20	Tony Stewart (R)	Joe Gibbs Racing	Pontiac	36	0	crash	40	$41,250
42	42	11	Brett Bodine	Brett Bodine Racing	Ford	23	0	engine	37	$21,840
43	27	71	Kerry Earnhardt	Marcis Auto Racing	Chevrolet	5	0	crash	34	$21,830
Official race results

Previous race: 2000 Global Crossing @ The Glen	NASCAR Winston Cup Series; 2000 season	Next race: 2000 goracing.com 500
