= 2000 Global Crossing @ The Glen =

21st race of the 2000 NASCAR Winston Cup Series

Race details
- Race 21 of 34 in the 2000 NASCAR Winston Cup Series
- The 2000 Global Crossing @ The Glen program cover.
- Date: August 13, 2000
- Official name: 15th Annual Global Crossing @ The Glen
- Location: Watkins Glen, New York, Watkins Glen International
- Course: Permanent racing facility
- Course length: 2.454 miles (3.949 km)
- Distance: 90 laps, 220.5 mi (354.86 km)
- Scheduled distance: 90 laps, 220.5 mi (354.86 km)
- Average speed: 91.336 miles per hour (146.991 km/h)

Pole position
Driver	Bobby Labonte	Joe Gibbs Racing
- Time: Set by 2000 owner's points

Most laps led
Driver	Steve Park	Dale Earnhardt, Inc.
- Laps: 53

Winner
No. 1	Steve Park	Dale Earnhardt, Inc.

Television in the United States
- Network: ESPN
- Announcers: Bob Jenkins, Ned Jarrett, Benny Parsons

Radio in the United States
- Radio: Motor Racing Network

The layout of Watkins Glen International NASCAR uses.

The 2000 Global Crossing @ The Glen was the 21st stock car race of the 2000 NASCAR Winston Cup Series and the 15th iteration of the event. The race was held on Sunday, August 13, 2000, at the shortened layout of Watkins Glen International, a 2.454 miles (3.949 km) permanent road course layout. The race took the scheduled 90 laps to complete. At race's end, Steve Park, driving for Dale Earnhardt, Inc., would manage to dominate the late stages of the race to win his first career NASCAR Winston Cup Series win and his only win of the season. To fill out the podium, Mark Martin and Jeff Burton, both driving for Roush Racing, would finish second and third, respectively.

== Background ==
Watkins Glen International (nicknamed "The Glen") is an automobile race track located in Watkins Glen, New York at the southern tip of Seneca Lake. It was long known around the world as the home of the Formula One United States Grand Prix, which it hosted for twenty consecutive years (1961–1980), but the site has been home to road racing of nearly every class, including the World Sportscar Championship, Trans-Am, Can-Am, NASCAR Sprint Cup Series, the International Motor Sports Association and the IndyCar Series.

Initially, public roads in the village were used for the race course. In 1956 a permanent circuit for the race was built. In 1968 the race was extended to six hours, becoming the 6 Hours of Watkins Glen. The circuit's current layout has more or less been the same since 1971, although a chicane was installed at the uphill Esses in 1975 to slow cars through these corners, where there was a fatality during practice at the 1973 United States Grand Prix. The chicane was removed in 1985, but another chicane called the "Inner Loop" was installed in 1992 after J. D. McDuffie's fatal accident during the previous year's NASCAR Winston Cup event.

The circuit is known as the Mecca of North American road racing and is a very popular venue among fans and drivers. The facility is currently owned by NASCAR.

=== Entry list ===
- (R) denotes rookie driver.

#	Driver	Team	Make
1	Steve Park	Dale Earnhardt, Inc.	Chevrolet
01	P. J. Jones	Team SABCO	Chevrolet
2	Rusty Wallace	Penske-Kranefuss Racing	Ford
3	Dale Earnhardt	Richard Childress Racing	Chevrolet
4	Bobby Hamilton	Morgan–McClure Motorsports	Chevrolet
5	Ron Hornaday Jr.	Hendrick Motorsports	Chevrolet
6	Mark Martin	Roush Racing	Ford
7	Michael Waltrip	Mattei Motorsports	Chevrolet
8	Dale Earnhardt Jr. (R)	Dale Earnhardt, Inc.	Chevrolet
9	Stacy Compton (R)	Melling Racing	Ford
10	Johnny Benson Jr.	Tyler Jet Motorsports	Pontiac
11	Brett Bodine	Brett Bodine Racing	Ford
12	Tom Hubert	Penske-Kranefuss Racing	Ford
13	Robby Gordon	Team Menard	Ford
14	Rick Mast	A. J. Foyt Enterprises	Pontiac
16	Kevin Lepage	Roush Racing	Ford
17	Matt Kenseth (R)	Roush Racing	Ford
18	Bobby Labonte	Joe Gibbs Racing	Pontiac
20	Tony Stewart	Joe Gibbs Racing	Pontiac
21	Elliott Sadler	Wood Brothers Racing	Ford
22	Ward Burton	Bill Davis Racing	Pontiac
23	Boris Said	Spencer Motor Ventures	Ford
24	Jeff Gordon	Hendrick Motorsports	Chevrolet
25	Jerry Nadeau	Hendrick Motorsports	Chevrolet
26	Jimmy Spencer	Haas-Carter Motorsports	Ford
27	Mike Bliss (R)	Eel River Racing	Pontiac
28	Ricky Rudd	Robert Yates Racing	Ford
31	Mike Skinner	Richard Childress Racing	Chevrolet
32	Scott Pruett (R)	PPI Motorsports	Ford
33	Joe Nemechek	Andy Petree Racing	Chevrolet
34	Todd Bodine	Cicci-Welliver Racing	Chevrolet
36	Ken Schrader	MB2 Motorsports	Pontiac
40	Sterling Marlin	Team SABCO	Chevrolet
43	John Andretti	Petty Enterprises	Pontiac
44	Kyle Petty	Petty Enterprises	Pontiac
55	Kenny Wallace	Andy Petree Racing	Chevrolet
60	Geoff Bodine	Joe Bessey Racing	Chevrolet
66	Darrell Waltrip	Haas-Carter Motorsports	Ford
71	R. K. Smith	Marcis Auto Racing	Chevrolet
75	Wally Dallenbach Jr.	Galaxy Motorsports	Ford
77	Robert Pressley	Jasper Motorsports	Ford
87	Ron Fellows	NEMCO Motorsports	Chevrolet
88	Dale Jarrett	Robert Yates Racing	Ford
90	Brian Simo	Donlavey Racing	Ford
93	Dave Blaney (R)	Bill Davis Racing	Pontiac
94	Bill Elliott	Bill Elliott Racing	Ford
97	Chad Little	Roush Racing	Ford
99	Jeff Burton	Roush Racing	Ford
Official entry list

== Practice ==
=== First practice ===
The first practice session was held on Friday, August 11, in the afternoon. Boris Said of Spencer Motor Ventures would set the fastest time in the session, with a lap of 1:12.580 and an average speed of 121.521 mph (195.569 km/h).

Pos.	#	Driver	Team	Make	Time	Speed
1	23	Boris Said	Spencer Motor Ventures	Ford	1:12.580	121.521
2	24	Jeff Gordon	Hendrick Motorsports	Chevrolet	1:12.698	121.323
3	11	Brett Bodine	Brett Bodine Racing	Ford	1:12.789	121.172
Full first practice results

=== Second practice ===
The second practice session was held on Saturday, August 12, in the morning. Boris Said of Spencer Motor Ventures would set the fastest time in the session, with a lap of 1:11.532 and an average speed of 123.301 mph (198.434 km/h).

Pos.	#	Driver	Team	Make	Time	Speed
1	23	Boris Said	Spencer Motor Ventures	Ford	1:11.532	123.301
2	28	Ricky Rudd	Robert Yates Racing	Ford	1:11.708	122.999
3	25	Jerry Nadeau	Hendrick Motorsports	Chevrolet	1:11.909	122.655
Full second practice results

=== Third and final practice ===
The third and final practice session, sometimes referred to as Happy Hour, was held on Saturday, August 12, in the afternoon. Jeff Gordon of Hendrick Motorsports would set the fastest time in the session, with a lap of 1:12.660 and an average speed of 121.387 mph (195.353 km/h).

Pos.	#	Driver	Team	Make	Time	Speed
1	24	Jeff Gordon	Hendrick Motorsports	Chevrolet	1:12.660	121.387
2	87	Ron Fellows	NEMCO Motorsports	Chevrolet	1:12.667	121.375
3	20	Tony Stewart (R)	Joe Gibbs Racing	Pontiac	1:12.712	121.300
Full Happy Hour practice results

== Qualifying ==
Qualifying was scheduled to be held on Saturday, August 12, after numerous rain delays had delayed the session. However, rain would persist throughout Saturday, and thus, would cancel qualifying. In the case that qualifying is canceled, the first 35 spots are taken by the teams in the top 35 in owner's points. Then, the 36th spot is given to a champion who is not already in the field. Finally, positions 37-43 are based on the qualifying order that NASCAR had originally slated the drivers to go in, in the case that NASCAR was to run qualifying. Out of the drivers who did not lock themselves in by points or a champion's provisional, the first seven in the order of those drivers would qualify for the race.

Bobby Labonte of Joe Gibbs Racing would win the pole, having the highest number of owner's points.

Five drivers would fail to qualify: Boris Said, Scott Pruett, R. K. Smith, Brett Bodine, and Brian Simo.

=== Full starting lineup ===
Pos.	#	Driver	Team	Make
1	18	Bobby Labonte	Joe Gibbs Racing	Pontiac
2	88	Dale Jarrett	Robert Yates Racing	Ford
3	3	Dale Earnhardt	Richard Childress Racing	Chevrolet
4	99	Jeff Burton	Roush Racing	Ford
5	2	Rusty Wallace	Penske-Kranefuss Racing	Ford
6	20	Tony Stewart (R)	Joe Gibbs Racing	Pontiac
7	22	Ward Burton	Bill Davis Racing	Pontiac
8	24	Jeff Gordon	Hendrick Motorsports	Chevrolet
9	28	Ricky Rudd	Robert Yates Racing	Ford
10	6	Mark Martin	Roush Racing	Ford
11	31	Mike Skinner	Richard Childress Racing	Chevrolet
12	17	Matt Kenseth (R)	Roush Racing	Ford
13	5	Ron Hornaday Jr.	Hendrick Motorsports	Chevrolet
14	8	Dale Earnhardt Jr. (R)	Dale Earnhardt, Inc.	Chevrolet
15	10	Johnny Benson Jr.	Tyler Jet Motorsports	Pontiac
16	12	Tom Hubert	Penske-Kranefuss Racing	Ford
17	94	Bill Elliott	Bill Elliott Racing	Ford
18	1	Steve Park	Dale Earnhardt, Inc.	Chevrolet
19	36	Ken Schrader	MB2 Motorsports	Pontiac
20	40	Sterling Marlin	Team SABCO	Chevrolet
21	33	Joe Nemechek	Andy Petree Racing	Chevrolet
22	97	Chad Little	Roush Racing	Ford
23	77	Robert Pressley	Jasper Motorsports	Ford
24	26	Jimmy Spencer	Haas-Carter Motorsports	Ford
25	25	Jerry Nadeau	Hendrick Motorsports	Chevrolet
26	43	John Andretti	Petty Enterprises	Pontiac
27	7	Michael Waltrip	Mattei Motorsports	Chevrolet
28	16	Kevin Lepage	Roush Racing	Ford
29	01	P. J. Jones	Team SABCO	Chevrolet
30	55	Kenny Wallace	Andy Petree Racing	Chevrolet
31	4	Bobby Hamilton	Morgan–McClure Motorsports	Chevrolet
32	21	Elliott Sadler	Wood Brothers Racing	Ford
33	93	Dave Blaney (R)	Bill Davis Racing	Pontiac
34	60	Geoff Bodine	Joe Bessey Racing	Chevrolet
35	75	Wally Dallenbach Jr.	Galaxy Motorsports	Ford
Champion's Provisional
36	66	Darrell Waltrip	Haas-Carter Motorsports	Ford
Qualified by qualifying draw
37	27	Mike Bliss (R)	Eel River Racing	Pontiac
38	44	Kyle Petty	Petty Enterprises	Pontiac
39	14	Rick Mast	A. J. Foyt Enterprises	Pontiac
40	87	Ron Fellows	NEMCO Motorsports	Chevrolet
41	9	Stacy Compton (R)	Melling Racing	Ford
42	13	Robby Gordon	Team Menard	Ford
43	34	Todd Bodine	Cicci-Welliver Racing	Chevrolet
Failed to qualify
44	23	Boris Said	Spencer Motor Ventures	Ford
45	32	Scott Pruett (R)	PPI Motorsports	Ford
46	71	R. K. Smith	Marcis Auto Racing	Chevrolet
47	11	Brett Bodine	Brett Bodine Racing	Ford
48	90	Brian Simo	Donlavey Racing	Ford
Official starting lineup

== Race results ==
Fin	St	#	Driver	Team	Make	Laps	Led	Status	Pts	Winnings
1	18	1	Steve Park	Dale Earnhardt, Inc.	Chevrolet	90	53	running	185	$124,870
2	10	6	Mark Martin	Roush Racing	Ford	90	2	running	175	$73,870
3	4	99	Jeff Burton	Roush Racing	Ford	90	14	running	170	$75,685
4	42	13	Robby Gordon	Team Menard	Ford	90	1	running	165	$52,600
5	1	18	Bobby Labonte	Joe Gibbs Racing	Pontiac	90	15	running	160	$60,605
6	6	20	Tony Stewart	Joe Gibbs Racing	Pontiac	90	0	running	150	$53,190
7	2	88	Dale Jarrett	Robert Yates Racing	Ford	90	0	running	146	$57,210
8	21	33	Joe Nemechek	Andy Petree Racing	Chevrolet	90	0	running	142	$49,835
9	35	75	Wally Dallenbach Jr.	Galaxy Motorsports	Ford	90	2	running	143	$35,055
10	12	17	Matt Kenseth (R)	Roush Racing	Ford	90	0	running	134	$54,565
11	9	28	Ricky Rudd	Robert Yates Racing	Ford	90	3	running	135	$40,580
12	22	97	Chad Little	Roush Racing	Ford	90	0	running	127	$39,940
13	17	94	Bill Elliott	Bill Elliott Racing	Ford	90	0	running	124	$40,200
14	30	55	Kenny Wallace	Andy Petree Racing	Chevrolet	90	0	running	121	$41,335
15	13	5	Ron Hornaday Jr.	Hendrick Motorsports	Chevrolet	90	0	running	118	$47,020
16	31	4	Bobby Hamilton	Morgan–McClure Motorsports	Chevrolet	90	0	running	115	$40,275
17	27	7	Michael Waltrip	Mattei Motorsports	Chevrolet	90	0	running	112	$38,430
18	19	36	Ken Schrader	MB2 Motorsports	Pontiac	90	0	running	109	$30,185
19	39	14	Rick Mast	A. J. Foyt Enterprises	Pontiac	90	0	running	106	$27,005
20	36	66	Darrell Waltrip	Haas-Carter Motorsports	Ford	90	0	running	103	$33,685
21	29	01	P. J. Jones	Team SABCO	Chevrolet	90	0	running	100	$37,555
22	7	22	Ward Burton	Bill Davis Racing	Pontiac	90	0	running	97	$44,525
23	8	24	Jeff Gordon	Hendrick Motorsports	Chevrolet	90	0	running	94	$46,095
24	34	60	Geoff Bodine	Joe Bessey Racing	Chevrolet	90	0	running	91	$37,125
25	3	3	Dale Earnhardt	Richard Childress Racing	Chevrolet	90	0	running	88	$45,180
26	23	77	Robert Pressley	Jasper Motorsports	Ford	90	0	running	85	$28,910
27	15	10	Johnny Benson Jr.	Tyler Jet Motorsports	Pontiac	90	0	running	82	$28,690
28	32	21	Elliott Sadler	Wood Brothers Racing	Ford	90	0	running	79	$36,520
29	41	9	Stacy Compton (R)	Melling Racing	Ford	90	0	running	76	$28,450
30	20	40	Sterling Marlin	Team SABCO	Chevrolet	90	0	running	73	$36,375
31	24	26	Jimmy Spencer	Haas-Carter Motorsports	Ford	90	0	running	70	$33,310
32	28	16	Kevin Lepage	Roush Racing	Ford	90	0	running	67	$33,235
33	16	12	Tom Hubert	Penske-Kranefuss Racing	Ford	90	0	running	64	$33,175
34	5	2	Rusty Wallace	Penske-Kranefuss Racing	Ford	89	0	running	61	$43,140
35	33	93	Dave Blaney (R)	Bill Davis Racing	Pontiac	89	0	running	58	$25,105
36	11	31	Mike Skinner	Richard Childress Racing	Chevrolet	87	0	running	55	$33,045
37	26	43	John Andretti	Petty Enterprises	Pontiac	86	0	running	52	$42,985
38	25	25	Jerry Nadeau	Hendrick Motorsports	Chevrolet	67	0	handling	49	$32,925
39	37	27	Mike Bliss (R)	Eel River Racing	Pontiac	61	0	engine	46	$24,890
40	14	8	Dale Earnhardt Jr. (R)	Dale Earnhardt, Inc.	Chevrolet	60	0	transmission	43	$34,830
41	38	44	Kyle Petty	Petty Enterprises	Pontiac	38	0	crash	40	$32,795
42	43	34	Todd Bodine	Cicci-Welliver Racing	Chevrolet	31	0	clutch	37	$24,760
43	40	87	Ron Fellows	NEMCO Motorsports	Chevrolet	21	0	engine	34	$24,725
Failed to qualify
44		23	Boris Said	Spencer Motor Ventures	Ford					
45		32	Scott Pruett (R)	PPI Motorsports	Ford					
46		71	R. K. Smith	Marcis Auto Racing	Chevrolet					
47		11	Brett Bodine	Brett Bodine Racing	Ford					
48		90	Brian Simo	Donlavey Racing	Ford					
Official race results

Previous race: 2000 Brickyard 400	NASCAR Winston Cup Series; 2000 season	Next race: 2000 Pepsi 400 presented by Meijer
