= 1996 The Bud at The Glen =

20th race of the 1996 NASCAR Winston Cup Series

Race details
- Race 20 of 31 in the 1996 NASCAR Winston Cup Series
- The 1996 The Bud at The Glen program cover, featuring Mark Martin.
- Date: August 11, 1996
- Official name: 11th Annual The Bud at The Glen
- Location: Watkins Glen, New York, Watkins Glen International
- Course: Permanent racing facility
- Course length: 2.45 miles (3.943 km)
- Distance: 90 laps, 220.5 mi (354.86 km)
- Scheduled distance: 90 laps, 220.5 mi (354.86 km)
- Average speed: 92.334 miles per hour (148.597 km/h)

Pole position
Driver	Dale Earnhardt	Richard Childress Racing
- Time: 1:13.054

Most laps led
Driver	Dale Earnhardt	Richard Childress Racing
- Laps: 54

Winner
No. 7	Geoff Bodine	Geoff Bodine Racing

Television in the United States
- Network: ESPN
- Announcers: Bob Jenkins, Ned Jarrett, Benny Parsons

Radio in the United States
- Radio: Motor Racing Network

The 1996 The Bud at The Glen was the 20th stock car race of the 1996 NASCAR Winston Cup Series and the 11th iteration of the event. The race was held on Sunday, August 11, 1996, in Watkins Glen, New York, at the shortened layout of Watkins Glen International, a 2.45 miles (3.943 km) permanent road course layout. The race took the scheduled 90 laps to complete. In the final laps of the race, Geoff Bodine, driving for his family-owned team Geoff Bodine Racing, would manage to come victorious in a battle for the lead with eight to go and pull away to win his 18th and final NASCAR Winston Cup Series victory and his only victory of the season. To fill out the top three, Hendrick Motorsports driver Terry Labonte and Roush Racing driver Mark Martin would finish second and third, respectively.

== Background ==
The layout of Watkins Glen International NASCAR uses.

Watkins Glen International (nicknamed "The Glen") is an automobile race track located in Watkins Glen, New York at the southern tip of Seneca Lake. It was long known around the world as the home of the Formula One United States Grand Prix, which it hosted for twenty consecutive years (1961–1980), but the site has been home to road racing of nearly every class, including the World Sportscar Championship, Trans-Am, Can-Am, NASCAR Sprint Cup Series, the International Motor Sports Association and the IndyCar Series.

Initially, public roads in the village were used for the race course. In 1956 a permanent circuit for the race was built. In 1968 the race was extended to six hours, becoming the 6 Hours of Watkins Glen. The circuit's current layout has more or less been the same since 1971, although a chicane was installed at the uphill Esses in 1975 to slow cars through these corners, where there was a fatality during practice at the 1973 United States Grand Prix. The chicane was removed in 1985, but another chicane called the "Inner Loop" was installed in 1992 after J. D. McDuffie's fatal accident during the previous year's NASCAR Winston Cup event.

The circuit is known as the Mecca of North American road racing and is a very popular venue among fans and drivers. The facility is currently owned by NASCAR.

=== Entry list ===
- (R) denotes rookie driver.

No.	Driver	Team	Make
1	Rick Mast	Precision Products Racing	Pontiac
2	Rusty Wallace	Penske Racing South	Ford
3	Dale Earnhardt	Richard Childress Racing	Chevrolet
4	Sterling Marlin	Morgan–McClure Motorsports	Chevrolet
5	Terry Labonte	Hendrick Motorsports	Chevrolet
6	Mark Martin	Roush Racing	Ford
7	Geoff Bodine	Geoff Bodine Racing	Ford
8	Hut Stricklin	Stavola Brothers Racing	Ford
9	Lake Speed	Melling Racing	Ford
10	Ricky Rudd	Rudd Performance Motorsports	Ford
11	Brett Bodine	Brett Bodine Racing	Ford
12	Derrike Cope	Bobby Allison Motorsports	Ford
15	Wally Dallenbach Jr.	Bud Moore Engineering	Ford
16	Ted Musgrave	Roush Racing	Ford
17	Darrell Waltrip	Darrell Waltrip Motorsports	Chevrolet
18	Bobby Labonte	Joe Gibbs Racing	Chevrolet
21	Michael Waltrip	Wood Brothers Racing	Ford
22	Ward Burton	Bill Davis Racing	Pontiac
23	Jimmy Spencer	Haas-Carter Motorsports	Ford
24	Jeff Gordon	Hendrick Motorsports	Chevrolet
25	Ken Schrader	Hendrick Motorsports	Chevrolet
28	Ernie Irvan	Robert Yates Racing	Ford
29	Butch Leitzinger	Diamond Ridge Motorsports	Chevrolet
30	Johnny Benson Jr. (R)	Bahari Racing	Pontiac
33	Robert Pressley	Leo Jackson Motorsports	Chevrolet
34	Mike McLaughlin	Team 34	Chevrolet
37	Jeremy Mayfield	Kranefuss-Haas Racing	Ford
41	Ricky Craven	Larry Hedrick Motorsports	Chevrolet
42	Kyle Petty	Team SABCO	Pontiac
43	Bobby Hamilton	Petty Enterprises	Pontiac
71	Dave Marcis	Marcis Auto Racing	Chevrolet
75	Morgan Shepherd	Butch Mock Motorsports	Ford
77	Bobby Hillin Jr.	Jasper Motorsports	Ford
81	Kenny Wallace	FILMAR Racing	Ford
87	Joe Nemechek	NEMCO Motorsports	Chevrolet
88	Dale Jarrett	Robert Yates Racing	Ford
90	Dick Trickle	Donlavey Racing	Ford
94	Dorsey Schroeder	Bill Elliott Racing	Ford
98	Jeremy Mayfield	Cale Yarborough Motorsports	Ford
99	Jeff Burton	Roush Racing	Ford

== Qualifying ==
Qualifying was split into two rounds. The first round was held on Friday, August 9, at 2:00 PM EST. Each driver would have one lap to set a time. During the first round, the top 25 drivers in the round would be guaranteed a starting spot in the race. If a driver was not able to guarantee a spot in the first round, they had the option to scrub their time from the first round and try and run a faster lap time in a second round qualifying run, held on Saturday, August 10, at 10:30 AM EST. As with the first round, each driver would have one lap to set a time. For this specific race, positions 26-36 would be decided on time, and depending on who needed it, a select amount of positions were given to cars who had not otherwise qualified but were high enough in owner's points.

Dale Earnhardt, driving for Richard Childress Racing, would win the pole, setting a time of 1:13.054 and an average speed of 120.733 miles per hour (194.301 km/h). This was only two weeks after a devastating crash at Talladega Superspeedway left Earnhardt with a broken clavicle and cracked sternum.

Mike McLaughlin was the only driver to fail to qualify.

=== Full qualifying results ===
Pos.	#	Driver	Team	Make	Time	Speed
1	3	Dale Earnhardt	Richard Childress Racing	Chevrolet	1:13.054	120.733
2	88	Dale Jarrett	Robert Yates Racing	Ford	1:13.271	120.375
3	10	Ricky Rudd	Rudd Performance Motorsports	Ford	1:13.303	120.322
4	5	Terry Labonte	Hendrick Motorsports	Chevrolet	1:13.347	120.250
5	24	Jeff Gordon	Hendrick Motorsports	Chevrolet	1:13.543	119.930
6	2	Rusty Wallace	Penske Racing South	Ford	1:13.550	119.918
7	28	Ernie Irvan	Robert Yates Racing	Ford	1:13.554	119.912
8	21	Michael Waltrip	Wood Brothers Racing	Ford	1:13.693	119.686
9	87	Joe Nemechek	NEMCO Motorsports	Chevrolet	1:13.693	119.686
10	6	Mark Martin	Roush Racing	Ford	1:13.698	119.678
11	25	Ken Schrader	Hendrick Motorsports	Chevrolet	1:13.783	119.540
12	11	Brett Bodine	Brett Bodine Racing	Ford	1:13.997	119.194
13	7	Geoff Bodine	Geoff Bodine Racing	Ford	1:14.062	119.089
14	18	Bobby Labonte	Joe Gibbs Racing	Chevrolet	1:14.073	119.072
15	37	John Andretti	Kranefuss-Haas Racing	Ford	1:14.118	118.999
16	42	Kyle Petty	Team SABCO	Pontiac	1:14.195	118.876
17	29	Butch Leitzinger	Diamond Ridge Motorsports	Chevrolet	1:14.201	118.866
18	9	Lake Speed	Melling Racing	Ford	1:14.216	118.842
19	94	Dorsey Schroeder	Bill Elliott Racing	Ford	1:14.254	118.781
20	33	Robert Pressley	Leo Jackson Motorsports	Chevrolet	1:14.277	118.745
21	22	Ward Burton	Bill Davis Racing	Pontiac	1:14.428	118.504
22	16	Ted Musgrave	Roush Racing	Ford	1:14.435	118.493
23	99	Jeff Burton	Roush Racing	Ford	1:14.475	118.429
24	1	Rick Mast	Precision Products Racing	Pontiac	1:14.570	118.278
25	81	Kenny Wallace	FILMAR Racing	Ford	1:14.574	118.272
26	77	Bobby Hillin Jr.	Jasper Motorsports	Ford	1:14.466	118.443
27	4	Sterling Marlin	Morgan–McClure Motorsports	Chevrolet	1:14.503	118.384
28	17	Darrell Waltrip	Darrell Waltrip Motorsports	Chevrolet	1:14.578	118.265
29	98	Jeremy Mayfield	Cale Yarborough Motorsports	Ford	1:14.587	118.251
30	43	Bobby Hamilton	Petty Enterprises	Pontiac	1:14.741	118.008
31	15	Wally Dallenbach Jr.	Bud Moore Engineering	Ford	1:14.774	117.955
32	12	Derrike Cope	Bobby Allison Motorsports	Ford	1:14.795	117.922
33	23	Jimmy Spencer	Travis Carter Enterprises	Ford	1:14.871	117.803
34	90	Dick Trickle	Donlavey Racing	Ford	1:14.925	117.718
35	8	Hut Stricklin	Stavola Brothers Racing	Ford	1:15.421	116.944
36	30	Johnny Benson Jr. (R)	Bahari Racing	Pontiac	1:15.489	116.838
Provisionals
37	41	Ricky Craven	Larry Hedrick Motorsports	Chevrolet	-*	-*
38	75	Morgan Shepherd	Butch Mock Motorsports	Ford	-*	-*
39	71	Dave Marcis	Marcis Auto Racing	Chevrolet	-*	-*
Failed to qualify
40	34	Mike McLaughlin	Team 34	Chevrolet	-*	-*
Official first round qualifying results
Official starting lineup

== Race results ==
Fin	St	#	Driver	Team	Make	Laps	Led	Status	Pts	Winnings
1	13	7	Geoff Bodine	Geoff Bodine Racing	Ford	90	15	running	180	$88,740
2	4	5	Terry Labonte	Hendrick Motorsports	Chevrolet	90	2	running	175	$51,390
3	10	6	Mark Martin	Roush Racing	Ford	90	0	running	165	$44,755
4	5	24	Jeff Gordon	Hendrick Motorsports	Chevrolet	90	0	running	160	$44,370
5	14	18	Bobby Labonte	Joe Gibbs Racing	Chevrolet	90	3	running	160	$35,325
6	1	3	Dale Earnhardt	Richard Childress Racing	Chevrolet	90	54	running	160	$52,960
7	8	21	Michael Waltrip	Wood Brothers Racing	Ford	90	0	running	146	$26,640
8	9	87	Joe Nemechek	NEMCO Motorsports	Chevrolet	90	0	running	142	$25,330
9	38	75	Morgan Shepherd	Butch Mock Motorsports	Ford	90	0	running	138	$20,100
10	31	15	Wally Dallenbach Jr.	Bud Moore Engineering	Ford	90	0	running	134	$26,850
11	27	4	Sterling Marlin	Morgan–McClure Motorsports	Chevrolet	90	0	running	130	$28,675
12	22	16	Ted Musgrave	Roush Racing	Ford	90	0	running	127	$23,035
13	19	94	Dorsey Schroeder	Bill Elliott Racing	Ford	90	1	running	129	$22,745
14	12	11	Brett Bodine	Brett Bodine Racing	Ford	90	0	running	121	$22,405
15	36	30	Johnny Benson Jr. (R)	Bahari Racing	Pontiac	90	0	running	118	$23,015
16	32	12	Derrike Cope	Bobby Allison Motorsports	Ford	90	0	running	115	$21,795
17	18	9	Lake Speed	Melling Racing	Ford	90	0	running	112	$21,575
18	28	17	Darrell Waltrip	Darrell Waltrip Motorsports	Chevrolet	90	0	running	109	$21,355
19	33	23	Jimmy Spencer	Travis Carter Enterprises	Ford	90	0	running	106	$21,100
20	17	29	Butch Leitzinger	Diamond Ridge Motorsports	Chevrolet	90	0	running	103	$22,705
21	23	99	Jeff Burton	Roush Racing	Ford	90	0	running	100	$13,580
22	29	98	Jeremy Mayfield	Cale Yarborough Motorsports	Ford	90	0	running	97	$13,360
23	16	42	Kyle Petty	Team SABCO	Pontiac	90	0	running	94	$20,165
24	2	88	Dale Jarrett	Robert Yates Racing	Ford	90	0	running	91	$18,105
25	11	25	Ken Schrader	Hendrick Motorsports	Chevrolet	89	15	running	93	$20,270
26	15	37	John Andretti	Kranefuss-Haas Racing	Ford	89	0	running	85	$19,510
27	24	1	Rick Mast	Precision Products Racing	Pontiac	89	0	running	82	$16,900
28	39	71	Dave Marcis	Marcis Auto Racing	Chevrolet	89	0	running	79	$9,840
29	26	77	Bobby Hillin Jr.	Jasper Motorsports	Ford	87	0	running	76	$10,280
30	20	33	Robert Pressley	Leo Jackson Motorsports	Chevrolet	87	0	running	73	$16,720
31	25	81	Kenny Wallace	FILMAR Racing	Ford	78	0	running	70	$9,555
32	21	22	Ward Burton	Bill Davis Racing	Pontiac	77	0	engine	67	$24,490
33	6	2	Rusty Wallace	Penske Racing South	Ford	74	0	running	64	$24,430
34	3	10	Ricky Rudd	Rudd Performance Motorsports	Ford	69	0	running	61	$24,370
35	7	28	Ernie Irvan	Robert Yates Racing	Ford	68	0	running	58	$24,310
36	37	41	Ricky Craven	Larry Hedrick Motorsports	Chevrolet	61	0	engine	55	$17,215
37	35	8	Hut Stricklin	Stavola Brothers Racing	Ford	44	0	running	52	$9,215
38	30	43	Bobby Hamilton	Petty Enterprises	Pontiac	31	0	timing chain	49	$16,215
39	34	90	Dick Trickle	Donlavey Racing	Ford	29	0	transmission	46	$10,215
Official race results

Previous race: 1996 Brickyard 400	NASCAR Winston Cup Series; 1996 season	Next race: 1996 GM Goodwrench Dealer 400
