= 1976 Champion Spark Plug 400 =

Auto race held at Michigan International Speedway in 1976

Race details
- Race 20 of 30 in the 1976 NASCAR Winston Cup Series season
- 1976 Champion Spark Plug 400 program cover
- Date: August 22, 1976
- Official name: Champion Spark Plug 400
- Location: Michigan International Speedway, Brooklyn, Michigan
- Course length: 3.218 km (2.000 miles)
- Distance: 200 laps, 400 mi (643 km)
- Weather: Hot with temperatures of 91 °F (33 °C); wind speeds of 9.9 miles per hour (15.9 km/h)
- Average speed: 140.078 miles per hour (225.434 km/h)
- Attendance: 55,000

Pole position
Driver	David Pearson	Wood Brothers Racing

Most laps led
Driver	Cale Yarborough	Junior Johnson & Associates
- Laps: 125

Winner
No. 21	David Pearson	Wood Brothers Racing

Television in the United States
- Network: CBS
- Announcers: Ken Squier; Bobby Unser; Ned Jarrett

The 1976 Champion Spark Plug 400 was a NASCAR Winston Cup Series race that took place on August 22, 1976, at Michigan International Speedway in Brooklyn, Michigan.

== Background ==
Michigan International Speedway is a four-turn superspeedway that is 2 miles (3.2 km) long. Opened in 1968, the track's turns are banked at eighteen degrees, while the 3,600-foot-long front stretch, the location of the finish line, is banked at twelve degrees. The back stretch, has a five degree banking and is 2,242 feet long.

== Race report ==
36 drivers took part in this race; David Hobbs was the only foreigner. The closing portion of the race would see Cale Yarborough, Richard Petty, Benny Parsons, Cale Yarborough and David Pearson vie for the win. The first 67 laps of the race would see fairly even competition. Tighe Scott's last-place finish was due to his vehicle overheating on lap 6 of 200. Fifty-five thousand people would witness David Pearson defeat Cale Yarborough by more than a second. The total time of the race was 171 minutes.

Cale Yarborough led more than 120 laps in both of the MIS races in 1976 but had to settle for second place both times. David Pearson bested him to win both races in the Wood Brothers Purolator #21 Mercury as he claimed the season sweep. This race was almost a case of deja vu for fans as weirdly the "top four" was the almost the same in this one as it had been for the earlier race in June with Richard Petty and Bobby Allison as the only other cars on the lead lap just as before; the only difference was that Allison was third in June while Petty flip-flopped their positions with his third-place run here.

NASCAR handed out a total of $120,025 to all drivers ($663,225.86 when adjusted for inflation). The majority of the vehicles were Chevrolets.

While the winner took home $11,950 ($66,032.49 when adjusted for inflation), the last-place finisher took home $1,250 ($6,907.16 when adjusted for inflation).

Notable crew chiefs for this race included Billy Hagan, Junie Donlavey, Jake Elder, Harry Hyde, Dale Inman, Sterling Marlin and Tim Brewer.

John Haver would make his NASCAR Cup Series debut at this event while David Hobbs would wrap up his professional stock car career afterward.

=== Qualifying ===
Grid	No.	Driver	Manufacturer
1	21	David Pearson	Mercury
2	15	Buddy Baker	Ford
3	11	Cale Yarborough	Chevrolet
4	54	Lennie Pond	Chevrolet
5	43	Richard Petty	Dodge
6	2	Bobby Allison	Mercury
7	71	Dave Marcis	Dodge
8	72	Benny Parsons	Chevrolet
9	90	Dick Brooks	Ford
10	88	Darrell Waltrip	Chevrolet
11	47	Bruce Hill	Chevrolet
12	40	D.K. Ulrich	Chevrolet
13	52	Jimmy Means	Chevrolet
14	92	Skip Manning	Chevrolet
15	12	Neil Bonnett	Chevrolet
16	05	David Sisco	Chevrolet
17	36	Bobby Wawak	Chevrolet
18	24	Cecil Gordon	Chevrolet
19	7	Dean Dalton	Chevrolet
20	48	James Hylton	Chevrolet
21	18	Joe Frasson	Chevrolet
22	9	David Hobbs	Ford
23	60	Jackie Rogers	Chevrolet
24	19	Henley Gray	Chevrolet
25	51	John Haver	Chevrolet
26	8	Ed Negre	Dodge
27	70	J.D. McDuffie	Chevrolet
28	3	Richard Childress	Chevrolet
29	14	Coo Coo Marlin	Chevrolet
30	79	Frank Warren	Dodge

== Finishing order ==
POS	ST	#	DRIVER	SPONSOR / OWNER	CAR	LAPS	MONEY	STATUS	LED	PTS
1	1	21	David Pearson	Purolator (Wood Brothers)	Mercury	200	16700	running	27	180
2	3	11	Cale Yarborough	Holly Farms (Junior Johnson)	Chevrolet	200	13705	running	125	180
3	5	43	Richard Petty	STP (Petty Enterprises)	Dodge	200	10985	running	22	170
4	6	2	Bobby Allison	CAM 2 (Roger Penske)	Mercury	200	7375	running	6	165
5	7	71	Dave Marcis	K & K Insurance (Nord Krauskopf)	Dodge	199	6565	running	11	160
6	15	12	Neil Bonnett	Hawaiian Tropic (Neil Bonnett)	Chevrolet	195	2455	running	1	155
7	12	40	D.K. Ulrich	Garden State Auto (J.R. DeLotto)	Chevrolet	194	4545	running	0	146
8	27	70	J.D. McDuffie	J.D. McDuffie	Chevrolet	194	4335	running	0	142
9	8	72	Benny Parsons	King's Row Fireplace (L.G. DeWitt)	Chevrolet	194	5125	running	2	143
10	17	36	Bobby Wawak	J & B Corvette (John Gwinn)	Chevrolet	193	1855	running	0	134
11	24	19	Henley Gray	Belden Asphalt (Henley Gray)	Chevrolet	193	1755	running	0	130
12	29	14	Coo Coo Marlin	Cunningham-Kelley (H.B. Cunningham)	Chevrolet	192	3615	running	0	127
13	28	3	Richard Childress	Kansas Jack (Richard Childress)	Chevrolet	192	3255	running	0	124
14	14	92	Skip Manning	Stratagraph (Billy Hagan)	Chevrolet	192	2430	running	0	121
15	33	10	Terry Bivins	Sunny King (Bill Champion)	Ford	192	2875	running	0	118
16	36	25	Dick May	Don Robertson	Chevrolet	187	2635	running	0	115
17	22	9	David Hobbs	Coca-Cola (George Elliott)	Ford	187	1130	running	0	
18	19	7	Dean Dalton	Belden Asphalt (Dean Dalton)	Chevrolet	184	1105	running	0	109
19	11	47	Bruce Hill	Bruce Hill	Chevrolet	183	2300	engine	3	111
20	31	91	Harold Miller	Bartow Paving (Harold Miller)	Chevrolet	183	1055	running	0	103
21	20	48	James Hylton	Kockums (James Hylton)	Chevrolet	183	2030	running	0	100
22	32	61	Joe Mihalic	Lou Viglione	Chevrolet	175	1005	running	0	97
23	30	79	Frank Warren	Native Tan (Frank Warren)	Dodge	174	955	running	0	94
24	13	52	Jimmy Means	WIXC (Bill Gray)	Chevrolet	168	955	running	0	91
25	4	54	Lennie Pond	Pepsi-Cola (Ronnie Elder)	Chevrolet	166	1555	running	0	88
26	18	24	Cecil Gordon	Transmissions Unlimited (Cecil Gordon)	Chevrolet	154	1400	engine	0	85
27	10	88	Darrell Waltrip	Gatorade (DiGard Racing)	Chevrolet	134	3875	engine	0	82
28	21	18	Joe Frasson	Excuse Lounge (Joe Frasson)	Chevrolet	118	850	running	1	84
29	9	90	Dick Brooks	Truxmore (Junie Donlavey)	Ford	114	1335	engine	0	76
30	26	8	Ed Negre	Ed Negre	Dodge	108	1315	engine	0	73
31	2	15	Buddy Baker	Norris Industries (Bud Moore)	Ford	86	4100	engine	2	75
32	16	05	David Sisco	David Sisco	Chevrolet	70	1290	suspension	0	67
33	25	51	John Haver	Jim's Furniture (George Harrivel)	Chevrolet	49	780	engine	0	64
34	34	49	G.C. Spencer	G.C. Spencer	Dodge	37	770	engine	0	61
35	23	60	Jackie Rogers	Red Dog's (Lou Viglione)	Chevrolet	15	760	steering	0	58
36	35	30	Tighe Scott	Scotty's Fashions (Walter Ballard)	Chevrolet	6	1250	overheating	0	55

== Standings after the race ==
Pos	Driver	Points	Differential
1	Cale Yarborough	3026	0
2	Benny Parsons	2952	-74
3	Richard Petty	2936	-90
4	Bobby Allison	2832	-194
5 ▲	Dave Marcis	2652	-374
6 ▼	Lennie Pond	2599	-427
7	Richard Childress	2477	-549
8	Buddy Baker	2420	-606
9	David Pearson	2352	-674
10 ▲	J.D. McDuffie	2263	-763

Preceded by 1976 Talladega 500	NASCAR Winston Cup Season; 1976	Succeeded by 1976 Volunteer 400

Preceded by 1975	Champion Spark Plug 400 races 1976	Succeeded by 1977
