= 1975 Champion Spark Plug 400 =

Auto race held at Michigan International Speedway in 1975

Race details
- Race 20 of 30 in the 1975 NASCAR Winston Cup Series season
- Official program featuring Benny Parsons
- Date: August 24, 1975
- Official name: Champion Spark Plug 400
- Location: Michigan International Speedway, Brooklyn, Michigan
- Course: Permanent racing facility
- Course length: 3.218 km (2.000 miles)
- Distance: 200 laps, 400 mi (643 km)
- Weather: Hot with temperatures of 89.1 °F (31.7 °C); wind speeds up to 12.8 miles per hour (20.6 km/h)
- Average speed: 107.583 miles per hour (173.138 km/h)
- Attendance: 47,000

Pole position
Driver	David Pearson	Wood Brothers Racing

Most laps led
Driver	A. J. Foyt	Hoss Ellington
- Laps: 69

Winner
No. 43	Richard Petty	Petty Enterprises

Television in the United States
- Network: CBS Sports (aired September 20, 1975)

Radio in the United States
- Radio: MRN Radio

The 1975 Champion Spark Plug 400 was a NASCAR Winston Cup Series race that took place on August 24, 1975, at Michigan International Speedway in Brooklyn, Michigan.

Programs were sold for this race at a price of $1.50 per copy ($8.77 when adjusted for inflation). The cost of admission to this race was relatively cheap; children got in for US$5 ($29.22 when adjusted for inflation) while adults got decent seats for US$10 ($58.44 when adjusted for inflation).

This was the first Cup race at Michigan International Speedway to have a corporate title sponsor. In all prior years, the August Michigan Cup race had been called the Yankee 400.

== Background ==
Michigan International Speedway is a four-turn superspeedway that is 2 miles (3.2 km) long. Groundbreaking took place on September 28, 1967. Over 2.5 million cubic yards (1.9×10^{6} m^{3}) of dirt were moved to form the D-shaped oval. The track opened in 1968 with a total capacity of 25,000 seats. The track was originally built and owned by Lawrence H. LoPatin, a Detroit-area land developer who built the speedway at an estimated cost of $4–6 million. Financing was arranged by Thomas W Itin. Its first race took place on Sunday, October 13, 1968, with the running of the USAC 250 mile Championship Car Race won by Ronnie Bucknum.

== Race report ==
Two hundred laps were completed in three hours and forty-five seconds on the paved oval track spanning 2 miles (3.2 km). All of the 36 drivers who qualified for this race were born in the United States of America. Henley Gray started 374 races in Cup, but this is the only race where he led laps - two of them right after Coo Coo Marlin's wreck.

Six yellow flags slowed the race for 63 laps while the lead changed 25 times among twelve drivers. Richard Petty would defeat David Pearson by a distance of five feet as the lead changed four times between them in the final four laps in front of 47,000 audience members. This race was considered to be one of MRN's finest broadcasts; with interesting commentary during a long rain delay.

Pearson would win the pole position with a speed of 159.798 miles per hour (257.170 km/h) while the average speed of the race would be 107.583 miles per hour (173.138 km/h). Even with David Pearson finishing in second place, he managed to keep his finishing streak going with victories at the 1976 Cam 2 Motor Oil 400 and the 1976 Champion Spark Plug 400.

Jackie Rogers would receive the last-place finish for owner Lou Viglione and his 1975 Chevrolet team; he would match his career-best qualifying effort with a ninth-place starting spot but the motor on his #60 Chevrolet failed in the opening laps. The race saw A. J. Foyt lead sixty-eight laps before falling out with engine failure after 117 laps. Independent driver David Sisco led 28 laps en route to finishing 11th.

Prize winnings would range from $15,140 for the winner ($88,471 when adjusted for inflation) to $700 for the last-place finisher ($4,090 when adjusted for inflation). There were 36 cars on the official racing grid; most of them were Chevrolets. Terry Bivins would make his NASCAR debut in this race. Maynard Troyer would record his only top ten on his career. Richard Petty would keep his championship lead after this race. However, Dave Marcis would only be 573 points behind (despite not winning a race up to this point).

=== Qualifying ===
Grid	No.	Driver	Manufacturer
1	21	David Pearson	'73 Mercury
2	15	Buddy Baker	'75 Ford
3	28	A. J. Foyt	'75 Chevrolet
4	43	Richard Petty	'74 Dodge
5	16	Bobby Allison	'75 AMC Matador
6	14	Coo Coo Marlin	'75 Chevrolet
7	90	Dick Brooks	'73 Ford
8	11	Cale Yarborough	'75 Chevrolet
9	60	Jackie Rogers	'75 Chevrolet
10	72	Benny Parsons	'75 Chevrolet
11	88	Darrell Waltrip	'75 Chevrolet
12	24	Cecil Gordon	'75 Chevrolet
13	48	James Hylton	'74 Chevrolet
14	47	Bruce Hill	'75 Chevrolet
15	96	Richard Childress	'75 Chevrolet
16	7	Dean Dalton	'73 Ford
17	19	Henley Gray	'74 Chevrolet
18	05	David Sisco	'75 Chevrolet
19	79	Frank Warren	'74 Dodge
20	8	Ed Negre	'74 Dodge
21	71	Dave Marcis	'74 Dodge
22	70	J.D. McDuffie	'75 Chevrolet
23	98	Richie Panch	'75 Chevrolet
24	30	Walter Ballard	'75 Chevrolet
25	63	Terry Bivins	'75 Chevrolet

== Finishing order ==
Section reference:

POS	ST	#	DRIVER	SPONSOR / OWNER	CAR	LAPS	MONEY	STATUS	LED	PTS
1	4	43	Richard Petty	STP (Petty Enterprises)	'74 Dodge	200	18140	running	45	180
2	1	21	David Pearson	Purolator (Wood Brothers)	'73 Mercury	200	10735	running	33	175
3	8	11	Cale Yarborough	Holly Farms (Junior Johnson)	'75 Chevrolet	200	9385	running	0	165
4	5	16	Bobby Allison	Coca-Cola / AMC (Roger Penske)	'75 Matador	200	4060	running	9	165
5	21	71	Dave Marcis	K & K Insurance (Nord Krauskopf)	'74 Dodge	199	6310	running	3	160
6	2	15	Buddy Baker	Bud Moore Engineering (Bud Moore)	'75 Ford	198	5710	running	2	155
7	11	88	Darrell Waltrip	Terminal Transport (DiGard Racing)	'75 Chevrolet	198	4610	running	3	151
8	14	47	Bruce Hill	Dixie 500 (Bruce Hill)	'75 Chevrolet	197	2510	running	1	147
9	25	63	Terry Bivins	Moyer Chevrolet (Billy Moyer)	'75 Chevrolet	196	1910	running	0	138
10	16	7	Dean Dalton	Belden Asphalt (Dean Dalton)	'73 Ford	196	1810	running	0	134
11	24	30	Walter Ballard	Clyde Lynn Auto Parts (Walter Ballard)	'75 Chevrolet	196	2210	running	1	135
12	18	05	David Sisco	Reliable Plumbing (David Sisco)	'75 Chevrolet	196	2110	running	28	132
13	12	24	Cecil Gordon	Bob Stott Motors (Cecil Gordon)	'75 Chevrolet	195	1905	running	0	124
14	27	41	Grant Adcox	Adcox-Kirby (Herb Adcox)	'75 Chevrolet	195	1285	running	0	121
15	34	37	Bruce Jacobi	Opal's Truck Stop (Opal Voight)	'75 Chevrolet	195	1185	running	0	118
16	33	82	Ferrel Harris	Dan Walters Forever (Ferrel Harris)	'74 Dodge	194	1100	running	0	115
17	13	48	James Hylton	Nitro 9 (James Hylton)	'74 Chevrolet	194	1575	running	0	112
18	31	64	Elmo Langley	Independent Auto Salvage (Elmo Langley)	'73 Ford	194	1550	running	0	109
19	36	33	Dick May	Joli Boutique (Hiram Handy)	'75 Chevrolet	193	1025	running	0	106
20	7	90	Dick Brooks	Truxmore Industries (Junie Donlavey)	'73 Ford	192	1500	running	0	103
21	28	40	D.K. Ulrich	Garden State Auto Body (D.K. Ulrich)	'75 Chevrolet	192	975	running	0	100
22	29	67	Buddy Arrington	Pagoda Motel (Buddy Arrington)	'73 Plymouth	192	1450	running	0	97
23	35	25	Jabe Thomas	Thomas Racing (Don Robertson)	'74 Chevrolet	190	925	running	0	94
24	30	91	Harold Miller	Miller Racing (Harold Miller)	'75 Chevrolet	187	900	running	0	91
25	23	98	Richie Panch	Grey-Rock Brake Products (Bettie Panch)	'75 Chevrolet	183	1375	engine	0	88
26	19	79	Frank Warren	John 3:16 (Frank Warren)	'74 Dodge	154	1350	running	0	85
27	17	19	Henley Gray	Gray Racing (Henley Gray)	'74 Chevrolet	142	825	rear end	2	87
28	22	70	J.D. McDuffie	Butler's / Glenn's Landscaping (J.D. McDuffie)	'75 Chevrolet	132	1300	engine	0	79
29	26	65	Carl Adams	Adams Racing (Richard Mummert)	'73 Ford	119	785	engine	0	76
30	3	28	A. J. Foyt	Gilmore Enterprises (Hoss Ellington)	'75 Chevrolet	117	940	engine	69	83
31	15	96	Richard Childress	L.C. Newton Trucking (Tom Garn)	'75 Chevrolet	96	1250	engine	2	75
32	32	01	Earle Canavan	Kava Instant Coffee (Earle Canavan)	'74 Dodge	61	740	engine	0	67
33	20	8	Ed Negre	10,000 RPM Speed Equipment (Ed Negre)	'74 Dodge	58	1230	engine	2	69
34	10	72	Benny Parsons	King's Row Fireplace (L.G. DeWitt)	'75 Chevrolet	46	3220	engine	0	61
35	6	14	Coo Coo Marlin	Cunningham-Kelley (H.B. Cunningham)	'75 Chevrolet	17	1210	engine	0	58
36	9	60	Jackie Rogers	Viglione Racing (Lou Viglione)	'75 Chevrolet	6	700	engine	0	55

== Timeline ==
Section reference:

- Start: David Pearson was leading the starting grid as the first official lap commenced.
- Lap 6: Jackie Roberts fell out with engine failure.
- Lap 20: Coo Coo Marlin fell out with engine failure, causing a lengthy caution for repairs.
- Lap 48: Benny Parsons fell out with engine failure.
- Lap 58: Ed Negre fell out with engine failure.
- Lap 61: Earle Canavan fell out with engine failure.
- Lap 67: Caution due to rain, ended on lap 87.
- Lap 97: Richard Childress fell out with engine failure.
- Lap 117: A. J. Foyt fell out with engine failure.
- Lap 119: Carl Adams fell out with engine failure.
- Lap 132: J. D. McDuffie fell out with engine failure.
- Lap 142: The rear end came off of Henley Gray's vehicle in an unsafe manner.
- Lap 183: Richie Panch fell out with engine failure.
- Lap 192: Caution due to Cale Yarborough and Dave Marcis spinning into the frontstretch, ended on lap 195.
- Finish: Richard Petty was officially declared the winner of the event.

== Standings after the race ==
Pos	Driver	Points	Differential
1	Richard Petty	3329	0
2	Dave Marcis	2756	-573
3	James Hylton	2625	-704
4	Benny Parsons	2525	-804
5	Richard Childress	2493	-836
6 ▲	Darrell Waltrip	2474	-855
7 ▼	Cecil Gordon	2449	-880
8	Elmo Langley	2224	-1105
9	David Pearson	2183	-1146
10	Buddy Baker	2103	-1226
10 ▲	Walter Ballard	2103	-1226

Preceded by 1975 Talladega 500	NASCAR Winston Cup Series season 1975	Succeeded by 1975 Southern 500

Preceded by 1974	Champion Spark Plug 400 races 1975	Succeeded by 1976
