= 1997 Goodwrench Service 400 =

Second race of the 1997 NASCAR Winston Cup Series

Race details
- Race 2 of 32 in the 1997 NASCAR Winston Cup Series
- The 1997 Goodwrench Service 400 program cover, featuring Dale Earnhardt.
- Date: February 23, 1997
- Official name: 32nd Annual Goodwrench Service 400
- Location: Rockingham, North Carolina, North Carolina Speedway
- Course: Permanent racing facility
- Course length: 1.017 miles (1.637 km)
- Distance: 393 laps, 399.681 mi (643.224 km)
- Average speed: 121.371 miles per hour (195.328 km/h)

Pole position
Driver	Mark Martin	Roush Racing
- Time: 23.189

Most laps led
Driver	Dale Jarrett	Robert Yates Racing
- Laps: 323

Winner
No. 24	Jeff Gordon	Hendrick Motorsports

Television in the United States
- Network: TNN
- Announcers: Eli Gold, Buddy Baker, Dick Berggren

Radio in the United States
- Radio: Motor Racing Network

The 1997 Goodwrench Service 400 was the second stock car race of the 1997 NASCAR Winston Cup Series and the 32nd iteration of the event. The race was held on Sunday, February 23, 1997, in Rockingham, North Carolina, at North Carolina Speedway, a 1.017 miles (1.637 km) permanent high-banked racetrack. The race took the scheduled 393 laps to complete. In the final laps of the race, Hendrick Motorsports driver Jeff Gordon would manage to make a late race pass on the dominant driver of the day, Robert Yates Racing driver Dale Jarrett to take his 21st career NASCAR Winston Cup Series victory and his second victory of the season. To fill out the podium, Jarrett and Roush Racing driver Jeff Burton would finish second and third, respectively.

== Background ==
The layout of North Carolina Speedway, the venue where the race was held.

North Carolina Speedway is a 1 mi (1.609 km) D-shaped oval track in Rockingham, North Carolina. It has a 32,000-seat capacity as of 2012. North Carolina Speedway is owned by the International Hot Rod Association (IHRA).

=== Entry list ===
- (R) denotes rookie driver.

#	Driver	Team	Make
1	Morgan Shepherd	Precision Products Racing	Pontiac
2	Rusty Wallace	Penske Racing South	Ford
3	Dale Earnhardt	Richard Childress Racing	Chevrolet
4	Sterling Marlin	Morgan–McClure Motorsports	Chevrolet
5	Terry Labonte	Hendrick Motorsports	Chevrolet
6	Mark Martin	Roush Racing	Ford
7	Geoff Bodine	Geoff Bodine Racing	Ford
8	Hut Stricklin	Stavola Brothers Racing	Ford
9	Lake Speed	Melling Racing	Ford
10	Ricky Rudd	Rudd Performance Motorsports	Ford
11	Brett Bodine	Brett Bodine Racing	Ford
16	Ted Musgrave	Roush Racing	Ford
17	Darrell Waltrip	Darrell Waltrip Motorsports	Chevrolet
18	Bobby Labonte	Joe Gibbs Racing	Pontiac
19	Loy Allen Jr.	TriStar Motorsports	Ford
20	Greg Sacks	Ranier-Walsh Racing	Ford
21	Michael Waltrip	Wood Brothers Racing	Ford
22	Ward Burton	Bill Davis Racing	Pontiac
23	Jimmy Spencer	Haas-Carter Motorsports	Ford
24	Jeff Gordon	Hendrick Motorsports	Chevrolet
25	Ricky Craven	Hendrick Motorsports	Chevrolet
28	Ernie Irvan	Robert Yates Racing	Ford
29	Robert Pressley	Diamond Ridge Motorsports	Chevrolet
30	Johnny Benson Jr.	Bahari Racing	Pontiac
31	Mike Skinner (R)	Richard Childress Racing	Chevrolet
33	Ken Schrader	Andy Petree Racing	Chevrolet
36	Derrike Cope	MB2 Motorsports	Pontiac
37	Jeremy Mayfield	Kranefuss-Haas Racing	Ford
40	Robby Gordon (R)	Team SABCO	Chevrolet
41	Steve Grissom	Larry Hedrick Motorsports	Chevrolet
42	Joe Nemechek	Team SABCO	Chevrolet
43	Bobby Hamilton	Petty Enterprises	Pontiac
44	Kyle Petty	Petty Enterprises	Pontiac
71	Dave Marcis	Marcis Auto Racing	Chevrolet
75	Rick Mast	Butch Mock Motorsports	Ford
77	Bobby Hillin Jr.	Jasper Motorsports	Ford
78	Billy Standridge	Triad Motorsports	Ford
81	Kenny Wallace	FILMAR Racing	Ford
88	Dale Jarrett	Robert Yates Racing	Ford
90	Dick Trickle	Donlavey Racing	Ford
91	Mike Wallace	LJ Racing	Chevrolet
94	Bill Elliott	Bill Elliott Racing	Ford
95	Gary Bradberry	Sadler Brothers Racing	Chevrolet
96	David Green (R)	American Equipment Racing	Chevrolet
97	Chad Little	Mark Rypien Motorsports	Pontiac
98	John Andretti	Cale Yarborough Motorsports	Ford
99	Jeff Burton	Roush Racing	Ford

== Qualifying ==
Qualifying was split into two rounds. The first round was held on Friday, February 21, at 2:00 PM EST. Each driver would have one lap to set a time. During the first round, the top 25 drivers in the round would be guaranteed a starting spot in the race. If a driver was not able to guarantee a spot in the first round, they had the option to scrub their time from the first round and try and run a faster lap time in a second round qualifying run, held on Saturday, February 22, at 11:30 AM EST. As with the first round, each driver would have one lap to set a time. Positions 26-38 would be decided on time, while positions 39-43 would be based on provisionals. Four spots are awarded by the use of provisionals based on owner's points. The fifth is awarded to a past champion who has not otherwise qualified for the race. If no past champion needs the provisional, the next team in the owner points will be awarded a provisional.

Mark Martin, driving for Roush Racing, would win the pole, setting a time of 23.189 and an average speed of 157.885 miles per hour (254.091 km/h).

Four drivers would fail to qualify: Chad Little, Billy Standridge, Mike Wallace, and Gary Bradberry.

=== Full qualifying results ===
Pos.	#	Driver	Team	Make	Time	Speed
1	6	Mark Martin	Roush Racing	Ford	23.189	157.885
2	18	Bobby Labonte	Joe Gibbs Racing	Pontiac	23.395	156.495
3	88	Dale Jarrett	Robert Yates Racing	Ford	23.398	156.475
4	24	Jeff Gordon	Hendrick Motorsports	Chevrolet	23.446	156.155
5	7	Geoff Bodine	Geoff Bodine Racing	Ford	23.462	156.048
6	33	Ken Schrader	Andy Petree Racing	Chevrolet	23.480	155.928
7	41	Steve Grissom	Larry Hedrick Motorsports	Chevrolet	23.488	155.875
8	25	Ricky Craven	Hendrick Motorsports	Chevrolet	23.508	155.743
9	11	Brett Bodine	Brett Bodine Racing	Ford	23.538	155.544
10	10	Ricky Rudd	Rudd Performance Motorsports	Ford	23.542	155.518
11	22	Ward Burton	Bill Davis Racing	Pontiac	23.548	155.478
12	31	Mike Skinner (R)	Richard Childress Racing	Chevrolet	23.557	155.419
13	81	Kenny Wallace	FILMAR Racing	Ford	23.558	155.412
14	96	David Green (R)	American Equipment Racing	Chevrolet	23.594	155.175
15	5	Terry Labonte	Hendrick Motorsports	Chevrolet	23.606	155.096
16	1	Morgan Shepherd	Precision Products Racing	Pontiac	23.612	155.057
17	99	Jeff Burton	Roush Racing	Ford	23.619	155.011
18	29	Robert Pressley	Diamond Ridge Motorsports	Chevrolet	23.619	155.011
19	43	Bobby Hamilton	Petty Enterprises	Pontiac	23.654	154.781
20	44	Kyle Petty	Petty Enterprises	Pontiac	23.659	154.749
21	30	Johnny Benson Jr.	Bahari Racing	Pontiac	23.663	154.723
22	9	Lake Speed	Melling Racing	Ford	23.663	154.723
23	2	Rusty Wallace	Penske Racing South	Ford	23.669	154.683
24	37	Jeremy Mayfield	Kranefuss-Haas Racing	Ford	23.694	154.520
25	98	John Andretti	Cale Yarborough Motorsports	Ford	23.697	154.501
26	36	Derrike Cope	MB2 Motorsports	Pontiac	23.709	154.422
27	3	Dale Earnhardt	Richard Childress Racing	Chevrolet	23.726	154.312
28	16	Ted Musgrave	Roush Racing	Ford	23.729	154.292
29	8	Hut Stricklin	Stavola Brothers Racing	Ford	23.747	154.175
30	17	Darrell Waltrip	Darrell Waltrip Motorsports	Chevrolet	23.767	154.056
31	77	Bobby Hillin Jr.	Jasper Motorsports	Ford	23.774	154.000
32	28	Ernie Irvan	Robert Yates Racing	Ford	23.775	153.994
33	42	Joe Nemechek	Team SABCO	Chevrolet	23.800	153.832
34	71	Dave Marcis	Marcis Auto Racing	Chevrolet	23.811	153.761
35	4	Sterling Marlin	Morgan–McClure Motorsports	Chevrolet	23.817	153.722
36	20	Greg Sacks	Ranier-Walsh Racing	Ford	23.817	153.722
37	90	Dick Trickle	Donlavey Racing	Ford	23.837	153.593
38	75	Rick Mast	Butch Mock Motorsports	Ford	23.887	153.272
Provisionals
39	21	Michael Waltrip	Wood Brothers Racing	Ford	24.145	151.634
40	23	Jimmy Spencer	Travis Carter Enterprises	Ford	23.940	152.932
41	40	Robby Gordon (R)	Team SABCO	Chevrolet	23.870	153.381
42	19	Loy Allen Jr.	TriStar Motorsports	Ford	24.457	149.699
Champion's Provisional
43	94	Bill Elliott	Bill Elliott Racing	Ford	23.828	153.651
Failed to qualify
44	97	Chad Little	Mark Rypien Motorsports	Pontiac	23.934	152.971
45	78	Billy Standridge	Triad Motorsports	Ford	24.014	152.461
46	91	Mike Wallace	LJ Racing	Chevrolet	24.079	152.050
47	95	Gary Bradberry	Sadler Brothers Racing	Chevrolet	24.283	150.772
Official starting lineup

== Race results ==
Fin	St	#	Driver	Team	Make	Laps	Led	Status	Pts	Winnings
1	4	24	Jeff Gordon	Hendrick Motorsports	Chevrolet	393	43	running	180	$93,115
2	3	88	Dale Jarrett	Robert Yates Racing	Ford	393	323	running	180	$68,760
3	17	99	Jeff Burton	Roush Racing	Ford	393	1	running	170	$42,260
4	10	10	Ricky Rudd	Rudd Performance Motorsports	Ford	393	0	running	160	$39,210
5	8	25	Ricky Craven	Hendrick Motorsports	Chevrolet	393	0	running	155	$35,050
6	23	2	Rusty Wallace	Penske Racing South	Ford	393	0	running	150	$35,325
7	15	5	Terry Labonte	Hendrick Motorsports	Chevrolet	393	0	running	146	$40,525
8	5	7	Geoff Bodine	Geoff Bodine Racing	Ford	393	0	running	142	$32,025
9	32	28	Ernie Irvan	Robert Yates Racing	Ford	393	3	running	143	$36,325
10	16	1	Morgan Shepherd	Precision Products Racing	Pontiac	393	0	running	134	$31,575
11	27	3	Dale Earnhardt	Richard Childress Racing	Chevrolet	393	0	running	130	$32,000
12	28	16	Ted Musgrave	Roush Racing	Ford	392	0	running	127	$26,600
13	1	6	Mark Martin	Roush Racing	Ford	392	22	running	129	$31,800
14	2	18	Bobby Labonte	Joe Gibbs Racing	Pontiac	392	0	running	121	$30,150
15	22	9	Lake Speed	Melling Racing	Ford	392	0	running	118	$27,550
16	24	37	Jeremy Mayfield	Kranefuss-Haas Racing	Ford	392	0	running	115	$18,500
17	9	11	Brett Bodine	Brett Bodine Racing	Ford	392	0	running	112	$25,100
18	6	33	Ken Schrader	Andy Petree Racing	Chevrolet	392	0	running	109	$24,800
19	37	90	Dick Trickle	Donlavey Racing	Ford	392	0	running	106	$17,450
20	35	4	Sterling Marlin	Morgan–McClure Motorsports	Chevrolet	392	0	running	103	$32,150
21	38	75	Rick Mast	Butch Mock Motorsports	Ford	392	0	running	100	$23,900
22	43	94	Bill Elliott	Bill Elliott Racing	Ford	392	0	running	97	$25,700
23	11	22	Ward Burton	Bill Davis Racing	Pontiac	391	0	running	94	$16,450
24	7	41	Steve Grissom	Larry Hedrick Motorsports	Chevrolet	391	0	running	91	$23,250
25	12	31	Mike Skinner (R)	Richard Childress Racing	Chevrolet	391	0	running	88	$14,200
26	39	21	Michael Waltrip	Wood Brothers Racing	Ford	390	0	running	85	$22,940
27	21	30	Johnny Benson Jr.	Bahari Racing	Pontiac	390	0	running	82	$22,740
28	19	43	Bobby Hamilton	Petty Enterprises	Pontiac	390	0	running	79	$27,690
29	20	44	Kyle Petty	Petty Enterprises	Pontiac	389	0	running	76	$12,515
30	34	71	Dave Marcis	Marcis Auto Racing	Chevrolet	389	0	running	73	$15,465
31	26	36	Derrike Cope	MB2 Motorsports	Pontiac	388	0	running	70	$12,265
32	30	17	Darrell Waltrip	Darrell Waltrip Motorsports	Chevrolet	388	0	running	67	$14,715
33	41	40	Robby Gordon (R)	Team SABCO	Chevrolet	388	0	running	64	$19,640
34	25	98	John Andretti	Cale Yarborough Motorsports	Ford	388	0	running	61	$19,015
35	33	42	Joe Nemechek	Team SABCO	Chevrolet	387	0	running	58	$11,915
36	29	8	Hut Stricklin	Stavola Brothers Racing	Ford	379	0	running	55	$18,840
37	18	29	Robert Pressley	Diamond Ridge Motorsports	Chevrolet	334	0	crash	52	$11,800
38	14	96	David Green (R)	American Equipment Racing	Chevrolet	303	1	running	54	$11,730
39	36	20	Greg Sacks	Ranier-Walsh Racing	Ford	271	0	engine	46	$11,730
40	40	23	Jimmy Spencer	Travis Carter Enterprises	Ford	264	0	overheating	43	$19,730
41	13	81	Kenny Wallace	FILMAR Racing	Ford	180	0	engine	40	$18,730
42	31	77	Bobby Hillin Jr.	Jasper Motorsports	Ford	136	0	engine	37	$11,730
43	42	19	Loy Allen Jr.	TriStar Motorsports	Ford	68	0	clutch	34	$11,730
Official race results

Previous race: 1997 Daytona 500	NASCAR Winston Cup Series; 1997 season	Next race: 1997 Pontiac Excitement 400
