= 1997 TranSouth Financial 400 =

Fifth race of the 1997 NASCAR Winston Cup Series

Race details
- Race 5 of 32 in the 1997 NASCAR Winston Cup Series
- The 1997 TranSouth Financial 400 program cover, featuring Darrell Waltrip.
- Date: March 23, 1997
- Location: Darlington, South Carolina, Darlington Raceway
- Course: Permanent racing facility
- Course length: 1.366 miles (2.198 km)
- Distance: 293 laps, 400.238 mi (644.12 km)
- Average speed: 121.162 miles per hour (194.991 km/h)

Pole position
Driver	Dale Jarrett	Robert Yates Racing
- Time: 28.742

Most laps led
Driver	Dale Jarrett	Robert Yates Racing
- Laps: 171

Winner
No. 88	Dale Jarrett	Robert Yates Racing

Television in the United States
- Network: ESPN
- Announcers: Bob Jenkins, Ned Jarrett, Benny Parsons

Radio in the United States
- Radio: Motor Racing Network

The 1997 TranSouth Financial 400 was the fifth stock car race of the 1997 NASCAR Winston Cup Series and the 41st iteration of the event. The race was held on Sunday, March 23, 1997, in Darlington, South Carolina, at Darlington Raceway, a 1.366 miles (2.198 km) permanent egg-shaped oval racetrack. The race took the scheduled 293 laps to complete. In the final laps of the race, Robert Yates Racing driver Dale Jarrett would fiercely defend his lead against Roush Racing driver Ted Musgrave to take his tenth career NASCAR Winston Cup Series victory, his second victory of the season, and his second consecutive victory. To fill out the top three, Musgrave and Hendrick Motorsports driver Jeff Gordon would finish second and third, respectively.

== Background ==
The layout of Darlington Raceway, the venue where the race was held.

Darlington Raceway is a race track built for NASCAR racing located near Darlington, South Carolina. It is nicknamed "The Lady in Black" and "The Track Too Tough to Tame" by many NASCAR fans and drivers and advertised as "A NASCAR Tradition." It is of a unique, somewhat egg-shaped design, an oval with the ends of very different configurations, a condition which supposedly arose from the proximity of one end of the track to a minnow pond the owner refused to relocate. This situation makes it very challenging for the crews to set up their cars' handling in a way that is effective at both ends.

=== Entry list ===
- (R) denotes rookie driver.

#	Driver	Team	Make
1	Morgan Shepherd	Precision Products Racing	Pontiac
2	Rusty Wallace	Penske Racing South	Ford
3	Dale Earnhardt	Richard Childress Racing	Chevrolet
4	Sterling Marlin	Morgan–McClure Motorsports	Chevrolet
5	Terry Labonte	Hendrick Motorsports	Chevrolet
6	Mark Martin	Roush Racing	Ford
7	Geoff Bodine	Mattei Motorsports	Ford
8	Hut Stricklin	Stavola Brothers Racing	Ford
9	Lake Speed	Melling Racing	Ford
10	Ricky Rudd	Rudd Performance Motorsports	Ford
11	Brett Bodine	Brett Bodine Racing	Ford
16	Ted Musgrave	Roush Racing	Ford
17	Darrell Waltrip	Darrell Waltrip Motorsports	Chevrolet
18	Bobby Labonte	Joe Gibbs Racing	Pontiac
19	Gary Bradberry	TriStar Motorsports	Ford
20	Greg Sacks	Ranier-Walsh Racing	Ford
21	Michael Waltrip	Wood Brothers Racing	Ford
22	Ward Burton	Bill Davis Racing	Pontiac
23	Jimmy Spencer	Haas-Carter Motorsports	Ford
24	Jeff Gordon	Hendrick Motorsports	Chevrolet
25	Ricky Craven	Hendrick Motorsports	Chevrolet
28	Ernie Irvan	Robert Yates Racing	Ford
29	Robert Pressley	Diamond Ridge Motorsports	Chevrolet
30	Johnny Benson Jr.	Bahari Racing	Pontiac
31	Mike Skinner (R)	Richard Childress Racing	Chevrolet
33	Ken Schrader	Andy Petree Racing	Chevrolet
36	Derrike Cope	MB2 Motorsports	Pontiac
37	Jeremy Mayfield	Kranefuss-Haas Racing	Ford
40	Robby Gordon (R)	Team SABCO	Chevrolet
41	Steve Grissom	Larry Hedrick Motorsports	Chevrolet
42	Joe Nemechek*	Team SABCO	Chevrolet
43	Bobby Hamilton	Petty Enterprises	Pontiac
44	Kyle Petty	Petty Enterprises	Pontiac
71	Dave Marcis	Marcis Auto Racing	Chevrolet
75	Rick Mast	Butch Mock Motorsports	Ford
77	Bobby Hillin Jr.	Jasper Motorsports	Ford
78	Billy Standridge	Triad Motorsports	Ford
81	Kenny Wallace	FILMAR Racing	Ford
88	Dale Jarrett	Robert Yates Racing	Ford
90	Dick Trickle	Donlavey Racing	Ford
91	Mike Wallace	LJ Racing	Chevrolet
94	Bill Elliott	Bill Elliott Racing	Ford
96	David Green (R)	American Equipment Racing	Chevrolet
97	Chad Little	Mark Rypien Motorsports	Pontiac
98	John Andretti	Cale Yarborough Motorsports	Ford
99	Jeff Burton	Roush Racing	Ford

*Replaced by Phil Parsons in order for Joe Nemechek to mourn his brother John Nemechek, who had died in a racing accident.

== Qualifying ==
Qualifying was split into two rounds. The first round was held on Friday, March 21, at 3:00 PM EST. Each driver would have one lap to set a time. During the first round, the top 25 drivers in the round would be guaranteed a starting spot in the race. If a driver was not able to guarantee a spot in the first round, they had the option to scrub their time from the first round and try and run a faster lap time in a second round qualifying run, held on Saturday, March 22, at 11:30 AM EST. As with the first round, each driver would have one lap to set a time. Positions 26-38 would be decided on time, while positions 39-43 would be based on provisionals. Four spots are awarded by the use of provisionals based on owner's points. The fifth is awarded to a past champion who has not otherwise qualified for the race. If no past champion needs the provisional, the next team in the owner points will be awarded a provisional.

Dale Jarrett, driving for Robert Yates Racing, would win the pole, setting a time of 28.742 and an average speed of 171.095 miles per hour (275.351 km/h).

Three drivers would fail to qualify: Dick Trickle, Billy Standridge, and Steve Grissom.

=== Full qualifying results ===
Pos.	#	Driver	Team	Make	Time	Speed
1	88	Dale Jarrett	Robert Yates Racing	Ford	28.742	171.095
2	25	Ricky Craven	Hendrick Motorsports	Chevrolet	28.750	171.047
3	18	Bobby Labonte	Joe Gibbs Racing	Pontiac	28.773	170.910
4	7	Geoff Bodine	Geoff Bodine Racing	Ford	28.801	170.744
5	6	Mark Martin	Roush Racing	Ford	28.831	170.566
6	99	Jeff Burton	Roush Racing	Ford	28.897	170.177
7	8	Hut Stricklin	Stavola Brothers Racing	Ford	28.928	169.994
8	28	Ernie Irvan	Robert Yates Racing	Ford	28.946	169.889
9	4	Sterling Marlin	Morgan–McClure Motorsports	Chevrolet	28.949	169.871
10	24	Jeff Gordon	Hendrick Motorsports	Chevrolet	28.961	169.801
11	9	Lake Speed	Melling Racing	Ford	28.980	169.689
12	5	Terry Labonte	Hendrick Motorsports	Chevrolet	28.993	169.613
13	33	Ken Schrader	Andy Petree Racing	Chevrolet	29.002	169.561
14	19	Gary Bradberry	TriStar Motorsports	Ford	29.042	169.327
15	2	Rusty Wallace	Penske Racing South	Ford	29.063	169.205
16	10	Ricky Rudd	Rudd Performance Motorsports	Ford	29.094	169.025
17	91	Mike Wallace	LJ Racing	Chevrolet	29.130	168.816
18	94	Bill Elliott	Bill Elliott Racing	Ford	29.134	168.792
19	37	Jeremy Mayfield	Kranefuss-Haas Racing	Ford	29.135	168.787
20	71	Dave Marcis	Marcis Auto Racing	Chevrolet	29.140	168.758
21	16	Ted Musgrave	Roush Racing	Ford	29.142	168.746
22	96	David Green (R)	American Equipment Racing	Chevrolet	29.145	168.729
23	1	Morgan Shepherd	Precision Products Racing	Pontiac	29.155	168.671
24	20	Greg Sacks	Ranier-Walsh Racing	Ford	29.155	168.671
25	36	Derrike Cope	MB2 Motorsports	Pontiac	29.158	168.654
26	23	Jimmy Spencer	Travis Carter Enterprises	Ford	29.176	168.549
27	21	Michael Waltrip	Wood Brothers Racing	Ford	29.191	168.463
28	44	Kyle Petty	Petty Enterprises	Pontiac	29.210	168.353
29	42	Phil Parsons	Team SABCO	Chevrolet	29.211	168.348
30	81	Kenny Wallace	FILMAR Racing	Ford	29.234	168.215
31	11	Brett Bodine	Brett Bodine Racing	Ford	29.239	168.186
32	97	Chad Little	Mark Rypien Motorsports	Pontiac	29.251	168.117
33	98	John Andretti	Cale Yarborough Motorsports	Ford	29.268	168.020
34	31	Mike Skinner (R)	Richard Childress Racing	Chevrolet	29.276	167.974
35	29	Robert Pressley	Diamond Ridge Motorsports	Chevrolet	29.287	167.911
36	30	Johnny Benson Jr.	Bahari Racing	Pontiac	29.289	167.899
37	77	Bobby Hillin Jr.	Jasper Motorsports	Ford	29.330	167.665
38	40	Robby Gordon (R)	Team SABCO	Chevrolet	29.343	167.590
Provisionals
39	43	Bobby Hamilton	Petty Enterprises	Pontiac	-*	-*
40	22	Ward Burton	Bill Elliott Racing	Pontiac	-*	-*
41	17	Darrell Waltrip	Darrell Waltrip Motorsports	Chevrolet	-*	-*
42	75	Rick Mast	Butch Mock Motorsports	Ford	-*	-*
43	3	Dale Earnhardt	Richard Childress Racing	Chevrolet	-*	-*
Failed to qualify
44	90	Dick Trickle	Donlavey Racing	Ford	-*	-*
45	78	Billy Standridge	Triad Motorsports	Ford	-*	-*
46	41	Steve Grissom	Larry Hedrick Motorsports	Chevrolet	-*	-*
Official qualifying results

*Time not available.

== Race results ==
Fin	St	#	Driver	Team	Make	Laps	Led	Status	Pts	Winnings
1	1	88	Dale Jarrett	Robert Yates Racing	Ford	293	171	running	185	$142,860
2	21	16	Ted Musgrave	Roush Racing	Ford	293	0	running	170	$54,330
3	10	24	Jeff Gordon	Hendrick Motorsports	Chevrolet	293	16	running	170	$56,240
4	6	99	Jeff Burton	Roush Racing	Ford	293	49	running	165	$34,420
5	3	18	Bobby Labonte	Joe Gibbs Racing	Pontiac	293	0	running	155	$38,275
6	15	2	Rusty Wallace	Penske Racing South	Ford	293	0	running	150	$32,825
7	27	21	Michael Waltrip	Wood Brothers Racing	Ford	293	0	running	146	$26,545
8	13	33	Ken Schrader	Andy Petree Racing	Chevrolet	293	0	running	142	$26,815
9	4	7	Geoff Bodine	Geoff Bodine Racing	Ford	293	0	running	138	$25,210
10	36	30	Johnny Benson Jr.	Bahari Racing	Pontiac	293	0	running	134	$28,805
11	41	17	Darrell Waltrip	Darrell Waltrip Motorsports	Chevrolet	293	0	running	130	$24,150
12	23	1	Morgan Shepherd	Precision Products Racing	Pontiac	293	0	running	127	$23,820
13	12	5	Terry Labonte	Hendrick Motorsports	Chevrolet	292	0	running	124	$34,235
14	30	81	Kenny Wallace	FILMAR Racing	Ford	292	0	running	121	$23,230
15	43	3	Dale Earnhardt	Richard Childress Racing	Chevrolet	292	0	running	118	$28,625
16	18	94	Bill Elliott	Bill Elliott Racing	Ford	292	0	running	115	$22,755
17	19	37	Jeremy Mayfield	Kranefuss-Haas Racing	Ford	292	0	running	112	$15,500
18	40	22	Ward Burton	Bill Elliott Racing	Pontiac	292	0	running	109	$15,265
19	42	75	Rick Mast	Butch Mock Motorsports	Ford	292	0	running	106	$22,020
20	25	36	Derrike Cope	MB2 Motorsports	Pontiac	292	0	running	103	$13,890
21	8	28	Ernie Irvan	Robert Yates Racing	Ford	291	36	running	105	$28,070
22	26	23	Jimmy Spencer	Travis Carter Enterprises	Ford	291	0	running	97	$21,500
23	16	10	Ricky Rudd	Rudd Performance Motorsports	Ford	291	0	running	94	$26,055
24	5	6	Mark Martin	Roush Racing	Ford	291	0	running	91	$21,135
25	33	98	John Andretti	Cale Yarborough Motorsports	Ford	291	0	running	88	$21,165
26	7	8	Hut Stricklin	Stavola Brothers Racing	Ford	291	6	running	90	$20,700
27	32	97	Chad Little	Mark Rypien Motorsports	Pontiac	290	0	running	82	$10,610
28	20	71	Dave Marcis	Marcis Auto Racing	Chevrolet	290	0	running	79	$13,550
29	24	20	Greg Sacks	Ranier-Walsh Racing	Ford	289	0	running	76	$10,440
30	34	31	Mike Skinner (R)	Richard Childress Racing	Chevrolet	289	8	running	78	$10,405
31	29	42	Phil Parsons	Team SABCO	Chevrolet	289	0	running	70	$12,845
32	9	4	Sterling Marlin	Morgan–McClure Motorsports	Chevrolet	278	0	running	67	$26,310
33	28	44	Kyle Petty	Petty Enterprises	Pontiac	264	0	running	64	$10,220
34	38	40	Robby Gordon (R)	Team SABCO	Chevrolet	232	0	crash	61	$17,185
35	31	11	Brett Bodine	Brett Bodine Racing	Ford	224	0	oil leak	58	$17,150
36	11	9	Lake Speed	Melling Racing	Ford	188	0	transmission	55	$17,115
37	39	43	Bobby Hamilton	Petty Enterprises	Pontiac	183	0	oil pump	52	$25,101
38	14	19	Gary Bradberry	TriStar Motorsports	Ford	169	0	running	49	$9,954
39	35	29	Robert Pressley	Diamond Ridge Motorsports	Chevrolet	161	7	crash	51	$9,954
40	2	25	Ricky Craven	Hendrick Motorsports	Chevrolet	160	0	crash	43	$17,100
41	22	96	David Green (R)	American Equipment Racing	Chevrolet	69	0	crash	40	$9,954
42	37	77	Bobby Hillin Jr.	Jasper Motorsports	Ford	62	0	oil leak	37	$9,954
43	17	91	Mike Wallace	LJ Racing	Chevrolet	26	0	crash	34	$9,954
Official race results

Previous race: 1997 Primestar 500	NASCAR Winston Cup Series; 1997 season	Next race: 1997 Interstate Batteries 500
