= 1997 Primestar 500 =

Fourth race of the 1997 NASCAR Winston Cup Series

Race details
- Race 4 of 32 in the 1997 NASCAR Winston Cup Series
- The 1997 Primestar 500 program cover, featuring Ted Musgrave, Bobby Labonte, and Terry Labonte. Artwork by NASCAR artist Sam Bass.
- Date: March 9, 1997
- Location: Hampton, Georgia, Atlanta Motor Speedway
- Course: Permanent racing facility
- Course length: 1.522 miles (2.449 km)
- Distance: 328 laps, 499.216 mi (803.41 km)
- Average speed: 132.731 miles per hour (213.610 km/h)

Pole position
Driver	Robby Gordon	Team SABCO
- Time: 29.378

Most laps led
Driver	Dale Jarrett	Robert Yates Racing
- Laps: 253

Winner
No. 88	Dale Jarrett	Robert Yates Racing

Television in the United States
- Network: ABC
- Announcers: Bob Jenkins, Benny Parsons

Radio in the United States
- Radio: Performance Racing Network

The 1997 Primestar 500 was the fourth stock car race of the 1997 NASCAR Winston Cup Series and the 38th iteration of the event. The race was held on Sunday, March 9, 1997, in Hampton, Georgia at Atlanta Motor Speedway, a 1.522 miles (2.449 km) permanent asphalt quad-oval intermediate speedway. The race took the scheduled 328 laps to complete. At race's end, Robert Yates Racing driver Dale Jarrett would dominate the majority of the race to take his ninth career NASCAR Winston Cup Series victory and his first of the season. To fill out the top three, Robert Yates Racing driver Ernie Irvan and Precision Products Racing driver Morgan Shepherd would finish second and third, respectively.

The race was marred by a crash involving Larry Hedrick Motorsports driver Steve Grissom on lap 284. On the track's backstretch, Jimmy Spencer would spin in front of oncoming cars, causing Grissom to spin and fellow driver and rookie Mike Skinner to hit Spencer and become airborne. Grissom would proceed to spin towards an opening on the inside backstretch wall at over 180 miles per hour (290 km/h), eventually hitting the wall violently. Grissom's car would proceed to flip wildly, with the rear axle completely torn from the car and with the fuel cell ruptured, fuel would spill onto the track. Grissom was eventually determined to be OK from the accident, with Grissom only suffering a "skinned ankle" according to Grissom himself.

== Background ==
The layout of Atlanta Motor Speedway, the circuit where the race was held.

Atlanta Motor Speedway is a 1.54-mile race track in Hampton, Georgia, United States, 20 miles (32 km) south of Atlanta. It has annually hosted NASCAR Winston Cup Series stock car races since its inauguration in 1960.

The venue was bought by Speedway Motorsports in 1990. In 1994, 46 condominiums were built over the northeastern side of the track. In 1997, to standardize the track with Speedway Motorsports' other two intermediate ovals, the entire track was almost completely rebuilt. The frontstretch and backstretch were swapped, and the configuration of the track was changed from oval to quad-oval, with a new official length of 1.54-mile (2.48 km) where before it was 1.522-mile (2.449 km). The project made the track one of the fastest on the NASCAR circuit.

=== Entry list ===
- (R) - denotes rookie driver.

#	Driver	Team	Make
1	Morgan Shepherd	Precision Products Racing	Pontiac
2	Rusty Wallace	Penske Racing South	Ford
3	Dale Earnhardt	Richard Childress Racing	Chevrolet
4	Sterling Marlin	Morgan–McClure Motorsports	Chevrolet
5	Terry Labonte	Hendrick Motorsports	Chevrolet
6	Mark Martin	Roush Racing	Ford
7	Geoff Bodine	Mattei Motorsports	Ford
8	Hut Stricklin	Stavola Brothers Racing	Ford
08	Mike Miller	Miller Racing	Chevrolet
9	Lake Speed	Melling Racing	Ford
10	Ricky Rudd	Rudd Performance Motorsports	Ford
11	Brett Bodine	Brett Bodine Racing	Ford
16	Ted Musgrave	Roush Racing	Ford
17	Darrell Waltrip	Darrell Waltrip Motorsports	Chevrolet
18	Bobby Labonte	Joe Gibbs Racing	Pontiac
19	Gary Bradberry	TriStar Motorsports	Ford
20	Greg Sacks	Ranier-Walsh Racing	Ford
21	Michael Waltrip	Wood Brothers Racing	Ford
22	Ward Burton	Bill Davis Racing	Pontiac
23	Jimmy Spencer	Haas-Carter Motorsports	Ford
24	Jeff Gordon	Hendrick Motorsports	Chevrolet
25	Ricky Craven	Hendrick Motorsports	Chevrolet
28	Ernie Irvan	Robert Yates Racing	Ford
29	Robert Pressley	Diamond Ridge Motorsports	Chevrolet
30	Johnny Benson Jr.	Bahari Racing	Pontiac
31	Mike Skinner (R)	Richard Childress Racing	Chevrolet
33	Ken Schrader	Andy Petree Racing	Chevrolet
36	Derrike Cope	MB2 Motorsports	Pontiac
37	Jeremy Mayfield	Kranefuss-Haas Racing	Ford
40	Robby Gordon (R)	Team SABCO	Chevrolet
41	Steve Grissom	Larry Hedrick Motorsports	Chevrolet
42	Joe Nemechek	Team SABCO	Chevrolet
43	Bobby Hamilton	Petty Enterprises	Pontiac
44	Kyle Petty	Petty Enterprises	Pontiac
46	Wally Dallenbach Jr.	Team SABCO	Chevrolet
71	Dave Marcis	Marcis Auto Racing	Chevrolet
75	Rick Mast	Butch Mock Motorsports	Ford
77	Bobby Hillin Jr.	Jasper Motorsports	Ford
78	Billy Standridge	Triad Motorsports	Ford
81	Kenny Wallace	FILMAR Racing	Ford
88	Dale Jarrett	Robert Yates Racing	Ford
90	Dick Trickle	Donlavey Racing	Ford
91	Mike Wallace	LJ Racing	Chevrolet
94	Bill Elliott	Bill Elliott Racing	Ford
95	Ed Berrier	Sadler Brothers Racing	Chevrolet
96	David Green (R)	American Equipment Racing	Chevrolet
97	Chad Little	Mark Rypien Motorsports	Pontiac
98	John Andretti	Cale Yarborough Motorsports	Ford
99	Jeff Burton	Roush Racing	Ford

== Qualifying ==
Qualifying was split into two rounds. The first round was held on Friday, March 7, at 12:30 PM EST. Each driver would have one lap to set a time. During the first round, the top 25 drivers in the round would be guaranteed a starting spot in the race. If a driver was not able to guarantee a spot in the first round, they had the option to scrub their time from the first round and try and run a faster lap time in a second round qualifying run, held on Saturday, March 8, at 11:00 AM EST. As with the first round, each driver would have one lap to set a time. Positions 26-38 would be decided on time, while positions 39-43 would be based on provisionals. Four spots are awarded by the use of provisionals based on owner's points. The fifth is awarded to a past champion who has not otherwise qualified for the race. If no past champion needs the provisional, the next team in the owner points will be awarded a provisional.

Robby Gordon, driving for Team SABCO, would win the pole, setting a time of 29.378 and an average speed of 186.507 miles per hour (300.154 km/h).

Seven drivers would fail to qualify: Robert Pressley, Derrike Cope, Bobby Hillin Jr., Wally Dallenbach Jr., Ed Berrier, Dave Marcis, and Mike Miller.

=== Full qualifying results ===
Pos.	#	Driver	Team	Make	Time	Speed
1	40	Robby Gordon (R)	Team SABCO	Chevrolet	29.378	186.507
2	6	Mark Martin	Roush Racing	Ford	29.471	185.918
3	17	Darrell Waltrip	Darrell Waltrip Motorsports	Chevrolet	29.564	185.334
4	90	Dick Trickle	Donlavey Racing	Ford	29.607	185.064
5	8	Hut Stricklin	Stavola Brothers Racing	Ford	29.620	184.983
6	9	Lake Speed	Melling Racing	Ford	29.640	184.858
7	16	Ted Musgrave	Roush Racing	Ford	29.655	184.765
8	7	Geoff Bodine	Geoff Bodine Racing	Ford	29.670	184.671
9	88	Dale Jarrett	Robert Yates Racing	Ford	29.675	184.640
10	81	Kenny Wallace	FILMAR Racing	Ford	29.710	184.423
11	78	Billy Standridge	Triad Motorsports	Ford	29.731	184.292
12	23	Jimmy Spencer	Travis Carter Enterprises	Ford	29.735	184.268
13	25	Ricky Craven	Hendrick Motorsports	Chevrolet	29.747	184.193
14	37	Jeremy Mayfield	Kranefuss-Haas Racing	Ford	29.759	184.119
15	94	Bill Elliott	Bill Elliott Racing	Ford	29.761	184.107
16	75	Rick Mast	Butch Mock Motorsports	Ford	29.764	184.088
17	28	Ernie Irvan	Robert Yates Racing	Ford	29.772	184.039
18	43	Bobby Hamilton	Petty Enterprises	Pontiac	29.784	183.965
19	96	David Green (R)	American Equipment Racing	Chevrolet	29.802	183.853
20	4	Sterling Marlin	Morgan–McClure Motorsports	Chevrolet	29.806	183.829
21	1	Morgan Shepherd	Precision Products Racing	Pontiac	29.812	183.792
22	5	Terry Labonte	Hendrick Motorsports	Chevrolet	29.813	183.786
23	24	Jeff Gordon	Hendrick Motorsports	Chevrolet	29.830	183.681
24	31	Mike Skinner (R)	Richard Childress Racing	Chevrolet	29.835	183.650
25	10	Ricky Rudd	Rudd Performance Motorsports	Ford	29.837	183.638
26	3	Dale Earnhardt	Richard Childress Racing	Chevrolet	29.828	183.693
27	99	Jeff Burton	Roush Racing	Ford	29.840	183.619
28	20	Greg Sacks	Ranier-Walsh Racing	Ford	29.860	183.496
29	18	Bobby Labonte	Joe Gibbs Racing	Pontiac	29.885	183.343
30	44	Kyle Petty	Petty Enterprises	Pontiac	29.889	183.318
31	21	Michael Waltrip	Wood Brothers Racing	Ford	29.905	183.220
32	97	Chad Little	Mark Rypien Motorsports	Pontiac	29.906	183.214
33	98	John Andretti	Cale Yarborough Motorsports	Ford	29.928	183.079
34	19	Gary Bradberry	TriStar Motorsports	Ford	29.945	182.975
35	33	Ken Schrader	Andy Petree Racing	Chevrolet	29.960	182.884
36	22	Ward Burton	Bill Davis Racing	Pontiac	29.968	182.835
37	91	Mike Wallace	LJ Racing	Chevrolet	29.974	182.798
38	2	Rusty Wallace	Penske Racing South	Ford	29.978	182.774
Provisionals
39	41	Steve Grissom	Larry Hedrick Motorsports	Chevrolet	30.383	180.338
40	30	Johnny Benson Jr.	Bahari Racing	Pontiac	30.028	182.470
41	11	Brett Bodine	Brett Bodine Racing	Ford	29.982	182.750
42	42	Joe Nemechek	Team SABCO	Chevrolet	30.347	180.552
Failed to qualify
43	29	Robert Pressley	Diamond Ridge Motorsports	Chevrolet	-*	-*
44	36	Derrike Cope	MB2 Motorsports	Pontiac	-*	-*
45	77	Bobby Hillin Jr.	Jasper Motorsports	Ford	-*	-*
46	46	Wally Dallenbach Jr.	Team SABCO	Chevrolet	-*	-*
47	95	Ed Berrier	Sadler Brothers Racing	Chevrolet	-*	-*
48	71	Dave Marcis	Marcis Auto Racing	Chevrolet	-*	-*
49	08	Mike Miller	Miller Racing	Chevrolet	30.531	179.463
Official qualifying results

*Time not available.

== Race results ==
Fin	St	#	Driver	Team	Make	Laps	Led	Status	Pts	Winnings
1	9	88	Dale Jarrett	Robert Yates Racing	Ford	328	253	running	185	$137,650
2	17	28	Ernie Irvan	Robert Yates Racing	Ford	328	10	running	175	$73,000
3	21	1	Morgan Shepherd	Precision Products Racing	Pontiac	328	10	running	170	$59,400
4	29	18	Bobby Labonte	Joe Gibbs Racing	Pontiac	328	3	running	165	$46,000
5	27	99	Jeff Burton	Roush Racing	Ford	328	0	running	155	$41,000
6	2	6	Mark Martin	Roush Racing	Ford	328	9	running	155	$45,900
7	31	21	Michael Waltrip	Wood Brothers Racing	Ford	328	0	running	146	$34,825
8	26	3	Dale Earnhardt	Richard Childress Racing	Chevrolet	328	0	running	142	$40,975
9	22	5	Terry Labonte	Hendrick Motorsports	Chevrolet	328	1	running	143	$43,275
10	18	43	Bobby Hamilton	Petty Enterprises	Pontiac	328	0	running	134	$41,375
11	40	30	Johnny Benson Jr.	Bahari Racing	Pontiac	328	0	running	130	$33,925
12	36	22	Ward Burton	Bill Davis Racing	Pontiac	327	0	running	127	$24,425
13	30	44	Kyle Petty	Petty Enterprises	Pontiac	327	0	running	124	$19,905
14	1	40	Robby Gordon (R)	Team SABCO	Chevrolet	327	42	running	126	$42,935
15	33	98	John Andretti	Cale Yarborough Motorsports	Ford	327	0	running	118	$31,805
16	3	17	Darrell Waltrip	Darrell Waltrip Motorsports	Chevrolet	327	0	running	115	$30,495
17	16	75	Rick Mast	Butch Mock Motorsports	Ford	327	0	running	112	$30,185
18	41	11	Brett Bodine	Brett Bodine Racing	Ford	326	0	running	109	$29,965
19	32	97	Chad Little	Mark Rypien Motorsports	Pontiac	324	0	running	106	$18,435
20	8	7	Geoff Bodine	Geoff Bodine Racing	Ford	324	0	running	103	$32,035
21	24	31	Mike Skinner (R)	Richard Childress Racing	Chevrolet	323	0	running	100	$18,925
22	6	9	Lake Speed	Melling Racing	Ford	323	0	running	97	$29,365
23	20	4	Sterling Marlin	Morgan–McClure Motorsports	Chevrolet	323	0	running	94	$34,755
24	19	96	David Green (R)	American Equipment Racing	Chevrolet	323	0	running	91	$18,620
25	35	33	Ken Schrader	Andy Petree Racing	Chevrolet	321	0	running	88	$29,165
26	37	91	Mike Wallace	LJ Racing	Chevrolet	311	0	running	85	$18,460
27	28	20	Greg Sacks	Ranier-Walsh Racing	Ford	305	0	running	82	$18,350
28	4	90	Dick Trickle	Donlavey Racing	Ford	304	0	engine	79	$21,575
29	10	81	Kenny Wallace	FILMAR Racing	Ford	299	0	crash	76	$28,335
30	25	10	Ricky Rudd	Rudd Performance Motorsports	Ford	293	0	running	73	$32,975
31	38	2	Rusty Wallace	Penske Racing South	Ford	284	0	crash	70	v34,915
32	12	23	Jimmy Spencer	Travis Carter Enterprises	Ford	282	0	crash	67	$27,955
33	39	41	Steve Grissom	Larry Hedrick Motorsports	Chevrolet	281	0	crash	64	$28,760
34	7	16	Ted Musgrave	Roush Racing	Ford	267	0	crash	61	$27,725
35	13	25	Ricky Craven	Hendrick Motorsports	Chevrolet	266	0	crash	58	$27,190
36	11	78	Billy Standridge	Triad Motorsports	Ford	261	0	engine	55	$17,665
37	14	37	Jeremy Mayfield	Kranefuss-Haas Racing	Ford	260	0	engine	52	$17,650
38	15	94	Bill Elliott	Bill Elliott Racing	Ford	253	0	engine	49	$24,570
39	42	42	Joe Nemechek	Team SABCO	Chevrolet	252	0	crash	46	$17,570
40	34	19	Gary Bradberry	TriStar Motorsports	Ford	252	0	crash	43	$17,570
41	5	8	Hut Stricklin	Stavola Brothers Racing	Ford	226	0	engine	40	$24,570
42	23	24	Jeff Gordon	Hendrick Motorsports	Chevrolet	59	0	engine	37	$34,770
Official race results

== Media ==
=== Television ===
The race was aired live on ABC in the United States. Bob Jenkins and 1984 race winner Benny Parsons called the race from the broadcast booth. Jerry Punch, Bill Weber and Jack Arute handled pit road for the television side.

ABC
Booth announcers		Pit reporters
Lap-by-lap	Color-commentators	Pit reporters
Bob Jenkins	Benny Parsons	Jerry Punch; Bill Weber; Jack Arute

Previous race: 1997 Pontiac Excitement 400	NASCAR Winston Cup Series; 1997 season	Next race: 1997 TranSouth Financial 400
