= 1997 Pontiac Excitement 400 =

Third race of the 1997 NASCAR Winston Cup Series

Race details
- Race 3 of 32 in the 1997 NASCAR Winston Cup Series
- The 1997 Pontiac Excitement 400 program cover.
- Date: March 2, 1997
- Official name: 43rd Annual Pontiac Excitement 400
- Location: Richmond, Virginia, Richmond International Raceway
- Course: Permanent racing facility
- Course length: 0.75 miles (1.21 km)
- Distance: 400 laps, 300 mi (482.803 km)
- Average speed: 108.499 miles per hour (174.612 km/h)

Pole position
Driver	Terry Labonte	Hendrick Motorsports
- Time: Set by 1996 owner's points

Most laps led
Driver	Dale Jarrett	Robert Yates Racing
- Laps: 172

Winner
No. 2	Rusty Wallace	Penske Racing South

Television in the United States
- Network: ESPN
- Announcers: Bob Jenkins, Benny Parsons, Ned Jarrett

Radio in the United States
- Radio: Motor Racing Network

The 1997 Pontiac Excitement 400 was the third stock car race of the 1997 NASCAR Winston Cup Series and the 32nd iteration of the event. The race was held on Sunday, March 2, 1997, in Richmond, Virginia, at Richmond International Raceway, a 0.75 miles (1.21 km) D-shaped oval. The race took the scheduled 400 laps to complete. In a controversial victory, Penske Racing South driver Rusty Wallace would manage to hold off the field on the final restart with three to go, scoring his 47th career NASCAR Winston Cup Series victory and his only victory of the season. To fill out the top three, Geoff Bodine Racing driver Geoff Bodine and Robert Yates Racing driver Dale Jarrett would finish second and third, respectively.

In post-race technical inspection, Wallace's engine was found to have failed to "meet compression ratio specifications" according to NASCAR technical inspector Kevin Triplett. At the time, the engine compression ratio was 14:1. On Monday, March 3, NASCAR would run another test. The official test results came to 14.001:1, which while slightly over, was within the guidelines and would allow Wallace to keep his victory.

== Background ==
The layout of Richmond International Raceway, the venue where the race was at.

Richmond International Raceway (RIR) is a 3/4-mile (1.2 km), D-shaped, asphalt race track located just outside Richmond, Virginia in Henrico County. Known as "America's premier short track".

=== Entry list ===
- (R) denotes rookie driver.

#	Driver	Team	Make
1	Morgan Shepherd	Precision Products Racing	Pontiac
2	Rusty Wallace	Penske Racing South	Ford
3	Dale Earnhardt	Richard Childress Racing	Chevrolet
4	Sterling Marlin	Morgan–McClure Motorsports	Chevrolet
5	Terry Labonte	Hendrick Motorsports	Chevrolet
6	Mark Martin	Roush Racing	Ford
7	Geoff Bodine	Mattei Motorsports	Ford
8	Hut Stricklin	Stavola Brothers Racing	Ford
9	Lake Speed	Melling Racing	Ford
10	Ricky Rudd	Rudd Performance Motorsports	Ford
11	Brett Bodine	Brett Bodine Racing	Ford
16	Ted Musgrave	Roush Racing	Ford
17	Darrell Waltrip	Darrell Waltrip Motorsports	Chevrolet
18	Bobby Labonte	Joe Gibbs Racing	Pontiac
19	Loy Allen Jr.	TriStar Motorsports	Ford
20	Greg Sacks	Ranier-Walsh Racing	Ford
21	Michael Waltrip	Wood Brothers Racing	Ford
22	Ward Burton	Bill Davis Racing	Pontiac
23	Jimmy Spencer	Haas-Carter Motorsports	Ford
24	Jeff Gordon	Hendrick Motorsports	Chevrolet
25	Ricky Craven	Hendrick Motorsports	Chevrolet
28	Ernie Irvan	Robert Yates Racing	Ford
29	Robert Pressley	Diamond Ridge Motorsports	Chevrolet
30	Johnny Benson Jr.	Bahari Racing	Pontiac
31	Mike Skinner (R)	Richard Childress Racing	Chevrolet
33	Ken Schrader	Andy Petree Racing	Chevrolet
36	Derrike Cope	MB2 Motorsports	Pontiac
37	Jeremy Mayfield	Kranefuss-Haas Racing	Ford
40	Robby Gordon (R)	Team SABCO	Chevrolet
41	Steve Grissom	Larry Hedrick Motorsports	Chevrolet
42	Joe Nemechek	Team SABCO	Chevrolet
43	Bobby Hamilton	Petty Enterprises	Pontiac
44	Kyle Petty	Petty Enterprises	Pontiac
71	Dave Marcis	Marcis Auto Racing	Chevrolet
75	Rick Mast	Butch Mock Motorsports	Ford
77	Bobby Hillin Jr.	Jasper Motorsports	Ford
78	Billy Standridge	Triad Motorsports	Ford
81	Kenny Wallace	FILMAR Racing	Ford
88	Dale Jarrett	Robert Yates Racing	Ford
90	Dick Trickle	Donlavey Racing	Ford
91	Mike Wallace	LJ Racing	Chevrolet
94	Bill Elliott	Bill Elliott Racing	Ford
96	David Green (R)	American Equipment Racing	Chevrolet
97	Chad Little	Mark Rypien Motorsports	Pontiac
98	John Andretti	Cale Yarborough Motorsports	Ford
99	Jeff Burton	Roush Racing	Ford

== Qualifying ==
Qualifying was originally scheduled to be held on Friday, February 28. However, due to rain, qualifying was cancelled. In 1997, NASCAR rules mandated that the top 33 spots were based on the 1996 owner's points, since the race was in the first four races of the season. The final 10 spots were based on postmarks on the official entry list. As a result, Terry Labonte, driving for Hendrick Motorsports, would win the pole.

Three drivers would fail to qualify: Billy Standridge, Greg Sacks, and Mike Wallace.

=== Full starting lineup ===
Pos.	#	Driver	Team	Make
1	5	Terry Labonte	Hendrick Motorsports	Chevrolet
2	24	Jeff Gordon	Hendrick Motorsports	Chevrolet
3	88	Dale Jarrett	Robert Yates Racing	Ford
4	3	Dale Earnhardt	Richard Childress Racing	Chevrolet
5	6	Mark Martin	Roush Racing	Ford
6	10	Ricky Rudd	Rudd Performance Motorsports	Ford
7	2	Rusty Wallace	Penske Racing South	Ford
8	4	Sterling Marlin	Morgan–McClure Motorsports	Chevrolet
9	43	Bobby Hamilton	Petty Enterprises	Pontiac
10	28	Ernie Irvan	Robert Yates Racing	Ford
11	18	Bobby Labonte	Joe Gibbs Racing	Pontiac
12	25	Ricky Craven	Hendrick Motorsports	Chevrolet
13	99	Jeff Burton	Roush Racing	Ford
14	21	Michael Waltrip	Wood Brothers Racing	Ford
15	23	Jimmy Spencer	Travis Carter Enterprises	Ford
16	16	Ted Musgrave	Roush Racing	Ford
17	94	Bill Elliott	Bill Elliott Racing	Ford
18	7	Geoff Bodine	Geoff Bodine Racing	Ford
19	1	Morgan Shepherd	Precision Products Racing	Pontiac
20	75	Rick Mast	Butch Mock Motorsports	Ford
21	41	Steve Grissom	Larry Hedrick Motorsports	Chevrolet
22	98	John Andretti	Cale Yarborough Motorsports	Ford
23	30	Johnny Benson Jr.	Bahari Racing	Pontiac
24	40	Robby Gordon (R)	Team SABCO	Chevrolet
25	8	Hut Stricklin	Stavola Brothers Racing	Ford
26	9	Lake Speed	Melling Racing	Ford
27	11	Brett Bodine	Brett Bodine Racing	Ford
28	33	Ken Schrader	Andy Petree Racing	Chevrolet
29	81	Kenny Wallace	FILMAR Racing	Ford
30	17	Darrell Waltrip	Darrell Waltrip Motorsports	Chevrolet
31	22	Ward Burton	Bill Davis Racing	Pontiac
32	42	Joe Nemechek	Team SABCO	Chevrolet
33	37	Jeremy Mayfield	Kranefuss-Haas Racing	Ford
34	71	Dave Marcis	Marcis Auto Racing	Chevrolet
35	77	Bobby Hillin Jr.	Jasper Motorsports	Ford
36	31	Mike Skinner (R)	Richard Childress Racing	Chevrolet
37	44	Kyle Petty	Petty Enterprises	Pontiac
38	36	Derrike Cope	MB2 Motorsports	Pontiac
39	29	Robert Pressley	Diamond Ridge Motorsports	Chevrolet
40	90	Dick Trickle	Donlavey Racing	Ford
41	96	David Green (R)	American Equipment Racing	Chevrolet
42	97	Chad Little	Mark Rypien Motorsports	Pontiac
43	19	Gary Bradberry	TriStar Motorsports	Ford
Failed to qualify
44	78	Billy Standridge	Triad Motorsports	Ford
45	20	Greg Sacks	Ranier-Walsh Racing	Ford
46	91	Mike Wallace	LJ Racing	Chevrolet
Official starting lineup

== Race results ==
Fin	St	#	Driver	Team	Make	Laps	Led	Status	Pts	Winnings
1	7	2	Rusty Wallace	Penske Racing South	Ford	400	135	running	180	$86,775
2	18	7	Geoff Bodine	Geoff Bodine Racing	Ford	400	18	running	175	$56,875
3	3	88	Dale Jarrett	Robert Yates Racing	Ford	400	172	running	175	$50,750
4	2	24	Jeff Gordon	Hendrick Motorsports	Chevrolet	399	65	running	165	$46,200
5	9	43	Bobby Hamilton	Petty Enterprises	Pontiac	399	1	running	160	$35,595
6	6	10	Ricky Rudd	Rudd Performance Motorsports	Ford	399	0	running	150	$30,770
7	1	5	Terry Labonte	Hendrick Motorsports	Chevrolet	399	0	running	146	$35,845
8	11	18	Bobby Labonte	Joe Gibbs Racing	Pontiac	399	1	running	147	$28,945
9	23	30	Johnny Benson Jr.	Bahari Racing	Pontiac	399	0	running	138	$25,745
10	37	44	Kyle Petty	Petty Enterprises	Pontiac	398	0	running	134	$18,545
11	21	41	Steve Grissom	Larry Hedrick Motorsports	Chevrolet	398	0	running	130	$24,345
12	26	9	Lake Speed	Melling Racing	Ford	398	0	running	127	$24,045
13	5	6	Mark Martin	Roush Racing	Ford	398	0	running	124	$23,870
14	12	25	Ricky Craven	Hendrick Motorsports	Chevrolet	398	0	running	121	$23,670
15	17	94	Bill Elliott	Bill Elliott Racing	Ford	398	8	running	123	$25,330
16	30	17	Darrell Waltrip	Darrell Waltrip Motorsports	Chevrolet	398	0	running	115	$16,215
17	33	37	Jeremy Mayfield	Kranefuss-Haas Racing	Ford	398	0	running	112	$15,415
18	20	75	Rick Mast	Butch Mock Motorsports	Ford	398	0	running	109	$22,265
19	8	4	Sterling Marlin	Morgan–McClure Motorsports	Chevrolet	397	0	running	106	$27,540
20	16	16	Ted Musgrave	Roush Racing	Ford	397	0	running	103	$24,565
21	39	29	Robert Pressley	Diamond Ridge Motorsports	Chevrolet	397	0	running	100	$16,965
22	15	23	Jimmy Spencer	Travis Carter Enterprises	Ford	397	0	running	97	$21,840
23	27	11	Brett Bodine	Brett Bodine Racing	Ford	397	0	running	94	$21,665
24	31	22	Ward Burton	Bill Davis Racing	Pontiac	397	0	running	91	$14,540
25	4	3	Dale Earnhardt	Richard Childress Racing	Chevrolet	397	0	running	88	$27,940
26	36	31	Mike Skinner (R)	Richard Childress Racing	Chevrolet	397	0	running	85	$12,265
27	14	21	Michael Waltrip	Wood Brothers Racing	Ford	396	0	running	82	$21,340
28	24	40	Robby Gordon (R)	Team SABCO	Chevrolet	396	0	running	79	$21,215
29	40	90	Dick Trickle	Donlavey Racing	Ford	395	0	running	76	$14,190
30	38	36	Derrike Cope	MB2 Motorsports	Pontiac	395	0	running	73	$11,160
31	22	98	John Andretti	Cale Yarborough Motorsports	Ford	395	0	running	70	$20,615
32	25	8	Hut Stricklin	Stavola Brothers Racing	Ford	395	0	running	67	$18,090
33	41	96	David Green (R)	American Equipment Racing	Chevrolet	395	0	running	64	$11,075
34	42	97	Chad Little	Mark Rypien Motorsports	Pontiac	395	0	running	61	$11,065
35	28	33	Ken Schrader	Andy Petree Racing	Chevrolet	393	0	running	58	$18,065
36	10	28	Ernie Irvan	Robert Yates Racing	Ford	391	0	crash	55	$26,065
37	34	71	Dave Marcis	Marcis Auto Racing	Chevrolet	391	0	running	52	$11,065
38	43	19	Gary Bradberry	TriStar Motorsports	Ford	389	0	running	49	$11,065
39	32	42	Joe Nemechek	Team SABCO	Chevrolet	380	0	running	46	$11,065
40	29	81	Kenny Wallace	FILMAR Racing	Ford	376	0	engine	43	$18,065
41	35	77	Bobby Hillin Jr.	Jasper Motorsports	Ford	336	0	rear end	40	$11,065
42	13	99	Jeff Burton	Roush Racing	Ford	248	0	running	37	$19,065
43	19	1	Morgan Shepherd	Precision Products Racing	Pontiac	131	0	engine	34	$11,965
Official race results

Previous race: 1997 Goodwrench Service 400	NASCAR Winston Cup Series; 1997 season	Next race: 1997 Primestar 500
