= 1998 Pepsi 400 =

NASCAR race at Daytona in 1998

Race details
- Race 30 of 33 in the 1998 NASCAR Winston Cup Series
- 1998 Pepsi 400 program, showing the original planned date of July 4, 1998
- Date: October 17, 1998
- Location: Daytona International Speedway in Daytona Beach, Florida
- Course: Permanent racing facility
- Course length: 2.5 miles (4.0 km)
- Distance: 160 laps, 400 mi (643.738 km)
- Weather: Temperatures descending as low as 72 °F (22 °C); wind speeds approaching 13 miles per hour (21 km/h)
- Average speed: 144.549 miles per hour (232.629 km/h)

Pole position
Driver	Bobby Labonte	Joe Gibbs Racing
- Time: 46.485

Most laps led
Driver	Jeff Gordon	Hendrick Motorsports
- Laps: 49

Winner
No. 24	Jeff Gordon	Hendrick Motorsports

Television in the United States
- Network: TNN
- Announcers: Eli Gold, Dick Berggren and Buddy Baker

The 1998 Pepsi 400 was a NASCAR Winston Cup Series stock car race held on October 17, 1998, at Daytona International Speedway in Daytona Beach, Florida. Originally scheduled to be held on the Fourth of July, the race was postponed until the fall due to widespread wildfires in central Florida; it was the first superspeedway race to be held at night.

Contested over 160 laps, it was the thirtieth race of the 1998 season. Jeff Gordon of Hendrick Motorsports took his eleventh win of the season, while Bobby Labonte finished second and Mike Skinner finished third. Gordon retained his point lead on the way to his third Winston Cup championship title.

== Report ==
=== Background ===
Daytona International Speedway, where the race was held.

Daytona International Speedway is one of six superspeedways to hold NASCAR races, the others being Michigan International Speedway, California Speedway, Indianapolis Motor Speedway, Pocono Raceway and Talladega Superspeedway. The standard track at Daytona International Speedway is a four-turn superspeedway that is 2.5 miles (4.0 km) long. The track's turns are banked at 31 degrees, while the front stretch, the location of the finish line, is banked at 18 degrees. John Andretti was the defending race winner. The event was the fifth of five night races held during the 1998 Winston Cup Series season.

The 1998 Pepsi 400 was originally scheduled to be run on July 4, 1998, as the seventeenth race of the 33-event Winston Cup Series schedule. It was the first superspeedway race, and first NASCAR event held at Daytona, to be run at night following the installation of Musco lighting at the Daytona International Speedway; it was also scheduled to be broadcast live on CBS, the first stock car event to be televised live on primetime network television.

During the days leading up to the scheduled start of practice at 3pm, Thursday, July 2, 1998, concerns rose on account of the massive wildfire outbreak that was underway in central Florida; thousands of people were forced to evacuate the area, and Interstate 95, the primary north–south thoroughfare through the region, was closed. At 10am on July 2, NASCAR announced that the race was being postponed; while July 25 was an open date, the decision was made to reschedule the race for October 17, to allow additional time for the wildfires to be controlled. At the time of the postponement, the race was sold out; this was the first time the summer race at Daytona International Speedway had achieved sellout status.

The rescheduling meant that the race would not be televised on CBS, as the network did not want to compete against Fox's broadcast of Game 1 of the Major League Baseball World Series, also scheduled for October 17. On July 21, CBS Sports moved the race to their cable channel The Nashville Network, which would broadcast the rescheduled race live in its entirety. The race would be produced by World Sports Enterprises, which is also part of CBS Sports.

Prior to the race, Jeff Gordon led the Drivers' Championship with 4632 points, and Mark Martin was in second with 4344 points. Dale Jarrett was third in the Drivers' Championship with 4098 points, Rusty Wallace was fourth with 3883 points, and Jeff Burton was in fifth with 3805 points. In the Manufacturers' Championship, Chevrolet was tied with Ford for the lead with 216 points each; Pontiac followed in third with 138 points.

=== Practice and qualifying ===
Practice and first round qualifying was held on Thursday, October 15, 1998; Bobby Labonte led pre-qualifying practice with a lap time of 46.722 seconds. Five Ford teams, those of drivers Chad Little, Jimmy Spencer, Rich Bickle, Dick Trickle and Billy Standridge, ran Thunderbird-bodied race cars, instead of the standard Taurus ran at most 1998 Winston Cup Series races, believing the Thunderbird to have an aerodynamic advantage at the restrictor plate racetracks. ARCA driver Randal Ritter's car failed to pass inspection due to extreme irregularities in its construction, and the team withdrew before practice began.

Bobby Labonte posted the fastest time in first round qualifying, a lap of 46.485 seconds (193.611 miles per hour (311.587 km/h)), winning the Bud Pole Award; Jeff Burton was second fastest. Jeremy Mayfield qualified 25th, the last car to qualify for the race on the first day of time trials. Second round qualifying was held during the afternoon on Friday, October 16; the fastest car in the session, placing 26th on the starting grid, was the No. 07 Chevrolet driven by Dan Pardus, qualifying at a speed of 189.945 miles per hour (305.687 km/h). Kenny Wallace and Rich Bickle also improved their qualifying times and made the starting field for the race; Bickle was the slowest car to qualify on time, at 188.608 miles per hour (303.535 km/h). Bobby Hamilton, Jimmy Spencer, Ricky Craven, Johnny Benson Jr., Ricky Rudd, Kyle Petty and Darrell Waltrip received provisional starting positions; Rick Mast, Dick Trickle, Rick Wilson, Robert Pressley and Gary Bradberry failed to make the field for the event.

Ernie Irvan, 14th in Winston Cup Series points entering the event, opted to sit out the majority of practice and qualifying, having suffered injuries in a crash the previous week at Talladega Superspeedway; Ricky Craven practiced and qualified the No. 36 Pontiac for Irvan. Irvan did run a few laps during practice on Friday night, October 16; the "Happy Hour" practice session began at 7:30pm and was scheduled to run for two and a half hours, but was delayed during its duration for an hour and 45 minutes, as the track was dried following afternoon thunderstorms. Bobby Hamilton posted the fastest speed in the session, 191.345 miles per hour (307.940 km/h). Johnny Benson's car suffered a hood failure during the session, the hood flying off of the car.

=== Race ===
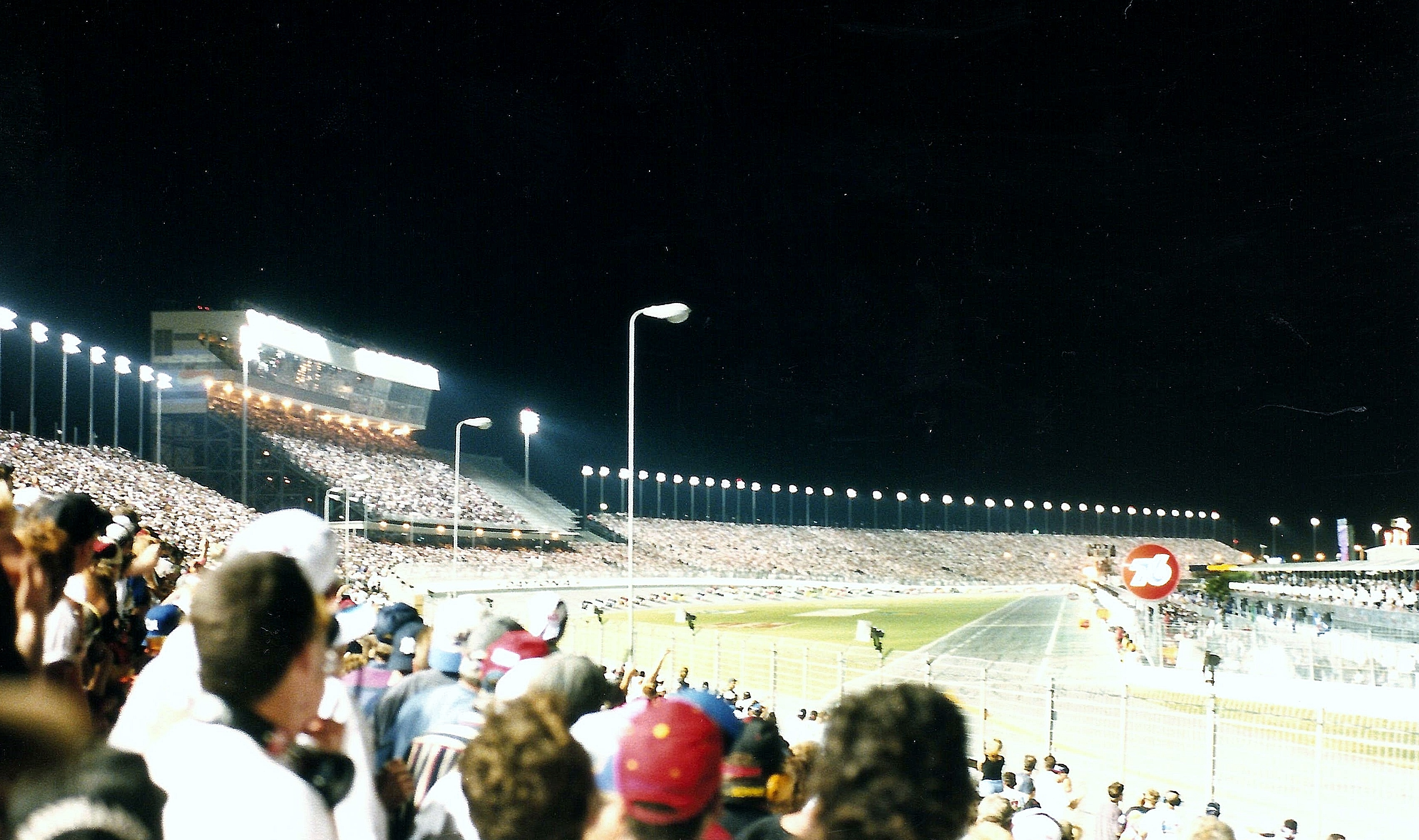
The 1998 Pepsi 400 was the first race held at Daytona International Speedway under the lights.

The race was held starting at 8pm on Saturday, October 17, 1998. Ernie Irvan dropped to the rear of the field prior to the start of the race, due to a driver change; Ricky Craven had qualified the car. Although Bobby Labonte started on pole, Dale Jarrett, who had started third, led the first lap of the race; Dale Earnhardt took the lead on lap two and held it through the first caution period of the race, for rain, for three laps starting at lap 13. A large crash occurred on lap 32; initiated by Kevin Lepage losing control of his car in turn two, the wreck collected eleven cars, including Hut Stricklin, Geoff Bodine and three-time Winston Cup champion Darrell Waltrip; Earnhardt lost the lead during pit stops under caution to Rusty Wallace, with Dave Marcis pitting a lap later than the leaders to pick up five bonus points for leading a lap. Lepage suffered a fractured shoulder in a fall exiting his car.

The race resumed on lap 39; after Earnhardt took the lead for one lap at lap 44 Jarrett assumed the lead and held it for the next 37 laps, until pit stops shuffled the field and saw Earnhardt, Jeff Gordon, and Bobby Labonte swapping the lead among themselves. Jimmy Spencer and Jeremy Mayfield each also led a single lap during the long green-flag period that ended on lap 107 when Dan Pardus hit the wall in turn two. Gordon had been leading at the time of the caution; he lost the lead to rookie Kenny Irwin Jr. during pit stops, and Irwin retained the lead after the resumption of racing on lap 110, leading 15 laps in total until being passed by Gordon on lap 123 on account of having a flat tire, just before the caution came out once again for a rain shower.

The brief four-lap caution saw Gordon retaining the lead; he continued to pace the field as Irwin, on lap 141, hit the Thunderbird of Chad Little, setting off a nine-car accident that brought out a caution. Gordon continued to lead on the restart, and on lap 155, five laps from the finish of the event, rain began to fall once again; the caution flag was thrown, then the red flag, stopping the race to allow the track to be dried and the event to finish under green.

After a 37-minute red flag period, the race resumed; Gordon was able to hold off his challengers over the final three laps to take his eleventh win of the season. In the midst of the final sprint, Chad Little ended up getting turned from behind by Jimmy Spencer while in a three wide battle exiting turn 4 and crashed hard into the inside wall, failing to make it to the stripe and finishing 20th. Gordon set an average speed of 144.549 miles per hour (232.629 km/h) while leading 49 of the race's 160 laps. Gordon received $184,325 in purse money. Bobby Labonte finished second; Mike Skinner was third, while Jeremy Mayfield and Rusty Wallace finished in the top five. The fastest lap of the race was set by Dale Earnhardt, at 191.383 miles per hour (308.001 km/h).

Gordon, who had entered the race with the points lead, extended it to 358 points over Mark Martin; nobody would challenge Gordon over the remainder of the season, and he would go on to win his third Winston Cup Series championship; he was the youngest driver to accomplish the feat. The race took two hours, forty-six minutes, and two seconds to complete, and the margin of victory was 0.176 seconds.

=== Statistical notes ===
The 1998 Pepsi 400 was the only Winston Cup Series start by Dan Pardus, and the last by Billy Standridge. It was also the last race for which Rick Wilson attempted to qualify.

The Firecracker 400 would return to its traditional July date in 1999, and has been held at night on the first Saturday in July from 1999 to 2019, except in 2015, when NBC Sports requested a Sunday night race in order to not conflict with the Macy's 4th of July Fireworks broadcast. The 2014 and 2019 races were held on Sunday mornings because of inclement weather on Saturday night, and in both cases the race was shortened by further weather on Sunday after official status. In 2020, the date was changed to the Saturday a week before Labor Day (fourth Saturday, except when the Cook Out 500 at Darlington Raceway is held on September 6, when the Firecracker is held on August 29, the fifth Saturday in August) in order to ensure the Firecracker 400 ended the regular season, and the Cook Out 500 started the NASCAR postseason.

== Results ==
=== Qualifying ===
No.	Driver	Team	Manufacturer	Time	Speed	Grid
18	Bobby Labonte	Joe Gibbs Racing	Pontiac	46.485	193.611	1
99	Jeff Burton	Roush Racing	Ford	46.710	192.678	2
88	Dale Jarrett	Robert Yates Racing	Ford	46.873	192.008	3
5	Terry Labonte	Hendrick Motorsports	Chevrolet	46.884	191.963	4
3	Dale Earnhardt	Richard Childress Racing	Chevrolet	46.928	191.783	5
6	Mark Martin	Roush Racing	Ford	46.957	191.665	6
2	Rusty Wallace	Penske Racing South	Ford	46.990	191.530	7
24	Jeff Gordon	Hendrick Motorsports	Chevrolet	47.003	191.477	8
31	Mike Skinner	Richard Childress Racing	Chevrolet	47.008	191.457	9
55	Hut Stricklin	Andy Petree Racing	Chevrolet	47.012	191.440	10
28	Kenny Irwin Jr. #	Robert Yates Racing	Ford	47.072	191.196	11
22	Ward Burton	Bill Davis Racing	Pontiac	47.096	191.099	12
30	Derrike Cope	Bahari Racing	Pontiac	47.097	191.095	13
43	John Andretti	Petty Enterprises	Pontiac	47.143	190.909	14
1	Steve Park #	Dale Earnhardt, Inc.	Chevrolet	47.146	190.896	15
33	Ken Schrader	Andy Petree Racing	Chevrolet	47.148	190.888	16
40	Sterling Marlin	Team Sabco	Chevrolet	47.170	190.799	17
47	Billy Standridge	Standridge Motorsports	T-Bird	47.228	190.565	18
11	Brett Bodine	Brett Bodine Racing	Ford	47.268	190.404	19
97	Chad Little	Roush Racing	T-Bird	47.300	190.275	20
7	Geoff Bodine	Geoff Bodine Racing	Ford	47.331	190.150	21
16	Kevin Lepage #	Roush Racing	Ford	47.344	190.098	22
91	Andy Hillenburg	LJ Racing	Chevrolet	47.374	189.978	23
96	Steve Grissom	American Equipment Racing	Chevrolet	47.374	189.978	24
12	Jeremy Mayfield	Penske-Kranefuss Racing	Ford	47.447	189.685	25
07	Dan Pardus	Midwest Transit Racing	Chevrolet	47.382	189.946	26‡
42	Joe Nemechek	Team Sabco	Chevrolet	47.455	189.653	27
81	Kenny Wallace	FILMAR Racing	Ford	47.472	189.585	28
21	Michael Waltrip	Wood Brothers Racing	Ford	47.488	189.522	29
71	Dave Marcis	Marcis Auto Racing	Chevrolet	47.532	189.346	30
94	Bill Elliott	Bill Elliott Racing	Ford	47.538	189.322	31
46	Jeff Green	Team Sabco	Chevrolet	47.565	189.215	32
9	Jerry Nadeau #	Melling Racing	Ford	47.568	189.203	33
13	Ted Musgrave	Elliott-Marino Racing	Ford	47.649	188.881	34
50	Wally Dallenbach Jr.	Hendrick Motorsports	Chevrolet	47.692	188.711	35
98	Rich Bickle	Cale Yarborough Motorsports	T-Bird	47.718	188.608	36
4	Bobby Hamilton	Morgan–McClure Motorsports	Chevrolet	Provisional		37
23	Jimmy Spencer	Travis Carter Enterprises	T-Bird	Provisional		38
36	Ricky Craven †	MB2 Motorsports	Pontiac	Provisional		39
26	Johnny Benson Jr.	Roush Racing	Ford	Provisional		40
10	Ricky Rudd	Rudd Performance Motorsports	Ford	Provisional		41
44	Kyle Petty	PE2	Pontiac	Provisional		42
35	Darrell Waltrip	Tyler Jet Motorsports	Pontiac	Past Champion		43
Failed to Qualify
90	Dick Trickle	Donlavey Racing	T-Bird	48.092	187.141	
75	Rick Mast	RahMoc Enterprises	Ford	48.093	187.137	
41	Rick Wilson	Larry Hedrick Motorsports	Chevrolet	48.441	185.793	
77	Robert Pressley	Jasper Motorsports	Ford	48.806	184.404	
78	Gary Bradberry	Triad Motorsports	Ford	48.864	184.185	
68	Randal Ritter	Ritter Racing	Chevrolet	Withdrew		
# Rookie of the Year candidate / † Driver change following qualifying / ‡ Fastest second round qualifier Source:

=== Race results ===
Pos	Grid	No.	Driver	Team	Manufacturer	Laps	Points
1	8	24	Jeff Gordon	Hendrick Motorsports	Chevrolet	160	185^{2}
2	1	18	Bobby Labonte	Joe Gibbs Racing	Pontiac	160	175^{1}
3	9	31	Mike Skinner	Richard Childress Racing	Chevrolet	160	165
4	25	12	Jeremy Mayfield	Penske-Kranefuss Racing	Ford	160	165^{1}
5	7	2	Rusty Wallace	Penske Racing South	Ford	160	160^{1}
6	4	5	Terry Labonte	Hendrick Motorsports	Chevrolet	160	150
7	12	22	Ward Burton	Bill Davis Racing	Pontiac	160	146
8	39†	36	Ernie Irvan	MB2 Motorsports	Pontiac	160	142
9	16	33	Ken Schrader	Andy Petree Racing	Chevrolet	160	138
10	5	3	Dale Earnhardt	Richard Childress Racing	Chevrolet	160	139^{1}
11	37	4	Bobby Hamilton	Morgan–McClure Motorsports	Chevrolet	160	130
12	38	23	Jimmy Spencer	Travis Carter Enterprises	T-Bird	160	132^{1}
13	2	99	Jeff Burton	Roush Racing	Ford	160	124
14	14	43	John Andretti	Petty Enterprises	Pontiac	160	121
15	31	94	Bill Elliott	Bill Elliott Racing	Ford	160	118
16	6	6	Mark Martin	Roush Racing	Ford	160	115
17	27	42	Joe Nemechek	Team Sabco	Chevrolet	160	112
18	17	40	Sterling Marlin	Team Sabco	Chevrolet	160	109
19	33	9	Jerry Nadeau #	Melling Racing	Ford	160	106
20	20	97	Chad Little	Roush Racing	T-Bird	159	103
21	30	71	Dave Marcis	Marcis Auto Racing	Chevrolet	159	105^{1}
22	42	44	Kyle Petty	PE2	Pontiac	159	97
23	3	88	Dale Jarrett	Robert Yates Racing	Ford	159	99^{1}
24	23	91	Andy Hillenburg	LJ Racing	Chevrolet	159	91
25	19	11	Brett Bodine	Brett Bodine Racing	Ford	159	88
26	40	26	Johnny Benson Jr.	Roush Racing	Ford	159	85
27	41	10	Ricky Rudd	Rudd Performance Motorsports	Ford	159	82
28	43	35	Darrell Waltrip	Tyler Jet Motorsports	Pontiac	158	79
29	24	96	Steve Grissom	American Equipment Racing	Chevrolet	157	76
30	35	50	Wally Dallenbach Jr.	Hendrick Motorsports	Chevrolet	156	73
31	29	21	Michael Waltrip	Wood Brothers Racing	Ford	144	70
32	11	28	Kenny Irwin Jr. #	Robert Yates Racing	Ford	140	72^{1}
33	15	1	Steve Park #	Dale Earnhardt, Inc.	Chevrolet	139	64
34	34	13	Ted Musgrave	Elliott-Marino Racing	Ford	116	61
35	28	81	Kenny Wallace	FILMAR Racing	Ford	113	58
36	26	07	Dan Pardus	Midwest Transit Racing	Chevrolet	99	55
37	32	46	Jeff Green	Team Sabco	Chevrolet	98	52
38	13	30	Derrike Cope	Bahari Racing	Pontiac	67	49
39	36	98	Rich Bickle	Cale Yarborough Motorsports	T-Bird	58	46
40	22	16	Kevin Lepage #	Roush Racing	Ford	31	43
41	21	7	Geoff Bodine	Geoff Bodine Racing	Ford	31	40
42	10	55	Hut Stricklin	Andy Petree Racing	Chevrolet	31	37
43	18	47	Billy Standridge	Standridge Motorsports	T-Bird	19	34
# Rookie of the Year candidate / † Driver change following qualifying Source:
^{1} Includes five bonus points for leading a lap
^{2} Includes ten bonus points for leading the most laps

Previous race: 1998 Winston 500	Winston Cup Series; 1998 season	Next race: 1998 Dura Lube/Kmart 500
