= 1997 Daytona 500 =

Auto race held at Daytona International Speedway in 1997

Race details
- Race 1 of 32 in the 1997 NASCAR Winston Cup Series season
- 1997 Daytona 500 logo
- Date: February 16, 1997
- Location: Daytona International Speedway; Daytona Beach, Florida, U.S.
- Course: Permanent racing facility 2.5 mi (4.02336 km)
- Distance: 200 laps, 500 mi (804.672 km)
- Weather: Temperatures hovering around 63 °F (17 °C); wind speeds reaching up to 23 miles per hour (37 km/h)
- Average speed: 148.295 miles per hour (238.658 km/h)

Pole position
Driver	Mike Skinner	Richard Childress Racing

Qualifying race winners
Duel 1 Winner	Dale Jarrett	Robert Yates Racing
Duel 2 Winner	Dale Earnhardt	Richard Childress Racing

Most laps led
Driver	Mark Martin	Roush Racing
- Laps: 52

Winner
No. 24	Jeff Gordon	Hendrick Motorsports

Television in the United States
- Network: CBS
- Announcers: Ken Squier, Buddy Baker, and Ned Jarrett
- Nielsen ratings: 8.6/23 (12.8 million viewers)

The 1997 Daytona 500, the 39th running of the event, was held on February 16 at Daytona International Speedway in Daytona Beach, Florida. Consisted of 200 laps and 500 miles, it was the first race of the 1997 Winston Cup season. Mike Skinner, driving the #31 car for Richard Childress Racing, won the pole and Jeff Gordon, driving the #24 Chevrolet for Hendrick Motorsports, won the race. The race was broadcast on television by CBS.

== Race recap ==
=== Notes ===
- Joe Nemechek's car owner Felix Sabates bought the #73 entry of Phil Barkdoll, who had qualified 38th. Nemechek went to the #73 for the 500.
- Remington Arms placed their sponsor logos on the #19 Ford driven by Loy Allen Jr. for TriStar Motorsports after Rick Mast failed to qualify the RahMoc car.
- Robert Pressley's car caught air after he spun on lap 10. The rear of the car lifted so much, the car was temporarily sliding across the track on its nose. The landing was quite hard, so after the crew repaired the car, then Busch Series competitor and future 2-time Camping World Truck Series Champion Todd Bodine hopped in to complete more laps.
- Dale Earnhardt was involved in a crash in a six-way battle for the lead with 12 laps to go, in which his #3 Chevrolet scraped the backstretch wall by itself, then made contact with Dale Jarrett causing Earnhardt's car to roll over. While his car was on its roof, Earnhardt was contacted by Ernie Irvan in the #28 Ford. The hood of Irvan's car detached and sailed into the backstretch grandstand, injuring a few spectators. While sitting in an ambulance after the crash, Earnhardt noticed that his tires were still on the car after the crash, had it taken off the tow truck, and drove it back to pit road. The car was repaired as best as the team could, and Earnhardt was able to return to the race, 5 laps down in 31st.
- The race ended under caution after the Big One occurred on lap 196, involving 13 cars.
- Hendrick Motorsports posted a 1-2-3 finish with Gordon winning the race, Terry Labonte finishing second, and Ricky Craven finishing third. The team used a formation finish as the race ended under the safety car, which was possible at the time.
- At age 25, Jeff Gordon became the youngest Daytona 500 winner ever. Richard Petty had previously been the youngest winner in 1964, when he won the 500 at age 26. Gordon's record was surpassed when Trevor Bayne won the 2011 Daytona 500 at age 20.

=== Results ===
Pos	Grid	Car	Driver	Team	Make	Laps	Laps led	Status
1	6	24	Jeff Gordon	Hendrick Motorsports	Chevrolet	200	40	Running
2	18	5	Terry Labonte	Hendrick Motorsports	Chevrolet	200	0	Running
3	40	25	Ricky Craven	Hendrick Motorsports	Chevrolet	200	0	Running
4	8	94	Bill Elliott (W)	Bill Elliott Racing	Ford	200	30	Running
5	9	4	Sterling Marlin (W)	Morgan-McClure Motorsports	Chevrolet	200	8	Running
6	21	37	Jeremy Mayfield	MK Racing	Ford	200	0	Running
7	11	6	Mark Martin	Roush Racing	Ford	200	52	Running
8	17	22	Ward Burton	Bill Davis Racing	Pontiac	200	0	Running
9	13	10	Ricky Rudd	Rudd Performance Motorsports	Ford	200	0	Running
10	22	17	Darrell Waltrip (W)	Darrell Waltrip Motorsports	Chevrolet	200	0	Running
11	23	99	Jeff Burton	Roush Racing	Ford	200	0	Running
12	1	31	Mike Skinner (R)	Richard Childress Racing	Chevrolet	200	1	Running
13	41	16	Ted Musgrave	Roush Racing	Ford	200	0	Running
14	30	44	Kyle Petty	PE2 Motorsports	Pontiac	200	0	Running
15	39	43	Bobby Hamilton	Petty Enterprises	Pontiac	200	0	Running
16	20	40	Robby Gordon	SABCO Racing	Chevrolet	200	0	Running
17	24	71	Dave Marcis	Marcis Auto Racing	Chevrolet	200	0	Running
18	37	11	Brett Bodine	Brett Bodine Racing	Ford	200	0	Running
19	28	8	Hut Stricklin	Stavola Brothers Racing	Ford	200	0	Running
20	5	28	Ernie Irvan (W)	Robert Yates Racing	Ford	200	13	Running
21	15	18	Bobby Labonte	Joe Gibbs Racing	Pontiac	200	0	Running
22	36	81	Kenny Wallace	FILMAR Racing	Ford	200	0	Running
23	3	88	Dale Jarrett (W)	Robert Yates Racing	Ford	200	0	Running
24	35	9	Lake Speed	Melling Racing	Ford	199	0	Flagged
25	32	98	John Andretti	Cale Yarborough Motorsports	Ford	198	0	Flagged
26	33	19	Loy Allen Jr.	TriStar Motorsports	Ford	198	0	Flagged
27	38	73	Joe Nemechek^{2}	Barkdoll Racing	Chevrolet	196	0	Accident
28	16	30	Johnny Benson	Bahari Racing	Pontiac	195	0	Accident
29	42	1	Morgan Shepherd	Precision Products Racing	Pontiac	195	0	Accident
30	27	90	Dick Trickle	Donlavey Racing	Ford	195	0	Accident
31	4	3	Dale Earnhardt	Richard Childress Racing	Chevrolet	195	48	Flagged
32	12	21	Michael Waltrip	Wood Brothers Racing	Ford	188	5	Flagged
33	10	33	Ken Schrader	Andy Petree Racing	Chevrolet	173	0	Flagged
34	25	7	Geoff Bodine (W)	Geoff Bodine Racing	Ford	148	0	Flagged
35	7	23	Jimmy Spencer	Travis Carter Enterprises	Ford	146	0	Flagged
36	29	36	Derrike Cope (W)	MB2 Motorsports	Pontiac	124	0	Accident
37	34	20	Greg Sacks	Ranier-Walsh Racing	Ford	120	3	Accident
38	31	77	Bobby Hillin Jr.	Jasper Motorsports	Ford	111	0	Engine
39	19	29	Robert Pressley	Diamond Ridge Motorsports	Chevrolet	91	0	Accident
40	2	41	Steve Grissom	Larry Hedrick Motorsports	Chevrolet	88	0	Accident
41	14	2	Rusty Wallace	Penske Racing South	Ford	47	0	Engine
42	26	46	Wally Dallenbach Jr.	SABCO Racing	Chevrolet	32	0	Engine
Failed to Qualify
		75	Rick Mast	Butch Mock Motorsports	Ford			
		97	Chad Little	Mark Rypien Motorsports	Pontiac			
		15	Larry Pearson	Bud Moore Engineering	Ford			
		42	Joe Nemechek^{2}	SABCO Racing	Chevrolet			
		78	Billy Standridge (R)	Triad Motorsports	Ford			
		96	David Green (R)	American Equipment Racing	Chevrolet			
		95	Gary Bradberry (R)	Sadler Brothers Racing	Chevrolet			
		91	Mike Wallace	LJ Racing	Chevrolet			
		0	Delma Cowart	H. L. Waters Racing	Ford			
		84	Norm Benning (R)	Norm Benning Racing	Chevrolet			
"1997 Daytona 500 - Racing-Reference.info".
Notes: 1. After Rick Mast failed to qualify for the Daytona 500, his sponsor Remington Arms signed an agreement to sponsor Loy Allen's entry for the Daytona 500.; 2. After Joe Nemechek failed to qualify for the Daytona 500, his SABCO team reached an agreement to purchase Phil Barkdoll's entry and compete in the Daytona 500 in Barkdoll's car.

== Media ==
=== Television ===
The Daytona 500 was covered by CBS for the nineteenth time in the United States. Ken Squier, two-time NASCAR Cup Series champion Ned Jarrett and 1980 race winner Buddy Baker called the race from the broadcast booth. Mike Joy, Dick Berggren and Ralph Sheheen reported from pit road.

CBS
Booth announcers		Pit reporters
Lap-by-lap	Color-commentators	Pit reporters
Ken Squier	Ned Jarrett; Buddy Baker	Mike Joy; Dick Berggren; Ralph Sheheen

Previous race: 1996 NAPA 500	NASCAR Winston Cup Series; 1997 season	Next race: 1997 Goodwrench Service 400
