= 1997 Winston 500 =

Auto race held at Talladega Superspeedway in 1997

Race details
- Race 10 of 32 in the 1997 NASCAR Winston Cup Series season
- The 1997 Winston 500 program cover, featuring Darrell Waltrip, Dale Jarrett, and Jeff Gordon.
- Date: May 10, 1997
- Official name: Winston 500
- Location: Talladega Superspeedway, Talladega, Alabama
- Course: Permanent racing facility
- Course length: 2.660 miles (4.280 km)
- Distance: 188 laps, 500.1 mi (804.8 km)
- Weather: Temperatures of 71.6 °F (22.0 °C); wind speeds of 6.3 miles per hour (10.1 km/h)
- Average speed: 188.354 miles per hour (303.126 km/h)

Pole position
Driver	John Andretti	Cale Yarborough Motorsports

Most laps led
Driver	Dale Earnhardt	Richard Childress Racing
- Laps: 76

Winner
No. 6	Mark Martin	Roush Racing

Television in the United States
- Network: ESPN
- Announcers: Bob Jenkins; Benny Parsons; Ned Jarrett

The 1997 Winston 500 was a NASCAR Winston Cup Series race that took place on May 10, 1997, at Talladega Superspeedway in Talladega, Alabama. Heavy rain and prior NASCAR commitments forced this race to be rescheduled from April 27, 1997.

This race would be last time that the number 20 would be used on a Winston Cup Series vehicle until Tony Stewart came along and revived the number as a part of Joe Gibbs Racing. Stewart was asked to drive the vehicle just prior to qualifying but had to turn it down due to prior commitments.

== Background ==
The layout of Talladega Superspeedway, the venue where the race was held.

Talladega Superspeedway, originally known as Alabama International Motor Superspeedway (AIMS), is a motorsports complex located north of Talladega, Alabama. It is located on the former Anniston Air Force Base in the small city of Lincoln. The track is a Tri-oval and was constructed by International Speedway Corporation, a business controlled by the France Family, in the 1960s. Talladega is most known for its steep banking and the unique location of the start/finish line - located just past the exit to pit road. The track currently hosts the NASCAR series such as the Sprint Cup Series, Xfinity Series, and the Camping World Truck Series. Talladega Superspeedway is the longest NASCAR oval with a length of 2.66 miles (4.28 km), and the track at its peak had a seating capacity of 175,000 spectators.

== Race report ==
There were 43 American-born drivers in this race. Those who failed to qualify were: Billy Standridge, Mike Wallace, Gary Bradberry, Joe Nemechek, Phil Barkdoll (in his final NASCAR attempt), and Ed Berrier. Geoffrey Bodine finished last due to an engine problem on lap 78 of 188 laps. Mark Martin defeated Dale Earnhardt by 0.150 seconds; ending the caution-free race. This was Martin's second consecutive victory. The aero package allowed for 26 changes in first-place during the race. Bobby Hillin had his best finish of the 1997 season by finishing 20th after qualifying in second place. This race would be the final start for Greg Sacks in the 20 and Robert Pressley in the 29.

John Andretti, driving Cale Yarborough's car, would finish in the top five. This race was actually rain-delayed from its original date, was attempted on Monday, then set back to the Saturday before Mother's Day.

Joe Nemechek ran the #40 car in this race because Robby Gordon had activities for the Indy 500 that were conflicting with the Winston 500.

It took more than two and a half hours for Martin to record his average speed of 188.354 miles per hour (303.126 km/h); one of the fastest average speeds recorded. Despite being twice the distance this race was only 32 minutes longer than the 2017 I Love New York 355 at The Glen. John Andretti earned the pole position of the race with a speed of 193.627 miles per hour (311.612 km/h). This race brought to a close the existence of Harry Ranier's race team.

This race was a restrictor plate race per NASCAR's policy on racing at Talladega and its sister track at Daytona Beach, Florida during that time. Lake Speed's ACE Hardware sponsorship in this race was fabricated so that he would resemble the villain in Fox's made-for-TV movie Steel Chariots.

Mark Martin's race speed record still stands due to this race going caution free; it is unlikely the record will be broken anytime soon since NASCAR has added mandatory stage break cautions to all races (which has since been removed at road courses, but those tracks do not approach the average speeds of superspeedways).

After this race, Labonte would take the championship points away from Dale Jarrett. The total prize purse for this race was $1,317,496 ($2,642,366 when considering inflation); Martin would earn $92,220 ($184,956 when considering inflation).

=== Qualifying ===
Grid	No.	Driver	Manufacturer
1	98	John Andretti	Ford
2	77	Bobby Hillin Jr.	Ford
3	3	Dale Earnhardt	Chevrolet
4	2	Rusty Wallace	Ford
5	31	Mike Skinner	Chevrolet
6	33	Ken Schrader	Chevrolet
7	28	Ernie Irvan	Ford
8	18	Bobby Labonte	Pontiac
9	88	Dale Jarrett	Ford
10	94	Bill Elliott	Ford
11	24	Jeff Gordon	Chevrolet
12	36	Derrike Cope	Pontiac
13	20	Greg Sacks	Ford
14	9	Lake Speed	Ford
15	75	Rick Mast	Ford
16	4	Sterling Marlin	Chevrolet
17	30	Johnny Benson Jr.	Pontiac
18	6	Mark Martin	Ford
19	7	Geoffrey Bodine	Ford
20	23	Jimmy Spencer	Ford

== Results ==
Pos	Grid	No.	Driver	Team	Manufacturer	Laps	Laps led	Status	Points
1	18	6	Mark Martin	Roush Racing	Ford	188	47	Running	180
2	3	3	Dale Earnhardt	Richard Childress Racing	Chevrolet	188	76	Running	180
3	8	18	Bobby Labonte	Joe Gibbs Racing	Pontiac	188	0	Running	165
4	1	98	John Andretti	Cale Yarborough Motorsports	Ford	188	19	Running	165
5	11	24	Jeff Gordon	Hendrick Motorsports	Chevrolet	188	13	Running	160
6	36	5	Terry Labonte	Hendrick Motorsports	Chevrolet	188	0	Running	150
7	20	23	Jimmy Spencer	Travis Carter Enterprises	Ford	188	0	Running	146
8	39	99	Jeff Burton	Roush Racing	Ford	188	13	Running	147
9	17	30	Johnny Benson Jr.	Bahari Racing	Pontiac	188	0	Running	138
10	7	28	Ernie Irvan	Robert Yates Racing	Ford	188	2	Running	139
11	29	10	Ricky Rudd	Rudd Performance Motorsports	Ford	188	0	Running	130
12	6	33	Ken Schrader	Andy Petree Racing	Chevrolet	188	1	Running	132
13	12	36	Derrike Cope	MB2 Motorsports	Pontiac	188	0	Running	124
14	28	21	Michael Waltrip	Wood Brothers Racing	Ford	188	1	Running	126
15	26	90	Dick Trickle	Donlavey Racing	Ford	188	0	Running	118
16	5	31	Mike Skinner	Richard Childress Racing	Chevrolet	187	2	Running	120
17	27	46	Wally Dallenbach Jr.	Team SABCO	Chevrolet	187	0	Running	112
18	10	94	Bill Elliott	Bill Elliott Racing	Ford	187	0	Running	109
19	32	40	Joe Nemechek	Team SABCO	Chevrolet	187	0	Running	106
20	2	77	Bobby Hillin Jr.	Jasper Motorsports	Ford	187	0	Running	103
21	14	9	Lake Speed	Melling Racing	Ford	187	0	Running	100
22	15	75	Rick Mast	Butch Mock Motorsports	Ford	187	0	Running	97
23	40	37	Jeremy Mayfield	Kranefuss-Haas Racing	Ford	187	0	Running	94
24	38	16	Ted Musgrave	Roush Racing	Ford	187	1	Running	96
25	13	20	Greg Sacks	Rainer-Walsh Racing	Ford	187	0	Running	88
26	30	81	Kenny Wallace	FILMAR Racing	Ford	187	0	Running	85
27	33	25	Ricky Craven	Hendrick Motorsports	Chevrolet	186	0	Running	82
28	41	1	Morgan Shepherd	Precision Products Racing	Pontiac	186	0	Running	79
29	22	29	Robert Pressley	Diamond Ridge Motorsports	Chevrolet	186	0	Running	76
30	37	71	Dave Marcis	Marcis Auto Racing	Chevrolet	186	0	Running	73
31	35	43	Bobby Hamilton	Petty Enterprises	Pontiac	186	0	Running	70
32	43	17	Darrell Waltrip	Darrell Waltrip Motorsports	Chevrolet	186	0	Running	67
33	31	11	Brett Bodine	Brett Bodine Racing	Ford	186	0	Running	64
34	42	97	Chad Little	Mark Rypien Motorsports	Pontiac	185	0	Running	61
35	9	88	Dale Jarrett	Robert Yates Racing	Ford	184	0	Running	58
36	23	8	Hut Stricklin	Stavola Brothers Racing	Ford	183	0	Running	55
37	4	2	Rusty Wallace	Penske Racing	Ford	180	1	Engine	57
38	34	96	David Green	American Equipment Racing	Chevrolet	169	0	Engine	49
39	16	4	Sterling Marlin	Morgan–McClure Motorsports	Chevrolet	113	10	Engine	51
40	21	44	Kyle Petty	PE2 Motorsports	Pontiac	109	0	Running	43
41	24	41	Steve Grissom	Larry Hedrick Motorsports	Chevrolet	93	0	Engine	40
42	25	22	Ward Burton	Bill Davis Racing	Pontiac	85	0	Engine	37
43	19	7	Geoff Bodine	Geoff Bodine Racing	Ford	78	2	Engine	39

Lap leaders
Laps	Leader
1–18	John Andretti
19–26	Dale Earnhardt
27	Mark Martin
28–30	Jeff Gordon
31–38	Dale Earnhardt
39	John Andretti
40	Dale Earnhardt
41	Jeff Gordon
42–49	Sterling Marlin
50–51	Mike Skinner
52	Ted Musgrave
53–54	Geoff Bodine
55–89	Dale Earnhardt
90	Rusty Wallace
91–104	Dale Earnhardt
105	Michael Waltrip
106–107	Sterling Marlin
108–117	Jeff Burton
118	Ken Schrader
119–126	Jeff Gordon
127–128	Dale Earnhardt
129–131	Jeff Burton
132–139	Dale Earnhardt
140–154	Mark Martin
155–156	Ernie Irvan
157	Jeff Gordon
158–188	Mark Martin

Total laps led
Laps led	Driver
76	Dale Earnhardt
47	Mark Martin
19	John Andretti
13	Jeff Gordon
13	Jeff Burton
10	Sterling Marlin
2	Ernie Irvan
2	Mike Skinner
2	Geoff Bodine
1	Ken Schrader
1	Michael Waltrip
1	Ted Musgrave
1	Rusty Wallace

== Standings after the race ==
Pos	Driver	Points
1 ▲	Terry Labonte	1544
2 ▲	Jeff Gordon	1505
3 ▼	Dale Jarrett	1492
4	Mark Martin	1394
5	Bobby Labonte	1329
6 ▲	Dale Earnhardt	1287
7 ▼	Jeff Burton	1277
8 ▲	Ricky Rudd	1172
9 ▲	Michael Waltrip	1126
10 ▼	Bobby Hamilton	1121

Previous race: 1997 Save Mart Supermarkets 300	NASCAR Winston Cup Series; 1997 season	Next race: 1997 Coca-Cola 600
