= 1997 Interstate Batteries 500 =

Auto race held at Texas Motor Speedway in 1997

Race details
- Race 6 of 32 in the 1997 NASCAR Winston Cup Series
- Simple line diagram of Texas Motor Speedway track layout
- Date: April 6, 1997
- Official name: Inaugural Interstate Batteries 500
- Location: Texas Motor Speedway in Fort Worth, Texas
- Course: Permanent racing facility
- Course length: 1.5 miles (2.4 km)
- Distance: 334 laps, 501 mi (806.281 km)
- Weather: Mild with temperatures of 71.6 °F (22.0 °C); wind speeds of 14 miles per hour (23 km/h)

Pole position
Driver	Dale Jarrett	Robert Yates Racing
- Time: Set by 1997 owner's points

Most laps led
Driver	Terry Labonte	Hendrick Motorsports
- Laps: 104

Winner
No. 99	Jeff Burton	Roush Racing

Television in the United States
- Network: CBS
- Announcers: Ken Squier, Ned Jarrett, Buddy Baker

Radio in the United States
- Radio: Performance Racing Network

The 1997 Interstate Batteries 500 was a NASCAR Winston Cup Series stock car race held on April 6, 1997, at Texas Motor Speedway in Fort Worth, Texas. The race was the inaugural Cup Series race at the track, and it was the first time Interstate Batteries served as a sponsor for NASCAR. The race was the sixth of the 1997 NASCAR Winston Cup Series season. The pace car was the Chevrolet Monte Carlo Z34 with a 3.8L engine, the first of its kind to serve as a pace car. As qualifying was canceled due to rain, the pole position was awarded to points leader Dale Jarrett of Yates Racing. Terry Labonte of Hendrick Motorsports led the most laps with 104, while Roush Racing's Jeff Burton scored his first Cup Series victory after leading 60 laps, including the final 58.

== Traffic delays ==
As a result of the rain, besides qualifying being canceled, many of the track's parking lots were flooded. Track owner Bruton Smith received help from the Texas Department of Transportation, which closed down a portion of Texas State Highway 170 to use it as a parking lot. Although the parking lot issue was solved, traffic concerns arose, and on race day, by 8 AM, traffic on Interstate 35W stopped 16 miles south of the track. Due to the traffic, pianist Van Cliburn, who was scheduled to perform the national anthem at the race, had his helicopter delayed and could not perform.

== Race ==
The race started with a 13-car crash on the first lap. The crash was the first in a wreck-laden race, with ten cautions and 73 laps under the yellow flag, the most in track history. Late in the race, Jeff Burton took the lead, and led the final 58 laps of the race to win his first career Cup race. Dale Jarrett finished second, followed by Bobby Labonte, Terry Labonte, and Ricky Rudd.

== Results ==
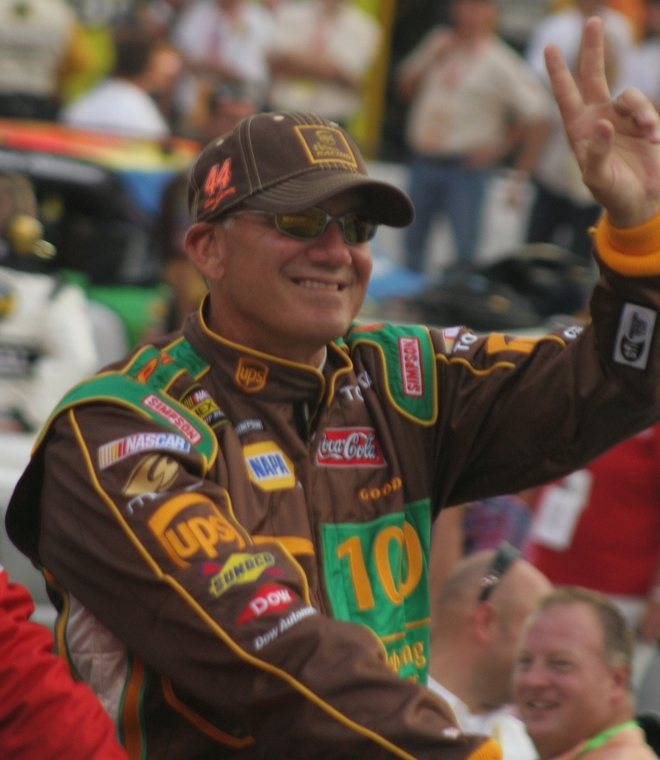
Dale Jarrett led the points standings after the race.

Pos	Grid	No.	Driver	Team	Manufacturer	Laps	Laps led	Points	Time/Status
1	5	99	Jeff Burton	Roush Racing	Ford	334	60	180	4:00:16
2	1	88	Dale Jarrett	Robert Yates Racing	Ford	334	42	175	+4.067 seconds
3	4	18	Bobby Labonte	Joe Gibbs Racing	Pontiac	334	2	170	Lead lap under green flag
4	3	5	Terry Labonte	Hendrick Motorsports	Chevrolet	334	104	170	Lead lap under green flag
5	8	10	Ricky Rudd	Rudd Performance Motorsports	Ford	334	26	160	Lead lap under green flag
6	15	3	Dale Earnhardt	Richard Childress Racing	Chevrolet	334	0	150	Lead lap under green flag
7	12	22	Ward Burton	Bill Davis Racing	Pontiac	334	0	146	Lead lap under green flag
8	22	4	Sterling Marlin	Morgan–McClure Motorsports	Chevrolet	334	2	147	Lead lap under green flag
9	21	21	Michael Waltrip	Wood Brothers Racing	Ford	333	0	138	+1 lap
10	35	41	Steve Grissom	Larry Hedrick Motorsports	Chevrolet	332	0	134	+2 laps
11	16	94	Bill Elliott	Bill Elliott Racing	Ford	332	0	130	+2 laps
12	30	98	John Andretti	Cale Yarborough Motorsports	Ford	332	0	127	+2 laps
13	31	81	Kenny Wallace	FILMAR Racing	Ford	332	0	124	+2 laps
14	7	7	Geoff Bodine	Geoff Bodine Racing	Ford	331	0	121	+3 laps
15	36	71	Dave Marcis	Marcis Auto Racing	Chevrolet	331	0	118	+3 laps
16	24	9	Lake Speed	Melling Racing	Ford	331	0	115	+3 laps
17	42	91	Mike Wallace	LJ Racing	Chevrolet	330	0	112	+4 laps
18	27	33	Ken Schrader	Andy Petree Racing	Chevrolet	330	0	109	+4 laps
19	26	11	Brett Bodine	Brett Bodine Racing	Ford	327	0	106	+7 laps
20	17	43	Bobby Hamilton	Petty Enterprises	Pontiac	325	0	103	+9 laps
21	43	78	Billy Standridge	Triad Motorsports	Ford	325	0	100	+9 laps
22	25	31	Mike Skinner	Richard Childress Racing	Chevrolet	324	10	102	+10 laps
23	32	90	Dick Trickle	Donlavey Racing	Ford	319	0	94	+15 laps
24	19	1	Morgan Shepherd	Precision Products Racing	Pontiac	304	0	91	+30 laps
25	18	25	Todd Bodine	Hendrick Motorsports	Chevrolet	284	9	93	+50 laps
26	38	97	Chad Little	Mark Rypien Motorsports	Pontiac	283	0	85	+51 laps
27	23	44	Kyle Petty	PE2 Motorsports	Pontiac	266	0	82	+68 laps
28	13	30	Johnny Benson Jr.	Bahari Racing	Pontiac	256	0	79	Crash
29	40	42	Joe Nemechek	Team SABCO	Chevrolet	255	0	76	Crash
30	2	24	Jeff Gordon	Hendrick Motorsports	Chevrolet	247	69	78	+87 laps
31	28	75	Rick Mast	Butch Mock Motorsports	Ford	246	0	70	Engine
32	20	37	Jeremy Mayfield	Kranefuss-Haas Racing	Ford	200	0	67	Handling
33	34	8	Hut Stricklin	Stavola Brothers Racing	Ford	192	0	64	Clutch
34	29	40	Robby Gordon	Team SABCO	Chevrolet	174	0	61	+160 laps
35	11	16	Ted Musgrave	Roush Racing	Ford	167	0	58	Engine
36	10	28	Ernie Irvan	Robert Yates Racing	Ford	161	0	55	Crash
37	9	2	Rusty Wallace	Penske Racing	Ford	160	0	52	Crash
38	6	6	Mark Martin	Roush Racing	Ford	143	10	54	Engine
39	33	23	Jimmy Spencer	Travis Carter Enterprises	Ford	95	0	46	Crash
40	39	20	Greg Sacks	Ranier-Walsh Racing	Ford	84	0	43	Crash
41	37	36	Derrike Cope	MB2 Motorsports	Pontiac	21	0	40	Crash
42	41	77	Bobby Hillin Jr.	Jasper Motorsports	Ford	17	0	37	Crash
43	14	17	Darrell Waltrip	Darrell Waltrip Motorsports	Chevrolet	0	0	34	Crash

Lap leaders
Laps	Leader
1–13	Dale Jarrett
14–66	Jeff Gordon
67–69	Terry Labonte
70	Mark Martin
71–72	Bobby Labonte
73–82	Mike Skinner
83–98	Jeff Gordon
99–107	Terry Labonte
108–134	Dale Jarrett
135–143	Mark Martin
144–145	Dale Jarrett
146–154	Ricky Rudd
155–233	Terry Labonte
234–235	Jeff Burton
236	Todd Bodine
237–238	Sterling Marlin
239–251	Terry Labonte
252–268	Ricky Rudd
269–276	Todd Bodine
277–334	Jeff Burton

Total laps led
Laps led	Driver
104	Terry Labonte
69	Jeff Gordon
60	Jeff Burton
42	Dale Jarrett
26	Ricky Rudd
10	Mike Skinner
10	Mark Martin
9	Todd Bodine
2	Bobby Labonte
2	Sterling Marlin

Cautions: 10 for 73 laps
Laps	Reason
2–11	#1 (Shepherd), #3 (Earnhardt), #9 (Speed), #11 (B. Bodine), #17 (D. Waltrip), #25 (T. Bodine), #31 (Skinner), #44 (Petty) #30 (Benson), #40 (R. Gordon), #37 (Mayfield), #43 (Hamilton), & #75 (Mast) accident turn 1
19–25	#20 (Sacks), #36 (Cope), & #77 (Hillin) accident turn 1
98–105	#23 (Spencer) spin turn 1
144–149	#6 (Martin) engine
163–174	#2 (R. Wallace), #11 (B. Bodine), #20 (Sacks), #24 (J. Gordon), #28 (Irvan), #31 (Skinner), #90 (Trickle), #4 (Marlin), & #16 (Musgrave) accident frontstraight
177–179	#30 (Benson) spin turn 2
184–187	Oil on track
251–257	#41 (Grissom) spin turn 2
259–270	#30 (Benson), #42 (Nemechek), & #97 (Little) accident frontstraight
278–281	#25 (T. Bodine) & #9 (Speed) accident backstraight

== Media ==
=== Television ===
The Interstate Batteries 500 was covered by CBS for the first time in the United States. Ken Squier, two-time NASCAR Cup Series champion Ned Jarrett and nineteen-time NASCAR Cup Series race winner Buddy Baker called the race from the broadcast booth. Mike Joy, Dick Berggren and Ralph Sheheen handled pit road for the television side.

CBS
Booth announcers		Pit reporters
Lap-by-lap	Color-commentators	Pit reporters
Ken Squier	Ned Jarrett; Buddy Baker	Mike Joy; Dick Berggren; Ralph Sheheen

=== Standings after the race ===
Pos	Driver	Points	Differential
1	Dale Jarrett	994	0
2 ▲	Terry Labonte	899	-95
3 ▲	Bobby Labonte	858	-136
4 ▲	Jeff Burton	837	-157
5 ▼	Jeff Gordon	810	-184
6 ▲	Ricky Rudd	775	-219
7	Geoff Bodine	740	-254
8 ▲	Ward Burton	709	-285
8 ▼	Mark Martin	709	-285
10 ▲	Dale Earnhardt	703	-291

Previous race: 1997 TranSouth Financial 400	NASCAR Winston Cup Series; 1997 season	Next race: 1997 Food City 500
