= American Equipment Racing =

Defunct racing team

- Owner: Buz McCall
- Base: Charlotte, North Carolina
- Series: Trans-Am; Winston Cup; Busch Series
- Race drivers: Scott Sharp, Jack Baldwin; Ward Burton, David Green
- Manufacturer: Chevrolet
- Closed: 1998

Career
- Drivers' Championships: 0; 0
- Race victories: 2

American Equipment Racing was a racing team that competed in the SCCA Trans-Am series in the 1980s and 1990s, and in the NASCAR Busch Grand National and Winston Cup Series during the mid-1990s.

Owned by American Equipment Company owner Buz McCall, AER competed in IMSA sports-car racing and the Trans-Am series in the 1980s and early 1990s; the team won four consecutive Trans-Am championships with drivers Scott Sharp, Jack Baldwin, and Scott Pruett from 1991 to 1994.

The team moved to NASCAR starting in 1994, competing in the Busch Grand National Series with Trans-Am Champion Jack Baldwin driving in two races, running the No. 95. Signing rookie driver John Tanner and sponsor Caterpillar Inc. for 1995, the team ran half of the 1995 season; Tanner was released after a handful of races and replaced for the majority of the team's races with Ward Burton. For 1996 AER signed 1994 Busch Series champion David Green to run for full-time in 1996. Finishing 2nd in series points, Green and AER moved up to the Winston Cup Series in 1997, where after a difficult season Green finished 37th in points. After twelve races in 1998, Green was released by the team, and a variety of drivers, including Hut Stricklin and Steve Grissom, drove for the team to finish out the year; the team closed following the 1998 season when they lost the Caterpillar sponsorship.

== Motorsports career results ==
=== Winston Cup results ===
(key) (Bold – Pole position awarded by qualifying time. Italics – Pole position earned by points standings or practice time. * – Most laps led.)

==== Car No. 96 Results ====
Year	Driver	No.	Make	1	2	3	4	5	6	7	8	9	10	11	12	13	14	15	16	17	18	19	20	21	22	23	24	25	26	27	28	29	30	31	32	33	Owners	Pts
1997	David Green	96	Chevy	DAY; DNQ	CAR; 38	RCH; 33	ATL; 24	DAR; 41	TEX; DNQ	BRI; 22	MAR; DNQ	SON; DNQ	TAL; 38	CLT; 16	DOV; 18	POC; 28	MCH; 28	CAL; 25	DAY; 19	NHA; 24	POC; 39	IND; 35	GLN; 22	MCH; 20	BRI; 39		RCH; 37	NHA; 40	DOV; 25	MAR; 20	CLT; 31	TAL; 16	CAR; 27	PHO; 29	ATL; DNQ		39th	2167
1997	Todd Bodine	96	Chevy																							DAR; 42											39th	2167
1998	David Green	96	Chevy	DAY; DNQ	CAR; 42	LVS; 34	ATL; 30	DAR; 26	BRI; 21	TEX; 18	MAR; 43	TAL; 17	CAL; 18	CLT; 43	DOV; 38																						43rd	1919
1998	Kevin Lepage	96	Chevy													RCH; 33																					43rd	1919
1998	Hut Stricklin	96	Chevy														MCH; 42	POC; 28		NHA; 42	POC; 27	IND; DNQ		MCH; DNQ	BRI; 41		DAR; DNQ										43rd	1919
1998	Robby Gordon	96	Chevy																SON; 36																		43rd	1919
1998	Ron Fellows	96	Chevy																				GLN; 42			NHA; 36											43rd	1919
1998	Ted Musgrave	96	Chevy																									RCH; 25									43rd	1919
1998	Morgan Shepherd	96	Chevy																										DOV; DNQ								43rd	1919
1998	Mike Bliss	96	Chevy																											MAR; 25				PHO; 35			43rd	1919
1998	Steve Grissom	96	Chevy																												CLT; 32	TAL; 36	DAY; 29		CAR; DNQ	ATL; DNQ	43rd	1919

=== Busch Grand National results ===
(key) (Bold – Pole position awarded by qualifying time. Italics – Pole position earned by points standings or practice time. * – Most laps led.)

==== Car No. 95 Results ====
Year	Driver	No.	Make	1	2	3	4	5	6	7	8	9	10	11	12	13	14	15	16	17	18	19	20	21	22	23	24	25	26	27	28	Owners	Pts
1994	Jack Baldwin	95	Chevy	DAY	CAR	RCH	ATL; 23	MAR	DAR; 24	HCY	BRI	ROU	NHA	NZH	CLT	DOV	MYB	GLN	MLW	SBO	TAL	HCY	IRP	MCH	BRI	DAR	RCH	DOV	CLT	MAR	CAR		
1995	John Tanner	95	Chevy	DAY	CAR; 31	RCH; 26	ATL	NSV; 39	DAR; 21	BRI; DNQ	HCY; DNQ																						
1995	Ward Burton	95	Chevy									NHA; 13		CLT; 11	DOV; 31	MYB			TAL; 36	SBO; 5	IRP; 8	MCH; 8		DAR; 3	RCH	DOV; 12	CLT; 38	CAR; 4	HOM; 31				
1995	Ed Berrier	95	Chevy										NZH; 33					MLW; 38					BRI; 34										
1995	Butch Leitzinger	95	Chevy														GLN; 16																
1996	David Green	95	Chevy	DAY; 12	CAR; 6	RCH; 3	ATL; 2	NSV; 2	DAR; 14	BRI; 7	**HCY**; 1*	**NZH**; 2*	CLT; 19	DOV; 4	SBO; 20	**MYB**; 1*	**GLN**; 5	MLW; 32	NHA; 3	TAL; 10	IRP; 3	MCH; 7	BRI; 11	DAR; 4	RCH; 2	DOV; 18	CLT; 40	CAR; 5	HOM; 9				
