= Triad Motorsports =

Motorsports team

Triad Motorsports was a motorsports team that competed in the NASCAR Winston Cup Series and ARCA Menards Series from 1993 to 1999. The team was owned by Jim Wilson. The team's drivers included Gary Bradberry, Billy Standridge and Randy MacDonald.

== NASCAR ==
The team debuted the No. 78 Ford Thunderbird in 1993 at the First Union 400 at North Wilkesboro Speedway with driver Jay Hedgecock. Hedgecock would miss the race. They would attempt Pocono later that year, again missing the race. Hedgecock would qualify the 78 at the fall Wilkesboro event. Hedgecock would return in 1994, qualifying for both races he attempted. Pancho Carter would also attempt three races, qualifying for one. Carter would again attempt three races in 1995, and would once again only make one. Canadian driver Randy MacDonald would join the team in 1996 with limited success. The team did however score its first big sponsorship break, with country music band Diamond Rio and Hanes coming aboard. MacDonald had declared for Rookie of the Year, however, success was again limited. MacDonald would attempt 12 races, only qualifying for three. Following his DNQ at the 1996 Southern 500, MacDonald was released in favor of Billy Standridge. Standridge would qualify for three races and was signed for the 1997 season. For the first time, Triad would attempt their first full season. The effort would once again prove futile, as Standridge would only qualify for five of the first 17 races. Standridge would leave and re-open his own team. He would be replaced by Gary Bradberry, who had been released by TriStar Motorsports earlier that season. Bradberry would successfully qualify for eight out of 12 races he attempted with the team. At the end of the season, Bradberry was announced to be the team's full time driver for 1998, with sponsorship from Pilot Travel Centers and Flying J. The team's hopes of a successful season began to falter, as Bradberry only timed in with lap of 48.967 at 183 mph in his new Ford Taurus, leaving him 52nd of the 55 drivers entered. The team's former driver Standridge, would qualify 20th in his year old, underfunded, self owned 47 Ford Thunderbird. After starting 21st in his duel, Bradberry came up two spots short of advancing and missed the 500. Bradberry would not qualify until the fourth race of the season at Atlanta, starting 20th. The race, would go extremely bad, as the car only lasted 12 laps, leaving Bradberry and the 78 43rd. The 78 would miss the next two races before qualifying in fine fashion at Texas, starting 10th and finishing 24th. Following two more DNQ's, Bradberry would qualify for Fontana, Charlotte and Dover. Despite this, the team would skip Richmond, and instead return at Michigan, finishing 34th. The team would skip, Pocono, Infineon and New Hampshire, the latter which saw Bradberry take a turn behind the wheel of the ISM Racing Pontiac, known as the "Tobasco Fiasco", finishing 40th after an engine failure. Bradberry and Triad would return at the second Pocono race, missing the show. At the 1998 Brickyard 400, during second round qualifying, Bradberry had a hard crash in turn 2. Team and driver would not make another start until the 1998 Southern 500, finishing 37th. The team would make the final three races of the season, finishing no better than 28th. The team would set eyes in 1999, with Bradberry returning. However, like the previous two seasons, the team would miss the 500. Following three withdrawals and sponsorship problems, owner Jim Wilson had enough, and shut his team down, never to be seen in NASCAR again.

=== Car No. 78 results ===
NASCAR Winston Cup Series results
Year	Driver	No.	Make	1	2	3	4	5	6	7	8	9	10	11	12	13	14	15	16	17	18	19	20	21	22	23	24	25	26	27	28	29	30	31	32	33	34	NWCC	Pts
1993	Jay Hedgecock	78	Ford	DAY	CAR	RCH	ATL	DAR	BRI	NWS; DNQ	MAR	TAL	SON	CLT	DOV	POC	MCH	DAY	NHA	POC; DNQ	TAL	GLN	MCH	BRI	DAR	RCH	DOV	MAR	NWS; 26	CLT	CAR	PHO	ATL						
1994	Jay Hedgecock	78	Ford	DAY	CAR	RCH	ATL	DAR	BRI	NWS; 36	MAR; 25	TAL	SON	CLT	DOV	POC	MCH	DAY	NHA	POC	TAL	IND	GLN	MCH	BRI	DAR	RCH	DOV	MAR	NWS									
1994	Pancho Carter	78	Ford																												CLT; DNQ	CAR	PHO	ATL; 17					
1995	Jay Hedgecock	78	Ford	DAY	CAR	RCH; DNQ				NWS; DNQ	MAR; DNQ	TAL	SON	CLT	DOV												RCH; DNQ	DOV	MAR	NWS; DNQ	CLT	CAR; DNQ	PHO	ATL					
1995	Pancho Carter	78	Ford				ATL; DNQ	DAR								POC; 35	MCH	DAY	NHA	POC	TAL	IND; DNQ	GLN	MCH	BRI	DAR													
1995	Hut Stricklin	78	Ford						BRI; DNQ																														
1996	Randy MacDonald	78	Ford	DAY	CAR; DNQ	RCH; DNQ	ATL; DNQ	DAR; DNQ	BRI	NWS; DNQ	MAR; DNQ	TAL	SON	CLT; DNQ	DOV	POC; 24	MCH	DAY	NHA; 32	POC; 31	TAL	IND; DNQ	GLN	MCH	BRI	DAR; DNQ	RCH	DOV										41st	426
1996	Billy Standridge	78	Ford																										MAR; DNQ	NWS	CLT; 27	CAR; 41	PHO	ATL; 29				41st	426
1997	Billy Standridge	78	Ford	DAY; DNQ	CAR; DNQ	RCH; DNQ	ATL; 36	DAR; DNQ	TEX; 21	BRI; DNQ	MAR; DNQ		TAL; DNQ	CLT; 32	DOV; DNQ	POC; DNQ	MCH; 33	CAL; DNQ	DAY; 40	NHA; DNQ																		44th	1370
1997	Tom Hubert	78	Ford									SON; 28																										44th	1370
1997	Bobby Hillin Jr.	78	Ford																		POC; DNQ	IND; DNQ	GLN; DNQ															44th	1370
1997	Gary Bradberry	78	Ford																					MCH; 37	BRI; 37	DAR; 25	RCH; DNQ	NHA; 34	DOV; 35	MAR; DNQ	CLT; 34	TAL; DNQ	CAR; 41	PHO; DNQ	ATL; 42			44th	1370
1998	Gary Bradberry	78	Ford	DAY; DNQ	CAR; DNQ	LVS; DNQ	ATL; 43	DAR; DNQ	BRI; DNQ	TEX; 24	MAR; DNQ	TAL; DNQ	CAL; 23	CLT; 37	DOV; 34	RCH	MCH; 34	POC	SON	NHA	POC; DNQ	IND; DNQ	GLN	MCH; DNQ	BRI; DNQ	NHA	DAR; 37	RCH; DNQ	DOV; 28	MAR; DNQ	CLT; 42	TAL; DNQ	DAY; DNQ	PHO; 41	CAR; 28	ATL; 33		45th	1053
1999	Gary Bradberry	78	Ford	DAY; DNQ	CAR	LVS	ATL	DAR	TEX	BRI	MAR	TAL	CAL	RCH	CLT	DOV	MCH	POC	SON	DAY	NHA	POC	IND	GLN	MCH	BRI	DAR	RCH	NHA	DOV	MAR	CLT	TAL	CAR	PHO	HOM	ATL	N/A	-

== ARCA ==
Triad would run four ARCA races, all in 1996, two with MacDonald and two with Standridge. MacDonald would score the pole position at the first Pocono race, but would break an oil pump and finish 16th. Standridge's best run came at Charlotte, where he started 3rd and finished 14th.
