= Billy Standridge =

American stock car racing driver

- Born: November 27, 1953; Shelby, North Carolina, U.S.
- Died: April 12, 2014 (aged 60); Lake Wylie, South Carolina, U.S.
- Cause of death: Cancer

NASCAR Cup Series career
- 23 races run over 7 years
- Best finish: 47th (1994)
- First race: 1994 Goodwrench 500 (Rockingham)
- Last race: 1998 Pepsi 400 (Daytona)
Wins	Top tens	Poles
0	0	0

NASCAR O'Reilly Auto Parts Series career
- 84 races run over 8 years
- Best finish: 12th (1988)
- First race: 1988 All Pro 300 (Charlotte)
- Last race: 1993 AC-Delco 200 (Rockingham)
Wins	Top tens	Poles
0	5	0

William Gerald Standridge (November 27, 1953 – April 12, 2014) was an American stock car racing driver. He was a competitor in the NASCAR Winston Cup Series and Busch Series.

== Career ==
Born November 27, 1953, Standridge started his racing career in the Goody's Dash Series. Standridge began running the NASCAR Busch Series in 1986, when he finished fourteenth at the All Pro 300 at Charlotte Motor Speedway in his own Pontiac. After that, he began running a limited schedule in the Busch Series, posting five top-ten finishes in 84 starts, the last of which came in 1993. In 1994, he began running a limited schedule in Winston Cup, making his debut at North Carolina Speedway but finishing 42nd after a crash. He ran seven more races that year, his best finish being a 24th at the Southern 500 as well as picking up sponsorship from the WCW and Dura Lube. He followed that up with a fourteenth-place finish at Darlington the following year.

After an unsuccessful stint with Triad Motorsports in 1996 and 1997 (he was released after New Hampshire's summer race in 1997), Standridge began running his own team, the No. 47 Ford Thunderbird, picking up sponsorship from Jayski's Silly Season Site and also from fan-sponsored donations. He even picked up sponsorship from Phillips after Geoff Bodine failed to qualify for a 1998 Talladega race. Standridge was one of the last drivers to run in NASCAR using a Thunderbird after other teams switched to the redesigned Taurus for the 1998 season.

Standridge's last career start was that the Pepsi 400 in 1998, where his engine expired nineteen laps into the race. His last attempt ever came in 1999, when he filled in for Dan Pardus in the Midwest Transit Racing Chevy at Rockingham Speedway in second-round-qualifying, but his time was not fast enough to make the race. Outside of NASCAR, Standridge ran an auto-parts store in Shelby, North Carolina.

In March 2014, Standridge was diagnosed with cancer. He died on April 12, 2014, at his home in Lake Wylie, South Carolina. Standridge was survived by his wife, five children, and seven grandchildren.

== Motorsports career results ==
=== NASCAR ===
(key) (Bold – Pole position awarded by qualifying time. Italics – Pole position earned by points standings or practice time. * – Most laps led.)

==== Winston Cup Series ====
NASCAR Winston Cup Series results
Year	Team	No.	Make	1	2	3	4	5	6	7	8	9	10	11	12	13	14	15	16	17	18	19	20	21	22	23	24	25	26	27	28	29	30	31	32	33	34	NWCC	Pts	Ref
1993	Johnson Standridge Racing	47	Ford	DAY	CAR	RCH	ATL	DAR	BRI	NWS	MAR	TAL	SON	CLT	DOV	POC	MCH	DAY	NHA	POC	TAL	GLN	MCH	BRI	DAR	RCH	DOV	MAR	NWS	CLT; DNQ	CAR; DNQ	PHO	ATL; DNQ					NA	-	
1994	Johnson Standridge Racing	47	Ford	DAY; DNQ	CAR; 42	RCH; DNQ	ATL; DNQ	DAR; DNQ	BRI	NWS	MAR	TAL	SON	CLT; 43	DOV; 36	POC; DNQ	MCH; DNQ	DAY; DNQ	NHA	POC; 41	TAL; DNQ	IND; DNQ	GLN	MCH; 39	BRI	DAR; 24	RCH; DNQ	DOV; DNQ	MAR	NWS	CLT; 34	CAR; 41	PHO	ATL; DNQ				47th	404	
1995	Johnson Standridge Racing	47	Ford	DAY; DNQ	CAR; DNQ	RCH; DNQ	ATL; 25	DAR; 14	BRI; DNQ	NWS; DNQ	MAR	TAL; DNQ	SON	CLT	DOV	POC	MCH	DAY	NHA	POC	TAL																	51st	209	
1995	Johnson Standridge Racing	66	Ford																			IND; DNQ	GLN	MCH	BRI	DAR; DNQ	RCH	DOV; DNQ	MAR	NWS	CLT; DNQ	CAR	PHO	ATL; DNQ				51st	209	
1996	Triad Motorsports	78	Ford	DAY	CAR	RCH	ATL	DAR	BRI	NWS	MAR	TAL	SON	CLT	DOV	POC	MCH	DAY	NHA	POC	TAL	IND	GLN	MCH	BRI	DAR	RCH	DOV	MAR; DNQ	NWS	CLT; 27	CAR; 41	PHO	ATL; 29				51st	198	
1997	Triad Motorsports	78	Ford	DAY; DNQ	CAR; DNQ	RCH; DNQ	ATL; 36	DAR; DNQ	TEX; 21	BRI; DNQ	MAR; DNQ	SON	TAL; DNQ	CLT; 32	DOV; DNQ	POC; DNQ	MCH; 33	CAL; DNQ	DAY; 40	NHA; DNQ	POC	IND	GLN	MCH	BRI	DAR	RCH	NHA	DOV	MAR	CLT							50th	366	
1997	Standridge Motorsports	47	Ford																													TAL; 42	CAR	PHO	ATL			50th	366	
1998	Standridge Motorsports	47	Ford	DAY; 35	CAR	LVS	ATL	DAR	BRI			TAL; 28	CAL	CLT; DNQ	DOV	RCH	MCH	POC	SON	NHA	POC	IND	GLN	MCH	BRI	NHA	DAR	RCH	DOV	MAR	CLT	TAL; 28	DAY; 43	PHO	CAR	ATL		55th	250	
1998	Standridge Motorsports	47	Chevy							TEX; DNQ	MAR																											55th	250	
1999	Standridge Motorsports	47	Ford	DAY; DNQ																																		NA	-	
1999	Midwest Transit Racing	50	Chevy		CAR; DNQ	LVS	ATL	DAR	TEX	BRI	MAR	TAL	CAL	RCH	CLT	DOV	MCH	POC	SON	DAY	NHA	POC	IND	GLN	MCH	BRI	DAR	RCH	NHA	DOV	MAR	CLT	TAL	CAR	PHO	HOM	ATL	NA	-	

===== Daytona 500 results =====
Year	Team	Manufacturer	Start	Finish
1994	Standridge Motorsports	Ford	DNQ	
1995	Standridge Motorsports	Ford	DNQ	
1997	Triad Motorsports	Ford	DNQ	
1998	Standridge Motorsports	Ford	36	35
1999	Standridge Motorsports	Ford	DNQ	

==== Busch Series ====
NASCAR Busch Series results
Year	Team	No.	Make	1	2	3	4	5	6	7	8	9	10	11	12	13	14	15	16	17	18	19	20	21	22	23	24	25	26	27	28	29	30	31	NBGNC	Pts	Ref
1986	Standridge Motorsports	37	Pontiac	DAY	CAR	HCY	MAR	BRI	DAR	SBO	LGY	JFC	DOV	CLT	SBO	HCY	ROU	IRP	SBO	RAL	OXF	SBO	HCY	LGY	ROU	BRI	DAR	RCH	DOV	MAR	ROU	CLT; 14	CAR	MAR	69th	121	
1987	Standridge Motorsports	47	Pontiac	DAY; 26	HCY	MAR	DAR	BRI	LGY	SBO																	MAR; 29								40th	507	
1987	Standridge Motorsports	47	Chevy								CLT; 20	DOV; 32	IRP	ROU	JFC	OXF	SBO	HCY	RAL	LGY	ROU	BRI	JFC	DAR; 27	RCH	DOV		CLT; 23	CAR	MAR					40th	507	
1988	Standridge Motorsports	47	Chevy	DAY; 39				DAR; 19						CLT; 32	DOV; 32												DAR; 20		DOV; 14		CLT; 8	CAR; 38			12th	3040	
1988	Standridge Motorsports	47	Pontiac		HCY; 23	CAR	MAR; 12		BRI; 26	LNG; 16	NZH; 30	SBO; 13	NSV; 14			ROU; 10	LAN; 7	LVL; 23	MYB; 14		SBO; 18	HCY; 16	LNG; 16	IRP; 22	ROU; 13	BRI; 14		RCH; 17		MAR; 19			MAR; 21		12th	3040	
1988	Standridge Motorsports	57	Pontiac																	OXF; 19															12th	3040	
1989	Standridge Motorsports	47	Pontiac	DAY; 16	CAR; 33	MAR; 24	HCY; 24	DAR; 25	BRI; 15	NZH; 13	SBO; 19	LAN; 8	NSV; 19	CLT; 28	DOV; 25	ROU; 17	LVL; 18	VOL; 15	MYB; 29	SBO; 11	HCY; 17	DUB; 21	IRP; 25	ROU; 20	BRI; 13	DAR; 15	RCH	DOV	MAR; 6	CLT; 13	CAR; 34	MAR; 19			14th	2843	
1990	Standridge Motorsports	47	Pontiac	DAY; DNQ	RCH	CAR	MAR	HCY; 13	DAR	BRI	LAN; 24	SBO; 28	NZH	HCY; 22	CLT; 21	DOV	ROU; 21	VOL; 15	MYB	OXF	NHA	SBO; 25	DUB; 14	IRP; 18	ROU; 30	BRI; 19	DAR; 26	RCH	DOV	MAR; 23	CLT; 25	NHA	CAR	MAR; 14	29th	1594	
1991	Standridge Motorsports	47	Pontiac	DAY	RCH	CAR	MAR	VOL	HCY	DAR	BRI	LAN	SBO	NZH	CLT	DOV	ROU	HCY	MYB	GLN	OXF	NHA	SBO	DUB	IRP	ROU	BRI	DAR; 24	RCH	DOV	CLT	NHA	CAR; 19	MAR	75th	197	
1992	Standridge Motorsports	47	Pontiac	DAY	CAR	RCH	ATL	MAR	DAR	BRI	HCY	LAN	DUB	NZH	CLT	DOV	ROU	MYB	GLN	VOL	NHA	TAL	IRP	ROU	MCH	NHA	BRI	DAR	RCH	DOV	CLT; 24	MAR	CAR	HCY	105th	91	
1993	Standridge Motorsports	47	Pontiac	DAY	CAR	RCH	DAR	BRI	HCY	ROU	MAR	NZH	CLT	DOV	MYB	GLN	MLW	TAL; 23	IRP	MCH	NHA	BRI	DAR	RCH	DOV	ROU	CLT	MAR	CAR; 23	HCY	ATL				70th	188	

=== ARCA Bondo/Mar-Hyde Series ===
(key) (Bold – Pole position awarded by qualifying time. Italics – Pole position earned by points standings or practice time. * – Most laps led.)

ARCA Bondo/Mar-Hyde Series results
Year	Team	No.	Make	1	2	3	4	5	6	7	8	9	10	11	12	13	14	15	16	17	18	19	20	21	22	23	24	25	ABSC	Pts	Ref
1996	Triad Motorsports	78	Ford	DAY	ATL	SLM	TAL	FIF	LVL	CLT	CLT	KIL	FRS	POC	MCH	FRS	TOL	POC	MCH	INF	SBS	ISF	DSF	KIL	SLM	WIN	CLT; 14	ATL; 25	120th	-	
