= Rudd Performance Motorsports =

Former NASCAR team

- Owner: Ricky Rudd
- Base: 292 Rolling Hills Road, Mooresville, North Carolina
- Series: Winston Cup Series
- Race drivers: Ricky Rudd
- Manufacturer: Ford
- Opened: 1994
- Closed: 1999

Career
- Races competed: 192
- Race victories: 6

Rudd Performance Motorsports was a stock car racing team that competed in the NASCAR Winston Cup Series between 1994 and 1999. Owned by Ricky Rudd, the team's only driver, it posted six wins during its existence.

== Winston Cup Series ==
=== Car No. 10 history ===
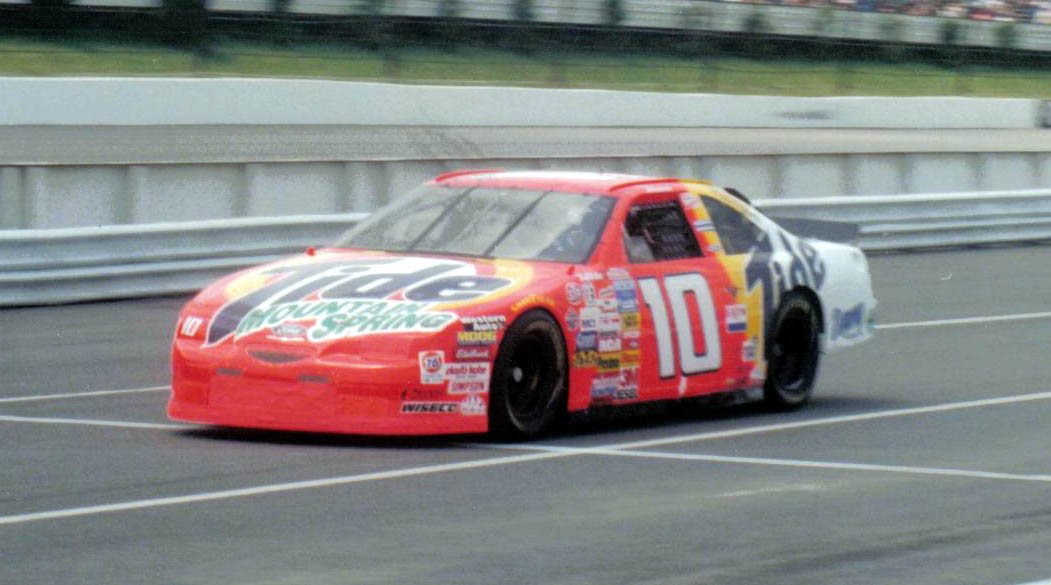
Ricky Rudd in 1997 at Pocono

Rudd founded the team following the 1993 NASCAR Winston Cup Series season; Tide detergent, which would be the team's only sponsor, followed Rudd to his new team from his previous ride with Hendrick Motorsports. The team finished fifth in points in its first season, then ninth in 1995, and sixth in 1996, before falling to 17th in 1997, 22nd in 1998 and 31st in 1999. Rudd and the team scored one win each season from 1994 to 1998, except for two in 1997, before going winless in the team's final year.

Towards the end of the 1999 season Tide announced they were leaving the team and moving to PPI Motorsports who was entering NASCAR from CART with driver Scott Pruett. Following the 1999 season without a sponsor, Rudd closed his team, having decided that the stress of balancing team ownership with driving was unprofitable and moved to drive Robert Yates Racing's No. 28 starting in 2000. The assets of Rudd Performance Motorsports were auctioned off on December 1, 1999.

=== Car No. 10 results ===
Year	Driver	No.	Make	1	2	3	4	5	6	7	8	9	10	11	12	13	14	15	16	17	18	19	20	21	22	23	24	25	26	27	28	29	30	31	32	33	34	Owners	Pts
1994	Ricky Rudd	10	Ford	DAY; 8	CAR; 11	RCH; 18	ATL; 9	DAR; 9	BRI; 32	NWS; 6	MAR; 12	TAL; 25	SON; 14	CLT; 6	DOV; 19	POC; 21	MCH; 4	DAY; 17	NHA; 1	POC; 6	TAL; 7	IND; 11	GLN; 5	MCH; 10	BRI; 12	DAR; 4	RCH; 5	DOV; 18	MAR; 25	NWS; 11	CLT; 29	CAR; 4	PHO; 7	ATL; 14				6th	4050
1995	Ricky Rudd	10	Ford	DAY; 13	CAR; 4	RCH; 21	ATL; 8	DAR; 41	BRI; 5	NWS; 29	MAR; 30	TAL; 22	SON; 4	CLT; 5	DOV; 31	POC; 13	MCH; 38	DAY; 8	NHA; 5	POC; 3	TAL; 41	IND; 20	GLN; 4	MCH; 30	BRI; 36	DAR; 6	RCH; 8	DOV; 10	MAR; 27	NWS; 5	CLT; 4*	CAR; 13	PHO; 1	ATL; 10				9th	3734
1996	Ricky Rudd	10	Ford	DAY; 9	CAR; 4	RCH; 9	ATL; 8	DAR; 9	BRI; 14	NWS; 15	MAR; 23	TAL; 28	SON; 7	CLT; 15	DOV; 8	POC; 2	MCH; 31	DAY; 33	NHA; 3	POC; 2	TAL; 37	IND; 6	GLN; 34	MCH; 8	BRI; 9	DAR; 16	RCH; 12	DOV; 34	MAR; 35	NWS; 7	CLT; 13	CAR; 1	PHO; 14	ATL; 8				6th	3845
1997	Ricky Rudd	10	Ford	DAY; 9	CAR; 4	RCH; 6	ATL; 30	DAR; 23	TEX; 5	BRI; 27	MAR; 13	SON; 34	TAL; 11	CLT; 10	DOV; 1	POC; 21	MCH; 13	CAL; 3	DAY; 34	NHA; 9	POC; 36	IND; 1	GLN; 40	MCH; 29	BRI; 19	DAR; 5	RCH; 28	NHA; 42	DOV; 6	MAR; 13	CLT; 41	TAL; 34	CAR; 40	PHO; 36	ATL; 37			17th	3330
1998	Ricky Rudd	10	Ford	DAY; 42	CAR; 43	LVS; 12	ATL; 23	DAR; 33	BRI; 30	TEX; 27	MAR; 14	TAL; 24	CAL; 11	CLT; 31	DOV; 6	RCH; 11	MCH; 37	POC; 41	SON; 28	NHA; 19	POC; 42	IND; 31	GLN; 14	MCH; 13	BRI; 9	NHA; 10	DAR; 22	RCH; 34	DOV; 13	MAR; 1	CLT; 37	TAL; 18	DAY; 27	PHO; 27	CAR; 10	ATL; 24		23rd	3131
1999	Ricky Rudd	10	Ford	DAY; 30	CAR; 30	LVS; 43	ATL; 25	DAR; 27	TEX; 19	BRI; 38	MAR; 29	TAL; 19	CAL; 41	RCH; 36	CLT; 28	DOV; 14	MCH; 38	POC; 15	SON; 38	DAY; 13	NHA; 27	POC; 27	IND; 9	GLN; 32	MCH; 38	BRI; 3	DAR; 34	RCH; 27	NHA; 42	DOV; 37	MAR; 18	CLT; 38	TAL; 3	CAR; 19	PHO; 5	HOM; 41	ATL; 7	31st	2922
