= 1997 Jiffy Lube 300 =

17th race of the 1997 NASCAR Winston Cup Series

Race details
- Race 17 of 32 in the 1997 NASCAR Winston Cup Series
- The 1997 Jiffy Lube 300 program cover, featuring Ernie Irvan.
- Date: July 13, 1997
- Location: Loudon, New Hampshire, New Hampshire International Speedway
- Course: Permanent racing facility
- Course length: 1.058 miles (1.704 km)
- Distance: 300 laps, 317.4 mi (510.805 km)
- Average speed: 117.134 miles per hour (188.509 km/h)

Pole position
Driver	Ken Schrader	Andy Petree Racing
- Time: 29.429

Most laps led
Driver	Jeff Burton	Roush Racing
- Laps: 99

Winner
No. 99	Jeff Burton	Roush Racing

Television in the United States
- Network: TNN
- Announcers: Eli Gold, Buddy Baker, Dick Berggren

Radio in the United States
- Radio: Motor Racing Network

The 1997 Jiffy Lube 300 was the 17th stock car race of the 1997 NASCAR Winston Cup Series and the fifth iteration of the event. The race was held on Sunday, July 13, 1997, in Loudon, New Hampshire, at New Hampshire International Speedway, a 1.058-mile (1.703 km) permanent, oval-shaped, low-banked racetrack. The race took the scheduled 300 laps to complete. At race's end, Roush Racing driver Jeff Burton would manage to dominate the final third of the race to take his second career NASCAR Winston Cup Series victory and his second victory of the season. To fill out the top three, Richard Childress Racing driver Dale Earnhardt and Penske Racing South driver Rusty Wallace would finish second and third, respectively.

== Background ==
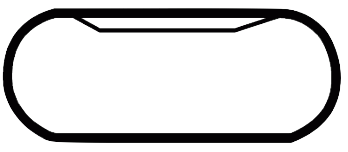
The layout of New Hampshire International Speedway, the venue where the race was held.

New Hampshire International Speedway is a 1.058-mile (1.703 km) oval speedway located in Loudon, New Hampshire which has hosted NASCAR racing annually since the early 1990s, as well as an IndyCar weekend and the oldest motorcycle race in North America, the Loudon Classic. Nicknamed "The Magic Mile", the speedway is often converted into a 1.6-mile (2.6 km) road course, which includes much of the oval. The track was originally the site of Bryar Motorsports Park before being purchased and redeveloped by Bob Bahre. The track is currently one of eight major NASCAR tracks owned and operated by Speedway Motorsports.

=== Entry list ===
- (R) denotes rookie driver.

#	Driver	Team	Make
1	Jerry Nadeau	Precision Products Racing	Pontiac
2	Rusty Wallace	Penske Racing South	Ford
3	Dale Earnhardt	Richard Childress Racing	Chevrolet
4	Sterling Marlin	Morgan–McClure Motorsports	Chevrolet
5	Terry Labonte	Hendrick Motorsports	Chevrolet
6	Mark Martin	Roush Racing	Ford
7	Geoff Bodine	Geoff Bodine Racing	Ford
8	Hut Stricklin	Stavola Brothers Racing	Ford
10	Ricky Rudd	Rudd Performance Motorsports	Ford
11	Brett Bodine	Brett Bodine Racing	Ford
16	Ted Musgrave	Roush Racing	Ford
17	Darrell Waltrip	Darrell Waltrip Motorsports	Chevrolet
18	Bobby Labonte	Joe Gibbs Racing	Pontiac
21	Michael Waltrip	Wood Brothers Racing	Ford
22	Ward Burton	Bill Davis Racing	Pontiac
23	Jimmy Spencer	Haas-Carter Motorsports	Ford
24	Jeff Gordon	Hendrick Motorsports	Chevrolet
25	Ricky Craven	Hendrick Motorsports	Chevrolet
28	Ernie Irvan	Robert Yates Racing	Ford
29	Jeff Green (R)	Diamond Ridge Motorsports	Chevrolet
30	Johnny Benson Jr.	Bahari Racing	Pontiac
31	Mike Skinner (R)	Richard Childress Racing	Chevrolet
33	Ken Schrader	Andy Petree Racing	Chevrolet
36	Derrike Cope	MB2 Motorsports	Pontiac
37	Jeremy Mayfield	Kranefuss-Haas Racing	Ford
40	Robby Gordon (R)	Team SABCO	Chevrolet
41	Steve Grissom	Larry Hedrick Motorsports	Chevrolet
42	Joe Nemechek	Team SABCO	Chevrolet
43	Bobby Hamilton	Petty Enterprises	Pontiac
44	Kyle Petty	Petty Enterprises	Pontiac
71	Dave Marcis	Marcis Auto Racing	Chevrolet
75	Rick Mast	Butch Mock Motorsports	Ford
77	Morgan Shepherd	Jasper Motorsports	Ford
78	Billy Standridge	Triad Motorsports	Ford
79	Randy MacDonald	T.R.I.X. Racing	Chevrolet
81	Kenny Wallace	FILMAR Racing	Ford
88	Dale Jarrett	Robert Yates Racing	Ford
90	Dick Trickle	Donlavey Racing	Ford
94	Bill Elliott	Bill Elliott Racing	Ford
96	David Green (R)	American Equipment Racing	Chevrolet
97	Chad Little	Mark Rypien Motorsports	Pontiac
98	John Andretti	Cale Yarborough Motorsports	Ford
99	Jeff Burton	Roush Racing	Ford

== Qualifying ==
Qualifying was split into two rounds. The first round was held on Friday, July 11. Each driver would have one lap to set a time. During the first round, the top 25 drivers in the round would be guaranteed a starting spot in the race. If a driver was not able to guarantee a spot in the first round, they had the option to scrub their time from the first round and try and run a faster lap time in a second round qualifying run, held on Saturday, July 12. As with the first round, each driver would have one lap to set a time. Positions 26-38 would be decided on time, and depending on who needed it, the 39th thru either the 42nd, 43rd, or 44th position would be based on provisionals. Four spots are awarded by the use of provisionals based on owner's points. The fifth is awarded to a past champion who has not otherwise qualified for the race. If no past champion needs the provisional, the field would be limited to 42 cars. If a champion needed it, the field would expand to 43 cars. If the race was a companion race with the NASCAR Winston West Series, four spots would be determined by NASCAR Winston Cup Series provisionals, while the final two spots would be given to teams in the Winston West Series, leaving the field at 44 cars.

Ken Schrader, driving for Andy Petree Racing, would win the pole, setting a time of 29.429 and an average speed of 129.423 miles per hour (208.286 km/h).

Billy Standridge was the only driver to fail to qualify.

=== Full qualifying results ===
Pos.	#	Driver	Team	Make	Time	Speed
1	33	Ken Schrader	Andy Petree Racing	Chevrolet	29.429	129.423
2	43	Bobby Hamilton	Petty Enterprises	Pontiac	29.440	129.375
3	25	Ricky Craven	Hendrick Motorsports	Chevrolet	29.463	129.274
4	97	Chad Little	Mark Rypien Motorsports	Pontiac	29.526	128.998
5	88	Dale Jarrett	Robert Yates Racing	Ford	29.530	128.981
6	41	Steve Grissom	Larry Hedrick Motorsports	Chevrolet	29.539	128.941
7	44	Kyle Petty	Petty Enterprises	Pontiac	29.542	128.928
8	98	John Andretti	Cale Yarborough Motorsports	Ford	29.542	128.928
9	1	Jerry Nadeau	Precision Products Racing	Pontiac	29.552	128.885
10	5	Terry Labonte	Hendrick Motorsports	Chevrolet	29.553	128.880
11	28	Ernie Irvan	Robert Yates Racing	Ford	29.591	128.715
12	2	Rusty Wallace	Penske Racing South	Ford	29.618	128.597
13	4	Sterling Marlin	Morgan–McClure Motorsports	Chevrolet	29.651	128.454
14	7	Geoff Bodine	Geoff Bodine Racing	Ford	29.691	128.281
15	99	Jeff Burton	Roush Racing	Ford	29.699	128.247
16	6	Mark Martin	Roush Racing	Ford	29.704	128.225
17	18	Bobby Labonte	Joe Gibbs Racing	Pontiac	29.733	128.100
18	10	Ricky Rudd	Rudd Performance Motorsports	Ford	29.733	128.100
19	42	Joe Nemechek	Team SABCO	Chevrolet	29.736	128.087
20	17	Darrell Waltrip	Darrell Waltrip Motorsports	Chevrolet	29.740	128.070
21	96	David Green (R)	American Equipment Racing	Chevrolet	29.751	128.023
22	37	Jeremy Mayfield	Kranefuss-Haas Racing	Ford	29.758	127.992
23	94	Bill Elliott	Bill Elliott Racing	Ford	29.767	127.954
24	75	Rick Mast	Butch Mock Motorsports	Ford	29.769	127.945
25	16	Ted Musgrave	Roush Racing	Ford	29.787	127.868
26	3	Dale Earnhardt	Richard Childress Racing	Chevrolet	29.789	127.859
27	31	Mike Skinner (R)	Richard Childress Racing	Chevrolet	29.790	127.855
28	90	Dick Trickle	Donlavey Racing	Ford	29.798	127.821
29	24	Jeff Gordon	Hendrick Motorsports	Chevrolet	29.806	127.786
30	23	Jimmy Spencer	Travis Carter Enterprises	Ford	29.841	127.636
31	36	Derrike Cope	MB2 Motorsports	Pontiac	29.854	127.581
32	30	Johnny Benson Jr.	Bahari Racing	Pontiac	29.858	127.564
33	21	Michael Waltrip	Wood Brothers Racing	Ford	29.870	127.513
34	29	Jeff Green (R)	Diamond Ridge Motorsports	Chevrolet	29.875	127.491
35	22	Ward Burton	Bill Davis Racing	Pontiac	29.897	127.397
36	81	Kenny Wallace	FILMAR Racing	Ford	29.934	127.240
37	79	Randy MacDonald	T.R.I.X. Racing	Chevrolet	29.942	127.206
38	77	Morgan Shepherd	Jasper Motorsports	Ford	30.209	126.082
Provisionals
39	11	Brett Bodine	Brett Bodine Racing	Ford	-*	-*
40	8	Hut Stricklin	Stavola Brothers Racing	Ford	-*	-*
41	71	Dave Marcis	Marcis Auto Racing	Chevrolet	-*	-*
42	40	Robby Gordon (R)	Team SABCO	Chevrolet	-*	-*
Failed to qualify
43	78	Billy Standridge	Triad Motorsports	Ford	-*	-*
Official qualifying results

== Race results ==
Fin	St	#	Driver	Team	Make	Laps	Led	Status	Pts	Winnings
1	15	99	Jeff Burton	Roush Racing	Ford	300	99	running	185	$117,875
2	26	3	Dale Earnhardt	Richard Childress Racing	Chevrolet	300	0	running	170	$82,950
3	12	2	Rusty Wallace	Penske Racing South	Ford	300	0	running	165	$55,525
4	6	41	Steve Grissom	Larry Hedrick Motorsports	Chevrolet	300	0	running	160	$47,675
5	16	6	Mark Martin	Roush Racing	Ford	300	0	running	155	$44,650
6	23	94	Bill Elliott	Bill Elliott Racing	Ford	300	0	running	150	$39,825
7	10	5	Terry Labonte	Hendrick Motorsports	Chevrolet	300	4	running	151	$46,325
8	11	28	Ernie Irvan	Robert Yates Racing	Ford	300	42	running	147	$38,625
9	18	10	Ricky Rudd	Rudd Performance Motorsports	Ford	300	0	running	138	$38,325
10	14	7	Geoff Bodine	Geoff Bodine Racing	Ford	300	0	running	134	$38,225
11	1	33	Ken Schrader	Andy Petree Racing	Chevrolet	300	12	running	135	$40,825
12	30	23	Jimmy Spencer	Travis Carter Enterprises	Ford	300	0	running	127	$35,025
13	7	44	Kyle Petty	Petty Enterprises	Pontiac	300	0	running	124	$26,725
14	8	98	John Andretti	Cale Yarborough Motorsports	Ford	299	1	crash	126	$33,425
15	40	8	Hut Stricklin	Stavola Brothers Racing	Ford	299	0	running	118	$34,525
16	3	25	Ricky Craven	Hendrick Motorsports	Chevrolet	299	1	running	120	$34,225
17	22	37	Jeremy Mayfield	Kranefuss-Haas Racing	Ford	299	0	running	112	$25,400
18	32	30	Johnny Benson Jr.	Bahari Racing	Pontiac	299	0	running	109	$32,150
19	36	81	Kenny Wallace	FILMAR Racing	Ford	299	0	running	106	$31,900
20	31	36	Derrike Cope	MB2 Motorsports	Pontiac	299	0	running	103	$26,600
21	27	31	Mike Skinner (R)	Richard Childress Racing	Chevrolet	298	0	running	100	$25,375
22	13	4	Sterling Marlin	Morgan–McClure Motorsports	Chevrolet	298	0	running	97	$36,925
23	29	24	Jeff Gordon	Hendrick Motorsports	Chevrolet	298	0	running	94	$37,975
24	21	96	David Green (R)	American Equipment Racing	Chevrolet	298	0	running	91	$20,625
25	28	90	Dick Trickle	Donlavey Racing	Ford	298	0	running	88	$23,675
26	25	16	Ted Musgrave	Roush Racing	Ford	298	0	running	85	$30,425
27	17	18	Bobby Labonte	Joe Gibbs Racing	Pontiac	298	0	running	82	$35,150
28	24	75	Rick Mast	Butch Mock Motorsports	Ford	298	0	running	79	$30,000
29	33	21	Michael Waltrip	Wood Brothers Racing	Ford	297	0	running	76	$29,850
30	4	97	Chad Little	Mark Rypien Motorsports	Pontiac	297	0	running	73	$22,225
31	2	43	Bobby Hamilton	Petty Enterprises	Pontiac	297	43	running	75	$37,100
32	34	29	Jeff Green (R)	Diamond Ridge Motorsports	Chevrolet	296	0	running	67	$19,475
33	20	17	Darrell Waltrip	Darrell Waltrip Motorsports	Chevrolet	296	0	running	64	$26,350
34	42	40	Robby Gordon (R)	Team SABCO	Chevrolet	296	0	running	61	$26,225
35	41	71	Dave Marcis	Marcis Auto Racing	Chevrolet	295	0	running	58	$19,100
36	35	22	Ward Burton	Bill Davis Racing	Pontiac	294	0	running	55	$25,975
37	38	77	Morgan Shepherd	Jasper Motorsports	Ford	293	0	running	52	$18,850
38	5	88	Dale Jarrett	Robert Yates Racing	Ford	293	98	running	54	$51,900
39	9	1	Jerry Nadeau	Precision Products Racing	Pontiac	281	0	brakes	46	$25,600
40	19	42	Joe Nemechek	Team SABCO	Chevrolet	275	0	running	43	$18,600
41	37	79	Randy MacDonald	T.R.I.X. Racing	Chevrolet	148	0	brakes	40	$18,600
42	39	11	Brett Bodine	Brett Bodine Racing	Ford	55	0	electrical	37	$25,600
Official race results

Previous race: 1997 Pepsi 400	NASCAR Winston Cup Series; 1997 season	Next race: 1997 Pennsylvania 400
