= 1997 Pepsi 400 =

16th race of the 1997 NASCAR Winston Cup Series

Race details
- Race 16 of 32 in the 1997 NASCAR Winston Cup Series
- The 1997 Pepsi 400 program cover, featuring Jeff Gordon.
- Date: July 5, 1997
- Location: Daytona Beach, Florida, Daytona International Speedway
- Course: Permanent racing facility
- Course length: 2.5 miles (4.0 km)
- Distance: 160 laps, 400 mi (643.737 km)
- Average speed: 157.791 miles per hour (253.940 km/h)

Pole position
Driver	Mike Skinner	Richard Childress Racing
- Time: 47.424

Most laps led
Driver	John Andretti	Cale Yarborough Motorsports
- Laps: 113

Winner
No. 98	John Andretti	Cale Yarborough Motorsports

Television in the United States
- Network: ESPN
- Announcers: Bob Jenkins, Benny Parsons

Radio in the United States
- Radio: Motor Racing Network

The 1997 Pepsi 400 was the 16th stock car race of the 1997 NASCAR Winston Cup Series and the 29th iteration of the event. The race was held on Saturday, July 5, 1997, in Daytona Beach, Florida at Daytona International Speedway, a 2.5 miles (4.0 km) permanent triangular-shaped superspeedway. The race took the scheduled 160 laps to complete. In a one-lap restart to the finish, Cale Yarborough Motorsports driver John Andretti would manage to defend the field in a close finish to take his first career NASCAR Winston Cup Series victory, his only victory of the season and the only win in team history for Cale Yarborough Motorsports. To fill out the top three, Hendrick Motorsports driver Terry Labonte and Morgan–McClure Motorsports driver Sterling Marlin would finish second and third, respectively.

== Background ==
The layout of Daytona International Speedway, the venue where the race was held.

Daytona International Speedway is one of four superspeedways to hold NASCAR races, the other three being Indianapolis Motor Speedway, Talladega Superspeedway and Atlanta Motor Speedway. The standard track at Daytona International Speedway is a four-turn superspeedway that is 2.5 miles (4.0 km) long. The track's turns are banked at 31 degrees, while the front stretch, the location of the finish line, is banked at 18 degrees.

=== Entry list ===
- (R) denotes rookie driver.

#	Driver	Team	Make
1	Jerry Nadeau	Precision Products Racing	Pontiac
2	Rusty Wallace	Penske Racing South	Ford
3	Dale Earnhardt	Richard Childress Racing	Chevrolet
4	Sterling Marlin	Morgan–McClure Motorsports	Chevrolet
5	Terry Labonte	Hendrick Motorsports	Chevrolet
6	Mark Martin	Roush Racing	Ford
7	Geoff Bodine	Mattei Motorsports	Ford
8	Hut Stricklin	Stavola Brothers Racing	Ford
9	Lake Speed	Melling Racing	Ford
10	Ricky Rudd	Rudd Performance Motorsports	Ford
11	Brett Bodine	Brett Bodine Racing	Ford
16	Ted Musgrave	Roush Racing	Ford
17	Darrell Waltrip	Darrell Waltrip Motorsports	Chevrolet
18	Bobby Labonte	Joe Gibbs Racing	Pontiac
21	Michael Waltrip	Wood Brothers Racing	Ford
22	Ward Burton	Bill Davis Racing	Pontiac
23	Jimmy Spencer	Haas-Carter Motorsports	Ford
24	Jeff Gordon	Hendrick Motorsports	Chevrolet
25	Ricky Craven	Hendrick Motorsports	Chevrolet
28	Ernie Irvan	Robert Yates Racing	Ford
29	Jeff Green (R)	Diamond Ridge Motorsports	Chevrolet
30	Johnny Benson Jr.	Bahari Racing	Pontiac
31	Mike Skinner (R)	Richard Childress Racing	Chevrolet
33	Ken Schrader	Andy Petree Racing	Chevrolet
36	Derrike Cope	MB2 Motorsports	Pontiac
37	Jeremy Mayfield	Kranefuss-Haas Racing	Ford
40	Greg Sacks	Team SABCO	Chevrolet
41	Steve Grissom	Larry Hedrick Motorsports	Chevrolet
42	Joe Nemechek	Team SABCO	Chevrolet
43	Bobby Hamilton	Petty Enterprises	Pontiac
44	Kyle Petty	Petty Enterprises	Pontiac
46	Wally Dallenbach Jr.	Team SABCO	Chevrolet
71	Dave Marcis	Marcis Auto Racing	Chevrolet
75	Rick Mast	Butch Mock Motorsports	Ford
77	Morgan Shepherd	Jasper Motorsports	Ford
78	Billy Standridge	Triad Motorsports	Ford
81	Kenny Wallace	FILMAR Racing	Ford
88	Dale Jarrett	Robert Yates Racing	Ford
90	Dick Trickle	Donlavey Racing	Ford
91	Loy Allen Jr.	LJ Racing	Chevrolet
94	Bill Elliott	Bill Elliott Racing	Ford
96	David Green (R)	American Equipment Racing	Chevrolet
97	Chad Little	Mark Rypien Motorsports	Pontiac
98	John Andretti	Cale Yarborough Motorsports	Ford
99	Jeff Burton	Roush Racing	Ford

== Qualifying ==
Qualifying was split into two rounds. The first round was held on Thursday, July 3, at 3:00 PM EST. Each driver would have one lap to set a time. During the first round, the top 25 drivers in the round would be guaranteed a starting spot in the race. If a driver was not able to guarantee a spot in the first round, they had the option to scrub their time from the first round and try and run a faster lap time in a second round qualifying run, held on Friday, July 4. As with the first round, each driver would have one lap to set a time. Positions 26-38 would be decided on time, and depending on who needed it, the 39th thru either the 42nd, 43rd, or 44th position would be based on provisionals. Four spots are awarded by the use of provisionals based on owner's points. The fifth is awarded to a past champion who has not otherwise qualified for the race. If no past champion needs the provisional, the field would be limited to 42 cars. If a champion needed it, the field would expand to 43 cars. If the race was a companion race with the NASCAR Winston West Series, four spots would be determined by NASCAR Winston Cup Series provisionals, while the final two spots would be given to teams in the Winston West Series, leaving the field at 44 cars.

Mike Skinner, driving for Richard Childress Racing, would win the pole, setting a time of 47.424 and an average speed of 189.777 miles per hour (305.416 km/h).

Three drivers would fail to qualify: Loy Allen Jr., Geoff Bodine, and Jeff Green.

=== Full qualifying results ===
Pos.	#	Driver	Team	Make	Time	Speed
1	31	Mike Skinner (R)	Richard Childress Racing	Chevrolet	47.424	189.777
2	3	Dale Earnhardt	Richard Childress Racing	Chevrolet	47.428	189.761
3	98	John Andretti	Cale Yarborough Motorsports	Ford	47.513	189.422
4	24	Jeff Gordon	Hendrick Motorsports	Chevrolet	47.529	189.358
5	23	Jimmy Spencer	Travis Carter Enterprises	Ford	47.618	189.004
6	2	Rusty Wallace	Penske Racing South	Ford	47.656	188.853
7	78	Billy Standridge	Triad Motorsports	Ford	47.672	188.790
8	21	Michael Waltrip	Wood Brothers Racing	Ford	47.673	188.786
9	75	Rick Mast	Butch Mock Motorsports	Ford	47.678	188.766
10	9	Lake Speed	Melling Racing	Ford	47.720	188.600
11	42	Joe Nemechek	Team SABCO	Chevrolet	47.751	188.478
12	90	Dick Trickle	Donlavey Racing	Ford	47.755	188.462
13	10	Ricky Rudd	Rudd Performance Motorsports	Ford	47.815	188.225
14	33	Ken Schrader	Andy Petree Racing	Chevrolet	47.854	188.072
15	30	Johnny Benson Jr.	Bahari Racing	Pontiac	47.859	188.052
16	88	Dale Jarrett	Robert Yates Racing	Ford	47.878	187.978
17	94	Bill Elliott	Bill Elliott Racing	Ford	47.913	187.840
18	6	Mark Martin	Roush Racing	Ford	47.915	187.833
19	8	Hut Stricklin	Stavola Brothers Racing	Ford	47.954	187.680
20	18	Bobby Labonte	Joe Gibbs Racing	Pontiac	47.958	187.664
21	22	Ward Burton	Bill Davis Racing	Pontiac	47.971	187.613
22	16	Ted Musgrave	Roush Racing	Ford	48.020	187.422
23	99	Jeff Burton	Roush Racing	Ford	48.027	187.395
24	28	Ernie Irvan	Robert Yates Racing	Ford	48.027	187.395
25	43	Bobby Hamilton	Petty Enterprises	Pontiac	48.066	187.243
26	40	Robby Gordon	Team SABCO	Chevrolet	48.071	187.223
27	81	Kenny Wallace	FILMAR Racing	Ford	48.095	187.130
28	36	Derrike Cope	MB2 Motorsports	Pontiac	48.124	187.017
29	97	Chad Little	Mark Rypien Motorsports	Pontiac	48.171	186.834
30	4	Sterling Marlin	Morgan–McClure Motorsports	Chevrolet	48.177	186.811
31	37	Jeremy Mayfield	Kranefuss-Haas Racing	Ford	48.187	186.772
32	77	Morgan Shepherd	Jasper Motorsports	Ford	48.208	186.691
33	46	Wally Dallenbach Jr.	Team SABCO	Chevrolet	48.271	186.447
34	17	Darrell Waltrip	Darrell Waltrip Motorsports	Chevrolet	48.318	186.266
35	5	Terry Labonte	Hendrick Motorsports	Chevrolet	48.334	186.204
36	96	David Green (R)	American Equipment Racing	Chevrolet	48.345	186.162
37	71	Dave Marcis	Marcis Auto Racing	Chevrolet	48.377	186.039
38	44	Kyle Petty	Petty Enterprises	Pontiac	48.393	185.977
Provisionals
39	25	Ricky Craven	Hendrick Motorsports	Chevrolet	-*	-*
40	11	Brett Bodine	Brett Bodine Racing	Ford	-*	-*
41	1	Jerry Nadeau	Precision Products Racing	Pontiac	-*	-*
42	41	Steve Grissom	Larry Hedrick Motorsports	Chevrolet	-*	-*
Failed to qualify
43	91	Loy Allen Jr.	LJ Racing	Chevrolet	-*	-*
44	7	Geoff Bodine	Geoff Bodine Racing	Ford	-*	-*
45	29	Jeff Green (R)	Diamond Ridge Motorsports	Chevrolet	-*	-*
Official qualifying results

== Race results ==
Fin	St	#	Driver	Team	Make	Laps	Led	Status	Pts	Winnings
1	3	98	John Andretti	Cale Yarborough Motorsports	Ford	160	113	running	185	$109,525
2	35	5	Terry Labonte	Hendrick Motorsports	Chevrolet	160	0	running	170	$74,975
3	30	4	Sterling Marlin	Morgan–McClure Motorsports	Chevrolet	160	0	running	165	$53,775
4	2	3	Dale Earnhardt	Richard Childress Racing	Chevrolet	160	7	running	165	$52,475
5	16	88	Dale Jarrett	Robert Yates Racing	Ford	160	0	running	155	$45,975
6	6	2	Rusty Wallace	Penske Racing South	Ford	160	0	running	150	$40,850
7	38	44	Kyle Petty	Petty Enterprises	Pontiac	160	2	running	151	$30,550
8	23	99	Jeff Burton	Roush Racing	Ford	160	0	running	142	$36,500
9	24	28	Ernie Irvan	Robert Yates Racing	Ford	160	0	running	138	$35,500
10	20	18	Bobby Labonte	Joe Gibbs Racing	Pontiac	160	0	running	134	$40,000
11	27	81	Kenny Wallace	FILMAR Racing	Ford	160	0	running	130	$30,565
12	22	16	Ted Musgrave	Roush Racing	Ford	160	0	running	127	$29,975
13	31	37	Jeremy Mayfield	Kranefuss-Haas Racing	Ford	160	0	running	124	$22,585
14	34	17	Darrell Waltrip	Darrell Waltrip Motorsports	Chevrolet	160	1	running	126	$29,245
15	14	33	Ken Schrader	Andy Petree Racing	Chevrolet	160	0	running	118	$30,455
16	15	30	Johnny Benson Jr.	Bahari Racing	Pontiac	160	0	running	115	$28,615
17	37	71	Dave Marcis	Marcis Auto Racing	Chevrolet	160	0	running	112	$23,175
18	9	75	Rick Mast	Butch Mock Motorsports	Ford	160	0	running	109	$27,860
19	36	96	David Green (R)	American Equipment Racing	Chevrolet	160	0	running	106	$17,920
20	25	43	Bobby Hamilton	Petty Enterprises	Pontiac	160	0	running	103	$32,655
21	4	24	Jeff Gordon	Hendrick Motorsports	Chevrolet	160	1	running	105	$85,135
22	26	40	Robby Gordon	Team SABCO	Chevrolet	160	0	running	97	$26,915
23	40	11	Brett Bodine	Brett Bodine Racing	Ford	160	1	running	99	$26,545
24	11	42	Joe Nemechek	Team SABCO	Chevrolet	160	0	running	91	$19,325
25	12	90	Dick Trickle	Donlavey Racing	Ford	159	0	crash	88	$19,080
26	21	22	Ward Burton	Bill Davis Racing	Pontiac	159	4	crash	90	$25,820
27	18	6	Mark Martin	Roush Racing	Ford	159	26	crash	87	$30,465
28	28	36	Derrike Cope	MB2 Motorsports	Pontiac	159	0	crash	79	$18,445
29	10	9	Lake Speed	Melling Racing	Ford	159	0	crash	76	$18,225
30	41	1	Jerry Nadeau	Precision Products Racing	Pontiac	159	0	crash	73	$25,130
31	5	23	Jimmy Spencer	Travis Carter Enterprises	Ford	159	0	running	70	$24,575
32	32	77	Morgan Shepherd	Jasper Motorsports	Ford	159	0	running	67	$15,045
33	17	94	Bill Elliott	Bill Elliott Racing	Ford	158	2	running	69	$22,015
34	13	10	Ricky Rudd	Rudd Performance Motorsports	Ford	155	0	crash	61	$29,985
35	8	21	Michael Waltrip	Wood Brothers Racing	Ford	155	1	crash	63	$21,955
36	19	8	Hut Stricklin	Stavola Brothers Racing	Ford	155	0	crash	55	$21,925
37	39	25	Ricky Craven	Hendrick Motorsports	Chevrolet	155	0	running	52	$21,896
38	42	41	Steve Grissom	Larry Hedrick Motorsports	Chevrolet	153	0	running	49	$21,850
39	33	46	Wally Dallenbach Jr.	Team SABCO	Chevrolet	149	0	running	46	$14,850
40	7	78	Billy Standridge	Triad Motorsports	Ford	39	0	crash	43	$14,850
41	1	31	Mike Skinner (R)	Richard Childress Racing	Chevrolet	37	2	crash	45	$21,850
42	29	97	Chad Little	Mark Rypien Motorsports	Pontiac	32	0	crash	37	$15,350
Official race results

Previous race: 1997 California 500	NASCAR Winston Cup Series; 1997 season	Next race: 1997 Jiffy Lube 300
