= 1997 NASCAR Winston Cup Series =

American motorsport season

Seasons
- ← 1996 1998 →

The 1997 NASCAR Winston Cup Series was the 49th season of professional stock car racing in the United States and the 26th modern-era NASCAR Cup series. It began on February 9 and ended on November 16. Jeff Gordon of Hendrick Motorsports won his second Cup championship at the end of the season.

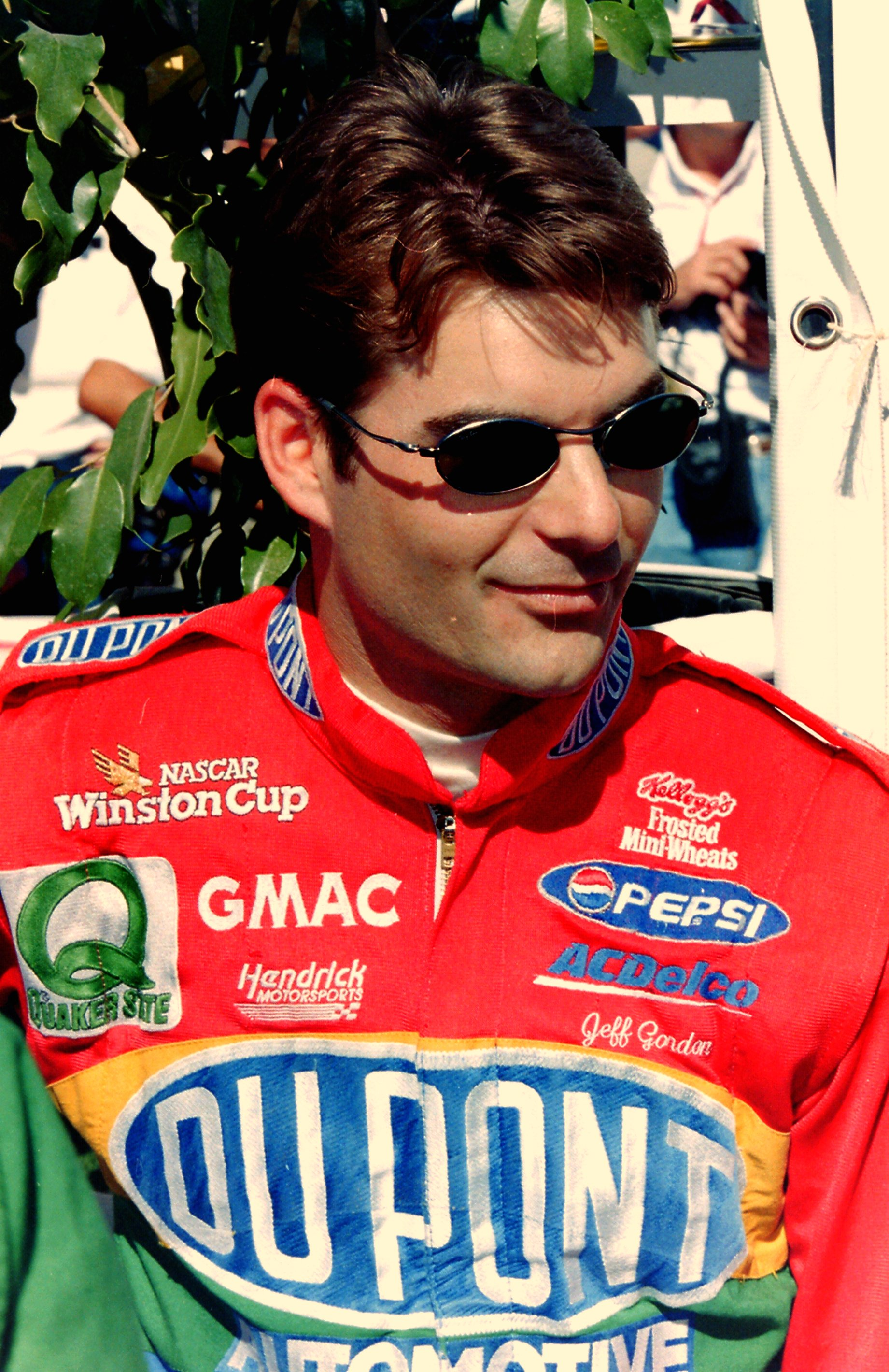
1997 Winston Cup champion Jeff Gordon

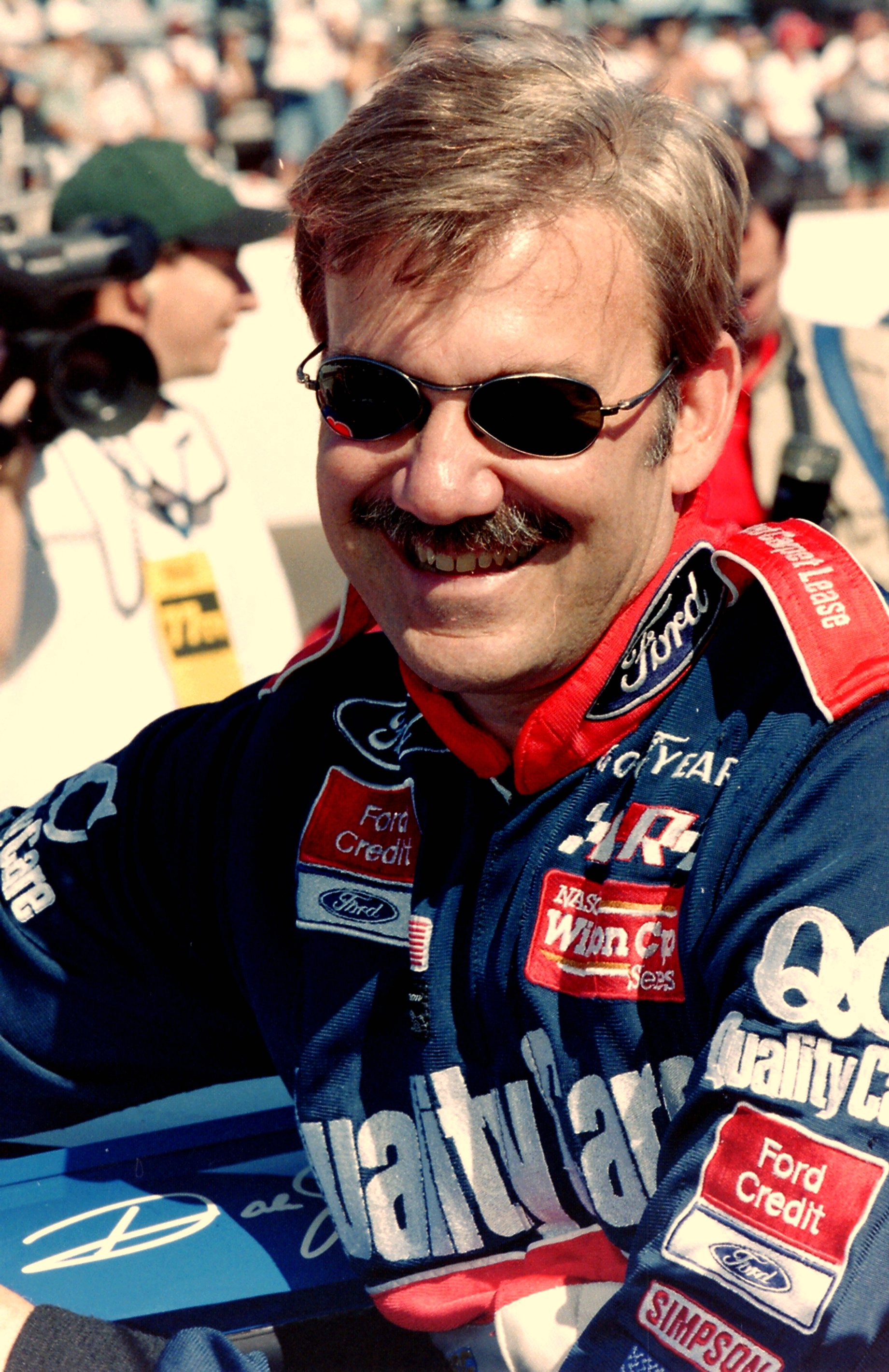
Dale Jarrett finished second behind Gordon by only 14 points

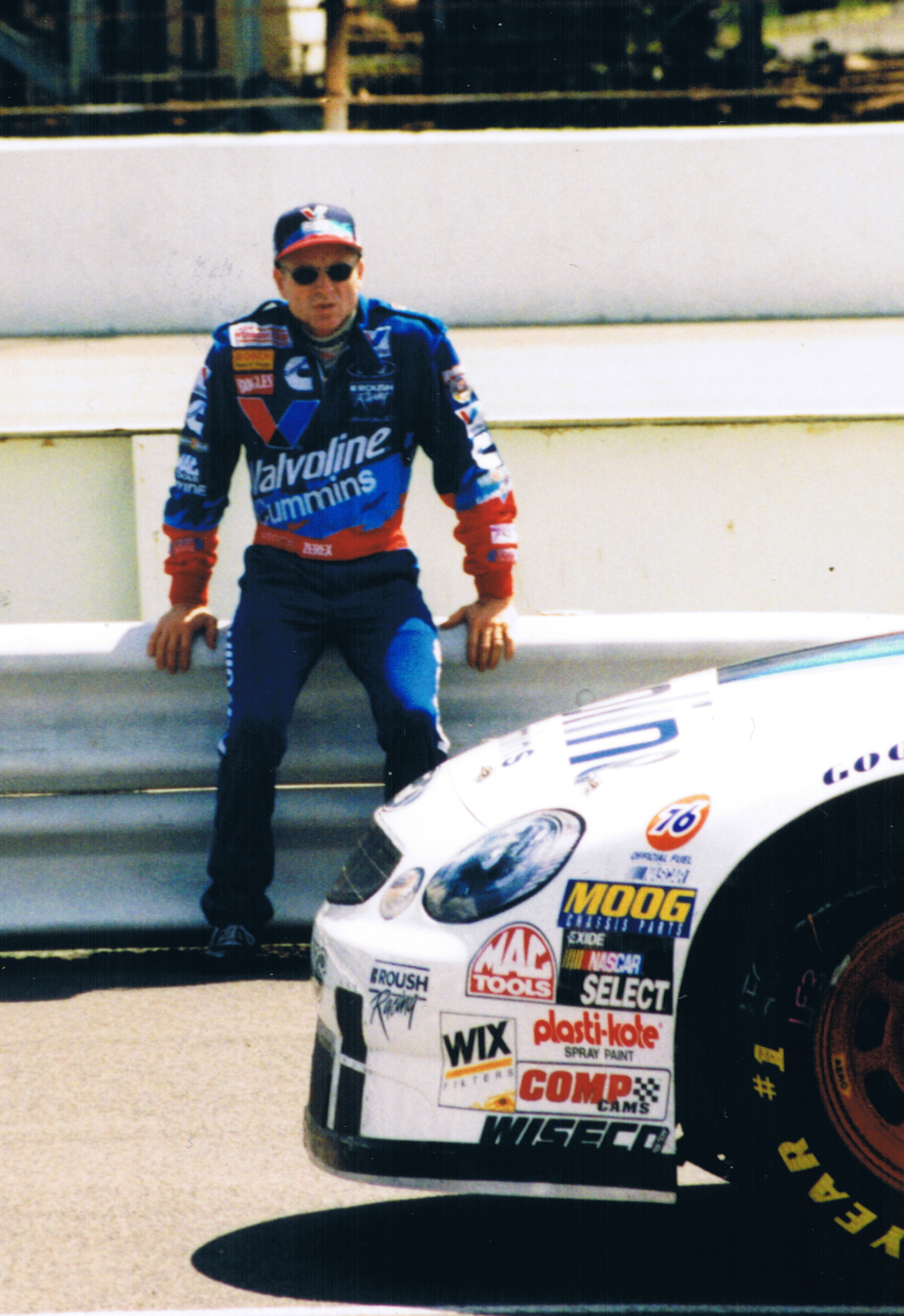
Mark Martin finished third in the championship

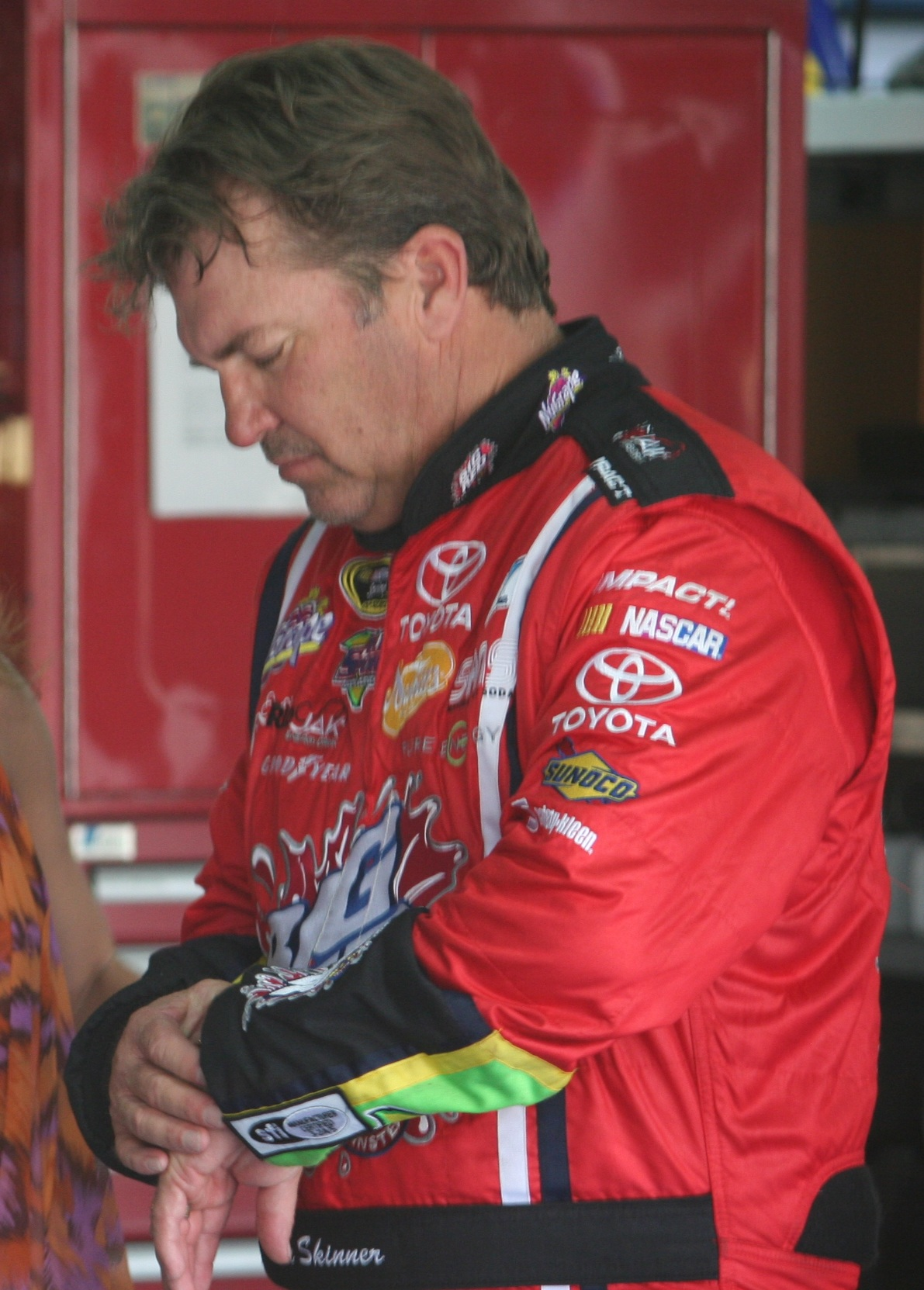
Mike Skinner, the 1997 Winston Cup Rookie of the Year.

== Teams and drivers ==
=== Complete schedule ===
Manufacturer	Team	No.	Race driver	Crew chief
Chevrolet	American Equipment Racing	96	David Green (R)	Sammy Johns
Chevrolet	Andy Petree Racing	33	Ken Schrader	Andy Petree
Chevrolet	Darrell Waltrip Motorsports	17	Darrell Waltrip	Jeff Hammond
Chevrolet	Diamond Ridge Motorsports	29	Robert Pressley 10	Wes Ward
Chevrolet	Diamond Ridge Motorsports	29	Jeff Green 22	Wes Ward
Chevrolet	Hendrick Motorsports	5	Terry Labonte	Gary DeHart
Chevrolet	Hendrick Motorsports	24	Jeff Gordon	Ray Evernham
Chevrolet	Hendrick Motorsports	25	Ricky Craven 30	Phil Hammer 1 Andy Graves 31
Chevrolet	Hendrick Motorsports	25	Todd Bodine 1	Phil Hammer 1 Andy Graves 31
Chevrolet	Hendrick Motorsports	25	Jack Sprague 1	Phil Hammer 1 Andy Graves 31
Chevrolet	Larry Hedrick Motorsports	41	Steve Grissom	Charley Pressley
Chevrolet	Marcis Auto Racing	71	Dave Marcis	Bob Marcis
Chevrolet	Morgan-McClure Motorsports	4	Sterling Marlin	Robert Larkins
Chevrolet	Richard Childress Racing	3	Dale Earnhardt	Larry McReynolds
Chevrolet	Richard Childress Racing	31	Mike Skinner (R)	Kevin Hamlin
Chevrolet	Team SABCO	40	Robby Gordon (R) 21	Mike Hillman
Chevrolet	Team SABCO	40	Joe Nemechek 1	Mike Hillman
Chevrolet	Team SABCO	40	Wally Dallenbach Jr. 1	Mike Hillman
Chevrolet	Team SABCO	40	Greg Sacks 7	Mike Hillman
Chevrolet	Team SABCO	40	Steve Park 1	Mike Hillman
Chevrolet	Team SABCO	40	Elliott Sadler 1	Mike Hillman
Chevrolet	Team SABCO	42	Joe Nemechek 31	Tony Glover
Chevrolet	Team SABCO	42	Phil Parsons 1	Tony Glover
Ford	Bill Elliott Racing	94	Bill Elliott	Mike Beam
Ford	Brett Bodine Racing	11	Brett Bodine	Donnie Richeson
Ford	Butch Mock Motorsports	75	Rick Mast	Dave Charpentier
Ford	Cale Yarborough Motorsports	98	John Andretti	Tony Furr
Ford	Donlavey Racing	90	Dick Trickle 31	Bob Johnson 4 Tommy Baldwin Jr. 21
Ford	Donlavey Racing	90	Dorsey Schroeder 1	Bob Johnson 4 Tommy Baldwin Jr. 21
Ford	FILMAR Racing	81	Kenny Wallace	Newt Moore
Ford	Geoff Bodine Racing	7	Geoff Bodine 31	Pat Tryson
Ford	Geoff Bodine Racing	7	Todd Bodine 1	Pat Tryson
Ford	Jasper Motorsports	77	Bobby Hillin Jr. 13	Terry Whooten
Ford	Jasper Motorsports	77	Morgan Shepherd 11	Terry Whooten
Ford	Jasper Motorsports	77	Robert Pressley 8	Terry Whooten
Ford	Kranefuss-Haas Racing	37	Jeremy Mayfield	Paul Andrews
Ford	Penske Racing South	2	Rusty Wallace	Robin Pemberton
Ford	Robert Yates Racing	28	Ernie Irvan	Marc Reno
Ford	Robert Yates Racing	88	Dale Jarrett	Todd Parrott
Ford	Rudd Performance Motorsports	10	Ricky Rudd	Jim Long
Ford	Stavola Brothers Racing	8	Hut Stricklin	Bill Ingle
Ford	Travis Carter Enterprises	23	Jimmy Spencer	Donnie Wingo
Ford	Triad Motorsports	78	Billy Standridge 16	Bill Hayes 7 Bob Johnson 20
Ford	Triad Motorsports	78	Tom Hubert 1	Bill Hayes 7 Bob Johnson 20
Ford	Triad Motorsports	78	Bobby Hillin Jr. 3	Bill Hayes 7 Bob Johnson 20
Ford	Triad Motorsports	78	Gary Bradberry 12	Bill Hayes 7 Bob Johnson 20
Ford	Wood Brothers Racing	21	Michael Waltrip	Leonard Wood
Ford	Roush Racing	6	Mark Martin	Jimmy Fennig
Ford	Roush Racing	16	Ted Musgrave	James Ince
Ford	Roush Racing	99	Jeff Burton	Buddy Parrott
Ford	Roush Racing	97	Chad Little All	Harold Holly
Pontiac	Mark Rypien Motorsports	97	Chad Little All	Harold Holly
Pontiac	Bahari Racing	30	Johnny Benson	Doug Hewitt
Pontiac	Bill Davis Racing	22	Ward Burton	Chris Hussey
Pontiac	Joe Gibbs Racing	18	Bobby Labonte	Jimmy Makar
Pontiac	MB2 Motorsports	36	Derrike Cope	Ryan Pemberton
Pontiac	Petty Enterprises	43	Bobby Hamilton	Robbie Loomis
Pontiac	PE2	44	Kyle Petty	Bobby Kennedy
Pontiac	Precision Products Racing	1	Morgan Shepherd 20	Michael McSwain
Pontiac	Precision Products Racing	1	Jerry Nadeau 5	Michael McSwain
Pontiac	Precision Products Racing	1	Mike Wallace 1	Michael McSwain
Pontiac	Precision Products Racing	1	Lance Hooper 6	Michael McSwain

=== Limited schedule ===
Manufacturer	Team	No.	Race driver	Crew chief	Races
Chevrolet	BACE Motorsports	74	Randy LaJoie		1
Chevrolet	Barkdoll Racing	73	Joe Nemechek		1
Chevrolet	Barkdoll Racing	73	Phil Barkdoll		1
Chevrolet	Dale Earnhardt, Inc.	14	Steve Park	Philippe Lopez	8
Chevrolet	Darrell Waltrip Motorsports	26	Rich Bickle	Dave McCarty	1
Chevrolet	Ken Schrader Racing	52	Jack Sprague		1
Chevrolet	LAR Motorsports	12	Jeff Purvis	Philippe Lopez	3
Chevrolet	LJ Racing	91	Mike Wallace	Doug Richert ?	15
Chevrolet	LJ Racing	91	Loy Allen Jr.	Doug Richert ?	1
Chevrolet	LJ Racing	91	Greg Sacks	Doug Richert ?	2
Chevrolet	LJ Racing	91	Ron Hornaday Jr.	Doug Richert ?	1
Chevrolet	LJ Racing	91	Kevin Lepage	Doug Richert ?	4
Chevrolet	Miller Racing	08	Mike Miller		1
Chevrolet	Norm Benning Racing	84	Norm Benning		1
Chevrolet	Team SABCO	46	Wally Dallenbach Jr.	Terry Shirley	24
Chevrolet	T.R.I.X. Racing	79	Randy MacDonald		3
Ford	A. J. Foyt Enterprises	50	A. J. Foyt		1
Ford	Bill Elliott Racing	92	Ron Barfield		1
Ford	Bud Moore Engineering	15	Larry Pearson		2
Ford	Bud Moore Engineering	15	Greg Sacks		1
Ford	David Blair Motorsports	27	Rick Wilson	Slugger Labbe	4
Ford	David Blair Motorsports	27	Kenny Irwin Jr.	Slugger Labbe	5
Ford	H. L. Waters Racing	0	Delma Cowart		1
Ford	H. S. Die Racing Team	61	Tim Steele		1
Ford	Melling Racing	9	Lake Speed	Jeff Buice	25
Ford	Melling Racing	9	Jeff Davis	Jeff Buice	1
Ford	Ranier-Walsh Racing	20	Greg Sacks	Tommy Baldwin Jr.	8
Ford	Ranier-Walsh Racing	20	Lance Hooper	Tommy Baldwin Jr.	2
Ford	Sadler Brothers Racing	95	Gary Bradberry	Lee Leslie	2
Ford	Sadler Brothers Racing	95	Ed Berrier	Lee Leslie	12
Ford	Standridge Motorsports	47	Billy Standridge		1
Ford	TriStar Motorsports	19	Loy Allen Jr.	Peter Sospenzo	2
Ford	TriStar Motorsports	19	Gary Bradberry	Peter Sospenzo	12
Ford	Ultra Motorsports	02	Mike Bliss		2
Pontiac	Bailey Racing	66	H. B. Bailey		1
Pontiac	Buckshot Racing	00	Buckshot Jones	Ricky Pearson	1
Pontiac	ISM Racing	35	Todd Bodine		2

== Schedule ==
No.	Race title	Track	Date
	Busch Clash	Daytona International Speedway, Daytona Beach	February 9
	Gatorade 125s	Daytona International Speedway, Daytona Beach	February 13
1	Daytona 500	Daytona International Speedway, Daytona Beach	February 16
2	Goodwrench Service 400	North Carolina Motor Speedway, Rockingham	February 23
3	Pontiac Excitement 400	Richmond International Raceway, Richmond	March 2
4	Primestar 500	Atlanta Motor Speedway, Hampton	March 9
5	TranSouth Financial 400	Darlington Raceway, Darlington	March 23
6	Interstate Batteries 500	Texas Motor Speedway, Fort Worth	April 6
7	Food City 500	Bristol Motor Speedway, Bristol	April 13
8	Goody's Headache Powder 500	Martinsville Speedway, Ridgeway	April 20
9	Save Mart Supermarkets 300	Sears Point Raceway, Sonoma	May 4
10	Winston 500	Talladega Superspeedway, Talladega	May 10
	Winston Open	Charlotte Motor Speedway, Concord	May 17
	The Winston	Charlotte Motor Speedway, Concord	May 17
11	Coca-Cola 600	Charlotte Motor Speedway, Concord	May 25
12	Miller 500	Dover Downs International Speedway, Dover	June 1
13	Pocono 500	Pocono Raceway, Long Pond	June 8
14	Miller 400	Michigan Speedway, Brooklyn	June 15
15	California 500 presented by NAPA	California Speedway, Fontana	June 22
16	Pepsi 400	Daytona International Speedway, Daytona Beach	July 5
17	Jiffy Lube 300	New Hampshire International Speedway, Loudon	July 13
18	Pennsylvania 500	Pocono Raceway, Long Pond	July 20
19	Brickyard 400	Indianapolis Motor Speedway, Speedway	August 2
20	The Bud at The Glen	Watkins Glen International, Watkins Glen	August 10
21	DeVilbiss 400	Michigan Speedway, Brooklyn	August 17
22	Goody's Headache Powder 500	Bristol Motor Speedway, Bristol	August 23
23	Mountain Dew Southern 500	Darlington Raceway, Darlington	August 31
24	Exide NASCAR Select Batteries 400	Richmond International Raceway, Richmond	September 6
25	CMT 300	New Hampshire International Speedway, Loudon	September 14
26	MBNA 400	Dover Downs International Speedway, Dover	September 21
27	Hanes 500	Martinsville Speedway, Ridgeway	September 29
28	UAW-GM Quality 500	Charlotte Motor Speedway, Concord	October 5
29	DieHard 500	Talladega Superspeedway, Talladega	October 12
30	AC Delco 400	North Carolina Motor Speedway, Rockingham	October 27
31	Dura Lube 500 presented by Kmart	Phoenix International Raceway, Phoenix	November 2
32	NAPA 500	Atlanta Motor Speedway, Hampton	November 16
	NASCAR Thunder Special Suzuka	Suzuka Circuit, Suzuka	November 23

== Results ==
No.	Race	Pole position	Most laps led	Winning driver	Manufacturer
	Busch Clash	Terry Labonte	Terry Labonte	Jeff Gordon	Chevrolet
	Gatorade 125 #1	Mike Skinner	Dale Jarrett	Dale Jarrett	Ford
	Gatorade 125 #2	Steve Grissom	Dale Earnhardt	Dale Earnhardt	Chevrolet
1	Daytona 500	Mike Skinner	Mark Martin	Jeff Gordon	Chevrolet
2	Goodwrench Service 400	Mark Martin	Dale Jarrett	Jeff Gordon	Chevrolet
3	Pontiac Excitement 400	Terry Labonte	Dale Jarrett	Rusty Wallace	Ford
4	Primestar 500	Robby Gordon	Dale Jarrett	Dale Jarrett	Ford
5	TranSouth Financial 400	Dale Jarrett	Dale Jarrett	Dale Jarrett	Ford
6	Interstate Batteries 500	Dale Jarrett	Terry Labonte	Jeff Burton	Ford
7	Food City 500	Rusty Wallace	Rusty Wallace	Jeff Gordon	Chevrolet
8	Goody's Headache Powder 500	Kenny Wallace	Jeff Gordon	Jeff Gordon	Chevrolet
9	Save Mart Supermarkets 300	Mark Martin	Mark Martin	Mark Martin	Ford
10	Winston 500	John Andretti	Dale Earnhardt	Mark Martin	Ford
	Winston Open	Chad Little	Ricky Craven	Ricky Craven	Chevrolet
	The Winston	Bill Elliott	Bobby Labonte	Jeff Gordon	Chevrolet
11	Coca-Cola 600	Jeff Gordon	Ernie Irvan	Jeff Gordon	Chevrolet
12	Miller 500	Bobby Labonte	Dale Jarrett	Ricky Rudd	Ford
13	Pocono 500	Bobby Hamilton	Ward Burton	Jeff Gordon	Chevrolet
14	Miller 400	Dale Jarrett	Ted Musgrave	Ernie Irvan	Ford
15	California 500 pres. by NAPA	Joe Nemechek	Jeff Gordon	Jeff Gordon	Chevrolet
16	Pepsi 400	Mike Skinner	John Andretti	John Andretti	Ford
17	Jiffy Lube 300	Ken Schrader	Jeff Burton	Jeff Burton	Ford
18	Pennsylvania 500	Joe Nemechek	Dale Jarrett	Dale Jarrett	Ford
19	Brickyard 400	Ernie Irvan	Ernie Irvan	Ricky Rudd	Ford
20	The Bud at The Glen	Todd Bodine	Jeff Gordon	Jeff Gordon	Chevrolet
21	DeVilbiss 400	Johnny Benson Jr.	Mark Martin	Mark Martin	Ford
22	Goody's Headache Powder 500	Kenny Wallace	Dale Jarrett	Dale Jarrett	Ford
23	Mountain Dew Southern 500	Bobby Labonte	Bill Elliott	Jeff Gordon	Chevrolet
24	Exide NASCAR Select Batteries 400	Bill Elliott	Jeff Burton	Dale Jarrett	Ford
25	CMT 300	Ken Schrader	Jeff Gordon	Jeff Gordon	Chevrolet
26	MBNA 400	Mark Martin	Mark Martin	Mark Martin	Ford
27	Hanes 500	Ward Burton	Rusty Wallace	Jeff Burton	Ford
28	UAW-GM Quality 500	Geoff Bodine	Bobby Labonte	Dale Jarrett	Ford
29	DieHard 500	Ernie Irvan	Terry Labonte	Terry Labonte	Chevrolet
30	AC Delco 400	Bobby Labonte	Ricky Craven	Bobby Hamilton	Pontiac
31	Dura Lube 500 pres. by Kmart	Bobby Hamilton	Rusty Wallace	Dale Jarrett	Ford
32	NAPA 500	Geoff Bodine	Bobby Labonte	Bobby Labonte	Pontiac

== Race Summaries ==
=== Busch Clash ===
The Busch Clash, a race for pole winners from the previous season, and drivers who have won the event before was run on February 9 in Daytona Beach, Florida. Terry Labonte drew the pole. The race was broadcast on CBS.

Top ten results

1. #24 - Jeff Gordon
2. #2 - Rusty Wallace
3. #3 - Dale Earnhardt
4. #22 - Ward Burton
5. #28 - Ernie Irvan
6. #6 - Mark Martin
7. #88 - Dale Jarrett
8. #25 - Ricky Craven
9. #30 - Johnny Benson
10. #37 - Jeremy Mayfield

=== Gatorade 125s ===
The Gatorade Twin 125s were run on February 13 in Daytona Beach, Florida. Mike Skinner and Steve Grissom were the pole sitters for races one and two, respectively. The races were broadcast tape-delayed on CBS just prior to the Daytona 500.

Race one results

1. #88 - Dale Jarrett
2. #31 - Mike Skinner
3. #28 - Ernie Irvan
4. #23 - Jimmy Spencer
5. #4 - Sterling Marlin
6. #6 - Mark Martin
7. #10 - Ricky Rudd
8. #18 - Bobby Labonte
9. #22 - Ward Burton
10. #29 - Robert Pressley

Race two results

1. #3 - Dale Earnhardt
2. #24 - Jeff Gordon
3. #94 - Bill Elliott
4. #33 - Ken Schrader
5. #21 - Michael Waltrip
6. #2 - Rusty Wallace
7. #30 - Johnny Benson
8. #5 - Terry Labonte
9. #40 - Robby Gordon
10. #17 - Darrell Waltrip

=== 39th Daytona 500 ===
The 1997 Daytona 500 was run on February 16 at Daytona International Speedway. Mike Skinner won the pole. The race ended under caution after a big crash with five laps remaining involved several cars. The race was broadcast on CBS.

1. #24 - Jeff Gordon*
2. #5 - Terry Labonte
3. #25 - Ricky Craven
4. #94 - Bill Elliott
5. #4 - Sterling Marlin
6. #37 - Jeremy Mayfield
7. #6 - Mark Martin
8. #22 - Ward Burton
9. #10 - Ricky Rudd
10. #17 - Darrell Waltrip

Failed to qualify: #91 - Mike Wallace, #95 - Gary Bradberry, #78 - Billy Standridge, #15 - Larry Pearson, #42 - Joe Nemechek*, #97 - Chad Little, #75 - Rick Mast, #96 - David Green, #0 - Delma Cowart, #84 - Norm Benning.

- Robert Pressley's car caught air after he spun on lap 10. The rear of the car lifted so much, the car was temporarily sliding across the track on its nose. After the crew repaired the car, Todd Bodine drove the car to complete more laps.
- Joe Nemechek's car owner Felix Sabates bought the #73 entry of Phil Barkdoll, who had qualified 38th. Nemechek drove Barkdoll's #73 for the 500.
- Dale Earnhardt rolled his #3 Chevrolet in a crash with Ernie Irvan while in a four-way battle for the lead with 12 laps to go. In the crash, the hood of Irvan's car flew into the backstretch grandstand, injuring some fans. Earnhardt famously noticed that his tires were still on the car after the roll, had his car taken off the hook, and drove it back to pit road. The car was repaired and Earnhardt finished the race in 31st, 5 laps down.
- At 25 years old, Jeff Gordon became the youngest Daytona 500 winner ever until Trevor Bayne in 2011.
- Hendrick Motorsports posted a 1-2-3 finish with Gordon winning the race, Terry Labonte finishing second, and Ricky Craven finishing in third.

=== Goodwrench Service 400 ===
The Goodwrench Service 400 was run on February 23 at North Carolina Speedway. Mark Martin won the pole. The race was broadcast on TNN.

Top ten results

1. #24 - Jeff Gordon
2. #88 - Dale Jarrett
3. #99 - Jeff Burton
4. #10 - Ricky Rudd
5. #25 - Ricky Craven
6. #2 - Rusty Wallace
7. #5 - Terry Labonte
8. #7 - Geoff Bodine
9. #28 - Ernie Irvan
10. #1 - Morgan Shepherd

Failed to qualify: #97 - Chad Little, #78 - Billy Standridge, #91 - Mike Wallace, #95 - Gary Bradberry

=== Pontiac Excitement 400 ===
The Pontiac Excitement 400 was held March 2 at Richmond International Raceway. Terry Labonte won the pole. The race was broadcast on ESPN.

Top ten results

1. #2 - Rusty Wallace*
2. #7 - Geoff Bodine
3. #88 - Dale Jarrett
4. #24 - Jeff Gordon (-1)
5. #43 - Bobby Hamilton (-1)
6. #10 - Ricky Rudd (-1)
7. #5 - Terry Labonte (-1)
8. #18 - Bobby Labonte (-1)
9. #30 - Johnny Benson (-1)
10. #44 - Kyle Petty (-2)

Failed to qualify: #78 - Billy Standridge, #20 - Greg Sacks, #91 - Mike Wallace

- During the post-race inspection, Rusty Wallace's engine failed to meet the proper 14:1 compression ratio. Due to this, NASCAR suspended Wallace's victory and confiscated his car's motor. After conducting another test the following day, the cooler temperature engine met the required compression ratio. As a result, Wallace's victory was certified official.
- Only 3 cars finished on the lead lap in this race.
- This was the last Winston Cup race at Richmond International Raceway scheduled for the daytime (excluding rain-delayed races) until 2016, and the last Richmond race to be held in March.

=== Primestar 500 ===
The Primestar 500 was run on March 9 at Atlanta Motor Speedway in Hampton, Georgia. Robby Gordon won the pole. The race was broadcast on ABC.

Top ten results

1. #88 - Dale Jarrett
2. #28 - Ernie Irvan
3. #1 - Morgan Shepherd
4. #18 - Bobby Labonte
5. #99 - Jeff Burton
6. #6 - Mark Martin
7. #21 - Michael Waltrip
8. #3 - Dale Earnhardt
9. #5 - Terry Labonte
10. #43 - Bobby Hamilton

Failed to qualify: #29 - Robert Pressley, #36 - Derrike Cope, #46 - Wally Dallenbach Jr., #71 - Dave Marcis, #77 - Bobby Hillin Jr., #95 - Ed Berrier, #08 - Mike Miller

- This was the final race held on the 1.522-mile (2.449 km) configuration of Atlanta Motor Speedway. Renovations had already started that would turn the racetrack into a 1.54-mile (2.48 km) quad-oval.
- This race was red-flagged on lap 282 due to a crash involving Steve Grissom, in which Grissom spun to avoid another wreck and hit the inside wall with enough force to obliterate the back end of his car, and break the wall. The force of the impact sheared the fuel cell out of the car, sending it flying across the track, and spilling fuel. The spilled fuel later ignited, causing a significant fire. Grissom was not seriously injured.

=== TranSouth Financial 400 ===
The TranSouth Financial 400 was held March 23 at Darlington Raceway. Dale Jarrett won the pole. The race was broadcast on ESPN.

Top ten results

1. #88 - Dale Jarrett
2. #16 - Ted Musgrave
3. #24 - Jeff Gordon
4. #99 - Jeff Burton
5. #18 - Bobby Labonte
6. #2 - Rusty Wallace
7. #21 - Michael Waltrip
8. #33 - Ken Schrader
9. #7 - Geoff Bodine
10. #30 - Johnny Benson

Failed to qualify: #41 - Steve Grissom, #78 - Billy Standridge, #90 - Dick Trickle

- Phil Parsons substituted for Joe Nemechek, who was with family after his younger brother John's death. This was Parsons' final career Cup Series start.
- This would be the last Darlington race to be won from the pole until April 2014.

=== Interstate Batteries 500 ===
The inaugural Interstate Batteries 500 was held April 6 at Texas Motor Speedway. Dale Jarrett won the pole. This was the first race held at the track and the first NASCAR race in the state of Texas since 1981. The race was broadcast on CBS.

Top ten results

1. #99 - Jeff Burton*
2. #88 - Dale Jarrett
3. #18 - Bobby Labonte
4. #5 - Terry Labonte
5. #10 - Ricky Rudd
6. #3 - Dale Earnhardt
7. #22 - Ward Burton
8. #4 - Sterling Marlin
9. #21 - Michael Waltrip
10. #41 - Steve Grissom

Failed to qualify: #19 - Gary Bradberry, #27 - Rick Wilson, #29 - Robert Pressley, 46 - Wally Dallenbach Jr., 66 - H. B. Bailey, 74 - Randy LaJoie, 95 - Ed Berrier, 96 - David Green, 02 - Mike Bliss

- This was Jeff Burton's first career Winston Cup victory.
- On the first lap of the race, 15 cars were involved in a multi-car accident in turns 1 and 2. Dale Earnhardt was involved in the incident, but was able to continue.
- On lap 162, an 8-car crash on the tri-oval began when Mike Skinner, Brett Bodine and Sterling Marlin spun into the infield coming off turn 4, and Rusty Wallace struck the outside wall after getting into some oil. Later, Ernie Irvan rear-ended Greg Sacks at over 140 mph while trying to race leader Terry Labonte back to the flag to get his lap back and hit the outside wall. Jeff Gordon ran into the back of Irvan trying to avoid Sacks.
- Ricky Craven suffered a concussion in a practice crash and was forced to sit out. This was the beginning of a series of injuries that adversely affected Craven's career over the next 4 years. Todd Bodine subbed for Craven in this race and ran well until he crashed out of the lead.

=== Food City 500 ===
The Food City 500 was held on April 13 at Bristol Motor Speedway. Rusty Wallace won the pole. The race was broadcast on ESPN.

Top ten results

1. #24 - Jeff Gordon*
2. #2 - Rusty Wallace
3. #5 - Terry Labonte
4. #88 - Dale Jarrett
5. #6 - Mark Martin
6. #3 - Dale Earnhardt
7. #94 - Bill Elliott
8. #97 - Chad Little
9. #37 - Jeremy Mayfield
10. #11 - Brett Bodine

Failed to qualify: #20 - Greg Sacks, #77 - Bobby Hillin Jr., #78 - Billy Standridge, #91 - Mike Wallace

- This race had 20 cautions for 132 laps, which tied the record for most cautions with the 1989 spring event at Bristol.
- On the last lap, Jeff Gordon bumped Rusty Wallace out of the way in Turn 4 to win the race. Wallace barely was able to hold off Terry Labonte for 2nd.
- Jack Sprague subbed for Ricky Craven in this race due to Craven's injury at Texas last weekend.

=== Goody's Headache Powder 500 ===
The Goody's Headache Powder 500 was held April 20 at Martinsville Speedway. Kenny Wallace won the pole. It was FILMAR Racing's first career pole of the season. The race was broadcast on ESPN.

Top ten results

1. #24 - Jeff Gordon*
2. #43 - Bobby Hamilton
3. #6 - Mark Martin
4. #5 - Terry Labonte
5. #2 - Rusty Wallace
6. #81 - Kenny Wallace
7. #37 - Jeremy Mayfield
8. #18 - Bobby Labonte
9. #17 - Darrell Waltrip
10. #33 - Ken Schrader

Failed to qualify: #19 - Gary Bradberry, #20 - Lance Hooper, #78 - Billy Standridge, #79 - Randy MacDonald, #96 - David Green

- Winner Jeff Gordon was spun out at one point of the race by Jimmy Spencer but was able to recover from the spin to win the race.
- Ricky Craven returned to the #25 Chevrolet after missing 2 races. He finished 22nd, 2 laps down.
- Jeff Gordon led 431 of the 500 laps in this race, the most laps he has led in a single race in his career.

=== Save Mart Supermarkets 300 ===
The Save Mart Supermarkets 300 was held May 4 at Sears Point Raceway. Mark Martin won the pole. The race was broadcast on ESPN.

Top ten results

1. #6 - Mark Martin*
2. #24 - Jeff Gordon
3. #5 - Terry Labonte
4. #88 - Dale Jarrett
5. #17 - Darrell Waltrip
6. #11 - Brett Bodine
7. #21 - Michael Waltrip
8. #28 - Ernie Irvan
9. #99 - Jeff Burton
10. #22 - Ward Burton

Failed to qualify: #29 - Robert Pressley, #42 - Joe Nemechek, #45 - Gary Smith, #75 - Rick Mast, #78w - Chuck Pruitt, #90 - Dick Trickle, #96 - David Green, #97 - Chad Little, #09 - R. K. Smith

- This was Martin's first Cup Series victory since October 1995, breaking a 42-race winless streak.
- Melling Racing technically did not make the trip to Sears Point due to a lack of funding. However, they allowed Jeff Davis' Winston West Series team to use the #9 on their Ford so that the Melling team could get the owners' points. Davis ended up crashing out of the race, finishing 37th.
- This was the last race for the Winston Cup Series on the 2.52-mile (4.06 km) configuration at Sears Point Raceway until 2019. After this event, a purpose-built section was added for the NASCAR weekend.
- After David Green failed to qualify, Caterpillar put their logos on the #35 Ford was driven by Larry Gunselman, one of the Winston West teams. Gunselman started the race, but Green did get in the car and drive at one point.
- The #19 Ford for Tri-Star Motorsports that was driven by Gary Bradberry in the race was actually qualified by Ken Pedersen, a driver in Winston West at the time.
- The #78 Ford for Triad Motorsports tapped Tom Hubert, a crew member for Bahari Racing, to qualify the #78 in 2nd round qualifying. When Hubert (who had some road racing experience in other classes) qualified fast enough to earn the 27th starting spot in the race, Hubert was put in the car for the race to temporarily replace the team's regular driver, Billy Standridge.
- This was the final Sears Point race to be held in May, as race would be moved to the last Sunday in June, where it would remain through 2019.
- Geoff Bodine Racing's sponsor; QVC, ran a promotion in which a lucky fan would get their name and face on Geoff Bodine's #7 QVC Ford, with the winner being Mississippi native Dawn Gillis. Bodine would finish in last place.

=== Winston 500 ===
The Winston 500 at Talladega Superspeedway was originally scheduled for Sunday, April 27, but rain forced the race to be postponed. Teams returned on Saturday, May 10 (Mother's Day weekend).

John Andretti started from the pole position. The race was broadcast on ESPN.

Top ten results

1. #6 - Mark Martin*
2. #3 - Dale Earnhardt
3. #18 - Bobby Labonte
4. #98 - John Andretti
5. #24 - Jeff Gordon
6. #5 - Terry Labonte
7. #23 - Jimmy Spencer
8. #99 - Jeff Burton
9. #30 - Johnny Benson
10. #28 - Ernie Irvan

Failed to qualify: #19 - Gary Bradberry, #42 - Joe Nemechek*, #73 - Phil Barkdoll, #78 - Billy Standridge, #91 - Mike Wallace, #95 - Ed Berrier

- The race was run caution-free, the first time in Talladega history. It also stands as the fastest 500-mile (800 km) race in NASCAR history, with an average speed of 188.354 mph (303.126 km/h).
- Joe Nemechek drove the #40 Chevrolet in place of Robby Gordon during this race since Gordon was in Indianapolis for Indianapolis 500 Pole Day, attempting to do the Indy-Charlotte double in 1997. Nemechek finished 19th, 1 lap down in Gordon's car.
- This was the last race for the #20 Ford for Ranier-Walsh Racing. The acquisition of their sponsor Hardee's by CKE Restaurants resulted in the company pulling sponsorship of the team. Without sponsorship, the team shut its doors.
- Final time in his career that Mark Martin would win back-to-back races.

=== Winston Open ===
The Winston Open was held before The Winston All-Star Race on May 17 at Charlotte Motor Speedway as a last chance qualifier race for the cars that had not won a race yet in 1997 or late 1996 and was not a past champion. Chad Little won the pole. The winner of this race would qualify to be in The Winston All-Star Race.

Top ten results

1. #25 - Ricky Craven
2. #41 - Steve Grissom
3. #9 - Lake Speed
4. #97 - Chad Little
5. #8 - Hut Stricklin
6. #46 - Wally Dallenbach Jr.
7. #30 - Johnny Benson
8. #33 - Ken Schrader
9. #98 - John Andretti
10. #31 - Mike Skinner

=== The Winston ===
The Winston is the All-Star Race for the NASCAR Winston Cup Series held at the Charlotte Motor Speedway on May 17 after the Winston Open Race. Drivers have to qualify; Win a race since last year The Winston race, Win the Winston Open qualifier race, or Win one of The Winston All-Star Races from the past 5 years. This race was run in 3 segments with 2 30 lap segments and a 10 lap shootout segment for a total of 70 laps. Bill Elliott won the pole. Dale Jarrett won the first segment and Bobby Labonte won the second segment. The race was broadcast on TNN.

Top ten final segment results

1. #24 - Jeff Gordon
2. #18 - Bobby Labonte
3. #5 - Terry Labonte
4. #3 - Dale Earnhardt
5. #23 - Jimmy Spencer
6. #6 - Mark Martin
7. #88 - Dale Jarrett
8. #25 - Ricky Craven
9. #10 - Ricky Rudd
10. #94 - Bill Elliott
- The only caution came on the 3rd lap of the first segment when Bobby Labonte spun coming off turn 4.
- Gordon started 19th because of a problem during his qualifying run.
- After the first segment was completed, the finishing order would be inverted for the start of the 2nd segment. The finishing order of the 2nd segment determined how the field would line up for the final segment. Caution laps counted in the first two 30-lap stages; however, only green flag laps were recorded in the final 10-lap stage.
- Speedvision carried a special live in-car simulcast of this race.
- During the prerace activities for The Winston, Indy Racing League driver Tony Stewart, who had qualified 2nd for the Indianapolis 500, drove several laps around the track in his IndyCar to promote the IRL race to be held at Charlotte two months later.

=== Coca-Cola 600 ===
The Coca-Cola 600 was held May 25 at Charlotte Motor Speedway. Jeff Gordon won the pole. The race was shortened to 333 laps due to time issues after a long rain delay; it was after 1:00 am EDT when the race was completed. The race was broadcast on TBS.

Top ten results

1. #24 - Jeff Gordon
2. #2 - Rusty Wallace
3. #6 - Mark Martin
4. #94 - Bill Elliott
5. #99 - Jeff Burton
6. #18 - Bobby Labonte
7. #3 - Dale Earnhardt
8. #5 - Terry Labonte
9. #1 - Morgan Shepherd
10. #10 - Ricky Rudd

Failed to qualify: #71 - Dave Marcis, #77 - Bobby Hillin Jr., #91 - Mike Wallace, #95 - Ed Berrier, #97 - Chad Little

- Geoff Bodine suffered a concussion in a practice crash on the Wednesday. As a result, Geoff tapped his younger brother Todd to drive his #7 Ford in the race. However, the engine blew after Todd had made a run up through the field, leaving him with a 42nd-place finish.
- This was the final race for flagman Doyle Ford, who had spent 38 years as a NASCAR official.

=== Miller 500 ===
The Miller 500 was held June 1 at Dover Downs International Speedway. Bobby Labonte won the pole. The race was broadcast on TNN.

Top ten results

1. #10 - Ricky Rudd
2. #6 - Mark Martin
3. #99 - Jeff Burton
4. #37 - Jeremy Mayfield
5. #44 - Kyle Petty
6. #33 - Ken Schrader
7. #21 - Michael Waltrip
8. #94 - Bill Elliott
9. #31 - Mike Skinner
10. #4 - Sterling Marlin

Failed to qualify: #78 - Billy Standridge, #95 - Ed Berrier

- This was the last 500-mile (800 km) race held at Dover.
- Wally Dallenbach Jr. drove Robby Gordon's #40 Chevy for this race, as Gordon suffered severe burns to he legs in a bizarre incident in the Indianapolis 500, forcing him to sit out for a couple of weeks. Dallenbach finishing 36th.
- Three different leaders had problems in the last 50 miles of the race. Second-place Jeff Gordon hit the back of leader Dale Jarrett while trying to avoid a spinning Kenny Wallace on lap 452, causing radiator damage that forced Gordon behind the wall for repairs, eventually finishing 26th. Jarrett retook the lead after the caution, but blew an engine 5 laps after the restart, finishing 32nd. Jarrett's teammate Ernie Irvan inherited the lead and led the following 9 laps, but crashed on lap 472 after hitting rear end grease from Chad Little's car. Irvan finished 30th. That gave the lead to Rudd, who held it the final 27 laps to win.

=== Pocono 500 ===
The Pocono 500 was held June 8 at Pocono Raceway. Bobby Hamilton won the pole. The race was broadcast on TNN.

Top ten results

1. #24 - Jeff Gordon
2. #99 - Jeff Burton
3. #88 - Dale Jarrett
4. #6 - Mark Martin
5. #37 - Jeremy Mayfield
6. #16 - Ted Musgrave
7. #17 - Darrell Waltrip
8. #7 - Geoff Bodine
9. #5 - Terry Labonte
10. #3 - Dale Earnhardt

Failed to qualify: #97 - Chad Little, #78 - Billy Standridge, #71 - Dave Marcis

- Greg Sacks was tapped to sub for Robby Gordon in the #40 starting here at Pocono. He qualified 4th but spun into the wall coming out of Turn 1 on Lap 9 immediately in front of Jeff Gordon.

=== Miller 400 ===
The Miller 400 was held June 15 at Michigan Speedway. Dale Jarrett won the pole. The race was broadcast on CBS.

Top ten results

1. #28 - Ernie Irvan*
2. #94 - Bill Elliott
3. #6 - Mark Martin
4. #16 - Ted Musgrave
5. #24 - Jeff Gordon
6. #88 - Dale Jarrett
7. #3 - Dale Earnhardt
8. #36 - Derrike Cope
9. #18 - Bobby Labonte
10. #30 - Johnny Benson

Failed to qualify: #1 - Morgan Shepherd, #19 - Gary Bradberry, #20 - Greg Sacks, #91 - Mike Wallace, #95 - Ed Berrier

- This was Ernie Irvan's 15th and final Winston Cup victory, coming at the same track where he had almost lost his life three years earlier. He had tears in his eyes as he drove into Victory Lane. This victory also came in his last year with Robert Yates Racing.
- This was the 1st career Winston Cup start for Jerry Nadeau in the #1 Pontiac for Precision Products Racing. He replaced Morgan Shepherd in the car.
- This would be the final CBS race to have Ken Squier as lap-by-lap announcer. Starting with the DieHard 500 in October, all future CBS races would have Mike Joy as the lap-by-lap announcer while Squier was transferred to serving as the studio host.

=== California 500 presented by NAPA ===
The inaugural California 500 presented by NAPA was held on June 22 at California Speedway. Joe Nemechek won the pole. The race was broadcast on ABC.

Top ten results

1. #24 - Jeff Gordon
2. #5 - Terry Labonte
3. #10 - Ricky Rudd
4. #16 - Ted Musgrave
5. #23 - Jimmy Spencer
6. #18 - Bobby Labonte
7. #29 - Jeff Green
8. #88 - Dale Jarrett
9. #25 - Ricky Craven
10. #6 - Mark Martin

Failed to qualify: #78 - Billy Standridge, #81 - Kenny Wallace, #91 - Mike Wallace*

- After Mike Wallace failed to qualify for the race, his team hastily entered the 200-mile (320 km) Winston West race which was run the day before the Winston Cup race. He finished 3rd to Ken Schrader in that race.
- Mark Martin ran out of gas with 10 laps to go and was forced to the pits for additional fuel. However, they did not get enough fuel in the car. This resulted in Martin running out of gas again on the last lap and having to coast to the line.
- This was the only Cup race at California Speedway to be held in June. The following year, the race moved to the first week of May, swapping dates with Sears Point Raceway.

=== Pepsi 400 ===
The Pepsi 400 was held on July 5 at Daytona International Speedway. Mike Skinner won the pole. The race was broadcast on ESPN for the last time.

Top ten results

1. #98 - John Andretti*
2. #5 - Terry Labonte
3. #4 - Sterling Marlin
4. #3 - Dale Earnhardt
5. #88 - Dale Jarrett
6. #2 - Rusty Wallace
7. #44 - Kyle Petty
8. #99 - Jeff Burton
9. #28 - Ernie Irvan
10. #18 - Bobby Labonte

Failed to qualify: #7 - Geoff Bodine, #29 - Jeff Green, #91 - Loy Allen Jr.

- This was John Andretti's first career Cup Series victory, and the only Cup Series victory for Cale Yarborough as a car owner.
- This was the last non-delayed Daytona summer race scheduled to run during the day.
- The race ended with a 1 lap shootout, likely the last such shootout in the Winston Cup Series.

=== Jiffy Lube 300 ===
The Jiffy Lube 300 was held July 13 at New Hampshire International Speedway. Ken Schrader won the pole. The race was broadcast on TNN.

Top ten results

1. #99 - Jeff Burton
2. #3 - Dale Earnhardt
3. #2 - Rusty Wallace
4. #41 - Steve Grissom
5. #6 - Mark Martin
6. #94 - Bill Elliott
7. #5 - Terry Labonte
8. #28 - Ernie Irvan
9. #10 - Ricky Rudd
10. #7 - Geoff Bodine

Failed to qualify: #78 - Billy Standridge

- Jeff Gordon finished 2 laps down in 23rd, losing the points lead to Terry Labonte, who finished 7th.

=== Pennsylvania 500 ===
The Pennsylvania 500 was held July 20 at Pocono Raceway. Joe Nemechek won the pole. The race was broadcast on TBS.

Top ten results

1. #88 - Dale Jarrett
2. #24 - Jeff Gordon*
3. #99 - Jeff Burton
4. #16 - Ted Musgrave
5. #6 - Mark Martin
6. #31 - Mike Skinner
7. #23 - Jimmy Spencer
8. #44 - Kyle Petty
9. #37 - Jeremy Mayfield
10. #94 - Bill Elliott

Failed to Qualify: #78 - Bobby Hillin Jr., #14 - Steve Park, #20 - Greg Sacks

- Gordon's 2nd-place finish allowed him to retake the points lead from Terry Labonte, who finished 35th.

=== Brickyard 400 ===
The Brickyard 400 was held August 3 at Indianapolis Motor Speedway. Ernie Irvan won the pole. The race was broadcast on ABC.

Top ten results

1. #10 - Ricky Rudd*
2. #18 - Bobby Labonte
3. #88 - Dale Jarrett
4. #24 - Jeff Gordon
5. #37 - Jeremy Mayfield
6. #6 - Mark Martin
7. #30 - Johnny Benson
8. #94 - Bill Elliott
9. #31 - Mike Skinner
10. #28 - Ernie Irvan

Failed to qualify: #1 - Mike Wallace, #7 - Geoff Bodine, #8 - Hut Stricklin, #61 - Tim Steele, #71 - Dave Marcis, #77 - Morgan Shepherd, #78 - Bobby Hillin Jr., #90 - Dick Trickle

- First time since 1987 that Ricky Rudd won multiple races in a season.

=== The Bud at The Glen ===
The Bud at The Glen was held August 10 at Watkins Glen International. Todd Bodine won the pole. The race was broadcast on ESPN.

Top ten results

1. #24 - Jeff Gordon*
2. #7 - Geoff Bodine
3. #2 - Rusty Wallace
4. #40 - Robby Gordon
5. #6 - Mark Martin
6. #16 - Ted Musgrave
7. #94 - Bill Elliott
8. #5 - Terry Labonte
9. #41 - Steve Grissom
10. #46 - Wally Dallenbach Jr.

Failed to qualify: #78 - Bobby Hillin Jr., #77 - Morgan Shepherd, #71 - Dave Marcis

- This was Jeff Gordon's 1st career victory on a road course, beginning a streak of 6 consecutive road course wins that lasted until 2000.
- Steve Park made his Cup Series debut in this race, driving the #14 Chevrolet for Dale Earnhardt Inc.. Park qualified 12th and finished 2 laps down in 33rd.

=== DeVilbiss 400 ===
The DeVilbiss 400 was held August 17 at Michigan Speedway. Johnny Benson won the pole. The race was broadcast on ESPN.

Top ten results

1. #6 - Mark Martin
2. #24 - Jeff Gordon
3. #16 - Ted Musgrave
4. #28 - Ernie Irvan
5. #88 - Dale Jarrett
6. #18 - Bobby Labonte
7. #94 - Bill Elliott
8. #99 - Jeff Burton
9. #3 - Dale Earnhardt
10. #5 - Terry Labonte

Failed to qualify: #71 - Dave Marcis

- Mark Martin won after suffering blown left rear tire that put him 2 laps down.
- Roush Racing drivers dominated the day leading 177 of 200 laps.

=== Goody's Headache Powder 500 ===
The Goody's Headache Powder 500 was held August 23 at Bristol Motor Speedway. Kenny Wallace won the pole. The race was broadcast on ESPN.

Top ten results

1. #88 - Dale Jarrett
2. #6 - Mark Martin
3. #90 - Dick Trickle
4. #99 - Jeff Burton
5. #41 - Steve Grissom
6. #33 - Ken Schrader
7. #5 - Terry Labonte
8. #18 - Bobby Labonte
9. #7 - Geoff Bodine*
10. #4 - Sterling Marlin

Failed to qualify: #40 - Robby Gordon, #71 - Dave Marcis, #77 - Morgan Shepherd

- Jeff Gordon crashed out of the lead in an incident with Jeremy Mayfield on lap 246. Gordon would not recover, eventually retiring from the race and finishing 35th.
- Shortly after the halfway point, Geoff Bodine's crew chief Pat Tryson quit the team, apparently unhappy with the way the team was being managed.

=== Mountain Dew Southern 500 ===
The Mountain Dew Southern 500 was held August 31 at Darlington Raceway. Bobby Labonte won the pole. The race was broadcast on ESPN.

Top ten results

1. 24 - Jeff Gordon*
2. 99 - Jeff Burton
3. 88 - Dale Jarrett
4. 94 - Bill Elliott
5. 10 - Ricky Rudd
6. 5 - Terry Labonte
7. 18 - Bobby Labonte
8. 6 - Mark Martin
9. 21 - Michael Waltrip
10. 33 - Ken Schrader

Failed to qualify: #71 - Dave Marcis, #77 - Morgan Shepherd, #91 - Greg Sacks

- Jeff Gordon's victory made him the 2nd and final driver, joining Bill Elliott, to win the Winston Million. Ironically, the 2 drivers that won the Winston Million won it in the very first running in 1985, and in the very last running in 1997. The program was replaced the following season in 1998 with the No Bull 5 program, which offered five drivers (that finished in the Top 5 of the last No Bull 5 race) the chance to win 1 million dollars.
- After crashing out at Bristol, Gordon retook the points lead after winning this race, and would hold it for the rest of the season.
- Dale Earnhardt mysteriously blacked out during the pace laps for the race and hit the wall, resulting in Earnhardt stepping out of the car for the day. After repairs, Busch Series driver Mike Dillon was tapped to sub in the #3. Dillon drove the car to a 30th-place finish, 85 laps down. The cause of Earnhardt's blackouts was never determined.

=== Exide NASCAR Select Batteries 400 ===
The Exide NASCAR Select Batteries 400 was held September 6 at Richmond International Raceway. Bill Elliott won the pole. The race was broadcast on ESPN.

Top ten results

1. #88 - Dale Jarrett
2. #99 - Jeff Burton
3. #24 - Jeff Gordon
4. #7 - Geoff Bodine
5. #2 - Rusty Wallace
6. #42 - Joe Nemechek
7. #22 - Ward Burton
8. #27 - Kenny Irwin Jr.*
9. #16 - Ted Musgrave
10. #37 - Jeremy Mayfield

Failed to qualify: #71 - Dave Marcis, #02 - Mike Bliss, #91 - Ron Hornaday Jr., #78 - Gary Bradberry, #77 - Morgan Shepherd

- This was Kenny Irwin Jr.'s first career Winston Cup start, qualifying 2nd and finishing 8th.

=== CMT 300 ===
The CMT 300 was held September 14 at New Hampshire International Speedway. Ken Schrader won the pole. The race was broadcast on TNN.

Top ten results

1. #24 - Jeff Gordon*
2. #28 - Ernie Irvan
3. #43 - Bobby Hamilton
4. #41 - Steve Grissom
5. #25 - Ricky Craven
6. #88 - Dale Jarrett
7. #23 - Jimmy Spencer
8. #3 - Dale Earnhardt
9. #6 - Mark Martin
10. #8 - Hut Stricklin

Failed to qualify: #1 - Lance Hooper, #14 - Steve Park, #91 - Kevin Lepage

- This was the first September race held at New Hampshire International Speedway. The race date was acquired as part of the purchase of North Wilkesboro Speedway in 1996 that resulted in its dates being split.
- Jeff Burton had an inner ear problem and required relief from Todd Bodine.
- 10th and final win of 1997 for Jeff Gordon.
- Jeff Gordon became the 1st driver since Darrell Waltrip in 1981 & 1982 to score at least 10 victories in back-to-back seasons.

=== MBNA 400 ===
The MBNA 400 was held September 21 at Dover Downs International Speedway. Mark Martin won the pole. The race was broadcast on TNN.

Top ten results

1. #6 - Mark Martin*
2. #3 - Dale Earnhardt
3. #44 - Kyle Petty*
4. #18 - Bobby Labonte
5. #88 - Dale Jarrett
6. #10 - Ricky Rudd
7. #24 - Jeff Gordon
8. #94 - Bill Elliott
9. #28 - Ernie Irvan
10. #75 - Rick Mast

Failed to qualify: #14 - Steve Park

- This was the first 400-mile (640 km) race at Dover.
- Mark Martin and Kyle Petty dominated this race, with Martin leading 194 laps and Petty leading 191. This would also be Petty's last top 5 finish until the 2007 Coca-Cola 600.

=== Hanes 500 ===
The Hanes 500 was held September 29 at Martinsville Speedway. Ward Burton won the pole. The race was broadcast on ESPN.

Top ten results

1. #99 - Jeff Burton*
2. #3 - Dale Earnhardt
3. #43 - Bobby Hamilton
4. #24 - Jeff Gordon
5. #94 - Bill Elliott
6. #81 - Kenny Wallace
7. #22 - Ward Burton
8. #25 - Ricky Craven
9. #33 - Ken Schrader
10. #28 - Ernie Irvan

Failed to qualify: #78 - Gary Bradberry, #1 - Morgan Shepherd, #71 - Dave Marcis

- Jeff Burton inherited the lead after leader Rusty Wallace jumped a restart and was black-flagged as a result.
- Steve Park drove the #40 Chevrolet in place of Robby Gordon, who was subbing for Dario Franchitti in the CART race at California Speedway. Park blew an engine early and finished 41st.

=== UAW-GM Quality 500 ===
The UAW-GM Quality 500 was held October 5 at Charlotte Motor Speedway. Geoff Bodine won the pole. The race was broadcast on TBS.

Top ten results

1. #88 - Dale Jarrett
2. #18 - Bobby Labonte
3. #3 - Dale Earnhardt
4. #6 - Mark Martin
5. #24 - Jeff Gordon
6. #99 - Jeff Burton
7. #94 - Bill Elliott
8. #22 - Ward Burton
9. #44 - Kyle Petty
10. #30 - Johnny Benson

Failed to qualify: #14 - Steve Park, #15 - Greg Sacks, #17 - Darrell Waltrip*, #31 - Mike Skinner, #40 - Elliott Sadler, #71 - Dave Marcis, #75 - Rick Mast

- Darrell Waltrip failed to qualify because Terry Labonte, who was higher in points, used the past champion's provisional. This was Waltrip's first DNQ since 1974.
- This was Rick Wilson's final Cup start. He would finish 3 laps down in 19th.
- This was the first career start for Kevin Lepage in the #91 Chevrolet. He would crash out and finish 40th.
- Early in the race, there was an unusual water seepage problem on the backstretch. This resulted in the track near the outside wall in the middle of the backstretch being wet to the point where cars were kicking up spray. This did not cause any problems, however.
- This was the first race for ISM Racing's #35 Pontiac with Todd Bodine as the driver. Bodine finished 4 laps down in 26th.

=== DieHard 500 ===
The DieHard 500 was held October 12 at Talladega Superspeedway. Ernie Irvan won the pole. The race was broadcast on CBS.

Top ten results

1. #5 - Terry Labonte*
2. #18 - Bobby Labonte
3. #98 - John Andretti
4. #33 - Ken Schrader
5. #28 - Ernie Irvan
6. #25 - Ricky Craven
7. #44 - Kyle Petty
8. #7 - Geoff Bodine
9. #75 - Rick Mast
10. #2 - Rusty Wallace

Failed to qualify: #8 - Hut Stricklin, #22 - Ward Burton, #29 - Jeff Green, #78 - Gary Bradberry, #95 - Ed Berrier

- The top-5 finishers of this (T. Labonte, B. Labonte, Andretti, Schrader, Irvan) became the first drivers eligible for the Winston No Bull 5 million dollar bonus for next season, meaning that if any of them were to win the 1998 Daytona 500, they would receive an extra $1 million.
- By winning this race, Terry Labonte became only the second Chevrolet driver to win a race in 1997. Jeff Gordon had all of the other wins for Chevrolet in 1997.
- This was the last Talladega race to be broadcast by CBS.
- This would be the first CBS race for Mike Joy as the lap-by-lap broadcaster.

=== AC Delco 400 ===
The AC Delco 400 was originally scheduled to be run on Sunday, October 26 but heavy rain postponed the race to Monday, October 27 at North Carolina Speedway. Bobby Labonte won the pole. The race was broadcast on TNN.

Top ten results

1. #43 - Bobby Hamilton
2. #88 - Dale Jarrett
3. #25 - Ricky Craven
4. #24 - Jeff Gordon
5. #90 - Dick Trickle
6. #6 - Mark Martin
7. #5 - Terry Labonte
8. #3 - Dale Earnhardt
9. #4 - Sterling Marlin
10. #42 - Joe Nemechek

Failed to qualify: #11 - Brett Bodine, #71 - Dave Marcis

=== Dura Lube 500 presented by Kmart ===
The Dura Lube 500 presented by Kmart was held November 2 at Phoenix International Raceway. Bobby Hamilton won the pole. The race was broadcast on TNN.

Top ten results

1. #88 - Dale Jarrett*
2. #2 - Rusty Wallace
3. #43 - Bobby Hamilton
4. #33 - Ken Schrader
5. #3 - Dale Earnhardt
6. #6 - Mark Martin
7. #30 - Johnny Benson
8. #41 - Steve Grissom
9. #44 - Kyle Petty
10. #7 - Geoff Bodine

Failed to qualify: #1 - Morgan Shepherd

- This was the final Cup Series victory for the Ford Thunderbird, as Ford would switch to the Taurus in 1998.

=== NAPA 500 ===
The 1997 championship season finale was the NAPA 500 held November 16 at Atlanta Motor Speedway. Geoff Bodine won the pole at a speed of 197.478 mph (317.810 km/h), which at the time was the fastest qualifying lap ever run outside of Daytona and Talladega. The race was broadcast on ESPN.

Top ten results

1. #18 - Bobby Labonte*
2. #88 - Dale Jarrett*
3. #6 - Mark Martin*
4. #29 - Jeff Green
5. #36 - Derrike Cope
6. #44 - Kyle Petty
7. #43 - Bobby Hamilton
8. #42 - Joe Nemechek
9. #22 - Ward Burton
10. #30 - Johnny Benson

Failed to qualify: #8 - Hut Stricklin, #35 - Todd Bodine, #40 - Greg Sacks, #71 - Dave Marcis, #77 - Robert Pressley, #95 - Ed Berrier, #96 - David Green

- Jeff Gordon entered the race 77-points ahead of Dale Jarrett and 88-points ahead of Mark Martin. Gordon had to finish 18th or better to clinch the championship.
- During a practice session on Saturday, Gordon was driving down the pit lane, scrubbing his tires to heat them up on what was a cold morning. Gordon lost control and crashed into Bobby Hamilton's parked car. Gordon had to go to a backup car, and qualified all the way back in 37th.
- Despite Jarrett and Martin finishing 2nd and 3rd while Gordon finished 17th, Gordon ultimately hung on and won the championship by only 14 points over Jarrett and 29 points over Martin, the closest three-way points finish under the Bob Latford 1975 points system.
- This was Joe Gibbs Racing's only victory of 1997, and their first since switching from Chevrolet to Pontiac.
- During the summer, the track had been reconfigured from a traditional oval to a quad-shaped oval.
- Bobby Labonte won the first race on the new 1.54 mile configuration on Atlanta and became the first driver to win on both configurations of the track.

=== NASCAR Thunder Special Suzuka ===
The NASCAR Thunder Special Suzuka was a non points exhibition race held November 23 on the Suzuka Circuit - East Circuit in Japan. Mark Martin won the pole. The race was broadcast on TBS.

Top ten results

1. #31 - Mike Skinner
2. #6 - Mark Martin
3. #74 - Randy LaJoie
4. #96 - David Green
5. #21 - Michael Waltrip
6. #09 - Jim Richards
7. #72 - Kenny Wallace
8. #38 - Butch Gilliland
9. #5 - Jack Sprague
10. #7 - Geoff Bodine
- Bill France Jr. suffered a mild heart attack during the trip to Japan. He recovered to live nearly another ten years.
- Rain tires were used on Winston Cup cars for the first time ever during qualifying and practice sessions.

== Final points' standings ==
=== Drivers' championship ===
(key) Bold - Pole position awarded by time. Italics - Pole position set by owner's points standings. * – Most laps led.

Pos	Driver	DAY	CAR	RCH	ATL	DAR	TEX	BRI	MAR	SON	TAL	CLT	DOV	POC	MCH	CAL	DAY	NHA	POC	IND	GLN	MCH	BRI	DAR	RCH	NHA	DOV	MAR	CLT	TAL	CAR	PHO	ATL	Points
1	Jeff Gordon	1	1	4	42	3	30	1	1*	2	5	**1**	26	1	5	1*	21	23	2	4	1*	2	35	1	3	1*	7	4	5	35	4	17	17	4710
2	Dale Jarrett	23	2*	3*	1*	**1***	2	4	16	4	35	27	32*	3	**6**	8	5	38	1*	3	32	5	1*	3	1	6	5	12	1	21	2	1	2	4696
3	Mark Martin	7*	**13**	13	6	24	38	5	3	**1***	1	3	2	4	3	10	27	5	5	6	5	1*	2	8	25	9	**1***	11	4	30	6	6	3	4681
4	Jeff Burton	11	3	42	5	4	1	42	15	9	8	5	3	2	14	30	8	1*	3	15	29	8	4	2	2*	14	11	1	6	14	38	13	34	4285
5	Dale Earnhardt	31	11	25	8	15	6	6	12	12	2*	7	16	10	7	16	4	2	12	29	16	9	14	30	15	8	2	2	3	29	8	5	16	4216
6	Terry Labonte	2	7	7	9	13	4*	3	4	3	6	8	14	9	39	2	2	7	35	40	8	10	7	6	17	41	37	22	11	1*	7	11	21	4177
7	Bobby Labonte	21	14	8	4	5	3	34	8	20	3	6	**40**	31	9	6	10	27	11	2	37	6	8	**7**	34	15	4	27	2*	2	**11**	23	1*	4101
8	Bill Elliott	4	22	15	38	16	11	7	37	32	18	4	8	32	2	32	33	6	10	8	7	7	16	4*	**30**	11	8	5	7	13	12	15	36	3836
9	Rusty Wallace	41	6	1	31	6	37	**2***	5	40	37	2	39	22	29	14	6	3	37	38	3	13	12	43	5	21	16	15*	12	10	18	2*	32	3598
10	Ken Schrader	33	18	35	25	8	18	12	10	31	12	38	6	23	27	34	15	**11**	14	11	14	14	6	10	14	**37**	12	9	15	4	30	4	20	3576
11	Johnny Benson	28	27	9	11	10	28	31	17	21	9	15	21	27	10	13	16	18	13	7	11	**24**	18	19	13	19	28	19	10	19	36	7	10	3575
12	Ted Musgrave	13	12	20	34	2	35	38	24	11	24	23	11	6	4*	4	12	26	4	33	6	3	15	29	9	30	24	21	17	11	32	22	31	3556
13	Jeremy Mayfield	6	16	17	37	17	32	9	7	27	23	28	4	5	12	12	13	17	9	5	15	33	30	16	10	25	23	18	27	26	15	19	19	3547
14	Ernie Irvan	20	9	36	2	21	36	39	31	8	10	13*	30	29	1	37	9	8	40	**10***	21	4	41	33	23	2	9	10	18	**5**	28	18	12	3534
15	Kyle Petty	14	29	10	13	33	27	29	40	13	40	14	5	14	26	31	7	13	8	13	26	23	36	32	20	12	3	26	9	7	22	9	6	3455
16	Bobby Hamilton	15	28	5	10	37	20	13	2	19	31	29	17	**39**	32	23	20	31	32	20	28	26	22	20	38	3	13	3	21	20	1	**3**	7	3450
17	Ricky Rudd	9	4	6	30	23	5	27	13	34	11	10	1	21	13	3	34	9	36	1	40	29	19	5	28	42	6	13	41	34	40	36	37	3330
18	Michael Waltrip	32	26	27	7	7	9	21	26	7	14	17	7	13	16	11	35	29	22	39	25	22	25	9	35	32	42	36	24	28	14	26	13	3173
19	Ricky Craven	3	5	14	35	40			22	39	27	37	13	16	18	9	37	16	18	16	17	12	13	31	18	5	41	8	25	6	3*	43	39	3108
20	Jimmy Spencer	35	40	22	32	22	39	15	11	14	7	18	22	19	15	5	31	12	7	24	34	19	27	28	11	7	36	33	42	24	43	14	24	3079
21	Steve Grissom	40	24	11	33	DNQ	10	32	20	17	41	11	24	18	38	17	38	4	30	26	9	25	5	21	12	4	21	40	13	32	24	8	28	3061
22	Geoff Bodine	34	8	2	20	9	14	33	29	44	43		42	8	40	35	DNQ	10	17	DNQ	2	11	9	12	4	16	14	28	**43**	8	19	10	**33**	3046
23	John Andretti	25	34	31	15	25	12	24	28	30	**4**	30	29	40	37	21	1*	14	24	17	20	35	11	37	22	17	15	29	32	3	31	39	22	3019
24	Ward Burton	8	23	24	12	18	7	18	18	10	42	36	34	38*	35	28	26	36	15	19	41	28	17	27	7	23	22	**7**	8	DNQ	26	42	9	2987
25	Sterling Marlin	5	20	19	23	32	8	20	21	26	39	40	10	15	17	36	3	22	20	43	13	43	10	40	39	39	27	39	20	38	9	27	11	2954
26	Darrell Waltrip	10	32	16	16	11	43	25	9	5	32	21	28	7	24	15	14	33	26	14	18	15	42	26	32	32	32	24	DNQ	37	29	12	40	2942
27	Derrike Cope	36	31	30	DNQ	20	41	16	34	18	13	12	20	11	8	29	28	20	16	41	38	16	32	14	16	26	30	36	33	18	20	16	5	2901
28	Joe Nemechek	27	35	39	39		29	19	19	DNQ	19	19	15	36	41	**18**	24	40	**21**	32	12	27	38	23	6	13	20	25	16	31	10	24	8	2754
29	Brett Bodine	18	17	23	18	35	19	10	27	6	33	26	33	25	19	26	23	42	29	18	39	31	31	15	21	33	26	17	30	22	DNQ	33	41	2716
30	Mike Skinner **(R)**	**12**	25	26	21	30	22	35	32	16	16	34	9	41	42	33	**41**	21	6	9	19	30	34	36	29	35	19	31	DNQ	33	23	28	23	2669
31	Dick Trickle	30	19	29	28	DNQ	23	11	30	DNQ	15	33	41	26	23	22	25	25	19	DNQ		39	3	13	19	22	18	42	14	23	5	40	14	2629
32	Rick Mast	DNQ	21	18	17	19	31	17	36	DNQ	22	20	12	20	30	41	18	28	25	23	23	38	33	34	26	20	10	23	DNQ	9	42	31	35	2569
33	Kenny Wallace	22	41	40	29	14	13	41	**6**	36	24	39	27	34	43	DNQ	11	19	34	30	27	32	**39**	24	24	27	38	6	28	15	37	35	30	2462
34	Hut Stricklin	19	36	32	41	26	33	26	14	29	36	25	19	24	22	42	36	15	23	DNQ	36	36	23	17	27	10	17	16	35	DNQ	25	30	DNQ	2423
35	Lake Speed	24	15	12	22	36	16	36	25		21	24			11	20	29			12		21	29	18	36	18		14	38	36	17	37	26	2301
36	Chad Little	DNQ	DNQ	34	19	27	26	8	42	DNQ	34	DNQ	31	DNQ	25	19	42	30	28	42	42	42	20	11	40	28	29	35	23	40	16	25	18	2081
37	David Green **(R)**	DNQ	38	33	24	41	DNQ	22	DNQ	DNQ	38	16	18	28	28	25	19	24	39	35	22	20	40		37	40	25	20	31	16	27	29	DNQ	2038
38	Morgan Shepherd	29	10	43	3	12	24	28	35	23	28	9	38	12	DNQ	24	32	37	27	DNQ	DNQ	40	DNQ	DNQ	DNQ		31	DNQ	22	12	34	DNQ	27	2033
39	Jeff Green **(R)**											22	37	35	31	7	DNQ	32	31	25	30	18	21	39	31	38	40	30	29	DNQ	21	32	4	1624
40	Robby Gordon **(R)**	16	33	28	**14**	34	34	43	41	41	QL	41				QL	22	34	42	28	4	17	DNQ	22	42	24	33							1495
41	Wally Dallenbach Jr.	42			DNQ		DNQ			15	17	35	36	17	20	39	39		38	36	10	41	26	41	41	31		34	37	41	35	DNQ	38	1475
42	Dave Marcis	17	30	37	DNQ	28	15	30	38	25	30	DNQ	25	DNQ	34	40	17	35	41	DNQ	DNQ	DNQ	DNQ	DNQ	DNQ	29	34	DNQ	DNQ	25	DNQ	34	DNQ	1405
43	Robert Pressley	39	37	21	DNQ	39	DNQ	14	23	DNQ	29															43	39	38	36	27	13	38	DNQ	984
44	Gary Bradberry	DNQ	DNQ	38	40	38	DNQ	37	DNQ	43	DNQ	31	35	33	DNQ							27	37	25	DNQ	34	35	DNQ	34	DNQ	40	DNQ	42	868
45	Greg Sacks	37	39	DNQ	27	29	40	DNQ			25			42	DNQ	27			DNQ	31				DNQ					DNQ	39	39	21	DNQ	778
46	Mike Wallace	DNQ	DNQ	DNQ	26	43	17	DNQ	39	22	DNQ	DNQ	23	30	DNQ	DNQ				DNQ														541
47	Bobby Hillin Jr.	38	42	41	DNQ	42	42	DNQ	33	35	20	DNQ	43	37					DNQ	DNQ	DNQ													511
48	Lance Hooper								DNQ	42											24	34	24	35	33	DNQ								402
49	Kenny Irwin Jr.																								8			37			DNQ	20	25	390
50	Billy Standridge	DNQ	DNQ	DNQ	36	DNQ	21	DNQ	DNQ		DNQ	32	DNQ	DNQ	33	DNQ	40	DNQ												42				366
51	Steve Park																		DNQ		33					DNQ	DNQ	41	DNQ		33	41	15	326
52	Todd Bodine						25					42									**35**			42		QL	QL		26				DNQ	310
53	Rick Wilson						DNQ								21					21									19					306
54	Jerry Nadeau														36	38	30	39	33															287
55	Ed Berrier				DNQ		DNQ	23			DNQ	DNQ	DNQ		DNQ					27			28							DNQ				255
56	Kevin Lepage																									DNQ			40	17			29	231
57	Jeff Purvis																			37				38					39					152
58	Loy Allen Jr.	26	43														DNQ																	119
59	Ron Barfield Jr.																			22														97
60	Butch Gilliland									24																						Wth		91
61	Tom Hubert									28																								79
62	Phil Parsons					31																												70
63	Dorsey Schroeder																				31													70
64	Sean Woodside									33																								64
65	Rich Bickle																			34														61
66	Jeff Davis									37																								52
67	Larry Gunselman									38																								49
68	Jack Sprague							40																								DNQ		43
69	Randy MacDonald								DNQ									41								Wth								40
70	Buckshot Jones																																43	34
71	Delma Cowart	DNQ																																
72	Norm Benning	DNQ																																
73	Larry Pearson	DNQ																		Wth														
74	Mike Miller				DNQ																													
75	Randy LaJoie						DNQ																											
76	H. B. Bailey						DNQ																											
77	Mike Bliss						DNQ																		DNQ									
78	R. K. Smith									DNQ																								
79	Gary Smith									DNQ																								
80	Chuck Pruett									DNQ																								
81	Bill McAnally									DNQ																								
82	Scott Gaylord									DNQ																								
83	Wayne Jacks									DNQ																								
84	Rick Scribner									DNQ																								
85	Phil Barkdoll	QL									DNQ																							
86	Tim Steele																			DNQ													Wth	
87	Ron Hornaday Jr.																								DNQ									
88	A. J. Foyt																			Wth														
Pos	Driver	DAY	CAR	RCH	ATL	DAR	TEX	BRI	MAR	SON	TAL	CLT	DOV	POC	MCH	CAL	DAY	NHA	POC	IND	GLN	MCH	BRI	DAR	RCH	NHA	DOV	MAR	CLT	TAL	CAR	PHO	ATL	Points

== NASCAR Rookie of the Year ==
After running the Cup series part-time for a decade, Mike Skinner finally ran a full-time schedule, and walked away with three top-tens and the Rookie of the Year title. His closest runner-up was David Green, despite the fact Green did not finish any higher than sixteenth. Third place was Green's brother Jeff, who came into the season midway with Diamond Ridge Motorsports. The last place finisher was Robby Gordon, who suffered through a tumultuous season with Team SABCO, dealing with injuries and personal disputes.

== See also ==
- 1997 NASCAR Busch Series
- 1997 NASCAR Craftsman Truck Series
- 1997 NASCAR Winston West Series
- 1997 NASCAR Goody's Dash Series
