= 1997 Goody's Headache Powder 500 (Bristol) =

22nd race of the 1997 NASCAR Winston Cup Series

Race details
- Race 22 of 32 in the 1997 NASCAR Winston Cup Series
- The 1997 Goody's Headache Powder 500 program cover.
- Date: August 23, 1997
- Location: Bristol, Tennessee, Bristol Motor Speedway
- Course: Permanent racing facility
- Course length: 0.533 miles (0.858 km)
- Distance: 500 laps, 266.5 mi (428.89 km)
- Average speed: 80.013 miles per hour (128.768 km/h)

Pole position
Driver	Kenny Wallace	FILMAR Racing
- Time: 15.595

Most laps led
Driver	Dale Jarrett	Robert Yates Racing
- Laps: 210

Winner
No. 88	Dale Jarrett	Robert Yates Racing

Television in the United States
- Network: ESPN
- Announcers: Bob Jenkins, Ned Jarrett, Benny Parsons

Radio in the United States
- Radio: Performance Racing Network

The 1997 Goody's Headache Powder 500 was the 22nd stock car race of the 1997 NASCAR Winston Cup Series and the 37th iteration of the event. The race was held on Saturday, August 23, 1997, in Bristol, Tennessee at Bristol Motor Speedway, a 0.533 miles (0.858 km) permanent oval-shaped racetrack. The race took the scheduled 500 laps to complete. In the final laps of the race, Robert Yates Racing driver Dale Jarrett would manage to take the lead with 30 laps to go and pull away to take his 12th career NASCAR Winston Cup Series victory and his fourth of the season. To fill out the top three, Roush Racing driver Mark Martin and Donlavey Racing driver Dick Trickle would finish second and third, respectively.

== Background ==
The layout of Bristol Motor Speedway, the venue where the race was held.

The Bristol Motor Speedway, formerly known as Bristol International Raceway and Bristol Raceway, is a NASCAR short track venue located in Bristol, Tennessee. Constructed in 1960, it held its first NASCAR race on July 30, 1961. Despite its short length, Bristol is among the most popular tracks on the NASCAR schedule because of its distinct features, which include extraordinarily steep banking, an all concrete surface, two pit roads, and stadium-like seating. It has also been named one of the loudest NASCAR tracks.

=== Entry list ===
- (R) denotes rookie driver.

#	Driver	Team	Make
1	Lance Hooper	Precision Products Racing	Pontiac
2	Rusty Wallace	Penske Racing South	Ford
3	Dale Earnhardt	Richard Childress Racing	Chevrolet
4	Sterling Marlin	Morgan–McClure Motorsports	Chevrolet
5	Terry Labonte	Hendrick Motorsports	Chevrolet
6	Mark Martin	Roush Racing	Ford
7	Geoff Bodine	Geoff Bodine Racing	Ford
8	Hut Stricklin	Stavola Brothers Racing	Ford
9	Lake Speed	Melling Racing	Ford
10	Ricky Rudd	Rudd Performance Motorsports	Ford
11	Brett Bodine	Brett Bodine Racing	Ford
16	Ted Musgrave	Roush Racing	Ford
17	Darrell Waltrip	Darrell Waltrip Motorsports	Chevrolet
18	Bobby Labonte	Joe Gibbs Racing	Pontiac
21	Michael Waltrip	Wood Brothers Racing	Ford
22	Ward Burton	Bill Davis Racing	Pontiac
23	Jimmy Spencer	Haas-Carter Motorsports	Ford
24	Jeff Gordon	Hendrick Motorsports	Chevrolet
25	Ricky Craven	Hendrick Motorsports	Chevrolet
28	Ernie Irvan	Robert Yates Racing	Ford
29	Jeff Green (R)	Diamond Ridge Motorsports	Chevrolet
30	Johnny Benson Jr.	Bahari Racing	Pontiac
31	Mike Skinner (R)	Richard Childress Racing	Chevrolet
33	Ken Schrader	Andy Petree Racing	Chevrolet
36	Derrike Cope	MB2 Motorsports	Pontiac
37	Jeremy Mayfield	Kranefuss-Haas Racing	Ford
40	Robby Gordon (R)	Team SABCO	Chevrolet
41	Steve Grissom	Larry Hedrick Motorsports	Chevrolet
42	Joe Nemechek	Team SABCO	Chevrolet
43	Bobby Hamilton	Petty Enterprises	Pontiac
44	Kyle Petty	Petty Enterprises	Pontiac
46	Wally Dallenbach Jr.	Team SABCO	Chevrolet
71	Dave Marcis	Marcis Auto Racing	Chevrolet
75	Rick Mast	Butch Mock Motorsports	Ford
77	Morgan Shepherd	Jasper Motorsports	Ford
78	Gary Bradberry	Triad Motorsports	Ford
81	Kenny Wallace	FILMAR Racing	Ford
88	Dale Jarrett	Robert Yates Racing	Ford
90	Dick Trickle	Donlavey Racing	Ford
94	Bill Elliott	Bill Elliott Racing	Ford
95	Ed Berrier	Sadler Brothers Racing	Chevrolet
96	David Green (R)	American Equipment Racing	Chevrolet
97	Chad Little	Roush Racing	Pontiac
98	John Andretti	Cale Yarborough Motorsports	Ford
99	Jeff Burton	Roush Racing	Ford

== Qualifying ==
Qualifying was split into two rounds. The first round was held on Friday, August 22, at 5:30 PM EST. Each driver would have one lap to set a time. During the first round, the top 25 drivers in the round would be guaranteed a starting spot in the race. If a driver was not able to guarantee a spot in the first round, they had the option to scrub their time from the first round and try and run a faster lap time in a second round qualifying run, held on Saturday, August 23, at 12:30 PM EST. As with the first round, each driver would have one lap to set a time. Positions 26-38 would be decided on time, and depending on who needed it, the 39th thru either the 42nd, 43rd, or 44th position would be based on provisionals. Four spots are awarded by the use of provisionals based on owner's points. The fifth is awarded to a past champion who has not otherwise qualified for the race. If no past champion needs the provisional, the field would be limited to 42 cars. If a champion needed it, the field would expand to 43 cars. If the race was a companion race with the NASCAR Winston West Series, four spots would be determined by NASCAR Winston Cup Series provisionals, while the final two spots would be given to teams in the Winston West Series, leaving the field at 44 cars.

Kenny Wallace, driving for FILMAR Racing, would win the pole, setting a time of 15.595 and an average speed of 123.039 miles per hour (198.012 km/h).

Three drivers would fail to qualify: Morgan Shepherd, Robby Gordon, and Dave Marcis.

=== Full qualifying results ===
Pos.	#	Driver	Team	Make	Time	Speed
1	81	Kenny Wallace	FILMAR Racing	Ford	15.595	123.039
2	24	Jeff Gordon	Hendrick Motorsports	Chevrolet	15.616	122.874
3	88	Dale Jarrett	Robert Yates Racing	Ford	15.634	122.733
4	90	Dick Trickle	Donlavey Racing	Ford	15.634	122.733
5	6	Mark Martin	Roush Racing	Ford	15.640	122.685
6	33	Ken Schrader	Andy Petree Racing	Chevrolet	15.645	122.646
7	4	Sterling Marlin	Morgan–McClure Motorsports	Chevrolet	15.657	122.552
8	96	David Green (R)	American Equipment Racing	Chevrolet	15.659	122.537
9	36	Derrike Cope	MB2 Motorsports	Pontiac	15.664	122.497
10	22	Ward Burton	Bill Davis Racing	Pontiac	15.669	122.458
11	46	Wally Dallenbach Jr.	Team SABCO	Chevrolet	15.674	122.419
12	16	Ted Musgrave	Roush Racing	Ford	15.687	122.318
13	99	Jeff Burton	Roush Racing	Ford	15.697	122.240
14	25	Ricky Craven	Hendrick Motorsports	Chevrolet	15.700	122.217
15	7	Geoff Bodine	Geoff Bodine Racing	Ford	15.700	122.217
16	2	Rusty Wallace	Penske Racing South	Ford	15.704	122.185
17	23	Jimmy Spencer	Travis Carter Enterprises	Ford	15.716	122.092
18	37	Jeremy Mayfield	Kranefuss-Haas Racing	Ford	15.719	122.069
19	5	Terry Labonte	Hendrick Motorsports	Chevrolet	15.722	122.046
20	98	John Andretti	Cale Yarborough Motorsports	Ford	15.724	122.030
21	95	Ed Berrier	Sadler Brothers Racing	Chevrolet	15.727	122.007
22	30	Johnny Benson Jr.	Bahari Racing	Pontiac	15.741	121.898
23	17	Darrell Waltrip	Darrell Waltrip Motorsports	Chevrolet	15.742	121.890
24	44	Kyle Petty	Petty Enterprises	Pontiac	15.757	121.774
25	9	Lake Speed	Melling Racing	Ford	15.773	121.651
26	78	Gary Bradberry	Triad Motorsports	Ford	15.711	122.131
27	42	Joe Nemechek	Team SABCO	Chevrolet	15.777	121.620
28	1	Lance Hooper	Precision Products Racing	Pontiac	15.780	121.597
29	43	Bobby Hamilton	Petty Enterprises	Pontiac	15.781	121.589
30	29	Jeff Green (R)	Diamond Ridge Motorsports	Chevrolet	15.784	121.566
31	31	Mike Skinner (R)	Richard Childress Racing	Chevrolet	15.790	121.520
32	28	Ernie Irvan	Robert Yates Racing	Ford	15.792	121.505
33	21	Michael Waltrip	Wood Brothers Racing	Ford	15.793	121.497
34	3	Dale Earnhardt	Richard Childress Racing	Chevrolet	15.794	121.489
35	41	Steve Grissom	Larry Hedrick Motorsports	Chevrolet	15.796	121.474
36	94	Bill Elliott	Bill Elliott Racing	Ford	15.803	121.420
37	97	Chad Little	Roush Racing	Pontiac	15.812	121.351
38	18	Bobby Labonte	Joe Gibbs Racing	Pontiac	15.814	121.336
Provisionals
39	10	Ricky Rudd	Rudd Performance Motorsports	Ford	-*	-*
40	11	Brett Bodine	Brett Bodine Racing	Ford	-*	-*
41	75	Rick Mast	Butch Mock Motorsports	Ford	-*	-*
42	8	Hut Stricklin	Stavola Brothers Racing	Ford	-*	-*
Failed to qualify
43	77	Morgan Shepherd	Jasper Motorsports	Ford	-*	-*
44	40	Robby Gordon (R)	Team SABCO	Chevrolet	-*	-*
45	71	Dave Marcis	Marcis Auto Racing	Chevrolet	-*	-*
Official qualifying results

== Race results ==
Fin	St	#	Driver	Team	Make	Laps	Led	Status	Pts	Winnings
1	3	88	Dale Jarrett	Robert Yates Racing	Ford	500	210	running	185	$101,550
2	5	6	Mark Martin	Roush Racing	Ford	500	84	running	175	$46,775
3	4	90	Dick Trickle	Donlavey Racing	Ford	500	0	running	165	$42,625
4	13	99	Jeff Burton	Roush Racing	Ford	500	7	running	165	$40,875
5	35	41	Steve Grissom	Larry Hedrick Motorsports	Chevrolet	500	0	running	155	$37,125
6	6	33	Ken Schrader	Andy Petree Racing	Chevrolet	500	0	running	150	$29,465
7	19	5	Terry Labonte	Hendrick Motorsports	Chevrolet	500	0	running	146	$39,440
8	38	18	Bobby Labonte	Joe Gibbs Racing	Pontiac	500	0	running	142	$32,530
9	15	7	Geoff Bodine	Geoff Bodine Racing	Ford	500	0	running	138	$28,615
10	7	4	Sterling Marlin	Morgan–McClure Motorsports	Chevrolet	498	0	running	134	$37,665
11	20	98	John Andretti	Cale Yarborough Motorsports	Ford	498	0	running	130	$27,915
12	16	2	Rusty Wallace	Penske Racing South	Ford	498	0	running	127	$33,415
13	14	25	Ricky Craven	Hendrick Motorsports	Chevrolet	497	0	running	124	$27,465
14	34	3	Dale Earnhardt	Richard Childress Racing	Chevrolet	497	0	running	121	$32,515
15	12	16	Ted Musgrave	Roush Racing	Ford	497	0	running	118	$28,710
16	36	94	Bill Elliott	Bill Elliott Racing	Ford	497	0	running	115	$28,860
17	10	22	Ward Burton	Bill Davis Racing	Pontiac	497	0	running	112	$26,610
18	22	30	Johnny Benson Jr.	Bahari Racing	Pontiac	496	0	running	109	$26,460
19	39	10	Ricky Rudd	Rudd Performance Motorsports	Ford	496	0	running	106	$30,750
20	37	97	Chad Little	Roush Racing	Pontiac	495	0	running	103	$21,760
21	30	29	Jeff Green (R)	Diamond Ridge Motorsports	Chevrolet	493	0	running	100	$19,985
22	29	43	Bobby Hamilton	Petty Enterprises	Pontiac	492	0	running	97	$30,435
23	42	8	Hut Stricklin	Stavola Brothers Racing	Ford	489	0	running	94	$25,785
24	28	1	Lance Hooper	Precision Products Racing	Pontiac	483	0	running	91	$25,610
25	33	21	Michael Waltrip	Wood Brothers Racing	Ford	476	0	running	88	$18,465
26	11	46	Wally Dallenbach Jr.	Team SABCO	Chevrolet	475	0	running	85	$14,840
27	17	23	Jimmy Spencer	Travis Carter Enterprises	Ford	468	11	running	87	$24,930
28	21	95	Ed Berrier	Sadler Brothers Racing	Chevrolet	465	0	rear end	79	$14,820
29	25	9	Lake Speed	Melling Racing	Ford	465	0	running	76	$17,810
30	18	37	Jeremy Mayfield	Kranefuss-Haas Racing	Ford	460	0	running	73	$17,800
31	40	11	Brett Bodine	Brett Bodine Racing	Ford	457	0	running	70	$24,290
32	9	36	Derrike Cope	MB2 Motorsports	Pontiac	440	0	running	67	$14,780
33	41	75	Rick Mast	Butch Mock Motorsports	Ford	429	0	running	64	$21,770
34	31	31	Mike Skinner (R)	Richard Childress Racing	Chevrolet	418	0	crash	61	$14,760
35	2	24	Jeff Gordon	Hendrick Motorsports	Chevrolet	365	188	crash	63	$33,955
36	24	44	Kyle Petty	Petty Enterprises	Pontiac	362	0	running	55	$14,735
37	26	78	Gary Bradberry	Triad Motorsports	Ford	346	0	crash	52	$15,217
38	27	42	Joe Nemechek	Team SABCO	Chevrolet	341	0	running	49	$14,700
39	1	81	Kenny Wallace	FILMAR Racing	Ford	277	0	crash	46	$26,700
40	8	96	David Green (R)	American Equipment Racing	Chevrolet	256	0	crash	43	$14,700
41	32	28	Ernie Irvan	Robert Yates Racing	Ford	189	0	overheating	40	$29,700
42	23	17	Darrell Waltrip	Darrell Waltrip Motorsports	Chevrolet	115	0	crash	37	$21,700
Official race results

Previous race: 1997 DeVilbiss 400	NASCAR Winston Cup Series; 1997 season	Next race: 1997 Mountain Dew Southern 500
