= 1997 DeVilbiss 400 =

21st race of the 1997 NASCAR Winston Cup Series

1997 Pepsi 400 presented by DeVilbiss
Race details
- Race 21 of 32 in the 1997 NASCAR Winston Cup Series
- The 1997 DeVilbiss 400 program cover, featuring Ricky Rudd.
- Date: August 17, 1997
- Location: Brooklyn, Michigan, Michigan International Speedway
- Course: Permanent racing facility
- Course length: 2 miles (3.2 km)
- Distance: 200 laps, 400 mi (643.737 km)
- Average speed: 126.883 miles per hour (204.198 km/h)

Pole position
Driver	Johnny Benson Jr.	Bahari Racing
- Time: 39.273

Most laps led
Driver	Mark Martin	Roush Racing
- Laps: 102

Winner
No. 6	Mark Martin	Roush Racing

Television in the United States
- Network: NASCAR on ESPN
- Announcers: Bob Jenkins, Ned Jarrett, Benny Parsons

Radio in the United States
- Radio: Motor Racing Network

The 1997 DeVilbiss 400 was the 21st stock car race of the 1997 NASCAR Winston Cup Series and the 28th iteration of the event. The race was held on Sunday, August 17, 1997, in Brooklyn, Michigan, at Michigan International Speedway, a two-mile (3.2 km) moderate-banked D-shaped speedway. The race took the scheduled 200 laps to complete. At race's end, Roush Racing driver Mark Martin would manage to come back from a blown tire to dominate the late stages of the race to take his 21st career NASCAR Winston Cup Series victory and his third victory of the season. To fill out the top three, Hendrick Motorsports driver Jeff Gordon and Roush Racing driver Ted Musgrave would finish second and third, respectively.

== Background ==
The layout of Michigan International Speedway, the venue where the race was held.

The race was held at Michigan International Speedway, a two-mile (3.2 km) moderate-banked D-shaped speedway located in Brooklyn, Michigan. The track is used primarily for NASCAR events. The track is owned by International Speedway Corporation. MIS is recognized as one of motorsports' premier facilities because of its wide racing surface and high banking (by open-wheel standards; the 18-degree banking is modest by stock car standards).

=== Entry list ===
- (R) denotes rookie driver.

#	Driver	Team	Make
1	Lance Hooper	Precision Products Racing	Pontiac
2	Rusty Wallace	Penske Racing South	Ford
3	Dale Earnhardt	Richard Childress Racing	Chevrolet
4	Sterling Marlin	Morgan–McClure Motorsports	Chevrolet
5	Terry Labonte	Hendrick Motorsports	Chevrolet
6	Mark Martin	Roush Racing	Ford
7	Geoff Bodine	Geoff Bodine Racing	Ford
8	Hut Stricklin	Stavola Brothers Racing	Ford
9	Lake Speed	Melling Racing	Ford
10	Ricky Rudd	Rudd Performance Motorsports	Ford
11	Brett Bodine	Brett Bodine Racing	Ford
16	Ted Musgrave	Roush Racing	Ford
17	Darrell Waltrip	Darrell Waltrip Motorsports	Chevrolet
18	Bobby Labonte	Joe Gibbs Racing	Pontiac
21	Michael Waltrip	Wood Brothers Racing	Ford
22	Ward Burton	Bill Davis Racing	Pontiac
23	Jimmy Spencer	Haas-Carter Motorsports	Ford
24	Jeff Gordon	Hendrick Motorsports	Chevrolet
25	Ricky Craven	Hendrick Motorsports	Chevrolet
28	Ernie Irvan	Robert Yates Racing	Ford
29	Jeff Green (R)	Diamond Ridge Motorsports	Chevrolet
30	Johnny Benson Jr.	Bahari Racing	Pontiac
31	Mike Skinner (R)	Richard Childress Racing	Chevrolet
33	Ken Schrader	Andy Petree Racing	Chevrolet
36	Derrike Cope	MB2 Motorsports	Pontiac
37	Jeremy Mayfield	Kranefuss-Haas Racing	Ford
40	Robby Gordon (R)	Team SABCO	Chevrolet
41	Steve Grissom	Larry Hedrick Motorsports	Chevrolet
42	Joe Nemechek	Team SABCO	Chevrolet
43	Bobby Hamilton	Petty Enterprises	Pontiac
44	Kyle Petty	Petty Enterprises	Pontiac
46	Wally Dallenbach Jr.	Team SABCO	Chevrolet
71	Dave Marcis	Marcis Auto Racing	Chevrolet
75	Rick Mast	Butch Mock Motorsports	Ford
77	Morgan Shepherd	Jasper Motorsports	Ford
78	Gary Bradberry	Triad Motorsports	Ford
81	Kenny Wallace	FILMAR Racing	Ford
88	Dale Jarrett	Robert Yates Racing	Ford
90	Dick Trickle	Donlavey Racing	Ford
94	Bill Elliott	Bill Elliott Racing	Ford
96	David Green (R)	American Equipment Racing	Chevrolet
97	Chad Little	Roush Racing	Pontiac
98	John Andretti	Cale Yarborough Motorsports	Ford
99	Jeff Burton	Roush Racing	Ford

== Qualifying ==
Qualifying was split into two rounds. The first round was held on Friday, August 15. Each driver would have one lap to set a time. During the first round, the top 25 drivers in the round would be guaranteed a starting spot in the race. If a driver was not able to guarantee a spot in the first round, they had the option to scrub their time from the first round and try and run a faster lap time in a second round qualifying run, held on Saturday, August 16. As with the first round, each driver would have one lap to set a time. Positions 26-38 would be decided on time, and depending on who needed it, the 39th thru either the 42nd, 43rd, or 44th position would be based on provisionals. Four spots are awarded by the use of provisionals based on owner's points. The fifth is awarded to a past champion who has not otherwise qualified for the race. If no past champion needs the provisional, the field would be limited to 42 cars. If a champion needed it, the field would expand to 43 cars. If the race was a companion race with the NASCAR Winston West Series, four spots would be determined by NASCAR Winston Cup Series provisionals, while the final two spots would be given to teams in the Winston West Series, leaving the field at 44 cars.

Johnny Benson Jr., driving for Bahari Racing, would win the pole, setting a time of 39.273 and an average speed of 183.332 miles per hour (295.044 km/h).

Dave Marcis was the only driver to fail to qualify.

=== Full qualifying results ===
Pos.	#	Driver	Team	Make	Time	Speed
1	30	Johnny Benson Jr.	Bahari Racing	Pontiac	39.273	183.332
2	6	Mark Martin	Roush Racing	Ford	39.356	182.945
3	25	Ricky Craven	Hendrick Motorsports	Chevrolet	39.360	182.927
4	88	Dale Jarrett	Robert Yates Racing	Ford	39.395	182.764
5	99	Jeff Burton	Roush Racing	Ford	39.420	182.648
6	18	Bobby Labonte	Joe Gibbs Racing	Pontiac	39.441	182.551
7	16	Ted Musgrave	Roush Racing	Ford	39.446	182.528
8	33	Ken Schrader	Andy Petree Racing	Chevrolet	39.448	182.519
9	90	Dick Trickle	Donlavey Racing	Ford	39.450	182.510
10	7	Geoff Bodine	Geoff Bodine Racing	Ford	39.498	182.288
11	46	Wally Dallenbach Jr.	Team SABCO	Chevrolet	39.501	182.274
12	37	Jeremy Mayfield	Kranefuss-Haas Racing	Ford	39.510	182.232
13	29	Jeff Green (R)	Diamond Ridge Motorsports	Chevrolet	39.559	182.007
14	5	Terry Labonte	Hendrick Motorsports	Chevrolet	39.561	181.997
15	77	Morgan Shepherd	Jasper Motorsports	Ford	39.584	181.892
16	36	Derrike Cope	MB2 Motorsports	Pontiac	39.587	181.878
17	24	Jeff Gordon	Hendrick Motorsports	Chevrolet	39.607	181.786
18	97	Chad Little	Roush Racing	Pontiac	39.613	181.759
19	4	Sterling Marlin	Morgan–McClure Motorsports	Chevrolet	39.620	181.726
20	28	Ernie Irvan	Robert Yates Racing	Ford	39.646	181.607
21	75	Rick Mast	Butch Mock Motorsports	Ford	39.647	181.603
22	41	Steve Grissom	Larry Hedrick Motorsports	Chevrolet	39.684	181.433
23	96	David Green (R)	American Equipment Racing	Chevrolet	39.709	181.319
24	94	Bill Elliott	Bill Elliott Racing	Ford	39.738	181.187
25	98	John Andretti	Cale Yarborough Motorsports	Ford	39.739	181.182
26	17	Darrell Waltrip	Darrell Waltrip Motorsports	Chevrolet	39.750	181.132
27	10	Ricky Rudd	Rudd Performance Motorsports	Ford	39.762	181.077
28	3	Dale Earnhardt	Richard Childress Racing	Chevrolet	39.790	180.950
29	40	Robby Gordon (R)	Team SABCO	Chevrolet	39.801	180.900
30	42	Joe Nemechek	Team SABCO	Chevrolet	39.825	180.791
31	21	Michael Waltrip	Wood Brothers Racing	Ford	39.829	180.773
32	1	Lance Hooper	Precision Products Racing	Pontiac	39.829	180.773
33	44	Kyle Petty	Petty Enterprises	Pontiac	39.894	180.478
34	31	Mike Skinner (R)	Richard Childress Racing	Chevrolet	39.938	180.279
35	43	Bobby Hamilton	Petty Enterprises	Pontiac	39.952	180.216
36	78	Gary Bradberry	Triad Motorsports	Ford	39.963	180.167
37	11	Brett Bodine	Brett Bodine Racing	Ford	39.971	180.131
38	8	Hut Stricklin	Stavola Brothers Racing	Ford	40.024	179.892
Provisionals
39	23	Jimmy Spencer	Travis Carter Enterprises	Ford	-*	-*
40	22	Ward Burton	Bill Davis Racing	Pontiac	-*	-*
41	81	Kenny Wallace	FILMAR Racing	Ford	-*	-*
42	9	Lake Speed	Melling Racing	Ford	-*	-*
43	2	Rusty Wallace	Penske Racing South	Ford	-*	-*
Failed to qualify
44	71	Dave Marcis	Marcis Auto Racing	Chevrolet	-*	-*
Official qualifying results

*Time not available.

== Race results ==
Fin	St	#	Driver	Team	Make	Laps	Led	Status	Pts	Winnings
1	2	6	Mark Martin	Roush Racing	Ford	200	102	running	185	$93,045
2	17	24	Jeff Gordon	Hendrick Motorsports	Chevrolet	200	1	running	175	$85,728
3	7	16	Ted Musgrave	Roush Racing	Ford	200	39	running	170	$59,945
4	20	28	Ernie Irvan	Robert Yates Racing	Ford	200	0	running	160	$46,295
5	4	88	Dale Jarrett	Robert Yates Racing	Ford	200	0	running	155	$46,848
6	6	18	Bobby Labonte	Joe Gibbs Racing	Pontiac	200	4	running	155	$42,265
7	24	94	Bill Elliott	Bill Elliott Racing	Ford	200	0	running	146	$38,473
8	5	99	Jeff Burton	Roush Racing	Ford	200	36	running	147	$37,290
9	28	3	Dale Earnhardt	Richard Childress Racing	Chevrolet	200	0	running	138	$37,940
10	14	5	Terry Labonte	Hendrick Motorsports	Chevrolet	200	0	running	134	$47,290
11	10	7	Geoff Bodine	Geoff Bodine Racing	Ford	200	7	running	135	$31,465
12	3	25	Ricky Craven	Hendrick Motorsports	Chevrolet	200	6	running	132	$31,160
13	43	2	Rusty Wallace	Penske Racing South	Ford	200	0	running	124	$36,165
14	8	33	Ken Schrader	Andy Petree Racing	Chevrolet	200	0	running	121	$30,065
15	26	17	Darrell Waltrip	Darrell Waltrip Motorsports	Chevrolet	200	0	running	118	$30,565
16	16	36	Derrike Cope	MB2 Motorsports	Pontiac	200	0	running	115	$22,015
17	29	40	Robby Gordon (R)	Team SABCO	Chevrolet	200	0	running	112	$29,665
18	13	29	Jeff Green (R)	Diamond Ridge Motorsports	Chevrolet	199	0	running	109	$21,265
19	39	23	Jimmy Spencer	Travis Carter Enterprises	Ford	199	0	running	106	$27,965
20	23	96	David Green (R)	American Equipment Racing	Chevrolet	199	0	running	103	$22,865
21	42	9	Lake Speed	Melling Racing	Ford	199	0	running	100	$20,315
22	31	21	Michael Waltrip	Wood Brothers Racing	Ford	199	0	running	97	$27,115
23	33	44	Kyle Petty	Petty Enterprises	Pontiac	199	0	running	94	$19,890
24	1	30	Johnny Benson Jr.	Bahari Racing	Pontiac	199	5	running	96	$32,190
25	22	41	Steve Grissom	Larry Hedrick Motorsports	Chevrolet	199	0	running	88	$26,440
26	35	43	Bobby Hamilton	Petty Enterprises	Pontiac	199	0	running	85	$31,140
27	30	42	Joe Nemechek	Team SABCO	Chevrolet	199	0	running	82	$19,065
28	40	22	Ward Burton	Bill Davis Racing	Pontiac	198	0	running	79	$26,015
29	27	10	Ricky Rudd	Rudd Performance Motorsports	Ford	198	0	running	76	$30,915
30	34	31	Mike Skinner (R)	Richard Childress Racing	Chevrolet	198	0	running	73	$18,365
31	37	11	Brett Bodine	Brett Bodine Racing	Ford	198	0	running	70	$22,690
32	41	81	Kenny Wallace	FILMAR Racing	Ford	198	0	running	67	$22,640
33	12	37	Jeremy Mayfield	Kranefuss-Haas Racing	Ford	198	0	running	64	$15,590
34	32	1	Lance Hooper	Precision Products Racing	Pontiac	198	0	running	61	$22,540
35	25	98	John Andretti	Cale Yarborough Motorsports	Ford	198	0	running	58	$22,490
36	38	8	Hut Stricklin	Stavola Brothers Racing	Ford	198	0	running	55	$22,465
37	36	78	Gary Bradberry	Triad Motorsports	Ford	196	0	running	52	$15,440
38	21	75	Rick Mast	Butch Mock Motorsports	Ford	195	0	running	49	$22,365
39	9	90	Dick Trickle	Donlavey Racing	Ford	195	0	running	46	$15,365
40	15	77	Morgan Shepherd	Jasper Motorsports	Ford	167	0	running	43	$15,365
41	11	46	Wally Dallenbach Jr.	Team SABCO	Chevrolet	164	0	electrical	40	$16,865
42	18	97	Chad Little	Roush Racing	Pontiac	164	0	running	37	$15,365
43	19	4	Sterling Marlin	Morgan–McClure Motorsports	Chevrolet	91	0	engine	34	$31,365
Official race results

Previous race: 1997 The Bud at The Glen	NASCAR Winston Cup Series; 1997 season	Next race: 1997 Goody's Headache Powder 500 (Bristol)
