= 1997 DieHard 500 =

29th race of the 1997 NASCAR Winston Cup Series

Race details
- Race 29 of 32 in the 1997 NASCAR Winston Cup Series
- The 1997 DieHard 500 program cover, featuring Jeff Gordon.
- Date: October 12, 1997
- Official name: 29th Annual DieHard 500
- Location: Lincoln, Alabama, Talladega Superspeedway
- Course: Permanent racing facility
- Course length: 2.66 miles (4.28 km)
- Distance: 188 laps, 500.08 mi (804.8 km)
- Average speed: 156.601 miles per hour (252.025 km/h)

Pole position
Driver	Ernie Irvan	Robert Yates Racing
- Time: 49.547

Most laps led
Driver	Terry Labonte	Hendrick Motorsports
- Laps: 70

Winner
No. 5	Terry Labonte	Hendrick Motorsports

Television in the United States
- Network: CBS
- Announcers: Mike Joy, Ned Jarrett, Buddy Baker

Radio in the United States
- Radio: Motor Racing Network

The 1997 DieHard 500 was the 29th stock car race of the 1997 NASCAR Winston Cup Series and the 38th iteration of the event. The race was held on Sunday, October 12, 1997, in Lincoln, Alabama at Talladega Superspeedway, a 2.66 miles (4.28 km) permanent triangle-shaped superspeedway. The race took the scheduled 188 laps to complete. In the final three laps of the race, with help from brother Bobby Labonte, Hendrick Motorsports driver Terry Labonte would make a late-race charge through the field to take his 19th career NASCAR Winston Cup Series victory and his only victory of the season. To fill out the top three, the aforementioned Joe Gibbs Racing driver Bobby Labonte and Cale Yarborough Motorsports driver John Andretti would finish second and third, respectively.

The drivers who finished in the top five (Terry Labonte, Bobby Labonte, John Andretti, Ken Schrader, and Ernie Irvan) qualified for the new Winston No Bull 5 program for the 1998 NASCAR Winston Cup Series season. If either of these drivers won the next season's 1998 Daytona 500, they would win a $1 million bonus. The Winston No Bull 5 essentially replaced the Winston Million.

== Background ==
The layout of Talladega Superspeedway, the venue where the race was held.

Talladega Superspeedway, originally known as Alabama International Motor Superspeedway (AIMS), is a motorsports complex located north of Talladega, Alabama. It is located on the former Anniston Air Force Base in the small city of Lincoln. The track is a tri-oval and was constructed in the 1960s by the International Speedway Corporation, a business controlled by the France family. Talladega is most known for its steep banking and the unique location of the start/finish line that's located just past the exit to pit road. The track currently hosts the NASCAR series such as the NASCAR Cup Series, Xfinity Series and the Camping World Truck Series. Talladega is the longest NASCAR oval with a length of 2.66-mile-long (4.28 km) tri-oval like the Daytona International Speedway, which also is a 2.5-mile-long (4 km) tri-oval.

=== Entry list ===
- (R) denotes rookie driver.

#	Driver	Team	Make
1	Morgan Shepherd	Precision Products Racing	Pontiac
2	Rusty Wallace	Penske Racing South	Ford
3	Dale Earnhardt	Richard Childress Racing	Chevrolet
4	Sterling Marlin	Morgan–McClure Motorsports	Chevrolet
5	Terry Labonte	Hendrick Motorsports	Chevrolet
6	Mark Martin	Roush Racing	Ford
7	Geoff Bodine	Geoff Bodine Racing	Ford
8	Hut Stricklin	Stavola Brothers Racing	Ford
9	Lake Speed	Melling Racing	Ford
10	Ricky Rudd	Rudd Performance Motorsports	Ford
11	Brett Bodine	Brett Bodine Racing	Ford
16	Ted Musgrave	Roush Racing	Ford
17	Darrell Waltrip	Darrell Waltrip Motorsports	Chevrolet
18	Bobby Labonte	Joe Gibbs Racing	Pontiac
21	Michael Waltrip	Wood Brothers Racing	Ford
22	Ward Burton	Bill Davis Racing	Pontiac
23	Jimmy Spencer	Haas-Carter Motorsports	Ford
24	Jeff Gordon	Hendrick Motorsports	Chevrolet
25	Ricky Craven	Hendrick Motorsports	Chevrolet
28	Ernie Irvan	Robert Yates Racing	Ford
29	Jeff Green (R)	Diamond Ridge Motorsports	Chevrolet
30	Johnny Benson Jr.	Bahari Racing	Pontiac
31	Mike Skinner (R)	Richard Childress Racing	Chevrolet
33	Ken Schrader	Andy Petree Racing	Chevrolet
36	Derrike Cope	MB2 Motorsports	Pontiac
37	Jeremy Mayfield	Kranefuss-Haas Racing	Ford
40	Elliott Sadler	Team SABCO	Chevrolet
41	Steve Grissom	Larry Hedrick Motorsports	Chevrolet
42	Joe Nemechek	Team SABCO	Chevrolet
43	Bobby Hamilton	Petty Enterprises	Pontiac
44	Kyle Petty	Petty Enterprises	Pontiac
46	Wally Dallenbach Jr.	Team SABCO	Chevrolet
47	Billy Standridge	Standridge Motorsports	Ford
71	Dave Marcis	Marcis Auto Racing	Chevrolet
75	Rick Mast	Butch Mock Motorsports	Ford
77	Robert Pressley	Jasper Motorsports	Ford
78	Gary Bradberry	Triad Motorsports	Ford
81	Kenny Wallace	FILMAR Racing	Ford
88	Dale Jarrett	Robert Yates Racing	Ford
90	Dick Trickle	Donlavey Racing	Ford
91	Kevin Lepage	LJ Racing	Chevrolet
94	Bill Elliott	Bill Elliott Racing	Ford
95	Ed Berrier	Sadler Brothers Racing	Chevrolet
96	David Green (R)	American Equipment Racing	Chevrolet
97	Chad Little	Roush Racing	Pontiac
98	John Andretti	Cale Yarborough Motorsports	Ford
99	Jeff Burton	Roush Racing	Ford

== Qualifying ==
Qualifying was split into two rounds. The first round was held on Friday, October 10, at 3:00 PM EST. Each driver would have one lap to set a time. During the first round, the top 25 drivers in the round would be guaranteed a starting spot in the race. If a driver was not able to guarantee a spot in the first round, they had the option to scrub their time from the first round and try and run a faster lap time in a second round qualifying run, held on Saturday, October 11, at 10:45 AM EST. As with the first round, each driver would have one lap to set a time. Positions 26-38 would be decided on time, and depending on who needed it, the 39th thru either the 42nd, 43rd, or 44th position would be based on provisionals. Four spots are awarded by the use of provisionals based on owner's points. The fifth is awarded to a past champion who has not otherwise qualified for the race. If no past champion needs the provisional, the field would be limited to 42 cars. If a champion needed it, the field would expand to 43 cars. If the race was a companion race with the NASCAR Winston West Series, four spots would be determined by NASCAR Winston Cup Series provisionals, while the final two spots would be given to teams in the Winston West Series, leaving the field at 44 cars.

Ernie Irvan, driving for Robert Yates Racing, would win the pole, setting a time of 49.547 and an average speed of 193.271 miles per hour (311.040 km/h).

Five drivers would fail to qualify: Ward Burton, Hut Stricklin, Gary Bradberry, Jeff Green, and Ed Berrier.

=== Full qualifying results ===
Pos.	#	Driver	Team	Make	Time	Speed
1	28	Ernie Irvan	Robert Yates Racing	Ford	49.547	193.271
2	98	John Andretti	Cale Yarborough Motorsports	Ford	49.574	193.166
3	23	Jimmy Spencer	Travis Carter Enterprises	Ford	49.674	192.777
4	99	Jeff Burton	Roush Racing	Ford	49.690	192.715
5	36	Derrike Cope	MB2 Motorsports	Pontiac	49.691	192.711
6	5	Terry Labonte	Hendrick Motorsports	Chevrolet	49.716	192.614
7	18	Bobby Labonte	Joe Gibbs Racing	Pontiac	49.755	192.463
8	24	Jeff Gordon	Hendrick Motorsports	Chevrolet	49.771	192.401
9	2	Rusty Wallace	Penske Racing South	Ford	49.773	192.393
10	94	Bill Elliott	Bill Elliott Racing	Ford	49.783	192.355
11	77	Robert Pressley	Jasper Motorsports	Ford	49.787	192.339
12	3	Dale Earnhardt	Richard Childress Racing	Chevrolet	49.820	192.212
13	42	Joe Nemechek	Team SABCO	Chevrolet	49.834	192.158
14	33	Ken Schrader	Andy Petree Racing	Chevrolet	49.848	192.104
15	25	Ricky Craven	Hendrick Motorsports	Chevrolet	49.870	192.019
16	31	Mike Skinner (R)	Richard Childress Racing	Chevrolet	49.922	191.819
17	11	Brett Bodine	Brett Bodine Racing	Ford	49.932	191.781
18	88	Dale Jarrett	Robert Yates Racing	Ford	49.959	191.677
19	30	Johnny Benson Jr.	Bahari Racing	Pontiac	50.009	191.486
20	9	Lake Speed	Melling Racing	Ford	50.040	191.367
21	90	Dick Trickle	Donlavey Racing	Ford	50.065	191.271
22	41	Steve Grissom	Larry Hedrick Motorsports	Chevrolet	50.077	191.226
23	75	Rick Mast	Butch Mock Motorsports	Ford	50.080	191.214
24	46	Wally Dallenbach Jr.	Team SABCO	Chevrolet	50.115	191.081
25	7	Geoff Bodine	Geoff Bodine Racing	Ford	50.118	191.069
26	47	Billy Standridge	Standridge Motorsports	Ford	50.070	191.252
27	21	Michael Waltrip	Wood Brothers Racing	Ford	50.170	190.871
28	40	Greg Sacks	Team SABCO	Chevrolet	50.232	190.635
29	1	Morgan Shepherd	Precision Products Racing	Pontiac	50.249	190.571
30	4	Sterling Marlin	Morgan–McClure Motorsports	Chevrolet	50.253	190.556
31	6	Mark Martin	Roush Racing	Ford	50.283	190.442
32	71	Dave Marcis	Marcis Auto Racing	Chevrolet	50.291	190.412
33	17	Darrell Waltrip	Darrell Waltrip Motorsports	Chevrolet	50.361	190.147
34	43	Bobby Hamilton	Petty Enterprises	Pontiac	50.385	190.057
35	81	Kenny Wallace	FILMAR Racing	Ford	50.397	190.011
36	97	Chad Little	Roush Racing	Pontiac	50.401	189.996
37	96	David Green (R)	American Equipment Racing	Chevrolet	50.402	189.992
38	91	Kevin Lepage	LJ Racing	Chevrolet	50.417	189.936
Provisionals
39	16	Ted Musgrave	Roush Racing	Ford	-*	-*
40	37	Jeremy Mayfield	Kranefuss-Haas Racing	Ford	-*	-*
41	10	Ricky Rudd	Rudd Performance Motorsports	Ford	-*	-*
42	44	Kyle Petty	Petty Enterprises	Pontiac	-*	-*
Failed to qualify
43	22	Ward Burton	Bill Davis Racing	Pontiac	-*	-*
44	8	Hut Stricklin	Stavola Brothers Racing	Ford	-*	-*
45	78	Gary Bradberry	Triad Motorsports	Ford	-*	-*
46	29	Jeff Green (R)	Diamond Ridge Motorsports	Chevrolet	-*	-*
47	95	Ed Berrier	Sadler Brothers Racing	Chevrolet	-*	-*
Official qualifying results

*Time not available.

== Race results ==
Fin	St	#	Driver	Team	Make	Laps	Led	Status	Pts	Winnings
1	6	5	Terry Labonte	Hendrick Motorsports	Chevrolet	188	70	running	185	$116,725
2	7	18	Bobby Labonte	Joe Gibbs Racing	Pontiac	188	5	running	175	$76,670
3	2	98	John Andretti	Cale Yarborough Motorsports	Ford	188	1	running	170	$58,530
4	14	33	Ken Schrader	Andy Petree Racing	Chevrolet	188	6	running	165	$53,715
5	1	28	Ernie Irvan	Robert Yates Racing	Ford	188	11	running	160	$57,275
6	15	25	Ricky Craven	Hendrick Motorsports	Chevrolet	188	0	running	150	$41,500
7	42	44	Kyle Petty	Petty Enterprises	Pontiac	188	0	running	146	$32,700
8	25	7	Geoff Bodine	Geoff Bodine Racing	Ford	188	2	running	147	$38,050
9	23	75	Rick Mast	Butch Mock Motorsports	Ford	188	0	running	138	$36,920
10	9	2	Rusty Wallace	Penske Racing South	Ford	188	2	running	139	$42,900
11	39	16	Ted Musgrave	Roush Racing	Ford	188	0	running	130	$38,080
12	29	1	Morgan Shepherd	Precision Products Racing	Pontiac	188	0	running	127	$35,025
13	10	94	Bill Elliott	Bill Elliott Racing	Ford	188	0	running	124	$35,280
14	4	99	Jeff Burton	Roush Racing	Ford	188	0	running	121	$39,410
15	35	81	Kenny Wallace	FILMAR Racing	Ford	188	0	running	118	$36,760
16	37	96	David Green (R)	American Equipment Racing	Chevrolet	188	0	running	115	$28,600
17	38	91	Kevin Lepage	LJ Racing	Chevrolet	188	0	running	112	$23,835
18	5	36	Derrike Cope	MB2 Motorsports	Pontiac	188	0	running	109	$27,280
19	19	30	Johnny Benson Jr.	Bahari Racing	Pontiac	187	0	running	106	$33,950
20	34	43	Bobby Hamilton	Petty Enterprises	Pontiac	187	0	running	103	$39,460
21	18	88	Dale Jarrett	Robert Yates Racing	Ford	187	13	running	105	$39,930
22	17	11	Brett Bodine	Brett Bodine Racing	Ford	187	0	running	97	$33,300
23	21	90	Dick Trickle	Donlavey Racing	Ford	187	0	running	94	$26,290
24	3	23	Jimmy Spencer	Travis Carter Enterprises	Ford	187	11	running	96	$32,940
25	32	71	Dave Marcis	Marcis Auto Racing	Chevrolet	187	0	running	88	$22,460
26	40	37	Jeremy Mayfield	Kranefuss-Haas Racing	Ford	184	0	handling	85	$25,360
27	11	77	Robert Pressley	Jasper Motorsports	Ford	178	0	running	82	$22,240
28	27	21	Michael Waltrip	Wood Brothers Racing	Ford	172	0	running	79	$32,170
29	12	3	Dale Earnhardt	Richard Childress Racing	Chevrolet	167	25	running	81	$48,500
30	31	6	Mark Martin	Roush Racing	Ford	167	5	running	78	$37,030
31	13	42	Joe Nemechek	Team SABCO	Chevrolet	165	0	running	70	$24,440
32	22	41	Steve Grissom	Larry Hedrick Motorsports	Chevrolet	163	0	running	67	$28,870
33	16	31	Mike Skinner (R)	Richard Childress Racing	Chevrolet	159	1	running	69	$21,790
34	41	10	Ricky Rudd	Rudd Performance Motorsports	Ford	153	0	running	61	$36,745
35	8	24	Jeff Gordon	Hendrick Motorsports	Chevrolet	153	3	running	63	$38,915
36	20	9	Lake Speed	Melling Racing	Ford	153	0	running	55	$21,670
37	33	17	Darrell Waltrip	Darrell Waltrip Motorsports	Chevrolet	147	0	crash	52	$28,660
38	30	4	Sterling Marlin	Morgan–McClure Motorsports	Chevrolet	139	27	crash	54	$37,500
39	28	40	Greg Sacks	Team SABCO	Chevrolet	139	5	crash	51	$28,500
40	36	97	Chad Little	Roush Racing	Pontiac	139	0	crash	43	$21,525
41	24	46	Wally Dallenbach Jr.	Team SABCO	Chevrolet	99	1	crash	45	$21,500
42	26	47	Billy Standridge	Standridge Motorsports	Ford	51	0	oil cooler	37	$21,500
Failed to qualify
43		22	Ward Burton	Bill Davis Racing	Pontiac					
44		8	Hut Stricklin	Stavola Brothers Racing	Ford					
45		78	Gary Bradberry	Triad Motorsports	Ford					
46		29	Jeff Green (R)	Diamond Ridge Motorsports	Chevrolet					
47		95	Ed Berrier	Sadler Brothers Racing	Chevrolet					
Official race results

== Media ==
=== Television ===
The Diehard 500 was covered by CBS in the United States for the twenty third and final time. Mike Joy, two-time NASCAR Cup Series champion Ned Jarrett and 1975 race winner Buddy Baker called the race from the broadcast booth. Dick Berggren, Ralph Sheheen and Bill Stephens handled pit road for the television side. Joy replaced Ken Squier in the booth because Squier would serve as host which he would continue till the end of 2000.

CBS
Host	Booth announcers		Pit reporters
Host	Lap-by-lap	Color-commentators	Pit reporters
Ken Squier	Mike Joy	Ned Jarrett; Buddy Baker	Dick Berggren; Ralph Sheheen; Bill Stephens

Previous race: 1997 UAW-GM Quality 500	NASCAR Winston Cup Series; 1997 season	Next race: 1997 AC Delco 400
