= 1997 Hanes 500 =

27th race of the 1997 NASCAR Winston Cup Series

Race details
- Race 27 of 32 in the 1997 NASCAR Winston Cup Series
- The 1997 Hanes 500 program cover.
- Date: September 29, 1997
- Location: Ridgeway, Virginia, Martinsville Speedway
- Course: Permanent racing facility
- Course length: 0.526 miles (0.847 km)
- Distance: 500 laps, 263 mi (423.257 km)
- Average speed: 73.072 miles per hour (117.598 km/h)

Pole position
Driver	Ward Burton	Bill Davis Racing
- Time: 20.272

Most laps led
Driver	Rusty Wallace	Penske Racing South
- Laps: 226

Winner
No. 99	Jeff Burton	Roush Racing

Television in the United States
- Network: ESPN
- Announcers: Bob Jenkins, Ned Jarrett, Benny Parsons

Radio in the United States
- Radio: Motor Racing Network

The 1997 Hanes 500 was the 27th stock car race of the 1997 NASCAR Winston Cup Series and the 49th iteration of the event. The race was originally scheduled to held on Sunday, September 28, 1997, but was postponed until Monday, September 29 due to inclement weather. The race took place in Ridgeway, Virginia at Martinsville Speedway, a 0.526 miles (0.847 km) permanent oval-shaped short track. The race took the scheduled 500 laps to complete. In the late stages of the race, Roush Racing driver Jeff Burton would manage to take advantage of a penalty-stricken Rusty Wallace to take his third career NASCAR Winston Cup Series victory and his third and final victory of the season. To fill out the top three, Richard Childress Racing driver Dale Earnhardt and Petty Enterprises driver Bobby Hamilton would finish second and third, respectively.

== Background ==
The layout of Martinsville Speedway, the venue where the race was held.

Martinsville Speedway is a NASCAR-owned stock car racing track located in Henry County, in Ridgeway, Virginia, just to the south of Martinsville. At 0.526 miles (0.847 km) in length, it is the shortest track in the NASCAR Cup Series. The track was also one of the first paved oval tracks in NASCAR, being built in 1947 by H. Clay Earles. It is also the only remaining race track that has been on the NASCAR circuit from its beginning in 1948.

=== Entry list ===
- (R) denotes rookie driver.

#	Driver	Team	Make
1	Morgan Shepherd	Precision Products Racing	Pontiac
2	Rusty Wallace	Penske Racing South	Ford
3	Dale Earnhardt	Richard Childress Racing	Chevrolet
4	Sterling Marlin	Morgan–McClure Motorsports	Chevrolet
5	Terry Labonte	Hendrick Motorsports	Chevrolet
6	Mark Martin	Roush Racing	Ford
7	Geoff Bodine	Geoff Bodine Racing	Ford
8	Hut Stricklin	Stavola Brothers Racing	Ford
9	Lake Speed	Melling Racing	Ford
10	Ricky Rudd	Rudd Performance Motorsports	Ford
11	Brett Bodine	Brett Bodine Racing	Ford
16	Ted Musgrave	Roush Racing	Ford
17	Darrell Waltrip	Darrell Waltrip Motorsports	Chevrolet
18	Bobby Labonte	Joe Gibbs Racing	Pontiac
21	Michael Waltrip	Wood Brothers Racing	Ford
22	Ward Burton	Bill Davis Racing	Pontiac
23	Jimmy Spencer	Haas-Carter Motorsports	Ford
24	Jeff Gordon	Hendrick Motorsports	Chevrolet
25	Ricky Craven	Hendrick Motorsports	Chevrolet
27	Kenny Irwin Jr.	David Blair Motorsports	Ford
28	Ernie Irvan	Robert Yates Racing	Ford
29	Jeff Green (R)	Diamond Ridge Motorsports	Chevrolet
30	Johnny Benson Jr.	Bahari Racing	Pontiac
31	Mike Skinner (R)	Richard Childress Racing	Chevrolet
33	Ken Schrader	Andy Petree Racing	Chevrolet
36	Derrike Cope	MB2 Motorsports	Pontiac
37	Jeremy Mayfield	Kranefuss-Haas Racing	Ford
40	Steve Park	Team SABCO	Chevrolet
41	Steve Grissom	Larry Hedrick Motorsports	Chevrolet
42	Joe Nemechek	Team SABCO	Chevrolet
43	Bobby Hamilton	Petty Enterprises	Pontiac
44	Kyle Petty	Petty Enterprises	Pontiac
46	Wally Dallenbach Jr.	Team SABCO	Chevrolet
71	Dave Marcis	Marcis Auto Racing	Chevrolet
75	Rick Mast	Butch Mock Motorsports	Ford
77	Robert Pressley	Jasper Motorsports	Ford
78	Gary Bradberry	Triad Motorsports	Ford
81	Kenny Wallace	FILMAR Racing	Ford
88	Dale Jarrett	Robert Yates Racing	Ford
90	Dick Trickle	Donlavey Racing	Ford
94	Bill Elliott	Bill Elliott Racing	Ford
96	David Green (R)	American Equipment Racing	Chevrolet
97	Chad Little	Roush Racing	Pontiac
98	John Andretti	Cale Yarborough Motorsports	Ford
99	Jeff Burton	Roush Racing	Ford

== Qualifying ==
Qualifying was split into two rounds. The first round was held on Friday, September 26. Each driver would have one lap to set a time. During the first round, the top 25 drivers in the round would be guaranteed a starting spot in the race. If a driver was not able to guarantee a spot in the first round, they had the option to scrub their time from the first round and try and run a faster lap time in a second round qualifying run, held on Saturday, September 27. As with the first round, each driver would have one lap to set a time. Positions 26-38 would be decided on time, and depending on who needed it, the 39th thru either the 42nd, 43rd, or 44th position would be based on provisionals. Four spots are awarded by the use of provisionals based on owner's points. The fifth is awarded to a past champion who has not otherwise qualified for the race. If no past champion needs the provisional, the field would be limited to 42 cars. If a champion needed it, the field would expand to 43 cars. If the race was a companion race with the NASCAR Winston West Series, four spots would be determined by NASCAR Winston Cup Series provisionals, while the final two spots would be given to teams in the Winston West Series, leaving the field at 44 cars.

Ward Burton, driving for Bill Davis Racing, would win the pole, setting a time of 20.272 and an average speed of 93.410 miles per hour (150.329 km/h).

Three drivers would fail to qualify: Gary Bradberry, Morgan Shepherd, and Dave Marcis.

=== Full qualifying results ===
Pos.	#	Driver	Team	Make	Time	Speed
1	22	Ward Burton	Bill Davis Racing	Pontiac	20.272	93.410
2	6	Mark Martin	Roush Racing	Ford	20.284	93.354
3	27	Kenny Irwin Jr.	David Blair Motorsports	Ford	20.328	93.152
4	8	Hut Stricklin	Stavola Brothers Racing	Ford	20.329	93.148
5	10	Ricky Rudd	Rudd Performance Motorsports	Ford	20.347	93.065
6	81	Kenny Wallace	FILMAR Racing	Ford	20.359	93.010
7	2	Rusty Wallace	Penske Racing South	Ford	20.363	92.992
8	42	Joe Nemechek	Team SABCO	Chevrolet	20.394	92.851
9	33	Ken Schrader	Andy Petree Racing	Chevrolet	20.399	92.828
10	99	Jeff Burton	Roush Racing	Ford	20.408	92.787
11	24	Jeff Gordon	Hendrick Motorsports	Chevrolet	20.428	92.696
12	23	Jimmy Spencer	Travis Carter Enterprises	Ford	20.435	92.665
13	3	Dale Earnhardt	Richard Childress Racing	Chevrolet	20.439	92.646
14	4	Sterling Marlin	Morgan–McClure Motorsports	Chevrolet	20.445	92.619
15	98	John Andretti	Cale Yarborough Motorsports	Ford	20.453	92.583
16	94	Bill Elliott	Bill Elliott Racing	Ford	20.457	92.565
17	77	Robert Pressley	Jasper Motorsports	Ford	20.459	92.556
18	17	Darrell Waltrip	Darrell Waltrip Motorsports	Chevrolet	20.473	92.493
19	31	Mike Skinner (R)	Richard Childress Racing	Chevrolet	20.478	92.470
20	18	Bobby Labonte	Joe Gibbs Racing	Pontiac	20.485	92.438
21	88	Dale Jarrett	Robert Yates Racing	Ford	20.496	92.389
22	43	Bobby Hamilton	Petty Enterprises	Pontiac	20.500	92.371
23	16	Ted Musgrave	Roush Racing	Ford	20.521	92.276
24	9	Lake Speed	Melling Racing	Ford	20.525	92.258
25	5	Terry Labonte	Hendrick Motorsports	Chevrolet	20.527	92.249
26	30	Johnny Benson Jr.	Bahari Racing	Pontiac	20.369	92.965
27	21	Michael Waltrip	Wood Brothers Racing	Ford	20.431	92.683
28	40	Steve Park	Team SABCO	Chevrolet	20.472	92.497
29	44	Kyle Petty	Petty Enterprises	Pontiac	20.487	92.429
30	28	Ernie Irvan	Robert Yates Racing	Ford	20.492	92.407
31	90	Dick Trickle	Donlavey Racing	Ford	20.525	92.258
32	96	David Green (R)	American Equipment Racing	Chevrolet	20.531	92.231
33	29	Jeff Green (R)	Diamond Ridge Motorsports	Chevrolet	20.535	92.213
34	97	Chad Little	Roush Racing	Pontiac	20.544	92.173
35	46	Wally Dallenbach Jr.	Team SABCO	Chevrolet	20.557	92.115
36	25	Ricky Craven	Hendrick Motorsports	Chevrolet	20.572	92.047
37	7	Geoff Bodine	Geoff Bodine Racing	Ford	20.589	91.971
38	75	Rick Mast	Butch Mock Motorsports	Ford	20.592	91.958
Provisionals
39	37	Jeremy Mayfield	Kranefuss-Haas Racing	Ford	-*	-*
40	41	Steve Grissom	Larry Hedrick Motorsports	Chevrolet	-*	-*
41	11	Brett Bodine	Brett Bodine Racing	Ford	-*	-*
42	36	Derrike Cope	MB2 Motorsports	Pontiac	-*	-*
Failed to qualify
43	78	Gary Bradberry	Triad Motorsports	Ford	-*	-*
44	1	Morgan Shepherd	Precision Products Racing	Pontiac	-*	-*
45	71	Dave Marcis	Marcis Auto Racing	Chevrolet	-*	-*
Official qualifying results

*Time not available.

== Race results ==
Fin	St	#	Driver	Team	Make	Laps	Led	Status	Pts	Winnings
1	10	99	Jeff Burton	Roush Racing	Ford	500	92	running	180	$78,675
2	13	3	Dale Earnhardt	Richard Childress Racing	Chevrolet	500	0	running	170	$65,800
3	22	43	Bobby Hamilton	Petty Enterprises	Pontiac	500	65	running	170	$40,075
4	11	24	Jeff Gordon	Hendrick Motorsports	Chevrolet	500	21	running	165	$40,225
5	16	94	Bill Elliott	Bill Elliott Racing	Ford	500	0	running	155	$34,775
6	6	81	Kenny Wallace	FILMAR Racing	Ford	500	0	running	150	$27,875
7	1	22	Ward Burton	Bill Davis Racing	Pontiac	500	61	running	151	$35,275
8	36	25	Ricky Craven	Hendrick Motorsports	Chevrolet	500	0	running	142	$26,050
9	9	33	Ken Schrader	Andy Petree Racing	Chevrolet	500	0	running	138	$25,345
10	30	28	Ernie Irvan	Robert Yates Racing	Ford	500	0	running	134	$33,345
11	2	6	Mark Martin	Roush Racing	Ford	500	34	running	135	$34,485
12	21	88	Dale Jarrett	Robert Yates Racing	Ford	500	0	running	127	$28,800
13	5	10	Ricky Rudd	Rudd Performance Motorsports	Ford	500	0	running	124	$27,065
14	24	9	Lake Speed	Melling Racing	Ford	500	0	running	121	$15,865
15	7	2	Rusty Wallace	Penske Racing South	Ford	500	226	running	128	$39,065
16	4	8	Hut Stricklin	Stavola Brothers Racing	Ford	499	0	running	115	$23,065
17	41	11	Brett Bodine	Brett Bodine Racing	Ford	499	0	running	112	$22,365
18	39	37	Jeremy Mayfield	Kranefuss-Haas Racing	Ford	499	0	running	109	$16,770
19	26	30	Johnny Benson Jr.	Bahari Racing	Pontiac	499	0	running	106	$21,365
20	32	96	David Green (R)	American Equipment Racing	Chevrolet	499	0	running	103	$15,915
21	23	16	Ted Musgrave	Roush Racing	Ford	499	0	running	100	$20,465
22	25	5	Terry Labonte	Hendrick Motorsports	Chevrolet	499	0	running	97	$31,515
23	38	75	Rick Mast	Butch Mock Motorsports	Ford	499	0	running	94	$20,265
24	18	17	Darrell Waltrip	Darrell Waltrip Motorsports	Chevrolet	498	0	running	91	$20,115
25	8	42	Joe Nemechek	Team SABCO	Chevrolet	498	0	running	88	$12,965
26	29	44	Kyle Petty	Petty Enterprises	Pontiac	498	0	running	85	$12,815
27	20	18	Bobby Labonte	Joe Gibbs Racing	Pontiac	495	0	running	82	$24,665
28	37	7	Geoff Bodine	Geoff Bodine Racing	Ford	490	0	running	79	$19,615
29	15	98	John Andretti	Cale Yarborough Motorsports	Ford	489	0	running	76	$19,565
30	33	29	Jeff Green (R)	Diamond Ridge Motorsports	Chevrolet	464	0	running	73	$12,015
31	19	31	Mike Skinner (R)	Richard Childress Racing	Chevrolet	453	0	suspension	70	$9,465
32	27	21	Michael Waltrip	Wood Brothers Racing	Ford	444	1	crash	72	$16,440
33	12	23	Jimmy Spencer	Travis Carter Enterprises	Ford	428	0	rear end	64	$16,415
34	35	46	Wally Dallenbach Jr.	Team SABCO	Chevrolet	401	0	running	61	$9,390
35	34	97	Chad Little	Roush Racing	Pontiac	394	0	running	58	$9,365
36	42	36	Derrike Cope	MB2 Motorsports	Pontiac	289	0	engine	55	$9,340
37	3	27	Kenny Irwin Jr.	David Blair Motorsports	Ford	257	0	fuel pump	52	$9,325
38	17	77	Robert Pressley	Jasper Motorsports	Ford	240	0	engine	49	$7,075
39	14	4	Sterling Marlin	Morgan–McClure Motorsports	Chevrolet	239	0	crash	46	$23,075
40	40	41	Steve Grissom	Larry Hedrick Motorsports	Chevrolet	198	0	overheating	43	$14,075
41	28	40	Steve Park	Team SABCO	Chevrolet	198	0	engine	40	$14,075
42	31	90	Dick Trickle	Donlavey Racing	Ford	145	0	crash	37	$7,075
Official race results

Previous race: 1997 MBNA 400	NASCAR Winston Cup Series; 1997 season	Next race: 1997 UAW-GM Quality 500
