= 1997 MBNA 400 =

26th race of the 1997 NASCAR Winston Cup Series

Race details
- Race 26 of 32 in the 1997 NASCAR Winston Cup Series
- The 1997 MBNA 400 program cover, featuring Ward Burton.
- Date: September 21, 1997
- Location: Dover, Delaware, Dover International Speedway
- Course: Permanent racing facility
- Course length: 1 miles (1.6 km)
- Distance: 400 laps, 400 mi (643.737 km)
- Average speed: 132.719 miles per hour (213.591 km/h)

Pole position
Driver	Mark Martin	Roush Racing
- Time: 23.679

Most laps led
Driver	Mark Martin	Roush Racing
- Laps: 194

Winner
No. 6	Mark Martin	Roush Racing

Television in the United States
- Network: TNN
- Announcers: Eli Gold, Dick Berggren, Buddy Baker

Radio in the United States
- Radio: Motor Racing Network

The 1997 MBNA 400 was the 26th stock car race of the 1997 NASCAR Winston Cup Series and the 29th iteration of the event. The race was held on Sunday, September 21, 1997, in Dover, Delaware at Dover International Speedway, a 1-mile (1.6 km) permanent oval-shaped racetrack. The race took the scheduled 400 laps to complete. Depending on fuel mileage, Roush Racing driver Mark Martin would manage to save enough fuel to secure his 22nd career NASCAR Winston Cup Series victory and his fourth and final victory of the season. To fill out the top three, Richard Childress Racing driver Dale Earnhardt and Petty Enterprises driver Kyle Petty would finish second and third, respectively.

== Background ==
The layout of Dover International Speedway, the venue where the race was held.

Dover International Speedway is an oval race track in Dover, Delaware. The track features one layout, a 1-mile (1.6 km) concrete oval, with 24° banking in the turns and 9° banking on the straights. The speedway is owned and operated by Speedway Motorsports.

The track, nicknamed "The Monster Mile", was built in 1969 by Melvin Joseph of Melvin L. Joseph Construction Company, Inc., with an asphalt surface, but was replaced with concrete in 1995. Six years later in 2001, the track's capacity moved to 135,000 seats, making the track have the largest capacity of sports venue in the mid-Atlantic. In 2002, the name changed to Dover International Speedway from Dover Downs International Speedway after Dover Downs Gaming and Entertainment split, making Dover Motorsports. From 2007 to 2009, the speedway worked on an improvement project called "The Monster Makeover", which expanded facilities at the track and beautified the track. After the 2014 season, the track's capacity was reduced to 95,500 seats.

=== Entry list ===
- (R) denotes rookie driver.

#	Driver	Team	Make
1	Morgan Shepherd	Precision Products Racing	Pontiac
2	Rusty Wallace	Penske Racing South	Ford
3	Dale Earnhardt	Richard Childress Racing	Chevrolet
4	Sterling Marlin	Morgan–McClure Motorsports	Chevrolet
5	Terry Labonte	Hendrick Motorsports	Chevrolet
6	Mark Martin	Roush Racing	Ford
7	Geoff Bodine	Geoff Bodine Racing	Ford
8	Hut Stricklin	Stavola Brothers Racing	Ford
10	Ricky Rudd	Rudd Performance Motorsports	Ford
11	Brett Bodine	Brett Bodine Racing	Ford
14	Steve Park	Dale Earnhardt, Inc.	Chevrolet
16	Ted Musgrave	Roush Racing	Ford
17	Darrell Waltrip	Darrell Waltrip Motorsports	Chevrolet
18	Bobby Labonte	Joe Gibbs Racing	Pontiac
21	Michael Waltrip	Wood Brothers Racing	Ford
22	Ward Burton	Bill Davis Racing	Pontiac
23	Jimmy Spencer	Haas-Carter Motorsports	Ford
24	Jeff Gordon	Hendrick Motorsports	Chevrolet
25	Ricky Craven	Hendrick Motorsports	Chevrolet
28	Ernie Irvan	Robert Yates Racing	Ford
29	Jeff Green (R)	Diamond Ridge Motorsports	Chevrolet
30	Johnny Benson Jr.	Bahari Racing	Pontiac
31	Mike Skinner (R)	Richard Childress Racing	Chevrolet
33	Ken Schrader	Andy Petree Racing	Chevrolet
36	Derrike Cope	MB2 Motorsports	Pontiac
37	Jeremy Mayfield	Kranefuss-Haas Racing	Ford
40	Robby Gordon (R)	Team SABCO	Chevrolet
41	Steve Grissom	Larry Hedrick Motorsports	Chevrolet
42	Joe Nemechek	Team SABCO	Chevrolet
43	Bobby Hamilton	Petty Enterprises	Pontiac
44	Kyle Petty	Petty Enterprises	Pontiac
71	Dave Marcis	Marcis Auto Racing	Chevrolet
75	Rick Mast	Butch Mock Motorsports	Ford
77	Robert Pressley	Jasper Motorsports	Ford
78	Gary Bradberry	Triad Motorsports	Ford
81	Kenny Wallace	FILMAR Racing	Ford
88	Dale Jarrett	Robert Yates Racing	Ford
90	Dick Trickle	Donlavey Racing	Ford
94	Bill Elliott	Bill Elliott Racing	Ford
96	David Green (R)	American Equipment Racing	Chevrolet
97	Chad Little	Roush Racing	Pontiac
98	John Andretti	Cale Yarborough Motorsports	Ford
99	Jeff Burton	Roush Racing	Ford

== Qualifying ==
Qualifying was split into two rounds. The first round was held on Friday, September 19, at 3:00 PM EST. Each driver would have one lap to set a time. During the first round, the top 25 drivers in the round would be guaranteed a starting spot in the race. If a driver was not able to guarantee a spot in the first round, they had the option to scrub their time from the first round and try and run a faster lap time in a second round qualifying run, held on Saturday, September 20, at 11:30 AM EST. As with the first round, each driver would have one lap to set a time. Positions 26-38 would be decided on time, and depending on who needed it, the 39th thru either the 42nd, 43rd, or 44th position would be based on provisionals. Four spots are awarded by the use of provisionals based on owner's points. The fifth is awarded to a past champion who has not otherwise qualified for the race. If no past champion needs the provisional, the field would be limited to 42 cars. If a champion needed it, the field would expand to 43 cars. If the race was a companion race with the NASCAR Winston West Series, four spots would be determined by NASCAR Winston Cup Series provisionals, while the final two spots would be given to teams in the Winston West Series, leaving the field at 44 cars.

Mark Martin, driving for Roush Racing, would win the pole, setting a time of 23.679 and an average speed of 152.033 miles per hour (244.673 km/h).

Steve Park was the only driver to fail to qualify.

=== Full qualifying results ===
Pos.	#	Driver	Team	Make	Time	Speed
1	6	Mark Martin	Roush Racing	Ford	23.679	152.033
2	24	Jeff Gordon	Hendrick Motorsports	Chevrolet	23.718	151.783
3	88	Dale Jarrett	Robert Yates Racing	Ford	23.768	151.464
4	90	Dick Trickle	Donlavey Racing	Ford	23.831	151.064
5	18	Bobby Labonte	Joe Gibbs Racing	Pontiac	23.854	150.918
6	98	John Andretti	Cale Yarborough Motorsports	Ford	23.870	150.817
7	42	Joe Nemechek	Team SABCO	Chevrolet	23.886	150.716
8	8	Hut Stricklin	Stavola Brothers Racing	Ford	23.890	150.691
9	75	Rick Mast	Butch Mock Motorsports	Ford	23.954	150.288
10	25	Ricky Craven	Hendrick Motorsports	Chevrolet	23.970	150.188
11	96	David Green (R)	American Equipment Racing	Chevrolet	23.971	150.181
12	97	Chad Little	Roush Racing	Pontiac	23.972	150.175
13	94	Bill Elliott	Bill Elliott Racing	Ford	23.979	150.131
14	33	Ken Schrader	Andy Petree Racing	Chevrolet	23.982	150.113
15	1	Morgan Shepherd	Precision Products Racing	Pontiac	23.993	150.044
16	10	Ricky Rudd	Rudd Performance Motorsports	Ford	24.000	150.000
17	11	Brett Bodine	Brett Bodine Racing	Ford	24.014	149.913
18	23	Jimmy Spencer	Travis Carter Enterprises	Ford	24.023	149.856
19	81	Kenny Wallace	FILMAR Racing	Ford	24.028	149.825
20	21	Michael Waltrip	Wood Brothers Racing	Ford	24.040	149.750
21	4	Sterling Marlin	Morgan–McClure Motorsports	Chevrolet	24.053	149.669
22	2	Rusty Wallace	Penske Racing South	Ford	24.054	149.663
23	44	Kyle Petty	Petty Enterprises	Pontiac	24.060	149.626
24	37	Jeremy Mayfield	Kranefuss-Haas Racing	Ford	24.061	149.620
25	7	Geoff Bodine	Geoff Bodine Racing	Ford	24.065	149.595
26	78	Gary Bradberry	Triad Motorsports	Ford	24.001	149.994
27	22	Ward Burton	Bill Davis Racing	Pontiac	24.070	149.564
28	41	Steve Grissom	Larry Hedrick Motorsports	Chevrolet	24.079	149.508
29	30	Johnny Benson Jr.	Bahari Racing	Pontiac	24.082	149.489
30	31	Mike Skinner (R)	Richard Childress Racing	Chevrolet	24.123	149.235
31	28	Ernie Irvan	Robert Yates Racing	Ford	24.161	149.000
32	77	Robert Pressley	Jasper Motorsports	Ford	24.185	148.853
33	3	Dale Earnhardt	Richard Childress Racing	Chevrolet	24.197	148.779
34	43	Bobby Hamilton	Petty Enterprises	Pontiac	24.198	148.773
35	40	Robby Gordon (R)	Team SABCO	Chevrolet	24.210	148.699
36	5	Terry Labonte	Hendrick Motorsports	Chevrolet	24.230	148.576
37	71	Dave Marcis	Marcis Auto Racing	Chevrolet	24.292	148.197
38	36	Derrike Cope	MB2 Motorsports	Pontiac	24.400	147.541
Provisionals
39	99	Jeff Burton	Roush Racing	Ford	-*	-*
40	16	Ted Musgrave	Roush Racing	Ford	-*	-*
41	17	Darrell Waltrip	Darrell Waltrip Motorsports	Chevrolet	-*	-*
42	29	Jeff Green (R)	Diamond Ridge Motorsports	Chevrolet	-*	-*
Failed to qualify
43	14	Steve Park	Dale Earnhardt, Inc.	Chevrolet	-*	-*
Official qualifying results

== Race results ==
Fin	St	#	Driver	Team	Make	Laps	Led	Status	Pts	Winnings
1	1	6	Mark Martin	Roush Racing	Ford	400	194	running	185	$195,305
2	33	3	Dale Earnhardt	Richard Childress Racing	Chevrolet	400	4	running	175	$63,105
3	23	44	Kyle Petty	Petty Enterprises	Pontiac	400	191	running	170	$40,205
4	5	18	Bobby Labonte	Joe Gibbs Racing	Pontiac	400	0	running	160	$41,465
5	3	88	Dale Jarrett	Robert Yates Racing	Ford	399	0	running	155	$39,845
6	16	10	Ricky Rudd	Rudd Performance Motorsports	Ford	399	0	running	150	$34,440
7	2	24	Jeff Gordon	Hendrick Motorsports	Chevrolet	398	11	running	151	$38,190
8	13	94	Bill Elliott	Bill Elliott Racing	Ford	398	0	running	142	$29,990
9	31	28	Ernie Irvan	Robert Yates Racing	Ford	397	0	running	138	$32,340
10	9	75	Rick Mast	Butch Mock Motorsports	Ford	396	0	running	134	$32,390
11	39	99	Jeff Burton	Roush Racing	Ford	396	0	running	130	$33,190
12	14	33	Ken Schrader	Andy Petree Racing	Chevrolet	396	0	running	127	$27,090
13	34	43	Bobby Hamilton	Petty Enterprises	Pontiac	396	0	running	124	$30,390
14	25	7	Geoff Bodine	Geoff Bodine Racing	Ford	396	0	running	121	$26,390
15	6	98	John Andretti	Cale Yarborough Motorsports	Ford	396	0	running	118	$26,990
16	22	2	Rusty Wallace	Penske Racing South	Ford	395	0	running	115	$31,590
17	8	8	Hut Stricklin	Stavola Brothers Racing	Ford	395	0	running	112	$25,590
18	4	90	Dick Trickle	Donlavey Racing	Ford	395	0	running	109	$18,375
19	30	31	Mike Skinner (R)	Richard Childress Racing	Chevrolet	394	0	running	106	$19,090
20	7	42	Joe Nemechek	Team SABCO	Chevrolet	394	0	running	103	$19,190
21	28	41	Steve Grissom	Larry Hedrick Motorsports	Chevrolet	394	0	running	100	$24,790
22	27	22	Ward Burton	Bill Davis Racing	Pontiac	393	0	running	97	$24,640
23	24	37	Jeremy Mayfield	Kranefuss-Haas Racing	Ford	393	0	running	94	$17,490
24	40	16	Ted Musgrave	Roush Racing	Ford	393	0	running	91	$24,340
25	11	96	David Green (R)	American Equipment Racing	Chevrolet	393	0	running	88	$17,415
26	17	11	Brett Bodine	Brett Bodine Racing	Ford	393	0	running	85	$24,015
27	21	4	Sterling Marlin	Morgan–McClure Motorsports	Chevrolet	393	0	running	82	$29,865
28	29	30	Johnny Benson Jr.	Bahari Racing	Pontiac	392	0	running	79	$23,815
29	12	97	Chad Little	Roush Racing	Pontiac	392	0	running	76	$16,765
30	38	36	Derrike Cope	MB2 Motorsports	Pontiac	392	0	running	73	$16,215
31	15	1	Morgan Shepherd	Precision Products Racing	Pontiac	392	0	running	70	$20,665
32	41	17	Darrell Waltrip	Darrell Waltrip Motorsports	Chevrolet	391	0	running	67	$20,605
33	35	40	Robby Gordon (R)	Team SABCO	Chevrolet	389	0	running	64	$20,555
34	37	71	Dave Marcis	Marcis Auto Racing	Chevrolet	388	0	running	61	$13,505
35	26	78	Gary Bradberry	Triad Motorsports	Ford	384	0	running	58	$13,830
36	18	23	Jimmy Spencer	Travis Carter Enterprises	Ford	384	0	running	55	$20,305
37	36	5	Terry Labonte	Hendrick Motorsports	Chevrolet	382	0	running	52	$34,905
38	19	81	Kenny Wallace	FILMAR Racing	Ford	363	0	running	49	$20,305
39	32	77	Robert Pressley	Jasper Motorsports	Ford	230	0	drivetrain	46	$13,305
40	42	29	Jeff Green (R)	Diamond Ridge Motorsports	Chevrolet	166	0	steering	43	$13,305
41	10	25	Ricky Craven	Hendrick Motorsports	Chevrolet	109	0	engine	40	$21,805
42	20	21	Michael Waltrip	Wood Brothers Racing	Ford	86	0	crash	37	$20,305
Official race results

Previous race: 1997 CMT 300	NASCAR Winston Cup Series; 1997 season	Next race: 1997 Hanes 500
