= 1997 UAW-GM Quality 500 =

28th race of the 1997 NASCAR Winston Cup Series

Race details
- Race 28 of 32 in the 1997 NASCAR Winston Cup Series
- The 1997 UAW-GM Quality 500 program cover, with artwork by NASCAR artist Sam Bass.
- Date: October 5, 1997
- Location: Concord, North Carolina, Charlotte Motor Speedway
- Course: Permanent racing facility
- Course length: 1.5 miles (2.41 km)
- Distance: 334 laps, 501 mi (806.281 km)
- Average speed: 144.323 miles per hour (232.265 km/h)

Pole position
Driver	Geoff Bodine	Geoff Bodine Racing
- Time: 29.307

Most laps led
Driver	Bobby Labonte	Joe Gibbs Racing
- Laps: 141

Winner
No. 88	Dale Jarrett	Robert Yates Racing

Television in the United States
- Network: TBS
- Announcers: Ken Squier, Buddy Baker, Dick Berggren

Radio in the United States
- Radio: Performance Racing Network

The 1997 UAW-GM Quality 500 was the 28th stock car race of the 1997 NASCAR Winston Cup Series and the 38th iteration of the event. The race was held on Sunday, October 5, 1997, in Concord, North Carolina, at Charlotte Motor Speedway, a 1.5 miles (2.4 km) permanent quad-oval. The race took the scheduled 334 laps to complete. In the late stages of the race, Robert Yates Racing driver Dale Jarrett, owing to a fallen part from his car according to Jarrett, would help propel Jarrett to the front to capture his 14th career NASCAR Winston Cup Series victory and his sixth victory of the season. To fill out the top three, Joe Gibbs Racing driver Bobby Labonte and Richard Childress Racing driver Dale Earnhardt would finish second and third, respectively.

== Background ==
The layout of Charlotte Motor Speedway, the venue where the race was held.

Charlotte Motor Speedway is a motorsports complex located in Concord, North Carolina, United States 13 miles from Charlotte, North Carolina. The complex features a 1.5 miles (2.4 km) quad oval track that hosts NASCAR racing including the prestigious Coca-Cola 600 on Memorial Day weekend and the NASCAR All-Star Race. The speedway was built in 1959 by Bruton Smith and is considered the home track for NASCAR with many race teams located in the Charlotte area. The track is owned and operated by Speedway Motorsports Inc. (SMI) with Marcus Smith (son of Bruton Smith) as track president.

=== Entry list ===
- (R) denotes rookie driver.

#	Driver	Team	Make
1	Morgan Shepherd	Precision Products Racing	Pontiac
2	Rusty Wallace	Penske Racing South	Ford
3	Dale Earnhardt	Richard Childress Racing	Chevrolet
4	Sterling Marlin	Morgan–McClure Motorsports	Chevrolet
5	Terry Labonte	Hendrick Motorsports	Chevrolet
6	Mark Martin	Roush Racing	Ford
7	Geoff Bodine	Geoff Bodine Racing	Ford
8	Hut Stricklin	Stavola Brothers Racing	Ford
9	Lake Speed	Melling Racing	Ford
10	Ricky Rudd	Rudd Performance Motorsports	Ford
11	Brett Bodine	Brett Bodine Racing	Ford
12	Jeff Purvis	LAR Motorsports	Chevrolet
14	Steve Park	Dale Earnhardt, Inc.	Chevrolet
15	Greg Sacks	Bud Moore Engineering	Ford
16	Ted Musgrave	Roush Racing	Ford
17	Darrell Waltrip	Darrell Waltrip Motorsports	Chevrolet
18	Bobby Labonte	Joe Gibbs Racing	Pontiac
21	Michael Waltrip	Wood Brothers Racing	Ford
22	Ward Burton	Bill Davis Racing	Pontiac
23	Jimmy Spencer	Haas-Carter Motorsports	Ford
24	Jeff Gordon	Hendrick Motorsports	Chevrolet
25	Ricky Craven	Hendrick Motorsports	Chevrolet
27	Rick Wilson	David Blair Motorsports	Ford
28	Ernie Irvan	Robert Yates Racing	Ford
29	Jeff Green (R)	Diamond Ridge Motorsports	Chevrolet
30	Johnny Benson Jr.	Bahari Racing	Pontiac
31	Mike Skinner (R)	Richard Childress Racing	Chevrolet
33	Ken Schrader	Andy Petree Racing	Chevrolet
35	Todd Bodine	ISM Racing	Pontiac
36	Derrike Cope	MB2 Motorsports	Pontiac
37	Jeremy Mayfield	Kranefuss-Haas Racing	Ford
40	Elliott Sadler	Team SABCO	Chevrolet
41	Steve Grissom	Larry Hedrick Motorsports	Chevrolet
42	Joe Nemechek	Team SABCO	Chevrolet
43	Bobby Hamilton	Petty Enterprises	Pontiac
44	Kyle Petty	Petty Enterprises	Pontiac
46	Wally Dallenbach Jr.	Team SABCO	Chevrolet
71	Dave Marcis	Marcis Auto Racing	Chevrolet
75	Rick Mast	Butch Mock Motorsports	Ford
77	Robert Pressley	Jasper Motorsports	Ford
78	Gary Bradberry	Triad Motorsports	Ford
81	Kenny Wallace	FILMAR Racing	Ford
88	Dale Jarrett	Robert Yates Racing	Ford
90	Dick Trickle	Donlavey Racing	Ford
91	Kevin Lepage	LJ Racing	Chevrolet
94	Bill Elliott	Bill Elliott Racing	Ford
96	David Green (R)	American Equipment Racing	Chevrolet
97	Chad Little	Roush Racing	Pontiac
98	John Andretti	Cale Yarborough Motorsports	Ford
99	Jeff Burton	Roush Racing	Ford

== Qualifying ==
Qualifying was split into two rounds. The first round was held on Wednesday, October 1. Each driver would have one lap to set a time. During the first round, the top 25 drivers in the round would be guaranteed a starting spot in the race. If a driver was not able to guarantee a spot in the first round, they had the option to scrub their time from the first round and try and run a faster lap time in a second round qualifying run, held on Thursday, October 2. As with the first round, each driver would have one lap to set a time. Positions 26-38 would be decided on time, and depending on who needed it, the 39th thru either the 42nd, 43rd, or 44th position would be based on provisionals. Four spots are awarded by the use of provisionals based on owner's points. The fifth is awarded to a past champion who has not otherwise qualified for the race. If no past champion needs the provisional, the field would be limited to 42 cars. If a champion needed it, the field would expand to 43 cars. If the race was a companion race with the NASCAR Winston West Series, four spots would be determined by NASCAR Winston Cup Series provisionals, while the final two spots would be given to teams in the Winston West Series, leaving the field at 44 cars.

Geoff Bodine, driving for Geoff Bodine Racing, would win the pole, setting a time of 29.307 and an average speed of 184.256 miles per hour (296.531 km/h).

Seven drivers failed to qualify: Rick Mast, Greg Sacks, Mike Skinner, Steve Park, Darrell Waltrip, Elliott Sadler, and Dave Marcis.

=== Full qualifying results ===
Pos.	#	Driver	Team	Make	Time	Speed
1	7	Geoff Bodine	Geoff Bodine Racing	Ford	29.307	184.256
2	18	Bobby Labonte	Joe Gibbs Racing	Pontiac	29.389	183.742
3	6	Mark Martin	Roush Racing	Ford	29.400	183.673
4	24	Jeff Gordon	Hendrick Motorsports	Chevrolet	29.447	183.380
5	88	Dale Jarrett	Robert Yates Racing	Ford	29.490	183.113
6	90	Dick Trickle	Donlavey Racing	Ford	29.525	182.896
7	22	Ward Burton	Bill Davis Racing	Pontiac	29.530	182.865
8	12	Jeff Purvis	LAR Motorsports	Chevrolet	29.604	182.408
9	23	Jimmy Spencer	Travis Carter Enterprises	Ford	29.679	181.947
10	1	Morgan Shepherd	Precision Products Racing	Pontiac	29.680	181.941
11	33	Ken Schrader	Andy Petree Racing	Chevrolet	29.705	181.788
12	91	Kevin Lepage	LJ Racing	Chevrolet	29.709	181.763
13	36	Derrike Cope	MB2 Motorsports	Pontiac	29.721	181.690
14	16	Ted Musgrave	Roush Racing	Ford	29.728	181.647
15	30	Johnny Benson Jr.	Bahari Racing	Pontiac	29.756	181.476
16	46	Wally Dallenbach Jr.	Team SABCO	Chevrolet	29.765	181.421
17	41	Steve Grissom	Larry Hedrick Motorsports	Chevrolet	29.770	181.391
18	11	Brett Bodine	Brett Bodine Racing	Ford	29.771	181.385
19	3	Dale Earnhardt	Richard Childress Racing	Chevrolet	29.781	181.324
20	29	Jeff Green (R)	Diamond Ridge Motorsports	Chevrolet	29.800	181.208
21	4	Sterling Marlin	Morgan–McClure Motorsports	Chevrolet	29.807	181.165
22	10	Ricky Rudd	Rudd Performance Motorsports	Ford	29.816	181.111
23	98	John Andretti	Cale Yarborough Motorsports	Ford	29.822	181.074
24	42	Joe Nemechek	Team SABCO	Chevrolet	29.833	181.008
25	2	Rusty Wallace	Penske Racing South	Ford	29.845	180.935
26	81	Kenny Wallace	FILMAR Racing	Ford	29.739	181.580
27	96	David Green (R)	American Equipment Racing	Chevrolet	29.904	180.578
28	77	Robert Pressley	Jasper Motorsports	Ford	29.912	180.530
29	99	Jeff Burton	Roush Racing	Ford	29.914	180.517
30	21	Michael Waltrip	Wood Brothers Racing	Ford	29.924	180.457
31	97	Chad Little	Roush Racing	Pontiac	29.933	180.403
32	9	Lake Speed	Melling Racing	Ford	29.954	180.276
33	94	Bill Elliott	Bill Elliott Racing	Ford	29.955	180.270
34	27	Rick Wilson	David Blair Motorsports	Ford	29.955	180.270
35	28	Ernie Irvan	Robert Yates Racing	Ford	29.960	180.240
36	35	Todd Bodine	ISM Racing	Pontiac	29.982	180.108
37	8	Hut Stricklin	Stavola Brothers Racing	Ford	29.992	180.048
38	78	Gary Bradberry	Triad Motorsports	Ford	29.996	180.024
Provisionals
39	37	Jeremy Mayfield	Kranefuss-Haas Racing	Ford	-*	-*
40	44	Kyle Petty	Petty Enterprises	Pontiac	-*	-*
41	43	Bobby Hamilton	Petty Enterprises	Pontiac	-*	-*
42	25	Ricky Craven	Hendrick Motorsports	Chevrolet	-*	-*
Champion's Provisional
43	5	Terry Labonte	Hendrick Motorsports	Chevrolet	-*	-*
Failed to qualify
44	75	Rick Mast	Butch Mock Motorsports	Ford	-*	-*
45	15	Greg Sacks	Bud Moore Engineering	Ford	-*	-*
46	31	Mike Skinner (R)	Richard Childress Racing	Chevrolet	-*	-*
47	14	Steve Park	Dale Earnhardt, Inc.	Chevrolet	-*	-*
48	17	Darrell Waltrip	Darrell Waltrip Motorsports	Chevrolet	-*	-*
49	40	Elliott Sadler	Team SABCO	Chevrolet	-*	-*
50	71	Dave Marcis	Marcis Auto Racing	Chevrolet	-*	-*
Official qualifying results

== Race results ==
Fin	St	#	Driver	Team	Make	Laps	Led	Status	Pts	Winnings
1	5	88	Dale Jarrett	Robert Yates Racing	Ford	334	85	running	180	$130,000
2	2	18	Bobby Labonte	Joe Gibbs Racing	Pontiac	334	141	running	180	$110,900
3	19	3	Dale Earnhardt	Richard Childress Racing	Chevrolet	334	31	running	170	$85,650
4	3	6	Mark Martin	Roush Racing	Ford	334	54	running	165	$66,050
5	4	24	Jeff Gordon	Hendrick Motorsports	Chevrolet	334	0	running	155	$62,200
6	29	99	Jeff Burton	Roush Racing	Ford	334	14	running	155	$51,700
7	33	94	Bill Elliott	Bill Elliott Racing	Ford	333	0	running	146	$43,700
8	7	22	Ward Burton	Bill Davis Racing	Pontiac	333	0	running	142	$40,600
9	40	44	Kyle Petty	Petty Enterprises	Pontiac	333	0	running	138	$30,700
10	15	30	Johnny Benson Jr.	Bahari Racing	Pontiac	333	2	running	139	$38,025
11	43	5	Terry Labonte	Hendrick Motorsports	Chevrolet	333	0	running	130	$44,900
12	25	2	Rusty Wallace	Penske Racing South	Ford	332	0	running	127	$39,000
13	17	41	Steve Grissom	Larry Hedrick Motorsports	Chevrolet	332	2	running	129	$32,100
14	6	90	Dick Trickle	Donlavey Racing	Ford	332	0	running	121	$24,500
15	11	33	Ken Schrader	Andy Petree Racing	Chevrolet	332	0	running	118	$31,050
16	24	42	Joe Nemechek	Team SABCO	Chevrolet	331	0	running	115	$21,200
17	14	16	Ted Musgrave	Roush Racing	Ford	331	0	running	112	$26,800
18	35	28	Ernie Irvan	Robert Yates Racing	Ford	331	0	running	109	$29,800
19	34	27	Rick Wilson	David Blair Motorsports	Ford	331	0	running	106	$14,435
20	21	4	Sterling Marlin	Morgan–McClure Motorsports	Chevrolet	331	0	running	103	$32,040
21	41	43	Bobby Hamilton	Petty Enterprises	Pontiac	331	0	running	100	$28,960
22	10	1	Morgan Shepherd	Precision Products Racing	Pontiac	331	0	running	97	$24,775
23	31	97	Chad Little	Roush Racing	Pontiac	331	0	running	94	$17,190
24	30	21	Michael Waltrip	Wood Brothers Racing	Ford	330	0	running	91	$23,915
25	42	25	Ricky Craven	Hendrick Motorsports	Chevrolet	330	0	running	88	$23,930
26	36	35	Todd Bodine	ISM Racing	Pontiac	330	0	running	85	$13,160
27	39	37	Jeremy Mayfield	Kranefuss-Haas Racing	Ford	330	0	running	82	$16,355
28	26	81	Kenny Wallace	FILMAR Racing	Ford	330	0	running	79	$23,150
29	20	29	Jeff Green (R)	Diamond Ridge Motorsports	Chevrolet	328	0	running	76	$13,850
30	18	11	Brett Bodine	Brett Bodine Racing	Ford	328	0	running	73	$22,850
31	27	96	David Green (R)	American Equipment Racing	Chevrolet	313	0	running	70	$15,655
32	23	98	John Andretti	Cale Yarborough Motorsports	Ford	300	0	running	67	$22,565
33	13	36	Derrike Cope	MB2 Motorsports	Pontiac	291	0	engine	64	$14,995
34	38	78	Gary Bradberry	Triad Motorsports	Ford	263	0	running	61	$12,470
35	37	8	Hut Stricklin	Stavola Brothers Racing	Ford	247	0	overheating	58	$19,445
36	28	77	Robert Pressley	Jasper Motorsports	Ford	247	0	running	55	$12,425
37	16	46	Wally Dallenbach Jr.	Team SABCO	Chevrolet	244	0	running	52	$12,410
38	32	9	Lake Speed	Melling Racing	Ford	165	0	engine	49	$12,380
39	8	12	Jeff Purvis	LAR Motorsports	Chevrolet	150	1	crash	51	$12,380
40	12	91	Kevin Lepage	LJ Racing	Chevrolet	119	0	crash	43	$12,380
41	22	10	Ricky Rudd	Rudd Performance Motorsports	Ford	102	0	crash	40	$28,880
42	9	23	Jimmy Spencer	Travis Carter Enterprises	Ford	101	0	crash	37	$19,780
43	1	7	Geoff Bodine	Geoff Bodine Racing	Ford	100	4	crash	39	$42,880
Official race results

Previous race: 1997 Hanes 500	NASCAR Winston Cup Series; 1997 season	Next race: 1997 DieHard 500
