= 1997 Exide NASCAR Select Batteries 400 =

24th race of the 1997 NASCAR Winston Cup Series

Race details
- Race 24 of 32 in the 1997 NASCAR Winston Cup Series
- The 1997 Exide NASCAR Select Batteries 400 program cover, featuring Jeff Burton.
- Date: September 6, 1997
- Location: Richmond, Virginia, Richmond International Raceway
- Course: Permanent racing facility
- Course length: 0.75 miles (1.21 km)
- Distance: 400 laps, 300 mi (482.803 km)
- Average speed: 109.047 miles per hour (175.494 km/h)

Pole position
Driver	Bill Elliott	Bill Elliott Racing
- Time: 21.648

Most laps led
Driver	Jeff Burton	Jeff Burton
- Laps: 235

Winner
No. 88	Dale Jarrett	Robert Yates Racing

Television in the United States
- Network: ESPN
- Announcers: Bob Jenkins, Ned Jarrett, Benny Parsons

Radio in the United States
- Radio: Motor Racing Network

The 1997 Exide NASCAR Select Batteries 400 was the 24th stock car race of the 1997 NASCAR Winston Cup Series and the 40th iteration of the event. The race was held on Saturday, September 6, 1997, in Richmond, Virginia, at Richmond International Raceway, a 0.75 miles (1.21 km) D-shaped oval. The race took the scheduled 400 laps to complete. Within the closing laps of the race, Robert Yates Racing driver Dale Jarrett would manage to pass the mainly dominant driver of the day, Roush Racing driver Jeff Burton to take his 13th NASCAR Winston Cup Series victory and his fifth victory of the season. To fill out the podium, Burton and Hendrick Motorsports driver Jeff Gordon would finish second and third, respectively.

== Background ==
The layout of Richmond International Raceway, the venue where the race was at.

Richmond International Raceway (RIR) is a 3/4-mile (1.2 km), D-shaped, asphalt race track located just outside Richmond, Virginia in Henrico County. Known as "America's premier short track".

=== Entry list ===
- (R) denotes rookie driver.

#	Driver	Team	Make
1	Lance Hooper	Precision Products Racing	Pontiac
2	Rusty Wallace	Penske Racing South	Ford
02	Mike Bliss	Ultra Motorsports	Ford
3	Dale Earnhardt	Richard Childress Racing	Chevrolet
4	Sterling Marlin	Morgan–McClure Motorsports	Chevrolet
5	Terry Labonte	Hendrick Motorsports	Chevrolet
6	Mark Martin	Roush Racing	Ford
7	Geoff Bodine	Geoff Bodine Racing	Ford
8	Hut Stricklin	Stavola Brothers Racing	Ford
9	Lake Speed	Melling Racing	Ford
10	Ricky Rudd	Rudd Performance Motorsports	Ford
11	Brett Bodine	Brett Bodine Racing	Ford
16	Ted Musgrave	Roush Racing	Ford
17	Darrell Waltrip	Darrell Waltrip Motorsports	Chevrolet
18	Bobby Labonte	Joe Gibbs Racing	Pontiac
21	Michael Waltrip	Wood Brothers Racing	Ford
22	Ward Burton	Bill Davis Racing	Pontiac
23	Jimmy Spencer	Haas-Carter Motorsports	Ford
24	Jeff Gordon	Hendrick Motorsports	Chevrolet
25	Ricky Craven	Hendrick Motorsports	Chevrolet
27	Kenny Irwin Jr.	David Blair Motorsports	Ford
28	Ernie Irvan	Robert Yates Racing	Ford
29	Jeff Green (R)	Diamond Ridge Motorsports	Chevrolet
30	Johnny Benson Jr.	Bahari Racing	Pontiac
31	Mike Skinner (R)	Richard Childress Racing	Chevrolet
33	Ken Schrader	Andy Petree Racing	Chevrolet
36	Derrike Cope	MB2 Motorsports	Pontiac
37	Jeremy Mayfield	Kranefuss-Haas Racing	Ford
40	Robby Gordon (R)	Team SABCO	Chevrolet
41	Steve Grissom	Larry Hedrick Motorsports	Chevrolet
42	Joe Nemechek	Team SABCO	Chevrolet
43	Bobby Hamilton	Petty Enterprises	Pontiac
44	Kyle Petty	Petty Enterprises	Pontiac
46	Wally Dallenbach Jr.	Team SABCO	Chevrolet
71	Dave Marcis	Marcis Auto Racing	Chevrolet
75	Rick Mast	Butch Mock Motorsports	Ford
77	Morgan Shepherd	Jasper Motorsports	Ford
78	Gary Bradberry	Triad Motorsports	Ford
81	Kenny Wallace	FILMAR Racing	Ford
88	Dale Jarrett	Robert Yates Racing	Ford
90	Dick Trickle	Donlavey Racing	Ford
91	Ron Hornaday Jr.	LJ Racing	Chevrolet
94	Bill Elliott	Bill Elliott Racing	Ford
96	David Green (R)	American Equipment Racing	Chevrolet
97	Chad Little	Roush Racing	Pontiac
98	John Andretti	Cale Yarborough Motorsports	Ford
99	Jeff Burton	Roush Racing	Ford

== Qualifying ==
Qualifying was split into two rounds. The first round was held on Friday, September 5. Each driver would have one lap to set a time. During the first round, the top 25 drivers in the round would be guaranteed a starting spot in the race. If a driver was not able to guarantee a spot in the first round, they had the option to scrub their time from the first round and try and run a faster lap time in a second round qualifying run, held on Saturday, September 6. As with the first round, each driver would have one lap to set a time. Positions 26-38 would be decided on time, and depending on who needed it, the 39th thru either the 42nd, 43rd, or 44th position would be based on provisionals. Four spots are awarded by the use of provisionals based on owner's points. The fifth is awarded to a past champion who has not otherwise qualified for the race. If no past champion needs the provisional, the field would be limited to 42 cars. If a champion needed it, the field would expand to 43 cars. If the race was a companion race with the NASCAR Winston West Series, four spots would be determined by NASCAR Winston Cup Series provisionals, while the final two spots would be given to teams in the Winston West Series, leaving the field at 44 cars.

Bill Elliott, driving for Bill Elliott Racing, would win the pole, setting a time of 21.648 and an average speed of 124.723 miles per hour (200.722 km/h).

=== Full qualifying results ===
Pos.	#	Driver	Team	Make	Time	Speed
1	94	Bill Elliott	Bill Elliott Racing	Ford	21.648	124.723
2	27	Kenny Irwin Jr.	David Blair Motorsports	Ford	21.656	124.677
3	43	Bobby Hamilton	Petty Enterprises	Pontiac	21.671	124.590
4	40	Robby Gordon (R)	Team SABCO	Chevrolet	21.681	124.533
5	81	Kenny Wallace	FILMAR Racing	Ford	21.684	124.516
6	90	Dick Trickle	Donlavey Racing	Ford	21.697	124.441
7	42	Joe Nemechek	Team SABCO	Chevrolet	21.722	124.298
8	96	David Green (R)	American Equipment Racing	Chevrolet	21.734	124.229
9	33	Ken Schrader	Andy Petree Racing	Chevrolet	21.740	124.195
10	24	Jeff Gordon	Hendrick Motorsports	Chevrolet	21.760	124.081
11	99	Jeff Burton	Roush Racing	Ford	21.797	123.870
12	22	Ward Burton	Bill Davis Racing	Pontiac	21.800	123.853
13	6	Mark Martin	Roush Racing	Ford	21.803	123.836
14	2	Rusty Wallace	Penske Racing South	Ford	21.811	123.791
15	8	Hut Stricklin	Stavola Brothers Racing	Ford	21.815	123.768
16	37	Jeremy Mayfield	Kranefuss-Haas Racing	Ford	21.819	123.745
17	44	Kyle Petty	Petty Enterprises	Pontiac	21.828	123.694
18	17	Darrell Waltrip	Darrell Waltrip Motorsports	Chevrolet	21.832	123.672
19	36	Derrike Cope	MB2 Motorsports	Pontiac	21.833	123.666
20	28	Ernie Irvan	Robert Yates Racing	Ford	21.845	123.598
21	25	Ricky Craven	Hendrick Motorsports	Chevrolet	21.846	123.592
22	3	Dale Earnhardt	Richard Childress Racing	Chevrolet	21.850	123.570
23	88	Dale Jarrett	Robert Yates Racing	Ford	21.860	123.513
24	5	Terry Labonte	Hendrick Motorsports	Chevrolet	21.861	123.508
25	29	Jeff Green (R)	Diamond Ridge Motorsports	Chevrolet	21.861	123.508
26	9	Lake Speed	Melling Racing	Ford	21.866	123.479
27	23	Jimmy Spencer	Travis Carter Enterprises	Ford	21.867	123.474
28	46	Wally Dallenbach Jr.	Team SABCO	Chevrolet	21.877	123.417
29	21	Michael Waltrip	Wood Brothers Racing	Ford	21.892	123.333
30	75	Rick Mast	Butch Mock Motorsports	Ford	21.894	123.321
31	7	Geoff Bodine	Geoff Bodine Racing	Ford	21.902	123.276
32	98	John Andretti	Cale Yarborough Motorsports	Ford	21.909	123.237
33	41	Steve Grissom	Larry Hedrick Motorsports	Chevrolet	21.913	123.215
34	18	Bobby Labonte	Joe Gibbs Racing	Pontiac	21.929	123.125
35	10	Ricky Rudd	Rudd Performance Motorsports	Ford	21.953	122.990
36	4	Sterling Marlin	Morgan–McClure Motorsports	Chevrolet	21.969	122.900
37	30	Johnny Benson Jr.	Bahari Racing	Pontiac	21.987	122.800
38	16	Ted Musgrave	Roush Racing	Ford	21.995	122.755
Provisionals
39	11	Brett Bodine	Brett Bodine Racing	Ford	-*	-*
40	31	Mike Skinner (R)	Richard Childress Racing	Chevrolet	-*	-*
41	1	Lance Hooper	Precision Products Racing	Pontiac	-*	-*
42	97	Chad Little	Roush Racing	Pontiac	-*	-*
Failed to qualify
43	71	Dave Marcis	Marcis Auto Racing	Chevrolet	-*	-*
44	02	Mike Bliss	Ultra Motorsports	Ford	-*	-*
45	91	Ron Hornaday Jr.	LJ Racing	Chevrolet	-*	-*
46	78	Gary Bradberry	Triad Motorsports	Ford	-*	-*
47	77	Morgan Shepherd	Jasper Motorsports	Ford	-*	-*
Official qualifying results

*Time not available.

== Race results ==
Fin	St	#	Driver	Team	Make	Laps	Led	Status	Pts	Winnings
1	23	88	Dale Jarrett	Robert Yates Racing	Ford	400	39	running	180	$91,490
2	11	99	Jeff Burton	Roush Racing	Ford	400	235	running	180	$70,240
3	10	24	Jeff Gordon	Hendrick Motorsports	Chevrolet	400	0	running	165	$52,355
4	31	7	Geoff Bodine	Geoff Bodine Racing	Ford	400	0	running	160	$40,005
5	14	2	Rusty Wallace	Penske Racing South	Ford	400	2	running	160	$39,050
6	7	42	Joe Nemechek	Team SABCO	Chevrolet	400	23	running	155	$29,325
7	12	22	Ward Burton	Bill Davis Racing	Pontiac	399	0	running	146	$29,325
8	2	27	Kenny Irwin Jr.	David Blair Motorsports	Ford	399	12	running	147	$17,825
9	38	16	Ted Musgrave	Roush Racing	Ford	399	0	running	138	$30,725
10	16	37	Jeremy Mayfield	Kranefuss-Haas Racing	Ford	399	0	running	134	$24,125
11	27	23	Jimmy Spencer	Travis Carter Enterprises	Ford	398	0	running	130	$27,625
12	33	41	Steve Grissom	Larry Hedrick Motorsports	Chevrolet	398	0	running	127	$27,325
13	37	30	Johnny Benson Jr.	Bahari Racing	Pontiac	398	0	running	124	$27,125
14	9	33	Ken Schrader	Andy Petree Racing	Chevrolet	398	0	running	121	$26,825
15	22	3	Dale Earnhardt	Richard Childress Racing	Chevrolet	398	0	running	118	$33,775
16	19	36	Derrike Cope	MB2 Motorsports	Pontiac	398	0	running	115	$19,520
17	24	5	Terry Labonte	Hendrick Motorsports	Chevrolet	398	0	running	112	$37,320
18	21	25	Ricky Craven	Hendrick Motorsports	Chevrolet	397	0	running	109	$26,270
19	6	90	Dick Trickle	Donlavey Racing	Ford	397	0	running	106	$19,145
20	17	44	Kyle Petty	Petty Enterprises	Pontiac	397	0	running	103	$20,870
21	39	11	Brett Bodine	Brett Bodine Racing	Ford	397	0	running	100	$25,870
22	32	98	John Andretti	Cale Yarborough Motorsports	Ford	397	0	running	97	$25,745
23	20	28	Ernie Irvan	Robert Yates Racing	Ford	397	0	running	94	$30,470
24	5	81	Kenny Wallace	FILMAR Racing	Ford	396	0	running	91	$25,545
25	13	6	Mark Martin	Roush Racing	Ford	396	1	running	93	$30,395
26	30	75	Rick Mast	Butch Mock Motorsports	Ford	396	0	running	85	$25,370
27	15	8	Hut Stricklin	Stavola Brothers Racing	Ford	395	0	running	82	$25,345
28	35	10	Ricky Rudd	Rudd Performance Motorsports	Ford	395	0	running	79	$30,320
29	40	31	Mike Skinner (R)	Richard Childress Racing	Chevrolet	395	0	running	76	$17,800
30	1	94	Bill Elliott	Bill Elliott Racing	Ford	395	43	running	78	$32,290
31	25	29	Jeff Green (R)	Diamond Ridge Motorsports	Chevrolet	394	0	running	70	$15,280
32	18	17	Darrell Waltrip	Darrell Waltrip Motorsports	Chevrolet	394	0	running	67	$22,270
33	41	1	Lance Hooper	Precision Products Racing	Pontiac	394	0	running	64	$22,260
34	34	18	Bobby Labonte	Joe Gibbs Racing	Pontiac	393	0	running	61	$30,225
35	29	21	Michael Waltrip	Wood Brothers Racing	Ford	393	0	running	58	$22,215
36	26	9	Lake Speed	Melling Racing	Ford	393	3	running	60	$15,205
37	8	96	David Green (R)	American Equipment Racing	Chevrolet	392	0	running	52	$15,195
38	3	43	Bobby Hamilton	Petty Enterprises	Pontiac	347	42	rear end	54	$31,685
39	36	4	Sterling Marlin	Morgan–McClure Motorsports	Chevrolet	335	0	running	46	$31,185
40	42	97	Chad Little	Roush Racing	Pontiac	309	0	running	43	$15,185
41	28	46	Wally Dallenbach Jr.	Team SABCO	Chevrolet	224	0	brakes	40	$15,185
42	4	40	Robby Gordon (R)	Team SABCO	Chevrolet	7	0	engine	37	$22,185
Official race results

Previous race: 1997 Mountain Dew Southern 500	NASCAR Winston Cup Series; 1997 season	Next race: 1997 CMT 300
