= 1997 CMT 300 =

25th race of the 1997 NASCAR Winston Cup Series

Race details
- Race 25 of 32 in the 1997 NASCAR Winston Cup Series
- The 1997 CMT 300 program cover.
- Date: September 14, 1997
- Location: Loudon, New Hampshire, New Hampshire International Speedway
- Course: Permanent racing facility
- Course length: 1.058 miles (1.703 km)
- Distance: 300 laps, 317.4 mi (510.805 km)
- Average speed: 100.364 miles per hour (161.520 km/h)

Pole position
Driver	Ken Schrader	Andy Petree Racing
- Time: 29.484

Most laps led
Driver	Jeff Gordon	Hendrick Motorsports
- Laps: 137

Winner
No. 24	Jeff Gordon	Hendrick Motorsports

Television in the United States
- Network: TNN
- Announcers: Eli Gold, Dick Berggren, Buddy Baker

Radio in the United States
- Radio: Motor Racing Network

The 1997 CMT 300 was the 25th stock car race of the 1997 NASCAR Winston Cup Series and the inaugural iteration of the event. The race was held on Sunday, September 14, 1997, in Loudon, New Hampshire, at New Hampshire International Speedway, a 1.058-mile (1.703 km) permanent, oval-shaped, low-banked racetrack. The race took the scheduled 300 laps to complete. At race's end, a fuel-only call by Hendrick Motorsports driver Jeff Gordon late in the race would manage to help him propel to his 29th career NASCAR Winston Cup Series victory and his 10th and final victory of the season. To fill out the top three, Robert Yates Racing driver Ernie Irvan and Petty Enterprises driver Bobby Hamilton would finish second and third, respectively.

== Background ==
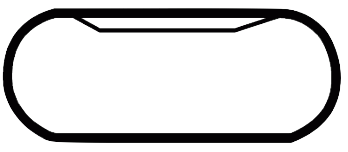
The layout of New Hampshire International Speedway, the venue where the race was held.

New Hampshire International Speedway is a 1.058-mile (1.703 km) oval speedway located in Loudon, New Hampshire which has hosted NASCAR racing annually since the early 1990s, as well as an IndyCar weekend and the oldest motorcycle race in North America, the Loudon Classic. Nicknamed "The Magic Mile", the speedway is often converted into a 1.6-mile (2.6 km) road course, which includes much of the oval. The track was originally the site of Bryar Motorsports Park before being purchased and redeveloped by Bob Bahre. The track is currently one of eight major NASCAR tracks owned and operated by Speedway Motorsports.

=== Entry list ===
- (R) denotes rookie driver.

#	Driver	Team	Make
1	Lance Hooper	Precision Products Racing	Pontiac
2	Rusty Wallace	Penske Racing South	Ford
3	Dale Earnhardt	Richard Childress Racing	Chevrolet
4	Sterling Marlin	Morgan–McClure Motorsports	Chevrolet
5	Terry Labonte	Hendrick Motorsports	Chevrolet
6	Mark Martin	Roush Racing	Ford
7	Geoff Bodine	Geoff Bodine Racing	Ford
8	Hut Stricklin	Stavola Brothers Racing	Ford
9	Lake Speed	Melling Racing	Ford
10	Ricky Rudd	Rudd Performance Motorsports	Ford
11	Brett Bodine	Brett Bodine Racing	Ford
14	Steve Park	Dale Earnhardt, Inc.	Chevrolet
16	Ted Musgrave	Roush Racing	Ford
17	Darrell Waltrip	Darrell Waltrip Motorsports	Chevrolet
18	Bobby Labonte	Joe Gibbs Racing	Pontiac
21	Michael Waltrip	Wood Brothers Racing	Ford
22	Ward Burton	Bill Davis Racing	Pontiac
23	Jimmy Spencer	Haas-Carter Motorsports	Ford
24	Jeff Gordon	Hendrick Motorsports	Chevrolet
25	Ricky Craven	Hendrick Motorsports	Chevrolet
28	Ernie Irvan	Robert Yates Racing	Ford
29	Jeff Green (R)	Diamond Ridge Motorsports	Chevrolet
30	Johnny Benson Jr.	Bahari Racing	Pontiac
31	Mike Skinner (R)	Richard Childress Racing	Chevrolet
33	Ken Schrader	Andy Petree Racing	Chevrolet
36	Derrike Cope	MB2 Motorsports	Pontiac
37	Jeremy Mayfield	Kranefuss-Haas Racing	Ford
40	Robby Gordon (R)	Team SABCO	Chevrolet
41	Steve Grissom	Larry Hedrick Motorsports	Chevrolet
42	Joe Nemechek	Team SABCO	Chevrolet
43	Bobby Hamilton	Petty Enterprises	Pontiac
44	Kyle Petty	Petty Enterprises	Pontiac
46	Wally Dallenbach Jr.	Team SABCO	Chevrolet
71	Dave Marcis	Marcis Auto Racing	Chevrolet
75	Rick Mast	Butch Mock Motorsports	Ford
77	Morgan Shepherd	Jasper Motorsports	Ford
78	Gary Bradberry	Triad Motorsports	Ford
81	Kenny Wallace	FILMAR Racing	Ford
88	Dale Jarrett	Robert Yates Racing	Ford
90	Dick Trickle	Donlavey Racing	Ford
91	Kevin Lepage	LJ Racing	Chevrolet
94	Bill Elliott	Bill Elliott Racing	Ford
96	David Green (R)	American Equipment Racing	Chevrolet
97	Chad Little	Roush Racing	Pontiac
98	John Andretti	Cale Yarborough Motorsports	Ford
99	Jeff Burton	Roush Racing	Ford

== Qualifying ==
Qualifying was split into two rounds. The first round was held on Friday, September 12, at 4:00 PM EST. Each driver would have one lap to set a time. During the first round, the top 25 drivers in the round would be guaranteed a starting spot in the race. If a driver was not able to guarantee a spot in the first round, they had the option to scrub their time from the first round and try and run a faster lap time in a second round qualifying run, held on Saturday, September 13, at 11:00 AM EST. As with the first round, each driver would have one lap to set a time. Positions 26-38 would be decided on time, and depending on who needed it, the 39th thru either the 42nd, 43rd, or 44th position would be based on provisionals. Four spots are awarded by the use of provisionals based on owner's points. The fifth is awarded to a past champion who has not otherwise qualified for the race. If no past champion needs the provisional, the field would be limited to 42 cars. If a champion needed it, the field would expand to 43 cars. If the race was a companion race with the NASCAR Winston West Series, four spots would be determined by NASCAR Winston Cup Series provisionals, while the final two spots would be given to teams in the Winston West Series, leaving the field at 44 cars.

Ken Schrader, driving for Andy Petree Racing, would win the pole, setting a time of 29.484 and an average speed of 129.182 miles per hour (207.898 km/h).

Three drivers would fail to qualify: Lance Hooper, Steve Park, and Kevin Lepage.

=== Full qualifying results ===
Pos.	#	Driver	Team	Make	Time	Speed
1	33	Ken Schrader	Andy Petree Racing	Chevrolet	29.484	129.182
2	43	Bobby Hamilton	Petty Enterprises	Pontiac	29.672	128.363
3	11	Brett Bodine	Brett Bodine Racing	Ford	29.683	128.316
4	31	Mike Skinner (R)	Richard Childress Racing	Chevrolet	29.827	127.696
5	98	John Andretti	Cale Yarborough Motorsports	Ford	29.837	127.654
6	25	Ricky Craven	Hendrick Motorsports	Chevrolet	29.854	127.581
7	75	Rick Mast	Butch Mock Motorsports	Ford	29.871	127.508
8	46	Wally Dallenbach Jr.	Team SABCO	Chevrolet	29.898	127.393
9	9	Lake Speed	Melling Racing	Ford	29.905	127.363
10	94	Bill Elliott	Bill Elliott Racing	Ford	29.921	127.295
11	44	Kyle Petty	Petty Enterprises	Pontiac	29.928	127.265
12	18	Bobby Labonte	Joe Gibbs Racing	Pontiac	29.929	127.261
13	24	Jeff Gordon	Hendrick Motorsports	Chevrolet	29.940	127.214
14	7	Geoff Bodine	Geoff Bodine Racing	Ford	29.941	127.210
15	17	Darrell Waltrip	Darrell Waltrip Motorsports	Chevrolet	29.944	127.197
16	23	Jimmy Spencer	Travis Carter Enterprises	Ford	29.947	127.185
17	6	Mark Martin	Roush Racing	Ford	29.969	127.091
18	96	David Green (R)	American Equipment Racing	Chevrolet	29.974	127.070
19	88	Dale Jarrett	Robert Yates Racing	Ford	29.978	127.053
20	30	Johnny Benson Jr.	Bahari Racing	Pontiac	29.981	127.040
21	16	Ted Musgrave	Roush Racing	Ford	29.984	127.028
22	21	Michael Waltrip	Wood Brothers Racing	Ford	29.990	127.002
23	41	Steve Grissom	Larry Hedrick Motorsports	Chevrolet	30.008	126.926
24	36	Derrike Cope	MB2 Motorsports	Pontiac	30.019	126.880
25	8	Hut Stricklin	Stavola Brothers Racing	Ford	30.026	126.850
26	40	Robby Gordon (R)	Team SABCO	Chevrolet	29.852	127.589
27	37	Jeremy Mayfield	Kranefuss-Haas Racing	Ford	29.887	127.440
28	90	Dick Trickle	Donlavey Racing	Ford	29.888	127.436
29	42	Joe Nemechek	Team SABCO	Chevrolet	29.961	127.125
30	3	Dale Earnhardt	Richard Childress Racing	Chevrolet	29.962	127.121
31	78	Gary Bradberry	Triad Motorsports	Ford	30.032	126.825
32	71	Dave Marcis	Marcis Auto Racing	Chevrolet	30.037	126.804
33	2	Rusty Wallace	Penske Racing South	Ford	30.120	126.454
34	81	Kenny Wallace	FILMAR Racing	Ford	30.135	126.391
35	22	Ward Burton	Bill Davis Racing	Pontiac	30.151	126.324
36	29	Jeff Green (R)	Diamond Ridge Motorsports	Chevrolet	30.234	125.977
37	10	Ricky Rudd	Rudd Performance Motorsports	Ford	30.248	125.919
38	97	Chad Little	Roush Racing	Pontiac	30.290	125.744
Provisionals
39	99	Jeff Burton	Roush Racing	Ford	-*	-*
40	28	Ernie Irvan	Robert Yates Racing	Ford	-*	-*
41	4	Sterling Marlin	Morgan–McClure Motorsports	Chevrolet	-*	-*
42	77	Robert Pressley	Jasper Motorsports	Ford	-*	-*
Champion's Provisional
43	5	Terry Labonte	Hendrick Motorsports	Chevrolet	-*	-*
Failed to qualify
44	1	Lance Hooper	Precision Products Racing	Pontiac	-*	-*
45	14	Steve Park	Dale Earnhardt, Inc.	Chevrolet	-*	-*
46	91	Kevin Lepage	LJ Racing	Chevrolet	-*	-*
Official qualifying results

*Time not available.

== Race results ==
Fin	St	#	Driver	Team	Make	Laps	Led	Status	Pts	Winnings
1	13	24	Jeff Gordon	Hendrick Motorsports	Chevrolet	300	137	running	185	$188,625
2	40	28	Ernie Irvan	Robert Yates Racing	Ford	300	5	running	175	$111,425
3	2	43	Bobby Hamilton	Petty Enterprises	Pontiac	300	62	running	170	$84,925
4	23	41	Steve Grissom	Larry Hedrick Motorsports	Chevrolet	300	0	running	160	$63,225
5	6	25	Ricky Craven	Hendrick Motorsports	Chevrolet	300	91	running	160	$62,425
6	19	88	Dale Jarrett	Robert Yates Racing	Ford	300	0	running	150	$52,125
7	16	23	Jimmy Spencer	Travis Carter Enterprises	Ford	300	1	running	151	$47,725
8	30	3	Dale Earnhardt	Richard Childress Racing	Chevrolet	300	0	running	142	$49,025
9	17	6	Mark Martin	Roush Racing	Ford	300	1	running	143	$47,025
10	25	8	Hut Stricklin	Stavola Brothers Racing	Ford	300	0	running	134	$47,325
11	10	94	Bill Elliott	Bill Elliott Racing	Ford	300	0	running	130	$42,125
12	11	44	Kyle Petty	Petty Enterprises	Pontiac	300	0	running	127	$33,225
13	29	42	Joe Nemechek	Team SABCO	Chevrolet	300	0	running	124	$33,725
14	39	99	Jeff Burton	Roush Racing	Ford	300	0	running	121	$46,025
15	12	18	Bobby Labonte	Joe Gibbs Racing	Pontiac	300	0	running	118	$45,925
16	14	7	Geoff Bodine	Geoff Bodine Racing	Ford	300	0	running	115	$38,825
17	5	98	John Andretti	Cale Yarborough Motorsports	Ford	300	0	running	112	$38,000
18	9	9	Lake Speed	Melling Racing	Ford	300	0	running	109	$30,300
19	20	30	Johnny Benson Jr.	Bahari Racing	Pontiac	300	0	running	106	$37,000
20	7	75	Rick Mast	Butch Mock Motorsports	Ford	300	1	running	108	$36,700
21	33	2	Rusty Wallace	Penske Racing South	Ford	299	0	crash	100	$42,975
22	28	90	Dick Trickle	Donlavey Racing	Ford	299	0	running	97	$29,175
23	35	22	Ward Burton	Bill Davis Racing	Pontiac	299	0	running	94	$25,875
24	26	40	Robby Gordon (R)	Team SABCO	Chevrolet	299	0	running	91	$37,575
25	27	37	Jeremy Mayfield	Kranefuss-Haas Racing	Ford	299	0	running	88	$27,285
26	24	36	Derrike Cope	MB2 Motorsports	Pontiac	299	0	running	85	$27,975
27	34	81	Kenny Wallace	FILMAR Racing	Ford	298	0	running	82	$34,750
28	38	97	Chad Little	Roush Racing	Pontiac	298	0	running	79	$27,050
29	32	71	Dave Marcis	Marcis Auto Racing	Chevrolet	298	0	running	76	$24,350
30	21	16	Ted Musgrave	Roush Racing	Ford	297	0	running	73	$31,150
31	8	46	Wally Dallenbach Jr.	Team SABCO	Chevrolet	297	0	running	70	$23,950
32	15	17	Darrell Waltrip	Darrell Waltrip Motorsports	Chevrolet	297	0	running	67	$30,750
33	3	11	Brett Bodine	Brett Bodine Racing	Ford	295	0	running	64	$32,050
34	31	78	Gary Bradberry	Triad Motorsports	Ford	295	0	running	61	$23,350
35	4	31	Mike Skinner (R)	Richard Childress Racing	Chevrolet	295	0	running	58	$23,150
36	22	21	Michael Waltrip	Wood Brothers Racing	Ford	292	0	crash	55	$29,950
37	1	33	Ken Schrader	Andy Petree Racing	Chevrolet	291	2	running	57	$36,250
38	36	29	Jeff Green (R)	Diamond Ridge Motorsports	Chevrolet	287	0	running	49	$22,400
39	41	4	Sterling Marlin	Morgan–McClure Motorsports	Chevrolet	282	0	running	46	$38,400
40	18	96	David Green (R)	American Equipment Racing	Chevrolet	274	0	running	43	$22,400
41	43	5	Terry Labonte	Hendrick Motorsports	Chevrolet	264	0	crash	40	$44,000
42	37	10	Ricky Rudd	Rudd Performance Motorsports	Ford	233	0	crash	37	$37,400
43	42	77	Robert Pressley	Jasper Motorsports	Ford	185	0	crash	34	$22,400
Official race results

Previous race: 1997 Exide NASCAR Select Batteries 400	NASCAR Winston Cup Series; 1997 season	Next race: 1997 MBNA 400
