= 1997 Mountain Dew Southern 500 =

Auto race held at Darlington Raceway in 1997

Race details
- Race 23 of 32 in the 1997 NASCAR Winston Cup Series season
- 1997 Southern 500 program cover
- Date: August 31, 1997
- Official name: Mountain Dew Southern 500
- Location: Darlington Raceway, Darlington, South Carolina
- Course: Permanent racing facility
- Course length: 1.366 miles (2.198 km)
- Distance: 367 laps, 501.3 mi (806.7 km)
- Weather: Extremely hot with temperatures approaching 91.4 °F (33.0 °C); wind speeds reaching up to 15 miles per hour (24 km/h)
- Average speed: 121.149 miles per hour (194.970 km/h)

Pole position
Driver	Bobby Labonte	Joe Gibbs Racing

Most laps led
Driver	Bill Elliott	Bill Elliott Racing
- Laps: 181

Winner
No. 24	Jeff Gordon	Hendrick Motorsports

Television in the United States
- Network: ESPN
- Announcers: Bob Jenkins, Ned Jarrett, Benny Parsons

The 1997 Mountain Dew Southern 500, the 48th running of the event, was a NASCAR Winston Cup Series race held on August 31, 1997, at Darlington Raceway in Darlington, South Carolina. Bobby Labonte won the pole position and Jeff Gordon won the race for the third time in his career and clinched the Winston Million.

== Background ==
Layout of Darlington Raceway, the track where the race was held.

Darlington Raceway, nicknamed by many NASCAR fans and drivers as "The Lady in Black" or "The Track Too Tough to Tame" and advertised as a "NASCAR Tradition", is a race track built for NASCAR racing located near Darlington, South Carolina. It is of a unique, somewhat egg-shaped design, an oval with the ends of very different configurations, a condition which supposedly arose from the proximity of one end of the track to a minnow pond the owner refused to relocate. This situation makes it very challenging for the crews to set up their cars' handling in a way that will be effective at both ends.

The track is a four-turn 1.366 miles (2.198 km) oval. The track's first two turns are banked at twenty-five degrees, while the final two turns are banked two degrees lower at twenty-three degrees. The front stretch (the location of the finish line) and the back stretch is banked at six degrees. Darlington Raceway can seat up to 60,000 people.

Darlington has something of a legendary quality among drivers and older fans; this is probably due to its long track length relative to other NASCAR speedways of its era and hence the first venue where many of them became cognizant of the truly high speeds that stock cars could achieve on a long track. The track allegedly earned the moniker The Lady in Black because the night before the race the track maintenance crew would cover the entire track with fresh asphalt sealant, in the early years of the speedway, thus making the racing surface dark black. Darlington is also known as "The Track Too Tough to Tame" because drivers can run lap after lap without a problem and then bounce off of the wall the following lap. Racers will frequently explain that they have to race the racetrack, not their competition. Drivers hitting the wall are considered to have received their "Darlington Stripe" thanks to the missing paint on the right side of the car.

== Summary ==
Dave Marcis, Greg Sacks and Morgan Shepherd all failed to qualify. The race had 11 cautions for 67 laps. Ernie Irvan had just gotten a lap back and as he was catching up to the field, the wrecked 12 of Jeff Purvis pulled down in front of Irvan and tore up the 28. It did damage to the cooling system and his pit stall was covered in water after every stop. He would eventually drop out of the race on lap 183 due to engine issues. A very odd instance of the race occurred when all the lead lap cars came in during the caution on lap 295 because of the nasty rain. Dale Jarrett was in the lead since lap 258 and his pit crew was telling him to stay out but for some reason he came in at the last second possible instead of staying out in case the race was called. Jeff Gordon came out in 1st after the pit stops and kept the lead for the last 72 laps that were left.

Dale Earnhardt suffered a blackout during the pace laps and crashed, ending his day. After the car was repaired, Busch Series driver Mike Dillon (the son-in-law of car owner Richard Childress) replaced him in the No. 3 car and got a 30th-place finish, 85 laps behind winner Jeff Gordon.

Several crashes and a brief instance of rain allowed the race to last for four hours and eight minutes. Gordon held off a late charge by Jeff Burton to win his ninth race of the year and the Winston Million by less than 0.2 seconds (his 28th overall). ESPN's Bob Jenkins called the ending thus:

Jeff Burton will make a challenge off the corner, onto the straightaway...but Jeff Gordon wins it!

The only other driver to have accomplished the Winston Million was Bill Elliott, who finished fourth and led the most laps. Rusty Wallace finished 43rd after a crash that collected Kyle Petty, Robby Gordon, and Todd Bodine on lap 5. He ended up with $29,270. The total winners' purse was $1,202,356 ($2,411,441.6 considering inflation). Gordon won $131,330 for winning plus an additional $1,000,000 for winning the Winston Million.

=== Official results ===
Pos	Grid	No.	Driver	Team	Manufacturer	Laps	Points
1	7	24	Jeff Gordon	Hendrick Motorsports	Chevrolet	367	180
2	16	99	Jeff Burton	Roush Racing	Ford	367	175
3	3	88	Dale Jarrett	Robert Yates Racing	Ford	367	170
4	2	94	Bill Elliott	Bill Elliott Racing	Ford	367	170
5	21	10	Ricky Rudd	Rudd Performance Motorsports	Ford	367	155
6	17	5	Terry Labonte	Hendrick Motorsports	Chevrolet	367	150
7	1	18	Bobby Labonte	Joe Gibbs Racing	Pontiac	367	151
8	4	6	Mark Martin	Roush Racing	Ford	367	142
9	14	21	Michael Waltrip	Wood Brothers Racing	Ford	367	143
10	5	33	Ken Schrader	Andy Petree Racing	Chevrolet	366	134
11	37	97	Chad Little	Roush Racing	Pontiac	366	130
12	12	7	Geoff Bodine	Geoff Bodine Racing	Ford	366	127
13	8	90	Dick Trickle	Donlavey Racing	Ford	366	124
14	24	36	Derrike Cope	MB2 Motorsports	Pontiac	365	121
15	11	11	Brett Bodine	Brett Bodine Racing	Ford	365	118
16	19	37	Jeremy Mayfield	Kranefuss-Haas Racing	Ford	365	115
17	6	8	Hut Stricklin	Stavola Brothers Racing	Ford	365	112
18	23	9	Lake Speed	Melling Racing	Ford	365	109
19	18	30	Johnny Benson Jr.	Bahari Racing	Pontiac	365	106
20	40	43	Bobby Hamilton	Petty Enterprises	Pontiac	365	103
21	29	41	Steve Grissom	Larry Hedrick Motorsports	Chevrolet	365	100
22	34	40	Robby Gordon #	Team Sabco	Chevrolet	363	97
23	20	42	Joe Nemechek	Team Sabco	Chevrolet	359	94
24	25	81	Kenny Wallace	FILMAR Racing	Ford	354	91
25	27	78	Gary Bradberry	Wilson-Inman Motorsports	Ford	354	88
26	38	17	Darrell Waltrip	Darrell Waltrip Motorsports	Ford	353	85
27	13	22	Ward Burton	Bill Davis Racing	Pontiac	350	82
28	30	23	Jimmy Spencer	Travis Carter Enterprises	Ford	341	79
29	15	16	Ted Musgrave	Roush Racing	Ford	296	81
30	36	3	Dale Earnhardt^{‡}	Richard Childress Racing	Chevrolet	282	73
31	31	25	Ricky Craven	Hendrick Motorsports	Chevrolet	236	70
32	39	44	Kyle Petty	PE2	Pontiac	202	67
33	10	28	Ernie Irvan	Robert Yates Racing	Ford	183	64
34	28	75	Rick Mast	RahMoc Enterprises	Ford	177	61
35	41	1	Lance Hooper #	Richard Jackson Motorsports	Pontiac	175	58
36	33	31	Mike Skinner #	Richard Childress Racing	Chevrolet	130	55
37	32	98	John Andretti	Cale Yarborough Racing	Ford	117	52
38	22	12	Jeff Purvis	LAR Motorsports	Chevrolet	114	49
39	42	29	Jeff Green #	Diamond Ridge Motorsports	Chevrolet	104	46
40	9	4	Sterling Marlin	Morgan-McClure Motorsports	Chevrolet	102	43
41	26	46	Wally Dallenbach Jr.	Team Sabco	Chevrolet	85	40
42	35	96	Todd Bodine	American Equipment Racing	Chevrolet	5	37
43	43	2	Rusty Wallace	Penske South	Ford	5	34
# Rookie of the Year candidate / ‡ Relief driver Mike Dillon finished race Source:

== Timeline ==
Section reference:

- Start of race: Bobby Labonte started the race with the pole position.
- Lap 3: Bill Elliott took over the lead from Bobby Labonte.
- Lap 7: First caution of the race, ended on lap 11.
- Lap 46: Jeff Burton took over the lead from Bill Elliott.
- Lap 70: Michael Waltrip took over the lead from Jeff Burton.
- Lap 72: Jeff Gordon took over the lead from Michael Waltrip.
- Lap 109: Second caution of the race, ended on lap 114.
- Lap 116: Bill Elliott took over the lead from Jeff Gordon.
- Lap 120: Third caution of the race, ended on lap 125.
- Lap 135: Fourth caution of the race, ended on lap 139.
- Lap 136: Ted Musgrave took over the lead from Bill Elliott.
- Lap 140: Bill Elliott took over the lead from Ted Musgrave.
- Lap 168: Fifth caution of the race, ended on lap 175.
- Lap 180: Sixth caution of the race, ended on lap 186.
- Lap 211: Seventh caution of the race, ended on lap 216.
- Lap 251: Eighth caution of the race, ended on lap 256.
- Lap 258: Dale Jarrett took over the lead from Bill Elliott.
- Lap 274: Ninth caution of the race, ended on lap 278.
- Lap 295: Tenth caution of the race, ended on lap 302.
- Lap 296: Jeff Gordon took over the lead from Dale Jarrett.
- Lap 344: Eleventh caution of the race, ended on lap 367.
- Finish: Jeff Gordon was officially declared the winner.

== Standings after the race ==
Pos	Driver	Points	Differential
1	Jeff Gordon	3437	0
2 ▼	Mark Martin	3412	-25
3	Dale Jarrett	3269	-168
4	Terry Labonte	3180	-257
5	Jeff Burton	3154	-283
6	Dale Earnhardt	2938	-499
7	Bobby Labonte	2911	-526
8 ▲	Bill Elliott	2761	-676
9 ▲	Ricky Rudd	2689	-748
10 ▼	Ted Musgrave	2678	-759

Preceded by 1997 Goody's Headache Powder 500 (Bristol)	NASCAR Winston Cup Series season 1997	Succeeded by 1997 Exide NASCAR Select Batteries 400
