= Darrell Waltrip Motorsports =

Defunct NASCAR team

Darrell Waltrip Motorsports/DarWal Inc.
- Owner: Darrell Waltrip
- Base: Mooresville, North Carolina
- Series: Winston Cup; Busch Series; Craftsman Truck Series
- Race drivers: Darrell Waltrip; David Reutimann; Michael McDowell
- Manufacturer: Chevrolet, Toyota
- Opened: 1972
- Closed: 2007

Career
- Debut: Cup Series: 1972 Winston 500 (Talladega); Busch Series: 1982 Mello Yello 300 (Charlotte); Truck Series: 1995 Winston 500 (Richmond)
- Latest race: Cup Series: 1998 TranSouth Financial 400 (Darlington); Busch Series: 2005 Ford 300 (Homestead–Miami); Truck Series: 2007 Easy Care Vehicle Service Contracts 200 (Atlanta)
- Races competed: Total: 573; Cup Series: 270; Busch Series: 103; Truck Series: 200
- Drivers' Championships: Total: 0 Cup Series: 0 Busch Series: 0 Truck Series: 0
- Race victories: Total: 25; Cup Series: 6 Busch Series: 15; Truck Series: 4
- Pole positions: Total: 19; Cup Series: 5 Busch Series: 4 Truck Series: 10

Darrell Waltrip Motorsports was a NASCAR team owned by three-time Winston Cup champion Darrell Waltrip. It was formed in 1991 when Waltrip resigned from Hendrick Motorsports to start his own team, and was originally named DarWal, Inc..

During the 1970s, Waltrip, like many drivers of the time, formed their own teams for racing, in lower levels, originally DarWal, Inc, was his personal licensing agent and operator for many short-track cars he would race at many circuits on non-Cup weekends or special events, and eventually went to Busch Series racing. In 1991, the racing team moved up to the Cup level, with Hendrick support, but he divested himself of Busch operations at the end of the 1993 season. Sold the Busch team to Hank Parker in 1994.

Waltrip has also run part-time with his team, with his final NASCAR Truck Series race coming at Martinsville Speedway, where he finished 12th.

== NASCAR Winston Cup ==
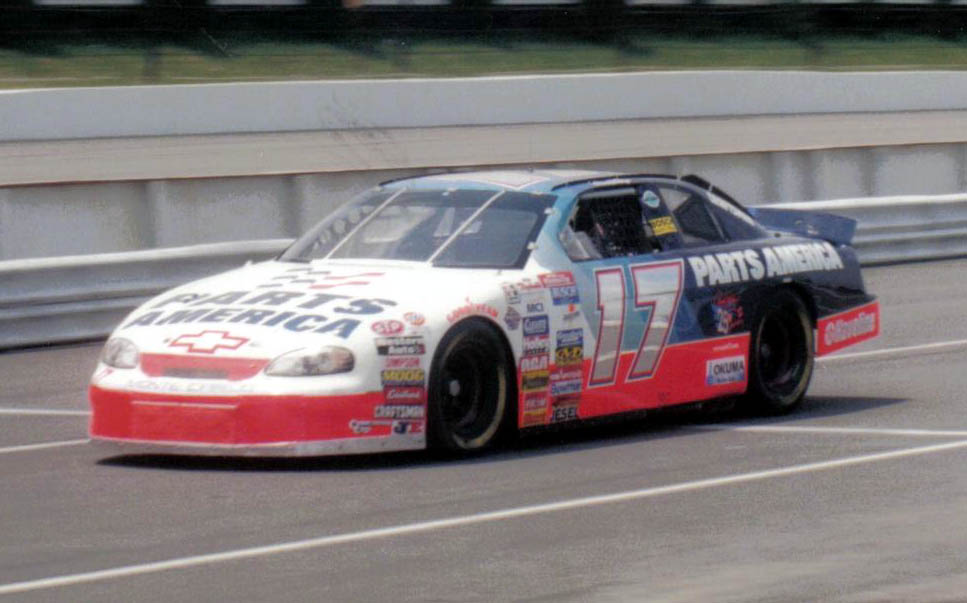
The Darrell Waltrip number 17 in 1997 at Pocono

DWM debuted at the 1991 Daytona 500 as car No. 17 with sponsorship from Western Auto. (The car number and numbering style were a carryover from Waltrip's days as a driver for Hendrick Motorsports.) Waltrip led at one point during the event, but finished 24th following an accident late in the race. Waltrip won five races over the next two years, with his final top-10 points finish coming in 1994. After that, the pressure of being an owner/driver started to crash down on Waltrip, and his performance declined. After Western Auto was renamed to Parts America, they planned on leaving the team, but stayed on for another year before leaving after 1997. That same year, Waltrip failed to qualify for his first race in 23 years since the 1974 Winston 500 at the fall race at Charlotte Motor Speedway. In addition, DWM briefly expanded to two cars, when Rich Bickle finished 34th at that year's Brickyard 400 the No. 26 Kentucky Fried Chicken Chevy also fielded by DWM, as well as Waltrip running special paint schemes to commemorate his 25th year in the sport.

For 1998, Waltrip agreed to terms with concrete company Speedblock to replace Western Auto as his primary sponsor. However, Speedblock never paid Waltrip and he was not getting enough money from secondary sponsors Builders Square and Hechinger to justify keeping his team open. After the spring Darlington race, where he ran an unsponsored car with a paint scheme honoring terminally ill NASCAR legend Tim Flock, Waltrip agreed to sell his team to Tim Beverley and became an injury substitute for Steve Park for Dale Earnhardt, Inc.. Beverley would put the team on hiatus after buying it; after he later purchased the assets of ISM Racing's NASCAR operation that same season, he merged his two acquisitions into one and brought Waltrip back to drive for what was now Tyler Jet Motorsports, in what had originally been ISM Racing's #35 Pontiac sponsored by Tabasco. Waltrip finished out the season in the #35.

In 2007, Darrell Waltrip admitted that he failed as an owner-driver because he thought more like a driver and not like an owner.

=== Car No. 17 results ===
Year	Driver	No.	Make	1	2	3	4	5	6	7	8	9	10	11	12	13	14	15	16	17	18	19	20	21	22	23	24	25	26	27	28	29	30	31	32	33	Owners	Pts
1972	Darrell Waltrip	95	Mercury	RSD	DAY	RCH	ONT	CAR	ATL	BRI	DAR	NWS	MAR	TAL; 38	CLT	DOV	MCH	RSD	TWS	DAY	BRI	TRN	ATL; 8	TAL; 27	MCH	NSV; 3	DAR	RCH	DOV	MAR	NWS	CLT; 6	CAR	TWS				
1973	Darrell Waltrip	95	Mercury	RSD	DAY; 12	RCH	CAR; 6	BRI; 30	ATL; 33	NWS	DAR; 24	MAR	TAL; 31	NSV; 24	CLT; 7	DOV	TWS; 2	RSD	MCH	DAY; 25	BRI	ATL; 31	TAL; 7															
1973	Darrell Waltrip	95	Chevy																					NSV; 24	DAR	RCH	DOV; 20	NWS	MAR	CLT	CAR							
1974	Darrell Waltrip	95	Chevy	RSD	DAY; 7	RCH	CAR; 25	BRI	ATL; 7	DAR; 9	NWS	MAR	TAL; DNQ	NSV; 3	DOV; 20	CLT; 4	RSD	MCH	DAY; 24	BRI	NSV; 3	ATL; 4	POC	TAL; 44	MCH	DAR; 2	RCH	DOV; 35	NWS	MAR	CLT; 3	CAR; 5	ONT; 6					
1975	Darrell Waltrip	17	Chevy	RSD	DAY; 26	RCH; 15	CAR; 21	BRI; 6	ATL; 5	NWS; 7	DAR; 2	MAR; 2	TAL; 4	NSV; 1	DOV; 22	CLT; 4	RSD; 21	MCH; 5	DAY; 4	NSV; 28	POC; 34	TAL	MCH	DAR	DOV	NWS	MAR	CLT	RCH	CAR	BRI	ATL	ONT					
1991	Darrell Waltrip	17	Chevy	DAY; 24	RCH; 7	CAR; 9	ATL; 9	DAR; 25	BRI; 6	NWS; 1	MAR; 3	TAL; 2	CLT; 8	DOV; 7	SON; 25	POC; 1	MCH; 7	DAY; 32	POC; 29	TAL; 15	GLN; 6	MCH; 32	BRI; 8	DAR; 24	RCH; 7	DOV; 19	MAR; 15	NWS; 20	CLT; 9	CAR; 32	PHO; 2	ATL; 10						
1992	Darrell Waltrip	17	Chevy	DAY; 26	CAR; 10	RCH; 5	ATL; 39	DAR; 24	BRI; 25	NWS; 15	MAR; 3	TAL; 29	CLT; 38	DOV; 5*	SON; 8	POC; 13	MCH; 2	DAY; 13	POC; 1	TAL; 23	GLN; 12	MCH; 2	BRI; 1*	DAR; 1	RCH; 3	DOV; 20	MAR; 15	NWS; 9	CLT; 34	CAR; 22	PHO; 3	ATL; 23						
1993	Darrell Waltrip	17	Chevy	DAY; 18	CAR; 30	RCH; 8	ATL; 35	DAR; 16	BRI; 6	NWS; 5	MAR; 4	TAL; 26	SON; 35	CLT; 11	DOV; 24	POC; 30	MCH; 19	DAY; 13	NHA; 19	POC; 10	TAL; 37	GLN; 14	MCH; 13	BRI; 29	DAR; 28	RCH; 7	DOV; 3	MAR; 18	NWS; 11	CLT; 19	CAR; 7	PHO; 7	ATL; 3					
1994	Darrell Waltrip	17	Chevy	DAY; 28	CAR; 23	RCH; 16	ATL; 3	DAR; 26	BRI; 15	NWS; 28	MAR; 4	TAL; 14	SON; 18	CLT; 30	DOV; 6	POC; 30	MCH; 10	DAY; 25	NHA; 23	POC; 28	TAL; 24	IND; 6	GLN; 7	MCH; 9	BRI; 4	DAR; 13	RCH; 10	DOV; 3	MAR; 10	NWS; 13	CLT; 9	CAR; 23	PHO; 10	ATL; 21				
1995	Darrell Waltrip	17	Chevy	DAY; 32	CAR; 38	RCH; 7	ATL; 34	DAR; 21	BRI; 3	NWS; 10	MAR; 4	TAL; 4	SON; 35	CLT; 18	DOV; 20	POC; 42	MCH; 26	DAY; 34	NHA; 17	POC; 36	TAL; 43	IND; 17	GLN; 8	MCH; 15	BRI; 4	DAR; 40	RCH; 22	DOV; 36	MAR; 8	NWS; 14	CLT; 34	CAR; 12	PHO; 38	ATL; 16				
1996	Darrell Waltrip	17	Chevy	DAY; 29	CAR; 16	RCH; 27	ATL; 32	DAR; 34	BRI; 26	NWS; 25	MAR; 16	TAL; 21	SON; 14	CLT; 13	DOV; 39	POC; 30	MCH; 25	DAY; 26	NHA; 37	POC; 40	TAL; 9	IND; 40	GLN; 18	MCH; 22	BRI; 11	DAR; 32	RCH; 22	DOV; 39	MAR; 23	NWS; 27	CLT; 42	CAR; 21	PHO; 10	ATL; 37			29th	2657
1997	Darrell Waltrip	17	Chevy	DAY; 10	CAR; 32	RCH; 16	ATL; 16	DAR; 11	TEX; 43	BRI; 25	MAR; 9	SON; 5	TAL; 32	CLT; 21	DOV; 28	POC; 7	MCH; 24	CAL; 15	DAY; 14	NHA; 33	POC; 26	IND; 14	GLN; 18	MCH; 15	BRI; 42	DAR; 26	RCH; 32	NHA; 32	DOV; 32	MAR; 24	CLT; DNQ	TAL; 37	CAR; 29	PHO; 12	ATL; 40		25th	2961
1998	Darrell Waltrip	17	Chevy	DAY; 33	CAR; 41	LVS; 35	ATL; 40	DAR; 30	BRI	TEX	MAR	TAL	CAL	CLT	DOV	RCH	MCH	POC	SON	NHA	POC	IND	GLN	MCH	BRI	NHA	DAR	RCH	DOV	MAR	CLT	TAL	DAY	PHO	CAR	ATL	50th	278

=== Car No. 26 results ===
Year	Driver	No.	Make	1	2	3	4	5	6	7	8	9	10	11	12	13	14	15	16	17	18	19	20	21	22	23	24	25	26	27	28	29	30	31	32	Owners	Pts
1997	Rich Bickle	26	Chevy	DAY	CAR	RCH	ATL	DAR	TEX	BRI	MAR	SON	TAL	CLT	DOV	POC	MCH	CAL	DAY	NHA	POC	IND; 34	GLN	MCH	BRI	DAR	RCH	NHA	DOV	MAR	CLT	TAL	CAR	PHO	ATL	58th	61

== Craftsman Trucks ==
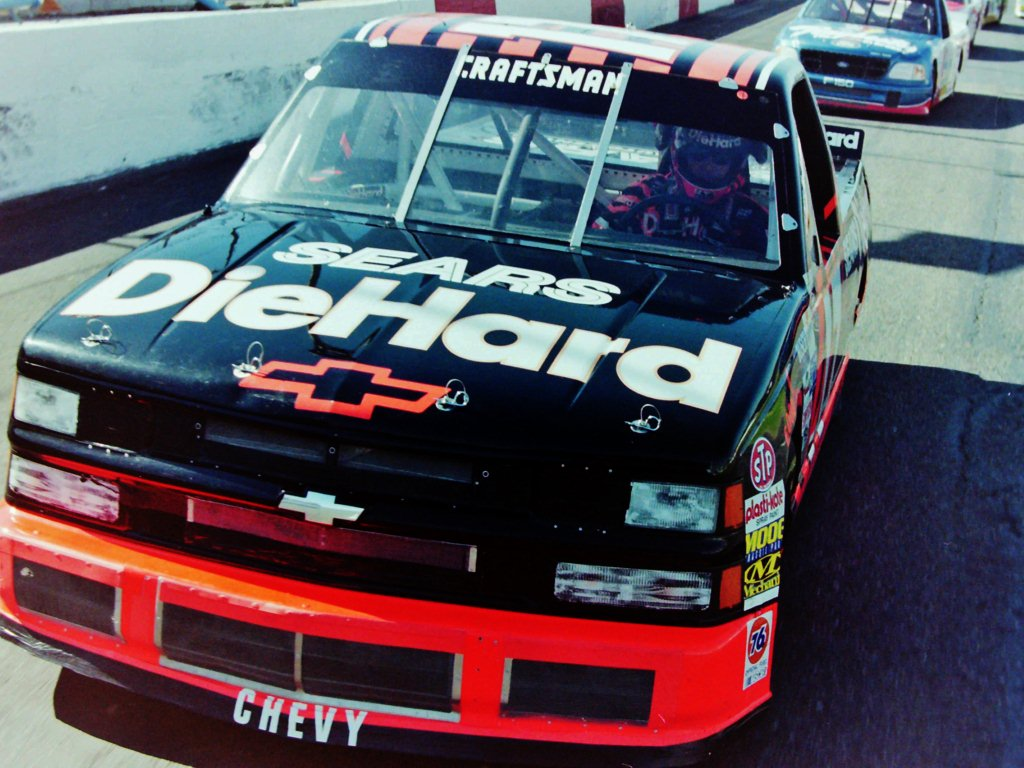
Rich Bickle driving the DarWal Chevrolet in 1997

In 1996, Waltrip began his own team in the Craftsman Truck Series team, hiring Bill Sedgwick to drive his No. 17 Sears/DieHard Chevy. Sedgwick collected eight top tens and finished 14th in points. In 1997, Rich Bickle drove the truck, winning three races and finishing second in points. After the season, Bickle resigned as he had hoped to run with Waltrip in the Cup series in 1998. Waltrip was about to run Phil Parsons in the truck, but after Sears pulled out, he shut the team down until 2003.

In 2003, Waltrip fielded his own truck, this time in partnership with brother Michael and HT Motorsports for a pair of Craftsman Truck races at Martinsville Speedway with the No. 17, the first with Tide (with the Tide with Bleach brand, intentionally reminiscent of his 1989 Daytona 500 win), and the second with the Aaron's promotion of The Three Stooges that ran in various series.

DWM became full-time in 2004 as one of the new works Toyota teams. NTN Bearings sponsored the truck for two seasons, driven by David Reutimann, who won the NASCAR Craftsman Truck Series Rookie of the Year award. The team expanded to a second team in 2005, purchasing the No. 12 truck piloted by Robert Huffman from Innovative Motorsports. Huffman was replaced during the season by Mike Wallace.

Joey Miller attempted to pilot the No. 12 truck full-time in 2006, but was released late in the season and the team finished with various drivers. Reutimann ended the season third in points and moved up to the NEXTEL Cup and Busch Series to drive for Waltrip's brother Michael Waltrip. The team became co-owned by Darrell and Michael Waltrip but kept the Darrell Waltrip Motorsports banner, as noted on the Waltrip Racing Web site.

As part of changes in 2007 with its move into Michael Waltrip's operations banner, the team became a one-truck team and the number was switched to No. 00 to maintain consistency with the rest of the Michael Waltrip Racing banner. A. J. Allmendinger drove the No. 00 for a few races to help in his NASCAR experience, with Aaron's as the sponsor, along with Red Bull for a few races early in the season. Michael Waltrip Racing put developmental drivers Josh Wise and Ken Butler III in the truck, while Justin Labonte also drove a few races for the team. After one last race with Michael McDowell the team sold off its truck equipment in October 2007 to legendary road racing team The Racer's Group.

=== Truck No. 00 results ===
Year	Driver	No.	Make	1	2	3	4	5	6	7	8	9	10	11	12	13	14	15	16	17	18	19	20	21	22	23	24	25	Owners	Pts
2007	A. J. Allmendinger	00	Toyota	DAY; 15	CAL; 25	ATL; 27	MAR; 27		CLT; 2		DOV; 9		MCH; 32						BRI; 21		NHA; 34								23rd	2021
2007	Josh Wise	00	Toyota					KAN; 17				TEX; 13		MLW; 29		KEN; 21		NSH; 19		GTW; 8		LVS; 6	TAL; 23		ATL; 35	TEX	PHO	HOM	23rd	2021
2007	Ken Butler III	00	Toyota							MFD; 36					MEM; 33														23rd	2021
2007	Justin Labonte	00	Toyota														IRP; 27							MAR; 12					23rd	2021

=== Truck No. 5 results ===
Year	Driver	No.	Make	1	2	3	4	5	6	7	8	9	10	11	12	13	14	15	16	17	18	19	20	21	22	23	24	Owners	Pts
1996	Darrell Waltrip	5	Chevy	HOM	PHO	POR	EVG	TUS	CNS	HPT; 11	BRI	NZH	MLW	LVL	I70	IRP	FLM	GLN	NSV	RCH; 9	NHA	MAR; 5	NWS; 10	SON	MMR	PHO	LVS; 20		

=== Truck No. 11 results ===
Year	Driver	No.	Make	1	2	3	4	5	6	7	8	9	10	11	12	13	14	15	16	17	18	19	20	21	22	23	24	25	Owners	Pts
2004	Darrell Waltrip	11	Toyota	DAY	ATL	MAR; 24	MFD	CLT	DOV	TEX	MEM	MLW	KAN	KEN	GTY	MCH	IRP; 28	NSH	BRI	RCH	NHA	LVS	CAL	TEX	MAR; DNQ	PHO	DAR	HOM	58th	134
2005	Darrell Waltrip	11	Toyota	DAY	CAL	ATL	MAR; DNQ	GTY	MFD	CLT	DOV	TEX																	51st	125
2005	Ken Schrader	11	Toyota										MCH; 29	MLW	KAN	KEN	MEM	IRP	NSH	BRI	RCH	NHA	LVS	MAR	ATL	TEX	PHO	HOM	51st	125

=== Truck No. 12 results ===
Year	Driver	No.	Make	1	2	3	4	5	6	7	8	9	10	11	12	13	14	15	16	17	18	19	20	21	22	23	24	25	Owners	Pts
2005	Robert Huffman	12	Toyota	DAY; 19	CAL; 9	ATL; 10	MAR; 19	GTY; 35	MFD; 33	CLT; 21	DOV; 35	TEX; 29	MCH; 19	MLW; 31	KAN; 18	KEN; 30	MEM; 31												22nd	2586
2005	Mike Wallace	12	Toyota															IRP; 26	NSH; 18	BRI; 9	RCH; 6	NHA; 17							22nd	2586
2005	Joey Miller	12	Toyota																				LVS; 15		ATL; 10	TEX; 25	PHO; 15	HOM; 13	22nd	2586
2005	Darrell Waltrip	12	Toyota																					MAR; 13					22nd	2586
2006	Joey Miller	12	Toyota	DAY; 33	CAL; 13	ATL; 36	MAR; 16	GTY; 29	CLT; 22	MFD; 5	DOV; 32	TEX; 30	MCH; 20	MLW; 23	KAN; 30	KEN; 13	MEM; 20	IRP	NSH	BRI; 19	NHA	LVS	TAL	MAR	ATL	TEX	PHO		34th	1541
2006	Michael Waltrip	12	Toyota																									HOM; 17	34th	1541

=== Truck No. 17 results ===
Year	Driver	No.	Make	1	2	3	4	5	6	7	8	9	10	11	12	13	14	15	16	17	18	19	20	21	22	23	24	25	26	Owners	Pts
1995	Darrell Waltrip	17	Chevy	PHO	TUS	SGS	MMR	POR	EVG	I70	LVL	BRI	MLW	CNS	HPT	IRP	FLM	RCH; 8	MAR; 35	NWS; 21	SON	MMR	PHO								
1996	Bill Sedgwick	17	Chevy	HOM; 30	PHO; 18	POR; 4	EVG; 10	TUS; 6	CNS; 7	HPT; 10	BRI; 28	NZH; 28	MLW; 2	LVL; 17	I70; 5	IRP; 30	FLM; 11	GLN; 14	NSV; 23	RCH; 21	NHA; 10	MAR; 34	NWS; 17	SON; 20	MMR; 29	PHO; 23					
1996	Ken Schrader	17	Chevy																								LVS; 8				
1997	Rich Bickle	17	Chevy	WDW; 3	TUS; 2	HOM; 11	PHO; 5	POR; 1*	EVG; 1*	I70; 4	NHA; 20	TEX; 21	BRI; 2	NZH; 4	MLW; 3	LVL; 5	CNS; 5	HPT; 23	IRP; 10	FLM; 3	NSV; 6	GLN; 16	RCH; 4	MAR; 1*	SON; 12	MMR; 5	CAL; 26	PHO; 18	LVS; 16	2nd	3737
2004	David Reutimann	17	Toyota	DAY; 9	ATL; 3	MAR; 8	MFD; 14	CLT; 36	DOV; 17	TEX; 3	MEM; 17	MLW; 32	KAN; 29	KEN; 9	GTW; 9	MCH; 24	IRP; 17	NSH; 9	BRI; 11	RCH; 30	NHA; 5	LVS; 17	CAL; 6	TEX; 30	MAR; 27	PHO; 21	DAR; 28	HOM; 4		15th	2904
2005	David Reutimann	17	Toyota	DAY; 12	CAL; 13	ATL; 24	MAR; 23	GTY; 24	MFD; 21	CLT; 17	DOV; 5	TEX; 10	MCH; 8	MLW; 23	KAN; 3	KEN; 3	MEM; 2	IRP; 11	NSH; 1	BRI; 29	RCH; 17	NHA; 33	LVS; 12	MAR; 34	ATL; 33	TEX; 5	PHO; 7	HOM; 36		14th	2979
2006	David Reutimann	17	Toyota	DAY; 9	CAL; 4	ATL; 5	MAR; 15	GTY; 3	CLT; 6	MFD; 9	DOV; 5	TEX; 4	MCH; 15	MLW; 5	KAN; 10	KEN; 12	MEM; 7	IRP; 34	NSH; 6	BRI; 10	NHA; 12	LVS; 6	TAL; 6	MAR; 18	ATL; 4	TEX; 7	PHO; 8	HOM; 8		4th	3530
2007	Michael McDowell	17	Toyota	DAY	CAL	ATL	MAR	KAN	LOW	MFD	DOV	TEX	MCH	MLW	MEM	KEN	IRP	NSH	BRI	GTW	NHA	LVS	TAL	MAR; 30	ATL	TEX	PHO	HOM		N/A	-

== See also ==
- Ginn Racing
- Michael Waltrip Racing
