= Bill Elliott Racing =

Former American stock car racing team

- Owners: Bill Elliott; Charles Hardy; Dan Marino
- Base: Mooresville, North Carolina
- Series: Cup Series, Busch Series, Craftsman Truck Series
- Race drivers: Bill Elliott; Matt Kenseth; Jerry Nadeau
- Manufacturer: Ford
- Opened: 1995
- Closed: 2004

Career
- Debut: Cup Series: 1995 Daytona 500 (Daytona); Busch Series: 1984 Miller Time 300 (Charlotte); Truck Series: 1996 Florida Dodge Dealers 400 (Homestead)
- Latest race: Cup Series: 2004 Bass Pro Shops MBNA 500 (Atlanta); Busch Series: 1997 Kenwood Home & Car Audio 300 (Fontana); Truck Series: 1997 Carquest Auto Parts 420K (Las Vegas)
- Races competed: Total: 272; Cup Series: 230; Busch Series:33; Truck Series: 9
- Drivers' Championships: Total: 0 Cup Series: 0 Busch Series: 0 Truck Series: 0
- Race victories: Total: 0 Cup Series: 0 Busch Series: 0 Truck Series: 0
- Pole positions: Total: 3 Cup Series: 3 Busch Series: 0 Truck Series: 0

Bill Elliott Racing (formerly known as Charles Hardy Racing, Elliott-Hardy Racing, and Elliott-Marino Racing) was a NASCAR Winston Cup, Busch and Craftsman Truck Series team. It was owned and operated by 1988 NASCAR champion Bill Elliott from 1995 until 2000, when it was sold to Evernham Motorsports, although it was shortly reopened for three Cup Series races in 2004. The team's primary car was the No. 94 McDonald's Ford Winston Cup car driven by its owner, but also fielded various other cars.

== Winston Cup ==
=== Car No. 13 history ===
Elliott's operation went multi-car full-time in 1998, teaming up with Dan Marino and renaming the team to Elliott-Marino Racing to field the No. 13 FirstPlus Financial Ford. Rookie Jerry Nadeau raced the car for the first half of the year, before he was released and replaced by Wally Dallenbach Jr., Dennis Setzer, Tom Hubert and Ted Musgrave.

In February 1999, the partnership between Elliott and Marino was dissolved and the No. 13 closed as a result. The No. 13 came back for the Daytona 500 with Dick Trickle, but didn't qualify.

==== Car No. 13 results ====
NASCAR Winston Cup Series results
Year	Team	No.	Make	1	2	3	4	5	6	7	8	9	10	11	12	13	14	15	16	17	18	19	20	21	22	23	24	25	26	27	28	29	30	31	32	33	34	NWCC	Pts
1998	Jerry Nadeau	13	Ford	DAY; 21	CAR; 28	LVS; DNQ	ATL; 32	DAR; 31	BRI; 37	TEX; DNQ	MAR; 27	TAL; 37	CAL; 26	CLT; 40		RCH; 38	MCH; 35	POC; 21	SON; 43	NHA; 27																		38th	2326
1998	Dennis Setzer	13	Ford												DOV; DNQ									MCH; 35	BRI; 39	NHA; 24	DAR; 29	RCH; 29		MAR; 38								38th	2326
1998	Wally Dallenbach Jr.	13	Ford																		POC; 25	IND; 40																38th	2326
1998	Tom Hubert	13	Ford																				GLN; 36															38th	2326
1998	Ted Musgrave	13	Ford																										DOV; 26		CLT; 27	TAL; 11	DAY; 34	PHO; 5	CAR; 19	ATL; 19		38th	2326
1999	Dick Trickle	13	Ford	DAY; DNQ	CAR	LVS	ATL	DAR	TEX	BRI	MAR	TAL	CAL	RCH	CLT	DOV	MCH	POC	SON	DAY	NHA	POC	IND	GLN	MCH	BRI	DAR	RCH	NHA	DOV	MAR	CLT	TAL	CAR	PHO	HOM	ATL	N/A	-

=== Car No. 89 history ===
The 89 R&D car began as the No. 91 with Ron Barfield Jr. for the 1996 Brickyard 400. Barfield Jr. returned to the team, now the No. 92, for the 1997 Brickyard 400. A year later, the team was renumbered to the No. 89; driven by Dennis Setzer, it competed at the DieHard 500.

==== Car No. 89 results ====
NASCAR Winston Cup Series results
Year	Team	No.	Make	1	2	3	4	5	6	7	8	9	10	11	12	13	14	15	16	17	18	19	20	21	22	23	24	25	26	27	28	29	30	31	32	33	NWCC	Pts
1996	Ron Barfield Jr.	91	Ford	DAY	CAR	RCH	ATL	DAR	BRI	NWS	MAR	TAL	SON	CLT	DOV	POC	MCH	DAY	NHA	POC	TAL	IND; DNQ	GLN	MCH	BRI	DAR	RCH	DOV	MAR	NWS	CLT	CAR	PHO	ATL			N/A	-
1997	Ron Barfield Jr.	92	Ford	DAY	CAR	RCH	ATL	DAR	TEX	BRI	MAR	SON	TAL	CLT	DOV	POC	MCH	CAL	DAY	NHA	POC	IND; 22	GLN	MCH	BRI	DAR	RCH	NHA	DOV	MAR	CLT	TAL	CAR	PHO	ATL		54th	97
1998	Dennis Setzer	89	Ford	DAY	CAR	LVS	ATL	DAR	BRI	TEX	MAR	TAL; 19	CAL	CLT	DOV	RCH	MCH	POC	SON	NHA	POC	IND	GLN	MCH	BRI	NHA	DAR	RCH	DOV	MAR	CLT	TAL	DAY	PHO	CAR	ATL	56th	106

=== Car No. 94 history ===
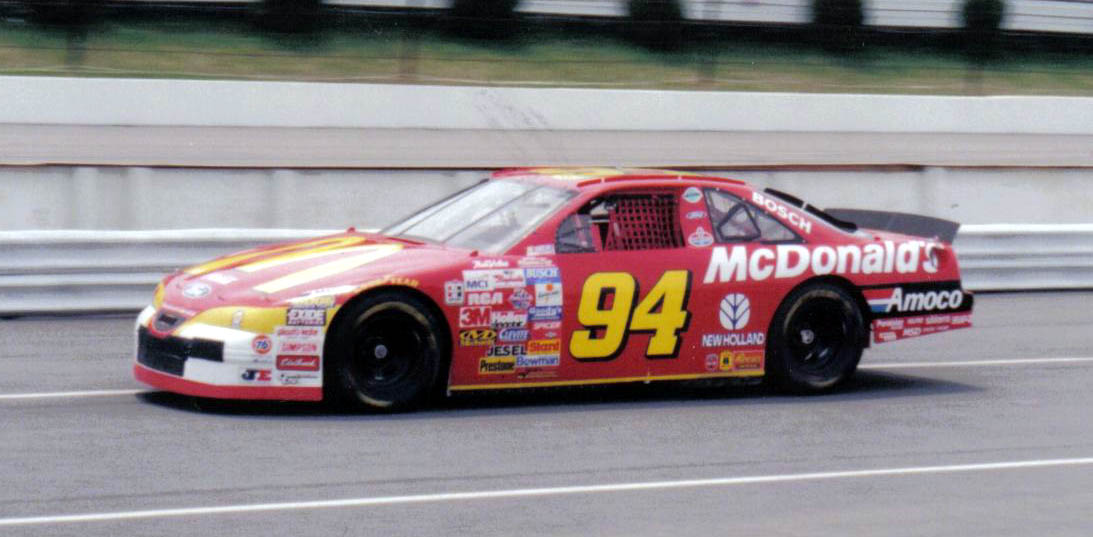
The #94 car driven by Elliott in 1997

The team was originally owned by Charles Hardy and ran part-time with various drivers under the Charles Hardy Racing name with sponsorship from Buss Fuses. Kenny Wallace made the first start for the No. 44 at Talladega Superspeedway, finishing in the ninth position. Jimmy Hensley and Bobby Hillin Jr. ran the car later in the season, but neither finished in the top-ten. Wanting to own his own team, Elliott partnered with Hardy for the 1995 season to form Elliott-Hardy Racing. The new team premiered at the 1995 Daytona 500 as the No. 94 Ford with McDonald's sponsoring. Elliott's first year as an owner/driver was marked with eleven top-tens, two poles, and an eighth-place finish in the points. After a horrific crash in 1996 at Talladega Superspeedway, Elliott missed several races to recover from his injuries and was replaced by Dorsey Schroeder, Todd Bodine, Tommy Kendall, and Bobby Hillin Jr. In July 1996, the partnership between Elliott and Hardy was dissolved, the team being renamed Bill Elliott Racing.

Returning full-time in 1997, Elliott had fourteen top tens and another eighth-place finish in points. His team also expanded to a multi-car operation that year when Ron Barfield drove the No. 92 New Holland Ford to a twenty-second-place finish at the Brickyard 400. Elliott's operation went multi-car full-time in 1998, teaming up with Dan Marino the team being renamed Elliott-Marino Racing. The year was marked with sadness when Elliott had to miss the fall Dover race to attend the funeral of his father. In his place was Matt Kenseth, who finished sixth in his debut Cup race.

After a disappointing 1999 season which saw his multi-car operation dissolve back into No. 94, Elliott announced in early 2000 he was selling his equipment to championship-winning crew chief Ray Evernham to become part of Dodge's return to NASCAR. The team would also switch to No. 9.

==== Car No. 94 results ====
NASCAR Nextel Cup Series results
Year	Team	No.	Make	1	2	3	4	5	6	7	8	9	10	11	12	13	14	15	16	17	18	19	20	21	22	23	24	25	26	27	28	29	30	31	32	33	34	35	36	NNCC	Pts
1994	Bobby Hillin Jr.	44	Ford	DAY	CAR	RCH	ATL	DAR	BRI	NWS	MAR	TAL	SON	CLT; DNQ	DOV	POC	MCH; 14	DAY	NHA	POC		IND; 21	GLN	MCH; 40	BRI	DAR	RCH	DOV	MAR	NWS	CLT; 15	CAR	PHO								
1994	Kenny Wallace	44	Ford																		TAL; 9																				
1994	Jimmy Hensley	44	Ford																															ATL; 12							
1995	Bill Elliott	94	Ford	DAY; 23	CAR; 11	RCH; 16	ATL; 26	DAR; 17	BRI; 14	NWS; 28	MAR; 12	TAL; 6	SON; 19	CLT; 39	DOV; 15	POC; 6	MCH; 14	DAY; 10	NHA; 18	POC; 5	TAL; 5	IND; 4^{*}	GLN; 11	MCH; 9	BRI; 23	DAR; 41	RCH; 14	DOV; 18	MAR; 6	NWS; 10	CLT; 20	CAR; 10	PHO; 14	ATL; 4							
1996	Bill Elliott	94	Ford	DAY; 8	CAR; 15	RCH; 10	ATL; 10	DAR; 13	BRI; 28	NWS; 21	MAR; 13	TAL; 41						DAY; 37	NHA; 14	POC; 21	TAL; 13	IND; 10		MCH; 14	BRI; INQ^{‡}	DAR; 9	RCH; 16	DOV; 28	MAR; 18	NWS; 21	CLT; 10	CAR; 32	PHO; 21	ATL; 20						17th	3347
1996	Tommy Kendall	94	Ford										SON; 28																											17th	3347
1996	Todd Bodine	94	Ford											CLT; 36	DOV; 15	POC; 10	MCH; 20																							17th	3347
1996	Ron Barfield Jr.	94	Ford														MCH; QL^{†}																							17th	3347
1996	Dorsey Schroeder	94	Ford																				GLN; 13																	17th	3347
1996	Bobby Hillin Jr.	94	Ford																						BRI; 22															17th	3347
1997	Bill Elliott	94	Ford	DAY; 4	CAR; 22	RCH; 15	ATL; 38	DAR; 16	TEX; 11	BRI; 7	MAR; 37	SON; 32	TAL; 18	CLT; 4	DOV; 8	POC; 32	MCH; 2	CAL; 32	DAY; 33	NHA; 6	POC; 10	IND; 8	GLN; 7	MCH; 7	BRI; 16	DAR; 4^{*}	RCH; 30	NHA; 11	DOV; 8	MAR; 5	CLT; 7	TAL; 13	CAR; 12	PHO; 15	ATL; 36					8th	3836
1998	Bill Elliott	94	Ford	DAY; 10	CAR; 6	LVS; 9	ATL; 11	DAR; 15	BRI; 15	TEX; 13	MAR; 12	TAL; 39	CAL; 43	CLT; 14	DOV; 13	RCH; 25	MCH; 6	POC; 37	SON; 12	NHA; 26	POC; 36	IND; 12	GLN; 27	MCH; 40	BRI; 19	NHA; 37	DAR; 11	RCH; 40		MAR; 7	CLT; 11	TAL; 19	DAY; 15	PHO; 38	CAR; 12	ATL; 26				16th	3455
1998	Matt Kenseth	94	Ford																										DOV; 6											16th	3455
1999	Bill Elliott	94	Ford	DAY; 27	CAR; 15	LVS; 37	ATL; 15	DAR; 14	TEX; 21	BRI; 25	MAR; 30	TAL; 10	CAL; 19	RCH; 12	CLT; 14	DOV; 12	MCH; 41	POC; 32	SON; 13	DAY; 23	NHA; 5	POC; 39	IND; 23	GLN; 28	MCH; 19	BRI; 36	DAR; 11	RCH; 36	NHA; 19	DOV; 33	MAR; 20	CLT; 11	TAL; 20	CAR; 33	PHO; 35	HOM; 24	ATL; 22			21st	3246
2000	Bill Elliott	94	Ford	DAY; 3	CAR; 25	LVS; 4	ATL; 10	DAR; 19	BRI; 36	TEX; 30	MAR; 8	TAL; 15	CAL; 19	RCH; 9	CLT; 43	DOV; 12	MCH; 8	POC; 38	SON; 35	DAY; 38	NHA; 24	POC; 32	IND; 3	GLN; 13	MCH; 38			RCH; 12	NHA; 37	DOV; 19	MAR; 15	CLT; 34	TAL; 24	CAR; 16	PHO; 26	HOM; 22	ATL; 11			18th	3410
2000	David Green	94	Ford																							BRI; 36	DAR; 25													18th	3410
2004	Bill Elliott	98	Dodge	DAY	CAR	LVS	ATL	DAR	BRI	TEX	MAR	TAL	CAL	RCH	CLT	DOV	POC	MCH	SON	DAY; 18	CHI	NHA	POC	IND	GLN	MCH	BRI	CAL; 25	RCH	NHA	DOV	TAL	KAN	CLT	MAR	ATL; 22	PHO	DAR	HOM	67th	109
^{†} - Qualified for Todd Bodine ^{‡} – Qualified but replaced by Bobby Hillin Jr.

== Busch Series ==
Elliott made his first start as a Busch Series team owner in 1988, driving both races at Charlotte in his No. 9 Ford, his best finish being a seventh. Three years later, he drove two late-season races in the No. 84, finishing in the top-ten both times. His next ownership run would come in 1993, when he fielded the No. 94 in a pair of races for his nephew Casey, who had a best finish of 20th.

In 1996, Elliott's protégé Ron Barfield ran six races in Elliott's No. 94 New Holland Ford, garnering a best finish of 11th at Charlotte. He ran times the following season and had two ninth-place runs. Elliott's last race as a Busch owner came in 1998, when Jeff Fuller finished fifteenth in the No. 94 Chevrolet at the Jiffy Lube Miami 300.

== Craftsman Truck Series ==
Elliott began fielding Truck entries in 1996 with the No. 94 Super 8 Motels Ford for Barfield. He had three top-tens in his first four starts, but only made a limited schedule of seven starts. He ran just one race in 1997, an eighth-place run at Walt Disney World Speedway. Late in the season, Elliott made one start at Las Vegas Motor Speedway with Team ASE Racing sponsoring, but he finished 31st after suffering engine problems.
