= List of NASCAR race wins by Jeff Gordon =

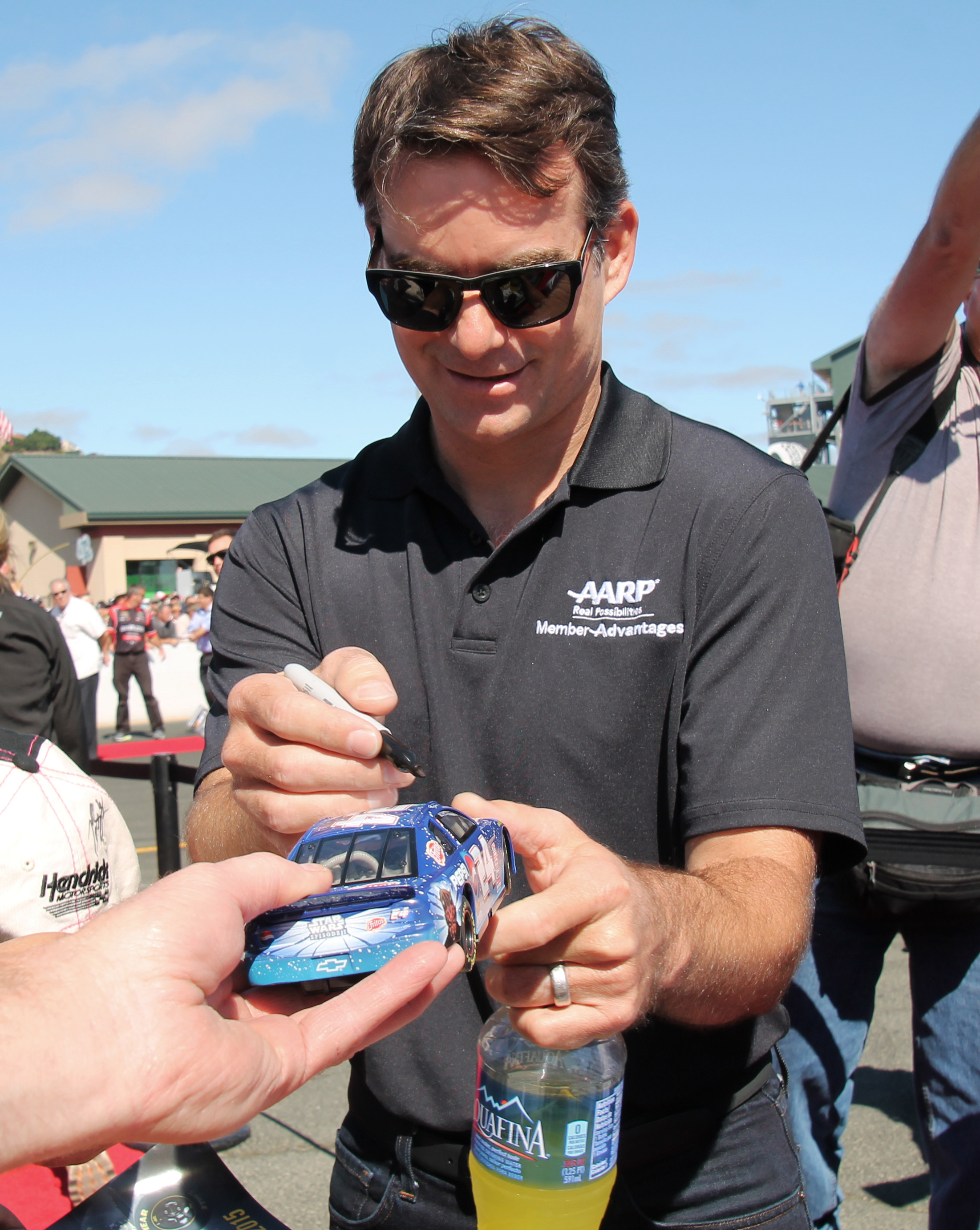
Gordon in 2015

Jeff Gordon is an American racing driver who drove in the NASCAR Cup Series full-time from 1993 to 2015, winning 93 Cup Series races and four Cup championships. Gordon made his stock car debut in the NASCAR Busch Series on October 20, 1990, at North Carolina Motor Speedway for Hugh Connerty, crashing out on lap 23 and ending up with a 39th-place finish. The following year, Gordon began racing in the Busch Series full-time, driving for Bill Davis Racing. In his first year as a Busch driver he won Rookie of the Year. In 1992, Gordon set a NASCAR record by capturing 11 poles in a single Busch Series season. Later in the year, Rick Hendrick watched Gordon race in a Busch Series event at Atlanta Motor Speedway, and Gordon joined Hendrick Motorsports two days later. Gordon made his Winston Cup debut in the season-ending race, the Hooters 500 at Atlanta, finishing 31st after a crash.

During Gordon's career with Hendrick, he won his first race in 1994 at Charlotte Motor Speedway in the Coca-Cola 600, and later became a four-time Cup Series champion. He won his first title the following year in the 1995 season, and went on to win it in 1997, 1998, and 2001. He also won the Daytona 500 three times in 1997, 1999, and 2005. As of 2017, he ranks third on the all-time Cup wins list with 93, the most in NASCAR's modern era (1972–present). Gordon's 81 pole positions is also third all-time; Gordon won at least one pole in 23 consecutive seasons, a NASCAR record. He was also the active "iron man" leader for consecutive races participated in, with 797 through his retirement at the end of the 2015 season.

Over the course of his racing career, Gordon won a total of 98 NASCAR races, 93 of which were in the Cup Series. He also won five races in the Busch Series. His final NASCAR victory came at Martinsville Speedway in 2015 in the Goody's Headache Relief Shot 500. Although he returned on a part-time basis in 2016 as a substitute driver for Dale Earnhardt Jr., this did not result in any further victories; his best result in his return was a sixth-place finish at Martinsville.

== NASCAR ==
=== Winston/Nextel/Sprint Cup Series ===
In the NASCAR Cup Series, which was sponsored by Winston, Nextel, and Sprint during Gordon's career, Gordon, the 1993 Rookie of the Year and four-time series champion, won 93 races. Throughout his career, he won at 24 of the 25 tracks at which he competed, leaving Kentucky Speedway the only track where he failed to win. As of the end of the 2019 Monster Energy NASCAR Cup Series season, Gordon's 93 wins rank third all-time behind Richard Petty (200) and David Pearson (105).

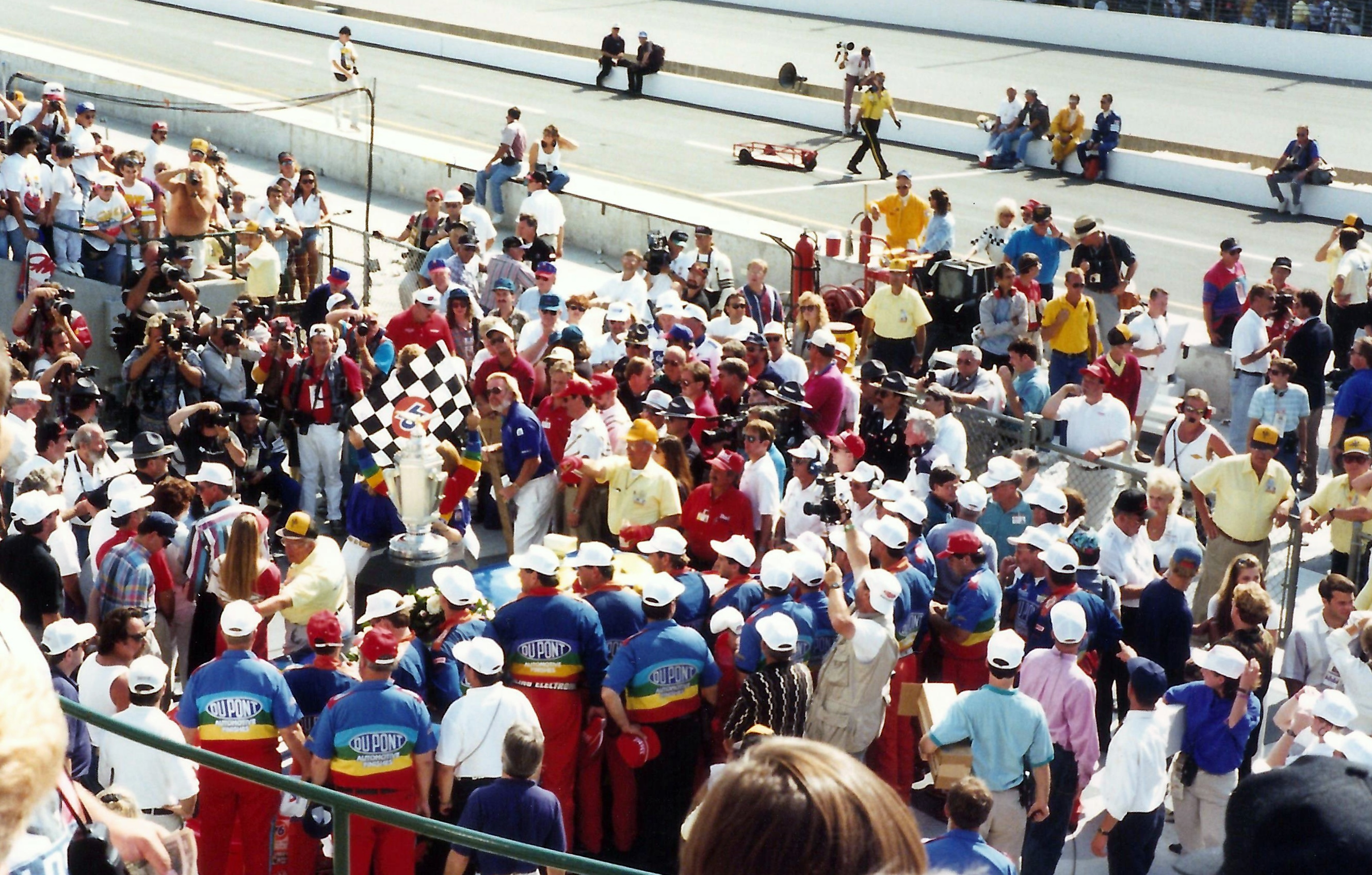
Gordon in Victory Lane with his team at the 1994 Brickyard 400

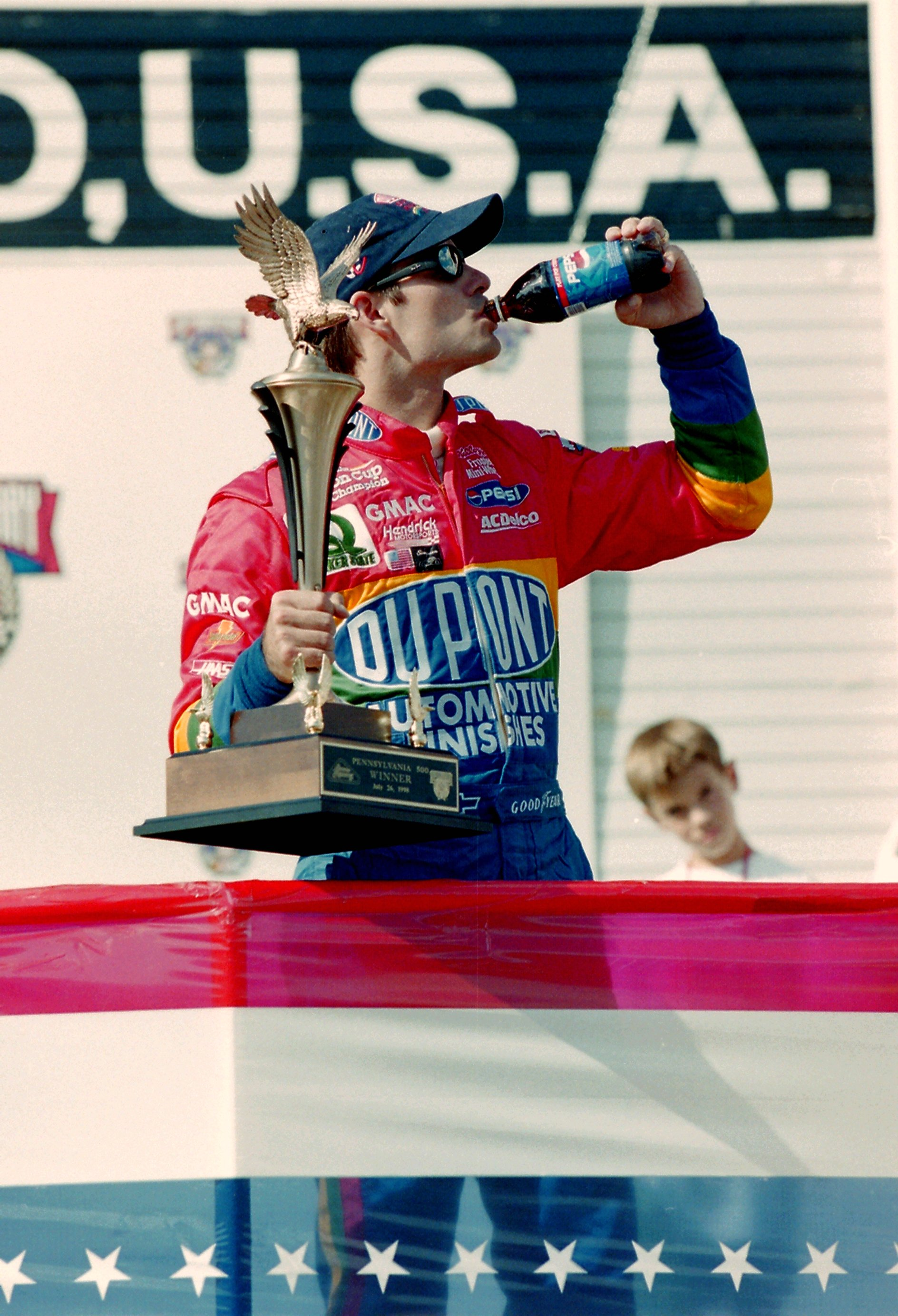
Gordon holding the trophy after his victory at the 1998 Pennsylvania 500

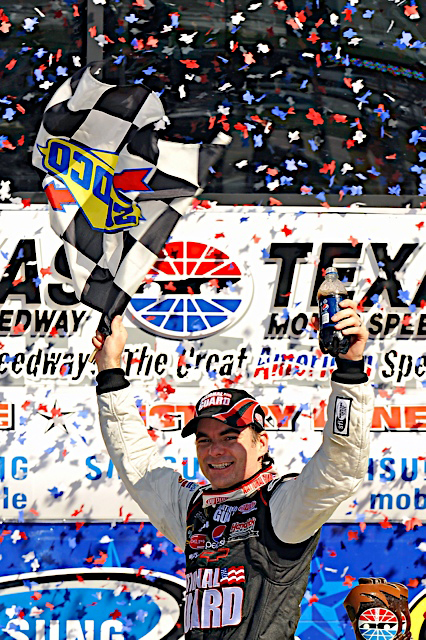
Gordon holding the checkered flag at the 2009 Samsung 500

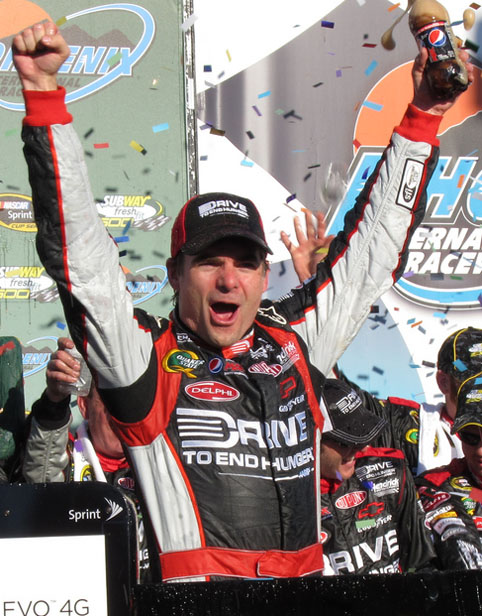
Gordon in Victory Lane with his team at the 2011 Subway Fresh Fit 500

Sprint Cup Series victories
No.	Date	Season	Race	Track	Location	Ref
1	May 29	1994	Coca-Cola 600	Charlotte Motor Speedway	Concord, North Carolina	
2	August 6	1994	Brickyard 400	Indianapolis Motor Speedway	Speedway, Indiana	
3	February 26	1995	Goodwrench 500	North Carolina Motor Speedway	Rockingham, North Carolina	
4	March 12	1995	Purolator 500	Atlanta Motor Speedway	Hampton, Georgia	
5	April 2	1995	Food City 500	Bristol International Raceway	Bristol, Tennessee	
6	July 1	1995	Pepsi 400	Daytona International Speedway	Daytona Beach, Florida	
7	July 9	1995	Slick 50 300	New Hampshire International Speedway	Loudon, New Hampshire	
8	September 3	1995	Mountain Dew Southern 500	Darlington Raceway	Darlington, South Carolina	
9	September 17	1995	MBNA 500	Dover Downs International Speedway	Dover, Delaware	
10	March 3	1996	Pontiac Excitement 400	Richmond International Raceway	Richmond, Virginia	
11	March 24	1996	TranSouth Financial 400	Darlington Raceway	Darlington, South Carolina	
12	March 31	1996	Food City 500	Bristol Motor Speedway	Bristol, Tennessee	
13	June 2	1996	Miller 500	Dover Downs International Speedway	Dover, Delaware	
14	June 16	1996	UAW-GM Teamwork 500	Pocono Raceway	Long Pond, Pennsylvania	
15	July 28	1996	DieHard 500	Talladega Superspeedway	Lincoln, Alabama	
16	September 1	1996	Mountain Dew Southern 500	Darlington Raceway	Darlington, South Carolina	
17	September 15	1996	MBNA 500	Dover Downs International Speedway	Dover, Delaware	
18	September 22	1996	Hanes 500	Martinsville Speedway	Ridgeway, Virginia	
19	September 29	1996	Tyson Holly Farms 400	North Wilkesboro Speedway	North Wilkesboro, North Carolina	
20	February 16	1997	Daytona 500	Daytona International Speedway	Daytona Beach, Florida	
21	February 23	1997	Goodwrench Service 400	North Carolina Motor Speedway	Rockingham, North Carolina	
22	April 13	1997	Food City 500	Bristol Motor Speedway	Bristol, Tennessee	
23	April 20	1997	Goody's Headache Powder 500	Martinsville Speedway	Ridgeway, Virginia	
24	May 25	1997	Coca-Cola 600	Charlotte Motor Speedway	Concord, North Carolina	
25	June 8	1997	Pocono 500	Pocono Raceway	Long Pond, Pennsylvania	
26	June 22	1997	California 500	California Speedway	Fontana, California	
27	August 10	1997	The Bud At The Glen	Watkins Glen International	Watkins Glen, New York	
28	August 31	1997	Mountain Dew Southern 500	Darlington Raceway	Darlington, South Carolina	
29	September 14	1997	CMT 300	New Hampshire International Speedway	Loudon, New Hampshire	
30	February 22	1998	GM Goodwrench Service Plus 400	North Carolina Motor Speedway	Rockingham, North Carolina	
31	March 29	1998	Food City 500	Bristol Motor Speedway	Bristol, Tennessee	
32	May 24	1998	Coca-Cola 600	Charlotte Motor Speedway	Concord, North Carolina	
33	June 28	1998	Save Mart/Kragen 350	Sears Point Raceway	Sonoma, California	
34	July 26	1998	Pennsylvania 500	Pocono Raceway	Long Pond, Pennsylvania	
35	August 1	1998	Brickyard 400	Indianapolis Motor Speedway	Speedway, Indiana	
36	August 9	1998	The Bud at the Glen	Watkins Glen International	Watkins Glen, New York	
37	August 16	1998	Pepsi 400	Michigan Speedway	Brooklyn, Michigan	
38	August 30	1998	Farm Aid on CMT 300	New Hampshire International Speedway	Loudon, New Hampshire	
39	September 6	1998	Pepsi Southern 500	Darlington Raceway	Darlington, South Carolina	
40	October 17	1998	Pepsi 400	Daytona International Speedway	Daytona Beach, Florida	
41	November 1	1998	AC Delco 400	North Carolina Speedway	Rockingham, North Carolina	
42	November 8	1998	NAPA 500	Atlanta Motor Speedway	Hampton, Georgia	
43	February 14	1999	Daytona 500	Daytona International Speedway	Daytona Beach, Florida	
44	March 14	1999	Cracker Barrel 500	Atlanta Motor Speedway	Hampton, Georgia	
45	May 2	1999	California 500	California Speedway	Fontana, California	
46	June 27	1999	Save Mart/Kragen 350	Sears Point Raceway	Sonoma, California	
47	August 15	1999	Frontier @ the Glen	Watkins Glen International	Watkins Glen, New York	
48	October 3	1999	NAPA AutoCare 500	Martinsville Speedway	Ridgeway, Virginia	
49	October 11	1999	UAW-GM Quality 500	Lowe's Motor Speedway	Concord, North Carolina	
50	April 16	2000	DieHard 500	Talladega Superspeedway	Lincoln, Alabama	
51	June 25	2000	Save Mart/Kragen 350	Sears Point Raceway	Sonoma, California	
52	September 9	2000	Chevrolet Monte Carlo 400	Richmond International Raceway	Richmond, Virginia	
53	March 4	2001	UAW-Daimler Chrysler 400	Las Vegas Motor Speedway	Las Vegas, Nevada	
54	June 3	2001	MBNA Platinum 400	Dover Downs International Speedway	Dover, Delaware	
55	June 10	2001	Kmart 400	Michigan International Speedway	Brooklyn, Michigan	
56	August 5	2001	Brickyard 400	Indianapolis Motor Speedway	Speedway, Indiana	
57	August 12	2001	Global Crossing at the Glen	Watkins Glen International	Watkins Glen, New York	
58	September 30	2001	Protection One 400	Kansas Speedway	Kansas City, Kansas	
59	August 24	2002	Sharpie 500	Bristol Motor Speedway	Bristol, Tennessee	
60	September 1	2002	Mountain Dew Southern 500	Darlington Raceway	Darlington, South Carolina	
61	September 29	2002	Protection One 400	Kansas Speedway	Kansas City, Kansas	
62	April 13	2003	Virginia 500	Martinsville Speedway	Ridgeway, Virginia	
63	October 19	2003	Subway 500	Martinsville Speedway	Ridgeway, Virginia	
64	October 27	2003	Bass Pro Shops MBNA 500	Atlanta Motor Speedway	Hampton, Georgia	
65	April 25	2004	Aaron's 499	Talladega Superspeedway	Lincoln, Alabama	
66	May 2	2004	Auto Club 500	California Speedway	Fontana, California	
67	June 27	2004	Dodge/Save Mart 350	Infineon Raceway	Sonoma, California	
68	July 3	2004	Pepsi 400	Daytona International Speedway	Daytona Beach, Florida	
69	August 8	2004	Brickyard 400	Indianapolis Motor Speedway	Speedway, Indiana	
70	February 20	2005	Daytona 500	Daytona International Speedway	Daytona Beach, Florida	
71	April 10	2005	Advance Auto Parts 500	Martinsville Speedway	Ridgeway, Virginia	
72	May 1	2005	Aaron's 499	Talladega Superspeedway	Lincoln, Alabama	
73	October 23	2005	Subway 500	Martinsville Speedway	Ridgeway, Virginia	
74	June 25	2006	Dodge/Save Mart 350	Infineon Raceway	Sonoma, California	
75	July 9	2006	USG Sheetrock 400	Chicagoland Speedway	Joliet, Illinois	
76	April 21	2007	Subway Fresh Fit 500	Phoenix International Raceway	Avondale, Arizona	
77	April 29	2007	Aaron's 499	Talladega Superspeedway	Lincoln, Alabama	
78	May 13	2007	Dodge Avenger 500	Darlington Raceway	Darlington, South Carolina	
79	June 10	2007	Pocono 500	Pocono Raceway	Long Pond, Pennsylvania	
80	October 7	2007	UAW-Ford 500	Talladega Superspeedway	Lincoln, Alabama	
81	October 13	2007	Bank of America 500	Lowe's Motor Speedway	Concord, North Carolina	
82	April 5	2009	Samsung 500	Texas Motor Speedway	Fort Worth, Texas	
83	February 27	2011	Subway Fresh Fit 500	Phoenix International Raceway	Avondale, Arizona	
84	June 12	2011	5-hour Energy 500	Pocono Raceway	Long Pond, Pennsylvania	
85	September 6	2011	AdvoCare 500	Atlanta Motor Speedway	Hampton, Georgia	
86	August 6	2012	Pennsylvania 400	Pocono Raceway	Long Pond, Pennsylvania	
87	November 18	2012	Ford EcoBoost 400	Homestead-Miami Speedway	Homestead, Florida	
88	October 27	2013	Goody's Headache Relief Shot 500	Martinsville Speedway	Ridgeway, Virginia	
89	May 10	2014	5-hour Energy 400	Kansas Speedway	Kansas City, Kansas	
90	July 27	2014	Crown Royal Presents The John Wayne Walding 400	Indianapolis Motor Speedway	Speedway, Indiana	
91	August 17	2014	Pure Michigan 400	Michigan International Speedway	Brooklyn, Michigan	
92	September 28	2014	AAA 400	Dover International Speedway	Dover, Delaware	
93	November 1	2015	Goody's Headache Relief Shot 500	Martinsville Speedway	Ridgeway, Virginia	

=== Busch Series ===
In NASCAR's second-level series, known variously as the Busch Grand National Series, Busch Series, and Nationwide Series during Gordon's driving career and now as the Xfinity Series, Gordon won five races. All of those wins were during the period in which Anheuser-Busch's Busch beer brand was series sponsor. Gordon was also the 1991 Busch Series Rookie of the Year.

Busch Series victories
No.	Date	Season	Race	Track	Location	Ref
1	March 14	1992	Atlanta 300	Atlanta Motor Speedway	Hampton, Georgia	
2	May 23	1992	Champion 300	Charlotte Motor Speedway	Concord, North Carolina	
3	October 10	1992	All Pro 300	Charlotte Motor Speedway	Concord, North Carolina	
4	November 6	1999	Outback Steakhouse 200	Phoenix International Raceway	Avondale, Arizona	
5	November 11	2000	Miami 300	Homestead-Miami Speedway	Homestead, Florida	

== See also ==
- NASCAR Cup Series career of Jeff Gordon
- List of all-time NASCAR Cup Series winners
