= 1998 Goody's Headache Powder 500 (Bristol) =

22nd race of the 1998 NASCAR Winston Cup Series

Race details
- Race 22 of 33 in the 1998 NASCAR Winston Cup Series
- The 1998 Goody's Headache Powder program cover.
- Date: August 22, 1998
- Official name: 38th Annual Goody's Headache Powder 500
- Location: Bristol, Tennessee, Bristol Motor Speedway
- Course: Permanent racing facility
- Course length: 0.858 km (0.533 miles)
- Distance: 500 laps, 266.5 mi (428.89 km)
- Scheduled distance: 500 laps, 266.5 mi (428.89 km)
- Average speed: 86.949 miles per hour (139.931 km/h)

Pole position
| Driver | Rusty Wallace | Penske-Kranefuss Racing |
- Time: 15.530

Most laps led
| Driver | Mark Martin | Roush Racing |
- Laps: 190

Winner
| No. 6 | Mark Martin | Roush Racing |

Television in the United States
- Network: ESPN
- Announcers: Jerry Punch, Ned Jarrett, Benny Parsons

Radio in the United States
- Radio: Performance Racing Network

The 1998 Goody's Headache Powder 500 was the 22nd stock car race of the 1998 NASCAR Winston Cup Series season and the 38th iteration of the event. The race was held on Saturday, August 22, 1998, in Bristol, Tennessee at Bristol Motor Speedway, a 0.533 miles (0.858 km) permanent oval-shaped racetrack. The race took the scheduled 500 laps to complete. At race's end, Roush Racing driver Mark Martin would dominate the late stages of the race to take his 27th career NASCAR Winston Cup Series victory and his fifth victory of the season. To fill out the podium, Roush Racing driver Jeff Burton and Penske-Kranefuss Racing driver Rusty Wallace would finish second and third, respectively.

== Background ==
The layout of Bristol Motor Speedway, the venue where the race was held.

The Bristol Motor Speedway, formerly known as Bristol International Raceway and Bristol Raceway, is a NASCAR short track venue located in Bristol, Tennessee. Constructed in 1960, it held its first NASCAR race on July 30, 1961. Despite its short length, Bristol is among the most popular tracks on the NASCAR schedule because of its distinct features, which include extraordinarily steep banking, an all concrete surface, two pit roads, and stadium-like seating. It has also been named one of the loudest NASCAR tracks.

=== Entry list ===
- (R) denotes rookie driver.

| # | Driver | Team | Make | Sponsor |
|---|---|---|---|---|
| 1 | Steve Park (R) | Dale Earnhardt, Inc. | Chevrolet | Pennzoil |
| 2 | Rusty Wallace | Penske-Kranefuss Racing | Ford | Miller Lite, Elvis Presley "Taking Care of Business" |
| 3 | Dale Earnhardt | Richard Childress Racing | Chevrolet | GM Goodwrench Service Plus |
| 4 | Bobby Hamilton | Morgan–McClure Motorsports | Chevrolet | Kodak |
| 5 | Terry Labonte | Hendrick Motorsports | Chevrolet | Kellogg's Frosted Flakes |
| 6 | Mark Martin | Roush Racing | Ford | Valvoline |
| 7 | Geoff Bodine | Mattei Motorsports | Ford | Philips |
| 9 | Jerry Nadeau (R) | Melling Racing | Ford | Cartoon Network "Happy Birthday NASCAR!" |
| 10 | Ricky Rudd | Rudd Performance Motorsports | Ford | Tide |
| 11 | Brett Bodine | Brett Bodine Racing | Ford | Paychex |
| 12 | Jeremy Mayfield | Penske-Kranefuss Racing | Ford | Mobil 1 |
| 13 | Dennis Setzer | Elliott-Marino Racing | Ford | FirstPlus Financial Group |
| 16 | Kevin Lepage (R) | Roush Racing | Ford | PrimeStar |
| 18 | Bobby Labonte | Joe Gibbs Racing | Pontiac | Interstate Batteries |
| 21 | Michael Waltrip | Wood Brothers Racing | Ford | Citgo |
| 22 | Ward Burton | Bill Davis Racing | Pontiac | MBNA |
| 23 | Ted Musgrave | Travis Carter Enterprises | Ford | Winston No Bull |
| 24 | Jeff Gordon | Hendrick Motorsports | Chevrolet | DuPont |
| 26 | Johnny Benson Jr. | Roush Racing | Ford | Trix, Cocoa Puffs, Lucky Charms |
| 28 | Kenny Irwin Jr. (R) | Robert Yates Racing | Ford | Texaco, Havoline |
| 30 | Derrike Cope | Bahari Racing | Pontiac | Gumout |
| 31 | Mike Skinner | Richard Childress Racing | Chevrolet | Lowe's |
| 33 | Ken Schrader | Andy Petree Racing | Chevrolet | Skoal |
| 35 | Darrell Waltrip | Tyler Jet Motorsports | Pontiac | Tabasco |
| 36 | Ernie Irvan | MB2 Motorsports | Pontiac | Skittles |
| 40 | Sterling Marlin | Team SABCO | Chevrolet | Coors Light |
| 41 | Steve Grissom | Larry Hedrick Motorsports | Chevrolet | Kodiak |
| 42 | Joe Nemechek | Team SABCO | Chevrolet | BellSouth |
| 43 | John Andretti | Petty Enterprises | Pontiac | STP |
| 44 | Kyle Petty | Petty Enterprises | Pontiac | Hot Wheels |
| 46 | Jeff Green | Team SABCO | Chevrolet | The Money Store |
| 50 | Wally Dallenbach Jr. | Hendrick Motorsports | Chevrolet | Budweiser |
| 71 | Dave Marcis | Marcis Auto Racing | Chevrolet | Team Realtree Camouflage |
| 75 | Rick Mast | Butch Mock Motorsports | Ford | Remington Arms |
| 77 | Robert Pressley | Jasper Motorsports | Ford | Jasper Engines & Transmissions |
| 78 | Gary Bradberry | Triad Motorsports | Ford | Pilot Travel Centers |
| 81 | Kenny Wallace | FILMAR Racing | Ford | Square D |
| 85 | Ken Bouchard | Mansion Motorsports | Ford | Mansion Motorsports |
| 88 | Dale Jarrett | Robert Yates Racing | Ford | Quality Care Service, Ford Credit |
| 90 | Dick Trickle | Donlavey Racing | Ford | Heilig-Meyers |
| 91 | Morgan Shepherd | LJ Racing | Chevrolet | LJ Racing |
| 92 | Elliott Sadler | Diamond Ridge Motorsports | Chevrolet | Phillips 66, TropArtic |
| 94 | Bill Elliott | Elliott-Marino Racing | Ford | McDonald's Mac Tonight |
| 96 | Hut Stricklin | American Equipment Racing | Chevrolet | Caterpillar |
| 97 | Chad Little | Roush Racing | Ford | John Deere |
| 98 | Rich Bickle | Cale Yarborough Motorsports | Ford | Thorn Apple Valley "Go Grill Crazy!" |
| 99 | Jeff Burton | Roush Racing | Ford | Exide Batteries |

== Practice ==
=== First practice ===
The first practice session was held on the morning of Friday, August 21. Mark Martin, driving for Roush Racing, would set the fastest time in the session, with a lap of 15.669 and an average speed of 122.458 mph (197.077 km/h).

| Pos. | # | Driver | Team | Make | Time | Speed |
|---|---|---|---|---|---|---|
| 1 | 6 | Mark Martin | Roush Racing | Ford | 15.669 | 122.458 |
| 2 | 2 | Rusty Wallace | Penske-Kranefuss Racing | Ford | 15.675 | 122.411 |
| 3 | 90 | Dick Trickle | Donlavey Racing | Ford | 15.712 | 122.123 |
Full first practice results

=== Second practice ===
The second practice session was held on the afternoon of Friday, August 21. Bobby Labonte, driving for Joe Gibbs Racing, would set the fastest time in the session, with a lap of 15.574 and an average speed of 123.205 mph (198.279 km/h).

| Pos. | # | Driver | Team | Make | Time | Speed |
|---|---|---|---|---|---|---|
| 1 | 18 | Bobby Labonte | Joe Gibbs Racing | Pontiac | 15.574 | 123.205 |
| 2 | 6 | Mark Martin | Roush Racing | Ford | 15.598 | 123.016 |
| 3 | 2 | Rusty Wallace | Penske-Kranefuss Racing | Ford | 15.607 | 122.945 |
Full second practice results

=== Final practice ===
The final practice session, sometimes referred to as Happy Hour, was held on the afternoon Saturday, August 22. Mark Martin, driving for Roush Racing, would set the fastest time in the session, with a lap of 16.143 and an average speed of 118.863 mph (191.291 km/h).

| Pos. | # | Driver | Team | Make | Time | Speed |
|---|---|---|---|---|---|---|
| 1 | 6 | Mark Martin | Roush Racing | Ford | 16.143 | 118.863 |
| 2 | 2 | Rusty Wallace | Penske-Kranefuss Racing | Ford | 16.211 | 118.364 |
| 3 | 24 | Jeff Gordon | Hendrick Motorsports | Chevrolet | 16.224 | 118.269 |
Full Happy Hour practice results

== Qualifying ==
Qualifying was split into two rounds. The first round was held on Friday, August 21, at 5:30 PM EST. Each driver would have one lap to set a time. During the first round, the top 25 drivers in the round would be guaranteed a starting spot in the race. If a driver was not able to guarantee a spot in the first round, they had the option to scrub their time from the first round and try and run a faster lap time in a second round qualifying run, held on Saturday, August 22, at 12:30 PM . As with the first round, each driver would have one lap to set a time. On January 24, 1998, NASCAR would announce that the amount of provisionals given would be increased from last season. Positions 26-36 would be decided on time, while positions 37-43 would be based on provisionals. Six spots are awarded by the use of provisionals based on owner's points. The seventh is awarded to a past champion who has not otherwise qualified for the race. If no past champion needs the provisional, the next team in the owner points will be awarded a provisional.

Rusty Wallace, driving for Penske-Kranefuss Racing, would win the pole, setting a time of 15.530 and an average speed of 123.554 miles per hour (198.841 km/h).

Four drivers would fail to qualify: Steve Grissom, Dave Marcis, Ken Bouchard, and Gary Bradberry.

=== Full qualifying results ===
| Pos. | # | Driver | Team | Make | Time | Speed |
|---|---|---|---|---|---|---|
| 1 | 2 | Rusty Wallace | Penske-Kranefuss Racing | Ford | 15.530 | 123.554 |
| 2 | 31 | Mike Skinner | Richard Childress Racing | Chevrolet | 15.534 | 123.523 |
| 3 | 10 | Ricky Rudd | Rudd Performance Motorsports | Ford | 15.562 | 123.300 |
| 4 | 6 | Mark Martin | Roush Racing | Ford | 15.565 | 123.277 |
| 5 | 12 | Jeremy Mayfield | Penske-Kranefuss Racing | Ford | 15.581 | 123.150 |
| 6 | 23 | Ted Musgrave | Travis Carter Enterprises | Ford | 15.581 | 123.150 |
| 7 | 24 | Jeff Gordon | Hendrick Motorsports | Chevrolet | 15.595 | 123.039 |
| 8 | 22 | Ward Burton | Bill Davis Racing | Pontiac | 15.595 | 123.039 |
| 9 | 88 | Dale Jarrett | Robert Yates Racing | Ford | 15.599 | 123.008 |
| 10 | 18 | Bobby Labonte | Joe Gibbs Racing | Pontiac | 15.599 | 123.008 |
| 11 | 7 | Geoff Bodine | Mattei Motorsports | Ford | 15.613 | 122.898 |
| 12 | 21 | Michael Waltrip | Wood Brothers Racing | Ford | 15.651 | 122.599 |
| 13 | 33 | Ken Schrader | Andy Petree Racing | Chevrolet | 15.653 | 122.584 |
| 14 | 46 | Jeff Green | Team SABCO | Chevrolet | 15.654 | 122.576 |
| 15 | 5 | Terry Labonte | Hendrick Motorsports | Chevrolet | 15.655 | 122.568 |
| 16 | 11 | Brett Bodine | Brett Bodine Racing | Ford | 15.656 | 122.560 |
| 17 | 98 | Rich Bickle | Cale Yarborough Motorsports | Ford | 15.656 | 122.560 |
| 18 | 9 | Jerry Nadeau (R) | Melling Racing | Ford | 15.660 | 122.529 |
| 19 | 99 | Jeff Burton | Roush Racing | Ford | 15.663 | 122.505 |
| 20 | 30 | Derrike Cope | Bahari Racing | Pontiac | 15.663 | 122.505 |
| 21 | 44 | Kyle Petty | Petty Enterprises | Pontiac | 15.677 | 122.396 |
| 22 | 42 | Joe Nemechek | Team SABCO | Chevrolet | 15.684 | 122.341 |
| 23 | 26 | Johnny Benson Jr. | Roush Racing | Ford | 15.696 | 122.248 |
| 24 | 16 | Kevin Lepage (R) | Roush Racing | Ford | 15.697 | 122.240 |
| 25 | 77 | Robert Pressley | Jasper Motorsports | Ford | 15.697 | 122.240 |
| 26 | 75 | Rick Mast | Butch Mock Motorsports | Ford | 15.706 | 122.170 |
| 27 | 94 | Bill Elliott | Elliott-Marino Racing | Ford | 15.711 | 122.131 |
| 28 | 43 | John Andretti | Petty Enterprises | Pontiac | 15.716 | 122.092 |
| 29 | 40 | Sterling Marlin | Team SABCO | Chevrolet | 15.716 | 122.092 |
| 30 | 3 | Dale Earnhardt | Richard Childress Racing | Chevrolet | 15.727 | 122.007 |
| 31 | 81 | Kenny Wallace | FILMAR Racing | Ford | 15.755 | 121.790 |
| 32 | 92 | Elliott Sadler | Diamond Ridge Motorsports | Chevrolet | 15.765 | 121.713 |
| 33 | 4 | Bobby Hamilton | Morgan–McClure Motorsports | Chevrolet | 15.808 | 121.382 |
| 34 | 28 | Kenny Irwin Jr. (R) | Robert Yates Racing | Ford | 15.810 | 121.366 |
| 35 | 97 | Chad Little | Roush Racing | Ford | 15.817 | 121.313 |
| 36 | 1 | Steve Park (R) | Dale Earnhardt, Inc. | Chevrolet | 15.827 | 121.236 |
Provisionals
| 37 | 36 | Ernie Irvan | MB2 Motorsports | Pontiac | -* | -* |
| 38 | 50 | Wally Dallenbach Jr. | Hendrick Motorsports | Chevrolet | -* | -* |
| 39 | 90 | Dick Trickle | Donlavey Racing | Ford | -* | -* |
| 40 | 91 | Morgan Shepherd | LJ Racing | Chevrolet | -* | -* |
| 41 | 13 | Dennis Setzer | Elliott-Marino Racing | Ford | -* | -* |
| 42 | 96 | Hut Stricklin | American Equipment Racing | Chevrolet | -* | -* |
Champion's Provisional
| 43 | 35 | Darrell Waltrip | Tyler Jet Motorsports | Pontiac | -* | -* |
Failed to qualify
| 44 | 41 | Steve Grissom | Larry Hedrick Motorsports | Chevrolet | 15.974 | 120.120 |
| 45 | 71 | Dave Marcis | Marcis Auto Racing | Chevrolet | 16.186 | 118.547 |
| 46 | 85 | Ken Bouchard | Mansion Motorsports | Ford | 16.345 | 117.394 |
| 47 | 78 | Gary Bradberry | Triad Motorsports | Ford | 16.441 | 116.708 |
Official qualifying results

== Race results ==
| Fin | St | # | Driver | Team | Make | Laps | Led | Status | Pts | Winnings |
|---|---|---|---|---|---|---|---|---|---|---|
| 1 | 4 | 6 | Mark Martin | Roush Racing | Ford | 500 | 190 | running | 185 | $85,315 |
| 2 | 19 | 99 | Jeff Burton | Roush Racing | Ford | 500 | 0 | running | 170 | $58,615 |
| 3 | 1 | 2 | Rusty Wallace | Penske-Kranefuss Racing | Ford | 500 | 17 | running | 170 | $53,165 |
| 4 | 9 | 88 | Dale Jarrett | Robert Yates Racing | Ford | 500 | 35 | running | 165 | $58,855 |
| 5 | 7 | 24 | Jeff Gordon | Hendrick Motorsports | Chevrolet | 500 | 0 | running | 155 | $58,650 |
| 6 | 30 | 3 | Dale Earnhardt | Richard Childress Racing | Chevrolet | 500 | 34 | running | 155 | $42,540 |
| 7 | 2 | 31 | Mike Skinner | Richard Childress Racing | Chevrolet | 500 | 0 | running | 146 | $33,965 |
| 8 | 5 | 12 | Jeremy Mayfield | Penske-Kranefuss Racing | Ford | 500 | 173 | running | 147 | $45,015 |
| 9 | 3 | 10 | Ricky Rudd | Rudd Performance Motorsports | Ford | 500 | 43 | running | 143 | $45,540 |
| 10 | 24 | 16 | Kevin Lepage (R) | Roush Racing | Ford | 500 | 0 | running | 134 | $42,590 |
| 11 | 33 | 4 | Bobby Hamilton | Morgan–McClure Motorsports | Chevrolet | 500 | 0 | running | 130 | $39,765 |
| 12 | 21 | 44 | Kyle Petty | Petty Enterprises | Pontiac | 500 | 0 | running | 127 | $33,965 |
| 13 | 15 | 5 | Terry Labonte | Hendrick Motorsports | Chevrolet | 500 | 0 | running | 124 | $37,715 |
| 14 | 13 | 33 | Ken Schrader | Andy Petree Racing | Chevrolet | 499 | 0 | running | 121 | $34,315 |
| 15 | 34 | 28 | Kenny Irwin Jr. (R) | Robert Yates Racing | Ford | 499 | 0 | running | 118 | $40,260 |
| 16 | 12 | 21 | Michael Waltrip | Wood Brothers Racing | Ford | 499 | 0 | running | 115 | $33,410 |
| 17 | 14 | 46 | Jeff Green | Team SABCO | Chevrolet | 499 | 0 | running | 112 | $21,260 |
| 18 | 17 | 98 | Rich Bickle | Cale Yarborough Motorsports | Ford | 499 | 0 | running | 109 | $28,210 |
| 19 | 27 | 94 | Bill Elliott | Elliott-Marino Racing | Ford | 498 | 0 | running | 106 | $32,300 |
| 20 | 6 | 23 | Ted Musgrave | Travis Carter Enterprises | Ford | 498 | 0 | running | 103 | $35,310 |
| 21 | 29 | 40 | Sterling Marlin | Team SABCO | Chevrolet | 498 | 0 | running | 100 | $24,735 |
| 22 | 37 | 36 | Ernie Irvan | MB2 Motorsports | Pontiac | 498 | 0 | running | 97 | $31,585 |
| 23 | 35 | 97 | Chad Little | Roush Racing | Ford | 497 | 0 | running | 94 | $24,435 |
| 24 | 32 | 92 | Elliott Sadler | Diamond Ridge Motorsports | Chevrolet | 497 | 0 | running | 91 | $20,760 |
| 25 | 10 | 18 | Bobby Labonte | Joe Gibbs Racing | Pontiac | 496 | 8 | running | 93 | $38,215 |
| 26 | 16 | 11 | Brett Bodine | Brett Bodine Racing | Ford | 496 | 0 | running | 85 | $30,790 |
| 27 | 43 | 35 | Darrell Waltrip | Tyler Jet Motorsports | Pontiac | 495 | 0 | running | 82 | $20,280 |
| 28 | 38 | 50 | Wally Dallenbach Jr. | Hendrick Motorsports | Chevrolet | 489 | 0 | running | 79 | $30,670 |
| 29 | 40 | 91 | Morgan Shepherd | LJ Racing | Chevrolet | 482 | 0 | running | 76 | $24,060 |
| 30 | 11 | 7 | Geoff Bodine | Mattei Motorsports | Ford | 481 | 0 | running | 73 | $30,450 |
| 31 | 22 | 42 | Joe Nemechek | Team SABCO | Chevrolet | 466 | 0 | running | 70 | $30,340 |
| 32 | 18 | 9 | Jerry Nadeau (R) | Melling Racing | Ford | 434 | 0 | handling | 67 | $23,230 |
| 33 | 23 | 26 | Johnny Benson Jr. | Roush Racing | Ford | 434 | 0 | running | 64 | $30,220 |
| 34 | 36 | 1 | Steve Park (R) | Dale Earnhardt, Inc. | Chevrolet | 422 | 0 | running | 61 | $22,710 |
| 35 | 26 | 75 | Rick Mast | Butch Mock Motorsports | Ford | 405 | 0 | crash | 58 | $20,205 |
| 36 | 20 | 30 | Derrike Cope | Bahari Racing | Pontiac | 353 | 0 | handling | 55 | $27,185 |
| 37 | 8 | 22 | Ward Burton | Bill Davis Racing | Pontiac | 313 | 0 | crash | 52 | $17,167 |
| 38 | 28 | 43 | John Andretti | Petty Enterprises | Pontiac | 303 | 0 | handling | 49 | $35,150 |
| 39 | 41 | 13 | Dennis Setzer | Elliott-Marino Racing | Ford | 290 | 0 | handling | 46 | $20,150 |
| 40 | 25 | 77 | Robert Pressley | Jasper Motorsports | Ford | 272 | 0 | overheating | 43 | $20,150 |
| 41 | 42 | 96 | Hut Stricklin | American Equipment Racing | Chevrolet | 237 | 0 | engine | 40 | $20,150 |
| 42 | 31 | 81 | Kenny Wallace | FILMAR Racing | Ford | 227 | 0 | engine | 37 | $20,150 |
| 43 | 39 | 90 | Dick Trickle | Donlavey Racing | Ford | 153 | 0 | crash | 34 | $27,650 |
Failed to qualify
| 44 | | 41 | Steve Grissom | Larry Hedrick Motorsports | Chevrolet | | | | | |
| 45 | | 71 | Dave Marcis | Marcis Auto Racing | Chevrolet | | | | | |
| 46 | | 85 | Ken Bouchard | Mansion Motorsports | Ford | | | | | |
| 47 | | 78 | Gary Bradberry | Triad Motorsports | Ford | | | | | |
Official race results

| Previous race: 1998 Pepsi 400 presented by DeVilbiss | NASCAR Winston Cup Series; 1998 season | Next race: 1998 Farm Aid on CMT 300 |
