= Bass Pro Shops Night Race =

NASCAR Cup Series race at Bristol Motor Speedway

NASCAR Cup Series
- Venue: Bristol Motor Speedway
- Location: Bristol, Tennessee, United States
- Corporate sponsor: Bass Pro Shops
- First race: 1961
- Distance: 266.5 miles (428.890 km)
- Laps: 500; Stages 1/2: 125 each Final stage: 250
- Previous names: Volunteer 500 (1961–1979); Busch Volunteer 500 (1980); Busch 500 (1981–1990); Bud 500 (1991–1993); Goody's 500 (1994–1995); Goody's Headache Powder 500 (1996–1999) goracing.com 500 (2000); Sharpie 500 (2001–2009); Irwin Tools Night Race (2010–2015); Bass Pro Shops NRA Night Race (2016–2021)
- Most wins (driver): Darrell Waltrip (7)
- Most wins (team): Junior Johnson & Associates; Joe Gibbs Racing (9)
- Most wins (manufacturer): Chevrolet; Ford (23)

Circuit information
- Surface: Concrete
- Length: 0.533 mi (0.858 km)
- Turns: 4

The Bass Pro Shops Night Race is a NASCAR Cup Series race held at Bristol Motor Speedway in Bristol, Tennessee. It is one of two NASCAR Cup Series races held at Bristol, the other being the Food City 500. Historically held in August from 1978 to 2019, and again in 2027. The race was moved to September from 2020 to 2026.

Joey Logano is the defending race winner.

== History ==
From 1961 to 1977 the race was not held at Night and was held during the day due to the track not having lights. The second date historically suffered from attendance issues during this period and was slid up and down the schedule from dates ranging from early July to November though most early races were held in July.

In 1977 after Bristol Motor Speedway founder Larry Carrier sold the track to Lanny Hester and Gary Baker and improvements were made to the facilities, they lobbied NASCAR to stabilize their two race dates with them asking for the spring race to be moved near April 1 and to move the second date from November to Late August. With the decision to race during the night primarily occurring due to heat concerns. The lights used in the 1978 race consisted of a high school football stadium system lights and temporary light towers. The first Night Race saw increased attendance and all subsequent editions of the race also held at night continued to see high attendance.

From 2001 to 2015, Newell Brands has been the title sponsor of the race, and until 2009 their marker pen brand Sharpie lent its name to the race. Newell Rubbermaid elected to change the race branding to promote one of its other brands, Irwin Industrial Tools. For the 2016 season, the main title sponsor switched to outdoor recreational retailer Bass Pro Shops.

In 2020, the race was moved from its traditional August date to mid-September, becoming a NASCAR Chase race.

== Past winners ==
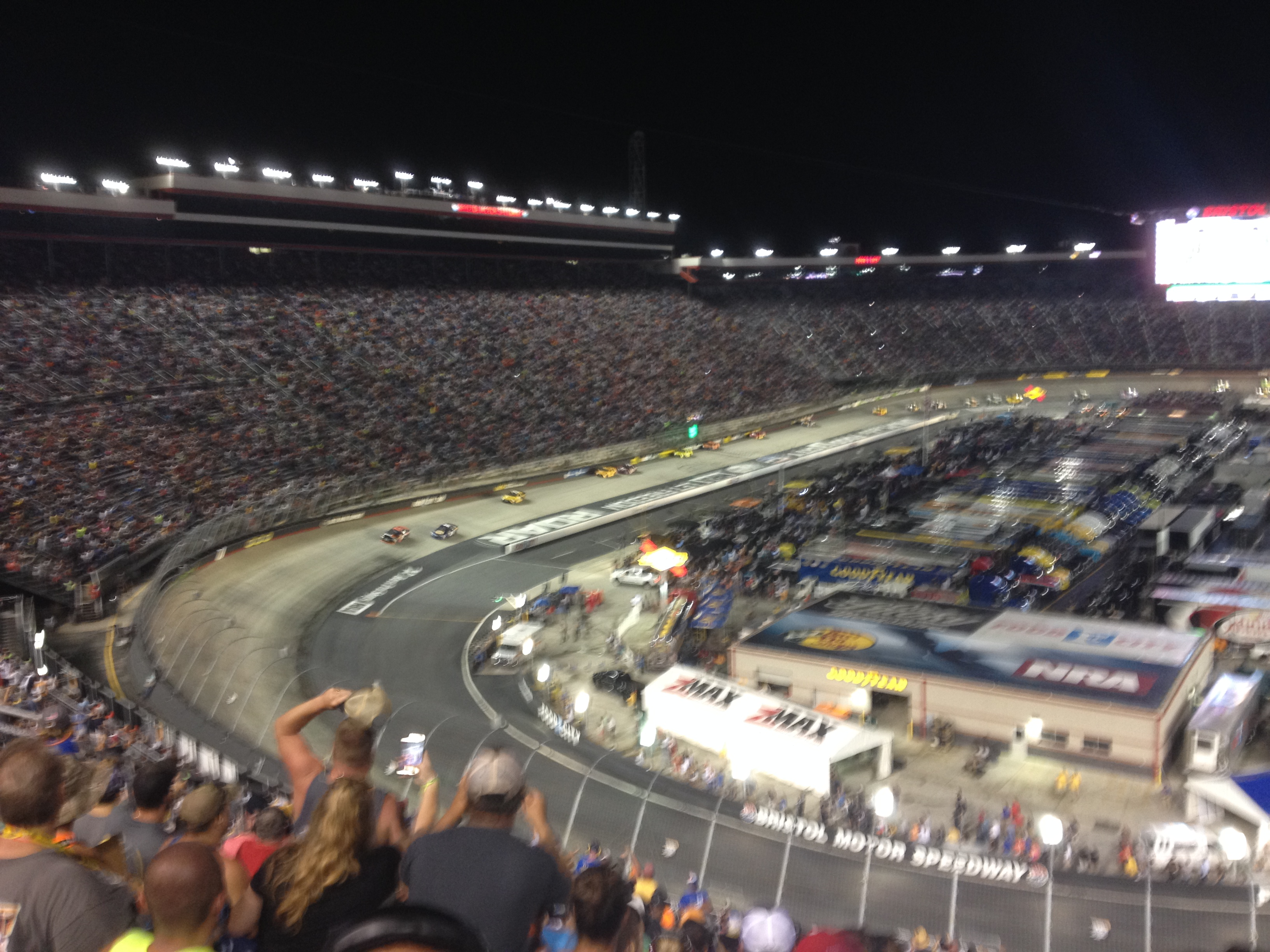
2016 Bass Pro Shops NRA Night Race

Year	Date	No.	Driver	Team	Manufacturer	Race distance		Race time	Average speed (mph)	Report	Ref
Year	Date	No.	Driver	Team	Manufacturer	Laps	Miles (km)	Race time	Average speed (mph)	Report	Ref
1961	July 30	46	Jack Smith*; Johnny Allen*	Jack Smith	Pontiac	500	250 (402.336)	3:39:23	68.278	Report	
1962	April 29	72	Bobby Johns	Shorty Johns	Pontiac	500	250 (402.336)	3:24:22	73.397	Report	
1963	July 28	28	Fred Lorenzen*; Ned Jarrett*	Holman-Moody	Ford	500	250 (402.336)	3:20:25	74.844	Report	
1964	July 26	28	Fred Lorenzen	Holman-Moody	Ford	500	250 (402.336)	3:12:12	78.044	Report	
1965	July 25	11	Ned Jarrett	Bondy Long	Ford	500	250 (402.336)	4:02:37	61.826	Report	
1966	July 24	99	Paul Goldsmith	Ray Nichels	Plymouth	500	250 (402.336)	3:12:24	77.963	Report	
1967	July 23	43	Richard Petty	Petty Enterprises	Plymouth	500	250 (402.336)	3:10:35	78.705	Report	
1968	July 21	17	David Pearson	Holman-Moody	Ford	500	250 (402.336)	3:16:34	76.31	Report	
1969	July 20	17	David Pearson	Holman-Moody	Ford	500	266.5 (428.89)	3:08:07	79.737	Report	
1970	July 19	22	Bobby Allison	Bobby Allison	Dodge	500	266.5 (428.89)	3:08:23	84.88	Report	
1971	July 11	3	Charlie Glotzbach*; Raymond Hassler*	Richard Howard	Chevrolet	500	266.5 (428.89)	2:38:12	101.074	Report	
1972	July 9	12	Bobby Allison	Richard Howard	Chevrolet	500	266.5 (428.89)	2:52:26	92.735	Report	
1973	July 8	72	Benny Parsons	L. G. DeWitt	Chevrolet	500	266.5 (428.89)	2:53:04	91.342	Report	
1974	July 14	11	Cale Yarborough	Junior Johnson & Associates	Chevrolet	500	266.5 (428.89)	3:31:59	75.43	Report	
1975	November 2	43	Richard Petty	Petty Enterprises	Dodge	500	266.5 (428.89)	2:44:49	97.016	Report	
1976	August 29	11	Cale Yarborough	Junior Johnson & Associates	Chevrolet	400	213.2 (343.112)	2:08:59	99.175	Report	
1977	August 28	11	Cale Yarborough	Junior Johnson & Associates	Chevrolet	400	213.2 (343.112)	2:40:27	79.726	Report	
1978*	August 26	11	Cale Yarborough	Junior Johnson & Associates	Oldsmobile	500	266.5 (428.89)	3:25:00	88.628	Report	
1979	August 25	88	Darrell Waltrip	DiGard Motorsports	Chevrolet	500	266.5 (428.89)	2:54:46	91.493	Report	
1980	August 23	11	Cale Yarborough	Junior Johnson & Associates	Chevrolet	500	266.5 (428.89)	3:03:51	86.973	Report	
1981	August 22	11	Darrell Waltrip	Junior Johnson & Associates	Buick	500	266.5 (428.89)	3:08:44	84.723	Report	
1982	August 28	11	Darrell Waltrip	Junior Johnson & Associates	Buick	500	266.5 (428.89)	2:49:32	94.318	Report	
1983	August 27	11	Darrell Waltrip	Junior Johnson & Associates	Buick	419*	222.794 (346.552)	2:29:50	89.43	Report	
1984	August 25	44	Terry Labonte	Hagan Racing	Chevrolet	500	266.5 (428.89)	3:07:19	85.365	Report	
1985	August 24	3	Dale Earnhardt	Richard Childress Racing	Chevrolet	500	266.5 (428.89)	3:27:44	81.388	Report	
1986	August 23	11	Darrell Waltrip	Junior Johnson & Associates	Chevrolet	500	266.5 (428.89)	3:03:55	86.934	Report	
1987	August 22	3	Dale Earnhardt	Richard Childress Racing	Chevrolet	500	266.5 (428.89)	2:56:56	90.278	Report	
1988	August 27	3	Dale Earnhardt	Richard Childress Racing	Chevrolet	500	266.5 (428.89)	3:22:59	78.775	Report	
1989	August 26	17	Darrell Waltrip	Hendrick Motorsports	Chevrolet	500	266.5 (428.89)	3:04:14	85.554	Report	
1990	August 25	4	Ernie Irvan	Morgan–McClure Motorsports	Chevrolet	500	266.5 (428.89)	2:54:13	91.782	Report	
1991	August 24	7	Alan Kulwicki	AK Racing	Ford	500	266.5 (428.89)	3:14:56	82.028	Report	
1992	August 29	17	Darrell Waltrip	DarWal, Inc.	Chevrolet	500	266.5 (428.89)	2:55:20	91.198	Report	
1993	August 28	6	Mark Martin	Roush Racing	Ford	500	266.5 (428.89)	3:01:21	88.172	Report	
1994	August 27	2	Rusty Wallace	Penske Racing	Ford	500	266.5 (428.89)	2:55:01	91.363	Report	
1995	August 26	5	Terry Labonte	Hendrick Motorsports	Chevrolet	500	266.5 (428.89)	3:15:03	81.979	Report	
1996	August 24	2	Rusty Wallace	Penske Racing	Ford	500	266.5 (428.89)	2:55:12	91.267	Report	
1997	August 23	88	Dale Jarrett	Robert Yates Racing	Ford	500	266.5 (428.89)	3:19:51	80.013	Report	
1998	August 22	6	Mark Martin	Roush Racing	Ford	500	266.5 (428.89)	3:03:54	86.949	Report	
1999	August 28	3	Dale Earnhardt	Richard Childress Racing	Chevrolet	500	266.5 (428.89)	2:55:11	91.276	Report	
2000	August 26	2	Rusty Wallace	Penske Racing	Ford	500	266.5 (428.89)	3:07:15	85.394	Report	
2001	August 25	20	Tony Stewart	Joe Gibbs Racing	Pontiac	500	266.5 (428.89)	3:07:53	85.106	Report	
2002	August 24	24	Jeff Gordon	Hendrick Motorsports	Chevrolet	500	266.5 (428.89)	3:27:24	77.097	Report	
2003	August 23	97	Kurt Busch	Roush Racing	Ford	500	266.5 (428.89)	3:26:32	77.421	Report	
2004	August 28	8	Dale Earnhardt Jr.	Dale Earnhardt, Inc.	Chevrolet	500	266.5 (428.89)	3:00:36	88.538	Report	
2005	August 27	17	Matt Kenseth	Roush Racing	Ford	500	266.5 (428.89)	3:08:50	84.678	Report	
2006	August 26	17	Matt Kenseth	Roush Racing	Ford	500	266.5 (428.89)	2:57:37	90.025	Report	
2007	August 25	99	Carl Edwards	Roush Fenway Racing	Ford	500	266.5 (428.89)	2:59:39	89.006	Report	
2008	August 23	99	Carl Edwards	Roush Fenway Racing	Ford	500	266.5 (428.89)	2:54:36	91.581	Report	
2009	August 22	18	Kyle Busch	Joe Gibbs Racing	Toyota	500	266.5 (428.89)	3:08:31	80.24	Report	
2010	August 21	18	Kyle Busch	Joe Gibbs Racing	Toyota	500	266.5 (428.89)	2:41:24	99.071	Report	
2011	August 27	2	Brad Keselowski	Penske Racing	Dodge	500	266.5 (428.89)	2:45:16	96.753	Report	
2012	August 25	11	Denny Hamlin	Joe Gibbs Racing	Toyota	500	266.5 (428.89)	3:09:27	84.402	Report	
2013	August 24	20	Matt Kenseth	Joe Gibbs Racing	Toyota	500	266.5 (428.89)	2:57:07	90.279	Report	
2014	August 23	22	Joey Logano	Team Penske	Ford	500	266.5 (428.89)	2:52:00	92.965	Report	
2015	August 22	22	Joey Logano	Team Penske	Ford	500	266.5 (428.89)	2:45:05	96.891	Report	
2016	August 20/21*	4	Kevin Harvick	Stewart–Haas Racing	Chevrolet	500	266.5 (428.89)	3:25:05	77.968	Report	
2017	August 19	18	Kyle Busch	Joe Gibbs Racing	Toyota	500	266.5 (428.89)	2:46:37	95.969	Report	
2018	August 18	41	Kurt Busch	Stewart–Haas Racing	Ford	500	266.5 (428.89)	2:58:35	89.538	Report	
2019	August 17	11	Denny Hamlin	Joe Gibbs Racing	Toyota	500	266.5 (428.89)	2:49:09	94.531	Report	
2020	September 19	4	Kevin Harvick	Stewart–Haas Racing	Ford	500	266.5 (428.89)	2:46:43	95.911	Report	
2021	September 18	5	Kyle Larson	Hendrick Motorsports	Chevrolet	500	266.5 (428.89)	3:02:56	87.409	Report	
2022	September 17	17	Chris Buescher	RFK Racing	Ford	500	266.5 (428.89)	3:01:07	88.286	Report	
2023	September 16	11	Denny Hamlin	Joe Gibbs Racing	Toyota	500	266.5 (428.89)	2:48:20	94.99	Report	
2024	September 21	5	Kyle Larson	Hendrick Motorsports	Chevrolet	500	266.5 (428.89)	2:37:53	101.277	Report	
2025	September 13	20	Christopher Bell	Joe Gibbs Racing	Toyota	500	266.5 (428.89)	3:48:10	69.686	Report	
2026	September 19	22	Joey Logano	Team Penske	Ford	500	266.5 (428.89)	3:02:20	87.697	Report	
2027	August 14									Report	

- 1983: Race shortened due to rain.
- 2016: Race started on Saturday night but was finished on Sunday afternoon due to rain.

=== Track length notes ===
- 1961–1968: 0.5 mile course
- 1969: 0.527 mile course
- 1970–present: 0.533 mile course

=== Multiple winners (drivers) ===
# of wins	Driver	Years won
7	Darrell Waltrip	1979, 1981–1983, 1986, 1989, 1992
5	Cale Yarborough	1974, 1976–1978, 1980
4	Dale Earnhardt	1985, 1987–1988, 1999
3	Rusty Wallace	1994, 1996, 2000
3	Matt Kenseth	2005–2006, 2013
3	Kyle Busch	2009–2010, 2017
3	Denny Hamlin	2012, 2019, 2023
3	Joey Logano	2014–2015, 2026
2	Fred Lorenzen	1963–1964
2	David Pearson	1968–1969
2	Bobby Allison	1970, 1972
2	Richard Petty	1967, 1975
2	Terry Labonte	1984, 1995
2	Mark Martin	1993, 1998
2	Carl Edwards	2007–2008
2	Kurt Busch	2003, 2018
2	Kevin Harvick	2016, 2020
2	Kyle Larson	2021, 2024

=== Multiple winners (teams) ===
# of wins	Team	Years won
9	Junior Johnson & Associates	1974, 1976–1978, 1980–1983, 1986
9	Joe Gibbs Racing	2001, 2009–2010, 2012–2013, 2017, 2019, 2023, 2025
8	RFK Racing	1993, 1998, 2003, 2005–2008, 2022
7	Team Penske	1994, 1996, 2000, 2011, 2014–2015, 2026
5	Hendrick Motorsports	1989, 1995, 2002, 2021, 2024
4	Holman-Moody	1963–1964, 1968–1969
4	Richard Childress Racing	1985, 1987–1988, 1999
3	Stewart–Haas Racing	2016, 2018, 2020
2	Petty Enterprises	1967, 1975
2	Richard Howard	1971–1972

=== Manufacturer wins ===
# of wins	Manufacturer	Years won
23	Chevrolet	1971–1974, 1976–1977, 1979–1980, 1984–1990, 1992, 1995, 1999, 2002, 2004, 2016, 2021, 2024
23	Ford	1963–1965, 1968–1969, 1991, 1993–1994, 1996–1998, 2000, 2003, 2005–2008, 2014–2015, 2018, 2020, 2022, 2026
8	Toyota	2009–2010, 2012–2013, 2017, 2019, 2023, 2025
3	Buick	1981–1983
3	Pontiac	1961–1962, 2001
3	Dodge	1970, 1975, 2011
1	Oldsmobile	1978

== Notable races ==
- 1964: Richard Petty led 442 laps but broke the rear end coming to the white flag and Fred Lorenzen erased a deficit of several laps to take the win.
- 1969: David Pearson survived multiple wrecks to win the first race with Bristol's new banking; the track banked its turns from 18 degrees to 36 to boost speeds; the change was criticized by most drivers due to the speeds, the resulting wrecks, and the greatly increased physical strain.
- 1971: Charlie Glotzbach needed relief help from Friday Hassler to post the win, the first for the new Richard Howard Chevrolet team wrenched by Junior Johnson; the race was run caution-free.
- 1973: Benny Parsons needed relief help from John Ustman to post his only win of the season; it was enough to help win the season championship.
- 1974: Neil Bonnett tore open forty feet of inside guardrail but was uninjured. On the final lap, Cale Yarborough forearmed Buddy Baker sideways out of the lead; the win was the first for Junior Johnson since Carling Brewery sponsorship helped him purchase the team from Richard Howard.
- 1977: Janet Guthrie needed relief help from John Utsman, who drove Guthrie's Chevrolet home sixth, the best NASCAR finish of Guthrie's career. Cale Yarborough took the win, his eighth of the season.
- 1978: Yarborough took the win in the first night running of the Volunteer 500. Following the announcement that Darrell Waltrip would drive for Harry Ranier in 1979, Ranier's present driver Lennie Pond got into several on-track skirmishes with Waltrip.
- 1979: Richard Petty won the final pole of his driving career and finished second to Darrell Waltrip.
- 1981: Waltrip finished a season sweep of Bristol races has Dale Earnhardt survived a brutal crash into pit road.
- 1984: After seven straight wins by Waltrip, Terry Labonte ended the streak by scratching to his second win of the 1984 season, a key win in his run to the '84 title.
- 1986: Darrell Waltrip scored his 1st Bristol win since winning his 7th straight race in the Spring of 1984. Darrell Waltrip scored his 10th Bristol win, passing Cale Yarborough as the all-time winningest driver at Bristol Motor Speedway. As of today, Darrell Waltrip is the only driver in NASCAR History to score 10 wins at Bristol.
- 1990: After Dale Earnhardt fell back Ernie Irvan beat Rusty Wallace in a late sprint to his first win.
- 1992: After Alan Kulwicki won the Spring race, the track was resurfaced from asphalt to concrete, and Darrell Waltrip became the 1st Bristol winner on the new surface. This would be Darrell Waltrip's 12th and final Bristol win.
- 1993: Fatigue affected Rusty Wallace as Mark Martin took the win, his third straight of 1993.
- 1995: Multiple crashes and the start being delayed by rain pushed the finish past midnight. Rusty Wallace was spun by Dale Earnhardt on lap 33, with NASCAR black-flagging Earnhardt and sending him to the tail of the lead lap. Bobby Hamilton received a similar penalty for twice wrecking Brett Bodine. Earnhardt worked his way back through the field and caught leader Terry Labonte on the final lap as he ran into lapped traffic. Earnhardt got into Labonte coming off turn 4 and spun him into the wall crossing the stripe, although Labonte still claimed the win and infamously drove his wrecked Chevrolet Monte-Carlo into victory lane. A furious Wallace threw a water bottle at Earnhardt during their post-race exchange.
- 1998: Mark Martin took the win and dedicated the race to his father Julian, who had died weeks earlier in a plane crash.
- 1999: Terry Labonte was leading with less than ten laps to go when he was spun out by Darrell Waltrip as they checked up for a caution. Labonte pitted for fresh tires and staged a furious charge from sixth to the lead, moving Dale Earnhardt for the lead coming to the white flag. Earnhardt responded by spinning Labonte in turn 2 on the final lap, wiping out several other leading cars in the process. The win was booed savagely by the surprised audience, with Earnhardt famously quoting that he never intended to wreck Labonte, and that he only meant to “rattle his cage”. This would be Earnhardt's 9th and final victory at Bristol, tying Cale Yarborough for 2nd on the all-time Bristol wins list (as of today).
- 2000: Rusty Wallace would pull off the 2000 Bristol season sweep by winning the Spring race, and this event. This would be the only time in his Career that Rusty Wallace would win both Bristol races in the same year. Rusty scored his 53rd career Cup Series win in this race, extending his record at the time as the 8th winningest driver in NASCAR History (currently 11th all-time as of today). This would be Rusty's 9th and final victory at Bristol, putting him in a 3-way tie with Cale Yarborough and Dale Earnhardt for 2nd on the all-time Bristol wins list (as of today).
- 2002: Jeff Gordon ended an at the time unprecedented 31 race winless streak after pulling a bump-and-run on Rusty Wallace with 3 laps to go. Gordon and Dale Earnhardt Jr. were the dominant drivers, Earnhardt leading the opening 130 laps. The race was full of flaring tempers, with a lot of drivers being summoned for various reasons to the Big Red Truck. The most memorable incident was Ward Burton, who threw his heel pads at Earnhardt after Earnhardt wrecked him on lap 403.
- 2003: After a post race confrontation with Kurt Busch the previous week at Michigan, Jimmy Spencer was suspended for a week by NASCAR. Busch was booed heavily during driver introductions, but went on to claim the win and sweep the season's races at the track.
- 2004: Dale Earnhardt Jr. became the first driver to sweep the weekend, winning the Busch race and the Cup race on the same weekend. In victory lane he labelled it as one of the biggest wins of his career, when asked why he added the quote “It’s Bristol baby!”.
- 2005-8: Roush Fenway Racing won four straight Sharpie 500s with the wins split by Matt Kenseth (2005 & 2006) and Carl Edwards (2007 & 2008).
- 2010: Kyle Busch won after dominating despite a tire going down on the final lap. This put Busch in the record books as the first driver to sweep all three top series' races on the same track on the same weekend, dubbed "The Trifecta". He also won the Camping World Truck race on Wednesday night and the Nationwide race on Friday night. Out of a possible 956 laps, he led 116 out of 206 in the truck event (race ended with G-W-C finish six laps past the scheduled distance of 200), 116 of 250 in the Nationwide event, and 282 of 500 in the Cup event. Together he led 514 of 956 laps or about 53.8% of the laps run.
- 2012: Denny Hamlin won, holding off Jeff Gordon and Jimmie Johnson. This was the first race after the top groove had been reground, leading to the return of bump-and-run racing. There were several on-track altercations. On lap 333, Matt Kenseth and Tony Stewart tangled fighting for the lead, and Stewart responded by throwing his helmet at Kenseth's hood. Later, Danica Patrick was wrecked by Regan Smith and wagged her finger at him.
- 2013: Matt Kenseth held off Kasey Kahne over the last 40 laps to win his fifth race of the season. This was the third race of the season where Kahne was within striking distance of the lead but was just unable to overtake Kenseth.
- 2017: Kyle Busch wins and sweeps all three top series' races for the second time at Bristol, having won the Camping World Truck race on Wednesday night and the Xfinity race on Friday night.
- 2021: Chase Elliott and Kevin Harvick were battling for the lead in the latter stages until contact between them saw Elliott cut a tire. A furious Elliott returned to the track two laps down and aggressively blocked Harvick, allowing his Hendrick teammate Kyle Larson to pass the latter for the win. Harvick confronted Elliott on pit road after the race.
- 2026: Carson Hocevar and Ryan Blaney were battling for second place in the final stage until contact between them saw Hocevar hit Blaney, sending him up into the wall. A furious Blaney returned to pit road after the race, won by Joey Logano, and fought Hocevar.

Previous race: Anduril 250	NASCAR Cup Series; Bass Pro Shops Night Race	Next race: Enjoy Illinois 300
