= 1995 Pepsi 400 =

15th race of the 1995 NASCAR Winston Cup Series

Race details
- Race 15 of 31 in the 1995 NASCAR Winston Cup Series
- The 1995 Pepsi 400 program cover, featuring Jimmy Spencer and Ernie Irvan.
- Date: July 1, 1995
- Official name: 37th Annual Pepsi 400
- Location: Daytona Beach, Florida, Daytona International Speedway
- Course: Permanent racing facility
- Course length: 2.5 miles (4.0 km)
- Distance: 160 laps, 400 mi (643.737 km)
- Scheduled distance: 160 laps, 400 mi (643.737 km)
- Average speed: 166.976 miles per hour (268.722 km/h)

Pole position
| Driver | Dale Earnhardt | Richard Childress Racing |
- Time: 47.033

Most laps led
| Driver | Sterling Marlin; Jeff Gordon | Morgan-McClure Motorsports; Hendrick Motorsports |
- Laps: 72

Winner
| No. 24 | Jeff Gordon | Hendrick Motorsports |

Television in the United States
- Network: ESPN
- Announcers: Bob Jenkins, Benny Parsons, Ned Jarrett

Radio in the United States
- Radio: Motor Racing Network

The 1995 Pepsi 400 was the 15th stock car race of the 1995 NASCAR Winston Cup Series and the 37th iteration of the event. The race was held on Saturday, July 1, 1995, in Daytona Beach, Florida at Daytona International Speedway, a 2.5 miles (4.0 km) permanent triangular-shaped superspeedway. The race took the scheduled 160 laps to complete. In a one-lap dash to the finish, Hendrick Motorsports driver Jeff Gordon would manage to defend the field to take his sixth career NASCAR Winston Cup Series victory and his fourth victory of the season. To fill out the top three, Morgan–McClure Motorsports driver Sterling Marlin and Richard Childress Racing driver Dale Earnhardt would finish second and third, respectively.

== Background ==
The layout of Daytona International Speedway, the venue where the race was held.

Daytona International Speedway is one of three superspeedways to hold NASCAR races, the other two being Indianapolis Motor Speedway and Talladega Superspeedway. The standard track at Daytona International Speedway is a four-turn superspeedway that is 2.5 miles (4.0 km) long. The track's turns are banked at 31 degrees, while the front stretch, the location of the finish line, is banked at 18 degrees.

=== Entry list ===
- (R) denotes rookie driver.

| # | Driver | Team | Make |
|---|---|---|---|
| 0 | Delma Cowart | H. L. Waters Racing | Ford |
| 1 | Rick Mast | Precision Products Racing | Pontiac |
| 2 | Rusty Wallace | Penske Racing South | Ford |
| 3 | Dale Earnhardt | Richard Childress Racing | Chevrolet |
| 4 | Sterling Marlin | Morgan–McClure Motorsports | Chevrolet |
| 5 | Terry Labonte | Hendrick Motorsports | Chevrolet |
| 6 | Mark Martin | Roush Racing | Ford |
| 7 | Geoff Bodine | Geoff Bodine Racing | Ford |
| 8 | Jeff Burton | Stavola Brothers Racing | Ford |
| 9 | Lake Speed | Melling Racing | Ford |
| 10 | Ricky Rudd | Rudd Performance Motorsports | Ford |
| 11 | Brett Bodine | Junior Johnson & Associates | Ford |
| 12 | Derrike Cope | Bobby Allison Motorsports | Ford |
| 15 | Dick Trickle | Bud Moore Engineering | Ford |
| 16 | Ted Musgrave | Roush Racing | Ford |
| 17 | Darrell Waltrip | Darrell Waltrip Motorsports | Chevrolet |
| 18 | Bobby Labonte | Joe Gibbs Racing | Chevrolet |
| 19 | Loy Allen Jr. | TriStar Motorsports | Ford |
| 21 | Morgan Shepherd | Wood Brothers Racing | Ford |
| 22 | Jimmy Hensley | Bill Davis Racing | Pontiac |
| 23 | Jimmy Spencer | Haas-Carter Motorsports | Ford |
| 24 | Jeff Gordon | Hendrick Motorsports | Chevrolet |
| 25 | Ken Schrader | Hendrick Motorsports | Chevrolet |
| 26 | Hut Stricklin | King Racing | Ford |
| 27 | Elton Sawyer | Junior Johnson & Associates | Ford |
| 28 | Dale Jarrett | Robert Yates Racing | Ford |
| 29 | Steve Grissom | Diamond Ridge Motorsports | Chevrolet |
| 30 | Michael Waltrip | Bahari Racing | Pontiac |
| 31 | Ward Burton | A.G. Dillard Motorsports | Chevrolet |
| 32 | Chuck Bown | Active Motorsports | Chevrolet |
| 33 | Robert Pressley (R) | Leo Jackson Motorsports | Chevrolet |
| 37 | John Andretti | Kranefuss-Haas Racing | Ford |
| 40 | Andy Hillenburg | Dick Brooks Racing | Pontiac |
| 41 | Ricky Craven (R) | Larry Hedrick Motorsports | Chevrolet |
| 42 | Kyle Petty | Team SABCO | Pontiac |
| 43 | Bobby Hamilton | Petty Enterprises | Pontiac |
| 44 | Jeff Purvis | Phoenix Racing | Ford |
| 65 | Steve Seligman | O'Neil Racing | Chevrolet |
| 71 | Dave Marcis | Marcis Auto Racing | Chevrolet |
| 75 | Todd Bodine | Butch Mock Motorsports | Ford |
| 77 | Bobby Hillin Jr. | Jasper Motorsports | Ford |
| 81 | Kenny Wallace | FILMAR Racing | Ford |
| 87 | Joe Nemechek | NEMCO Motorsports | Chevrolet |
| 90 | Mike Wallace | Donlavey Racing | Ford |
| 94 | Bill Elliott | Elliott-Hardy Racing | Ford |
| 98 | Jeremy Mayfield | Cale Yarborough Motorsports | Ford |

== Qualifying ==
Qualifying was split into two rounds. The first round was held on Friday, June 16, at 3:30 PM EST. Each driver would have one lap to set a time. During the first round, the top 20 drivers in the round would be guaranteed a starting spot in the race. If a driver was not able to guarantee a spot in the first round, they had the option to scrub their time from the first round and try and run a faster lap time in a second round qualifying run, held on Saturday, June 17, at 11:00 AM EST. As with the first round, each driver would have one lap to set a time. For this specific race, positions 21-38 would be decided on time, and depending on who needed it, a select amount of positions were given to cars who had not otherwise qualified but were high enough in owner's points.

Dale Earnhardt, driving for Richard Childress Racing, would win the pole, setting a time of 47.033 and an average speed of 191.355 miles per hour (307.956 km/h).

Three drivers would fail to qualify.

=== Full qualifying results ===
| Pos. | # | Driver | Team | Make | Time | Speed |
|---|---|---|---|---|---|---|
| 1 | 3 | Dale Earnhardt | Richard Childress Racing | Chevrolet | 47.033 | 191.355 |
| 2 | 4 | Sterling Marlin | Morgan–McClure Motorsports | Chevrolet | 47.190 | 190.718 |
| 3 | 24 | Jeff Gordon | Hendrick Motorsports | Chevrolet | 47.212 | 190.630 |
| 4 | 18 | Bobby Labonte | Joe Gibbs Racing | Chevrolet | 47.240 | 190.517 |
| 5 | 33 | Robert Pressley (R) | Leo Jackson Motorsports | Chevrolet | 47.242 | 190.508 |
| 6 | 75 | Todd Bodine | Butch Mock Motorsports | Ford | 47.339 | 190.118 |
| 7 | 28 | Dale Jarrett | Robert Yates Racing | Ford | 47.349 | 190.078 |
| 8 | 30 | Michael Waltrip | Bahari Racing | Pontiac | 47.414 | 189.817 |
| 9 | 17 | Darrell Waltrip | Darrell Waltrip Motorsports | Chevrolet | 47.425 | 189.773 |
| 10 | 6 | Mark Martin | Roush Racing | Ford | 47.440 | 189.713 |
| 11 | 9 | Lake Speed | Melling Racing | Ford | 47.448 | 189.681 |
| 12 | 15 | Dick Trickle | Bud Moore Engineering | Ford | 47.452 | 189.665 |
| 13 | 21 | Morgan Shepherd | Wood Brothers Racing | Ford | 47.455 | 189.653 |
| 14 | 10 | Ricky Rudd | Rudd Performance Motorsports | Ford | 47.483 | 189.542 |
| 15 | 23 | Jimmy Spencer | Travis Carter Enterprises | Ford | 47.495 | 189.494 |
| 16 | 42 | Kyle Petty | Team SABCO | Pontiac | 47.496 | 189.490 |
| 17 | 87 | Joe Nemechek | NEMCO Motorsports | Chevrolet | 47.515 | 189.414 |
| 18 | 19 | Loy Allen Jr. | TriStar Motorsports | Ford | 47.530 | 189.354 |
| 19 | 44 | Jeff Purvis | Phoenix Racing | Chevrolet | 47.567 | 189.207 |
| 20 | 27 | Greg Sacks | Junior Johnson & Associates | Ford | 47.606 | 189.052 |
Failed to lock in Round 1
| 21 | 16 | Ted Musgrave | Roush Racing | Ford | 47.615 | 189.016 |
| 22 | 2 | Rusty Wallace | Penske Racing South | Ford | 47.660 | 188.838 |
| 23 | 90 | Mike Wallace | Donlavey Racing | Ford | 47.684 | 188.743 |
| 24 | 11 | Brett Bodine | Junior Johnson & Associates | Ford | 47.699 | 188.683 |
| 25 | 7 | Geoff Bodine | Geoff Bodine Racing | Ford | 47.713 | 188.628 |
| 26 | 25 | Ken Schrader | Hendrick Motorsports | Chevrolet | 47.726 | 188.576 |
| 27 | 71 | Dave Marcis | Marcis Auto Racing | Chevrolet | 47.759 | 188.446 |
| 28 | 1 | Rick Mast | Precision Products Racing | Ford | 47.775 | 188.383 |
| 29 | 32 | Chuck Bown | Active Motorsports | Chevrolet | 47.840 | 188.127 |
| 30 | 26 | Hut Stricklin | King Racing | Ford | 47.869 | 188.013 |
| 31 | 22 | Jimmy Hensley | Bill Davis Racing | Pontiac | 47.896 | 187.907 |
| 32 | 8 | Jeff Burton | Stavola Brothers Racing | Ford | 47.906 | 187.868 |
| 33 | 5 | Terry Labonte | Hendrick Motorsports | Chevrolet | 47.998 | 187.508 |
| 34 | 29 | Steve Grissom | Diamond Ridge Motorsports | Chevrolet | 48,000 | 187.500 |
| 35 | 98 | Jeremy Mayfield | Cale Yarborough Motorsports | Ford | 48.007 | 187.473 |
| 36 | 37 | John Andretti | Kranefuss-Haas Racing | Ford | 48.041 | 187.340 |
| 37 | 12 | Derrike Cope | Bobby Allison Motorsports | Ford | 48.089 | 187.153 |
| 38 | 77 | Bobby Hillin Jr. | Jasper Motorsports | Ford | 48.127 | 187.005 |
Provisionals
| 39 | 43 | Bobby Hamilton | Petty Enterprises | Pontiac | 48.331 | 186.216 |
| 40 | 41 | Ricky Craven (R) | Larry Hedrick Motorsports | Chevrolet | 48.160 | 186.877 |
| 41 | 31 | Ward Burton | A.G. Dillard Motorsports | Chevrolet | 48.242 | 186.559 |
| 42 | 40 | Andy Hillenburg | Dick Brooks Racing | Pontiac | 48.162 | 186.869 |
Champion's Provisional
| 43 | 94 | Bill Elliott | Elliott-Hardy Racing | Ford | 48.296 | 186.351 |
Failed to qualify
| 44 | 65 | Steve Seligman | O'Neil Racing | Chevrolet | 49.114 | 183.247 |
| 45 | 81 | Kenny Wallace | FILMAR Racing | Ford | 49.172 | 183.031 |
| 46 | 0 | Delma Cowart | H. L. Waters Racing | Ford | 49.679 | 181.163 |
Official first round qualifying results
Official starting lineup

== Race results ==
| Fin | St | # | Driver | Team | Make | Laps | Led | Status | Pts | Winnings |
|---|---|---|---|---|---|---|---|---|---|---|
| 1 | 3 | 24 | Jeff Gordon | Hendrick Motorsports | Chevrolet | 160 | 72 | running | 185 | $96,580 |
| 2 | 2 | 4 | Sterling Marlin | Morgan–McClure Motorsports | Chevrolet | 160 | 72 | running | 180 | $63,450 |
| 3 | 1 | 3 | Dale Earnhardt | Richard Childress Racing | Chevrolet | 160 | 11 | running | 170 | $66,200 |
| 4 | 10 | 6 | Mark Martin | Roush Racing | Ford | 160 | 0 | running | 160 | $43,225 |
| 5 | 21 | 16 | Ted Musgrave | Roush Racing | Ford | 160 | 0 | running | 155 | $39,075 |
| 6 | 26 | 25 | Ken Schrader | Hendrick Motorsports | Chevrolet | 160 | 0 | running | 150 | $36,075 |
| 7 | 16 | 42 | Kyle Petty | Team SABCO | Pontiac | 160 | 0 | running | 146 | $29,375 |
| 8 | 14 | 10 | Ricky Rudd | Rudd Performance Motorsports | Ford | 160 | 5 | running | 147 | $31,775 |
| 9 | 15 | 23 | Jimmy Spencer | Travis Carter Enterprises | Ford | 160 | 0 | running | 138 | $22,275 |
| 10 | 43 | 94 | Bill Elliott | Elliott-Hardy Racing | Ford | 160 | 0 | running | 134 | $26,125 |
| 11 | 5 | 33 | Robert Pressley (R) | Leo Jackson Motorsports | Chevrolet | 160 | 0 | running | 130 | $26,615 |
| 12 | 12 | 15 | Dick Trickle | Bud Moore Engineering | Ford | 160 | 0 | running | 127 | $24,920 |
| 13 | 37 | 12 | Derrike Cope | Bobby Allison Motorsports | Ford | 160 | 0 | running | 124 | $19,530 |
| 14 | 25 | 7 | Geoff Bodine | Geoff Bodine Racing | Ford | 160 | 0 | running | 121 | $29,890 |
| 15 | 8 | 30 | Michael Waltrip | Bahari Racing | Pontiac | 160 | 0 | running | 118 | $24,950 |
| 16 | 30 | 26 | Hut Stricklin | King Racing | Ford | 160 | 0 | running | 115 | $19,860 |
| 17 | 20 | 27 | Greg Sacks | Junior Johnson & Associates | Ford | 160 | 0 | running | 112 | $22,620 |
| 18 | 32 | 8 | Jeff Burton | Stavola Brothers Racing | Ford | 160 | 0 | running | 109 | $23,105 |
| 19 | 33 | 5 | Terry Labonte | Hendrick Motorsports | Chevrolet | 160 | 0 | running | 106 | $28,965 |
| 20 | 24 | 11 | Brett Bodine | Junior Johnson & Associates | Ford | 159 | 0 | running | 103 | $28,650 |
| 21 | 11 | 9 | Lake Speed | Melling Racing | Ford | 159 | 0 | running | 100 | $17,280 |
| 22 | 40 | 41 | Ricky Craven (R) | Larry Hedrick Motorsports | Chevrolet | 159 | 0 | running | 97 | $17,560 |
| 23 | 6 | 75 | Todd Bodine | Butch Mock Motorsports | Ford | 159 | 0 | running | 94 | $21,790 |
| 24 | 13 | 21 | Morgan Shepherd | Wood Brothers Racing | Ford | 159 | 0 | running | 91 | $21,570 |
| 25 | 27 | 71 | Dave Marcis | Marcis Auto Racing | Chevrolet | 159 | 0 | running | 88 | $16,550 |
| 26 | 28 | 1 | Rick Mast | Precision Products Racing | Ford | 159 | 0 | running | 85 | $21,090 |
| 27 | 22 | 2 | Rusty Wallace | Penske Racing South | Ford | 159 | 0 | running | 82 | $28,035 |
| 28 | 38 | 77 | Bobby Hillin Jr. | Jasper Motorsports | Ford | 159 | 0 | running | 79 | $12,715 |
| 29 | 29 | 32 | Chuck Bown | Active Motorsports | Chevrolet | 159 | 0 | running | 76 | $13,120 |
| 30 | 31 | 22 | Jimmy Hensley | Bill Davis Racing | Pontiac | 159 | 0 | running | 73 | $20,525 |
| 31 | 18 | 19 | Loy Allen Jr. | TriStar Motorsports | Ford | 159 | 0 | running | 70 | $12,470 |
| 32 | 35 | 98 | Jeremy Mayfield | Cale Yarborough Motorsports | Ford | 158 | 0 | running | 67 | $15,440 |
| 33 | 36 | 37 | John Andretti | Kranefuss-Haas Racing | Ford | 158 | 0 | running | 64 | $14,910 |
| 34 | 9 | 17 | Darrell Waltrip | Darrell Waltrip Motorsports | Chevrolet | 158 | 0 | running | 61 | $17,380 |
| 35 | 41 | 31 | Ward Burton | A.G. Dillard Motorsports | Chevrolet | 157 | 0 | running | 58 | $12,350 |
| 36 | 42 | 40 | Andy Hillenburg | Dick Brooks Racing | Pontiac | 157 | 0 | running | 55 | $17,320 |
| 37 | 23 | 90 | Mike Wallace | Donlavey Racing | Ford | 155 | 0 | running | 52 | $12,291 |
| 38 | 17 | 87 | Joe Nemechek | NEMCO Motorsports | Chevrolet | 155 | 0 | running | 49 | $13,145 |
| 39 | 19 | 44 | Jeff Purvis | Phoenix Racing | Chevrolet | 128 | 0 | crash | 46 | $12,245 |
| 40 | 39 | 43 | Bobby Hamilton | Petty Enterprises | Pontiac | 118 | 0 | overheating | 43 | $12,245 |
| 41 | 4 | 18 | Bobby Labonte | Joe Gibbs Racing | Chevrolet | 48 | 0 | piston | 40 | $25,245 |
| 42 | 7 | 28 | Dale Jarrett | Robert Yates Racing | Ford | 38 | 0 | engine | 37 | $27,645 |
| 43 | 34 | 29 | Steve Grissom | Diamond Ridge Motorsports | Chevrolet | 34 | 0 | crash | 34 | $12,245 |
Official race results

| Previous race: 1995 Miller Genuine Draft 400 (Michigan) | NASCAR Winston Cup Series; 1995 season | Next race: 1995 Slick 50 300 |
