= 1998 The Bud at The Glen =

20th race of the 1998 NASCAR Winston Cup Series

Race details
- Race 20 of 33 in the 1998 NASCAR Winston Cup Series
- The 1998 The Bud at The Glen program cover.
- Date: August 9, 1998
- Official name: 13th Annual The Bud at The Glen
- Location: Watkins Glen, New York, Watkins Glen International
- Course: Permanent racing facility
- Course length: 2.45 miles (3.943 km)
- Distance: 90 laps, 220.5 mi (354.86 km)
- Scheduled distance: 90 laps, 220.5 mi (354.86 km)
- Average speed: 94.466 miles per hour (152.028 km/h)

Pole position
Driver	Jeff Gordon	Hendrick Motorsports
- Time: 1:13.298

Most laps led
Driver	Jeff Gordon	Hendrick Motorsports
- Laps: 55

Winner
No. 24	Jeff Gordon	Hendrick Motorsports

Television in the United States
- Network: ESPN
- Announcers: Bob Jenkins, Ned Jarrett, Benny Parsons

Radio in the United States
- Radio: Motor Racing Network

The 1998 The Bud at The Glen was the 20th stock car race of the 1998 NASCAR Winston Cup Series season and the 17th iteration of the event. The race was held on Sunday, August 9, 1998, at the shortened layout of Watkins Glen International, a 2.45 miles (3.943 km) permanent road course layout. The race took the scheduled 90 laps to complete. Within the closing laps of the race, Hendrick Motorsports driver Jeff Gordon would make a late race charge and pass for the lead with four to go to win his 36th career NASCAR Winston Cup Series victory, his seventh of the season, and his third consecutive victory up to that point. To fill out the podium, Roush Racing driver Mark Martin and Richard Childress Racing driver Mike Skinner would finish second and third, respectively.

== Background ==
The layout of Watkins Glen International NASCAR uses.

Watkins Glen International (nicknamed "The Glen") is an automobile race track located in Watkins Glen, New York at the southern tip of Seneca Lake. It was long known around the world as the home of the Formula One United States Grand Prix, which it hosted for twenty consecutive years (1961–1980), but the site has been home to road racing of nearly every class, including the World Sportscar Championship, Trans-Am, Can-Am, NASCAR Sprint Cup Series, the International Motor Sports Association and the IndyCar Series.

Initially, public roads in the village were used for the race course. In 1956 a permanent circuit for the race was built. In 1968 the race was extended to six hours, becoming the 6 Hours of Watkins Glen. The circuit's current layout has more or less been the same since 1971, although a chicane was installed at the uphill Esses in 1975 to slow cars through these corners, where there was a fatality during practice at the 1973 United States Grand Prix. The chicane was removed in 1985, but another chicane called the "Inner Loop" was installed in 1992 after J. D. McDuffie's fatal accident during the previous year's NASCAR Winston Cup event.

The circuit is known as the Mecca of North American road racing and is a very popular venue among fans and drivers. The facility is currently owned by NASCAR.

=== Entry list ===
- (R) denotes rookie driver.

No.	Driver	Team	Make
1	Steve Park (R)	Dale Earnhardt, Inc.	Chevrolet
2	Rusty Wallace	Penske-Kranefuss Racing	Ford
3	Dale Earnhardt	Richard Childress Racing	Chevrolet
4	Bobby Hamilton	Morgan–McClure Motorsports	Chevrolet
5	Terry Labonte	Hendrick Motorsports	Chevrolet
6	Mark Martin	Roush Racing	Ford
7	Geoff Bodine	Mattei Motorsports	Ford
9	Jerry Nadeau (R)	Melling Racing	Ford
10	Ricky Rudd	Rudd Performance Motorsports	Ford
11	Brett Bodine	Brett Bodine Racing	Ford
12	Jeremy Mayfield	Penske-Kranefuss Racing	Ford
13	Tom Hubert	Elliott-Marino Racing	Ford
16	Ted Musgrave	Roush Racing	Ford
18	Bobby Labonte	Joe Gibbs Racing	Pontiac
21	Michael Waltrip	Wood Brothers Racing	Ford
22	Ward Burton	Bill Davis Racing	Pontiac
23	Jimmy Spencer	Haas-Carter Motorsports	Ford
24	Jeff Gordon	Hendrick Motorsports	Chevrolet
26	Johnny Benson Jr.	Roush Racing	Ford
28	Kenny Irwin Jr. (R)	Robert Yates Racing	Ford
30	Derrike Cope	Bahari Racing	Pontiac
31	Mike Skinner	Richard Childress Racing	Chevrolet
33	Ken Schrader	Andy Petree Racing	Chevrolet
35	Darrell Waltrip	Tyler Jet Motorsports	Chevrolet
36	Ernie Irvan	MB2 Motorsports	Pontiac
40	Sterling Marlin	Team SABCO	Chevrolet
41	Steve Grissom	Larry Hedrick Motorsports	Chevrolet
42	Joe Nemechek	Team SABCO	Chevrolet
43	John Andretti	Petty Enterprises	Pontiac
44	Kyle Petty	Petty Enterprises	Pontiac
46	Tommy Kendall	Team SABCO	Chevrolet
50	Ricky Craven	Hendrick Motorsports	Chevrolet
58	Larry Gunselman	SBIII Motorsports	Ford
59	Brian Cunningham	CSG Racing	Ford
71	Dave Marcis	Marcis Auto Racing	Chevrolet
75	Rick Mast	Butch Mock Motorsports	Ford
77	Robert Pressley	Jasper Motorsports	Ford
81	Kenny Wallace	FILMAR Racing	Ford
88	Dale Jarrett	Robert Yates Racing	Ford
90	Dick Trickle	Donlavey Racing	Ford
91	Morgan Shepherd	LJ Racing	Chevrolet
94	Bill Elliott	Elliott-Marino Racing	Ford
96	Ron Fellows	American Equipment Racing	Chevrolet
97	Chad Little	Roush Racing	Ford
98	Rich Bickle	Cale Yarborough Motorsports	Ford
99	Jeff Burton	Roush Racing	Ford

== Practice ==
=== First practice ===
The first practice session was held on Friday, August 7, at 9:30 AM EST. The session would last for three hours and 30 minutes. Mark Martin, driving for Roush Racing, would set the fastest time in the session, with a lap of 1:13.486 and an average speed of 120.023 mph (193.158 km/h).

Pos.	No.	Driver	Team	Make	Time	Speed
1	6	Mark Martin	Roush Racing	Ford	1:13.486	120.023
2	94	Bill Elliott	Elliott-Marino Racing	Ford	1:13.638	119.775
3	23	Boris Said	Haas-Carter Motorsports	Ford	1:13.728	119.629
Full first practice results

=== Final practice ===
The final practice session was held on Saturday, August 8, at 2:15 PM EST. The session would last for one hour. Mark Martin, driving for Roush Racing, would set the fastest time in the session, with a lap of 1:14.353 and an average speed of 118.623 mph (190.905 km/h).

Pos.	No.	Driver	Team	Make	Time	Speed
1	6	Mark Martin	Roush Racing	Ford	1:14.353	118.623
2	24	Jeff Gordon	Hendrick Motorsports	Chevrolet	1:14.448	118.472
3	2	Rusty Wallace	Penske-Kranefuss Racing	Ford	1:14.763	117.973
Full final practice results

== Qualifying ==
Qualifying was split into two rounds. The first round was held on Friday, August 7, at 2:00 PM EST. Each driver would have one lap to set a time. During the first round, the top 25 drivers in the round would be guaranteed a starting spot in the race. If a driver was not able to guarantee a spot in the first round, they had the option to scrub their time from the first round and try and run a faster lap time in a second round qualifying run, held on Saturday, August 8, at 10:45 AM EST. As with the first round, each driver would have one lap to set a time. On January 24, 1998, NASCAR would announce that the amount of provisionals given would be increased from last season. Positions 26-36 would be decided on time, while positions 37-43 would be based on provisionals. Six spots are awarded by the use of provisionals based on owner's points. The seventh is awarded to a past champion who has not otherwise qualified for the race. If no past champion needs the provisional, the next team in the owner points will be awarded a provisional.

Jeff Gordon, driving for Hendrick Motorsports, would win the pole, setting a time of 1:13.298 and an average speed of 120.331 miles per hour (193.654 km/h).

Three drivers would fail to qualify: Dave Marcis, Brian Cunningham, and Larry Gunselman.

=== Full qualifying results ===
Pos.	No.	Driver	Team	Make	Time	Speed
1	24	Jeff Gordon	Hendrick Motorsports	Chevrolet	1:13.298	120.331
2	96	Ron Fellows	American Equipment Racing	Chevrolet	1:13.499	120.002
3	10	Ricky Rudd	Rudd Performance Motorsports	Ford	1:13.553	119.914
4	99	Jeff Burton	Roush Racing	Ford	1:13.555	119.910
5	23	Jimmy Spencer	Travis Carter Enterprises	Ford	1:13.635	119.780
6	2	Rusty Wallace	Penske-Kranefuss Racing	Ford	1:13.641	119.770
7	6	Mark Martin	Roush Racing	Ford	1:13.682	119.704
8	9	Jerry Nadeau (R)	Melling Racing	Ford	1:13.693	119.686
9	36	Ernie Irvan	MB2 Motorsports	Pontiac	1:13.761	119.575
10	88	Dale Jarrett	Robert Yates Racing	Ford	1:13.789	119.530
11	7	Geoff Bodine	Mattei Motorsports	Ford	1:13.840	119.447
12	5	Terry Labonte	Hendrick Motorsports	Chevrolet	1:13.880	119.383
13	40	Sterling Marlin	Team SABCO	Chevrolet	1:13.914	119.328
14	4	Bobby Hamilton	Morgan–McClure Motorsports	Chevrolet	1:13.960	119.254
15	16	Ted Musgrave	Roush Racing	Ford	1:13.960	119.254
16	33	Ken Schrader	Andy Petree Racing	Chevrolet	1:14.020	119.157
17	43	John Andretti	Petty Enterprises	Pontiac	1:14.043	119.120
18	28	Kenny Irwin Jr. (R)	Robert Yates Racing	Ford	1:14.106	119.019
19	81	Kenny Wallace	FILMAR Racing	Ford	1:14.190	118.884
20	13	Tom Hubert	Elliott-Marino Racing	Ford	1:14.195	118.876
21	26	Johnny Benson Jr.	Roush Racing	Ford	1:14.244	118.797
22	3	Dale Earnhardt	Richard Childress Racing	Chevrolet	1:14.277	118.745
23	31	Mike Skinner	Richard Childress Racing	Chevrolet	1:14.303	118.703
24	77	Robert Pressley	Jasper Motorsports	Ford	1:14.312	118.689
25	22	Ward Burton	Bill Davis Racing	Pontiac	1:14.322	118.673
26	42	Joe Nemechek	Team SABCO	Chevrolet	1:13.961	119.252
27	94	Bill Elliott	Elliott-Marino Racing	Ford	1:14.046	119.115
28	21	Michael Waltrip	Wood Brothers Racing	Ford	1:14.335	118.652
29	98	Rich Bickle	Cale Yarborough Motorsports	Ford	1:14.355	118.620
30	46	Tommy Kendall	Team SABCO	Chevrolet	1:14.399	118.550
31	12	Jeremy Mayfield	Penske-Kranefuss Racing	Ford	1:14.403	118.544
32	50	Ricky Craven	Hendrick Motorsports	Chevrolet	1:14.410	118.532
33	44	Kyle Petty	Petty Enterprises	Pontiac	1:14.490	118.405
34	1	Steve Park (R)	Dale Earnhardt, Inc.	Chevrolet	1:14.526	118.348
35	75	Rick Mast	Butch Mock Motorsports	Ford	1:14.631	118.181
36	11	Brett Bodine	Brett Bodine Racing	Ford	1:14.713	118.052
Provisionals
37	18	Bobby Labonte	Joe Gibbs Racing	Pontiac	-*	-*
38	97	Chad Little	Roush Racing	Ford	-*	-*
39	90	Dick Trickle	Donlavey Racing	Ford	-*	-*
40	41	Steve Grissom	Larry Hedrick Motorsports	Chevrolet	-*	-*
41	91	Morgan Shepherd	LJ Racing	Chevrolet	-*	-*
42	30	Derrike Cope	Bahari Racing	Pontiac	-*	-*
Champion's Provisional
43	35	Darrell Waltrip	Tyler Jet Motorsports	Chevrolet	-*	-*
Failed to qualify
44	71	Dave Marcis	Marcis Auto Racing	Chevrolet	1:15.364	117.032
45	59	Brian Cunningham	CSG Racing	Ford	1:15.688	116.531
46	58	Larry Gunselman	SBIII Motorsports	Ford	1:19.769	110.569
Official qualifying results

*Time not available.

== Race results ==
Fin	St	No.	Driver	Team	Make	Laps	Led	Status	Pts	Winnings
1	1	24	Jeff Gordon	Hendrick Motorsports	Chevrolet	90	55	running	185	$152,970
2	7	6	Mark Martin	Roush Racing	Ford	90	3	running	175	$65,820
3	23	31	Mike Skinner	Richard Childress Racing	Chevrolet	90	17	running	170	$53,085
4	6	2	Rusty Wallace	Penske-Kranefuss Racing	Ford	90	2	running	165	$47,050
5	10	88	Dale Jarrett	Robert Yates Racing	Ford	90	0	running	155	$52,980
6	33	44	Kyle Petty	Petty Enterprises	Pontiac	90	0	running	150	$44,565
7	13	40	Sterling Marlin	Team SABCO	Chevrolet	90	0	running	146	$30,185
8	17	43	John Andretti	Petty Enterprises	Pontiac	90	0	running	142	$39,560
9	21	26	Johnny Benson Jr.	Roush Racing	Ford	90	8	running	143	$33,930
10	37	18	Bobby Labonte	Joe Gibbs Racing	Pontiac	90	0	running	134	$45,090
11	22	3	Dale Earnhardt	Richard Childress Racing	Chevrolet	90	0	running	130	$36,355
12	26	42	Joe Nemechek	Team SABCO	Chevrolet	90	0	running	127	$32,215
13	14	4	Bobby Hamilton	Morgan–McClure Motorsports	Chevrolet	90	0	running	124	$36,225
14	3	10	Ricky Rudd	Rudd Performance Motorsports	Ford	90	0	running	121	$36,610
15	8	9	Jerry Nadeau (R)	Melling Racing	Ford	90	0	running	118	$26,795
16	38	97	Chad Little	Roush Racing	Ford	90	0	running	115	$24,900
17	30	46	Tommy Kendall	Team SABCO	Chevrolet	90	0	running	112	$19,405
18	34	1	Steve Park (R)	Dale Earnhardt, Inc.	Chevrolet	90	0	running	109	$23,260
19	15	16	Ted Musgrave	Roush Racing	Ford	90	0	running	106	$30,080
20	5	23	Jimmy Spencer	Travis Carter Enterprises	Ford	90	5	running	108	$33,810
21	25	22	Ward Burton	Bill Davis Racing	Pontiac	90	0	running	100	$29,430
22	29	98	Rich Bickle	Cale Yarborough Motorsports	Ford	90	0	running	97	$25,700
23	4	99	Jeff Burton	Roush Racing	Ford	90	0	running	94	$35,195
24	16	33	Ken Schrader	Andy Petree Racing	Chevrolet	90	0	running	91	$29,625
25	43	35	Darrell Waltrip	Tyler Jet Motorsports	Chevrolet	90	0	running	88	$18,480
26	19	81	Kenny Wallace	FILMAR Racing	Ford	90	0	running	85	$22,810
27	27	94	Bill Elliott	Elliott-Marino Racing	Ford	89	0	out of gas	82	$28,590
28	28	21	Michael Waltrip	Wood Brothers Racing	Ford	89	0	out of gas	79	$28,420
29	24	77	Robert Pressley	Jasper Motorsports	Ford	89	0	running	76	$21,750
30	35	75	Rick Mast	Butch Mock Motorsports	Ford	89	0	running	73	$21,075
31	31	12	Jeremy Mayfield	Penske-Kranefuss Racing	Ford	89	0	running	70	$28,010
32	11	7	Geoff Bodine	Mattei Motorsports	Ford	89	0	running	67	$27,435
33	9	36	Ernie Irvan	MB2 Motorsports	Pontiac	89	0	running	64	$24,875
34	36	11	Brett Bodine	Brett Bodine Racing	Ford	89	0	running	61	$24,840
35	32	50	Ricky Craven	Hendrick Motorsports	Chevrolet	89	0	running	58	$24,805
36	20	13	Tom Hubert	Elliott-Marino Racing	Ford	88	0	running	55	$17,745
37	18	28	Kenny Irwin Jr. (R)	Robert Yates Racing	Ford	88	0	running	52	$32,710
38	40	41	Steve Grissom	Larry Hedrick Motorsports	Chevrolet	88	0	running	49	$24,675
39	42	30	Derrike Cope	Bahari Racing	Pontiac	87	0	running	46	$24,665
40	12	5	Terry Labonte	Hendrick Motorsports	Chevrolet	80	0	running	43	$33,655
41	39	90	Dick Trickle	Donlavey Racing	Ford	77	0	engine	40	$24,645
42	2	96	Ron Fellows	American Equipment Racing	Chevrolet	69	0	running	37	$20,135
43	41	91	Morgan Shepherd	LJ Racing	Chevrolet	47	0	transmission	34	$17,625
Official race results

Previous race: 1998 Brickyard 400	NASCAR Winston Cup Series; 1998 season	Next race: 1998 Pepsi 400 presented by DeVilbiss
