= 1998 Farm Aid on CMT 300 =

23rd race of the 1998 NASCAR Winston Cup Series

Race details
- Race 23 of 33 in the 1998 NASCAR Winston Cup Series
- The 1998 Farm Aid on CMT 300 program cover.
- Date: August 30, 1998
- Location: Loudon, New Hampshire, New Hampshire International Speedway
- Course: Permanent racing facility
- Course length: 1.058 miles (1.703 km)
- Distance: 300 laps, 317.4 mi (510.805 km)
- Average speed: 112.078 miles per hour (180.372 km/h)

Pole position
Driver	Jeff Gordon	Hendrick Motorsports
- Time: 29.518

Most laps led
Driver	Mark Martin	Roush Racing
- Laps: 193

Winner
No. 24	Jeff Gordon	Hendrick Motorsports

Television in the United States
- Network: TNN
- Announcers: Ken Squier, Dick Berggren, Buddy Baker

Radio in the United States
- Radio: Motor Racing Network

The 1998 Farm Aid on CMT 300 was the 23rd stock car race of the 1998 NASCAR Winston Cup Series season and the second iteration of the event. The race was held on Sunday, August 30, 1998, in Loudon, New Hampshire, at New Hampshire International Speedway, a 1.058-mile (1.703 km) permanent, oval-shaped, low-banked racetrack. The race took the scheduled 300 laps to complete. At race's end, Hendrick Motorsports driver Jeff Gordon would manage to dominate the final laps of the race to take his 38th career NASCAR Winston Cup Series victory and his eighth victory of the season. To fill out the podium, Roush Racing driver Mark Martin and Petty Enterprises driver John Andretti would finish second and third, respectively.

== Background ==
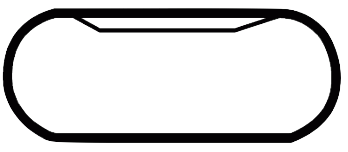
The layout of New Hampshire International Speedway, the venue where the race was held.

New Hampshire International Speedway is a 1.058-mile (1.703 km) oval speedway located in Loudon, New Hampshire which has hosted NASCAR racing annually since the early 1990s, as well as an IndyCar weekend and the oldest motorcycle race in North America, the Loudon Classic. Nicknamed "The Magic Mile", the speedway is often converted into a 1.6-mile (2.6 km) road course, which includes much of the oval. The track was originally the site of Bryar Motorsports Park before being purchased and redeveloped by Bob Bahre. The track is currently one of eight major NASCAR tracks owned and operated by Speedway Motorsports.

=== Entry list ===
- (R) denotes rookie driver.

#	Driver	Team	Make
00	Buckshot Jones	Stavola Brothers Racing	Chevrolet
1	Steve Park (R)	Dale Earnhardt, Inc.	Chevrolet
2	Rusty Wallace	Penske-Kranefuss Racing	Ford
3	Dale Earnhardt	Richard Childress Racing	Chevrolet
4	Bobby Hamilton	Morgan–McClure Motorsports	Chevrolet
5	Terry Labonte	Hendrick Motorsports	Chevrolet
6	Mark Martin	Roush Racing	Ford
7	Geoff Bodine	Mattei Motorsports	Ford
07	Dan Pardus	Midwest Transit Racing	Chevrolet
9	Jerry Nadeau (R)	Melling Racing	Ford
10	Ricky Rudd	Rudd Performance Motorsports	Ford
11	Brett Bodine	Brett Bodine Racing	Ford
12	Jeremy Mayfield	Penske-Kranefuss Racing	Ford
13	Dennis Setzer	Elliott-Marino Racing	Ford
16	Kevin Lepage (R)	Roush Racing	Ford
18	Bobby Labonte	Joe Gibbs Racing	Pontiac
21	Michael Waltrip	Wood Brothers Racing	Ford
22	Ward Burton	Bill Davis Racing	Pontiac
23	Jimmy Spencer	Travis Carter Enterprises	Ford
24	Jeff Gordon	Hendrick Motorsports	Chevrolet
26	Johnny Benson Jr.	Roush Racing	Ford
28	Kenny Irwin Jr. (R)	Robert Yates Racing	Ford
30	Derrike Cope	Bahari Racing	Pontiac
31	Mike Skinner	Richard Childress Racing	Chevrolet
33	Ken Schrader	Andy Petree Racing	Chevrolet
35	Darrell Waltrip	Tyler Jet Motorsports	Pontiac
36	Ernie Irvan	MB2 Motorsports	Pontiac
40	Sterling Marlin	Team SABCO	Chevrolet
41	Steve Grissom	Larry Hedrick Motorsports	Chevrolet
42	Joe Nemechek	Team SABCO	Chevrolet
43	John Andretti	Petty Enterprises	Pontiac
44	Kyle Petty	Petty Enterprises	Pontiac
46	Jeff Green	Team SABCO	Chevrolet
50	Wally Dallenbach Jr.	Hendrick Motorsports	Chevrolet
71	Dave Marcis	Marcis Auto Racing	Chevrolet
75	Rick Mast	Butch Mock Motorsports	Ford
77	Robert Pressley	Jasper Motorsports	Ford
79	Ken Bouchard	T.R.I.X. Racing	Chevrolet
81	Kenny Wallace	FILMAR Racing	Ford
88	Dale Jarrett	Robert Yates Racing	Ford
90	Dick Trickle	Donlavey Racing	Ford
91	Morgan Shepherd	LJ Racing	Chevrolet
94	Bill Elliott	Elliott-Marino Racing	Ford
96	Ron Fellows	American Equipment Racing	Chevrolet
97	Chad Little	Roush Racing	Ford
98	Rich Bickle	Cale Yarborough Motorsports	Ford
99	Jeff Burton	Roush Racing	Ford

== Practice ==
=== First practice ===
The first practice session was held on Friday, August 28, at 2:00 PM EST. The session would last for one hour. Jeremy Mayfield, driving for Penske-Kranefuss Racing, would set the fastest time in the session, with a lap of 29.815 and an average speed of 127.748 mph (205.590 km/h).

Pos.	#	Driver	Team	Make	Time	Speed
1	12	Jeremy Mayfield	Penske-Kranefuss Racing	Ford	29.815	127.748
2	6	Mark Martin	Roush Racing	Ford	29.853	127.585
3	33	Ken Schrader	Andy Petree Racing	Chevrolet	29.900	127.385
Full first practice results

== Qualifying ==
Qualifying was split into two rounds. The first round was held on Friday, August 28, at 4:00 PM EST. Each driver would have one lap to set a time. During the first round, the top 25 drivers in the round would be guaranteed a starting spot in the race. If a driver was not able to guarantee a spot in the first round, they had the option to scrub their time from the first round and try and run a faster lap time in a second round qualifying run, held on Saturday, August 29, at 11:00 AM EST. As with the first round, each driver would have one lap to set a time. On January 24, 1998, NASCAR would announce that the amount of provisionals given would be increased from last season. Positions 26-36 would be decided on time, while positions 37-43 would be based on provisionals. Six spots are awarded by the use of provisionals based on owner's points. The seventh is awarded to a past champion who has not otherwise qualified for the race. If no past champion needs the provisional, the next team in the owner points will be awarded a provisional.

Jeff Gordon, driving for Hendrick Motorsports, would win the pole, setting a time of 29.518 and an average speed of 129.033 miles per hour (207.658 km/h).

Three drivers would fail to qualify: Derrike Cope, Buckshot Jones, and Dan Pardus.

=== Full qualifying results ===
Pos.	#	Driver	Team	Make	Time	Speed
1	24	Jeff Gordon	Hendrick Motorsports	Chevrolet	29.518	129.033
2	18	Bobby Labonte	Joe Gibbs Racing	Pontiac	29.664	128.398
3	33	Ken Schrader	Andy Petree Racing	Chevrolet	29.707	128.212
4	81	Kenny Wallace	FILMAR Racing	Ford	29.714	128.182
5	6	Mark Martin	Roush Racing	Ford	29.738	128.079
6	12	Jeremy Mayfield	Penske-Kranefuss Racing	Ford	29.756	128.001
7	88	Dale Jarrett	Robert Yates Racing	Ford	29.813	127.756
8	75	Rick Mast	Butch Mock Motorsports	Ford	29.814	127.752
9	43	John Andretti	Petty Enterprises	Pontiac	29.839	127.645
10	4	Bobby Hamilton	Morgan–McClure Motorsports	Chevrolet	29.859	127.560
11	28	Kenny Irwin Jr. (R)	Robert Yates Racing	Ford	29.875	127.491
12	31	Mike Skinner	Richard Childress Racing	Chevrolet	29.908	127.351
13	5	Terry Labonte	Hendrick Motorsports	Chevrolet	29.967	127.100
14	2	Rusty Wallace	Penske-Kranefuss Racing	Ford	29.969	127.091
15	41	Steve Grissom	Larry Hedrick Motorsports	Chevrolet	29.971	127.083
16	11	Brett Bodine	Brett Bodine Racing	Ford	29.976	127.062
17	23	Jimmy Spencer	Travis Carter Enterprises	Ford	29.982	127.036
18	3	Dale Earnhardt	Richard Childress Racing	Chevrolet	29.990	127.002
19	36	Ernie Irvan	MB2 Motorsports	Pontiac	30.010	126.918
20	22	Ward Burton	Bill Davis Racing	Pontiac	30.013	126.905
21	46	Jeff Green	Team SABCO	Chevrolet	30.021	126.871
22	94	Bill Elliott	Elliott-Marino Racing	Ford	30.041	126.787
23	44	Kyle Petty	Petty Enterprises	Pontiac	30.054	126.732
24	77	Robert Pressley	Jasper Motorsports	Ford	30.064	126.690
25	99	Jeff Burton	Roush Racing	Ford	30.067	126.677
26	9	Jerry Nadeau (R)	Melling Racing	Ford	29.864	127.538
27	97	Chad Little	Roush Racing	Ford	29.865	127.534
28	90	Dick Trickle	Donlavey Racing	Ford	29.866	127.530
29	21	Michael Waltrip	Wood Brothers Racing	Ford	29.873	127.500
30	91	Morgan Shepherd	LJ Racing	Chevrolet	29.900	127.385
31	7	Geoff Bodine	Mattei Motorsports	Ford	29.976	127.062
32	42	Joe Nemechek	Team SABCO	Chevrolet	30.003	126.947
33	16	Kevin Lepage	Roush Racing	Ford	30.011	126.913
34	13	Dennis Setzer	Elliott-Marino Racing	Ford	30.022	126.867
35	10	Ricky Rudd	Rudd Performance Motorsports	Ford	30.105	126.517
36	50	Wally Dallenbach Jr.	Hendrick Motorsports	Chevrolet	30.145	126.349
Provisionals
37	40	Sterling Marlin (R)	Team SABCO	Chevrolet	-*	-*
38	26	Johnny Benson Jr.	Roush Racing	Ford	-*	-*
39	1	Steve Park (R)	Dale Earnhardt, Inc.	Chevrolet	-*	-*
40	98	Rich Bickle	Cale Yarborough Motorsports	Ford	-*	-*
41	96	Ron Fellows	American Equipment Racing	Chevrolet	-*	-*
42	71	Dave Marcis	Marcis Auto Racing	Chevrolet	-*	-*
Champion's Provisional
43	35	Darrell Waltrip	Tyler Jet Motorsports	Pontiac	-*	-*
Failed to qualify
44	30	Derrike Cope	Bahari Racing	Pontiac	30.274	125.811
45	00	Buckshot Jones	Stavola Brothers Racing	Chevrolet	30.548	124.682
46	07	Dan Pardus	Midwest Transit Racing	Chevrolet	-	-
WD	79	Ken Bouchard	T.R.I.X. Racing	Chevrolet	-	-
Official qualifying results

== Race results ==
Fin	St	#	Driver	Team	Make	Laps	Led	Status	Pts	Winnings
1	1	24	Jeff Gordon	Hendrick Motorsports	Chevrolet	300	68	running	180	$205,400
2	5	6	Mark Martin	Roush Racing	Ford	300	193	running	180	$119,750
3	9	43	John Andretti	Petty Enterprises	Pontiac	300	0	running	165	$87,300
4	7	88	Dale Jarrett	Robert Yates Racing	Ford	300	2	running	165	$78,875
5	25	99	Jeff Burton	Roush Racing	Ford	300	0	running	155	$66,700
6	4	81	Kenny Wallace	FILMAR Racing	Ford	300	30	running	155	$52,900
7	2	18	Bobby Labonte	Joe Gibbs Racing	Pontiac	300	1	running	151	$57,350
8	14	2	Rusty Wallace	Penske-Kranefuss Racing	Ford	300	0	running	142	$51,350
9	18	3	Dale Earnhardt	Richard Childress Racing	Chevrolet	300	0	running	138	$50,550
10	35	10	Ricky Rudd	Rudd Performance Motorsports	Ford	300	0	running	134	$59,500
11	11	28	Kenny Irwin Jr. (R)	Robert Yates Racing	Ford	300	0	running	130	$51,350
12	24	77	Robert Pressley	Jasper Motorsports	Ford	300	0	running	127	$39,650
13	17	23	Jimmy Spencer	Travis Carter Enterprises	Ford	300	0	running	124	$44,900
14	27	97	Chad Little	Roush Racing	Ford	300	1	running	126	$36,650
15	12	31	Mike Skinner	Richard Childress Racing	Chevrolet	300	0	running	118	$37,600
16	33	16	Kevin Lepage	Roush Racing	Ford	300	0	running	115	$42,550
17	37	40	Sterling Marlin (R)	Team SABCO	Chevrolet	300	0	running	112	$34,525
18	32	42	Joe Nemechek	Team SABCO	Chevrolet	300	0	running	109	$40,825
19	28	90	Dick Trickle	Donlavey Racing	Ford	300	0	running	106	$40,425
20	6	12	Jeremy Mayfield	Penske-Kranefuss Racing	Ford	299	0	running	103	$41,225
21	38	26	Johnny Benson Jr.	Roush Racing	Ford	299	0	running	100	$40,850
22	8	75	Rick Mast	Butch Mock Motorsports	Ford	299	0	running	97	$32,500
23	31	7	Geoff Bodine	Mattei Motorsports	Ford	299	0	running	94	$40,100
24	34	13	Dennis Setzer	Elliott-Marino Racing	Ford	299	0	running	91	$28,600
25	15	41	Steve Grissom	Larry Hedrick Motorsports	Chevrolet	299	0	running	88	$38,700
26	30	91	Morgan Shepherd	LJ Racing	Chevrolet	299	0	running	85	$32,000
27	29	21	Michael Waltrip	Wood Brothers Racing	Ford	299	0	running	82	$38,075
28	19	36	Ernie Irvan	MB2 Motorsports	Pontiac	298	0	running	79	$37,775
29	26	9	Jerry Nadeau (R)	Melling Racing	Ford	298	0	running	76	$31,575
30	16	11	Brett Bodine	Brett Bodine Racing	Ford	298	0	running	73	$36,875
31	20	22	Ward Burton	Bill Davis Racing	Pontiac	298	0	running	70	$34,175
32	43	35	Darrell Waltrip	Tyler Jet Motorsports	Pontiac	297	0	running	67	$26,975
33	23	44	Kyle Petty	Petty Enterprises	Pontiac	295	0	running	64	$33,775
34	10	4	Bobby Hamilton	Morgan–McClure Motorsports	Chevrolet	293	0	running	61	$41,575
35	42	71	Dave Marcis	Marcis Auto Racing	Chevrolet	286	2	running	63	$26,375
36	41	96	Ron Fellows	American Equipment Racing	Chevrolet	286	0	running	55	$26,175
37	22	94	Bill Elliott	Elliott-Marino Racing	Ford	254	0	running	52	$32,975
38	21	46	Jeff Green	Team SABCO	Chevrolet	252	0	crash	49	$25,625
39	13	5	Terry Labonte	Hendrick Motorsports	Chevrolet	249	2	engine	51	$41,625
40	40	98	Rich Bickle	Cale Yarborough Motorsports	Ford	232	0	crash	43	$32,625
41	39	1	Steve Park (R)	Dale Earnhardt, Inc.	Chevrolet	218	0	running	40	$25,625
42	3	33	Ken Schrader	Andy Petree Racing	Chevrolet	175	1	crash	42	$36,625
43	36	50	Wally Dallenbach Jr.	Hendrick Motorsports	Chevrolet	169	0	engine	34	$36,625
Official race results

Previous race: 1998 Goody's Headache Powder 500 (Bristol)	NASCAR Winston Cup Series; 1998 season	Next race: 1998 Pepsi Southern 500
