= 1998 Pepsi 400 presented by DeVilbiss =

21st race of the 1998 NASCAR Winston Cup Series

Race details
- Race 21 of 33 in the 1998 NASCAR Winston Cup Series
- The 1998 Pepsi 400 presented by DeVilbiss program cover, featuring Mark Martin.
- Date: August 16, 1998
- Official name: 29th Annual Pepsi 400 presented by DeVilbiss
- Location: Brooklyn, Michigan, Michigan International Speedway
- Course: Permanent racing facility
- Course length: 2 miles (3.2 km)
- Distance: 200 laps, 400 mi (643.737 km)
- Average speed: 151.995 miles per hour (244.612 km/h)

Pole position
Driver	Ernie Irvan	MB2 Motorsports
- Time: 39.255

Most laps led
Driver	Ernie Irvan	MB2 Motorsports
- Laps: 115

Winner
No. 24	Jeff Gordon	Hendrick Motorsports

Television in the United States
- Network: NASCAR on ESPN
- Announcers: Bob Jenkins, Ned Jarrett, Benny Parsons

Radio in the United States
- Radio: Motor Racing Network

The 1998 Pepsi 400 presented by DeVilbiss was the 21st stock car race of the 1998 NASCAR Winston Cup Series season and the 29th iteration of the event. The race was held on Sunday, August 16, 1998, in Brooklyn, Michigan, at Michigan International Speedway, a two-mile (3.2 km) moderate-banked D-shaped speedway. The race took the scheduled 200 laps to complete. Within the closing laps of the race, Hendrick Motorsports driver Jeff Gordon was able to take the lead with ten to go to take his 37th career NASCAR Winston Cup Series victory, his eighth of the season, and his fourth consecutive victory up to that point. To fill out the podium, Joe Gibbs Racing driver Bobby Labonte and Robert Yates Racing driver Dale Jarrett would finish second and third, respectively.

== Background ==
The layout of Michigan International Speedway, the venue where the race was held.

The race was held at Michigan International Speedway, a two-mile (3.2 km) moderate-banked D-shaped speedway located in Brooklyn, Michigan. The track is used primarily for NASCAR events. The track is owned by NASCAR. MIS is recognized as one of motorsports' premier facilities because of its wide racing surface and high banking (by open-wheel standards; the 18-degree banking is modest by stock car standards).

=== Entry list ===
- (R) denotes rookie driver.

#	Driver	Team	Make
00	Buckshot Jones	Stavola Brothers Racing	Chevrolet
1	Steve Park (R)	Dale Earnhardt, Inc.	Chevrolet
2	Rusty Wallace	Penske-Kranefuss Racing	Ford
3	Dale Earnhardt	Richard Childress Racing	Chevrolet
4	Bobby Hamilton	Morgan–McClure Motorsports	Chevrolet
5	Terry Labonte	Hendrick Motorsports	Chevrolet
6	Mark Martin	Roush Racing	Ford
7	Geoff Bodine	Mattei Motorsports	Ford
9	Jerry Nadeau (R)	Melling Racing	Ford
10	Ricky Rudd	Rudd Performance Motorsports	Ford
11	Brett Bodine	Brett Bodine Racing	Ford
12	Jeremy Mayfield	Penske-Kranefuss Racing	Ford
13	Dennis Setzer	Elliott-Marino Racing	Ford
15	Ted Musgrave	Moore-Robinson Motorsports	Ford
16	Kevin Lepage (R)	Roush Racing	Ford
18	Bobby Labonte	Joe Gibbs Racing	Pontiac
21	Michael Waltrip	Wood Brothers Racing	Ford
22	Ward Burton	Bill Davis Racing	Pontiac
23	Jimmy Spencer*	Haas-Carter Motorsports	Ford
24	Jeff Gordon	Hendrick Motorsports	Chevrolet
26	Johnny Benson Jr.	Roush Racing	Ford
28	Kenny Irwin Jr. (R)	Robert Yates Racing	Ford
30	Derrike Cope	Bahari Racing	Pontiac
31	Mike Skinner	Richard Childress Racing	Chevrolet
33	Ken Schrader	Andy Petree Racing	Chevrolet
35	Darrell Waltrip	Tyler Jet Motorsports	Pontiac
36	Ernie Irvan	MB2 Motorsports	Pontiac
40	Sterling Marlin	Team SABCO	Chevrolet
41	Steve Grissom	Larry Hedrick Motorsports	Chevrolet
42	Joe Nemechek	Team SABCO	Chevrolet
43	John Andretti	Petty Enterprises	Pontiac
44	Kyle Petty	Petty Enterprises	Pontiac
46	Jeff Green	Team SABCO	Chevrolet
50	Wally Dallenbach Jr.	Hendrick Motorsports	Chevrolet
71	Dave Marcis	Marcis Auto Racing	Chevrolet
75	Rick Mast	Butch Mock Motorsports	Ford
77	Robert Pressley	Jasper Motorsports	Ford
78	Gary Bradberry	Triad Motorsports	Ford
81	Kenny Wallace	FILMAR Racing	Ford
88	Dale Jarrett	Robert Yates Racing	Ford
90	Dick Trickle	Donlavey Racing	Ford
91	Morgan Shepherd	LJ Racing	Chevrolet
94	Bill Elliott	Elliott-Marino Racing	Ford
96	Hut Stricklin	American Equipment Racing	Chevrolet
97	Chad Little	Roush Racing	Ford
98	Rich Bickle	Cale Yarborough Motorsports	Ford
99	Jeff Burton	Roush Racing	Ford

*Driver changed to Frank Kimmel after suffering a concussion at the 1998 Brickyard 400.

== Practice ==
=== First practice ===
The first practice session was held on Friday, August 14. Ernie Irvan, driving for MB2 Motorsports, would set the fastest time in the session, with a lap of 39.132 and an average speed of 183.993 mph (296.108 km/h).

Pos.	#	Driver	Team	Make	Time	Speed
1	36	Ernie Irvan	MB2 Motorsports	Pontiac	39.132	183.993
2	18	Bobby Labonte	Joe Gibbs Racing	Pontiac	39.190	183.720
3	33	Ken Schrader	Andy Petree Racing	Chevrolet	39.223	183.566
Full first practice results

=== Final practice ===
The final practice session, sometimes referred to as Happy Hour, was held on Saturday, August 15. Mark Martin, driving for Roush Racing, would set the fastest time in the session, with a lap of 40.159 and an average speed of 179.287 mph (288.534 km/h).

Pos.	#	Driver	Team	Make	Time	Speed
1	6	Mark Martin	Roush Racing	Ford	40.159	179.287
2	99	Jeff Burton	Roush Racing	Ford	40.472	177.901
3	88	Dale Jarrett	Robert Yates Racing	Ford	40.507	177.747
Full Happy Hour practice results

== Qualifying ==
Qualifying was split into two rounds. The first round was held on Friday, August 14, at 3:00 PM EST. Each driver would have one lap to set a time. During the first round, the top 25 drivers in the round would be guaranteed a starting spot in the race. If a driver was not able to guarantee a spot in the first round, they had the option to scrub their time from the first round and try and run a faster lap time in a second round qualifying run, held on Saturday, August 15, at 10:45 AM EST. As with the first round, each driver would have one lap to set a time. On January 24, 1998, NASCAR would announce that the amount of provisionals given would be increased from last season. Positions 26-36 would be decided on time, while positions 37-43 would be based on provisionals. Six spots are awarded by the use of provisionals based on owner's points. The seventh is awarded to a past champion who has not otherwise qualified for the race. If no past champion needs the provisional, the next team in the owner points will be awarded a provisional.

Ernie Irvan, driving for MB2 Motorsports, would win the pole, setting a time of 39.255 and an average speed of 183.416 miles per hour (295.179 km/h).

Four drivers would fail to qualify: Dave Marcis, Kenny Wallace, Gary Bradberry, and Hut Stricklin.

=== Full qualifying results ===
Pos.	#	Driver	Team	Make	Time	Speed
1	36	Ernie Irvan	MB2 Motorsports	Pontiac	39.255	183.416
2	18	Bobby Labonte	Joe Gibbs Racing	Pontiac	39.264	183.374
3	24	Jeff Gordon	Hendrick Motorsports	Chevrolet	39.271	183.341
4	88	Dale Jarrett	Robert Yates Racing	Ford	39.316	183.132
5	6	Mark Martin	Roush Racing	Ford	39.389	182.792
6	42	Joe Nemechek	Team SABCO	Chevrolet	39.408	182.704
7	50	Wally Dallenbach Jr.	Hendrick Motorsports	Chevrolet	39.433	182.588
8	12	Jeremy Mayfield	Penske-Kranefuss Racing	Ford	39.440	182.556
9	22	Ward Burton	Bill Davis Racing	Pontiac	39.469	182.422
10	33	Ken Schrader	Andy Petree Racing	Chevrolet	39.478	182.380
11	2	Rusty Wallace	Penske-Kranefuss Racing	Ford	39.499	182.283
12	98	Rich Bickle	Cale Yarborough Motorsports	Ford	39.606	181.791
13	5	Terry Labonte	Hendrick Motorsports	Chevrolet	39.631	181.676
14	30	Derrike Cope	Bahari Racing	Pontiac	39.632	181.671
15	43	John Andretti	Petty Enterprises	Pontiac	39.650	181.589
16	91	Morgan Shepherd	LJ Racing	Chevrolet	39.652	181.580
17	94	Bill Elliott	Elliott-Marino Racing	Ford	39.682	181.442
18	28	Kenny Irwin Jr. (R)	Robert Yates Racing	Ford	39.686	181.424
19	10	Ricky Rudd	Rudd Performance Motorsports	Ford	39.699	181.365
20	40	Sterling Marlin	Team SABCO	Chevrolet	39.705	181.337
21	1	Steve Park (R)	Dale Earnhardt, Inc.	Chevrolet	39.735	181.200
22	9	Jerry Nadeau (R)	Melling Racing	Ford	39.750	181.132
23	7	Geoff Bodine	Mattei Motorsports	Ford	39.780	180.995
24	4	Bobby Hamilton	Morgan–McClure Motorsports	Chevrolet	39.791	180.945
25	99	Jeff Burton	Roush Racing	Ford	39.796	180.923
26	31	Mike Skinner	Richard Childress Racing	Chevrolet	39.797	180.918
27	44	Kyle Petty	Petty Enterprises	Pontiac	39.820	180.814
28	13	Dennis Setzer	Elliott-Marino Racing	Ford	39.887	180.510
29	90	Dick Trickle	Donlavey Racing	Ford	39.892	180.487
30	21	Michael Waltrip	Wood Brothers Racing	Ford	39.904	180.433
31	75	Rick Mast	Butch Mock Motorsports	Ford	39.907	180.419
32	15	Ted Musgrave	Moore-Robinson Motorsports	Ford	39.951	180.221
33	77	Robert Pressley	Jasper Motorsports	Ford	39.960	180.180
34	00	Buckshot Jones	Stavola Brothers Racing	Chevrolet	40.001	179.996
35	46	Jeff Green	Team SABCO	Chevrolet	40.026	179.883
36	23	Frank Kimmel	Travis Carter Enterprises	Ford	40.058	179.739
Provisionals
37	3	Dale Earnhardt	Richard Childress Racing	Chevrolet	-*	-*
38	26	Johnny Benson Jr.	Roush Racing	Ford	-*	-*
39	16	Kevin Lepage (R)	Roush Racing	Ford	-*	-*
40	97	Chad Little	Roush Racing	Ford	-*	-*
41	11	Brett Bodine	Brett Bodine Racing	Ford	-*	-*
42	41	Steve Grissom	Larry Hedrick Motorsports	Chevrolet	-*	-*
Champion's Provisional
43	35	Darrell Waltrip	Tyler Jet Motorsports	Pontiac	-*	-*
Failed to qualify
44	71	Dave Marcis	Marcis Auto Racing	Chevrolet	40.067	179.699
45	81	Kenny Wallace	FILMAR Racing	Ford	40.138	179.381
46	78	Gary Bradberry	Triad Motorsports	Ford	40.257	178.851
47	96	Hut Stricklin	American Equipment Racing	Chevrolet	40.421	178.125
Official qualifying results

== Race results ==
Fin	St	#	Driver	Team	Make	Laps	Led	Status	Pts	Winnings
1	3	24	Jeff Gordon	Hendrick Motorsports	Chevrolet	200	9	running	180	$120,302
2	2	18	Bobby Labonte	Joe Gibbs Racing	Pontiac	200	5	running	175	$73,555
3	4	88	Dale Jarrett	Robert Yates Racing	Ford	200	6	running	170	$61,805
4	5	6	Mark Martin	Roush Racing	Ford	200	57	running	165	$53,525
5	25	99	Jeff Burton	Roush Racing	Ford	200	0	running	155	$48,390
6	1	36	Ernie Irvan	MB2 Motorsports	Pontiac	200	115	running	160	$64,840
7	8	12	Jeremy Mayfield	Penske-Kranefuss Racing	Ford	200	0	running	146	$37,515
8	7	50	Wally Dallenbach Jr.	Hendrick Motorsports	Chevrolet	200	0	running	142	$39,065
9	15	43	John Andretti	Petty Enterprises	Pontiac	200	0	running	138	$42,815
10	40	97	Chad Little	Roush Racing	Ford	199	2	running	139	$38,565
11	21	1	Steve Park (R)	Dale Earnhardt, Inc.	Chevrolet	199	0	running	130	$28,090
12	6	42	Joe Nemechek	Team SABCO	Chevrolet	199	0	running	127	$33,140
13	19	10	Ricky Rudd	Rudd Performance Motorsports	Ford	199	0	running	124	$39,490
14	10	33	Ken Schrader	Andy Petree Racing	Chevrolet	199	0	running	121	$33,690
15	20	40	Sterling Marlin	Team SABCO	Chevrolet	199	0	running	118	$25,740
16	18	28	Kenny Irwin Jr. (R)	Robert Yates Racing	Ford	198	0	running	115	$38,190
17	39	16	Kevin Lepage (R)	Roush Racing	Ford	198	0	running	112	$31,140
18	37	3	Dale Earnhardt	Richard Childress Racing	Chevrolet	198	3	running	114	$34,840
19	26	31	Mike Skinner	Richard Childress Racing	Chevrolet	198	0	running	106	$23,340
20	24	4	Bobby Hamilton	Morgan–McClure Motorsports	Chevrolet	198	0	running	103	$36,590
21	23	7	Geoff Bodine	Mattei Motorsports	Ford	198	0	running	100	$30,390
22	30	21	Michael Waltrip	Wood Brothers Racing	Ford	198	0	running	97	$29,590
23	11	2	Rusty Wallace	Penske-Kranefuss Racing	Ford	198	0	running	94	$33,965
24	33	77	Robert Pressley	Jasper Motorsports	Ford	198	0	running	91	$23,265
25	43	35	Darrell Waltrip	Tyler Jet Motorsports	Pontiac	198	2	running	93	$18,715
26	31	75	Rick Mast	Butch Mock Motorsports	Ford	198	0	running	85	$22,315
27	34	00	Buckshot Jones	Stavola Brothers Racing	Chevrolet	197	0	running	82	$18,440
28	12	98	Rich Bickle	Cale Yarborough Motorsports	Ford	197	0	running	79	$25,390
29	27	44	Kyle Petty	Petty Enterprises	Pontiac	197	0	running	76	$28,490
30	22	9	Jerry Nadeau (R)	Melling Racing	Ford	197	0	running	73	$21,340
31	36	23	Frank Kimmel	Travis Carter Enterprises	Ford	197	0	running	70	$28,065
32	41	11	Brett Bodine	Brett Bodine Racing	Ford	197	0	running	67	$28,015
33	42	41	Steve Grissom	Larry Hedrick Motorsports	Chevrolet	197	0	running	64	$27,465
34	38	26	Johnny Benson Jr.	Roush Racing	Ford	194	0	running	61	$24,915
35	28	13	Dennis Setzer	Elliott-Marino Racing	Ford	194	0	running	58	$18,365
36	13	5	Terry Labonte	Hendrick Motorsports	Chevrolet	187	1	engine	60	$33,840
37	9	22	Ward Burton	Bill Davis Racing	Pontiac	177	0	engine	52	$24,815
38	29	90	Dick Trickle	Donlavey Racing	Ford	160	0	engine	49	$24,740
39	32	15	Ted Musgrave	Moore-Robinson Motorsports	Ford	136	0	engine	46	$17,740
40	17	94	Bill Elliott	Elliott-Marino Racing	Ford	132	0	engine	43	$24,740
41	35	46	Jeff Green	Team SABCO	Chevrolet	17	0	accident	40	$17,740
42	16	91	Morgan Shepherd	LJ Racing	Chevrolet	15	0	accident	37	$20,240
43	14	30	Derrike Cope	Bahari Racing	Pontiac	7	0	accident	34	$24,740
Official race results

Previous race: 1998 The Bud at The Glen	NASCAR Winston Cup Series; 1998 season	Next race: 1998 Goody's Headache Powder 500 (Bristol)
