= 2000 Bud Shootout =

First exhibition race of the 2000 NASCAR Winston Cup Series

Race details
- Race 1 of 2 exhibition races in the 2000 NASCAR Winston Cup Series
- Date: February 13, 2000
- Location: Daytona International Speedway, Daytona Beach, Florida
- Course: Permanent racing facility
- Course length: 2.5 miles (4 km)
- Distance: 25 laps, 62.5 mi (100.584 km)
- Average speed: 182.334 mph (293.438 km/h)

Pole position
Driver	Mark Martin	Roush Racing
- Time: N/A

Most laps led
Driver	Sterling Marlin	Team SABCO
- Laps: 13

Winner
No. 88	Dale Jarrett	Robert Yates Racing

Television in the United States
- Network: CBS
- Announcers: Mike Joy, Buddy Baker, Ned Jarrett

The 2000 Bud Shootout was the first of two exhibition stock car races of the 2000 NASCAR Winston Cup Series, and the 22nd running of the Bud Shootout. The race was held on February 13, 2000, in Daytona Beach, Florida, at Daytona International Speedway. Dale Jarrett, driving for Robert Yates Racing, won the 25-lap race, marking his second win in the event. Hendrick Motorsports driver Jeff Gordon finished second and Team SABCO driver Sterling Marlin finished third.

Mark Martin, the race's pole sitter, was swallowed up by the pack on the backstretch of the first lap and gave up the lead to Gordon, who led the first nine laps of the race. Gordon conceded the lead to Bobby Labonte on the tenth lap, due to the mandatory pit stop. After Labonte made his mandatory pit stop, Marlin overtook the race lead on lap 12 and maintained it until the final lap, during which he was passed for the race win by Jarrett. There were four lead changes amongst four different drivers, and no cautions were issued during the race.

== Background ==
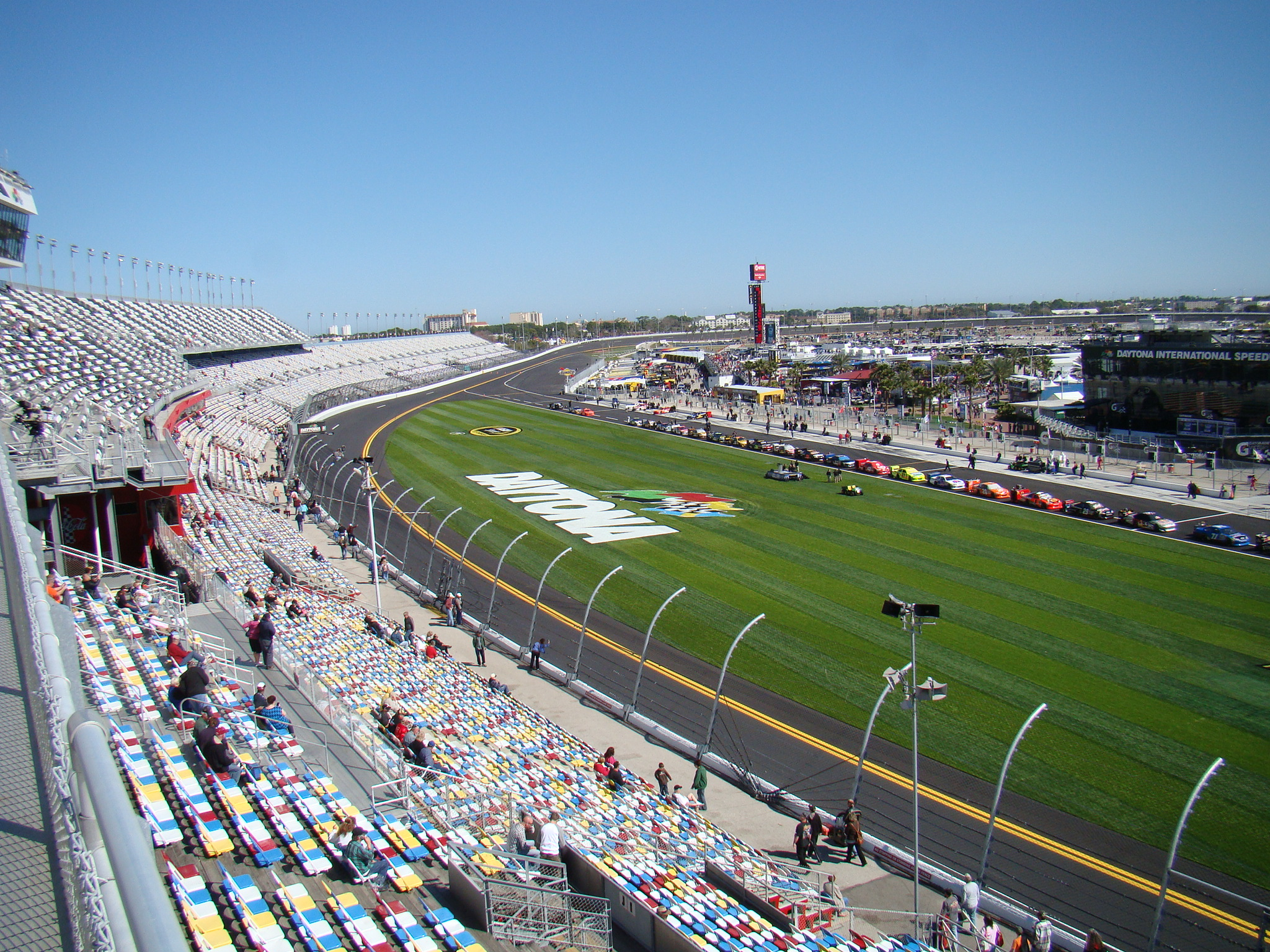
Daytona International Speedway (pictured in 2011), where the race was held.

The 2000 Bud Shootout was the first of two non-points scoring exhibition stock car races of the 2000 NASCAR Winston Cup Series and the 22nd annual edition of the event. It was held on February 13, 2000, in Daytona Beach, Florida at Daytona International Speedway, a superspeedway that holds NASCAR races. Its standard track is a four-turn, 2.5-mile (4.0 km) superspeedway. Daytona's turns are banked at 31 degrees, and the front stretch (the location of the finish line) is banked at 18 degrees.

The Bud Shootout was created by Busch Beer brand manager Monty Roberts as the Busch Clash in 1979. The race, designed to promote Busch Beer, invites the fastest NASCAR drivers from the previous season to compete. The race is considered a "warm-up" for the Daytona 500. It was renamed the Bud Shootout in 1998.

=== Format and eligibility ===
Fifteen drivers were eligible to enter the race, including the fourteen pole position winners from the previous season and the winner of the qualifier race. Mark Martin was the defending race winner, and was among the fourteen pole position winners in 1999. John Andretti had won the pole for the Checker Auto Parts/Dura Lube 500 in November 1999; however, he was not eligible to enter because he did not carry a Budweiser sticker on the car. His team owner, Richard Petty, promised his mother years ago that he would not allow alcohol to sponsor his race cars. The race was 25 laps long, and all drivers were required to make a pit stop to change the right-side tires between laps 10 and 12. Laps that were run under the caution flag were not scored, and if the caution were to be issued, the field would be determined by the running order of the last-completed green flag lap. Every rolling restart had cars alongside each other in pairs (as opposed to the usual single-file restarts at the time), and all lapped competitors had to move to the rear of the field.

The preliminary qualifier race held prior to the Bud Shootout was open to the fastest second-round qualifiers of the 1999 season. The winner of the race would take the fifteenth and final starting position in the Bud Shootout. The same rules from the Bud Shootout also applied to its qualifier race. Among those entered in this race were Dale Jarrett, the defending Winston Cup champion and two-time Daytona 500 winner, who became the first Winston Cup champion since Dale Earnhardt in 1991 to fail to score any poles throughout a season. The day before the Bud Shootout, Jarrett also won the pole for the Daytona 500 on February 20. Jarrett commented on the expectations set upon him following his championship in 1999: "I have said all along that the thing I want to be and this race team wants to be is the best champion NASCAR has seen. We're trying hard to do that, to be as accommodating to as many people as we can and still get our jobs done." Five of Jarrett's crew members, the jackman and four tire changes, were previously crewmen for Jeff Gordon and would make their debut pitting for Jarrett on Sunday.

Other previous Daytona 500 winners such as Geoff Bodine, Darrell Waltrip, and Derrike Cope were also entered in the event. Earnhardt, six-time winner of the Bud Shootout, was not entered in the qualifier race or the main event.

== Practice and qualifying ==
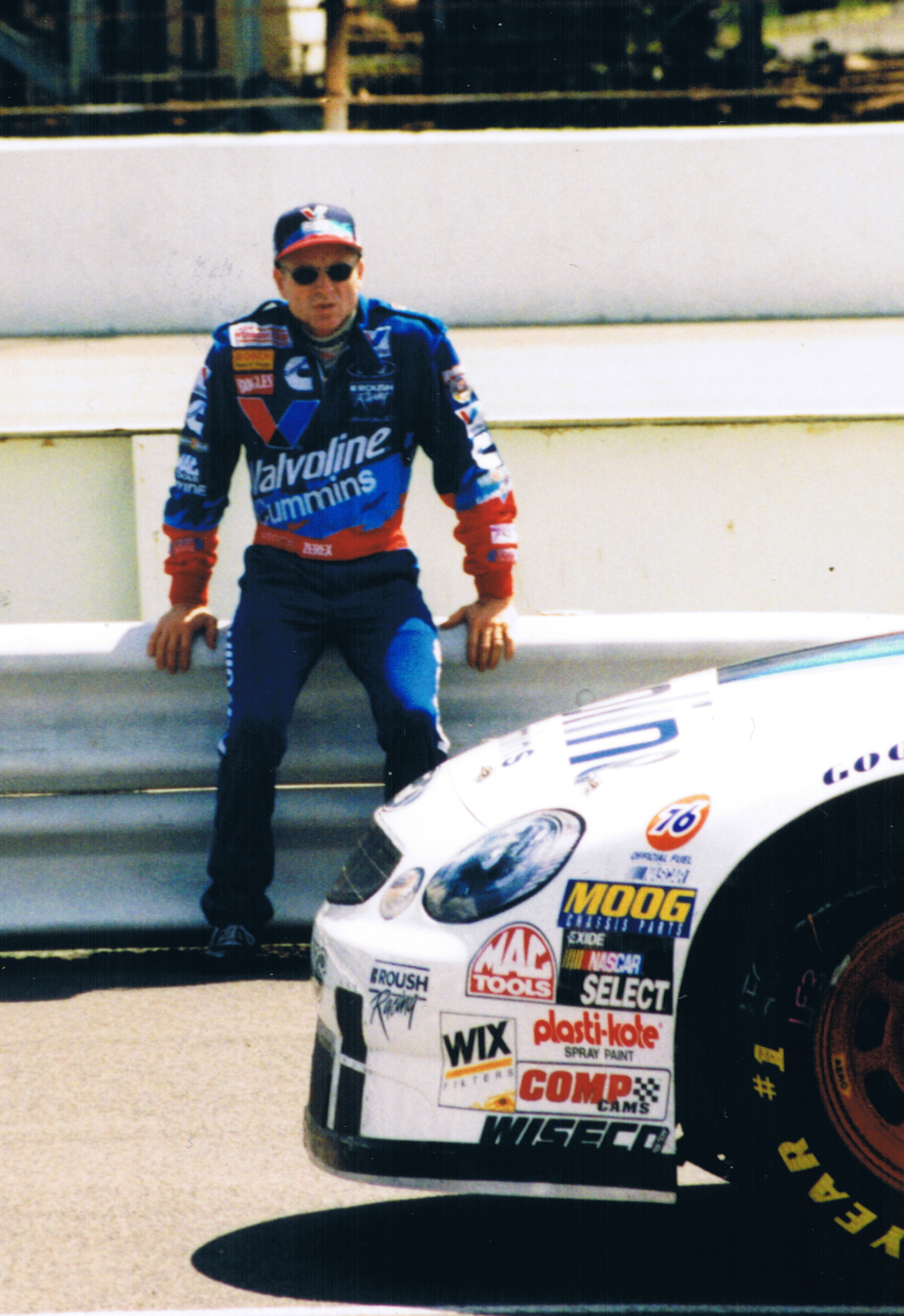
Mark Martin (pictured in 1998) drew the pole for the Bud Shootout.

Three practice sessions were held prior to the race. The first session was held on Friday, February 11, and the last two sessions were held on Saturday, February 12. The first and third sessions lasted for 60 minutes, while the second session lasted 30 minutes. Bobby Labonte led the first session with a time of 46.639 seconds, ahead of Ken Schrader, Kevin Lepage, Terry Labonte, and Dale Jarrett. Ricky Rudd ran the fastest lap of the second session with a time of 47.147 seconds, ahead of Jarrett, Tony Stewart, Sterling Marlin, and Kenny Wallace. Jeff Gordon and Joe Nemechek were tied at 192.049 mph (309.073 km/h) for the fastest lap in the final practice session.

For qualifying, the 14 entered drivers chose their starting positions by lot, a feature unique to the event. The draw was held on Thursday, February 10. Mark Martin drew the pole position, with Marlin, Stewart, Ward Burton, and Mike Skinner rounding out the top five. Gordon, Bobby Labonte, David Green, Rudd, and Schrader drew positions six through ten, while Lepage, Nemechek, Kenny Irwin Jr., and Rusty Wallace drew positions eleventh through fourteenth. Ricky Craven drew the pole position for the qualifier race, and Jimmy Spencer, Jeff Burton, Rick Mast, and Kenny Wallace drew positions second through fifth. Jarrett, Darrell Waltrip, Stanton Barrett, Dave Marcis, Geoff Bodine, Derrike Cope, and Terry Labonte drew the final seven positions. After the draw, Martin showed confidence for the upcoming race: "Winning the pole sums up kind of like how I feel right now. I feel that good. I feel like a new man. Hopefully, we can stay up front. Last year, we had a real good car. It wasn't spectacular, but it was a good car, and every move I made on the race track was the right one."

=== Qualifying results ===
==== Bud Shootout qualifier ====
Pos	No.	Driver	Team	Manufacturer
1	50	Ricky Craven	Midwest Transit Racing	Chevrolet
2	26	Jimmy Spencer	Haas-Carter Motorsports	Ford
3	99	Jeff Burton	Roush Racing	Ford
4	41	Rick Mast	Larry Hedrick Motorsports	Chevrolet
5	55	Kenny Wallace	Andy Petree Racing	Chevrolet
6	88	Dale Jarrett	Robert Yates Racing	Ford
7	66	Darrell Waltrip	Haas-Carter Motorsports	Ford
8	48	Stanton Barrett	TriStar Motorsports	Ford
9	71	Dave Marcis	Marcis Auto Racing	Chevrolet
10	60	Geoff Bodine	Joe Bessey Racing	Chevrolet
11	15	Derrike Cope	Fenley-Moore Motorsports	Ford
12	5	Terry Labonte	Hendrick Motorsports	Chevrolet
Official qualifying results

==== Bud Shootout ====
Pos	No.	Driver	Team	Manufacturer
1	6	Mark Martin	Roush Racing	Ford
2	40	Sterling Marlin	Team SABCO	Chevrolet
3	20	Tony Stewart	Joe Gibbs Racing	Pontiac
4	22	Ward Burton	Bill Davis Racing	Pontiac
5	31	Mike Skinner	Richard Childress Racing	Chevrolet
6	24	Jeff Gordon	Hendrick Motorsports	Chevrolet
7	18	Bobby Labonte	Joe Gibbs Racing	Pontiac
8	34	David Green	Joyner-Kersee-Roehrig Motorsports	Chevrolet
9	28	Ricky Rudd	Robert Yates Racing	Ford
10	36	Ken Schrader	MB2 Motorsports	Pontiac
11	16	Kevin Lepage	Roush Racing	Ford
12	33	Joe Nemechek	Andy Petree Racing	Chevrolet
13	42	Kenny Irwin Jr.	Team SABCO	Chevrolet
14	2	Rusty Wallace	Penske-Kranefuss Racing	Ford
Official qualifying results

== Qualifier race ==
The Bud Shootout qualifier race began on Sunday, February 13, and was broadcast live on ESPN beginning at 11:00 AM EST, with Bob Jenkins, Benny Parsons, and Ray Evernham providing commentary. Derrike Cope, who drew the eleventh starting position, did not participate in this race, as he and the Fenley-Moore Motorsports team elected to focus on second-round qualifying for the Daytona 500. Stanton Barrett, starting 8th, and Dave Marcis, starting 9th, were forced to move to the rear of the field due to missing the qualifying draw.

As the race began, pole sitter Ricky Craven immediately lost the race lead to Jeff Burton in turn one. That same lap, the first caution flag was issued when Kenny Wallace bounced off of the wall in turn four and spun down the tri-oval, collecting Rick Mast and Stanton Barrett in the process. All three drivers were uninjured, though they retired from the race. Since no laps had been completed prior to the crash, the race's start was called off and restarted, with Craven and Dale Jarrett starting on the front row. Burton again passed Craven for the lead in turn one and led the first lap over Craven by a slim margin. Burton led the second lap, but was passed by Craven for the lead on the third lap. Geoff Bodine came into pit road that same lap for repairs to his car as the field split up into two groups.

Jarrett also passed Burton for second position on the fifth lap, and remained in hot pursuit of Craven until Craven, Jarrett, Labonte, and Burton made their mandatory pit stop on lap 10. Jarrett exited pit road first and eventually gained the lead two laps later when Darrell Waltrip took his pit stop. Waltrip's teammate, Jimmy Spencer, retired from the race due to a transmission issue. Craven fell to fourth in the running order, and would pit again for a vibration issue. To make matters worse for the Midwest Transit Racing team, Craven was penalized by NASCAR for exceeding the pit road speed limit as he exited. Craven later retired from the race due to a vibration issue. Jarrett preserved his lead and led the final twelve laps of the race en route to victory and the final starting position of the Bud Shootout. Jarrett also collected $36,363 in race winnings. Burton finished second, 5.095 seconds behind Jarrett. Labonte finished third, Waltrip fourth, and Marcis fifth, the last car on the lead lap. Bodine, Craven, Spencer, Mast, Wallace, Barrett, and Cope completed the finishing order.

=== Qualifier race results ===
Pos	Grid	No	Driver	Team	Manufacturer	Laps
1	6	88	Dale Jarrett	Robert Yates Racing	Ford	25
2	3	99	Jeff Burton	Roush Racing	Ford	25
3	12	5	Terry Labonte	Hendrick Motorsports	Chevrolet	25
4	7	66	Darrell Waltrip	Haas-Carter Motorsports	Ford	25
5	9	71	Dave Marcis	Marcis Auto Racing	Chevrolet	25
6	10	60	Geoff Bodine	Joe Bessey Racing	Chevrolet	23
7	1	50	Ricky Craven	Midwest Transit Racing	Chevrolet	13
8	2	26	Jimmy Spencer	Haas-Carter Motorsports	Ford	10
9	4	41	Rick Mast	Larry Hedrick Motorsports	Chevrolet	0
10	5	55	Kenny Wallace	Andy Petree Racing	Chevrolet	0
11	8	48	Stanton Barrett	TriStar Motorsports	Ford	0
12	11	15	Derrike Cope	Fenley-Moore Motorsports	Ford	0
Official race results

=== Qualifier race statistics ===
- Lead changes: 4 among 4 drivers
- Cautions/Laps: 1 for 0
- Red flags: 0
- Time of race: 20 minutes and 43 seconds
- Average speed: 181.014 miles per hour (291.314 km/h)

=== Starting lineup ===
Pos	No.	Driver	Team	Manufacturer
1	6	Mark Martin	Roush Racing	Ford
2	40	Sterling Marlin	Team SABCO	Chevrolet
3	20	Tony Stewart	Joe Gibbs Racing	Pontiac
4	22	Ward Burton	Bill Davis Racing	Pontiac
5	31	Mike Skinner	Richard Childress Racing	Chevrolet
6	24	Jeff Gordon	Hendrick Motorsports	Chevrolet
7	18	Bobby Labonte	Joe Gibbs Racing	Pontiac
8	34	David Green	Joyner-Kersee-Roehrig Motorsports	Chevrolet
9	28	Ricky Rudd	Robert Yates Racing	Ford
10	36	Ken Schrader	MB2 Motorsports	Pontiac
11	16	Kevin Lepage	Roush Racing	Ford
12	33	Joe Nemechek	Andy Petree Racing	Chevrolet
13	42	Kenny Irwin Jr.	Team SABCO	Chevrolet
14	2	Rusty Wallace	Penske-Kranefuss Racing	Ford
15	88	Dale Jarrett	Robert Yates Racing	Ford
Official starting lineup

== Race ==
The Bud Shootout began at 12:00 PM EST on Sunday, February 13, and was broadcast live on CBS, with Mike Joy, Buddy Baker, and Ned Jarrett providing commentary. Conditions prior to the race were calm and warm, with an air temperature of 72 °F (22 °C) and a wind speed of 6 miles per hour (9.7 km/h).

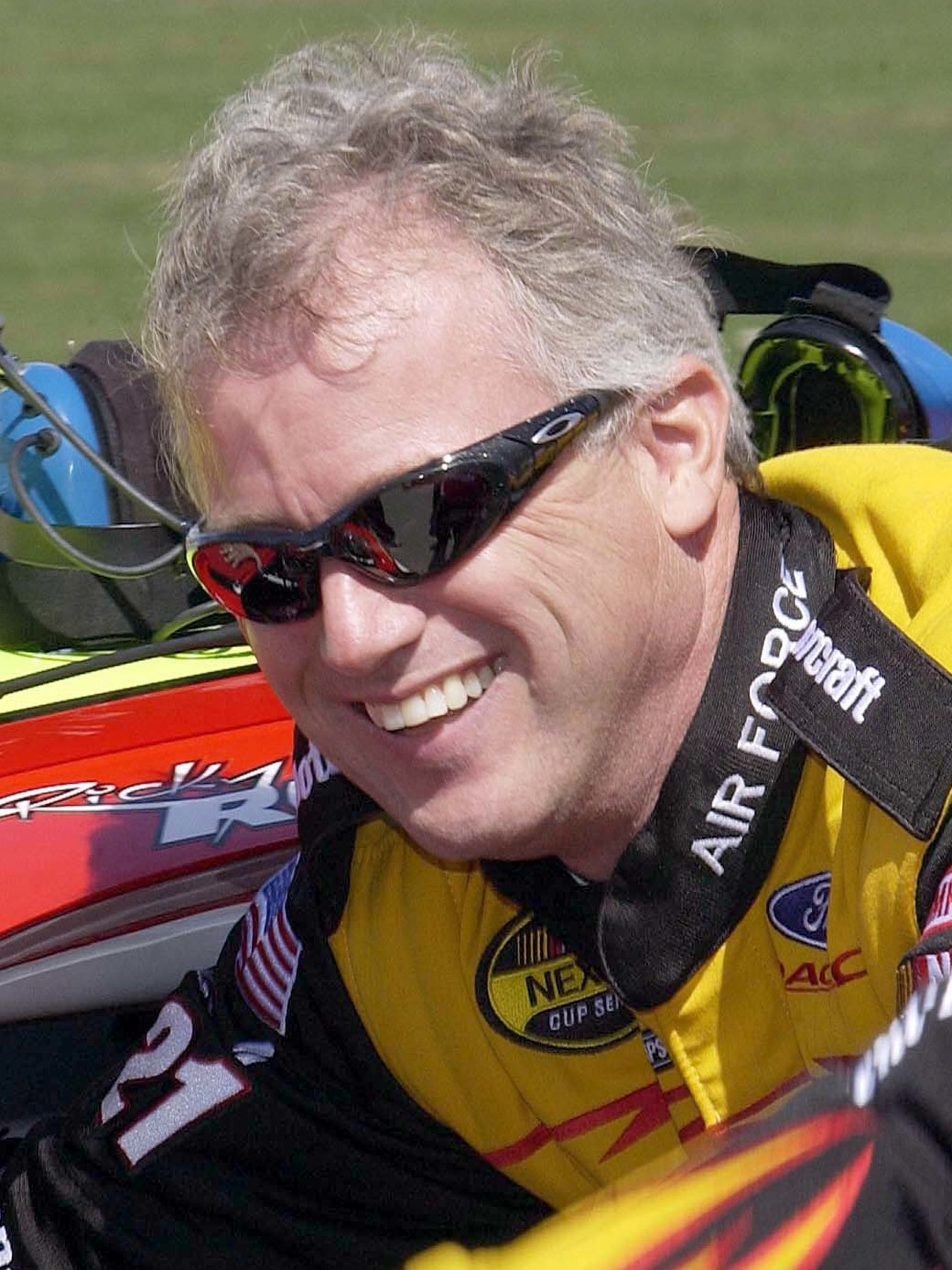
Ricky Rudd (pictured in 2005) flipped upside-down on the final lap of the race.

Not long after the race went green, Jeff Gordon passed Tony Stewart for third position in turn one. Gordon took the race lead down the backstretch as pole sitter Mark Martin receded to the middle of the field. As the fourteen other drivers jockeyed for position, Gordon led the first nine laps of the race. As Mike Skinner began dueling Gordon for the race lead, thirteen drivers entered pit road for their mandatory pit stop on lap ten. Bobby Labonte and Dale Jarrett were the only two drivers who stayed out. Jarrett chose to stay on the track as per crew chief Todd Parrott's strategy to keep Jarrett from pitting on the tenth lap unless he was running in seventh or better; Labonte's crew chief Jimmy Makar approached Parrott right before the race and decided to utilize the same strategy for Labonte. During the pit stops, Martin accidentally struck his jackman, Mike Ehret. Martin subsequently retired from the race. Ehret was later interviewed on the CBS broadcast, ensuring that he was okay. That same lap, Mike Skinner would also retire from the race, citing engine troubles.

On lap eleven, Jarrett and Labonte made their pit stop and merged back into the lead pack as Sterling Marlin took the lead with teammate Kenny Irwin Jr. running behind him. Irwin was later shuffled back to fourth as Ricky Rudd ran second with teammate Jarrett in third. The action would simmer down in the following ten laps, as the drivers began running single-file. However, on lap 23, Jarrett moved alongside Rudd and attempted to pass, to no avail. The next lap, Gordon made another daring move entering turn one, as he passed Rudd and Jarrett for second position. On the final lap of the race, Gordon gained enough momentum to pass Marlin for the lead. However, Marlin didn't give up the lead without a fight, as he nearly forced Gordon into the infield grass. As Marlin lost several positions, Jarrett used the draft to challenge and pass Gordon at the exit of the fourth turn. Jarrett cleared Gordon for the lead as the field approached the tri-oval and brought home the victory, 0.261 seconds ahead of Gordon.

Behind Jarrett and Gordon, Marlin lost grip at the exit of turn four and slid up the track. He made contact with the left-rear quarter panel of Labonte, who spun down the track and collected Rudd. Rudd's car then spun up the track and made heavy contact with the outside wall, sending his car in the air and upside-down. Simultaneously, Rudd's front nose touched the right-rear quarter panel of Ken Schrader's car, causing Schrader to spin into the wall as well. Rudd slid to a stop on the tri-oval just before the start-finish line, and was credited with completing 24 of the race's 25 laps. Rudd, who endured a violent flip in this race in 1984, was unhurt and waved to the crowd. The complete running order at the finish was Jarrett, Gordon, Marlin, Stewart, Kevin Lepage, Schrader, Rusty Wallace, Joe Nemechek, Irwin Jr., Ward Burton, Labonte, and David Green. Rudd, Skinner, and Martin were the retirees of the race.

=== Post-race ===
Dale Jarrett celebrated his win with his crew in victory lane, earning $115,000 in race winnings. In victory lane, Jarrett explained the moves he made on the final lap: "I had a run. I said, 'The car's working good on the outside, so let's give this a try. If it doesn't work, we're not going to lose any points."' He also said: "When I saw Jeff and Sterling get side-by-side I knew they were giving me a chance then. I was hoping Sterling would stay down there beside him as much as he could because that was going to give me more of an opportunity. The 18 stayed right with me and it gave me the push I needed and I really sailed off into Turn 3. I knew when I got there I was at least going to have a chance." Jarrett also spoke on the Chevrolet teams' supposed disadvantage against the Ford teams throughout Speedweeks: "It looks like the Chevrolets are okay. I've heard them complaining a little this week, but their cars looked awful good. It's going to be a heck of a race next week." Parrott also talked about his strategy for Jarrett in the race: "I looked down pit road and it was just chaotic. Everybody races down pit road and the guy on the outside has to get in his pit. The guy in the middle isn't going to give you a bit of room because he knows that's going to cost him time."

Jeff Gordon, who finished second, described his emotions on the final lap: "The 88 and the 28 were sitting there side-by-side and I...shot down to the bottom. I didn't think it would work, but I got inside of them. I said, `What am I doing sitting here in second all of a sudden?'" Third-place finisher Sterling Marlin discussed the last lap from his perspective: "I guess (Rudd) made a run and got to (Jarrett). That gave (Gordon) a run to shoot by them. I was probably in pretty good shape then when he got behind me. We got a little ahead going into (Turn) 1 and Jeff got a real good run off Turn 2. I tried to pinch him down, but he got up enough under me that I knew if I had turned left he was going to wreck us both. It kind of bogged us down and (Jarrett) drove by. It was a pretty wild race." He also took the blame for the three-car wreck on the final lap: "I thought for a split second I was going to miss (Labonte), but it was my fault. I got into him, and the car wouldn't turn. It was the last lap. I knew if I lifted (off the accelerator), I was probably going to run 10th. I thought I could make it, but I didn't. The front end just took off and barely clipped Bobby and turned him around."

Tony Stewart, who finished fourth, commented on his struggles throughout the race: "I felt like we ended up with a good finish," he said. "We had a car that was pretty decent, but we still don't have a driver that is smart enough on restrictor-plate tracks to know what to do and when to do it." He also said: "I'm pretty disappointed in myself right now from that standpoint, that I don't know when it's the right time to move and when to stay in line, and just what to do yet. It's frustrating because it doesn't matter how good a car you've got, everybody else determines your fate." Ricky Rudd talked about his flip on the final lap: "Things didn't quite turn out like we expected. I'm scrunched up thinking, 'I hope nobody hits me when I'm upside-down.'" He continued: "I saw daylight. About the time I made my move, things got jumbled up."

Mark Martin reflected on his incident with his jackman, Mike Ehret: "We just didn't have enough brakes there. It got hot coming in off of the race track and I couldn't stop, I couldn't get it slowed down, I couldn't miss Mike. He was trying to do his job, trying to get around the car." The following Wednesday, he added: "I don't really blame myself for what happened, but I take responsibility. I was sick about it and it took me a while to feel better." Ehret was later treated and released from the infield care center for a lower right leg contusion.

A day after the Bud Shootout, Joyner-Kersee-Roehrig Motorsports withdrew their #34 entry, which was to be driven by David Green, from the Daytona 500 because the team was reportedly not impressed by his performance during the Bud Shootout.

=== Race results ===
Pos	Grid	No	Driver	Team	Manufacturer	Laps
1	15	88	Dale Jarrett	Robert Yates Racing	Ford	25
2	6	24	Jeff Gordon	Hendrick Motorsports	Chevrolet	25
3	2	40	Sterling Marlin	Team SABCO	Chevrolet	25
4	3	20	Tony Stewart	Joe Gibbs Racing	Pontiac	25
5	11	16	Kevin Lepage	Roush Racing	Ford	25
6	10	36	Ken Schrader	MB2 Motorsports	Pontiac	25
7	14	2	Rusty Wallace	Penske-Kranefuss Racing	Ford	25
8	12	33	Joe Nemechek	Andy Petree Racing	Chevrolet	25
9	13	42	Kenny Irwin Jr.	Team SABCO	Chevrolet	25
10	4	22	Ward Burton	Bill Davis Racing	Pontiac	25
11	7	18	Bobby Labonte	Joe Gibbs Racing	Pontiac	25
12	8	34	David Green	Joyner-Kersee-Roehrig Motorsports	Chevrolet	25
13	9	28	Ricky Rudd	Robert Yates Racing	Ford	24
14	5	31	Mike Skinner	Richard Childress Racing	Chevrolet	10
15	1	6	Mark Martin	Roush Racing	Ford	10
Official race results

=== Race statistics ===
- Lead changes: 4 among 4 drivers
- Cautions/Laps: 0 for 0
- Red flags: 0
- Time of race: 20 minutes and 34 seconds
- Average speed: 182.334 miles per hour (293.438 km/h)
