= 2000 Checker Auto Parts/Dura Lube 500k =

32nd race of the 2000 NASCAR Winston Cup Series

Race details
- Race 32 of 34 in the 2000 NASCAR Winston Cup Series
- The 2000 Checker Auto Parts/Dura Lube 500k program cover.
- Date: November 5, 2000
- Official name: 13th Annual Checker Auto Parts/Dura Lube 500k
- Location: Avondale, Arizona, Phoenix International Raceway
- Course: Permanent racing facility
- Course length: 1 miles (1.6 km)
- Distance: 312 laps, 312 mi (502.115 km)
- Average speed: 105.041 miles per hour (169.047 km/h)

Pole position
Driver	Rusty Wallace	Penske-Kranefuss Racing
- Time: 26.830

Most laps led
Driver	Jeff Burton	Roush Racing
- Laps: 105

Winner
No. 99	Jeff Burton	Roush Racing

Television in the United States
- Network: TNN
- Announcers: Eli Gold, Buddy Baker, Dick Berggren

Radio in the United States
- Radio: Motor Racing Network

The 2000 Checker Auto Parts/Dura Lube 500k was the 32nd stock car race of the 2000 NASCAR Winston Cup Series and the 52nd iteration of the event. The race was held on Sunday, November 5, 2000, in Avondale, Arizona at Phoenix International Raceway, a 1-mile (1.6 km) permanent low-banked tri-oval race track. The race took the scheduled 312 laps to complete. At race's end, Jeff Burton, driving for Roush Racing, would charge to the front on the final restart with 11 to go to win his 15th career NASCAR Winston Cup Series win and the third and final win of his season. To fill out the podium, Jeremy Mayfield, driving for Penske-Kranefuss Racing, and Steve Park, driving for Dale Earnhardt, Inc., would finish second and third, respectively.

== Background ==
The layout of Phoenix International Raceway, the venue where the race was held.

Phoenix International Raceway – also known as PIR – is a one-mile, low-banked tri-oval race track located in Avondale, Arizona. It is named after the nearby metropolitan area of Phoenix. The motorsport track opened in 1964 and currently hosts two NASCAR race weekends annually. PIR has also hosted the IndyCar Series, CART, USAC and the Rolex Sports Car Series. The raceway is currently owned and operated by International Speedway Corporation.

The raceway was originally constructed with a 2.5 mi (4.0 km) road course that ran both inside and outside of the main tri-oval. In 1991 the track was reconfigured with the current 1.51 mi (2.43 km) interior layout. PIR has an estimated grandstand seating capacity of around 67,000. Lights were installed around the track in 2004 following the addition of a second annual NASCAR race weekend.

=== Entry list ===
- (R) denotes rookie driver.

#	Driver	Team	Make
1	Steve Park	Dale Earnhardt, Inc.	Chevrolet
01	Ted Musgrave	Team SABCO	Chevrolet
2	Rusty Wallace	Penske-Kranefuss Racing	Ford
02	Ryan Newman	Penske-Kranefuss Racing	Ford
3	Dale Earnhardt	Richard Childress Racing	Chevrolet
4	Bobby Hamilton	Morgan–McClure Motorsports	Chevrolet
5	Terry Labonte	Hendrick Motorsports	Chevrolet
6	Mark Martin	Roush Racing	Ford
7	Michael Waltrip	Mattei Motorsports	Chevrolet
8	Dale Earnhardt Jr. (R)	Dale Earnhardt, Inc.	Chevrolet
9	Stacy Compton (R)	Melling Racing	Ford
10	Johnny Benson Jr.	Tyler Jet Motorsports	Pontiac
11	Brett Bodine	Brett Bodine Racing	Ford
12	Jeremy Mayfield	Penske-Kranefuss Racing	Ford
13	Robby Gordon	Team Menard	Ford
14	Rick Mast	A. J. Foyt Enterprises	Pontiac
16	Kevin Lepage	Roush Racing	Ford
17	Matt Kenseth (R)	Roush Racing	Ford
18	Bobby Labonte	Joe Gibbs Racing	Pontiac
20	Tony Stewart	Joe Gibbs Racing	Pontiac
21	Elliott Sadler	Wood Brothers Racing	Ford
22	Ward Burton	Bill Davis Racing	Pontiac
24	Jeff Gordon	Hendrick Motorsports	Chevrolet
25	Jerry Nadeau	Hendrick Motorsports	Chevrolet
26	Jimmy Spencer	Haas-Carter Motorsports	Ford
27	Mike Bliss (R)	Eel River Racing	Pontiac
28	Ricky Rudd	Robert Yates Racing	Ford
31	Mike Skinner	Richard Childress Racing	Chevrolet
32	Scott Pruett (R)	PPI Motorsports	Ford
33	Joe Nemechek	Andy Petree Racing	Chevrolet
36	Ken Schrader	MB2 Motorsports	Pontiac
40	Sterling Marlin	Team SABCO	Chevrolet
43	John Andretti	Petty Enterprises	Pontiac
44	Steve Grissom	Petty Enterprises	Pontiac
50	Ricky Craven	Midwest Transit Racing	Chevrolet
55	Kenny Wallace	Andy Petree Racing	Chevrolet
60	Rich Bickle	Joe Bessey Racing	Chevrolet
66	Darrell Waltrip	Haas-Carter Motorsports	Ford
71	Dave Marcis	Marcis Auto Racing	Chevrolet
75	Wally Dallenbach Jr.	Galaxy Motorsports	Ford
77	Robert Pressley	Jasper Motorsports	Ford
88	Dale Jarrett	Robert Yates Racing	Ford
90	Hut Stricklin	Donlavey Racing	Ford
93	Dave Blaney (R)	Bill Davis Racing	Pontiac
94	Bill Elliott	Bill Elliott Racing	Ford
96	Andy Houston	PPI Motorsports	Ford
97	Kurt Busch	Roush Racing	Ford
99	Jeff Burton	Roush Racing	Ford
Official entry list

== Practice ==
=== First practice ===
The first practice session was held on Friday, November 3, at 10:30 AM MST. The session would last for 55 minutes. Robert Pressley, driving for Jasper Motorsports, would set the fastest time in the session, with a lap of 27.108 and an average speed of 132.802 mph (213.724 km/h).

Pos.	#	Driver	Team	Make	Time	Speed
1	77	Robert Pressley	Jasper Motorsports	Ford	27.108	132.802
2	10	Johnny Benson Jr.	Tyler Jet Motorsports	Pontiac	27.120	132.743
3	33	Joe Nemechek	Andy Petree Racing	Chevrolet	27.175	132.475
Full first practice results

=== Second practice ===
The second practice session was held on Friday, November 3, at 12:35 PM MST. The session would last for 50 minutes. Johnny Benson Jr., driving for Tyler Jet Motorsports, would set the fastest time in the session, with a lap of 27.069 and an average speed of 132.993 mph (214.031 km/h).

Pos.	#	Driver	Team	Make	Time	Speed
1	10	Johnny Benson Jr.	Tyler Jet Motorsports	Pontiac	27.069	132.993
2	6	Mark Martin	Roush Racing	Ford	27.087	132.905
3	99	Jeff Burton	Roush Racing	Ford	27.089	132.895
Full second practice results

=== Third practice ===
The third practice session was held on Saturday, November 4, at 8:30 AM MST. The session would last for one hour. Johnny Benson Jr., driving for Tyler Jet Motorsports, would set the fastest time in the session, with a lap of 27.775 and an average speed of 129.613 mph (208.592 km/h).

Pos.	#	Driver	Team	Make	Time	Speed
1	10	Johnny Benson Jr.	Tyler Jet Motorsports	Pontiac	27.775	129.613
2	44	Steve Grissom	Petty Enterprises	Pontiac	27.807	129.464
3	7	Michael Waltrip	Mattei Motorsports	Chevrolet	27.809	129.454
Full third practice results

=== Fourth and final practice ===
The final practice session, sometimes referred to as Happy Hour, was held on Saturday, November 4, at 10:30 AM MST. The session would last for one hour. Ken Schrader, driving for MB2 Motorsports, would set the fastest time in the session, with a lap of 27.069 and an average speed of 132.993 mph (214.031 km/h).

Pos.	#	Driver	Team	Make	Time	Speed
1	36	Ken Schrader	MB2 Motorsports	Pontiac	27.729	129.828
2	10	Johnny Benson Jr.	Tyler Jet Motorsports	Pontiac	27.751	129.725
3	33	Joe Nemechek	Andy Petree Racing	Chevrolet	27.759	129.688
Full Happy Hour practice results

== Qualifying ==
Qualifying was split into two rounds. The first round was held on Friday, November 3, at 2:15 PM MST. Each driver would have one lap to set a time. During the first round, the top 25 drivers in the round would be guaranteed a starting spot in the race. If a driver was not able to guarantee a spot in the first round, they had the option to scrub their time from the first round and try and run a faster lap time in a second round qualifying run, held on Saturday, November 4, at 12:15 PM MST. As with the first round, each driver would have a lap to set a time. Positions 26-36 would be decided on time, while positions 37-43 would be based on provisionals. Six spots are awarded by the use of provisionals based on owner's points. The seventh is awarded to a past champion who has not otherwise qualified for the race. If no past champion needs the provisional, the next team in the owner points will be awarded a provisional.

Rusty Wallace, driving for Penske-Kranefuss Racing, would win the pole, setting a time of 26.830 and an average speed of 134.178 miles per hour (215.939 km/h).

Five drivers would fail to qualify: Stacy Compton, Steve Grissom, Robby Gordon, Dave Marcis, and Hut Stricklin.

=== Full qualifying results ===
Pos.	#	Driver	Team	Make	Time	Speed
1	2	Rusty Wallace	Penske-Kranefuss Racing	Ford	26.830	134.178
2	99	Jeff Burton	Roush Racing	Ford	26.845	134.103
3	77	Robert Pressley	Jasper Motorsports	Ford	27.011	133.279
4	10	Johnny Benson Jr.	Tyler Jet Motorsports	Pontiac	27.032	133.175
5	1	Steve Park	Dale Earnhardt, Inc.	Chevrolet	27.035	133.161
6	36	Ken Schrader	MB2 Motorsports	Pontiac	27.044	133.116
7	55	Kenny Wallace	Andy Petree Racing	Chevrolet	27.044	133.116
8	6	Mark Martin	Roush Racing	Ford	27.054	133.067
9	18	Bobby Labonte	Joe Gibbs Racing	Pontiac	27.055	133.062
10	02	Ryan Newman	Penske-Kranefuss Racing	Ford	27.061	133.033
11	50	Ricky Craven	Midwest Transit Racing	Chevrolet	27.063	133.023
12	17	Matt Kenseth (R)	Roush Racing	Ford	27.064	133.018
13	93	Dave Blaney (R)	Bill Davis Racing	Pontiac	27.073	132.974
14	26	Jimmy Spencer	Haas-Carter Motorsports	Ford	27.107	132.807
15	27	Mike Bliss (R)	Eel River Racing	Pontiac	27.147	132.611
16	4	Bobby Hamilton	Morgan–McClure Motorsports	Chevrolet	27.182	132.441
17	28	Ricky Rudd	Robert Yates Racing	Ford	27.183	132.436
18	8	Dale Earnhardt Jr. (R)	Dale Earnhardt, Inc.	Chevrolet	27.184	132.431
19	22	Ward Burton	Bill Davis Racing	Pontiac	27.186	132.421
20	75	Wally Dallenbach Jr.	Galaxy Motorsports	Ford	27.211	132.299
21	32	Scott Pruett (R)	PPI Motorsports	Ford	27.220	132.256
22	16	Kevin Lepage	Roush Racing	Ford	27.223	132.241
23	11	Brett Bodine	Brett Bodine Racing	Ford	27.240	132.159
24	24	Jeff Gordon	Hendrick Motorsports	Chevrolet	27.248	132.120
25	12	Jeremy Mayfield	Penske-Kranefuss Racing	Ford	27.251	132.105
26	97	Kurt Busch	Roush Racing	Ford	27.260	132.062
27	40	Sterling Marlin	Team SABCO	Chevrolet	27.261	132.057
28	14	Rick Mast	A. J. Foyt Enterprises	Pontiac	27.263	132.047
29	43	John Andretti	Petty Enterprises	Pontiac	27.264	132.042
30	31	Mike Skinner	Richard Childress Racing	Chevrolet	27.327	131.738
31	3	Dale Earnhardt	Richard Childress Racing	Chevrolet	27.332	131.714
32	96	Andy Houston	PPI Motorsports	Ford	27.368	131.540
33	21	Elliott Sadler	Wood Brothers Racing	Ford	27.395	131.411
34	66	Darrell Waltrip	Haas-Carter Motorsports	Ford	27.406	131.358
35	94	Bill Elliott	Bill Elliott Racing	Ford	27.411	131.334
36	88	Dale Jarrett	Robert Yates Racing	Ford	27.413	131.325
Provisionals
37	20	Tony Stewart (R)	Joe Gibbs Racing	Pontiac	27.603	130.421
38	5	Terry Labonte	Hendrick Motorsports	Chevrolet	27.428	131.253
39	33	Joe Nemechek	Andy Petree Racing	Chevrolet	27.424	131.272
40	25	Jerry Nadeau	Hendrick Motorsports	Chevrolet	27.476	131.023
41	01	Ted Musgrave	Team SABCO	Chevrolet	27.423	131.277
42	7	Michael Waltrip	Mattei Motorsports	Chevrolet	27.644	130.227
43	60	Rich Bickle	Joe Bessey Racing	Chevrolet	27.462	131.090
Failed to qualify
44	9	Stacy Compton (R)	Melling Racing	Ford	27.586	130.501
45	44	Steve Grissom	Petty Enterprises	Pontiac	27.803	129.482
46	13	Robby Gordon	Team Menard	Ford	27.945	128.824
47	71	Dave Marcis	Marcis Auto Racing	Chevrolet	28.133	127.964
48	90	Hut Stricklin	Donlavey Racing	Ford	28.446	126.556
Official first round qualifying results
Official starting lineup

== Race results ==
Fin	St	#	Driver	Team	Make	Laps	Led	Status	Pts	Winnings
1	2	99	Jeff Burton	Roush Racing	Ford	312	105	running	185	$197,345
2	25	12	Jeremy Mayfield	Penske-Kranefuss Racing	Ford	312	46	running	175	$124,925
3	5	1	Steve Park	Dale Earnhardt, Inc.	Chevrolet	312	11	running	170	$112,250
4	1	2	Rusty Wallace	Penske-Kranefuss Racing	Ford	312	86	running	165	$98,860
5	9	18	Bobby Labonte	Joe Gibbs Racing	Pontiac	312	1	running	160	$100,250
6	8	6	Mark Martin	Roush Racing	Ford	312	12	running	155	$80,400
7	24	24	Jeff Gordon	Hendrick Motorsports	Chevrolet	312	0	running	146	$81,550
8	13	93	Dave Blaney (R)	Bill Davis Racing	Pontiac	312	0	running	142	$57,900
9	31	3	Dale Earnhardt	Richard Childress Racing	Chevrolet	312	1	running	143	$69,300
10	36	88	Dale Jarrett	Robert Yates Racing	Ford	312	0	running	134	$86,000
11	30	31	Mike Skinner	Richard Childress Racing	Chevrolet	312	3	running	135	$61,500
12	19	22	Ward Burton	Bill Davis Racing	Pontiac	312	0	running	127	$64,500
13	14	26	Jimmy Spencer	Haas-Carter Motorsports	Ford	312	0	running	124	$59,500
14	37	20	Tony Stewart (R)	Joe Gibbs Racing	Pontiac	312	1	running	126	$62,500
15	27	40	Sterling Marlin	Team SABCO	Chevrolet	312	0	running	118	$57,875
16	4	10	Johnny Benson Jr.	Tyler Jet Motorsports	Pontiac	312	1	running	120	$46,075
17	38	5	Terry Labonte	Hendrick Motorsports	Chevrolet	312	0	running	112	$59,075
18	11	50	Ricky Craven	Midwest Transit Racing	Chevrolet	312	0	running	109	$40,850
19	7	55	Kenny Wallace	Andy Petree Racing	Chevrolet	312	0	running	106	$54,150
20	23	11	Brett Bodine	Brett Bodine Racing	Ford	312	0	running	103	$44,925
21	22	16	Kevin Lepage	Roush Racing	Ford	312	0	running	100	$52,400
22	20	75	Wally Dallenbach Jr.	Galaxy Motorsports	Ford	311	0	running	97	$44,075
23	40	25	Jerry Nadeau	Hendrick Motorsports	Chevrolet	311	2	running	99	$51,850
24	39	33	Joe Nemechek	Andy Petree Racing	Chevrolet	311	0	running	91	$51,600
25	41	01	Ted Musgrave	Team SABCO	Chevrolet	311	2	running	93	$52,275
26	35	94	Bill Elliott	Bill Elliott Racing	Ford	311	0	running	85	$51,150
27	18	8	Dale Earnhardt Jr. (R)	Dale Earnhardt, Inc.	Chevrolet	311	0	running	82	$49,625
28	29	43	John Andretti	Petty Enterprises	Pontiac	311	0	running	79	$57,500
29	26	97	Kurt Busch	Roush Racing	Ford	311	0	running	76	$50,675
30	33	21	Elliott Sadler	Wood Brothers Racing	Ford	311	0	running	73	$51,550
31	3	77	Robert Pressley	Jasper Motorsports	Ford	311	0	running	70	$42,525
32	42	7	Michael Waltrip	Mattei Motorsports	Chevrolet	310	0	running	67	$50,000
33	34	66	Darrell Waltrip	Haas-Carter Motorsports	Ford	310	0	running	64	$41,875
34	21	32	Scott Pruett (R)	PPI Motorsports	Ford	310	0	running	61	$38,750
35	43	60	Rich Bickle	Joe Bessey Racing	Chevrolet	309	0	running	58	$49,125
36	32	96	Andy Houston	PPI Motorsports	Ford	309	0	running	55	$38,500
37	17	28	Ricky Rudd	Robert Yates Racing	Ford	300	41	running	57	$46,375
38	15	27	Mike Bliss (R)	Eel River Racing	Pontiac	291	0	crash	49	$38,250
39	28	14	Rick Mast	A. J. Foyt Enterprises	Pontiac	282	0	crash	46	$38,125
40	6	36	Ken Schrader	MB2 Motorsports	Pontiac	260	0	running	43	$37,975
41	10	02	Ryan Newman	Penske-Kranefuss Racing	Ford	176	0	engine	40	$37,825
42	12	17	Matt Kenseth (R)	Roush Racing	Ford	53	0	crash	37	$45,700
43	16	4	Bobby Hamilton	Morgan–McClure Motorsports	Chevrolet	51	0	crash	34	$45,575
Official race results

Previous race: 2000 Pop Secret Microwave Popcorn 400	NASCAR Winston Cup Series; 2000 season	Next race: 2000 Pennzoil 400
