= 2000 Pepsi Southern 500 =

2000 Pepsi Southern 500 presented by Kmart
Race details
- Race 24 of 34 in the 2000 NASCAR Winston Cup Series
- 2000 Southern 500 program logo
- Date: September 3, 2000
- Official name: Pepsi Southern 500 presented by Kmart
- Location: Darlington Raceway, Darlington County, South Carolina
- Course: Permanent racing facility
- Course length: 1.366 miles (2.198 km)
- Distance: 328 laps, 448.048 mi (721.063 km)
- Scheduled distance: 367 laps, 501.322 mi (806.800 km)
- Weather: Temperatures reaching up to 84.2 °F (29.0 °C); wind speeds up to 20.8 miles per hour (33.5 km/h)
- Average speed: 108.273 miles per hour (174.249 km/h)

Pole position
Driver	Jeremy Mayfield	Penske-Kranefuss Racing
- Time: 29.022

Most laps led
Driver	Jeremy Mayfield	Penske-Kranefuss Racing
- Laps: 104

Winner
No. 18	Bobby Labonte	Joe Gibbs Racing

Television in the United States
- Network: ESPN/ESPN2
- Announcers: Bob Jenkins, Ned Jarrett and Benny Parsons

The 2000 Pepsi Southern 500 presented by Kmart, the 51st running of the event, was the 24th race of the 2000 NASCAR Winston Cup Series season. It was held at Darlington Raceway on September 3, 2000. The race was scheduled for 367 laps but was shortened to 328 laps due to rain. Bobby Labonte of Joe Gibbs Racing won the race.

Darrell Waltrip would lead his final Cup Series lap in his career on lap 48. Rick Mast would also lead a lap for the final time in his career on lap 304. The Mayfield-Marcis tango didn't bring out a caution. Mayfield thought he was clear out of 2, then got hooked in the wall by Marcis. Mayfield slid down the track, sparks flying, right-front tore up, but the green flag remained active.

== Qualifying ==
=== Full qualifying results ===
RANK	DRIVER	NBR	CAR	TIME	SPEED	
1	Jeremy Mayfield	12	Ford	29.022	169.444	
2	Johnny Benson Jr.	10	Pontiac	29.028	169.409	
3	Ward Burton	22	Pontiac	29.052	169.269	
4	Mike Skinner	31	Chevrolet	29.062	169.211	
5	Mark Martin	6	Ford	29.078	169.118	
6	Dale Earnhardt	3	Chevrolet	29.111	168.926	
7	Scott Pruett	32	Ford	29.117	168.891	
8	Ken Schrader	36	Pontiac	29.178	168.538	
9	Dale Jarrett	88	Ford	29.246	168.146	
10	Jeff Gordon	24	Chevrolet	29.275	167.980	
11	Michael Waltrip	7	Chevrolet	29.309	167.785	
12	Jimmy Spencer	26	Ford	29.313	167.762	
13	Dale Earnhardt Jr.	8	Chevrolet	29.354	167.527	
14	Kenny Wallace	55	Chevrolet	29.358	167.505	
15	Jerry Nadeau	25	Chevrolet	29.370	167.436	
16	Rusty Wallace	2	Ford	29.373	167.419	
17	Ricky Rudd	28	Ford	29.375	167.408	
18	Brett Bodine	11	Ford	29.377	167.396	
19	Bobby Hamilton	4	Chevrolet	29.412	167.197	
20	Mike Bliss	27	Pontiac	29.421	167.146	
21	Elliott Sadler	21	Ford	29.447	166.998	
22	Dave Blaney	93	Pontiac	29.458	166.936	
23	Geoffrey Bodine	60	Chevrolet	29.475	166.840	
24	Matt Kenseth	17	Ford	29.489	166.760	
25	Joe Nemechek	33	Chevrolet	29.500	166.698	
26	Chad Little	97	Ford	29.506	166.664	
27	Ted Musgrave	01	Chevrolet	29.519	166.591	
28	Dave Marcis	71	Chevrolet	29.527	166.546	
29	Tony Stewart	20	Pontiac	29.531	166.523	
30	Kevin Lepage	16	Ford	29.531	166.523	
31	Rick Mast	14	Pontiac	29.551	166.411	
32	Hut Stricklin	90	Ford	29.576	166.270	
33	Sterling Marlin	40	Chevrolet	29.584	166.225	
34	John Andretti	43	Pontiac	29.599	166.141	
35	Jeff Burton	99	Ford	29.608	166.090	
36	Steve Grissom	44	Pontiac	29.641	165.905	
37	Bobby Labonte	18	Pontiac			PR
38	Terry Labonte	5	Chevrolet			PR
39	Steve Park	1	Chevrolet			PR
40	David Green	94	Ford			PR
41	Robert Pressley	77	Ford			PR
42	Wally Dallenbach Jr.	75	Ford			PR
43	Darrell Waltrip	66	Ford			PR
44	Stacy Compton	9	Ford	30.031	163.751	

OP: qualified via owners points

PC: qualified as past champion

PR: provisional

QR: via qualifying race

* - had to qualify on time

== Results ==
POS	ST	#	DRIVER	SPONSOR / OWNER	CAR	LAPS	MONEY	STATUS	LED	PTS
1	37	18	Bobby Labonte	Interstate Batteries (Joe Gibbs)	Pontiac	328	198180	running	10	180
2	35	99	Jeff Burton	Exide Batteries (Jack Roush)	Ford	328	106705	running	17	175
3	6	3	Dale Earnhardt	GM Goodwrench Service (Richard Childress)	Chevrolet	328	82745	running	47	170
4	10	24	Jeff Gordon	DuPont Automotive Finishes (Rick Hendrick)	Chevrolet	328	82540	running	24	165
5	9	88	Dale Jarrett	Quality Care / Ford Credit (Yates Racing)	Ford	328	80570	running	3	160
6	3	22	Ward Burton	Caterpillar (Bill Davis)	Pontiac	328	66655	running	59	155
7	30	16	Kevin Lepage	FamilyClick.com / TV Guide (Jack Roush)	Ford	328	55535	running	0	146
8	17	28	Ricky Rudd	Texaco / Havoline (Yates Racing)	Ford	328	52475	running	0	142
9	29	20	Tony Stewart	Home Depot (Joe Gibbs)	Pontiac	328	55735	running	0	138
10	39	1	Steve Park	Pennzoil (Dale Earnhardt, Inc.)	Chevrolet	328	55330	running	0	134
11	13	8	Dale Earnhardt Jr.	Budweiser (Dale Earnhardt, Inc.)	Chevrolet	328	46345	running	16	135
12	31	14	Rick Mast	Conseco (A.J. Foyt)	Pontiac	328	39750	running	1	132
13	27	01	Ted Musgrave	BellSouth (Felix Sabates)	Chevrolet	328	48860	running	0	124
14	5	6	Mark Martin	Valvoline / Cummins (Jack Roush)	Ford	328	56970	running	29	126
15	38	5	Terry Labonte	Kellogg's (Rick Hendrick)	Chevrolet	328	53680	running	0	118
16	8	36	Ken Schrader	M&M's (Nelson Bowers)	Pontiac	327	38310	running	1	120
17	33	40	Sterling Marlin	Coors Light (Felix Sabates)	Chevrolet	327	46390	running	0	112
18	21	21	Elliott Sadler	Citgo (Wood Brothers)	Ford	327	45615	running	0	109
19	42	75	Wally Dallenbach Jr.	Cartoon Network/Scooby Doo (Darwin Oordt)	Ford	327	36660	running	0	106
20	22	93	Dave Blaney	Amoco (Bill Davis)	Pontiac	327	35865	running	0	103
21	26	97	Chad Little	John Deere (Jack Roush)	Ford	327	45065	running	1	105
22	19	4	Bobby Hamilton	Kodak (Larry McClure)	Chevrolet	326	43820	running	0	97
23	28	71	Dave Marcis	RealTree Camouflage (Dave Marcis)	Chevrolet	326	31950	running	13	99
24	7	32	Scott Pruett	Tide (Cal Wells)	Ford	324	31750	running	0	91
25	40	94	David Green	McDonald's (Bill Elliott)	Ford	324	43215	running	0	88
26	36	44	Steve Grissom	Hot Wheels (Petty Enterprises)	Pontiac	324	43330	running	0	85
27	18	11	Brett Bodine	Ralph's Supermarkets (Brett Bodine)	Ford	324	31295	running	0	82
28	20	27	Mike Bliss	Pfizer / Viagra (Jack Birmingham)	Pontiac	323	31160	running	0	79
29	15	25	Jerry Nadeau	Michael Holigan.com (Rick Hendrick)	Chevrolet	315	42425	engine	0	76
30	16	2	Rusty Wallace	Miller Lite (Roger Penske)	Ford	308	48940	running	0	73
31	25	33	Joe Nemechek	Oakwood Homes (Andy Petree)	Chevrolet	306	42580	engine	0	70
32	12	26	Jimmy Spencer	Big Kmart / Route 66 (Travis Carter)	Ford	305	41865	running	2	72
33	24	17	Matt Kenseth	DeWalt Tools (Jack Roush)	Ford	286	41675	running	0	64
34	32	90	Hut Stricklin	Hills Brothers Coffee (Junie Donlavey)	Ford	268	30515	engine	0	61
35	14	55	Kenny Wallace	Square D / Cooper Lighting (Andy Petree)	Chevrolet	264	41380	engine	0	58
36	41	77	Robert Pressley	Jasper Engines (Doug Bawel)	Ford	245	33295	running	0	55
37	34	43	John Andretti	Cheerios (Petty Enterprises)	Pontiac	223	48206	crash	0	52
38	2	10	Johnny Benson Jr.	Aaron's Rents / RCA (Nelson Bowers)	Pontiac	175	32535	handling	0	49
39	23	60	Geoffrey Bodine	Power Team (Joe Bessey)	Chevrolet	171	38000	crash	0	46
40	11	7	Michael Waltrip	NationsRent (Jim Smith)	Chevrolet	123	37900	engine	0	43
41	1	12	Jeremy Mayfield	Mobil 1 (Michael Kranefuss)	Ford	120	37850	crash	104	50
42	43	66	Darrell Waltrip	Big Kmart / Route 66 (Travis Carter)	Ford	113	29800	electrical	1	42
43	4	31	Mike Skinner	Lowe's (Richard Childress)	Chevrolet	15	37750	engine	0	34

== Race statistics ==
- Time of race: 4:08:20
- Average speed: 108.273 miles per hour (174.249 km/h)
- Pole speed: 169.444 miles per hour (272.694 km/h)
- Cautions: 9 for 69 laps
- Margin of victory: under caution
- Lead changes: 22
- Percent of race run under caution: 21%
- Average green flag run: 28.8 laps
