= 2000 NASCAR Winston Cup Series =

American motorsport season

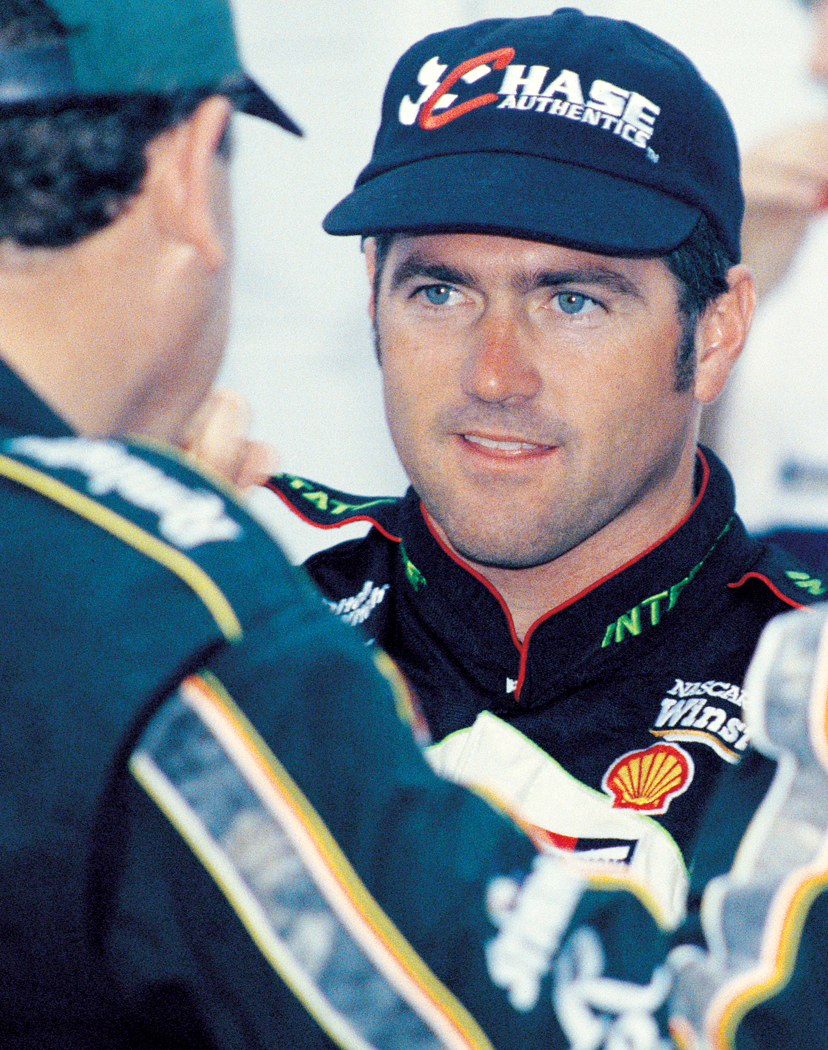
Bobby Labonte, the 2000 Winston Cup Series champion

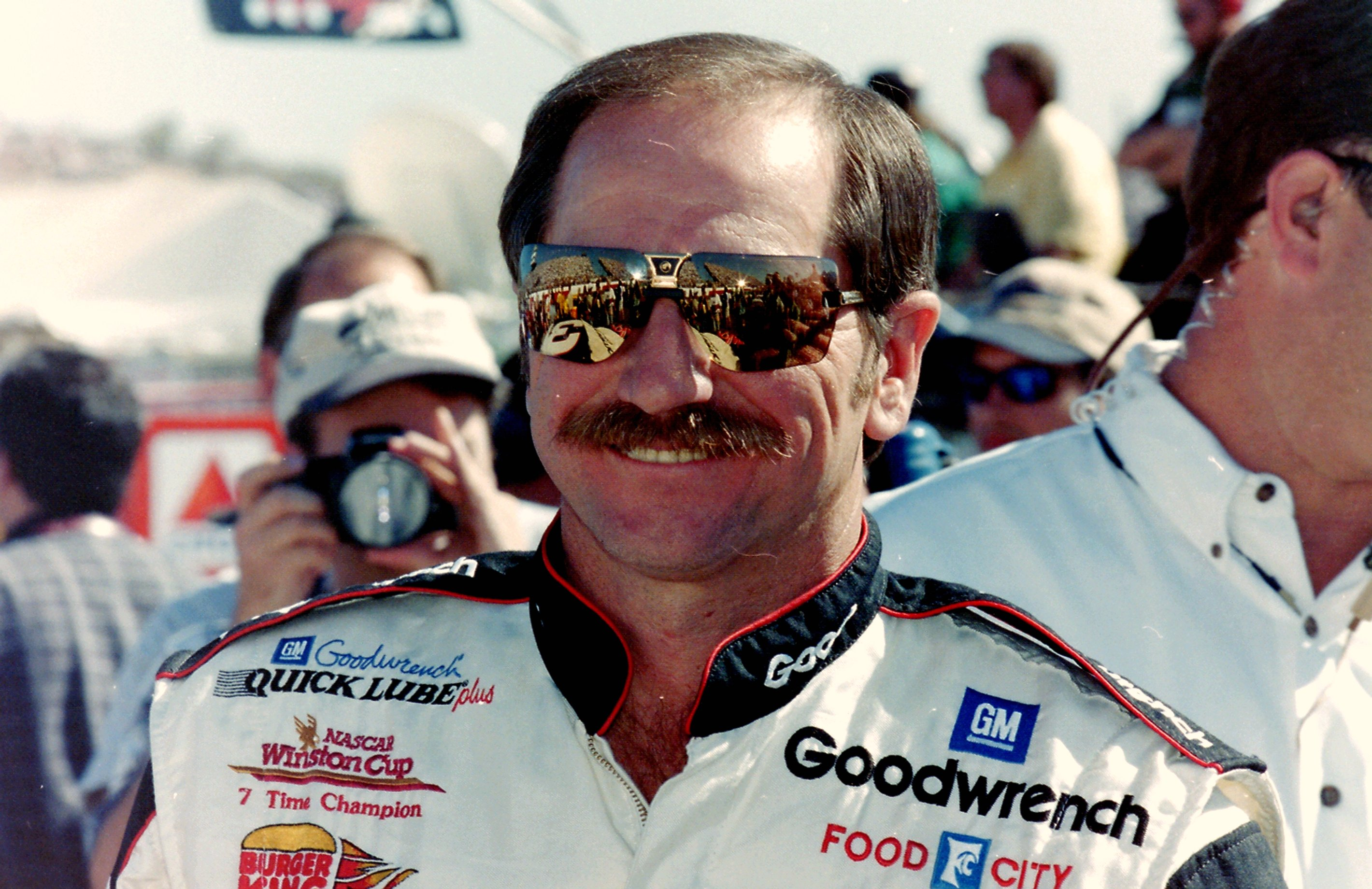
Dale Earnhardt came in second behind Labonte by 265 points.

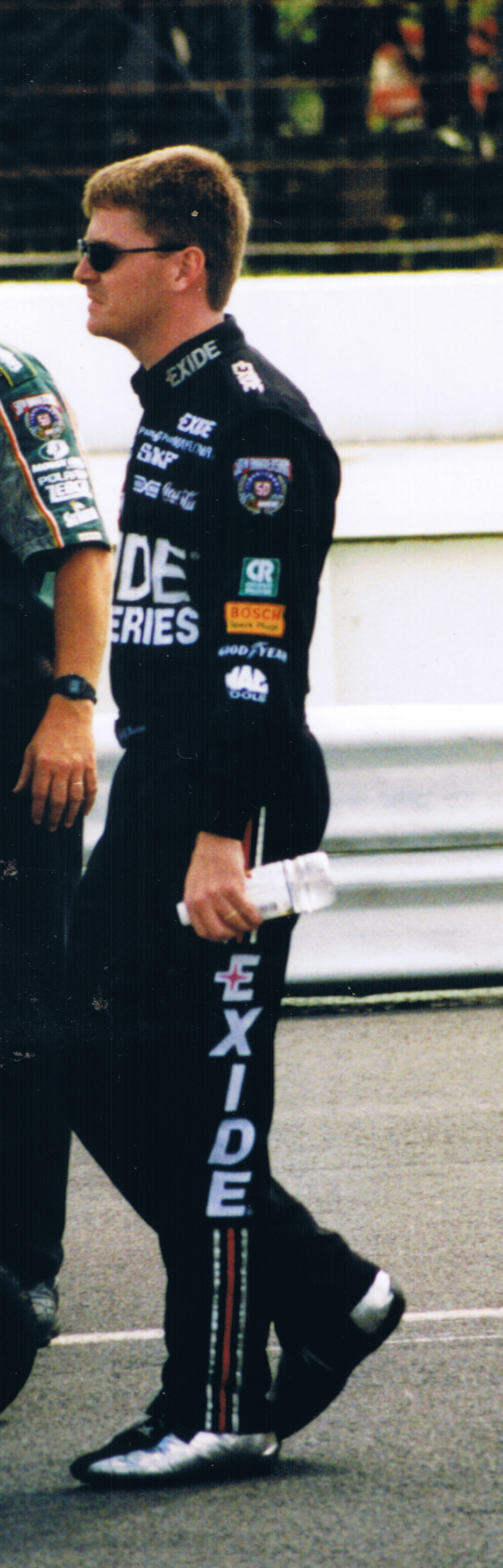
Jeff Burton finished third in the championship.

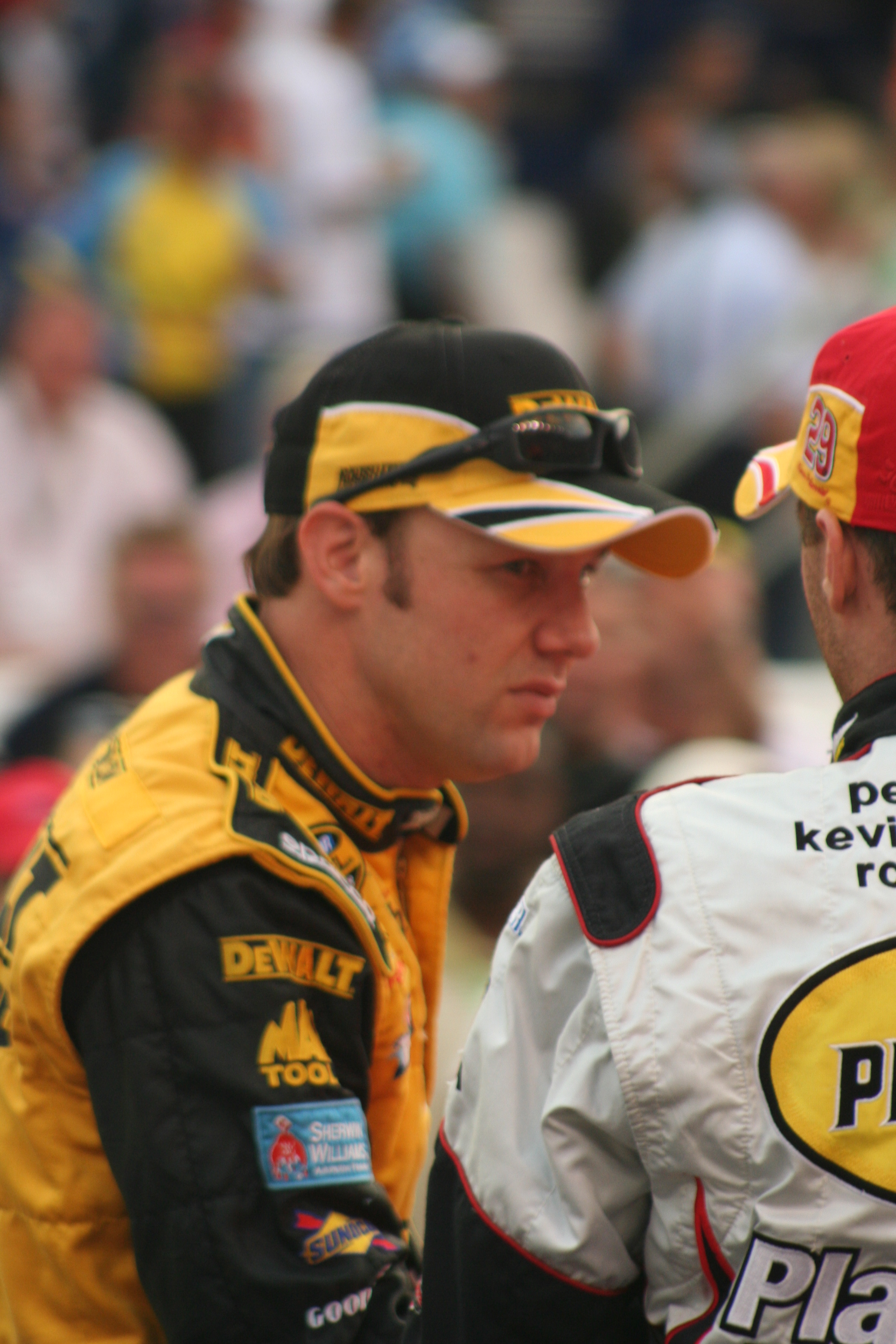
Matt Kenseth, (pictured in 2007) was the NASCAR Rookie of the Year.

The 2000 NASCAR Winston Cup Series was the 52nd season of professional stock car racing in the United States, and was the 29th modern-era Cup series. The season began on February 13 and ended on November 20. Joe Gibbs Racing driver Bobby Labonte was crowned champion at season's end. The NASCAR Manufacturers' Championship was won by Ford as they captured 14 wins and 234 points to better Pontiac's 11 wins and 213 points. Chevrolet finished third with nine wins and 199 points.

The season was marred by tragedy when Adam Petty and Kenny Irwin Jr. were killed in separate accidents at New Hampshire International Raceway.

This was the final season for three-time Winston Cup Champion Darrell Waltrip. Also, this would unexpectedly be the final full-time season for seven-time Winston Cup champion Dale Earnhardt, who was killed the following year in the season-opening Daytona 500.

The 2000 season also marked the final one for various networks that carried NASCAR racing. Because of the new television deal struck on December 15, 1999, it would be the last year for a multitude of these long-time broadcasters. NASCAR on CBS broadcast the final races of its twenty-two-season partnership, ending with the Pepsi 400 at Daytona. NASCAR on TNN and NASCAR on TBS ended their time in the Winston Cup Series; the former's run of ten seasons came to an end at the Checker Auto Parts/Dura Lube 500 at Phoenix, while the latter's abruptly ceased at eighteen seasons following the UAW-GM Quality 500 at Lowe's Motor Speedway (TBS had initially won rights for the new deal, but was replaced by TNT). NASCAR on ESPN, alongside its affiliated programming with ESPN on ABC, ended its initial run of covering NASCAR's top series (both networks returned during the 2007 season); ESPN's first run of twenty seasons concluded with the NAPA 500 at Atlanta, while ABC's then twenty-five nonconsecutive seasons with the sport ended with the Brickyard 400 at Indianapolis.

== Teams and drivers ==
=== Complete schedule ===
Manufacturer	Team	No.	Race driver	Crew chief
Chevrolet	Andy Petree Racing	33	Joe Nemechek	Danny Gill
Chevrolet	Andy Petree Racing	55	Kenny Wallace	Jimmy Elledge
Chevrolet	Dale Earnhardt, Inc.	1	Steve Park	Paul Andrews
Chevrolet	Dale Earnhardt, Inc.	8	Dale Earnhardt Jr. (R)	Tony Eury
Chevrolet	Hendrick Motorsports	5	Terry Labonte 32	Gary DeHart
Chevrolet	Hendrick Motorsports	5	Todd Bodine 1	Gary DeHart
Chevrolet	Hendrick Motorsports	5	Ron Hornaday Jr. 1	Gary DeHart
Chevrolet	Hendrick Motorsports	24	Jeff Gordon	Robbie Loomis
Chevrolet	Hendrick Motorsports	25	Jerry Nadeau	Tony Furr
Chevrolet	Joe Bessey Racing	60	Geoff Bodine 16	Jim Long
Chevrolet	Joe Bessey Racing	60	Ted Musgrave 5	Jim Long
Chevrolet	Joe Bessey Racing	60	Dick Trickle 4	Jim Long
Chevrolet	Joe Bessey Racing	60	Rich Bickle 5	Jim Long
Chevrolet	Joe Bessey Racing	60	Joe Bessey 2	Jim Long
Chevrolet	Joe Bessey Racing	60	Hermie Sadler 2	Jim Long
Chevrolet	Marcis Auto Racing	71	Dave Marcis 30	Bob Marcis
Chevrolet	Marcis Auto Racing	71	R. K. Smith 2	Bob Marcis
Chevrolet	Marcis Auto Racing	71	Kerry Earnhardt 1	Bob Marcis
Chevrolet	Marcis Auto Racing	71	Dick Trickle 1	Bob Marcis
Chevrolet	Morgan–McClure Motorsports	4	Bobby Hamilton	David Ifft
Chevrolet	Richard Childress Racing	3	Dale Earnhardt	Kevin Hamlin
Chevrolet	Richard Childress Racing	31	Mike Skinner	Larry McReynolds
Chevrolet	Team SABCO	40	Sterling Marlin	Scott Eggleston
Chevrolet	Mattei Motorsports	7	Michael Waltrip	Bobby Kennedy
Ford	Bill Elliott Racing	94	Bill Elliott 32	Mike Ford
Ford	Bill Elliott Racing	94	David Green 2	Mike Ford
Ford	Brett Bodine Racing	11	Brett Bodine	Mike Hillman
Ford	Donlavey Racing	90	Ed Berrier 18	Craig Huartson
Ford	Donlavey Racing	90	Brian Simo 2	Craig Huartson
Ford	Donlavey Racing	90	Hut Stricklin 14	Craig Huartson
Ford	Galaxy Motorsports	75	Wally Dallenbach Jr.	Newt Moore
Ford	Haas-Carter Motorsports	26	Jimmy Spencer	Donnie Wingo
Ford	Haas-Carter Motorsports	66	Darrell Waltrip	Larry Carter
Ford	Jasper Motorsports	77	Robert Pressley	Ryan Pemberton
Ford	Melling Racing	9	Stacy Compton 33 (R)	Chad Knaus; Jerry Pitts
Ford	Melling Racing	9	Bobby Hillin Jr. 1	Chad Knaus; Jerry Pitts
Ford	Penske-Kranefuss Racing	2	Rusty Wallace	Robin Pemberton
Ford	Penske-Kranefuss Racing	12	Jeremy Mayfield 32	Peter Sospenzo
Ford	Penske-Kranefuss Racing	12	Kyle Petty 1	Peter Sospenzo
Ford	Penske-Kranefuss Racing	12	Tom Hubert 1	Peter Sospenzo
Ford	PPI Motorsports	32	Scott Pruett (R)	Scott Houston
Ford	Robert Yates Racing	28	Ricky Rudd	Michael McSwain
Ford	Robert Yates Racing	88	Dale Jarrett	Todd Parrott
Ford	Roush Racing	6	Mark Martin	Jimmy Fennig
Ford	Roush Racing	16	Kevin Lepage	Pat Tryson
Ford	Roush Racing	17	Matt Kenseth (R)	Robbie Reiser
Ford	Roush Racing	97	Chad Little 27	Jeff Hammond
Ford	Roush Racing	97	Kurt Busch 7	Jeff Hammond
Ford	Roush Racing	99	Jeff Burton	Frank Stoddard
Ford	Wood Brothers Racing	21	Elliott Sadler	Eddie Wood
Pontiac	A. J. Foyt Racing	14	Mike Bliss (R) 4	Philippe Lopez 25; Terry Wooden 4 Waddell Wilson 1
Pontiac	A. J. Foyt Racing	14	Dick Trickle 2	Philippe Lopez 25; Terry Wooden 4 Waddell Wilson 1
Pontiac	A. J. Foyt Racing	14	Rick Mast 28	Philippe Lopez 25; Terry Wooden 4 Waddell Wilson 1
Pontiac	Bill Davis Racing	22	Ward Burton	Tommy Baldwin Jr.
Pontiac	Bill Davis Racing	93	Dave Blaney (R)	Doug Randolph
Pontiac	Eel River Racing	27	Jeff Fuller (R) 7	Barry Dodson
Pontiac	Eel River Racing	27	Mike Bliss (R) 27	Barry Dodson
Pontiac	Joe Gibbs Racing	18	Bobby Labonte	Jimmy Makar
Pontiac	Joe Gibbs Racing	20	Tony Stewart	Greg Zipadelli
Pontiac	MB2 Motorsports	36	Ken Schrader	Sammy Johns
Pontiac	Petty Enterprises	43	John Andretti	Greg Steadman
Pontiac	Petty Enterprises	44	Kyle Petty 21	Bobby Leslie; Chris Hussey
Pontiac	Petty Enterprises	44	Steve Grissom 13	Bobby Leslie; Chris Hussey
Pontiac	Tyler Jet Motorsports	10	Johnny Benson	James Ince

=== Limited schedule ===
Manufacturer	Team	No.	Race driver	Crew chief	Rounds
Chevrolet	Andy Petree Racing	35	Geoff Bodine	Chris Carrier	1
Chevrolet	Bill Baird Motorsports	52	Bill Baird		2
Chevrolet	Bobby Hamilton Racing	57	Bobby Hamilton Jr.		1
Chevrolet	Coulter Racing	61	Rich Bickle		1
Chevrolet	Xpress Motorsports	61	Tim Sauter		1
Chevrolet	Gerhart Racing	89	Bobby Gerhart		1
Chevrolet	AC Motorsports	89	Austin Cameron		1
Chevrolet	Jim & Judie Motorsports	65	Dan Pardus		1
Chevrolet	JKR Motorsports	34	David Green		1
Chevrolet	Cicci-Welliver Racing	34	Todd Bodine		1
Chevrolet	Larry Hedrick Motorsports	41	Rick Mast	Philippe Lopez	6
Chevrolet	Larry Hedrick Motorsports	41	Gary Bradberry	Philippe Lopez	3
Chevrolet	LJ Racing	91	Andy Hillenburg		1
Chevrolet	LJ Racing	91	Todd Bodine		3
Chevrolet	LJ Racing	91	Larry Gunselman		1
Chevrolet	LJ Racing	91	Blaise Alexander		2
Chevrolet	Marcis Auto Racing	72	Jim Sauter	Bob Marcis	1
Chevrolet	Marcis Auto Racing	72	Dwayne Leik	Bob Marcis	2
Chevrolet	Midwest Transit Racing	50	Ricky Craven	Greg Connors	26
Chevrolet	NEMCO Motorsports	87	Ron Fellows	Brian Pattie	1
Chevrolet	Norm Benning Racing	84	Norm Benning		3
Chevrolet	Petty-Huggins Motorsports	96	Greg Sacks		1
Chevrolet	Team SABCO	42	Kenny Irwin Jr.	Tony Glover	17
Chevrolet	Team SABCO	01	Ted Musgrave	Tony Glover	14
Chevrolet	Team SABCO	01	P. J. Jones	Tony Glover	1
Chevrolet	Team SABCO	01	Bobby Hamilton Jr.	Tony Glover	1
Ford	Evernham Motorsports	19	Casey Atwood	Chad Knaus 2 Patrick Donahue 1	3
Ford	Fenley-Moore Motorsports	15	Derrike Cope	Joey Knuckles	4
Ford	Fenley-Moore Motorsports	15	Ted Musgrave	Joey Knuckles	2
Ford	Haas-Carter Motorsports	46	Todd Bodine		1
Ford	Hover Motorsports	80	Morgan Shepherd		1
Ford	MacPherson Motorsports	98	Jeff Fuller	Vic Kangas	1
Ford	MacPherson Motorsports	98	Geoff Bodine	Vic Kangas	1
Ford	Mansion Motorsports	85	Carl Long	Keith Montgomery	10
Ford	Mansion Motorsports	85	Darrell Waltrip	Keith Montgomery	1
Ford	Penske-Kranefuss Racing	02	Ryan Newman	Matt Borland	1
Ford	PPI Motorsports	96	Andy Houston	Joe Garone	5
Ford	Sadler Brothers Racing	95	David Keith		2
Ford	Spencer Motor Ventures	23	Boris Said	Richard Broome	3
Ford	TriStar Motorsports	48	Stanton Barrett		1
Ford	Team Menard	13	Robby Gordon	Mark Tudor	23
Ford	Team Menard	13	P. J. Jones	Mark Tudor	1
Pontiac	A. J. Foyt Racing	41	Larry Foyt		1
Pontiac	Bill Davis Racing	23	Scott Wimmer		1
Pontiac	Buckshot Racing	00	Buckshot Jones		1
Chevrolet Pontiac	Petty Enterprises	45	Adam Petty	Chris Hussey	1
Chevrolet Pontiac	Petty Enterprises	45	Kyle Petty	Chris Hussey	2

== Schedule ==
No.	Race title	Track	Location	Date
	Bud Shootout Qualifier	Daytona International Speedway	Daytona Beach, Florida	February 13
	Bud Shootout	Daytona International Speedway	Daytona Beach, Florida	February 13
	Gatorade 125s	Daytona International Speedway	Daytona Beach, Florida	February 17
1	Daytona 500	Daytona International Speedway	Daytona Beach, Florida	February 20
2	Dura Lube/Kmart 400	Rockingham Speedway	Rockingham, North Carolina	February 27
3	CarsDirect.com 400	Las Vegas Motor Speedway	Las Vegas, Nevada	March 5
4	Cracker Barrel Old Country Store 500	Atlanta Motor Speedway	Hampton, Georgia	March 12
5	Mall.com 400	Darlington Raceway	Darlington, South Carolina	March 19
6	Food City 500	Bristol Motor Speedway	Bristol, Tennessee	March 26
7	DirecTV 500	Texas Motor Speedway	Fort Worth, Texas	April 2
8	Goody's Body Pain 500	Martinsville Speedway	Ridgeway, Virginia	April 9
9	DieHard 500	Talladega Superspeedway	Lincoln, Alabama	April 16
10	NAPA Auto Parts 500	California Speedway	Fontana, California	April 30
11	Pontiac Excitement 400	Richmond International Raceway	Richmond, Virginia	May 6
	No Bull 25 Shootout	Charlotte Motor Speedway	Concord, North Carolina	May 19
	Winston Open	Charlotte Motor Speedway	Concord, North Carolina	May 20
	No Bull Sprint	Charlotte Motor Speedway	Concord, North Carolina	May 20
	The Winston	Charlotte Motor Speedway	Concord, North Carolina	May 20
12	Coca-Cola 600	Charlotte Motor Speedway	Concord, North Carolina	May 28
13	MBNA Platinum 400	Dover Downs International Speedway	Dover, Delaware	June 4
14	Kmart 400	Michigan Speedway	Cambridge Township, Michigan	June 11
15	Pocono 500	Pocono Raceway	Long Pond, Pennsylvania	June 19
16	Save Mart/Kragen 350	Sears Point Raceway	Sonoma, California	June 25
17	Pepsi 400	Daytona International Speedway	Daytona Beach, Florida	July 1
18	thatlook.com 300	New Hampshire International Speedway	Loudon, New Hampshire	July 9
19	Pennsylvania 500	Pocono Raceway	Long Pond, Pennsylvania	July 23
20	Brickyard 400	Indianapolis Motor Speedway	Speedway, Indiana	August 5
21	Global Crossing @ The Glen	Watkins Glen International	Watkins Glen, New York	August 13
22	Pepsi 400 presented by Meijer	Michigan Speedway	Cambridge Township, Michigan	August 20
23	goracing.com 500 presented by SkyTel	Bristol Motor Speedway	Bristol, Tennessee	August 26
24	Pepsi Southern 500 presented by Kmart	Darlington Raceway	Darlington, South Carolina	September 3
25	Chevrolet Monte Carlo 400	Richmond International Raceway	Richmond, Virginia	September 9
26	Dura Lube 300 sponsored by Kmart	New Hampshire International Speedway	Loudon, New Hampshire	September 17
27	MBNA.com 400	Dover Downs International Speedway	Dover, Delaware	September 24
28	NAPA Autocare 500	Martinsville Speedway	Ridgeway, Virginia	October 1
29	UAW-GM Quality 500	Charlotte Motor Speedway	Concord, North Carolina	October 8
30	Winston 500 presented by UPS	Talladega Superspeedway	Lincoln, Alabama	October 15
31	Pop Secret Microwave Popcorn 400	Rockingham Speedway	Rockingham, North Carolina	October 22
32	Checker Auto Parts/Dura Lube 500k	Phoenix International Raceway	Avondale, Arizona	November 5
33	Pennzoil 400 presented by Discount Auto Parts	Homestead–Miami Speedway	Homestead, Florida	November 12
34	NAPA 500	Atlanta Motor Speedway	Hampton, Georgia	November 20

== Results ==
No.	Race	Pole position	Most laps led	Winning driver	Manufacturer	Report
	Bud Shootout Qualifier	Ricky Craven	Dale Jarrett	Dale Jarrett	Ford	Report
	Bud Shootout	Mark Martin	Sterling Marlin	Dale Jarrett	Ford	Report
	Gatorade 125#1	Dale Jarrett	Bill Elliott	Bill Elliott	Ford	Report
	Gatorade 125#2	Ricky Rudd	Ricky Rudd	Ricky Rudd	Ford	Report
1	Daytona 500	Dale Jarrett	Dale Jarrett	Dale Jarrett	Ford	Report
2	Dura Lube/Kmart 400	Rusty Wallace	Bobby Labonte	Bobby Labonte	Pontiac	Report
3	CarsDirect.com 400	Ricky Rudd	Jeff Burton	Jeff Burton	Ford	Report
4	Cracker Barrel Old Country Store 500	Dale Jarrett	Mike Skinner	Dale Earnhardt	Chevrolet	Report
5	Mall.com 400	Jeff Gordon	Ward Burton	Ward Burton	Pontiac	Report
6	Food City 500	Steve Park	Jeff Gordon	Rusty Wallace	Ford	Report
7	DirecTV 500	Terry Labonte	Dale Earnhardt Jr.	Dale Earnhardt Jr.	Chevrolet	Report
8	Goody's Body Pain 500	Rusty Wallace	Rusty Wallace	Mark Martin	Ford	Report
9	DieHard 500	Jeremy Mayfield	Mark Martin	Jeff Gordon	Chevrolet	Report
10	NAPA Auto Parts 500	Mike Skinner	Matt Kenseth	Jeremy Mayfield	Ford	Report
11	Pontiac Excitement 400	Rusty Wallace	Rusty Wallace	Dale Earnhardt Jr.	Chevrolet	Report
	No Bull 25 Race 1	Ricky Craven	Jerry Nadeau	Jerry Nadeau	Chevrolet	Report
	No Bull 25 Race 2	Mike Skinner	Steve Park	Jimmy Spencer	Ford	Report
	Winston Open	Jerry Nadeau	Jerry Nadeau	Steve Park	Chevrolet	Report
	No Bull Sprint	Mike Skinner	Mike Skinner	Jerry Nadeau	Chevrolet	Report
	The Winston	Bill Elliott	Bill Elliott	Dale Earnhardt Jr.	Chevrolet	Report
12	Coca-Cola 600	Dale Earnhardt Jr.	Dale Earnhardt Jr.	Matt Kenseth	Ford	Report
13	MBNA Platinum 400	Rusty Wallace	Tony Stewart	Tony Stewart	Pontiac	Report
14	Kmart 400	Bobby Labonte	Jeremy Mayfield	Tony Stewart	Pontiac	Report
15	Pocono 500	Rusty Wallace	Rusty Wallace	Jeremy Mayfield	Ford	Report
16	Save Mart/Kragen 350	Rusty Wallace	Jeff Gordon	Jeff Gordon	Chevrolet	Report
17	Pepsi 400	Dale Jarrett	Dale Jarrett	Jeff Burton	Ford	Report
18	thatlook.com 300	Rusty Wallace	Tony Stewart	Tony Stewart	Pontiac	Report
19	Pennsylvania 500	Tony Stewart	Dale Jarrett	Rusty Wallace	Ford	Report
20	Brickyard 400	Ricky Rudd	Rusty Wallace	Bobby Labonte	Pontiac	Report
21	Global Crossing @ The Glen	Bobby Labonte	Steve Park	Steve Park	Chevrolet	Report
22	Pepsi 400 presented by Meijer	Dale Earnhardt Jr.	Rusty Wallace	Rusty Wallace	Ford	Report
23	goracing.com 500	Rusty Wallace	Rusty Wallace	Rusty Wallace	Ford	Report
24	Pepsi Southern 500	Jeremy Mayfield	Jeremy Mayfield	Bobby Labonte	Pontiac	Report
25	Chevrolet Monte Carlo 400	Jeff Burton	Jeff Burton	Jeff Gordon	Chevrolet	Report
26	Dura Lube 300 sponsored by Kmart	Bobby Labonte	Jeff Burton	Jeff Burton	Ford	Report
27	MBNA.com 400	Jeremy Mayfield	Tony Stewart	Tony Stewart	Pontiac	Report
28	NAPA Autocare 500	Tony Stewart	Jeff Burton	Tony Stewart	Pontiac	Report
29	UAW-GM Quality 500	Jeff Gordon	Ricky Rudd	Bobby Labonte	Pontiac	Report
30	Winston 500	Joe Nemechek	Bill Elliott	Dale Earnhardt	Chevrolet	Report
31	Pop Secret Microwave Popcorn 400	Jeremy Mayfield	Jeremy Mayfield	Dale Jarrett	Ford	Report
32	Checker Auto Parts/Dura Lube 500k	Rusty Wallace	Jeff Burton	Jeff Burton	Ford	Report
33	Pennzoil 400 presented by Discount Auto Parts	Steve Park	Tony Stewart	Tony Stewart	Pontiac	Report
34	NAPA 500	Jeff Gordon	Jerry Nadeau	Jerry Nadeau	Chevrolet	Report

=== Bud Shootout ===
The Bud Shootout, an exhibition race for all Pole Award winners from the previous season, was held February 13 at Daytona International Speedway. Mark Martin drew the pole. The race was broadcast on CBS.

Top 10 results

1. #88 - Dale Jarrett
2. #24 - Jeff Gordon
3. #40 - Sterling Marlin
4. #20 - Tony Stewart
5. #16 - Kevin Lepage
6. #36 - Ken Schrader
7. #2 - Rusty Wallace
8. #33 - Joe Nemechek
9. #42 - Kenny Irwin Jr.
10. #22 - Ward Burton
- Ricky Rudd suffered a spectacular flip at the checkered flag when he was tapped by Sterling Marlin when Marlin ran into Bobby Labonte. Everyone involved walked away uninjured.

=== Gatorade 125s ===
The Gatorade Twin 125s were run on February 17 at Daytona International Speedway. Dale Jarrett and Ricky Rudd were the polesitters for races 1 and 2, respectively. The Gatorade Twin 125s were broadcast tape-delayed on February 19 on CBS after the NASCAR Busch Series race.

Race one top 10 results

1. #94 - Bill Elliott*
2. #88 - Dale Jarrett
3. #2 - Rusty Wallace
4. #20 - Tony Stewart
5. #6 - Mark Martin
6. #24 - Jeff Gordon
7. #18 - Bobby Labonte
8. #32 - Scott Pruett
9. #13 - Robby Gordon
10. #12 - Jeremy Mayfield
- This would be the 1st checkered flag of any kind for Bill Elliott since his 40th career win in the 1994 Southern 500 at Darlington.

Race two top 10 results

1. #28 - Ricky Rudd
2. #31 - Mike Skinner
3. #22 - Ward Burton
4. #8 - Dale Earnhardt Jr.
5. #7 - Michael Waltrip
6. #15 - Derrike Cope
7. #99 - Jeff Burton
8. #33 - Joe Nemechek
9. #42 - Kenny Irwin Jr.
10. #25 - Jerry Nadeau
- Dale Earnhardt finished 11th in duel 2, making this the first time since 1989 that Earnhardt failed to win one of the Daytona 500 duel races. He would have some very negative comments about the new aerodynamics package following this race, and after the finish of the Daytona 500.

=== 42nd Daytona 500 ===
The 2000 Daytona 500 was held February 20 at Daytona International Speedway. Dale Jarrett won the pole. The race was televised by CBS.

Top ten results

1. #88 - Dale Jarrett*
2. #99 - Jeff Burton
3. #94 - Bill Elliott
4. #2 - Rusty Wallace
5. #6 - Mark Martin
6. #18 - Bobby Labonte
7. #5 - Terry Labonte
8. #22 - Ward Burton
9. #36 - Ken Schrader
10. #17 - Matt Kenseth*

Failed to qualify: Geoff Bodine (#60), Norm Benning (#84), Jim Sauter (#72), Dan Pardus (#65), Carl Long (#85), Stanton Barrett (#48), Bobby Gerhart (#89), Greg Sacks (#96), Brett Bodine (#11), Dave Marcis (#71), Andy Hillenburg (#91), Jeff Fuller (#27), Ricky Craven (#50), David Green (#34)

- Dale Jarrett won the Winston No Bull 5 Million Dollar Bonus.
- As of 2022, Dale Jarrett is the last driver to win the Daytona 500 from the pole.
- This would be the 1st time since 1989 that Dale Earnhardt failed to win any NASCAR race in Daytona Speedweeks. This would also be the first time in his career that he failed to finish in the top-10 in all of the races during Speedweeks. He didn't race in the Bud Shootout, he finished 11th in the 1st race of the Gatorade Twin 125s, and he would finish 21st in this race.
- This race was the start of major controversy due to the new aerodynamics package NASCAR officials made for both the Daytona and Talladega races this year. This resulted in what is often considered to be one of the worst Daytona 500s in history, as the race only saw 9 lead changes, and the majority of the race was single file racing, almost 2 full car lengths apart per car. The entire 2000 Speedweeks saw a total of just 14 lead changes. Dale Earnhardt would be very vocal about the negativity of the aerodynamics package following this race.
- This was the last Daytona 500 to be televised by CBS, and thus the last 500 broadcasts for Buddy Baker and Ned Jarrett.
- Dave Marcis failed to qualify, ending his streak of 32 consecutive Daytona 500 starts, dating back to 1968.
- Driving a solid-white Pontiac for Tyler Jet Motorsports with last-minute sponsorship from Lycos, Inc., Johnny Benson was in the lead with less than 10 laps to go and looked to be en route to his first Cup Series victory. After a late caution flag and restart, Dale Jarrett and Jeff Burton both passed him with four laps to go. Jarrett would wind up winning the race under caution, and Benson finished 12th.

=== Dura Lube/Kmart 400 ===
The Dura Lube/Kmart 400 was held February 27 at North Carolina Speedway. Rusty Wallace won the pole.

Top ten results

1. #18 - Bobby Labonte
2. #3 - Dale Earnhardt
3. #22 - Ward Burton
4. #20 - Tony Stewart
5. #88 - Dale Jarrett 1 lap down
6. #28 - Ricky Rudd 1 lap down
7. #12 - Jeremy Mayfield 1 lap down
8. #6 - Mark Martin 1 lap down
9. #1 - Steve Park 1 lap down
10. #24 - Jeff Gordon 1 lap down

Failed to qualify: Ricky Craven (#50), Scott Pruett (#32), Dave Blaney (#93), Mike Bliss (#14)

=== CarsDirect.com 400 ===
The CarsDirect.com 400 was held March 5 at Las Vegas Motor Speedway. Ricky Rudd won the pole.

Top 10 results

1. #99 - Jeff Burton*
2. #20 - Tony Stewart
3. #6 - Mark Martin
4. #94 - Bill Elliott
5. #18 - Bobby Labonte
6. #10 - Johnny Benson
7. #88 - Dale Jarrett
8. #3 - Dale Earnhardt
9. #33 - Joe Nemechek
10. #8 - Dale Earnhardt Jr.

Failed to qualify: Rick Mast (#41), Mike Bliss (#14), Ed Berrier (#90), Brett Bodine (#11), Dave Marcis (#71), Austin Cameron (#89)

- Jeff Burton had also won the No Bull 5 Million Dollar Bonus.
- The race was shortened to 148 laps due to rain.

=== Cracker Barrel Old Country Store 500 ===
The Cracker Barrel Old Country Store 500 was held March 12 at Atlanta Motor Speedway. Dale Jarrett won the pole.

Top ten results

1. #3 - Dale Earnhardt*
2. #18 - Bobby Labonte
3. #6 - Mark Martin
4. #1 - Steve Park
5. #33 - Joe Nemechek
6. #97 - Chad Little
7. #91 - Todd Bodine
8. #22 - Ward Burton 1 lap down
9. #24 - Jeff Gordon 1 lap down
10. #94 - Bill Elliott 1 lap down

Failed to qualify: Dave Marcis (#71), Ed Berrier (#90), Johnny Benson (#10), Mike Bliss (#14), Robby Gordon (#13)

- The race was highlighted with a photo finish by Dale Earnhardt over Bobby Labonte at a margin of 0.010 seconds.
- This was Earnhardt's 75th career NASCAR Winston Cup win and his final win at a non-restrictor plate track. Earnhardt also became the third driver to win on both configurations of Atlanta Motor Speedway, the others being Bobby Labonte and Jeff Gordon.
- As of today, with this win in the year 2000, Dale Earnhardt would be 1st and only driver in NASCAR history to score at least 1 win in 4 consecutive decades. He scored his 1st career win in 1979 at Bristol, and then followed it up with 38 wins in the 1980s, and 35 wins in the 1990s.
- Mike Skinner led a race-high 191 laps and looked as if he would capture his first Winston Cup points win when an engine failure dropped him out of the race while leading with 20 laps to go. Skinner would finish 30th.

=== Mall.com 400 ===
The Mall.com 400 was held March 19 at Darlington Raceway. Jeff Gordon won the pole.

Top ten results

1. #22 - Ward Burton*
2. #88 - Dale Jarrett
3. #3 - Dale Earnhardt
4. #20 - Tony Stewart
5. #99 - Jeff Burton
6. #17 - Matt Kenseth
7. #4 - Bobby Hamilton
8. #24 - Jeff Gordon
9. #6 - Mark Martin
10. #16 - Kevin Lepage

Failed to qualify: Derrike Cope (#15), Ricky Craven (#50), Scott Pruett (#32), Wally Dallenbach Jr. (#75), Ed Berrier (#90)

- This was Pontiac's first win at Darlington since 1963 by Joe Weatherly.
- This was Ward Burton's first Cup victory in 131 races, dating back to his first career victory at Rockingham in October 1995.
- This win marked the first time that Ward and Jeff Burton each won a race in the same season.

=== Food City 500 ===
The Food City 500 was held March 26 at Bristol Motor Speedway. Steve Park won the pole.

Top ten results

1. #2 - Rusty Wallace*
2. #10 - Johnny Benson
3. #22 - Ward Burton
4. #12 - Jeremy Mayfield
5. #5 - Terry Labonte
6. #18 - Bobby Labonte
7. #1 - Steve Park
8. #24 - Jeff Gordon
9. #99 - Jeff Burton
10. #40 - Sterling Marlin

Failed to qualify: Dave Marcis (#71), Ricky Craven (#50), Ed Berrier (#90), Scott Pruett (#32)

- On lap 390, Jeff Gordon ran over one of Steve Park's old right-side tires that had been left on pit road, ending his chances to win. This incident led to the rule change that pit crews have to bring the right-side tires back to the pit wall during a pit stop.
- Rusty Wallace became the 10th driver to win 50+ NASCAR races, and the first to do so since Dale Earnhardt in 1991.

=== DirecTV 500 ===
The DirecTV 500 was held April 2 at Texas Motor Speedway. Terry Labonte won the pole.

Top ten results

1. #8 - Dale Earnhardt Jr.*
2. #99 - Jeff Burton
3. #18 - Bobby Labonte
4. #2 - Rusty Wallace
5. #16 - Kevin Lepage
6. #12 - Jeremy Mayfield
7. #3 - Dale Earnhardt
8. #5 - Terry Labonte
9. #20 - Tony Stewart
10. #28 - Ricky Rudd

Failed to qualify: Robby Gordon (#13), Dave Marcis (#71), Wally Dallenbach Jr. (#75), Kyle Petty (#44), Todd Bodine (#91)

- 19-year-old Adam Petty made his only career Cup Series start in this race, becoming the first fourth-generation athlete in professional sports history. Adam qualified 33rd and finished 40th with a blown engine. His great-grandfather, NASCAR pioneer Lee Petty, lived to see Adam race in NASCAR's top level. Lee would die just three days later on April 5, at the age of 86.
- This was Dale Earnhardt Jr.'s first career Cup Series victory, coming in his 12th Cup Series start.
- Kyle Petty later relieved an injured Elliott Sadler, who suffered shoulder bruising after a cut tire on lap 119. The tire tore through the car's fender and the tire hit his shoulder several times.

=== Goody's Body Pain 500 ===
The Goody's Body Pain 500 was held April 9 at Martinsville Speedway. Rusty Wallace won the pole.

Top ten results

1. #6 - Mark Martin
2. #99 - Jeff Burton
3. #7 - Michael Waltrip
4. #24 - Jeff Gordon
5. #88 - Dale Jarrett
6. #20 - Tony Stewart
7. #12 - Jeremy Mayfield
8. #94 - Bill Elliott
9. #3 - Dale Earnhardt
10. #2 - Rusty Wallace*

Failed to qualify: Wally Dallenbach Jr. (#75), Rick Mast (#14), Dave Marcis (#71), Ed Berrier (#90)

- This race had 17 cautions for 116 laps, season highs for the 2000 season.
- Rusty Wallace dominated, leading 343 of the race's 500 laps, but with 64 laps to go, eventual winner Mark Martin passed Wallace and led until the finish.
- This race was dedicated to the memory of Lee Petty, who died on April 5 due to an abdominal aortic aneurysm. He was 86 years old.

=== DieHard 500 ===
The DieHard 500 was held April 16 at Talladega Superspeedway. Jeremy Mayfield won the pole.

Top ten results

1. #24 - Jeff Gordon*
2. #31 - Mike Skinner
3. #3 - Dale Earnhardt
4. #42 - Kenny Irwin Jr.
5. #26 - Jimmy Spencer
6. #6 - Mark Martin
7. #5 - Terry Labonte
8. #40 - Sterling Marlin
9. #44 - Kyle Petty
10. #22 - Ward Burton

Failed to qualify: Brett Bodine (#11), Kevin Lepage (#16), Gary Bradberry* (#41), Rick Mast (#14), Elliott Sadler (#21)

- Gordon became the 11th driver, and the second driver of 2000, to win 50+ NASCAR races, joining Rusty Wallace who won three weeks prior to Bristol.
- This event marked the last race attempted by Larry Hedrick Motorsports, which failed to qualify with Gary Bradberry.
- Bud Moore Engineering made its final career start in this race, with Ted Musgrave finishing 35th after crashing out during the big one. The team would fold after failing to qualify for the Coca-Cola 600 at Charlotte the following month, Moore originally planned to attempt to bring the #15 car to qualify for the Pepsi 400 at Daytona in July, but later withdrew.

=== NAPA Auto Parts 500 ===
The NAPA Auto Parts 500 was held April 30 at California Speedway. Mike Skinner won the pole.

Top ten results

1. #12 - Jeremy Mayfield*
2. #18 - Bobby Labonte*
3. #17 - Matt Kenseth
4. #28 - Ricky Rudd
5. #99 - Jeff Burton
6. #22 - Ward Burton
7. #31 - Mike Skinner
8. #2 - Rusty Wallace
9. #88 - Dale Jarrett
10. #20 - Tony Stewart

Failed to qualify: Dave Marcis (#71), Ed Berrier (#90), Dwayne Leik (#72)

- Jeremy Mayfield was fined 151 points and crew chief Peter Sospenzo was fined and suspended after this race for a rules infraction related to the DieHard 500 at Talladega Superspeedway. NASCAR delayed the penalty in order to research the motive behind the infraction.
- Bobby Labonte took the points lead after gaining it at Darlington and losing it at Talladega. He would keep it for the remainder of 2000.
- Mayfield's victory made him the 10th different winner in the first 10 races of the season, a record that still stands to this day.

=== Pontiac Excitement 400 ===
The Pontiac Excitement 400 was held May 6 at Richmond International Raceway. Rusty Wallace won the pole.

Top ten results

1. #8 - Dale Earnhardt Jr.*
2. #5 - Terry Labonte
3. #88 - Dale Jarrett
4. #28 - Ricky Rudd
5. #2 - Rusty Wallace
6. #22 - Ward Burton
7. #99 - Jeff Burton
8. #20 - Tony Stewart
9. #94 - Bill Elliott
10. #3 - Dale Earnhardt

Failed to qualify: Rick Mast (#14), Darrell Waltrip (#66), Dave Marcis (#71), Ed Berrier (#90)

- Earnhardt Jr.'s victory made him the first repeat winner of 2000.
- This was Darrell Waltrip's first DNQ this season, having exhausted his past champion's provisionals.
- This race saw Geoff Bodine make his first Cup Series start since his horrific crash in the Truck Series race at Daytona in February. Bodine started an impressive 4th and finished 13th.

=== The Winston ===
The Winston, the all-star race for all past champions and recent winners, was held May 20 at Lowe's Motor Speedway.

Top ten results

1. #8 - Dale Earnhardt Jr.
2. #88 - Dale Jarrett
3. #3 - Dale Earnhardt
4. #25 - Jerry Nadeau
5. #99 - Jeff Burton
6. #5 - Terry Labonte
7. #2 - Rusty Wallace
8. #94 - Bill Elliott
9. #18 - Bobby Labonte
10. #22 - Ward Burton
- Earnhardt Jr. became the first driver to win an All-Star Race in his rookie season.
- This was the 16th and final All-Star race to feature Darrell Waltrip and Dale Earnhardt. They are also the only two drivers in NASCAR history to compete in the first 16 races of the Winston.

=== Coca-Cola 600 ===
The Coca-Cola 600 was held May 28 at Lowe's Motor Speedway. Dale Earnhardt Jr. won the pole.

Top ten results

1. #17 - Matt Kenseth*
2. #18 - Bobby Labonte
3. #3 - Dale Earnhardt
4. #8 - Dale Earnhardt Jr.
5. #88 - Dale Jarrett
6. #12 - Jeremy Mayfield
7. #31 - Mike Skinner
8. #2 - Rusty Wallace
9. #1 - Steve Park
10. #24 - Jeff Gordon

Failed to qualify: Ted Musgrave (#15), Steve Grissom (#44), Ed Berrier (#90), Darrell Waltrip (#66), Dave Marcis (#71)

- Carl Long originally qualified for the event, but gave up his spot for Darrell Waltrip to compete in his final Coca-Cola 600. Waltrip would drive the #85 Ford, finishing 14 laps down in 36th.
- The race was stopped on lap 254 by a 51-minute red flag due to rain.
- This was Kenseth's first career Cup Series victory, the first rookie ever to win the Coca-Cola 600.
- This would be the first time in NASCAR history that two rookies won in the same season, as Dale Earnhardt Jr. had won two races prior to Kenseth winning.
- Robby Gordon was competing in the Indianapolis 500, where the start was rain-delayed by three hours. P. J. Jones started in place of Gordon in the #13 Ford. After finishing 6th at Indy, Gordon decided to fly to Charlotte anyway, arriving during the red flag at lap 254 and drove the remainder of this race. The car finished 35th, 11 laps behind the leader.
- John Andretti, who was dealing with rib injuries suffered in a crash in The Winston, started the race in the #43 Pontiac. Andretti drove until lap 81 when he was relieved by Tim Fedewa. The car would finish 7 laps down in 31st.

=== MBNA Platinum 400 ===
The MBNA Platinum 400 was held June 4 at Dover Downs International Speedway. Rusty Wallace won the pole.

Top ten results

1. #20 - Tony Stewart*
2. #17 - Matt Kenseth
3. #18 - Bobby Labonte
4. #88 - Dale Jarrett
5. #28 - Ricky Rudd
6. #3 - Dale Earnhardt 1 lap down
7. #33 - Joe Nemechek 2 laps down
8. #22 - Ward Burton 2 laps down
9. #31 - Mike Skinner 2 laps down
10. #8 - Dale Earnhardt Jr. 2 laps down

Failed to qualify: Kyle Petty* (#44), Carl Long (#85)

- Stewart led 242 of 400 laps and moved up to 9th place in points.
- Kyle Petty actually ran this race for John Andretti, making the driver swap at the first caution. This was Kyle's first race since the death of his son Adam. The car would finish 13th, 2 laps down to the winner.

=== Kmart 400 ===
The Kmart 400 was held June 11 at Michigan Speedway. Bobby Labonte won the pole.

Top ten results

1. #20 - Tony Stewart
2. #3 - Dale Earnhardt
3. #18 - Bobby Labonte
4. #88 - Dale Jarrett
5. #77 - Robert Pressley
6. #22 - Ward Burton
7. #2 - Rusty Wallace
8. #94 - Bill Elliott
9. #43 - John Andretti
10. #40 - Sterling Marlin

Failed to qualify: Darrell Waltrip (#66), Ricky Craven (#50), Dave Marcis (#71)

- Elliott Sadler went for a wild ride in practice, flipping 12 times after blowing a tire on the front stretch. He was not injured.
- The race was shortened to 194 laps due to darkness caused by two rain delays. Due to the rain delay, race coverage was moved from CBS to TNN but retained the CBS announcer team and graphics.

=== Pocono 500 ===
The Pocono 500 was scheduled for June 18 but was held June 19 at Pocono Raceway due to rain. Rusty Wallace won the pole.

Top ten results

1. #12 - Jeremy Mayfield
2. #88 - Dale Jarrett
3. #28 - Ricky Rudd
4. #3 - Dale Earnhardt
5. #6 - Mark Martin
6. #20 - Tony Stewart
7. #99 - Jeff Burton
8. #24 - Jeff Gordon
9. #31 - Mike Skinner
10. #2 - Rusty Wallace

Failed to qualify: Darrell Waltrip (#66), Dwayne Leik (#72), Bill Baird (#52)

- This race is remembered for Mayfield moving Dale Earnhardt out of the way on the final turn of the final lap to take the win.

=== Save Mart/Kragen 350 ===
The Save Mart/Kragen 350 was held June 25 at Sears Point Raceway. Rusty Wallace won the pole.

Top ten results

1. #24 - Jeff Gordon*
2. #40 - Sterling Marlin
3. #6 - Mark Martin
4. #18 - Bobby Labonte
5. #28 - Ricky Rudd
6. #3 - Dale Earnhardt
7. #88 - Dale Jarrett
8. #25 - Jerry Nadeau
9. #13 - Robby Gordon
10. #20 - Tony Stewart

Failed to qualify: Rick Mast (#14), Geoff Bodine (#60), R. K. Smith (#71)

- This was Gordon's 6th consecutive road course victory, a record that still stands today.

=== Pepsi 400 ===
The Pepsi 400 was held July 1 at Daytona International Speedway. Dale Jarrett won the pole.

Top ten results

1. #99 - Jeff Burton
2. #88 - Dale Jarrett
3. #2 - Rusty Wallace
4. #6 - Mark Martin
5. #28 - Ricky Rudd
6. #20 - Tony Stewart
7. #22 - Ward Burton
8. #3 - Dale Earnhardt
9. #31 - Mike Skinner
10. #24 - Jeff Gordon

Failed to qualify: Brett Bodine (#11), Dave Marcis (#71), Robby Gordon (#13)

- Kenny Irwin Jr. made his final career Cup Series start in this race, finishing 22nd.
- Last Winston Cup race to be televised on CBS. CBS had been with NASCAR since the 1979 Daytona 500.

=== thatlook.com 300 ===
The thatlook.com 300 was held July 9 at New Hampshire International Speedway. Rusty Wallace won the pole. The weekend was marked by tragedy as Kenny Irwin Jr. was killed in a Turn 3 practice crash on July 7.

Top ten results

1. #20 - Tony Stewart*
2. #33 - Joe Nemechek
3. #6 - Mark Martin
4. #25 - Jerry Nadeau
5. #24 - Jeff Gordon
6. #3 - Dale Earnhardt
7. #88 - Dale Jarrett
8. #12 - Jeremy Mayfield
9. #18 - Bobby Labonte
10. #28 - Ricky Rudd

Failed to qualify: Dave Marcis (#71)

Withdrawn: Kenny Irwin Jr. (#42)

- The race was shortened to 273 laps due to rain.
- Race winner Tony Stewart would give the race trophy to Irwin's parents.
- Irwin's death happened on the same day it was announced that Chip Ganassi had purchased majority interest in the Felix Sabates team.
- Kenny Irwin's teammate on the SABCO team, Sterling Marlin, declined to run in qualifying following Irwin's death; choosing to use a provisional to enter the race. He finished 1 lap down to the leader in 25th.
- Felix Sabates would change the car number of the #42 team to #01 for the remainder of the season. Ted Musgrave, P. J. Jones, and Bobby Hamilton Jr. would finish the season driving for the team.

=== Pennsylvania 500 ===
The Pennsylvania 500 was held July 23 at Pocono Raceway. Tony Stewart won the pole.

Top ten results

1. #2 - Rusty Wallace
2. #99 - Jeff Burton
3. #24 - Jeff Gordon
4. #88 - Dale Jarrett
5. #17 - Matt Kenseth
6. #18 - Bobby Labonte
7. #31 - Mike Skinner
8. #14 - Rick Mast
9. #26 - Jimmy Spencer
10. #12 - Jeremy Mayfield

Failed to qualify: Geoff Bodine (#60), Carl Long (#85)

- Jeremy Mayfield was less than a lap away from the Pocono sweep when a cut tire sent him from the lead to 10th place.
- Terry Labonte had Rich Bickle relieve him at the first caution period, who drove to an 11th-place finish, on the lead lap.

=== Brickyard 400 ===
The Brickyard 400 was held August 5 at Indianapolis Motor Speedway. Ricky Rudd won the pole.

Top ten results

1. #18 - Bobby Labonte
2. #2 - Rusty Wallace*
3. #94 - Bill Elliott
4. #25 - Jerry Nadeau
5. #20 - Tony Stewart
6. #99 - Jeff Burton
7. #88 - Dale Jarrett
8. #3 - Dale Earnhardt
9. #31 - Mike Skinner
10. #32 - Scott Pruett

Failed to qualify: David Keith (#95), Rich Bickle (#61), Dave Marcis (#71), Robby Gordon (#13), Steve Grissom (#44), Bill Baird (#52)

- Rusty Wallace led a dominating 110 laps of the race's 160, but Bobby Labonte caught and passed Wallace to lead the last 15 laps and win the race.
- This race has the record for the fastest Brickyard 400, with only 2 cautions and an average speed of 155.912 mph.
- Terry Labonte was forced to miss this and the next race due to inner ear injuries suffered at Pocono, ending his streak of consecutive Cup Series starts at 655. This record would be broken by Ricky Rudd in 2002.
- Todd Bodine drove Labonte's #5 Chevy for this race, finishing 1 lap down in 15th.
- The race was ABC's last broadcast of the NASCAR Winston Cup Series until the 2007 fall Richmond race (in which the series was renamed to NASCAR Nextel Cup Series) as part of the ESPN group of networks.
- This race was held on what would have been the 31st birthday of Kenny Irwin Jr.; who was killed earlier in the season in a practice crash in New Hampshire, with the race being dedicated to his memory.

=== Global Crossing @ The Glen ===
The Global Crossing @ The Glen was held August 13 at Watkins Glen International. Due to qualifying being rained out, the starting lineup was set by owner's points, so Bobby Labonte was awarded pole position.

Top ten results

1. #1 - Steve Park*
2. #6 - Mark Martin
3. #99 - Jeff Burton
4. #13 - Robby Gordon
5. #18 - Bobby Labonte
6. #20 - Tony Stewart*
7. #88 - Dale Jarrett
8. #33 - Joe Nemechek
9. #75 - Wally Dallenbach Jr.
10. #17 - Matt Kenseth

Failed to qualify: Boris Said (#23), Scott Pruett (#32), R. K. Smith (#71), Brett Bodine (#11), Brian Simo (#90)

- This was Park's first career Winston Cup victory.
- Jeff Gordon and Tony Stewart collided with each other on lap 2, causing him to hit the guardrail. Gordon finished 23rd, ending his streak of consecutive road course victories.
- Ron Hornaday Jr. drove Terry Labonte's #5 car for this race.

=== Pepsi 400 presented by Meijer ===
The Pepsi 400 presented by Meijer was held August 20 at Michigan Speedway. Dale Earnhardt Jr. won the pole.

Top ten results

1. #2 - Rusty Wallace
2. #28 - Ricky Rudd
3. #18 - Bobby Labonte
4. #88 - Dale Jarrett
5. #10 - Johnny Benson
6. #3 - Dale Earnhardt
7. #26 - Jimmy Spencer
8. #17 - Matt Kenseth
9. #22 - Ward Burton
10. #99 - Jeff Burton

Failed to qualify: Geoff Bodine (#60), Darrell Waltrip (#66), Stacy Compton (#9), Kyle Petty (#44), David Keith (#95), Carl Long (#85)

- Kerry Earnhardt make his NASCAR Winston Cup Series debut in this race, driving the #71 Chevy for Dave Marcis. The presence of Dale Earnhardt, Dale Earnhardt Jr., and Kerry made this the only time in NASCAR's modern era, and only the second time in NASCAR's history altogether that a father would race against two of his sons. Lee Petty had previously accomplished that feat with sons Richard and Maurice back in 1960. While Dale Sr. would finish a strong sixth position, both of his sons had troubles during the race. Dale Jr. blew an engine en route to a 31st-place finish, while Kerry fell victim to an early accident and finished last.

=== goracing.com 500 presented by SkyTel ===
The goracing.com 500 presented by SkyTel was held August 26 at Bristol Motor Speedway. Rusty Wallace won the pole.

Top ten results

1. #2 - Rusty Wallace
2. #20 - Tony Stewart
3. #6 - Mark Martin
4. #3 - Dale Earnhardt
5. #1 - Steve Park
6. #99 - Jeff Burton
7. #21 - Elliott Sadler
8. #40 - Sterling Marlin
9. #88 - Dale Jarrett
10. #28 - Ricky Rudd

Failed to qualify: Mike Bliss (#27), Hut Stricklin (#90), Carl Long (#85), Ricky Craven (#50)

=== Pepsi Southern 500 presented by Kmart ===
The Pepsi Southern 500 presented by Kmart was held September 3 at Darlington Raceway. Jeremy Mayfield won the pole.

Top ten results

1. #18 - Bobby Labonte*
2. #99 - Jeff Burton
3. #3 - Dale Earnhardt
4. #24 - Jeff Gordon
5. #88 - Dale Jarrett
6. #22 - Ward Burton
7. #16 - Kevin Lepage
8. #28 - Ricky Rudd
9. #20 - Tony Stewart
10. #1 - Steve Park

Failed to qualify: Stacy Compton (#9)

- The race was shortened to 328 laps due to thunderstorms. Due to the rain delay, race coverage was moved from ESPN to ESPN2 but retained ESPN's announcer team and graphics.
- Bobby Labonte won the race from the 37th starting position. the worst starting spot to victory since Jeff Gordon at Talladega when he started 36th.
- Darrell Waltrip made his 800th career Cup Series start in this race, becoming the 3rd driver to accomplish this feat.

=== Chevrolet Monte Carlo 400 ===
The Chevrolet Monte Carlo 400 was held September 9 at Richmond International Raceway. Jeff Burton won the pole.

Top ten results

1. #24 - Jeff Gordon*
2. #3 - Dale Earnhardt
3. #6 - Mark Martin
4. #1 - Steve Park
5. #99 - Jeff Burton
6. #20 - Tony Stewart
7. #10 - Johnny Benson
8. #22 - Ward Burton
9. #28 - Ricky Rudd
10. #25 - Jerry Nadeau

Failed to qualify: Mike Bliss (#27), Robby Gordon (#13), Darrell Waltrip (#66), Dave Marcis (#71)

- Gordon's victory denied Earnhardt a million-dollar bonus as being eligible for the No Bull 5 program in this event.
- Casey Atwood, along with Ray Evernham's new team Evernham Motorsports, made their NASCAR Winston Cup Series debut in the #19 Ford (the team switched to Dodge in 2001 due to the team being a huge part of Dodge's return into NASCAR). Atwood finished his debut in 19th place, two laps down.
- This would be the final time that Darrell Waltrip failed to qualify for a Winston Cup race.

=== Dura Lube 300 sponsored by Kmart ===
The Dura Lube 300 sponsored by Kmart was held September 17 at New Hampshire International Speedway. Bobby Labonte won the pole.

Top ten results

1. #99 - Jeff Burton*
2. #18 - Bobby Labonte
3. #28 - Ricky Rudd
4. #88 - Dale Jarrett
5. #2 - Rusty Wallace
6. #24 - Jeff Gordon
7. #43 - John Andretti
8. #6 - Mark Martin
9. #33 - Joe Nemechek
10. #36 - Ken Schrader

Failed to qualify: Steve Grissom (#44), Dave Marcis (#71)

- This race is the only non-superspeedway Cup race to run restrictor plates race since the adoption of the current 358 cubic inch formula. After the deaths of Adam Petty in May and Kenny Irwin Jr. in July, NASCAR decided to run restrictor plates as both accidents were caused by stuck throttles. Adding restrictor plates did have the desired result of slowing down the cars drastically, but also restricted passing so much that Jeff Burton led all 300 laps. This lack of passing was so uncompetitive that restrictor plates were gone for the very next Cup race. Replacing the plates was an engine kill switch, which was located on the steering wheel, and it allowed drivers to halt the car if their throttle was stuck.
- Jeff Burton led all 300 laps. As of 2020, this was the last time that a driver led every single lap in a NASCAR points race. The closest a driver came to accomplishing this feat was in 2016 when Martin Truex Jr. led 392 of 400 laps and won the Coca-Cola 600.

=== MBNA.com 400 ===
The MBNA.com 400 was held September 24 at Dover Downs International Speedway. Jeremy Mayfield won the pole.

Top ten results

1. #20 - Tony Stewart
2. #10 - Johnny Benson
3. #28 - Ricky Rudd
4. #1 - Steve Park
5. #18 - Bobby Labonte
6. #6 - Mark Martin
7. #33 - Joe Nemechek
8. #2 - Rusty Wallace
9. #24 - Jeff Gordon
10. #14 - Rick Mast 1 lap down

Failed to qualify: Hut Stricklin (#90), Joe Bessey (#60)

- Kurt Busch made his Cup Series debut in this race, replacing Chad Little as driver of the #97 Roush Racing Ford. Busch started 10th and finished 18th.
- This was the last race to air on TNN under "The Nashville Network" name.

=== NAPA Autocare 500 ===
The NAPA Autocare 500 was held October 1 at Martinsville Speedway. Tony Stewart won the pole.

Top ten results

1. #20 - Tony Stewart
2. #3 - Dale Earnhardt
3. #99 - Jeff Burton
4. #28 - Ricky Rudd
5. #24 - Jeff Gordon
6. #88 - Dale Jarrett
7. #26 - Jimmy Spencer
8. #31 - Mike Skinner
9. #40 - Sterling Marlin
10. #18 - Bobby Labonte

Failed to qualify: Scott Pruett (#32), Steve Grissom (#44), Carl Long (#85), Dave Marcis (#71), Rich Bickle (#60)

=== UAW-GM Quality 500 ===
The UAW-GM Quality 500 was held October 8 at Lowe's Motor Speedway. Jeff Gordon won the pole.

Top ten results

1. #18 - Bobby Labonte*
2. #12 - Jeremy Mayfield
3. #28 - Ricky Rudd
4. #20 - Tony Stewart
5. #6 - Mark Martin
6. #99 - Jeff Burton
7. #1 - Steve Park
8. #10 - Johnny Benson
9. #17 - Matt Kenseth
10. #22 - Ward Burton

Failed to qualify: Scott Pruett (#32), Ricky Craven (#50), Steve Grissom (#44), Carl Long (#85), Stacy Compton (#9), Dave Marcis (#71)

- This was the final race aired on TBS.
- This was Labonte's fourth and final victory of 2000, giving him a 252-point lead over Jeff Burton.

=== Winston 500 presented by UPS ===
The Winston 500 was held on October 15 at Talladega Superspeedway. Joe Nemechek won the pole. Bill Elliott led the most laps.

Top ten results

1. #3 - Dale Earnhardt
2. #55 - Kenny Wallace
3. #33 - Joe Nemechek
4. #24 - Jeff Gordon
5. #5 - Terry Labonte
6. #31 - Mike Skinner*
7. #6 - Mark Martin
8. #2 - Rusty Wallace
9. #27 - Mike Bliss
10. #17 - Matt Kenseth

Failed to qualify: Wally Dallenbach Jr. (#75), Blaise Alexander (#91), Hut Stricklin (#90)

- This would be Earnhardt's 76th and final career NASCAR Winston Cup Series victory before his death in the 2001 Daytona 500.
- In addition, this would be Earnhardt's 100th overall victory in NASCAR Winston Cup racing, with 76 points wins and 24 non-points races throughout his career.
- This would be the last Cup victory for the RCR #3 until Austin Dillon's victory at the 2017 Coca-Cola 600.
- This race is strongly remembered for Earnhardt's late-race charge from the back to the front. With 5 laps to go, Earnhardt was battling for the 18th position, but in just 3 laps, he went from the 18th spot to battling for the lead with less than 2 laps to go. He actually ended up taking the lead from both his teammate Mike Skinner, and son Dale Earnhardt Jr. in the tri-oval, coming to the white flag.
- This was Dale Earnhardt's first, and only, Winston No Bull 5 Million Dollar Bonus win.
- This was Earnhardt's 10th career Talladega win, the most wins at Talladega by a driver as of 2020.
- This race was the debut of a new aerodynamics package for both Daytona and Talladega restrictor-plate races. This new package was supposed to go into effect starting in the 2001 Daytona 500, but due to the controversy of the 1st 3 plate races earlier in the season, the new rules package took effect immediately in this race. The new package for this race saw a lot of passing and had a total of 49 lead changes among 21 different drivers.
- This was the last Cup race sponsored by a tobacco product.

=== Pop Secret Microwave Popcorn 400 ===
The Pop Secret Microwave Popcorn 400 was held October 22 at North Carolina Speedway. Jeremy Mayfield won the pole.

Top ten results

1. #88 - Dale Jarrett*
2. #24 - Jeff Gordon
3. #28 - Ricky Rudd
4. #99 - Jeff Burton
5. #2 - Rusty Wallace
6. #1 - Steve Park
7. #20 - Tony Stewart
8. #22 - Ward Burton
9. #4 - Bobby Hamilton
10. #33 - Joe Nemechek

Failed to qualify: Ted Musgrave (#01), Rich Bickle (#60), Steve Grissom (#44), Hut Stricklin (#90), Stacy Compton (#9)

- This was Jarrett's first victory since the Daytona 500 back in February.
- This was the first race to air on TNN under "The National Network" name.

=== Checker Auto Parts/Dura Lube 500 ===
The Checker Auto Parts/Dura Lube 500 was held November 5 at Phoenix International Raceway. Rusty Wallace won the pole.

Top ten results

1. #99 - Jeff Burton
2. #12 - Jeremy Mayfield
3. #1 - Steve Park
4. #2 - Rusty Wallace
5. #18 - Bobby Labonte*
6. #6 - Mark Martin
7. #24 - Jeff Gordon
8. #93 - Dave Blaney
9. #3 - Dale Earnhardt
10. #88 - Dale Jarrett

Failed to qualify: Stacy Compton (#9), Steve Grissom (#44), Robby Gordon (#13), Dave Marcis (#71), Hut Stricklin (#90)

- It was the last race televised by The Nashville Network (during the broadcast, known as The National Network), which was later called Spike, and is now called Paramount Network.
- Ryan Newman made his NASCAR Cup Series debut in this race, starting 10th and finishing 41st.
- Bobby Labonte's 5th-place finish gave him a 218-point lead over Dale Earnhardt. Labonte could mathematically win the championship at Homestead if he finishes at least 5th or better.

=== Pennzoil 400 presented by Discount Auto Parts ===
The Pennzoil 400 presented by Discount Auto Parts was held November 12 at Homestead-Miami Speedway. Steve Park won the pole.

Top ten results

1. #20 - Tony Stewart
2. #12 - Jeremy Mayfield
3. #6 - Mark Martin
4. #18 - Bobby Labonte*
5. #26 - Jimmy Spencer
6. #28 - Ricky Rudd
7. #24 - Jeff Gordon 1 lap down
8. #1 - Steve Park 1 lap down
9. #93 - Dave Blaney 2 laps down
10. #19 - Casey Atwood 2 laps down

Failed to qualify: Kyle Petty (#45), Hut Stricklin (#90), Ricky Craven (#50), Dave Marcis (#71), Steve Grissom (#44), Norm Benning (#84), Hermie Sadler (#60), Ted Musgrave (#01)

- Bobby Labonte clinched the 2000 Winston Cup championship by finishing 4th with only one race left. It was the 2nd straight year that the championship was won at Homestead. He led the standings by 256 points over Jeff Burton going into the season finale at Atlanta.
- This was Joe Gibbs' first Winston Cup Championship as an owner since he formed his racing team back in 1992.

=== NAPA 500 ===
The NAPA 500 was scheduled for November 19, but was held on November 20 due to a rain delay at the Atlanta Motor Speedway. Jeff Gordon won the pole.

Top ten results

1. #25 - Jerry Nadeau*
2. #3 - Dale Earnhardt*
3. #22 - Ward Burton
4. #24 - Jeff Gordon
5. #18 - Bobby Labonte*
6. #31 - Mike Skinner
7. #2 - Rusty Wallace
8. #40 - Sterling Marlin
9. #17 - Matt Kenseth 1 lap down
10. #10 - Johnny Benson 1 lap down

Failed to qualify: Stacy Compton (#9), Hermie Sadler* (#60), Hut Stricklin (#90), Dick Trickle (#71), Blaise Alexander (#91), Morgan Shepherd (#80), Tim Sauter (#61), Larry Foyt (#41), Kevin Lepage (#16), Carl Long (#85), Mike Bliss (#27), Steve Grissom (#44), Norm Benning (#84)

- Because of a deal that gave broadcasting rights to Fox, FX, NBC, and TNT, this was ESPN's last Winston Cup race until the station along with ABC was brought back to NASCAR in 2007. It is remembered for Bob Jenkins making a farewell speech and his fellow commentator Benny Parsons and Ned Jarrett almost making him cry as they said goodbye on TV. Jenkins introduced a video from ESPN thanking all the fans, simply stating "Without you, there would have been no magic."
- This was Ned Jarrett's final Winston Cup race as a full-time color commentator.
- This was Nadeau's first and only career Cup Series victory.
- This was the 809th and final career Cup Series start for Darrell Waltrip, who would end his driving career and start his broadcasting career in 2001 for NASCAR on FOX.
- With his 2nd-place finish in this race, Dale Earnhardt would overtake Jeff Burton to finish 2nd in the championship standings, 265 points behind Bobby Labonte.
- This was the last race for Galaxy Motorsports after 22 years since the team was established in 1978 under RahMoc Enterprises, it was rumored that the team would return for 2001 with Pizza Hut as the primary sponsor, but the team would shut down before the season began due to lack of finances.
- Bobby Labonte and runner-Up Dale Earnhardt were the only two drivers to not score a single DNF all season.
- Scott Wimmer made his Cup Series debut in this race, having initially entered the weekend's ARCA race, but DNQ'd when ARCA qualifying being rained out. The team elected to attempt the Cup race, with Wimmer managing to qualify, and actually led 9 laps, including three under green flag conditions. Wimmer would finish three laps down in 22nd position.
- This was the last race attempted by Joe Bessey Racing, as the team would shut down after failing to qualify to this race, it was rumored that Joe Bessey had attempted to field the #60 car for 2001 with Hermie Sadler driving the vehicle with TracFone Wireless and World Championship Wrestling as the sponsors, and it was set to qualify for the 2001 Dura Lube 400 at Rockingham, But Bessey would withdrawal the car from qualifying for this race due to financial and funding problems.

== Drivers' championship ==
(key) Bold - Pole position awarded by time. Italics - Pole position set by owner's points standings. * – Most laps led.

Pos	Driver	DAY	ROC	LVS	ATL	DAR	BRI	TEX	MAR	TAL	CAL	RCH	CLT	DOV	MCH	POC	SON	DAY	NHA	POC	IND	GLN	MCH	BRI	DAR	RCH	NHA	DOV	MAR	CLT	TAL	ROC	PHO	HOM	ATL	Points
1	Bobby Labonte	6	1*	5	2	13	6	3	12	21	2	26	2	3	**3**	13	4	12	9	6	1	**5**	3	15	1	15	**2**	5	10	1	12	20	5	4	5	5130
2	Dale Earnhardt	21	2	8	1	3	39	7	9	3	17	10	3	6	2	4	6	8	6	25	8	25	6	4	3	2	12	17	2	11	1	17	9	20	2	4865
3	Jeff Burton	2	32	1*	43	5	9	2	2	12	5	7	11	34	11	7	16	1	11	2	6	3	10	6	2	**5***	1*	36	3*	6	29	4	1*	11	12	4841
4	Dale Jarrett	**1***	5	7	**36**	2	21	33	5	17	9	3	5	4	4	2	7	**2***	7	4*	7	7	4	9	5	31	4	32	6	40	15	1	10	17	15	4684
5	Ricky Rudd	15	6	**12**	11	17	14	10	22	27	4	4	17	5	12	3	5	5	10	38	**21**	11	2	10	8	9	3	3	4	3*	11	3	37	6	24	4575
6	Tony Stewart	17	4	2	34	4	42	9	6	34	10	8	14	1*	1	6	10	6	1*	**26**	5	6	41	2	9	6	23	1*	**1**	4	27	7	14	1*	38	4570
7	Rusty Wallace	4	**11**	15	32	16	1	4	**10***	41	8	**5***	8	**14**	7	**10***	**26**	3	**15**	1	2*	34	1*	**1***	30	34	5	8	23	21	8	5	**4**	15	7	4544
8	Mark Martin	5	8	3	3	9	16	11	1	6*	14	32	12	36	40	5	3	4	3	43	43	2	11	3	14	3	8	6	18	5	7	40	6	3	40	4410
9	Jeff Gordon	34	10	28	9	**8**	8*	25	4	1	11	14	10	32	14	8	1*	10	5	3	33	23	36	23	4	1	6	9	5	**39**	4	2	7	7	**4**	4361
10	Ward Burton	8	3	23	8	1*	3	14	11	10	6	6	13	8	6	27	21	7	18	28	28	22	9	11	6	8	30	40	43	10	22	8	12	39	3	4152
11	Steve Park	31	9	43	4	39	**7**	19	25	32	16	11	9	19	29	15	17	33	28	15	16	1*	33	5	10	4	34	4	11	7	19	6	3	**8**	21	3934
12	Mike Skinner	16	21	27	30*	14	13	12	19	2	**7**	33	7	9	20	9	20	9	39	7	9	36	16	14	43	30	24	11	8	20	6	14	11	23	6	3898
13	Johnny Benson	12	14	6	DNQ	24	2	42	16	13	23	25	16	15	24	34	18	13	14	12	25	27	5	13	38	7	11	2	19	8	33	11	16	30	10	3716
14	Matt Kenseth **(R)**	10	37	14	40	6	12	31	21	18	3*	15	1	2	17	14	32	20	19	5	26	10	8	39	33	32	17	12	34	9	10	25	42	21	9	3711
15	Joe Nemechek	42	30	9	5	41	25	37	17	22	20	23	23	7	18	42	11	11	2	34	18	8	23	27	31	40	9	7	14	14	**3**	10	24	18	25	3534
16	Dale Earnhardt Jr. **(R)**	13	19	10	29	40	38	1*	26	42	12	1	**4***	10	13	19	24	35	21	13	13	40	**31**	21	11	13	31	16	36	19	14	34	27	13	20	3516
17	Terry Labonte	7	17	31	15	11	5	**8**	23	7	33	2	22	11	26	12	27	41	43	11			20	16	15	25	25	13	17	27	5	38	17	25	17	3433
18	Ken Schrader	9	13	16	23	22	26	18	13	36	24	12	37	23	16	18	15	23	23	19	22	18	19	12	16	17	10	30	16	25	37	18	40	32	26	3398
19	Sterling Marlin	24	15	18	12	21	10	34	24	8	32	29	19	31	10	22	2	25	25	42	30	30	15	8	17	20	22	37	9	31	41	33	15	26	8	3363
20	Jerry Nadeau	35	29	20	42	37	19	43	20	19	13	30	38	42	23	20	8	15	4	27	4	38	12	32	29	10	21	33	12	36	13	27	23	12	1*	3273
21	Bill Elliott	3	25	4	10	19	36	30	8	15	19	9	43	12	8	38	35	38	24	32	3	13	38			12	37	19	15	34	24	16	26	22	11	3267
22	Jimmy Spencer	30	26	30	17	23	18	15	28	5	40	17	25	22	15	36	34	32	41	9	17	31	7	24	32	33	15	34	7	15	38	39	13	5	33	3188
23	John Andretti	22	12	25	18	20	33	32	14	11	25	18	31	13	9	21	43	14	40	41	42	37	27	20	37	11	7	22	13	18	20	23	28	37	19	3169
24	Jeremy Mayfield	11	7	17	28	34	4	6	7	**14**	1	36	6	37	41*	1	33	43	8	10	INQ		13	35	**41***	39	40	**35**	38	2	42	**29***	2	2	41	3156
25	Robert Pressley	20	43	21	33	18	17	26	15	23	21	35	26	26	5	11	37	17	38	14	27	26	32	37	36	37	18	14	33	35	25	12	31	16	13	3055
26	Kenny Wallace	29	24	39	37	35	20	21	42	40	36	20	27	18	31	23	13	19	26	21	29	14	30	26	35	14	43	15	22	37	2	43	19	24	23	2874
27	Michael Waltrip	39	23	33	25	32	11	29	3	31	30	19	18	39	22	43	12	42	35	17	20	17	21	19	40	43	20	24	24	22	34	35	32	34	39	2797
28	Kevin Lepage	36	27	11	38	10	30	5	34	DNQ	22	21	15	21	21	26	41	37	31	23	36	32	18	18	7	22	38	38	29	12	43	36	21	27	DNQ	2795
29	Elliott Sadler	38	28	41	14	12	41	39	29	DNQ	43	24	21	16	27	16	38	18	16	29	34	28	40	7	18	42	13	26	32	16	17	19	30	28	42	2762
30	Bobby Hamilton	43	40	34	13	7	15	16	18	43	18	31	34	27	43	40	14	36	22	39	40	16	14	34	22	38	35	25	35	34	36	9	43	31	16	2715
31	Dave Blaney **(R)**	27	DNQ	22	20	26	35	22	41	30	38	34	40	25	25	30	29	24	34	18	23	35	24	43	20	18	26	39	30	28	28	42	8	9	18	2656
32	Chad Little	23	18	19	6	15	23	13	27	25	15	39	20	20	32	17	25	16	42	20	19	12	22	30	21	29	33				18					2634
33	Rick Mast	28	33	DNQ	21	30	34	20	DNQ	DNQ	39	DNQ	39	43	30	35	DNQ	31	12	8	38	19	29	29	12	28	32	10	26	17	31	13	39	29	35	2366
34	Wally Dallenbach Jr.	40	20	35	39	DNQ	29	DNQ	DNQ	16	27	16	28	24	34	39	40	21	27	31	35	9	25	33	19	23	39	21	40	33	DNQ	22	22	35	29	2344
35	Brett Bodine	DNQ	35	DNQ	16	27	22	23	36	DNQ	41	38	30	28	36	32	30	DNQ	20	30	39	DNQ	42	28	27	35	42	20	41	32	26	26	20	14	28	2145
36	Darrell Waltrip	32	39	38	31	43	31	24	43	26	29	DNQ	36	33	DNQ	DNQ	28	27	33	22	11	20	DNQ	42	42	DNQ	29	31	27	30	35	37	33	36	34	1981
37	Scott Pruett **(R)**	19	DNQ	42	41	DNQ	DNQ	27	32	20	34	27	41	38	19	31	39	40	30	36	10	DNQ	17	38	24	16	41	42	DNQ	DNQ	39	30	34	43	32	1929
38	Stacy Compton **(R)**	26	34	32	35	29	28	36	39	33	28	22	33	30	42	37	31	39	29	35	37	29	DNQ	INQ	DNQ	24	16	29	39	DNQ	23	DNQ	DNQ	38	DNQ	1857
39	Mike Bliss **(R)**	33	DNQ	DNQ	DNQ				35	24	35	41	32	35	37	33	22	28	32	24	31	39	28	DNQ	28	DNQ	19	43	28	43	9	21	38	40	DNQ	1748
40	Ted Musgrave		16	26	27	42	43			35			DNQ					Wth		16	24		26	17	13	21	14	23	21	29	32	DNQ	25	DNQ		1614
41	Kyle Petty	25	31	29	26	25	24	DNQ	38	9	26	28		DNQ	39	41	19	30		40	32	41	DNQ	22					31		QL			DNQ		1441
42	Kenny Irwin Jr.	14	22	24	24	38	40	17	37	4	42	42	24	17	35	25	23	22	Wth																	1440
43	Robby Gordon	18	38	13	DNQ	28	32	DNQ	40	37	31	37	QL		28		9	DNQ			DNQ	4	34	31	Wth	DNQ	Wth			38		41	DNQ		27	1309
44	Ricky Craven	DNQ	DNQ	40		DNQ	DNQ		31	29		40	42		DNQ			29	17		41		37	DNQ		26	36		20	DNQ	30	15	18	DNQ	30	1175
45	Geoff Bodine	DNQ										13	29	40	38	24	DNQ	34	13	DNQ	12	24	DNQ	25	39	41								41	43	1039
46	Dave Marcis	DNQ	41	DNQ	DNQ	33	DNQ	DNQ	DNQ	38	DNQ	DNQ	DNQ	29	DNQ	29		DNQ	DNQ	37	DNQ			31	23	DNQ	DNQ	28	DNQ	DNQ	40	31	DNQ	DNQ		723
47	Ed Berrier **(R)**	37	36	DNQ	DNQ	DNQ	DNQ	35	DNQ	28	DNQ	DNQ	DNQ	41	33	28		26	37	33																628
48	Kurt Busch																											18	37	13		24	29	19	36	613
49	Todd Bodine				7			DNQ				43									15	42		QL											14	456
50	Hut Stricklin																				14		39	DNQ	34	36	28	DNQ	42	42	DNQ	DNQ	DNQ	DNQ	DNQ	436
51	Dick Trickle					31	27	28		39	37																			23					DNQ	423
52	Steve Grissom												DNQ						36		DNQ				26	27	DNQ	27	DNQ	DNQ	16	DNQ	DNQ	DNQ	DNQ	419
53	Jeff Fuller **(R)**	DNQ	42	36	22	36	37	38																						41						390
54	Casey Atwood																									19			25	Wth				10		328
55	Andy Houston																						35							26		28	36	42		314
56	Rich Bickle								30												DNQ								DNQ		21	DNQ	35			231
57	Derrike Cope	41		37	19	DNQ																														198
58	P. J. Jones												35									21														158
59	David Green	Wth																						36	25											143
60	Bobby Hamilton Jr.																																	33	31	134
61	Ron Hornaday Jr.																					15														118
62	Carl Long	DNQ											QL	DNQ						DNQ	Wth		DNQ	DNQ				41	DNQ	DNQ		32			DNQ	107
63	Gary Bradberry							41	33	DNQ																										104
64	Joe Bessey																										27	DNQ								82
65	Tom Hubert																					33														64
66	Brian Simo																36					DNQ														55
67	Buckshot Jones																																		37	52
68	Bobby Hillin Jr.																							40												43
69	Adam Petty							40																												43
70	Ryan Newman																																41			40
71	Boris Said																42	Wth				DNQ														37
72	Kerry Earnhardt																						43													34
73	Ron Fellows																					43														34
74	Scott Wimmer																																		22	0
	David Keith																				DNQ		DNQ													
	Dwayne Leik										DNQ					DNQ																				
	Blaise Alexander																														DNQ				DNQ	
	Hermie Sadler																																	DNQ	DNQ	
	R. K. Smith																DNQ					DNQ														
	Bill Baird															DNQ					DNQ															
	Andy Hillenburg	DNQ																																		
	Norm Benning	DNQ																																DNQ	DNQ	
	Austin Cameron			DNQ																																
	Morgan Shepherd																				Wth													Wth	DNQ	
	Greg Sacks	DNQ																																		
	Larry Gunselman																													DNQ						
	Tim Sauter																																		DNQ	
	Bobby Gerhart	DNQ																																		
	Larry Foyt																																		DNQ	
	Stanton Barrett	DNQ																																		
	Dan Pardus	DNQ																																		
	Jim Sauter	DNQ																																		
Pos	Driver	DAY	CAR	LVS	ATL	DAR	BRI	TEX	MAR	TAL	CAL	RCH	CLT	DOV	MCH	POC	SON	DAY	NHA	POC	IND	GLN	MCH	BRI	DAR	RCH	NHA	DOV	MAR	CLT	TAL	CAR	PHO	HOM	ATL	Points

== Rookie of the Year ==
In the preseason, the two favorites for the award were Matt Kenseth and Dale Earnhardt Jr. While Earnhardt had the name, the popularity, and the two wins, Kenseth had more consistency and was able to claim the title by a narrow margin. The third-place finisher was Dave Blaney, who had finished 31st in points. Scott Pruett and Stacy Compton showed promise in the beginning of the year, but eventually lost momentum and bottomed out at the end of the year. Mike Bliss started the year with A. J. Foyt Racing, was released after 4 races, then finished the season with Eel River Racing. Ed Berrier and Jeff Fuller finished towards the bottom, mainly due to being released from their rides during the season.

== See also ==
- 2000 NASCAR Busch Series
- 2000 NASCAR Craftsman Truck Series
- 2000 ARCA Bondo/Mar-Hyde Series
- 2000 NASCAR Goody's Dash Series
