= Jimmy Makar =

American stock car racing crew chief and Joe Gibbs Racing employee

- Born: March 24, 1956 (age 70); Morristown, New Jersey, U.S.
- Occupation: Senior Vice President of Racing Operations
- Years active: 1976–2022
- Employer: Joe Gibbs Racing
- Known for: Crew chief for: Rusty Wallace (1990–1991); Dale Jarrett (1992–1994); Bobby Labonte (1995–2003)
- Notable work: 1993 Daytona 500 winning crew chief 2000 NASCAR Winston Cup Series champion crew chief
- Spouse: Patti Makar
- Children: Alex and Dillon Makar

Jimmy Makar (born March 24, 1956) was the Senior Vice President of Racing Operations at Joe Gibbs Racing. Born in Morristown, New Jersey, he was previously a crew chief for Rusty Wallace, Dale Jarrett and Bobby Labonte.

== Career ==
In 1976, at the age of 20, Makar began his NASCAR career after being chosen to take his father's NASCAR Winston Cup Series car to Robert Gee, where he helped with the repairs. After two weeks, he was offered a job at Gee's shop. Makar accepted the job, and moved from New Jersey to North Carolina. He continued to work at Gee's shop until he was offered a job as a mechanic from Harry Hyde in 1979. Two years later, he was hired by Ron Benfield and Buddy Parrott. Makar spent three years with Benfield and Parrott before he was hired by Junior Johnson. However, after one season, he moved to Blue Max Racing, where he continued to work to 1990. During Rusty Wallace's 1989 championship, Makar was the team's chassis specialist. In 1990, he became a crew chief for the first time. He was the crew chief for Wallace in seven races.

During the 1991 season, Makar joined Penske Racing South, where he continued being Wallace's crew chief for 17 races. The combination recorded their first win at Bristol Motor Speedway in the spring. Midway through the season, Makar left Penske to work for Joe Gibbs, who was building a new team around Dale Jarrett, Makar's brother in law. He was Jarrett's crew chief from 1992 to 1994, winning two races together, one of which was Joe Gibbs Racing's first win, the 1993 Daytona 500. After Jarrett left following the 1994 season, Makar remained at Joe Gibbs Racing to become Bobby Labonte's crew chief. With Labonte, he won 19 races, 143 top-tens and 20 pole positions, as well as the 2000 championship. In 2002, Makar was assigned to the position of the team's Senior Vice President of Racing Operations, until his retirement at the end of the 2022 racing season. He also assists the team's engineering and aerodynamic departments. Throughout Makar's crew chief career, he won 22 races with three different drivers.

== Private life ==
He is married to Patti (Jarrett) Makar, and has two children, Alex and Dillon. Jimmy is the brother in law of Dale Jarrett. His family resides in Statesville, North Carolina.
