= Norm Benning =

American racing driver (born 1952)

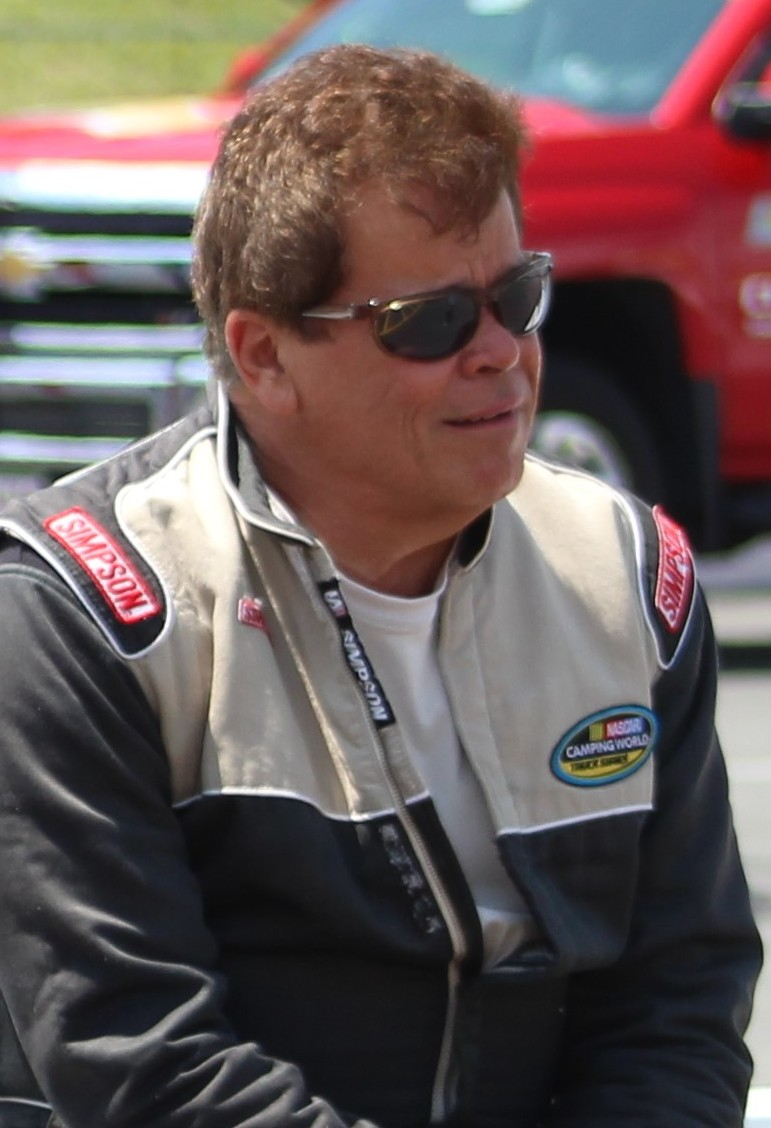
- Benning at Pocono Raceway in 2018
- Born: January 16, 1952 (age 74); Level Green, Pennsylvania, U.S.

NASCAR Cup Series career
- 4 races run over 2 years
- 2010 position: 85th
- Best finish: 53rd (1989)
- First race: 1989 Budweiser 500 (Dover)
- Last race: 1993 TranSouth 500 (Darlington)
Wins	Top tens	Poles
0	0	0

NASCAR O'Reilly Auto Parts Series career
- 3 races run over 2 years
- 2004 position: 141st
- Best finish: 121st (2003)
- First race: 2003 Goulds Pumps/ITT Industries 200 (Nazareth)
- Last race: 2004 Goulds Pumps/ITT Industries 200 (Nazareth)
Wins	Top tens	Poles
0	0	0

NASCAR FedEx Freight Truck Series career
- 260 races run over 18 years
- Truck no., team: No. 6 (Norm Benning Racing)
- 2026 position: 123rd
- Best finish: 17th (2014)
- First race: 2002 Federated Auto Parts 200 (Nashville)
- Last race: 2025 Slim Jim 200 (Martinsville)
Wins	Top tens	Poles
0	0	0

ARCA Menards Series career
- 281 races run over 15 years
- Best finish: 5th (2001)
- First race: 1995 Hoosier General Tire 500k (Atlanta)
- Last race: 2009 Rockingham ARCA 200 (Rockingham)
Wins	Top tens	Poles
0	32	0
- Statistics up to date as of November 6, 2026.

Norm Benning Jr. (born January 16, 1952) is an American professional stock car racing driver and team owner as well as a commercial pilot. He competes part-time in the NASCAR Truck Series, driving the No. 6 Chevrolet Silverado RST for his own team, Norm Benning Racing. He has competed in the series since 2002, primarily driving for his team.

Benning has often been referred to as Stormin' Norman after his performance in the 2013 Mudsummer Classic, the Truck Series' first race on dirt. He previously competed in the NASCAR Busch Series and Winston Cup Series. Benning is the oldest driver to ever finish on the lead lap in NASCAR's top three series.

== Early career ==
Born in Level Green, Pennsylvania, Benning began by racing as a fifteen-year-old at Heidelberg Raceway even though he was supposed to be at least eighteen years old. He also has raced in dirt late models and asphalt modifieds.

== ARCA ==
Benning has finished in the top ten in ARCA points seven times, with a highest place of fifth in 2001. In 276 starts, Benning has five top-fives and 32 top-ten finishes. His best effort was a third-place finish at the Springfield dirt mile in 2004.

== NASCAR ==
=== 1989–2012 ===
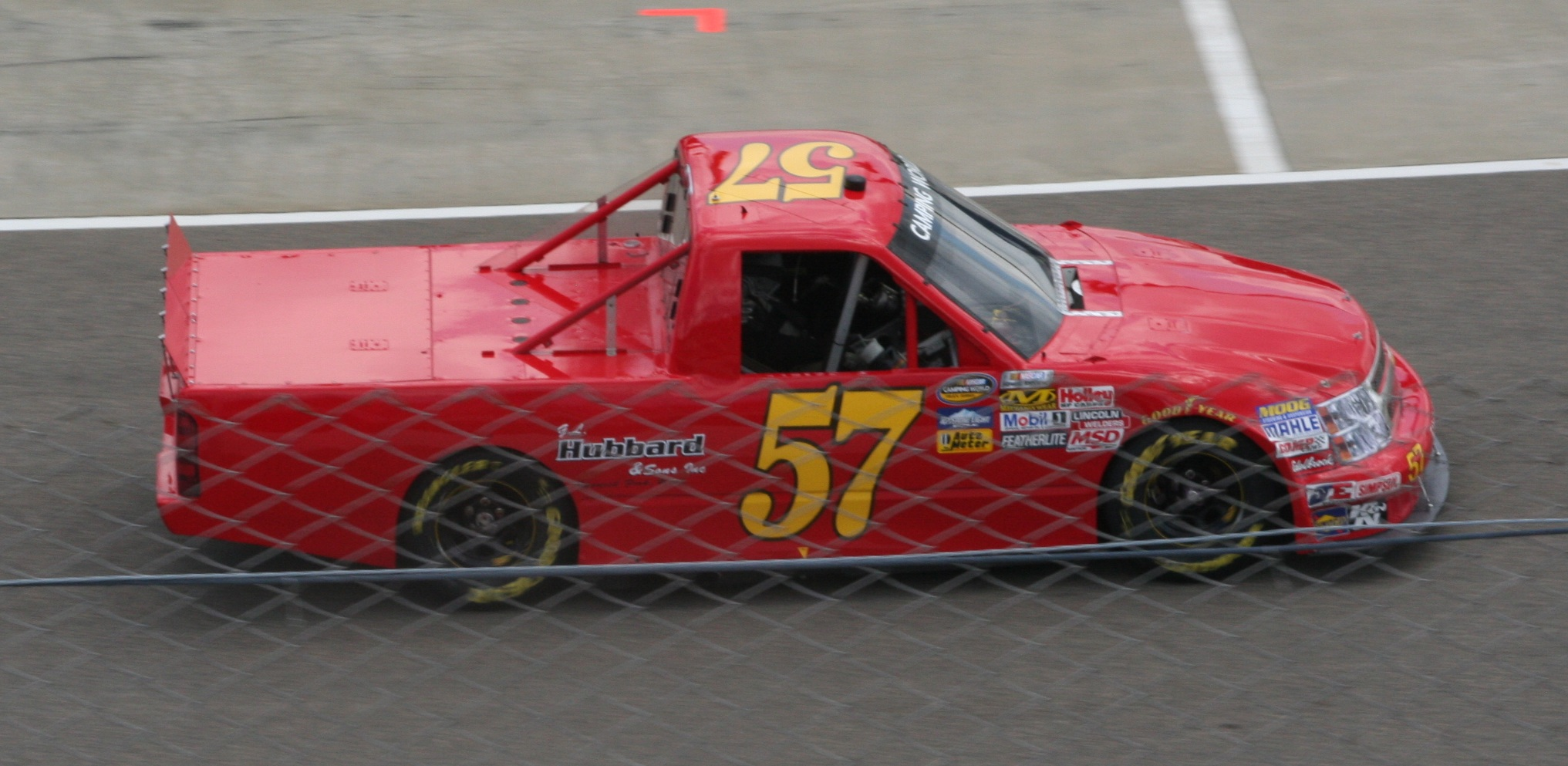
Benning at Rockingham in 2012

Benning has attempted numerous NASCAR races in the top three divisions during his career. Benning made his NASCAR debut in 1989, driving in three races in the Cup Series for the No. 99 car owned by Jerry O'Neil. After starting 35th, Benning would finish 30th in his debut at Dover. He would then match that finish at Pocono and 31st in his return to Dover.

Benning made his last Cup points race start for O'Neil in 1993, starting last (39th) at Darlington and finishing 39th after one lap of competition. After that, Benning attempted to make the Daytona 500 for seven consecutive years, but either failed to qualify or was denied entry due to his car being slow in practice. He attempted many Cup races through 2001 in his own No. 84 84 Lumber Chevy, as well as a couple of entries of the No. 79 T.R.I.X. Racing car. Benning attempted a total of 33 Cup races, but DNQ'd 29 times. He withdrew from the 2011 Daytona 500.

Benning's next NASCAR start came in the Craftsman Truck Series in 2002. Driving for Troxell Racing, Benning qualified the No. 93 Chevy into the field at Nashville Superspeedway in eighteenth position. A vibration dropped the team out of the event, and Benning finished 32nd. In 2009, Benning was back in the Truck Series attempting a full season. He only missed one race, and that was Daytona. At Michigan, Benning finished seventeenth his best finish of the year for the Camping World Truck Series. His final position in points was 21st.

Benning attempted the NASCAR Busch Series for the next two years. Benning was able to compete in three of the six races attempted. In his debut, Benning started the 2003 Nazareth race in 42nd and finished in 40th. He was later able to improve during the season with a career-best 36th place at NHIS. Driving once again at Nazareth, Benning started 42nd before brake failure forced him out of the race, finishing 38th. He fielded a car for Dion Ciccarelli at Nazareth in 2004, and he finished 29th.

During the 2008 Truck Series season, Benning competed in seven of the eight races attempted, driving his own No. 57 Chevrolet. In 2009, Benning competed full-time in the Truck Series for his team (his first attempt at a full NASCAR season). He qualified for 24 of 25 races and finished 21st in overall points. His best finish came at Michigan when he finished seventeenth with Germane Red sponsorship.

=== 2013–2015 ===
In 2013, Benning held onto fifth place after a hard-fought battle with Clay Greenfield in the "Last Chance" qualifying race at Eldora Speedway to earn the final transfer spot into the inaugural Mudsummer Classic. His truck sustained a fair amount of damage, but he was able to make repairs with the help of members of larger teams. He would go on to finish 26th, four laps down. Benning's performance in the last chance race was popular with fans; afterward, he placed the Eldora truck for sale on eBay. Later that season, Benning obtained his career-best Truck Series finish of twelfth at Talladega Superspeedway.

During the 2014 season, Benning changed from his iconic 57 to the number 6, with the 57 being the part-time second entry. Late in the season, Benning gained backing on behalf of Pennsylvania governor Tom Corbett.

In 2015, Benning finished fourteenth in the opening race at Daytona and was tenth in points. Benning scored his best career start of thirteenth during the 2015 Mudsummer Classic and finished nineteenth after rebounding from a late-race spin. The end of the 2015 season was a struggle, as Benning missed four races late in the season.

=== 2016–2018 ===
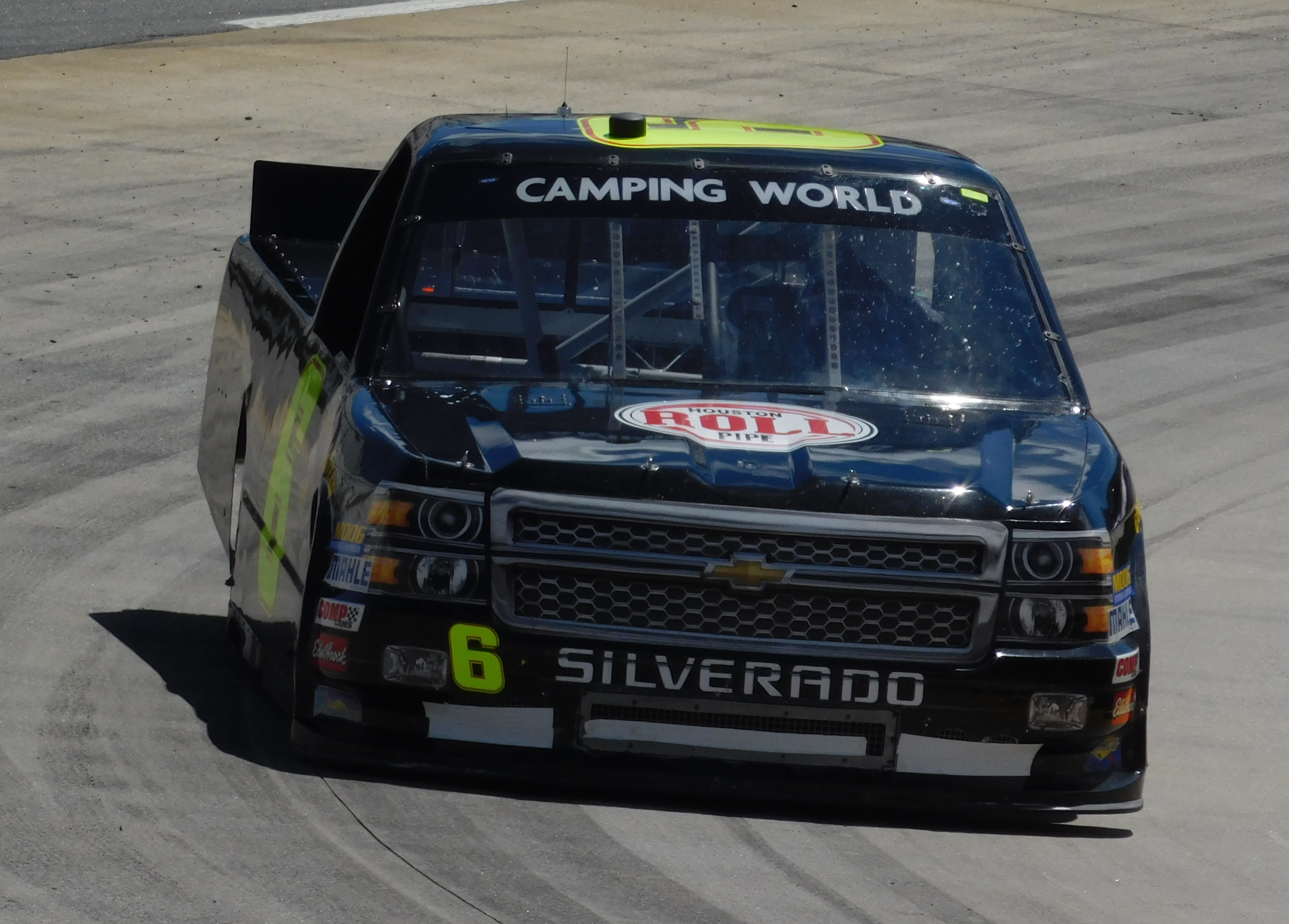
Benning at Martinsville in 2017

2016 started with a DNQ at Daytona, followed by another DNQ at Atlanta. This was the worst start for Benning since 2012. Benning failed to qualify for six races in 2016; in addition to withdrawing from the Charlotte race. Benning missed the race in Texas by .016 seconds after getting knocked out by Austin Hill. After missing all the races in 2016, Benning partnered with MB Motorsports at Kentucky, where he was able to make the race. He started 30th and finished 28th. Benning later partnered with MB for several remaining races. 2016 was a struggle for Benning and his team, as he only managed to qualify for eight races while failing to qualify for eight others, and withdrawing from five.

2017 began the same for Benning, missing the first three races of the season. Benning would make the 4th race of the season in Kansas after only 32 trucks showed up for the 32-truck field. However, after that race, he made every single race he attempted for the rest of the season.

In 2018, Benning made every race until the regular-season finale at Bristol. After Canada, he failed to make Las Vegas through Martinsville and didn't show up for the rest of the season.

=== 2019–2020 ===
2019 showed some promise at the beginning of the season, with sponsorship from Zomongo and H&H Transport returning. During drafting practice, Benning's No. 6 Silverado sat 6th fastest, showing the ability to stay in the pack. However, the team lacked single-truck speed and ultimately missed the field. Atlanta through Dover was hit and miss. An early spin forced Benning to park early despite plans to run the full race, resulting in a 29th-place finish. Benning finished under power in 28th at Las Vegas and then would miss Martinsville and Texas. Benning would qualify at Dover and Kansas but would be parked due to not being able to meet the minimum speed, finishing last at Dover after only 28 laps, and 21st at Kansas after 109 laps. Benning would skip Charlotte due to a large entry list. Over the next four weeks, things would begin to fall into place for Benning and his small team. The second Texas race would result in a seventeenth-place finish, followed by a 24th and 25th at Iowa and Gateway, respectively. The remainder of the season would have ups and downs, including an 18th-place finish at Talladega, followed by an accident at Martinsville, which would ultimately end his season early.

2020 would begin the same as 2019, with Benning missing the cut at Daytona. Benning chose not to make the trip to Las Vegas and had no clear plans for the season. Following the two-month racing hiatus, Benning looked to take advantage of NASCAR's field expansion, from 32 trucks to forty. However, Benning found himself excluded from the races at Charlotte and Atlanta when 47 trucks entered each time. In the following race at Homestead, only 39 teams entered, allowing Benning to make his first start of the season. He made all other attempted races, skipping the other Las Vegas race and the finale at Phoenix Raceway. Benning posted a best finish of 22nd at Talladega Superspeedway, and a points finish of 36th.

=== 2021–2022 ===
Benning would announce plans to attempt the full 2021 NASCAR Camping World Truck Series schedule. Shortly after, Benning would start a fundraising campaign called "Racing With The Ultimate Underdog". Benning would pick up sponsorship from MDF A Sign Company heading into Daytona, and, after several years of running a plain paint scheme, Benning would add red and yellow accent to his truck. Benning would just miss out on qualifying for the season-opening race, but by finishing in the top forty in points in 2020, Benning would make the second race at the Daytona Road Course, thanks to NASCAR's no qualifying for the majority of the 2021 season. Benning would take advantage of Camping World CEO Marcus Lemonis' offer of $15,000 to any team that ran in Las Vegas and Atlanta with Camping World and Overton's paint schemes. After a lackluster season, Benning was able to score a top-twenty finish at Knoxville despite being involved in a late accident. At Gateway, Benning was notified by officials that his truck's nose was no longer legal, forcing him to withdraw. Benning would show at the second Darlington race with a new nose. Benning would score another top-twenty, a seventeenth, at Talladega, with new sponsorship from Cross-Eyed Owl Brewing. For the season finale race, Benning was able to get a Niece Motorsports prepared truck, along with an Ilmor engine. However, problems before qualifying plagued the 6 team, and Benning turned the slowest lap, resulting in a DNQ. Benning did say he and his team would be back in 2022.

Prior to the start of the 2022 season, NASCAR introduced an updated body style for the Truck Series, starting at Daytona. The 2019–2021 bodies would still be legal at all tracks except Daytona and Talladega. Benning, unable to afford the new body, would skip the season opener at Daytona, the first time he had done so since 2008. Benning and the team would not appear until the second annual Bristol Dirt Race, bringing sponsorship Circle B Diecasts aboard. Benning would fall short in his heat race, leaving him as one of the two DNQs. Despite the setback, Circle B agreed to return to the team for Knoxville, which again, Benning missed. Driver and team's next attempt would come at Pocono Raceway, but rain washed out qualifying, again leaving the No. 6 on the outside looking in. Missing Pocono would also break the three-way tie between Benning, Matt Crafton, and Johnny Sauter for most starts at Pocono. Benning would make one last attempt at Richmond, again falling short of qualifying.

=== 2023–present ===
On February 14, 2023, it was revealed that Benning would attempt to qualify for the race at Daytona, driving the No. 46 Toyota for G2G Racing, replacing Johnny Sauter, who was originally on the entry list for the event.

Benning's next attempt would be the 2023 Weatherguard Truck Race on Dirt at Bristol Motor Speedway, on April 8. After rain washed out practice on Friday, race lineup would be decided by the ten-lap qualifying races on Saturday. With no practice time to tune and adjust the truck, Norm ran near the tail of the field for the first nine laps of his qualifier. On lap ten, he was able to take advantage of issues for Tyler Carpenter and Andrew Gordon, finishing 8th and earning the last transfer spot into the main event. This would be Benning's first start since 2021, and his first race with new crew chief Dan Killius, and spotter Rob Tate Jr. Starting thirteth, Benning ran the first two stages towards the rear of the field. After changing four tires in the final break, Norm was able to pass several trucks and complete the race in 24th position, becoming the oldest driver in NASCAR history to finish on the lead lap at 71 years of age. Benning, continuing 2023 on a part-time basis, would skip several races before entering the Tyson 250 at North Wilkesboro Speedway. Practice for Saturday's race would take place on Friday. After only two laps of practice, Norm lost control of the truck heading into turn 3 and backed into the wall, heavily damaging the vehicle. TV coverage provided by Fox Sports showed as the all-volunteer crew of Norm Benning Racing immediately set to work to repair the truck in time for qualifying the following morning. The truck was repaired in time for Saturday morning technical inspection, and Benning was able to make a lap in qualifying, but fell short of making the field for his second DNQ of 2023. The team would skip the next race at Charlotte, entering the Toyota 200 at World Wide Technologies Raceway. Benning qualified 30th and finished 28th.

In 2024, Benning would attempt to qualify for his first race of the season at Milwaukee, but would fail to do so. Benning would later attempt his second race of 2024 in the Love's RV Stop 225 at Talladega, where he later qualified 31st of 38 teams, securing him into his first race in over a year. Benning ran in the lead pack for the entire first stage and the beginning of the second stage, until he was spun on pit road and consequently lapped. However, he was able to get the lap back and rebounded to finish 21st, his highest finish since this same race in 2021. Later in the year, Benning entered the Zip Buy Now, Pay Later 200 at Martinsville, the penultimate race of the season. Benning would later lock into the race due to Josh Reaume withdrawing his No. 27 entry, shrinking the field to the maximum 36 trucks. Benning did not make a lap in practice and qualified 34th. He would go on to fall out after seventeen laps of competition because of a brake failure. He finished 36th.

In 2025, Benning announced plans for a part-time schedule that included Daytona, both Martinsville races, and Talladega. After practice was rained out at Daytona, Benning qualified 22nd, meaning he would race in the season opener for the first time in nearly seven years. He finished sixteenth and became the oldest driver to finish on the lead lap at 73. Benning's next two attempts, at Martinsville and Bristol, both resulted in DNFs and 34th-place finishes.

== Motorsports career results ==
=== Stock car career summary ===
Season	Series	Team	Races	Wins	Top 5	Top 10	Points	Position
1989	ARCA Permatex SuperCar Series	O'Neil Racing	0	0	0	0	0	N/A
1989	NASCAR Winston Cup Series	O'Neil Racing	3	0	0	0	216	53rd
1990	NASCAR Winston Cup Series	James Hylton Motorsports	0	0	0	0	0	N/A
1991	NASCAR Winston Cup Series	O'Neil Racing	0	0	0	0	0	N/A
1993	NASCAR Winston Cup Series	O'Neil Racing	1	0	0	0	46	87th
1993	NASCAR Winston Cup Series	Norm Benning Racing	0	0	0	0	46	87th
1994	NASCAR Winston Cup Series	Norm Benning Racing	0	0	0	0	0	N/A
1995	ARCA Bondo/Mar-Hyde Series	Norm Benning Racing	1	0	0	0	0	104th
1995	NASCAR Winston Cup Series	Norm Benning Racing	0	0	0	0	0	N/A
1996	ARCA Bondo/Mar-Hyde Series	Norm Benning Racing	11	0	0	2	N/A	18th
1996	NASCAR Winston Cup Series	T.R.I.X. Racing	0	0	0	0	0	N/A
1997	ARCA Bondo/Mar-Hyde Series	Norm Benning Racing	21	0	0	0	385	8th
1997	NASCAR Winston Cup Series	Norm Benning Racing	0	0	0	0	0	N/A
1998	ARCA Bondo/Mar-Hyde Series	Norm Benning Racing	22	0	0	2	4035	8th
1998	NASCAR Winston Cup Series	T.R.I.X. Racing	0	0	0	0	0	N/A
1999	ARCA Bondo/Mar-Hyde Series	Norm Benning Racing	21	0	0	2	4135	10th
1999	NASCAR Winston Cup Series	T.R.I.X. Racing	0	0	0	0	0	N/A
2000	ARCA Bondo/Mar-Hyde Series	Norm Benning Racing	20	0	0	6	3950	9th
2000	NASCAR Winston Cup Series	Norm Benning Racing	0	0	0	0	0	N/A
2001	ARCA Re/Max Series	Norm Benning Racing	25	0	0	2	4750	5th
2001	NASCAR Winston Cup Series	Norm Benning Racing	0	0	0	0	0	N/A
2002	ARCA Re/Max Series	Norm Benning Racing	22	0	0	3	4230	10th
2002	NASCAR Craftsman Truck Series	Troxell Racing	1	0	0	0	67	98th
2002	NASCAR Busch Series	Norm Benning Racing	0	0	0	0	0	N/A
2002	NASCAR Winston Cup Series	Norm Benning Racing	0	0	0	0	0	N/A
2003	ARCA Re/Max Series	Norm Benning Racing	22	0	2	5	4015	13th
2003	NASCAR Busch Series	Norm Benning Racing	2	0	0	0	98	121st
2003	NASCAR Winston Cup Series	Norm Benning Racing	0	0	0	0	0	N/A
2004	ARCA Re/Max Series	Norm Benning Racing	22	0	3	6	4445	10th
2004	NASCAR Busch Series	Norm Benning Racing	1	0	0	0	49	141st
2005	ARCA Re/Max Series	Norm Benning Racing	23	0	0	1	4050	11th
2006	ARCA Re/Max Series	Norm Benning Racing	23	0	0	1	4150	11th
2006	NASCAR Craftsman Truck Series	Lafferty Motorsports	0	0	0	0	0	N/A
2007	ARCA Re/Max Series	Norm Benning Racing	23	0	0	0	3940	12th
2008	ARCA Re/Max Series	Norm Benning Racing	20	0	0	1	3260	19th
2008	NASCAR Craftsman Truck Series	Norm Benning Racing	7	0	0	0	469	46th
2008	NASCAR Craftsman Truck Series	SS-Green Light Racing	1	0	0	0	469	46th
2008	NASCAR Sprint Cup Series	Norm Benning Racing	0	0	0	0	0	N/A
2009	ARCA Re/Max Series	Norm Benning Racing	5	0	0	1	770	37th
2009	NASCAR Camping World Truck Series	Norm Benning Racing	24	0	0	0	2097	21st
2009	NASCAR Sprint Cup Series	Norm Benning Racing	0	0	0	0	0	N/A
2010	NASCAR Camping World Truck Series	Norm Benning Racing	25	0	0	0	2188	18th
2010	NASCAR Sprint Cup Series	Norm Benning Racing	0	0	0	0	0	N/A
2011	NASCSR Camping World Truck Series	Norm Benning Racing	19	0	0	0	323	22nd
2011	NASCAR Sprint Cup Series	Norm Benning Racing	0	0	0	0	0	N/A
2012	NASCAR Camping World Truck Series	Norm Benning Racing	17	0	0	0	346	21st
2013	NASCAR Camping World Truck Series	Norm Benning Racing	21	0	0	0	370	20th
2014	NASCAR Camping World Truck Series	Norm Benning Racing	22	0	0	0	432	17th
2015	NASCAR Camping World Truck Series	Norm Benning Racing	19	0	0	0	365	20th
2016	NASCAR Camping World Truck Series	Norm Benning Racing	8	0	0	0	51	37th
2017	NASCAR Camping World Truck Series	Norm Benning Racing	20	0	0	0	279	19th
2018	NASCAR Camping World Truck Series	Norm Benning Racing	16	0	0	0	193	22nd
2019	NASCAR Gander Outdoors Truck Series	Norm Benning Racing	14	0	0	0	171	25th
2020	NASCAR Gander RV & Outdoors Truck Series	Norm Benning Racing	17	0	0	0	128	36th
2021	NASCAR Camping World Truck Series	Norm Benning Racing	13	0	0	0	71	43rd
2022	NASCAR Camping World Truck Series	Norm Benning Racing	0	0	0	0	0	112th
2023	NASCAR Craftsman Truck Series	G2G Racing	0	0	0	0	22	57th
2023	NASCAR Craftsman Truck Series	Norm Benning Racing	2	0	0	0	22	57th
2024	NASCAR Craftsman Truck Series	Norm Benning Racing	2	0	0	0	17	58th
2025	NASCAR Craftsman Truck Series	Norm Benning Racing	12	0	0	0	61	36th
2026	NASCAR Craftsman Truck Series	Norm Benning Racing	0	0	0	0	0	123rd

=== NASCAR ===
(key) (Bold – Pole position awarded by time. Italics – Pole position earned by points standings. * – Most laps led.)

==== Sprint Cup Series ====
NASCAR Sprint Cup Series results
Year	Team	No.	Make	1	2	3	4	5	6	7	8	9	10	11	12	13	14	15	16	17	18	19	20	21	22	23	24	25	26	27	28	29	30	31	32	33	34	35	36	NSCC	Pts	Ref
1989	O'Neil Racing	99	Chevy	DAY	CAR	ATL	RCH	DAR	BRI	NWS	MAR	TAL	CLT	DOV; 30	SON	POC; 30	MCH	DAY	POC; DNQ	TAL; DNQ	GLN	MCH	BRI	DAR	RCH	DOV; 31	MAR	CLT	NWS	CAR	PHO	ATL; DNQ								53rd	216	
1990	Hylton Motorsports	48	Chevy	DAY	RCH	CAR	ATL	DAR; DNQ	BRI	NWS	MAR	TAL	CLT	DOV	SON	POC	MCH	DAY	POC	TAL	GLN	MCH	BRI	DAR	RCH	DOV	MAR	NWS	CLT	CAR	PHO	ATL								N/A	—	
1991	O'Neil Racing	63	Chevy	DAY	RCH	CAR	ATL	DAR	BRI	NWS	MAR	TAL	CLT	DOV	SON	POC	MCH	DAY	POC; DNQ	TAL	GLN	MCH	BRI	DAR	RCH	DOV	MAR	NWS	CLT	CAR	PHO	ATL								N/A	—	
1993	O'Neil Racing	63	Olds	DAY	CAR	RCH	ATL	DAR; 39	BRI	NWS	MAR	TAL	SON	CLT	DOV	POC	MCH	DAY	NHA	POC	TAL	GLN	MCH	BRI	DAR	RCH				CLT; DNQ	CAR; DNQ	PHO	ATL; DNQ							87th	46	
1993	Norm Benning Racing	84	Olds																								DOV; DNQ	MAR	NWS											87th	46	
1994	Norm Benning Racing	84	Olds	DAY	CAR	RCH	ATL	DAR; DNQ	BRI	NWS	MAR	TAL	SON	CLT	DOV; DNQ	POC	MCH	DAY	NHA	POC	TAL	IND; DNQ	GLN	MCH	BRI	DAR	RCH				CLT; DNQ									N/A	—	
1994	Norm Benning Racing	84	Ford																									DOV; DNQ	MAR	NWS		CAR; DNQ	PHO	ATL						N/A	—	
1995	Norm Benning Racing	84	Ford	DAY	CAR	RCH	ATL	DAR	BRI	NWS	MAR	TAL	SON	CLT	DOV	POC	MCH	DAY	NHA	POC	TAL	IND	GLN	MCH	BRI	DAR	RCH	DOV	MAR	NWS	CLT	CAR; DNQ	PHO	ATL						N/A	—	
1996	T.R.I.X. Racing	79	Pontiac	DAY	CAR	RCH	ATL	DAR	BRI	NWS	MAR	TAL	SON	CLT	DOV	POC	MCH	DAY	NHA	POC	TAL	IND	GLN	MCH	BRI	DAR	RCH	DOV	MAR	NWS	CLT	CAR; DNQ	PHO	ATL						N/A	—	
1997	Norm Benning Racing	84	Chevy	DAY; DNQ	CAR	RCH	ATL	DAR	TEX	BRI	MAR	SON	TAL	CLT	DOV	POC	MCH	CAL	DAY	NHA	POC	IND	GLN	MCH	BRI	DAR	RCH	NHA	DOV	MAR	CLT	TAL	CAR	PHO	ATL					N/A	—	
1998	T.R.I.X. Racing	79	Chevy	DAY; DNQ	CAR	LVS	ATL	DAR	BRI	TEX	MAR	TAL	CAL	CLT	DOV	RCH	MCH	POC	SON	NHA	POC	IND	GLN	MCH	BRI	NHA	DAR	RCH	DOV	MAR	CLT	TAL	DAY	PHO	CAR	ATL				N/A	—	
1999	T.R.I.X. Racing	79	Chevy	DAY; DNQ	CAR	LVS	ATL	DAR	TEX	BRI	MAR	TAL	CAL	RCH	CLT	DOV	MCH	POC	SON	DAY	NHA	POC	IND	GLN	MCH	BRI	DAR	RCH	NHA	DOV	MAR	CLT	TAL	CAR	PHO	HOM	ATL			N/A	—	
2000	Norm Benning Racing	84	Chevy	DAY; DNQ	CAR	LVS	ATL	DAR	BRI	TEX	MAR	TAL	CAL	RCH	CLT	DOV	MCH	POC	SON	DAY	NHA	POC	IND	GLN	MCH	BRI	DAR	RCH	NHA	DOV	MAR	CLT	TAL	CAR	PHO	HOM; DNQ	ATL; DNQ			N/A	—	
2001	Norm Benning Racing	84	Chevy	DAY; DNQ	CAR	LVS	ATL	DAR	BRI	TEX	MAR	TAL	CAL	RCH	CLT	DOV	MCH	POC	SON	DAY	CHI	NHA	POC	IND	GLN	MCH	BRI	DAR	RCH	DOV	KAN	CLT	MAR	TAL	PHO	CAR	HOM	ATL	NHA	N/A	—	
2002	Norm Benning Racing	84	Chevy	DAY; DNQ	CAR	LVS	ATL	DAR	BRI	TEX	MAR	TAL	CAL	RCH	CLT	DOV	POC	MCH	SON	DAY	CHI	NHA	POC	IND	GLN	MCH	BRI	DAR	RCH	NHA	DOV	KAN	TAL	CLT	MAR	ATL	CAR	PHO	HOM	N/A	—	
2003	Norm Benning Racing	84	Chevy	DAY; Wth	CAR	LVS	ATL	DAR	BRI	TEX	TAL	MAR	CAL	RCH	CLT	DOV	POC	MCH	SON	DAY	CHI	NHA	POC	IND	GLN	MCH	BRI	DAR	RCH	NHA	DOV	TAL	KAN	CLT	MAR	ATL	PHO	CAR	HOM	N/A	—	
2008	Norm Benning Racing	57	Chevy	DAY; Wth	CAL	LVS	ATL	BRI	MAR	TEX	PHO	TAL	RCH	DAR	CLT	DOV	POC	MCH	SON	NHA	DAY	CHI	IND	POC	GLN	MCH	BRI	CAL	RCH	NHA	DOV	KAN	TAL	CLT	MAR	ATL	TEX	PHO	HOM	84th	0	
2009	Norm Benning Racing	57	Chevy	DAY; DNQ	CAL	LVS	ATL	BRI	MAR	TEX	PHO	TAL	RCH	DAR	CLT	DOV	POC	MCH	SON	NHA	DAY	CHI	IND	POC	GLN	MCH	BRI	ATL	RCH	NHA	DOV	KAN	CAL	CLT	MAR	TAL	TEX	PHO	HOM	84th	0	
2010	Norm Benning Racing	57	Chevy	DAY; DNQ	CAL	LVS	ATL	BRI	MAR	PHO	TEX	TAL	RCH	DAR	DOV	CLT	POC	MCH	SON	NHA	DAY	CHI	IND	POC	GLN	MCH	BRI	ATL	RCH	NHA	DOV	KAN	CAL	CLT	MAR	TAL	TEX	PHO	HOM	85th	0	
2011	Norm Benning Racing	57	Chevy	DAY; Wth	PHO	LVS	BRI	CAL	MAR	TEX	TAL	RCH	DAR	DOV	CLT	KAN	POC	MCH	SON	DAY	KEN	NHA	IND	POC	GLN	MCH	BRI	ATL	RCH	CHI	NHA	DOV	KAN	CLT	TAL	MAR	TEX	PHO	HOM	85th	0	

===== Daytona 500 =====
Year	Team	Manufacturer	Start	Finish
1997	Norm Benning Racing	Chevrolet	DNQ	
1998	T.R.I.X. Racing	Chevrolet	DNQ	
1999	T.R.I.X. Racing	Chevrolet	DNQ	
2000	Norm Benning Racing	Chevrolet	DNQ	
2001	Norm Benning Racing	Chevrolet	DNQ	
2002	Norm Benning Racing	Chevrolet	DNQ	
2003	Norm Benning Racing	Chevrolet	Wth	
2008	Norm Benning Racing	Chevrolet	Wth	
2009	Norm Benning Racing	Chevrolet	DNQ	
2010	Norm Benning Racing	Chevrolet	DNQ	
2011	Norm Benning Racing	Chevrolet	Wth	

==== Busch Series ====
NASCAR Busch Series results
Year	Team	No.	Make	1	2	3	4	5	6	7	8	9	10	11	12	13	14	15	16	17	18	19	20	21	22	23	24	25	26	27	28	29	30	31	32	33	34	NBSC	Pts	Ref
2002	Norm Benning Racing	8	Chevy	DAY	CAR	LVS	DAR	BRI	TEX	NSH	TAL	CAL	RCH	NHA	NZH	CLT	DOV	NSH	KEN	MLW	DAY	CHI	GTW	PPR	IRP	MCH	BRI	DAR	RCH	DOV	KAN	CLT	MEM	ATL	CAR	PHO	HOM; DNQ	N/A	—	
2003	Norm Benning Racing	84	Chevy	DAY	CAR	LVS	DAR	BRI	TEX	TAL	NSH; DNQ	CAL	RCH	GTW									NHA; 36	PPR	IRP; DNQ	MCH												121st	98	
2003	Norm Benning Racing	8	Chevy												NZH; 40	CLT	DOV	NSH	KEN	MLW	DAY	CHI					BRI; DNQ	DAR	RCH	DOV	KAN	CLT	MEM	ATL	PHO			121st	98	
2003	Norm Benning Racing	81	Chevy																																	CAR; DNQ	HOM	121st	98	
2004	Norm Benning Racing	84	Chevy	DAY; DNQ	CAR	LVS	DAR; DNQ	BRI	TEX	NSH; DNQ	TAL	CAL	GTW	RCH																								141st	49	
2004	Norm Benning Racing	81	Chevy												NZH; 38	CLT	DOV	NSH	KEN	MLW	DAY	CHI	NHA	PPR	IRP	MCH	BRI	CAL	RCH	DOV	KAN	CLT	MEM	ATL	PHO	DAR; DNQ	HOM	141st	49	

==== Craftsman Truck Series ====
NASCAR Craftsman Truck Series results
Year	Team	No.	Make	1	2	3	4	5	6	7	8	9	10	11	12	13	14	15	16	17	18	19	20	21	22	23	24	25	NCTC	Pts	Ref
2002	Troxell Racing	93	Chevy	DAY	DAR	MAR	GTW	PPR	DOV	TEX	MEM	MLW	KAN	KEN	NHA	MCH	IRP	NSH; 32	RCH	TEX	SBO	LVS	CAL	PHO	HOM				98th	67	
2006	Lafferty Motorsports	89	Chevy	DAY; DNQ	CAL	ATL	MAR	GTW	CLT	MFD	DOV	TEX	MCH	MLW	KAN	KEN	MEM	IRP	NSH	BRI	NHA	LVS	TAL	MAR	ATL	TEX	PHO	HOM	N/A	—	
2008	Norm Benning Racing	57	Chevy	DAY	CAL	ATL	MAR	KAN	CLT	MFD	DOV	TEX	MCH	MLW	MEM	KEN	IRP	NSH; 34	BRI; DNQ	GTW	NHA; 33	LVS; 30			ATL; 31	TEX; 28	PHO; 34	HOM; 35	46th	469	
2008	SS-Green Light Racing	0	Chevy																				TAL; 32	MAR					46th	469	
2009	Norm Benning Racing	57	Chevy	DAY; DNQ	CAL; 28	ATL; 30	MAR; 25	KAN; 31	CLT; 24	DOV; 30	TEX; 33	MCH; 17	MLW; 24	MEM; 21	KEN; 18	IRP; 23	NSH; 22	BRI; 29	CHI; 24	IOW; 27	GTW; 26	NHA; 23	LVS; 24	MAR; 25	TAL; 18	TEX; 29	PHO; 25	HOM; 29	21st	2097	
2010	Norm Benning Racing	57	Chevy	DAY; 25	ATL; 25	MAR; 23	NSH; 31	KAN; 24	DOV; 23	CLT; 24	TEX; 17	MCH; 28	IOW; 22	GTW; 25	IRP; 22	POC; 28	NSH; 22	DAR; 18	BRI; 25	CHI; 24	KEN; 31	NHA; 26	LVS; 30	MAR; 24	TAL; 30	TEX; 26	PHO; 24	HOM; 32	18th	2188	
2011	Norm Benning Racing	57	Chevy	DAY; 36	PHO; 27	DAR; 26	MAR; 27	NSH; DNQ	DOV; 26	CLT; DNQ	KAN; 33	TEX; 35	KEN; 31	IOW; 26	NSH; 25	IRP; 31	POC; 24	MCH; 20	BRI; DNQ	ATL; DNQ	CHI; 27	NHA; 25	KEN; 21	LVS; 15	TAL; DNQ	MAR; 29	TEX; DNQ	HOM; 29	22nd	323	
2012	Norm Benning Racing	57	Chevy	DAY; DNQ	MAR; DNQ	CAR; 30	KAN; 28	CLT; DNQ	DOV; 25	TEX; 22	KEN; DNQ	IOW; 24	CHI; 25	POC; 20	MCH; 23	BRI; 27	ATL; DNQ	IOW; 25	KEN; 15	LVS; 18	TAL; 15	MAR; 31	TEX; 26	PHO; 19	HOM; 29				21st	346	
2013	Norm Benning Racing	57	Chevy	DAY; 17	MAR; 33	CAR; 33	KAN; 26	CLT; DNQ	DOV; 29	TEX; 23	KEN; 25	IOW; 30	ELD; 26	POC; 28	MCH; 22	BRI; 33	MSP; 20	IOW; 28	CHI; 32	LVS; 26	TAL; 12	MAR; 29	TEX; 30	PHO; 24	HOM; 28				20th	370	
2014	Norm Benning Racing	57	Chevy	DAY; 20	MAR; 28	KAN; 18	CLT; 17	DOV; 28	TEX; 22	GTW; 22	KEN; 26	IOW; 26																	17th	432	
2014	Norm Benning Racing	6	Chevy										ELD; 27	POC; 20	MCH; 22	BRI; 25	MSP; 22	CHI; 27	NHA; 27	LVS; 24	TAL; 20	MAR; 25	TEX; 28	PHO; 28	HOM; 34				17th	432	
2015	Norm Benning Racing	6	Chevy	DAY; 14	ATL; 31	MAR; 28	KAN; 24	CLT; 32	DOV; 26	TEX; 25	GTW; 26	IOW; 25	KEN; 31	ELD; 19	POC; 22	MCH; 27	BRI; 24	MSP; 21	CHI; 22	NHA; DNQ	LVS; 26	TAL; 21	MAR; DNQ	TEX; 27	PHO; DNQ	HOM; DNQ			20th	365	
2016	Norm Benning Racing	6	Chevy	DAY; DNQ	ATL; DNQ	MAR; DNQ	KAN; DNQ	DOV; DNQ	CLT	TEX; DNQ	IOW	GTW		ELD; DNQ					CHI; 31	NHA									37th	51	
2016	Norm Benning Racing	63	Chevy										KEN; 28		POC; 23	BRI	MCH; 27	MSP; 20			LVS; 26	TAL	MAR	TEX; 32	PHO; 26	HOM; DNQ			37th	51	
2017	Norm Benning Racing	6	Chevy	DAY; DNQ	ATL; DNQ	MAR; DNQ	KAN; 24	CLT; 26	DOV; 26	TEX; 17	GTW; 22	IOW; 22	KEN; 32	ELD; 13	POC; 21	MCH; 20	BRI; 31	MSP; 18	CHI; 23	NHA; 19	LVS; 19	TAL; 31	MAR; 27	TEX; 23	PHO; 22	HOM; 25			19th	279	
2018	Norm Benning Racing	6	Chevy	DAY; 14	ATL; 29	LVS; 26	MAR; 31	DOV; 27	KAN; 23	CLT; 31	TEX; 21	IOW; 20	GTW; 24	CHI; 31	KEN; 25	ELD; 32	POC; 25	MCH; 21	BRI; DNQ	MSP; 20	LVS; DNQ	TAL; DNQ	MAR; DNQ	TEX	PHO	HOM			22nd	193	
2019	Norm Benning Racing	6	Chevy	DAY; DNQ	ATL; 29	LVS; 28	MAR; DNQ	TEX; DNQ	DOV; 32	KAN; 21	CLT	TEX; 17	IOW; 24	GTW; 25	CHI; 29	KEN; DNQ	POC; 22	ELD; 22	MCH; 32	BRI	MSP; 24	LVS	TAL; 18	MAR; 24	PHO	HOM			25th	171	
2020	Norm Benning Racing	6	Chevy	DAY; DNQ	LVS	CLT; DNQ	ATL; DNQ	HOM; 34	POC; 30	KEN; 40	TEX; 34	KAN; 36	KAN; 25	MCH; 31	DRC; 27	DOV; 35	GTW; 29	DAR; 32	RCH; 30	BRI; 34	LVS	TAL; 22	KAN; 31	TEX; 26	MAR; 26	PHO			36th	128	
2021	Norm Benning Racing	6	Chevy	DAY; DNQ	DRC; 32	LVS; 33	ATL; 40	BRD; 37	RCH; 32	KAN; 39	DAR; 37	COA	CLT	TEX; 30	NSH	POC; 32	KNX; 19	GLN; 37	GTW; Wth	DAR; 35	BRI; DNQ	LVS	TAL; 17	MAR; DNQ	PHO; DNQ				43rd	71	
2022	Norm Benning Racing	6	Chevy	DAY	LVS	ATL	COA	MAR	BRD; DNQ	DAR	KAN	TEX	CLT	GTW	SON	KNX; DNQ	NSH	MOH	POC; DNQ	IRP	RCH; DNQ	KAN	BRI	TAL	HOM	PHO			112th	—	
2023	G2G Racing	46	Toyota	DAY; DNQ	LVS	ATL	COA	TEX																					57th	22	
2023	Norm Benning Racing	6	Chevy						BRD; 24	MAR	KAN	DAR	NWS; DNQ	CLT	GTW; 28	NSH	MOH	POC; DNQ	RCH	IRP	MLW	KAN	BRI	TAL	HOM	PHO			57th	22	
2024	Norm Benning Racing	6	Chevy	DAY	ATL	LVS	BRI	COA	MAR	TEX	KAN	DAR	NWS	CLT	GTW	NSH	POC	IRP	RCH	MLW; DNQ	BRI	KAN	TAL; 21	HOM	MAR; 36	PHO			58th	17	
2025	Norm Benning Racing	6	Chevy	DAY; 16	ATL	LVS	HOM	MAR; 34	BRI; 34	CAR; 35	TEX	KAN	NWS; 34	CLT	NSH	MCH; 32	POC; 34	LRP; Wth	IRP; 31	GLN	RCH; Wth	DAR	BRI; 34	NHA; 34	ROV	TAL; 32	MAR; 33	PHO	36th	61	
2026	Norm Benning Racing	6	Chevy	DAY; DNQ	ATL	STP	DAR	ROC	BRI	TEX	GLN	DOV	CLT	NSS	MCH	COR	LRP	NWS	IRP	RCH	NHA	BRI	KAN	CLT	PHO	TAL; DNQ	MAR	HOM	123rd	0	

^{*} Season still in progress
^{1} Ineligible for series points

=== ARCA Re/Max Series ===
(key) (Bold – Pole position awarded by qualifying time. Italics – Pole position earned by points standings or practice time. * – Most laps led.)

ARCA Re/Max Series results
Year	Team	No.	Make	1	2	3	4	5	6	7	8	9	10	11	12	13	14	15	16	17	18	19	20	21	22	23	24	25	ARMC	Pts	Ref
1989	O'Neil Racing	99	Chevy	DAY	ATL	KIL	TAL; DNQ	FRS	POC	KIL	HAG	POC	TAL; DNQ	DEL	FRS	ISF	TOL	DSF	SLM	ATL									N/A	—	
1995	Norm Benning Racing	84	Chevy	DAY	ATL	TAL	FIF	KIL	FRS	MCH	I80	MCS	FRS	POC	POC	KIL	FRS	SBS	LVL	ISF	DSF	SLM	WIN	ATL; 24					104th	—	
1996	Norm Benning Racing	84	Chevy	DAY; DNQ	ATL; 34	SLM	TAL	FIF	LVL	CLT; 15	CLT; 19	KIL	FRS	POC; 8	MCH; 20	FRS	TOL	POC; 8	MCH; 18	INF	SBS	ISF	DSF	KIL	SLM; 29	WIN; 25	CLT; 38	ATL; 28	18th	—	
1997	Norm Benning Racing	84	Chevy	DAY; DNQ	ATL; 24	SLM; 31	CLT; 35	CLT; 22	POC; 26	MCH; 36	SBS; 21	TOL; 21	KIL; 19	FRS; 22	MIN; 13	POC; 33	MCH; 22	DSF; 19	GTW; 24	SLM; 19		CLT; 19	TAL; 15	ISF; 34	ATL; 36				8th	3385	
1997	Norm Benning Racing	64	Chevy																		WIN; 18								8th	3385	
1998	Norm Benning Racing	84	Chevy	DAY; 29	ATL; 12	SLM; 14	CLT; 29	MEM; 8	MCH; 39	POC; 32	SBS; 15	TOL; 19	PPR; 24	POC; 36	KIL; 20	FRS; 16	ISF; 7	ATL; 21	DSF; 12	SLM; 16	TEX; 13	WIN; 14	CLT; 38	TAL; 23	ATL; 32				8th	4035	
1999	Norm Benning Racing	84	Chevy	DAY; 30	ATL; 15	SLM; 23	AND; 12	CLT; 27	MCH; 22	POC; 18	TOL; 23	SBS; 17	BLN; 19	POC; 15	KIL; 15	FRS; 16	FLM; 16	ISF; 6	WIN; 11	DSF; 10	SLM; 28	CLT; 26	TAL; 23	ATL; 20					10th	4135	
2000	Norm Benning Racing	84	Chevy	DAY; 23	SLM; 6	AND; 8	CLT; 25	KIL; 8	FRS; 17	MCH; 15	POC; 20	TOL; 19	KEN; 14	BLN; 25	POC; 11	WIN; 22	ISF; 10	KEN; 15	DSF; 7	SLM; 23	CLT; 24	TAL; 9	ATL; 32						9th	3950	
2001	Norm Benning Racing	84	Chevy	DAY; 30	NSH; 21	WIN; 14	SLM; 17	GTW; 18		CLT; 14	KAN; 12	MCH; 22	POC; 23	MEM; 11		KEN; 11	MCH; 20	POC; 18	NSH; 10	ISF; 26	CHI; 15	DSF; 30	SLM; 14	TOL; 9	BLN; 13	CLT; 16	TAL; 31	ATL; 19	5th	4750	
2001	Norm Benning Racing	4	Chevy						KEN; 26																				5th	4750	
2001	Norm Benning Racing	64	Chevy												GLN; 15														5th	4750	
2002	Norm Benning Racing	84	Chevy	DAY; 33	ATL; 25	NSH; 18	SLM; 10	KEN; 14	CLT; 22	KAN; 14	POC; 14	MCH; 23	TOL; 12	SBO; 20	KEN; 22	BLN; 19	POC; 30	NSH; 20	ISF; 6	WIN; 9	DSF; 21	CHI; 16	SLM; 21	TAL; 21	CLT; 26				10th	4230	
2003	Norm Benning Racing	84	Chevy	DAY; 21	ATL; 40	NSH; 22	SLM; 8	TOL; 26	KEN; 27	CLT; 26	BLN; 21	KAN; 31	MCH; 24	LER; 16	POC; 31	POC; 40	NSH; 25	ISF; 5	WIN; 14	DSF; 4	CHI; 21	SLM; 8	TAL; 18	CLT; 28	SBO; 8				13th	4015	
2004	Norm Benning Racing	84	Chevy	DAY; 31	NSH; 31	SLM; 18	KEN; 24	TOL; 8	CLT; 33	KAN; 17	POC; 17	MCH; 21	SBO; 4	BLN; 11	KEN; 28	GTW; 14	POC; 16	LER; 11	NSH; 22	ISF; 3		DSF; 7	CHI; 19	SLM; 4	TAL; 25				10th	4445	
2004	Norm Benning Racing	7	Chevy																		TOL; 9								10th	4445	
2005	Norm Benning Racing	84	Chevy	DAY; 10	NSH; 19	SLM; 19	KEN; 33	TOL; 13	LAN; 22	MIL; 35	POC; 13	MCH; 23	KAN; 19	KEN; 30	BLN; 18	POC; 24	GTW; 28	LER; 25	NSH; 31	MCH; 22	ISF; 13	TOL; 19	DSF; 23	CHI; 19	SLM; 20	TAL; 20			11th	4050	
2006	Norm Benning Racing	84	Chevy	DAY; 21	NSH; 30	SLM; 15	WIN; 14	KEN; 26	TOL; 23	POC; 35	MCH; 30	KAN; 17	KEN; 19	BLN; 20	POC; 29	GTW; 19	NSH; 17	MCH; 25	ISF; 7	MIL; 22	TOL; 17	DSF; 14	CHI; 19	SLM; 14	TAL; 27	IOW; 19			11th	4150	
2007	Norm Benning Racing	84	Chevy	DAY; 24	USA; 23	NSH; 29	SLM; 15	KAN; 29	WIN; 13	KEN; 25	TOL; 13	IOW; 23	POC; 22	MCH; 26	BLN; 18	KEN; 30	POC; 19	NSH; 22	ISF; 17	MIL; 14	GTW; 23	DSF; 34	CHI; 18	SLM; 20	TAL; 40	TOL; 23			12th	3940	
2008	Norm Benning Racing	84	Chevy	DAY; 31	SLM; 10	IOW; 21	KAN; 26	CAR; 26	KEN; 24	TOL; 22	POC; 17	MCH; 39	CAY; 13	KEN; 24	BLN; 21	POC; 31	NSH; 23	ISF; 27	DSF; 20	CHI; 25	SLM	NJE; 33	TAL; 18	TOL; 17					19th	3260	
2009	Norm Benning Racing	84	Chevy	DAY; 10	SLM; 14	CAR; 32	TAL	KEN	TOL	POC	MCH	MFD												CAR; 35					37th	770	
2009	Norm Benning Racing	8	Chevy										IOW; 35	KEN	BLN	POC	ISF	CHI	TOL	DSF	NJE	SLM	KAN						37th	770	
