= 1999 UAW-GM Quality 500 =

29th race of the 1999 NASCAR Winston Cup Series

Race details
- Race 29 of 34 in the 1999 NASCAR Winston Cup Series
- The 1999 UAW-GM Quality 500 program cover, with artwork by NASCAR artist Sam Bass.
- Date: October 11, 1999
- Official name: 40th Annual UAW-GM Quality 500
- Location: Concord, North Carolina, Lowe's Motor Speedway
- Course: Permanent racing facility
- Course length: 1.5 miles (2.41 km)
- Distance: 334 laps, 501 mi (806.281 km)
- Average speed: 160.306 miles per hour (257.987 km/h)
- Attendance: 125,000

Pole position
Driver	Bobby Labonte	Joe Gibbs Racing
- Time: 29.082

Most laps led
Driver	Bobby Labonte	Joe Gibbs Racing
- Laps: 136

Winner
No. 24	Jeff Gordon	Hendrick Motorsports

Television in the United States
- Network: TBS
- Announcers: Allen Bestwick, Buddy Baker, Dick Berggren

Radio in the United States
- Radio: Performance Racing Network

The 1999 UAW-GM Quality 500 was the 29th stock car race of the 1999 NASCAR Winston Cup Series and the 42nd iteration of the event. The race was originally scheduled to be held on Sunday, October 10, 1999, but was delayed to Monday, October 11 due to inclement weather. The race was held in front of an audience of 125,000 in Concord, North Carolina, at Lowe's Motor Speedway, a 1.5 miles (2.4 km) permanent quad-oval. The race took the scheduled 334 laps to complete. In the closing laps of the race, Hendrick Motorsports driver Jeff Gordon would manage to close in and pass for the lead with eight to go to take his 49th career NASCAR Winston Cup Series victory and his seventh and final victory of the season. To fill out the podium, Joe Gibbs Racing driver Bobby Labonte and Richard Childress Racing driver Mike Skinner would finish second and third, respectively.

== Background ==
The layout of Lowe's Motor Speedway, the venue where the race was held.

Lowe's Motor Speedway is a motorsports complex located in Concord, North Carolina, United States 13 miles from Charlotte, North Carolina. The complex features a 1.5 miles (2.4 km) quad oval track that hosts NASCAR racing including the prestigious Coca-Cola 600 on Memorial Day weekend and the NEXTEL All-Star Challenge, as well as the UAW-GM Quality 500. The speedway was built in 1959 by Bruton Smith and is considered the home track for NASCAR with many race teams located in the Charlotte area. The track is owned and operated by Speedway Motorsports (SMI) with Marcus Smith (son of Bruton Smith) as track president.

=== Entry list ===
- (R) denotes rookie driver.

#	Driver	Team	Make
1	Steve Park	Dale Earnhardt, Inc.	Chevrolet
2	Rusty Wallace	Penske-Kranefuss Racing	Ford
3	Dale Earnhardt	Richard Childress Racing	Chevrolet
4	Bobby Hamilton	Morgan–McClure Motorsports	Chevrolet
5	Terry Labonte	Hendrick Motorsports	Chevrolet
6	Mark Martin	Roush Racing	Ford
7	Michael Waltrip	Mattei Motorsports	Chevrolet
9	Rich Bickle	Melling Racing	Ford
10	Ricky Rudd	Rudd Performance Motorsports	Ford
11	Brett Bodine	Brett Bodine Racing	Ford
12	Jeremy Mayfield	Penske-Kranefuss Racing	Ford
14	Buckshot Jones	Irvan-Simo Racing	Ford
15	Derrike Cope	Fenley-Moore Motorsports	Ford
16	Kevin Lepage	Roush Racing	Ford
17	Matt Kenseth	Roush Racing	Ford
18	Bobby Labonte	Joe Gibbs Racing	Pontiac
20	Tony Stewart (R)	Joe Gibbs Racing	Pontiac
21	Elliott Sadler (R)	Wood Brothers Racing	Ford
22	Ward Burton	Bill Davis Racing	Pontiac
23	Jimmy Spencer	Haas-Carter Motorsports	Ford
24	Jeff Gordon	Hendrick Motorsports	Chevrolet
25	Wally Dallenbach Jr.	Hendrick Motorsports	Chevrolet
26	Johnny Benson Jr.	Roush Racing	Ford
28	Kenny Irwin Jr.	Robert Yates Racing	Ford
30	Todd Bodine	Bahari Racing	Pontiac
31	Mike Skinner	Richard Childress Racing	Chevrolet
33	Ken Schrader	Andy Petree Racing	Chevrolet
36	Jerry Nadeau	MB2 Motorsports	Pontiac
40	Sterling Marlin	Team SABCO	Chevrolet
41	Dick Trickle	Larry Hedrick Motorsports	Chevrolet
42	Joe Nemechek	Team SABCO	Chevrolet
43	John Andretti	Petty Enterprises	Pontiac
44	Kyle Petty	Petty Enterprises	Pontiac
45	David Green	Tyler Jet Motorsports	Pontiac
50	Ricky Craven	Midwest Transit Racing	Chevrolet
55	Kenny Wallace	Andy Petree Racing	Chevrolet
58	Hut Stricklin	SBIII Motorsports	Ford
60	Geoff Bodine	Joe Bessey Racing	Chevrolet
66	Darrell Waltrip	Haas-Carter Motorsports	Ford
71	Dave Marcis	Marcis Auto Racing	Chevrolet
75	Ted Musgrave	Butch Mock Motorsports	Ford
77	Robert Pressley	Jasper Motorsports	Ford
80	Gary Bradberry	Hover Motorsports	Ford
88	Dale Jarrett	Robert Yates Racing	Ford
90	Ed Berrier	Donlavey Racing	Ford
91	Andy Hillenburg	LJ Racing	Chevrolet
94	Bill Elliott	Bill Elliott Racing	Ford
97	Chad Little	Roush Racing	Ford
98	Rick Mast	Cale Yarborough Motorsports	Ford
99	Jeff Burton	Roush Racing	Ford
Official entry list

== Practice ==
=== First practice ===
The first practice session was held on Wednesday, October 6, at 2:00 PM EST. The session would last for three hours. Bobby Labonte, driving for Joe Gibbs Racing, would set the fastest time in the session, with a lap of 29.242 and an average speed of 184.665 mph (297.190 km/h).

Pos.	#	Driver	Team	Make	Time	Speed
1	18	Bobby Labonte	Joe Gibbs Racing	Pontiac	29.242	184.665
2	6	Mark Martin	Roush Racing	Ford	29.326	184.136
3	12	Jeremy Mayfield	Penske-Kranefuss Racing	Ford	29.338	184.061
Full first practice results

=== Second practice ===
The second practice session was held on Thursday, October 7, at 9:00 AM EST. The session would last for 55 minutes. Johnny Benson Jr., driving for Roush Racing, would set the fastest time in the session, with a lap of 29.711 and an average speed of 181.750 mph (292.498 km/h).

Pos.	#	Driver	Team	Make	Time	Speed
1	26	Johnny Benson Jr.	Roush Racing	Ford	29.711	181.750
2	42	Joe Nemechek	Team SABCO	Chevrolet	29.776	181.354
3	6	Mark Martin	Roush Racing	Ford	29.781	181.323
Full second practice results

=== Third practice ===
The third practice session was held on Thursday, October 7, at 12:35 PM EST. The session would last for 40 minutes. Mark Martin, driving for Roush Racing, would set the fastest time in the session, with a lap of 29.847 and an average speed of 180.922 mph (291.166 km/h).

Pos.	#	Driver	Team	Make	Time	Speed
1	6	Mark Martin	Roush Racing	Ford	29.847	180.922
2	18	Bobby Labonte	Joe Gibbs Racing	Pontiac	29.927	180.439
3	2	Rusty Wallace	Penske-Kranefuss Racing	Ford	30.127	179.241
Full third practice results

=== Final practice ===
The final practice session, sometimes referred to as Happy Hour, was held on Saturday, October 9. The session would last for one hour. Bobby Labonte, driving for Joe Gibbs Racing, would set the fastest time in the session, with a lap of 30.321 and an average speed of 178.094 mph (286.615 km/h).

Pos.	#	Driver	Team	Make	Time	Speed
1	18	Bobby Labonte	Joe Gibbs Racing	Pontiac	30.321	178.094
2	99	Jeff Burton	Roush Racing	Ford	30.323	178.082
3	12	Jeremy Mayfield	Penske-Kranefuss Racing	Ford	30.327	178.059
Full Happy Hour practice results

== Qualifying ==
Qualifying was split into two rounds. The first round was held on Wedesnday, October 6, at 7:00 PM EST. Each driver would have one lap to set a time. During the first round, the top 25 drivers in the round would be guaranteed a starting spot in the race. If a driver was not able to guarantee a spot in the first round, they had the option to scrub their time from the first round and try and run a faster lap time in a second round qualifying run, held on Thursday, October 7, at 10:45 AM EST. As with the first round, each driver would have one lap to set a time. Positions 26-36 would be decided on time, while positions 37-43 would be based on provisionals. Six spots are awarded by the use of provisionals based on owner's points. The seventh is awarded to a past champion who has not otherwise qualified for the race. If no past champion needs the provisional, the next team in the owner points will be awarded a provisional.

Bobby Labonte, driving for Joe Gibbs Racing, would win the pole, setting a time of 29.082 and an average speed of 185.682 miles per hour (298.826 km/h).

Seven drivers would fail to qualify: Darrell Waltrip, Buckshot Jones, Dave Marcis, Ed Berrier, Gary Bradberry, Hut Stricklin, and Andy Hillenburg.

=== Full qualifying results ===
Pos.	#	Driver	Team	Make	Time	Speed
1	18	Bobby Labonte	Joe Gibbs Racing	Pontiac	29.082	185.682
2	2	Rusty Wallace	Penske-Kranefuss Racing	Ford	29.184	185.033
3	43	John Andretti	Petty Enterprises	Pontiac	29.230	184.742
4	6	Mark Martin	Roush Racing	Ford	29.243	184.660
5	20	Tony Stewart (R)	Joe Gibbs Racing	Pontiac	29.377	183.817
6	22	Ward Burton	Bill Davis Racing	Pontiac	29.389	183.742
7	23	Jimmy Spencer	Haas-Carter Motorsports	Ford	29.391	183.730
8	98	Rick Mast	Cale Yarborough Motorsports	Ford	29.398	183.686
9	88	Dale Jarrett	Robert Yates Racing	Ford	29.399	183.680
10	36	Jerry Nadeau	MB2 Motorsports	Pontiac	29.433	183.468
11	55	Kenny Wallace	Andy Petree Racing	Chevrolet	29.435	183.455
12	31	Mike Skinner	Richard Childress Racing	Chevrolet	29.438	183.436
13	5	Terry Labonte	Hendrick Motorsports	Chevrolet	29.439	183.430
14	1	Steve Park	Dale Earnhardt, Inc.	Chevrolet	29.444	183.399
15	4	Bobby Hamilton	Morgan–McClure Motorsports	Chevrolet	29.460	183.299
16	75	Ted Musgrave	Butch Mock Motorsports	Ford	29.467	183.256
17	3	Dale Earnhardt	Richard Childress Racing	Chevrolet	29.512	182.976
18	16	Kevin Lepage	Roush Racing	Ford	29.524	182.902
19	60	Geoff Bodine	Joe Bessey Racing	Chevrolet	29.540	182.803
20	12	Jeremy Mayfield	Penske-Kranefuss Racing	Ford	29.555	182.710
21	10	Ricky Rudd	Rudd Performance Motorsports	Ford	29.582	182.543
22	24	Jeff Gordon	Hendrick Motorsports	Chevrolet	29.588	182.506
23	7	Michael Waltrip	Mattei Motorsports	Chevrolet	29.593	182.476
24	15	Derrike Cope	Fenley-Moore Motorsports	Ford	29.597	182.451
25	30	Todd Bodine	Bahari Racing	Pontiac	29.611	182.365
26	42	Joe Nemechek	Team SABCO	Chevrolet	29.568	182.630
27	17	Matt Kenseth	Roush Racing	Ford	29.632	182.235
28	50	Ricky Craven	Midwest Transit Racing	Chevrolet	29.641	182.180
29	94	Bill Elliott	Bill Elliott Racing	Ford	29.649	182.131
30	11	Brett Bodine	Brett Bodine Racing	Ford	29.655	182.094
31	40	Sterling Marlin	Team SABCO	Chevrolet	29.674	181.977
32	45	David Green	Tyler Jet Motorsports	Pontiac	29.681	181.935
33	97	Chad Little	Roush Racing	Ford	29.683	181.922
34	28	Kenny Irwin Jr.	Robert Yates Racing	Ford	29.684	181.916
35	33	Ken Schrader	Andy Petree Racing	Chevrolet	29.718	181.708
36	41	Dick Trickle	Larry Hedrick Motorsports	Chevrolet	29.756	181.476
Provisionals
37	99	Jeff Burton	Roush Racing	Ford	-*	-*
38	25	Wally Dallenbach Jr.	Hendrick Motorsports	Chevrolet	-*	-*
39	26	Johnny Benson Jr.	Roush Racing	Ford	-*	-*
40	21	Elliott Sadler (R)	Wood Brothers Racing	Ford	-*	-*
41	44	Kyle Petty	Petty Enterprises	Pontiac	-*	-*
42	9	Rich Bickle	Melling Racing	Ford	-*	-*
43	77	Robert Pressley	Jasper Motorsports	Ford	-*	-*
Failed to qualify
44	66	Darrell Waltrip	Haas-Carter Motorsports	Ford	29.848	180.917
45	14	Buckshot Jones	Irvan-Simo Racing	Ford	29.996	180.024
46	71	Dave Marcis	Marcis Auto Racing	Chevrolet	30.012	179.928
47	90	Ed Berrier	Donlavey Racing	Ford	30.048	179.712
48	80	Gary Bradberry	Hover Motorsports	Ford	30.080	179.521
49	58	Hut Stricklin	SBIII Motorsports	Ford	30.248	178.524
50	91	Andy Hillenburg	LJ Racing	Chevrolet	31.774	169.950
Official first round qualifying results
Official starting lineup

== Race results ==
Fin	St	#	Driver	Team	Make	Laps	Led	Status	Pts	Winnings
1	22	24	Jeff Gordon	Hendrick Motorsports	Chevrolet	334	16	running	180	$140,350
2	1	18	Bobby Labonte	Joe Gibbs Racing	Pontiac	334	136	running	180	$157,250
3	12	31	Mike Skinner	Richard Childress Racing	Chevrolet	334	65	running	170	$87,800
4	4	6	Mark Martin	Roush Racing	Ford	334	59	running	165	$85,750
5	6	22	Ward Burton	Bill Davis Racing	Pontiac	334	3	running	160	$73,075
6	20	12	Jeremy Mayfield	Penske-Kranefuss Racing	Ford	334	0	running	150	$57,000
7	9	88	Dale Jarrett	Robert Yates Racing	Ford	334	33	running	151	$65,475
8	2	2	Rusty Wallace	Penske-Kranefuss Racing	Ford	333	18	running	147	$60,250
9	18	16	Kevin Lepage	Roush Racing	Ford	333	0	running	138	$46,950
10	14	1	Steve Park	Dale Earnhardt, Inc.	Chevrolet	333	0	running	134	$46,750
11	29	94	Bill Elliott	Bill Elliott Racing	Ford	332	0	running	130	$46,490
12	17	3	Dale Earnhardt	Richard Childress Racing	Chevrolet	332	0	running	127	$44,450
13	26	42	Joe Nemechek	Team SABCO	Chevrolet	332	0	running	124	$42,700
14	23	7	Michael Waltrip	Mattei Motorsports	Chevrolet	332	0	running	121	$39,100
15	34	28	Kenny Irwin Jr.	Robert Yates Racing	Ford	332	2	running	123	$43,240
16	39	26	Johnny Benson Jr.	Roush Racing	Ford	332	0	running	115	$39,350
17	3	43	John Andretti	Petty Enterprises	Pontiac	332	0	running	112	$42,600
18	33	97	Chad Little	Roush Racing	Ford	331	0	running	109	$33,300
19	5	20	Tony Stewart (R)	Joe Gibbs Racing	Pontiac	331	0	running	106	$39,315
20	19	60	Geoff Bodine	Joe Bessey Racing	Chevrolet	331	0	running	103	$27,065
21	13	5	Terry Labonte	Hendrick Motorsports	Chevrolet	331	0	running	100	$37,510
22	15	4	Bobby Hamilton	Morgan–McClure Motorsports	Chevrolet	330	1	running	102	$36,270
23	35	33	Ken Schrader	Andy Petree Racing	Chevrolet	330	0	running	94	$32,270
24	43	77	Robert Pressley	Jasper Motorsports	Ford	330	0	running	91	$24,120
25	8	98	Rick Mast	Cale Yarborough Motorsports	Ford	330	0	running	88	$24,670
26	40	21	Elliott Sadler (R)	Wood Brothers Racing	Ford	329	0	running	85	$31,270
27	30	11	Brett Bodine	Brett Bodine Racing	Ford	329	0	running	82	$30,470
28	7	23	Jimmy Spencer	Haas-Carter Motorsports	Ford	329	0	running	79	$30,870
29	31	40	Sterling Marlin	Team SABCO	Chevrolet	329	0	running	76	$30,170
30	11	55	Kenny Wallace	Andy Petree Racing	Chevrolet	329	0	running	73	$22,795
31	16	75	Ted Musgrave	Butch Mock Motorsports	Ford	329	0	running	70	$19,970
32	41	44	Kyle Petty	Petty Enterprises	Pontiac	329	0	running	67	$19,870
33	38	25	Wally Dallenbach Jr.	Hendrick Motorsports	Chevrolet	329	0	running	64	$26,815
34	10	36	Jerry Nadeau	MB2 Motorsports	Pontiac	328	0	running	61	$27,070
35	24	15	Derrike Cope	Fenley-Moore Motorsports	Ford	328	0	running	58	$19,740
36	25	30	Todd Bodine	Bahari Racing	Pontiac	327	0	running	55	$19,720
37	37	99	Jeff Burton	Roush Racing	Ford	306	0	crash	52	$36,305
38	21	10	Ricky Rudd	Rudd Performance Motorsports	Ford	278	0	running	49	$26,695
39	42	9	Rich Bickle	Melling Racing	Ford	263	1	alternator	51	$20,385
40	27	17	Matt Kenseth	Roush Racing	Ford	231	0	crash	43	$19,680
41	36	41	Dick Trickle	Larry Hedrick Motorsports	Chevrolet	229	0	oil leak	40	$19,675
42	32	45	David Green	Tyler Jet Motorsports	Pontiac	162	0	engine	37	$19,670
43	28	50	Ricky Craven	Midwest Transit Racing	Chevrolet	143	0	handling	34	$19,869
Official race results

Previous race: 1999 NAPA Autocare 500	NASCAR Winston Cup Series; 1999 season	Next race: 1999 Winston 500
