= 1999 Pepsi 400 presented by Meijer =

Race details
- Race 22 of 34 in the 1999 NASCAR Winston Cup Series
- 1999 Pepsi 400 presented by Meijer program cover
- Date: August 22, 1999
- Location: Michigan Speedway, Brooklyn, Michigan, U.S.
- Course: Permanent racing facility
- Course length: 2.0 miles (3.219 km)
- Distance: 200 laps, 400 mi (643.738 km)
- Average speed: 144.332 miles per hour (232.280 km/h)

Pole position
| Driver | Ward Burton | Bill Davis Racing |
- Time: 38.127

Most laps led
| Driver | Jeff Gordon | Hendrick Motorsports |
- Laps: 73

Winner
| No. 18 | Bobby Labonte | Joe Gibbs Racing |

Television in the United States
- Network: ESPN
- Announcers: Bob Jenkins, Benny Parsons, and Ned Jarrett

The 1999 Pepsi 400 presented by Meijer was a NASCAR Winston Cup Series race that took place on August 22, 1999, at Michigan Speedway in Brooklyn, Michigan. This was the twenty-second race in the 1999 NASCAR Winston Cup Series schedule.

== Background ==
The Michigan Speedway is a 2-mile tri-oval built in 1969. The frontstretch is 3,600 feet while the backstretch is 2,242 feet. The track features 18 degrees in the corners, 12 degrees in the frontstretch, and 5 degrees in the backstretch.

Ernie Irvan suffered head and lung injuries in a Busch Series practice session the previous day. His #36 M&Ms Pontiac was relieved by Dick Trickle for this race. Ernie would later announce his retirement from racing two weeks later.

Future 2000 Winston Cup rookies and then-Busch Series championship contenders Dale Earnhardt Jr. and Matt Kenseth made one of their pre-rookie season starts in this race.

== Entry list ==
| Car | Driver | Team | Manufacturer |
|---|---|---|---|
| 1 | Steve Park | Dale Earnhardt, Inc. | Chevrolet |
| 2 | Rusty Wallace | Penske-Kranefuss Racing | Ford |
| 3 | Dale Earnhardt Sr. | Richard Childress Racing | Chevrolet |
| 4 | Bobby Hamilton | Morgan-McClure Motorsports | Chevrolet |
| 5 | Terry Labonte | Hendrick Motorsports | Chevrolet |
| 6 | Mark Martin | Roush Racing | Ford |
| 7 | Michael Waltrip | Mattei Motorsports | Chevrolet |
| 8 | Dale Earnhardt Jr | Dale Earnhardt, Inc. | Chevrolet |
| 9 | Jerry Nadeau | Melling Racing | Ford |
| 10 | Ricky Rudd | Rudd Performance Motorsports | Ford |
| 11 | Brett Bodine | Brett Bodine Racing | Ford |
| 12 | Jeremy Mayfield | Penske-Kranefuss Racing | Ford |
| 16 | Kevin Lepage | Roush Racing | Ford |
| 17 | Matt Kenseth | Roush Racing | Ford |
| 18 | Bobby Labonte | Joe Gibbs Racing | Pontiac |
| 19 | Tom Hubert | Roehrig Motorsports | Pontiac |
| 20 | Tony Stewart | Joe Gibbs Racing | Pontiac |
| 21 | Elliott Sadler | Wood Brothers Racing | Ford |
| 22 | Ward Burton | Bill Davis Racing | Pontiac |
| 23 | Jimmy Spencer | Travis Carter Enterprises | Ford |
| 24 | Jeff Gordon | Hendrick Motorsports | Chevrolet |
| 25 | Wally Dallenbach Jr. | Hendrick Motorsports | Chevrolet |
| 26 | Johnny Benson Jr. | Roush Racing | Ford |
| 28 | Kenny Irwin Jr. | Robert Yates Racing | Ford |
| 30 | Derrike Cope | Bahari Racing | Pontiac |
| 31 | Mike Skinner | Richard Childress Racing | Chevrolet |
| 33 | Ken Schrader | Andy Petree Racing | Chevrolet |
| 36 | Dick Trickle | MB2 Motorsports | Pontiac |
| 40 | Sterling Marlin | SABCO Racing | Chevrolet |
| 41 | David Green | Larry Hedrick Motorsports | Chevrolet |
| 42 | Joe Nemechek | SABCO Racing | Chevrolet |
| 43 | John Andretti | Petty Enterprises | Pontiac |
| 44 | Kyle Petty | Petty Enterprises | Pontiac |
| 45 | Rich Bickle | Tyler Jet Motorsports | Pontiac |
| 50 | Ricky Craven | Midwest Transit Racing | Chevrolet |
| 55 | Kenny Wallace | Andy Petree Racing | Chevrolet |
| 58 | Hut Stricklin | SBIII Motorsports | Ford |
| 60 | Geoff Bodine | Joe Bessey Motorsports | Chevrolet |
| 66 | Darrell Waltrip | Haas-Carter Motorsports | Ford |
| 71 | Dave Marcis | Marcis Auto Racing | Chevrolet |
| 75 | Ted Musgrave | Butch Mock Motorsports | Ford |
| 77 | Robert Pressley | Jasper Motorsports | Ford |
| 88 | Dale Jarrett | Robert Yates Racing | Ford |
| 90 | Stanton Barrett | Donlavey Racing | Ford |
| 94 | Bill Elliott | Bill Elliott Racing | Ford |
| 97 | Chad Little | Roush Racing | Ford |
| 98 | Rick Mast | Cale Yarborough Motorsports | Ford |
| 99 | Jeff Burton | Roush Racing | Ford |

== Qualifying ==
| Pos. | Driver | Car | Manufacturer | Time | Speed (mph) |
|---|---|---|---|---|---|
| 1 | Ward Burton | 22 | Pontiac | 38.127 | 188.843 |
| 2 | Mike Skinner | 31 | Chevrolet | 38.298 | 187.999 |
| 3 | Dale Jarrett | 88 | Ford | 38.382 | 187.588 |
| 4 | Geoffrey Bodine | 60 | Chevrolet | 38.387 | 187.563 |
| 5 | Jeremy Mayfield | 12 | Ford | 38.430 | 187.354 |
| 6 | Ricky Rudd | 10 | Ford | 38.464 | 187.188 |
| 7 | Mark Martin | 6 | Ford | 38.482 | 187.100 |
| 8 | John Andretti | 43 | Pontiac | 38.482 | 187.100 |
| 9 | Jeff Gordon | 24 | Chevrolet | 38.500 | 187.013 |
| 10 | Rusty Wallace | 2 | Ford | 38.512 | 186.955 |
| 11 | Ted Musgrave | 75 | Ford | 38.525 | 186.892 |
| 12 | Steve Park | 1 | Chevrolet | 38.540 | 186.819 |
| 13 | Hut Stricklin | 58 | Ford | 38.565 | 186.698 |
| 14 | Bill Elliott | 94 | Ford | 38.630 | 186.384 |
| 15 | Ernie Irvan | 36 | Pontiac | 38.687 | 186.109 |
| 16 | Chad Little | 97 | Ford | 38.696 | 186.066 |
| 17 | Dale Earnhardt Jr. | 8 | Chevrolet | 38.701 | 186.042 |
| 18 | Sterling Marlin | 40 | Chevrolet | 38.715 | 185.974 |
| 19 | Bobby Labonte | 18 | Pontiac | 38.732 | 185.893 |
| 20 | Michael Waltrip | 7 | Chevrolet | 38.754 | 185.787 |
| 21 | David Green | 41 | Chevrolet | 38.823 | 185.457 |
| 22 | Ricky Craven | 50 | Chevrolet | 38.834 | 185.405 |
| 23 | Kenny Wallace | 55 | Chevrolet | 38.863 | 185.266 |
| 24 | Wally Dallenbach Jr. | 25 | Chevrolet | 38.864 | 185.261 |
| 25 | Matt Kenseth | 17 | Ford | 38.886 | 185.157 |
| 26 | Jeff Burton | 99 | Ford | 38.867 | 185.247 |
| 27 | Robert Pressley | 77 | Ford | 38.889 | 185.142 |
| 28 | Ken Schrader | 33 | Chevrolet | 38.931 | 184.943 |
| 29 | Jerry Nadeau | 9 | Ford | 38.942 | 184.890 |
| 30 | Kenny Irwin Jr. | 28 | Ford | 38.966 | 184.776 |
| 31 | Rick Mast | 98 | Ford | 38.984 | 184.691 |
| 32 | Elliott Sadler | 21 | Ford | 38.992 | 184.653 |
| 33 | Kevin Lepage | 16 | Ford | 39.044 | 184.407 |
| 34 | Joe Nemechek | 42 | Chevrolet | 39.045 | 184.403 |
| 35 | Dave Marcis | 71 | Chevrolet | 39.058 | 184.341 |
| 36 | Jimmy Spencer | 23 | Ford | 39.069 | 184.289 |
Provisionals
| 37 | Tony Stewart | 20 | Pontiac | 0.000 | 0.000 |
| 38 | Dale Earnhardt | 3 | Chevrolet | 0.000 | 0.000 |
| 39 | Terry Labonte | 5 | Chevrolet | 0.000 | 0.000 |
| 40 | Bobby Hamilton | 4 | Chevrolet | 0.000 | 0.000 |
| 41 | Johnny Benson Jr. | 26 | Ford | 0.000 | 0.000 |
| 42 | Kyle Petty | 44 | Pontiac | 0.000 | 0.000 |
| 43 | Rich Bickle | 45 | Pontiac | 0.000 | 0.000 |
Failed to qualify
| 44 | Derrike Cope | 30 | Pontiac | 39.117 | 184.063 |
| 45 | Stanton Barrett | 90 | Ford | 39.136 | 183.974 |
| 46 | Darrell Waltrip | 66 | Ford | 39.302 | 183.197 |
| 47 | Brett Bodine | 11 | Ford | 39.458 | 182.473 |
| 48 | Tom Hubert | 19 | Pontiac | 40.613 | 177.283 |

Failed to qualify: Derrike Cope (#30), Stanton Barrett (#90), Darrell Waltrip (#66), Brett Bodine (#11), Tom Hubert (#19)

== Race recap ==
The race was very competitive with 24 lead changes among 11 drivers. Many underdog drivers ran very well throughout the race, including Chad Little, Jimmy Spencer, and the underfunded Hut Stricklin in the unsponsored SBIII Motorsports Ford. It was the only top 10 for the SBIII team.

The final 20 laps featured a fierce battle between the sport's then-current stars of Bobby Labonte, Dale Earnhardt, Tony Stewart, Dale Jarrett, and Jeff Gordon. At the end, it was Bobby Labonte who prevailed with his third win at Michigan and fourth of the 1999 season.

== Timeline ==
- Start: Ward Burton leads the field to the green flag.
- Lap 48: First caution is out for debris on pit road. The outside pole-sitter Mike Skinner broke a pinion gear while trying to leave his pit box during the first caution flag stop of the day.
- Lap 54: The pole-sitter Ward Burton got loose underneath Bobby Labonte and crashed hard into turn 3, causing the second caution.
- Lap 130: Robert Pressley crashed in turn 4, causing the third caution.
- Lap 141: Metal debris spotted in turn 1 causes the fourth caution.
- Lap 150: Dick Trickle, Ricky Rudd, and Kevin Lepage crashed in the frontstretch, causing the fifth caution.
- Lap 163: Tony Stewart made a move on Jeff Burton, made contact when coming up the track on the frontstretch, and sent Jeff Burton into the wall, causing the sixth caution.
- Lap 184: Bobby Labonte took the lead for the final time after a fierce battle with Dale Earnhardt and Jeff Gordon.
- Lap 200: Bobby Labonte takes the checkered flag.

== Results ==
| Fin | St | # | Driver | Make | Team | Laps | Led | Status | Pts | Winnings |
|---|---|---|---|---|---|---|---|---|---|---|
| 1 | 19 | 18 | Bobby Labonte | Pontiac | Joe Gibbs Racing | 200 | 45 | running | 180 | 121320 |
| 2 | 9 | 24 | Jeff Gordon | Chevrolet | Hendrick Motorsports | 200 | 73 | running | 180 | 83030 |
| 3 | 37 | 20 | Tony Stewart | Pontiac | Joe Gibbs Racing | 200 | 4 | running | 170 | 60505 |
| 4 | 3 | 88 | Dale Jarrett | Ford | Robert Yates Racing | 200 | 27 | running | 165 | 57650 |
| 5 | 38 | 3 | Dale Earnhardt | Chevrolet | Richard Childress Racing | 200 | 27 | running | 160 | 51005 |
| 6 | 16 | 97 | Chad Little | Ford | Roush Racing | 200 | 0 | running | 150 | 43790 |
| 7 | 7 | 6 | Mark Martin | Ford | Roush Racing | 200 | 4 | running | 151 | 47065 |
| 8 | 36 | 23 | Jimmy Spencer | Ford | Travis Carter Enterprises | 200 | 0 | running | 142 | 52590 |
| 9 | 13 | 58 | Hut Stricklin | Ford | SBIII Motorsports | 200 | 0 | running | 138 | 32140 |
| 10 | 8 | 43 | John Andretti | Pontiac | Petty Enterprises | 200 | 0 | running | 134 | 46590 |
| 11 | 32 | 21 | Elliott Sadler | Ford | Wood Brothers Racing | 200 | 0 | running | 130 | 39980 |
| 12 | 31 | 98 | Rick Mast | Ford | Cale Yarborough Motorsports | 200 | 0 | running | 127 | 33140 |
| 13 | 20 | 7 | Michael Waltrip | Chevrolet | Mattei Motorsports | 200 | 3 | running | 129 | 35640 |
| 14 | 25 | 17 | Matt Kenseth | Ford | Roush Racing | 200 | 0 | running | 121 | 25040 |
| 15 | 18 | 40 | Sterling Marlin | Chevrolet | SABCO Racing | 200 | 0 | running | 118 | 36190 |
| 16 | 10 | 2 | Rusty Wallace | Ford | Penske-Kranefuss Racing | 200 | 0 | running | 115 | 39190 |
| 17 | 4 | 60 | Geoffrey Bodine | Chevrolet | Joe Bessey Motorsports | 199 | 0 | running | 112 | 27065 |
| 18 | 5 | 12 | Jeremy Mayfield | Ford | Penske-Kranefuss Racing | 199 | 0 | running | 109 | 37740 |
| 19 | 14 | 94 | Bill Elliott | Ford | Dale Earnhardt, Inc. | 199 | 0 | running | 106 | 34180 |
| 20 | 12 | 1 | Steve Park | Chevrolet | Dale Earnhardt, Inc. | 199 | 0 | running | 103 | 35140 |
| 21 | 41 | 26 | Johnny Benson Jr. | Ford | Roush Racing | 199 | 0 | running | 100 | 34655 |
| 22 | 34 | 42 | Joe Nemechek | Chevrolet | SABCO Racing | 199 | 0 | running | 97 | 32490 |
| 23 | 24 | 25 | Wally Dallenbach Jr. | Chevrolet | Hendrick Motorsports | 199 | 3 | running | 99 | 32265 |
| 24 | 17 | 8 | Dale Earnhardt Jr. | Chevrolet | Dale Earnhardt, Inc. | 199 | 0 | running | 91 | 21765 |
| 25 | 28 | 33 | Ken Schrader | Chevrolet | Andy Petree Racing | 199 | 0 | running | 88 | 31915 |
| 26 | 39 | 5 | Terry Labonte | Chevrolet | Hendrick Motorsports | 199 | 0 | running | 85 | 36415 |
| 27 | 23 | 55 | Kenny Wallace | Chevrolet | Andy Petree Racing | 199 | 0 | running | 82 | 25140 |
| 28 | 43 | 45 | Rich Bickle | Pontiac | Tyler Jet Motorsports | 199 | 0 | running | 79 | 24690 |
| 29 | 29 | 9 | Jerry Nadeau | Ford | Melling Racing | 199 | 0 | running | 76 | 24190 |
| 30 | 22 | 50 | Ricky Craven | Chevrolet | Midwest Transit Racing | 198 | 0 | running | 73 | 21365 |
| 31 | 42 | 44 | Kyle Petty | Pontiac | Petty Enterprises | 198 | 0 | running | 70 | 23965 |
| 32 | 21 | 41 | David Green | Chevrolet | Larry Hedrick Motorsports | 197 | 0 | running | 67 | 23415 |
| 33 | 35 | 71 | Dave Marcis | Chevrolet | Marcis Auto Racing | 197 | 0 | running | 64 | 21365 |
| 34 | 30 | 28 | Kenny Irwin Jr. | Ford | Robert Yates Racing | 195 | 0 | engine | 61 | 28215 |
| 35 | 40 | 4 | Bobby Hamilton | Chevrolet | Morgan-McClure Motorsports | 192 | 0 | engine | 58 | 35765 |
| 36 | 2 | 31 | Mike Skinner | Chevrolet | Richard Childress Racing | 192 | 12 | running | 60 | 33040 |
| 37 | 26 | 99 | Jeff Burton | Ford | Roush Racing | 188 | 0 | running | 52 | 41715 |
| 38 | 6 | 10 | Ricky Rudd | Ford | Rudd Performance Motorsports | 186 | 0 | running | 49 | 27640 |
| 39 | 33 | 16 | Kevin Lepage | Ford | Roush Racing | 183 | 0 | engine | 46 | 27630 |
| 40 | 15 | 36 | Dick Trickle | Pontiac | MB2 Motorsports | 178 | 0 | running | 43 | 27620 |
| 41 | 11 | 75 | Ted Musgrave | Ford | Butch Mock Motorsports | 147 | 0 | running | 40 | 20610 |
| 42 | 27 | 77 | Robert Pressley | Ford | Jasper Motorsports | 127 | 1 | crash | 42 | 20800 |
| 43 | 1 | 22 | Ward Burton | Pontiac | Bill Davis Racing | 52 | 1 | crash | 39 | 33090 |
Failed to qualify or driver change
| 44 | | 30 | Derrike Cope | Pontiac | Bahari Racing | | | | | |
| 45 | | 90 | Stanton Barrett | Ford | Donlavey Racing | | | | | |
| 46 | | 66 | Darrell Waltrip | Ford | Haas-Carter Motorsports | | | | | |
| 47 | | 11 | Brett Bodine | Ford | Brett Bodine Racing | | | | | |
| 48 | | 19 | Tom Hubert | Pontiac | Roehrig Motorsports | | | | | |
| DC | | 36 | Ernie Irvan | Pontiac | MB2 Motorsports | | | | | |

== Post-Race Championship Standings ==
| Pos | Driver | Points | Differential |
|---|---|---|---|
| 1 | Dale Jarrett | 3524 | -- |
| 2 | Mark Martin | 3210 | 314 |
| 3 | Bobby Labonte | 3177 | 347 |
| 4 | Jeff Gordon | 3057 | 467 |
| 5 | Tony Stewart | 3031 | 493 |
| 6 | Jeff Burton | 2995 | 529 |
| 7 | Dale Earnhardt | 2864 | 660 |
| 8 | Rusty Wallace | 2626 | 898 |
| 9 | Terry Labonte | 2593 | 931 |
| 10 | Mike Skinner | 2566 | 958 |

| Preceded by 1999 Frontier at the Glen | NASCAR Winston Cup Series; 1999 | Succeeded by 1999 Goody's Headache Powder 500 |
