= 1999 Dura Lube/Kmart 300 =

26th race of the 1999 NASCAR Winston Cup Series

Race details
- Race 26 of 34 in the 1999 NASCAR Winston Cup Series
- The 1999 Dura Lube/Kmart 300 program cover.
- Date: September 19, 1999
- Official name: Third Annual Dura Lube/Kmart 300
- Location: Loudon, New Hampshire, New Hampshire International Speedway
- Course: Permanent racing facility
- Course length: 1.058 miles (1.703 km)
- Distance: 300 laps, 317.4 mi (510.805 km)
- Average speed: 100.673 miles per hour (162.017 km/h)

Pole position
Driver	Rusty Wallace	Penske-Kranefuss Racing
- Time: 29.339

Most laps led
Driver	Rusty Wallace	Penske-Kranefuss Racing
- Laps: 84

Winner
No. 42	Joe Nemechek	Team SABCO

Television in the United States
- Network: TNN
- Announcers: Eli Gold, Dick Berggren, Buddy Baker

Radio in the United States
- Radio: Motor Racing Network

The 1999 Dura Lube/Kmart 300 was the 26th stock car race of the 1999 NASCAR Winston Cup Series season and the third iteration of the event. The race was held on Sunday, September 19, 1999, in Loudon, New Hampshire, at New Hampshire International Speedway, a 1.058-mile (1.703 km) permanent, oval-shaped, low-banked racetrack. The race took the scheduled 300 laps to complete. Within the final laps of the race, Team SABCO driver Joe Nemechek would manage to fend off eventual second-place finisher, Joe Gibbs Racing driver Tony Stewart when a caution with three to go would come to end the race under caution. The win was Nemechek's first career NASCAR Winston Cup Series victory and his only win of the season. To fill out the podium, Joe Gibbs Racing driver Bobby Labonte would finish third.

== Background ==
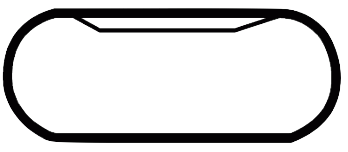
The layout of New Hampshire International Speedway, the venue where the race was held.

New Hampshire International Speedway is a 1.058-mile (1.703 km) oval speedway located in Loudon, New Hampshire which has hosted NASCAR racing annually since the early 1990s, as well as an IndyCar weekend and the oldest motorcycle race in North America, the Loudon Classic. Nicknamed "The Magic Mile", the speedway is often converted into a 1.6-mile (2.6 km) road course, which includes much of the oval. The track was originally the site of Bryar Motorsports Park before being purchased and redeveloped by Bob Bahre. The track is currently one of eight major NASCAR tracks owned and operated by Speedway Motorsports.

=== Entry list ===
- (R) denotes rookie driver.

#	Driver	Team	Make
1	Steve Park	Dale Earnhardt, Inc.	Chevrolet
2	Rusty Wallace	Penske-Kranefuss Racing	Ford
3	Dale Earnhardt	Richard Childress Racing	Chevrolet
4	Bobby Hamilton	Morgan–McClure Motorsports	Chevrolet
5	Terry Labonte	Hendrick Motorsports	Chevrolet
6	Mark Martin	Roush Racing	Ford
7	Michael Waltrip	Mattei Motorsports	Chevrolet
9	Rich Bickle	Melling Racing	Ford
10	Ricky Rudd	Rudd Performance Motorsports	Ford
11	Brett Bodine	Brett Bodine Racing	Ford
12	Jeremy Mayfield	Penske-Kranefuss Racing	Ford
14	Randy LaJoie	Irvan-Simo Racing	Ford
16	Kevin Lepage	Roush Racing	Ford
18	Bobby Labonte	Joe Gibbs Racing	Pontiac
20	Tony Stewart (R)	Joe Gibbs Racing	Pontiac
21	Elliott Sadler (R)	Wood Brothers Racing	Ford
22	Ward Burton	Bill Davis Racing	Pontiac
23	Jimmy Spencer	Haas-Carter Motorsports	Ford
24	Jeff Gordon	Hendrick Motorsports	Chevrolet
25	Wally Dallenbach Jr.	Hendrick Motorsports	Chevrolet
26	Johnny Benson Jr.	Roush Racing	Ford
28	Kenny Irwin Jr.	Robert Yates Racing	Ford
30	Todd Bodine	Bahari Racing	Pontiac
31	Mike Skinner	Richard Childress Racing	Chevrolet
33	Ken Schrader	Andy Petree Racing	Chevrolet
36	Jerry Nadeau	MB2 Motorsports	Pontiac
40	Sterling Marlin	Team SABCO	Chevrolet
41	Dick Trickle	Larry Hedrick Motorsports	Chevrolet
42	Joe Nemechek	Team SABCO	Chevrolet
43	John Andretti	Petty Enterprises	Pontiac
44	Kyle Petty	Petty Enterprises	Pontiac
45	David Green	Tyler Jet Motorsports	Pontiac
50	Ricky Craven	Midwest Transit Racing	Chevrolet
55	Kenny Wallace	Andy Petree Racing	Chevrolet
58	Hut Stricklin	SBIII Motorsports	Ford
60	Geoff Bodine	Joe Bessey Racing	Chevrolet
66	Darrell Waltrip	Haas-Carter Motorsports	Ford
71	Dave Marcis	Marcis Auto Racing	Chevrolet
75	Ted Musgrave	Butch Mock Motorsports	Ford
77	Robert Pressley	Jasper Motorsports	Ford
79	Andy Belmont	T.R.I.X. Racing	Ford
88	Dale Jarrett	Robert Yates Racing	Ford
91	Derrike Cope	LJ Racing	Chevrolet
94	Bill Elliott	Bill Elliott Racing	Ford
97	Chad Little	Roush Racing	Ford
98	Rick Mast	Cale Yarborough Motorsports	Ford
99	Jeff Burton	Roush Racing	Ford
Official entry list

== Practice ==
Originally, three practice sessions were scheduled to be held, with one on Friday, September 17 and two on Saturday, September 18. However, due to inclement rain from Hurricane Floyd on Friday, the lone Friday session was cancelled.

=== First practice ===
The first practice session was held on Saturday, September 18, at 8:30 AM EST. The session would last for two hours. Rusty Wallace, driving for Penske-Kranefuss Racing, would set the fastest time in the session, with a lap of 29.323 and an average speed of 129.891 mph (209.039 km/h).

Pos.	#	Driver	Team	Make	Time	Speed
1	2	Rusty Wallace	Penske-Kranefuss Racing	Ford	29.323	129.891
2	6	Mark Martin	Roush Racing	Ford	29.381	129.634
3	26	Johnny Benson Jr.	Roush Racing	Ford	29.412	129.498
Full first practice results

=== Final practice ===
The final practice session, sometimes referred to as Happy Hour, was held on Saturday, September 18. The session would last for one hour. Joe Nemechek, driving for Team SABCO, would set the fastest time in the session, with a lap of 29.585 and an average speed of 128.740 mph (207.187 km/h).

Pos.	#	Driver	Team	Make	Time	Speed
1	42	Joe Nemechek	Team SABCO	Chevrolet	29.585	128.740
2	20	Tony Stewart (R)	Joe Gibbs Racing	Pontiac	29.595	128.697
3	55	Kenny Wallace	Andy Petree Racing	Chevrolet	29.599	128.680
Full Happy Hour practice results

== Qualifying ==
Qualifying was scheduled to be split into two rounds, with the first round being held on Friday, September 17, and the second round on Saturday, September 18. However, due to inclement rain from Hurricane Floyd on Friday, the first round of qualifying was cancelled, leaving only one round of qualifying run on Saturday.

Qualifying was held on Saturday, September 18, at 11:00 AM EST. Each driver would have one lap to set a time.

Rusty Wallace, driving for Penske-Kranefuss Racing, would win the pole, setting a time of 29.339 and an average speed of 129.820 miles per hour (208.925 km/h).

Four drivers would fail to qualify: Darrell Waltrip, Derrike Cope, Dick Trickle, and Andy Belmont.

=== Full qualifying results ===
Pos.	#	Driver	Team	Make	Time	Speed
1	2	Rusty Wallace	Penske-Kranefuss Racing	Ford	29.339	129.820
2	88	Dale Jarrett	Robert Yates Racing	Ford	29.477	129.213
3	33	Ken Schrader	Andy Petree Racing	Chevrolet	29.504	129.094
4	16	Kevin Lepage	Roush Racing	Ford	29.524	129.007
5	20	Tony Stewart (R)	Joe Gibbs Racing	Pontiac	29.563	128.837
6	31	Mike Skinner	Richard Childress Racing	Chevrolet	29.579	128.767
7	18	Bobby Labonte	Joe Gibbs Racing	Pontiac	29.603	128.663
8	25	Wally Dallenbach Jr.	Hendrick Motorsports	Chevrolet	29.605	128.654
9	4	Bobby Hamilton	Morgan–McClure Motorsports	Chevrolet	29.617	128.602
10	44	Kyle Petty	Petty Enterprises	Pontiac	29.622	128.580
11	42	Joe Nemechek	Team SABCO	Chevrolet	29.635	128.524
12	1	Steve Park	Dale Earnhardt, Inc.	Chevrolet	29.657	128.428
13	98	Rick Mast	Cale Yarborough Motorsports	Ford	29.661	128.411
14	60	Geoff Bodine	Joe Bessey Racing	Chevrolet	29.664	128.398
15	43	John Andretti	Petty Enterprises	Pontiac	29.702	128.234
16	3	Dale Earnhardt	Richard Childress Racing	Chevrolet	29.721	128.152
17	22	Ward Burton	Bill Davis Racing	Pontiac	29.734	128.096
18	45	David Green	Tyler Jet Motorsports	Pontiac	29.747	128.040
19	24	Jeff Gordon	Hendrick Motorsports	Chevrolet	29.755	128.005
20	7	Michael Waltrip	Mattei Motorsports	Chevrolet	29.766	127.958
21	26	Johnny Benson Jr.	Roush Racing	Ford	29.767	127.954
22	30	Todd Bodine	Bahari Racing	Pontiac	29.776	127.915
23	75	Ted Musgrave	Butch Mock Motorsports	Ford	29.784	127.881
24	14	Randy LaJoie	Irvan-Simo Racing	Ford	29.790	127.855
25	6	Mark Martin	Roush Racing	Ford	29.823	127.714
26	58	Hut Stricklin	SBIII Motorsports	Ford	29.826	127.701
27	50	Ricky Craven	Midwest Transit Racing	Chevrolet	29.832	127.675
28	12	Jeremy Mayfield	Penske-Kranefuss Racing	Ford	29.893	127.414
29	40	Sterling Marlin	Team SABCO	Chevrolet	29.927	127.270
30	36	Jerry Nadeau	MB2 Motorsports	Pontiac	29.936	127.231
31	94	Bill Elliott	Bill Elliott Racing	Ford	29.960	127.130
32	5	Terry Labonte	Hendrick Motorsports	Chevrolet	30.011	126.913
33	10	Ricky Rudd	Rudd Performance Motorsports	Ford	30.036	126.808
34	77	Robert Pressley	Jasper Motorsports	Ford	30.048	126.757
35	21	Elliott Sadler (R)	Wood Brothers Racing	Ford	30.051	126.745
36	28	Kenny Irwin Jr.	Robert Yates Racing	Ford	30.082	126.614
Provisionals
37	99	Jeff Burton	Roush Racing	Ford	30.164	126.270
38	23	Jimmy Spencer	Haas-Carter Motorsports	Ford	38.956	97.772
39	55	Kenny Wallace	Andy Petree Racing	Chevrolet	30.271	125.823
40	97	Chad Little	Roush Racing	Ford	30.308	125.670
41	9	Rich Bickle	Melling Racing	Ford	30.416	125.224
42	11	Brett Bodine	Brett Bodine Racing	Ford	30.125	126.433
43	71	Dave Marcis	Marcis Auto Racing	Chevrolet	30.332	125.570
Failed to qualify
44	66	Darrell Waltrip	Haas-Carter Motorsports	Ford	30.087	126.593
45	91	Derrike Cope	LJ Racing	Chevrolet	30.116	126.471
46	41	Dick Trickle	Larry Hedrick Motorsports	Chevrolet	30.128	126.421
47	79	Andy Belmont	T.R.I.X. Racing	Ford	-	-
Official qualifying results

== Race results ==
Fin	St	#	Driver	Team	Make	Laps	Led	Status	Pts	Winnings
1	11	42	Joe Nemechek	Team SABCO	Chevrolet	300	72	running	180	$157,625
2	5	20	Tony Stewart (R)	Joe Gibbs Racing	Pontiac	300	40	running	175	$114,790
3	7	18	Bobby Labonte	Joe Gibbs Racing	Pontiac	300	2	running	170	$94,250
4	37	99	Jeff Burton	Roush Racing	Ford	300	0	running	160	$87,450
5	19	24	Jeff Gordon	Hendrick Motorsports	Chevrolet	300	0	running	155	$88,440
6	1	2	Rusty Wallace	Penske-Kranefuss Racing	Ford	300	84	running	160	$70,825
7	21	26	Johnny Benson Jr.	Roush Racing	Ford	300	0	running	146	$59,675
8	17	22	Ward Burton	Bill Davis Racing	Pontiac	300	1	running	147	$58,000
9	13	98	Rick Mast	Cale Yarborough Motorsports	Ford	300	13	running	143	$50,825
10	36	28	Kenny Irwin Jr.	Robert Yates Racing	Ford	300	0	running	134	$62,565
11	9	4	Bobby Hamilton	Morgan–McClure Motorsports	Chevrolet	300	0	running	130	$59,225
12	3	33	Ken Schrader	Andy Petree Racing	Chevrolet	300	0	running	127	$54,625
13	16	3	Dale Earnhardt	Richard Childress Racing	Chevrolet	300	0	running	124	$55,125
14	35	21	Elliott Sadler (R)	Wood Brothers Racing	Ford	300	0	running	121	$51,225
15	12	1	Steve Park	Dale Earnhardt, Inc.	Chevrolet	300	2	running	123	$51,025
16	26	58	Hut Stricklin	SBIII Motorsports	Ford	299	0	running	115	$39,565
17	25	6	Mark Martin	Roush Racing	Ford	299	0	running	112	$55,600
18	2	88	Dale Jarrett	Robert Yates Racing	Ford	299	49	running	114	$66,500
19	31	94	Bill Elliott	Bill Elliott Racing	Ford	299	0	running	106	$47,700
20	41	9	Rich Bickle	Melling Racing	Ford	299	0	running	103	$42,940
21	29	40	Sterling Marlin	Team SABCO	Chevrolet	299	0	running	100	$47,700
22	8	25	Wally Dallenbach Jr.	Hendrick Motorsports	Chevrolet	299	0	running	97	$46,775
23	23	75	Ted Musgrave	Butch Mock Motorsports	Ford	299	0	running	94	$39,875
24	38	23	Jimmy Spencer	Haas-Carter Motorsports	Ford	299	0	running	91	$46,175
25	43	71	Dave Marcis	Marcis Auto Racing	Chevrolet	299	0	running	88	$36,175
26	4	16	Kevin Lepage	Roush Racing	Ford	299	0	running	85	$46,275
27	6	31	Mike Skinner	Richard Childress Racing	Chevrolet	298	0	running	82	$45,350
28	40	97	Chad Little	Roush Racing	Ford	298	0	running	79	$45,075
29	42	11	Brett Bodine	Brett Bodine Racing	Ford	298	0	running	76	$44,875
30	34	77	Robert Pressley	Jasper Motorsports	Ford	298	0	running	73	$37,400
31	32	5	Terry Labonte	Hendrick Motorsports	Chevrolet	297	37	crash	75	$59,475
32	30	36	Jerry Nadeau	MB2 Motorsports	Pontiac	297	0	running	67	$41,275
33	10	44	Kyle Petty	Petty Enterprises	Pontiac	292	0	running	64	$34,075
34	39	55	Kenny Wallace	Andy Petree Racing	Chevrolet	289	0	running	61	$33,850
35	14	60	Geoff Bodine	Joe Bessey Racing	Chevrolet	285	0	running	58	$33,650
36	28	12	Jeremy Mayfield	Penske-Kranefuss Racing	Ford	284	0	running	55	$48,450
37	24	14	Randy LaJoie	Irvan-Simo Racing	Ford	284	0	running	52	$33,250
38	20	7	Michael Waltrip	Mattei Motorsports	Chevrolet	219	0	crash	49	$39,900
39	22	30	Todd Bodine	Bahari Racing	Pontiac	169	0	crash	46	$32,875
40	18	45	David Green	Tyler Jet Motorsports	Pontiac	126	0	crash	43	$32,825
41	15	43	John Andretti	Petty Enterprises	Pontiac	125	0	crash	40	$47,800
42	33	10	Ricky Rudd	Rudd Performance Motorsports	Ford	125	0	crash	37	$39,775
43	27	50	Ricky Craven	Midwest Transit Racing	Chevrolet	111	0	crash	34	$32,950
Failed to qualify
44		66	Darrell Waltrip	Haas-Carter Motorsports	Ford					
45		91	Derrike Cope	LJ Racing	Chevrolet					
46		41	Dick Trickle	Larry Hedrick Motorsports	Chevrolet					
47		79	Andy Belmont	T.R.I.X. Racing	Ford					
Official race results

Previous race: 1999 Exide NASCAR Select Batteries 400	NASCAR Winston Cup Series; 1999 season	Next race: 1999 MBNA Gold 400
