= 1999 MBNA Gold 400 =

27th race of the 1999 NASCAR Winston Cup Series

Race details
- Race 27 of 34 in the 1999 NASCAR Winston Cup Series
- The 1999 MBNA Gold 400 program cover.
- Date: September 21, 1999
- Official name: 31st Annual MBNA Gold 400
- Location: Dover, Delaware, Dover International Speedway
- Course: Permanent racing facility
- Course length: 1 miles (1.6 km)
- Distance: 400 laps, 400 mi (643.737 km)
- Average speed: 127.434 miles per hour (205.085 km/h)

Pole position
Driver	Rusty Wallace	Penske-Kranefuss Racing
- Time: 22.505

Most laps led
Driver	Mark Martin	Roush Racing
- Laps: 161

Winner
No. 6	Mark Martin	Roush Racing

Television in the United States
- Network: TNN
- Announcers: Eli Gold, Dick Berggren, Buddy Baker

Radio in the United States
- Radio: Motor Racing Network

The 1999 MBNA Gold 400 was the 27th stock car race of the 1999 NASCAR Winston Cup Series season and the 31st iteration of the event. The race was held on Sunday, September 26, 1999, in Dover, Delaware at Dover International Speedway, a 1-mile (1.6 km) permanent oval-shaped racetrack. The race took the scheduled 400 laps to complete. Roush Racing driver Mark Martin would manage to dominate the late stages of the race from lap 349 to take his 31st career NASCAR Winston Cup Series victory and his second and final victory of the season. To fill out the podium, Joe Gibbs Racing driver Tony Stewart and Robert Yates Racing driver Dale Jarrett would finish second and third, respectively.

== Background ==
The layout of Dover International Speedway, the venue where the race was held.

Dover International Speedway is an oval race track in Dover, Delaware. The track features one layout, a 1-mile (1.6 km) concrete oval, with 24° banking in the turns and 9° banking on the straights. The speedway is owned and operated by Speedway Motorsports.

=== Entry list ===
- (R) denotes rookie driver.

#	Driver	Team	Make
1	Steve Park	Dale Earnhardt, Inc.	Chevrolet
2	Rusty Wallace	Penske-Kranefuss Racing	Ford
3	Dale Earnhardt	Richard Childress Racing	Chevrolet
4	Bobby Hamilton	Morgan–McClure Motorsports	Chevrolet
5	Terry Labonte	Hendrick Motorsports	Chevrolet
6	Mark Martin	Roush Racing	Ford
7	Michael Waltrip	Mattei Motorsports	Chevrolet
9	Rich Bickle	Melling Racing	Ford
10	Ricky Rudd	Rudd Performance Motorsports	Ford
11	Brett Bodine	Brett Bodine Racing	Ford
12	Jeremy Mayfield	Penske-Kranefuss Racing	Ford
16	Kevin Lepage	Roush Racing	Ford
17	Matt Kenseth	Roush Racing	Ford
18	Bobby Labonte	Joe Gibbs Racing	Pontiac
20	Tony Stewart (R)	Joe Gibbs Racing	Pontiac
21	Elliott Sadler (R)	Wood Brothers Racing	Ford
22	Ward Burton	Bill Davis Racing	Pontiac
23	Jimmy Spencer	Haas-Carter Motorsports	Ford
24	Jeff Gordon	Hendrick Motorsports	Chevrolet
25	Wally Dallenbach Jr.	Hendrick Motorsports	Chevrolet
26	Johnny Benson Jr.	Roush Racing	Ford
28	Kenny Irwin Jr.	Robert Yates Racing	Ford
30	Todd Bodine	Bahari Racing	Pontiac
31	Mike Skinner	Richard Childress Racing	Chevrolet
33	Ken Schrader	Andy Petree Racing	Chevrolet
36	Jerry Nadeau	MB2 Motorsports	Pontiac
40	Sterling Marlin	Team SABCO	Chevrolet
41	Dick Trickle	Larry Hedrick Motorsports	Chevrolet
42	Joe Nemechek	Team SABCO	Chevrolet
43	John Andretti	Petty Enterprises	Pontiac
44	Kyle Petty	Petty Enterprises	Pontiac
45	David Green	Tyler Jet Motorsports	Pontiac
50	Ricky Craven	Midwest Transit Racing	Chevrolet
55	Kenny Wallace	Andy Petree Racing	Chevrolet
58	Hut Stricklin	SBIII Motorsports	Ford
60	Geoff Bodine	Joe Bessey Racing	Chevrolet
66	Darrell Waltrip	Haas-Carter Motorsports	Ford
71	Dave Marcis	Marcis Auto Racing	Chevrolet
75	Ted Musgrave	Butch Mock Motorsports	Ford
77	Robert Pressley	Jasper Motorsports	Ford
79	Andy Belmont	T.R.I.X. Racing	Ford
88	Dale Jarrett	Robert Yates Racing	Ford
90	Ed Berrier	Donlavey Racing	Ford
91	Derrike Cope	LJ Racing	Chevrolet
94	Bill Elliott	Bill Elliott Racing	Ford
97	Chad Little	Roush Racing	Ford
98	Rick Mast	Cale Yarborough Motorsports	Ford
99	Jeff Burton	Roush Racing	Ford
Official entry list

== Practice ==
=== First practice ===
The first practice session was held on Friday, September 24, at 11:00 a.m. EST. The session would last for one hour and 30 minutes. Steve Park, driving for Dale Earnhardt, Inc., would set the fastest time in the session, with a lap of 22.592 and an average speed of 159.348 mph (256.446 km/h).

Pos.	#	Driver	Team	Make	Time	Speed
1	1	Steve Park	Dale Earnhardt, Inc.	Chevrolet	22.592	159.348
2	20	Tony Stewart (R)	Joe Gibbs Racing	Pontiac	22.601	159.284
3	2	Rusty Wallace	Penske-Kranefuss Racing	Ford	22.683	158.709
Full first practice results

=== Second practice ===
The second practice session was held on Friday, September 24, at 1:20 p.m. EST. The session would last for 40 minutes. Jeremy Mayfield, driving for Penske-Kranefuss Racing, would set the fastest time in the session, with a lap of 22.523 and an average speed of 159.836 mph (257.231 km/h).

Pos.	#	Driver	Team	Make	Time	Speed
1	12	Jeremy Mayfield	Penske-Kranefuss Racing	Ford	22.523	159.836
2	1	Steve Park	Dale Earnhardt, Inc.	Chevrolet	22.616	159.179
3	2	Rusty Wallace	Penske-Kranefuss Racing	Ford	22.622	159.137
Full second practice results

=== Third practice ===
The third practice session was held on Saturday, September 25, at 9:30 a.m. EST. The session would last for one hour and 15 minutes. Todd Bodine, driving for Bahari Racing, would set the fastest time in the session, with a lap of 22.958 and an average speed of 156.808 mph (252.358 km/h).

Pos.	#	Driver	Team	Make	Time	Speed
1	30	Todd Bodine	Bahari Racing	Pontiac	22.958	156.808
2	55	Kenny Wallace	Andy Petree Racing	Chevrolet	23.020	156.385
3	20	Tony Stewart (R)	Joe Gibbs Racing	Pontiac	23.062	156.100
Full third practice results

=== Final practice ===
The final practice session, sometimes referred to as Happy Hour, was held on Saturday, July 24, after the preliminary 1999 MBNA Gold 200. The session would last for one hour. Jeremy Mayfield, driving for Penske-Kranefuss Racing, would set the fastest time in the session, with a lap of 23.257 and an average speed of 154.792 mph (249.114 km/h).

Pos.	#	Driver	Team	Make	Time	Speed
1	12	Jeremy Mayfield	Penske-Kranefuss Racing	Ford	23.257	154.792
2	6	Mark Martin	Roush Racing	Ford	23.337	154.261
3	21	Elliott Sadler (R)	Wood Brothers Racing	Ford	23.348	154.188
Full Happy Hour practice results

== Qualifying ==
Qualifying was split into two rounds. The first round was held on Friday, September 24, at 3:30 p.m. EST. Each driver would have one lap to set a time. During the first round, the top 25 drivers in the round would be guaranteed a starting spot in the race. If a driver was not able to guarantee a spot in the first round, they had the option to scrub their time from the first round and try and run a faster lap time in a second round qualifying run, held on Saturday, September 25, at 11:30 a.m. EST. As with the first round, each driver would have one lap to set a time. Positions 26-36 would be decided on time, while positions 37-43 would be based on provisionals. Six spots are awarded by the use of provisionals based on owner's points. The seventh is awarded to a past champion who has not otherwise qualified for the race. If no past champion needs the provisional, the next team in the owner points will be awarded a provisional.

Rusty Wallace, driving for Penske-Kranefuss Racing, would win the pole, setting a time of 22.505 and an average speed of 159.964 miles per hour (257.437 km/h).

Five drivers would fail to qualify: Dick Trickle, Todd Bodine, Darrell Waltrip, Derrike Cope, and Andy Belmont.

=== Full qualifying results ===
Pos.	#	Driver	Team	Make	Time	Speed
1	2	Rusty Wallace	Penske-Kranefuss Racing	Ford	22.505	159.964
2	36	Jerry Nadeau	MB2 Motorsports	Pontiac	22.517	159.879
3	20	Tony Stewart (R)	Joe Gibbs Racing	Pontiac	22.552	159.631
4	12	Jeremy Mayfield	Penske-Kranefuss Racing	Ford	21.584	159.405
5	60	Geoff Bodine	Joe Bessey Racing	Chevrolet	21.664	158.842
6	94	Bill Elliott	Bill Elliott Racing	Ford	22.665	158.835
7	24	Jeff Gordon	Hendrick Motorsports	Chevrolet	22.692	158.646
8	6	Mark Martin	Roush Racing	Ford	22.693	158.639
9	43	John Andretti	Petty Enterprises	Pontiac	22.702	158.576
10	1	Steve Park	Dale Earnhardt, Inc.	Chevrolet	22.703	158.569
11	31	Mike Skinner	Richard Childress Racing	Chevrolet	22.704	158.562
12	28	Kenny Irwin Jr.	Robert Yates Racing	Ford	22.709	158.527
13	17	Matt Kenseth	Roush Racing	Ford	22.723	158.430
14	10	Ricky Rudd	Rudd Performance Motorsports	Ford	22.732	158.367
15	42	Joe Nemechek	Team SABCO	Chevrolet	22.779	158.040
16	21	Elliott Sadler (R)	Wood Brothers Racing	Ford	22.784	158.006
17	22	Ward Burton	Bill Davis Racing	Pontiac	22.787	157.985
18	23	Jimmy Spencer	Haas-Carter Motorsports	Ford	22.791	157.957
19	98	Rick Mast	Cale Yarborough Motorsports	Ford	22.801	157.888
20	18	Bobby Labonte	Joe Gibbs Racing	Pontiac	22.806	157.853
21	16	Kevin Lepage	Roush Racing	Ford	22.818	157.770
22	97	Chad Little	Roush Racing	Ford	22.823	157.736
23	90	Ed Berrier	Donlavey Racing	Ford	22.827	157.708
24	26	Johnny Benson Jr.	Roush Racing	Ford	22.862	157.467
25	33	Ken Schrader	Andy Petree Racing	Chevrolet	22.864	157.453
26	88	Dale Jarrett	Robert Yates Racing	Ford	22.650	158.940
27	50	Ricky Craven	Midwest Transit Racing	Chevrolet	22.870	157.411
28	99	Jeff Burton	Roush Racing	Ford	22.924	157.041
29	44	Kyle Petty	Petty Enterprises	Pontiac	22.928	157.013
30	40	Sterling Marlin	Team SABCO	Chevrolet	22.943	156.911
31	4	Bobby Hamilton	Morgan–McClure Motorsports	Chevrolet	22.945	156.897
32	77	Robert Pressley	Jasper Motorsports	Ford	22.963	156.774
33	11	Brett Bodine	Brett Bodine Racing	Ford	22.965	156.760
34	55	Kenny Wallace	Andy Petree Racing	Chevrolet	22.978	156.672
35	7	Michael Waltrip	Mattei Motorsports	Chevrolet	23.014	156.427
36	45	David Green	Tyler Jet Motorsports	Pontiac	23.014	156.427
Provisionals
37	3	Dale Earnhardt	Richard Childress Racing	Chevrolet	-*	-*
38	5	Terry Labonte	Hendrick Motorsports	Chevrolet	-*	-*
39	25	Wally Dallenbach Jr.	Hendrick Motorsports	Chevrolet	-*	-*
40	75	Ted Musgrave	Butch Mock Motorsports	Ford	-*	-*
41	9	Rich Bickle	Melling Racing	Ford	-*	-*
42	58	Hut Stricklin	SBIII Motorsports	Ford	-*	-*
43	71	Dave Marcis	Marcis Auto Racing	Chevrolet	-*	-*
Failed to qualify
44	41	Dick Trickle	Larry Hedrick Motorsports	Chevrolet	23.228	154.985
45	30	Todd Bodine	Bahari Racing	Pontiac	23.228	154.985
46	66	Darrell Waltrip	Haas-Carter Motorsports	Ford	23.429	153.656
47	91	Derrike Cope	LJ Racing	Chevrolet	23.554	152.840
48	79	Andy Belmont	T.R.I.X. Racing	Ford	23.807	151.216
Official first round qualifying results
Official starting lineup

== Race results ==
Fin	St	#	Driver	Team	Make	Laps	Led	Status	Pts	Winnings
1	8	6	Mark Martin	Roush Racing	Ford	400	161	running	185	$115,710
2	3	20	Tony Stewart (R)	Joe Gibbs Racing	Pontiac	400	97	running	175	$88,875
3	26	88	Dale Jarrett	Robert Yates Racing	Ford	400	99	running	170	$74,935
4	13	17	Matt Kenseth	Roush Racing	Ford	400	0	running	160	$51,160
5	20	18	Bobby Labonte	Joe Gibbs Racing	Pontiac	400	2	running	160	$56,285
6	28	99	Jeff Burton	Roush Racing	Ford	400	1	running	155	$55,815
7	22	97	Chad Little	Roush Racing	Ford	399	0	running	146	$47,990
8	37	3	Dale Earnhardt	Richard Childress Racing	Chevrolet	399	0	running	142	$52,065
9	10	1	Steve Park	Dale Earnhardt, Inc.	Chevrolet	399	0	running	138	$42,915
10	12	28	Kenny Irwin Jr.	Robert Yates Racing	Ford	399	1	running	139	$50,905
11	17	22	Ward Burton	Bill Davis Racing	Pontiac	399	0	running	130	$46,765
12	16	21	Elliott Sadler (R)	Wood Brothers Racing	Ford	398	0	running	127	$44,865
13	21	16	Kevin Lepage	Roush Racing	Ford	398	0	running	124	$40,065
14	18	23	Jimmy Spencer	Haas-Carter Motorsports	Ford	398	0	running	121	$42,070
15	39	25	Wally Dallenbach Jr.	Hendrick Motorsports	Chevrolet	397	0	running	118	$40,800
16	2	36	Jerry Nadeau	MB2 Motorsports	Pontiac	397	0	running	115	$39,050
17	7	24	Jeff Gordon	Hendrick Motorsports	Chevrolet	397	14	running	117	$49,940
18	24	26	Johnny Benson Jr.	Roush Racing	Ford	397	0	running	109	$39,090
19	35	7	Michael Waltrip	Mattei Motorsports	Chevrolet	397	0	running	106	$40,995
20	29	44	Kyle Petty	Petty Enterprises	Pontiac	396	0	running	103	$33,035
21	11	31	Mike Skinner	Richard Childress Racing	Chevrolet	396	0	running	100	$39,840
22	4	12	Jeremy Mayfield	Penske-Kranefuss Racing	Ford	396	1	running	102	$42,315
23	32	77	Robert Pressley	Jasper Motorsports	Ford	395	0	running	94	$30,555
24	5	60	Geoff Bodine	Joe Bessey Racing	Chevrolet	395	0	running	91	$30,695
25	42	58	Hut Stricklin	SBIII Motorsports	Ford	393	0	running	88	$27,410
26	25	33	Ken Schrader	Andy Petree Racing	Chevrolet	393	0	running	85	$37,750
27	38	5	Terry Labonte	Hendrick Motorsports	Chevrolet	393	2	running	87	$41,990
28	40	75	Ted Musgrave	Butch Mock Motorsports	Ford	392	0	running	79	$29,930
29	33	11	Brett Bodine	Brett Bodine Racing	Ford	390	0	running	76	$36,870
30	31	4	Bobby Hamilton	Morgan–McClure Motorsports	Chevrolet	389	0	running	73	$46,235
31	23	90	Ed Berrier	Donlavey Racing	Ford	386	0	running	70	$26,725
32	1	2	Rusty Wallace	Penske-Kranefuss Racing	Ford	385	22	running	72	$49,655
33	6	94	Bill Elliott	Bill Elliott Racing	Ford	382	0	running	64	$36,095
34	19	98	Rick Mast	Cale Yarborough Motorsports	Ford	367	0	running	61	$26,535
35	15	42	Joe Nemechek	Team SABCO	Chevrolet	363	0	running	58	$33,475
36	41	9	Rich Bickle	Melling Racing	Ford	355	0	running	55	$26,435
37	14	10	Ricky Rudd	Rudd Performance Motorsports	Ford	352	0	oil leak	52	$33,400
38	30	40	Sterling Marlin	Team SABCO	Chevrolet	344	0	running	49	$34,365
39	43	71	Dave Marcis	Marcis Auto Racing	Chevrolet	226	0	running	46	$26,330
40	27	50	Ricky Craven	Midwest Transit Racing	Chevrolet	162	0	transmission	43	$26,295
41	9	43	John Andretti	Petty Enterprises	Pontiac	151	0	crash	40	$44,860
42	36	45	David Green	Tyler Jet Motorsports	Pontiac	136	0	engine	37	$26,225
43	34	55	Kenny Wallace	Andy Petree Racing	Chevrolet	63	0	engine	34	$26,890
Failed to qualify
44		41	Dick Trickle	Larry Hedrick Motorsports	Chevrolet					
45		30	Todd Bodine	Bahari Racing	Pontiac					
46		66	Darrell Waltrip	Haas-Carter Motorsports	Ford					
47		91	Derrike Cope	LJ Racing	Chevrolet					
48		79	Andy Belmont	T.R.I.X. Racing	Ford					
Official race results

Previous race: 1999 Dura Lube/Kmart 300	NASCAR Winston Cup Series; 1999 season	Next race: 1999 NAPA Autocare 500
