= 1999 NAPA Autocare 500 =

28th race of the 1999 NASCAR Winston Cup Series

Race details
- Race 28 of 34 in the 1999 NASCAR Winston Cup Series
- The 1999 NAPA Autocare 500 program cover.
- Date: October 3, 1999
- Location: Ridgeway, Virginia, Martinsville Speedway
- Course: Permanent racing facility
- Course length: 0.526 miles (0.847 km)
- Distance: 500 laps, 263 mi (423.257 km)
- Average speed: 72.347 miles per hour (116.431 km/h)

Pole position
Driver	Joe Nemechek	Team SABCO
- Time: 19.886

Most laps led
Driver	Mike Skinner	Richard Childress Racing
- Laps: 138

Winner
No. 24	Jeff Gordon	Hendrick Motorsports

Television in the United States
- Network: ESPN
- Announcers: Bob Jenkins, Ned Jarrett, Benny Parsons

Radio in the United States
- Radio: Motor Racing Network

The 1999 NAPA Autocare 500 was the 28th stock car race of the 1999 NASCAR Winston Cup Series season and the 51st iteration of the event. The race was held on Sunday, October 3, 1999, before an audience of 62,000 in Martinsville, Virginia at Martinsville Speedway, a 0.526 miles (0.847 km) permanent oval-shaped short track. The race took the scheduled 500 laps to complete. Within the final laps of the race, Hendrick Motorsports driver Jeff Gordon was able to hold off the field on the final restart with 19 to go to take his 48th career NASCAR Winston Cup Series victory, his sixth victory of the season and it marked Gordon's first race & win without Ray Evernham as his crew chief. To fill out the top three, Richard Childress Racing driver Dale Earnhardt and Joe Bessey Racing driver Geoff Bodine would finish second and third, respectively.

== Background ==
The layout of Martinsville Speedway, the venue where the race was held.

Martinsville Speedway is a NASCAR-owned stock car racing track located in Henry County, in Ridgeway, Virginia, just to the south of Martinsville. At 0.526 miles (0.847 km) in length, it is the shortest track in the NASCAR Cup Series. The track was also one of the first paved oval tracks in NASCAR, being built in 1947 by H. Clay Earles. It is also the only remaining race track that has been on the NASCAR circuit from its beginning in 1948.

=== Entry list ===
- (R) denotes rookie driver.

#	Driver	Team	Make
1	Steve Park	Dale Earnhardt, Inc.	Chevrolet
01	Ron Hornaday Jr.	Team SABCO	Chevrolet
2	Rusty Wallace	Penske-Kranefuss Racing	Ford
3	Dale Earnhardt	Richard Childress Racing	Chevrolet
4	Bobby Hamilton	Morgan–McClure Motorsports	Chevrolet
5	Terry Labonte	Hendrick Motorsports	Chevrolet
05	Morgan Shepherd	Shepherd Racing Ventures	Pontiac
6	Mark Martin	Roush Racing	Ford
7	Michael Waltrip	Mattei Motorsports	Chevrolet
9	Rich Bickle	Melling Racing	Ford
10	Ricky Rudd	Rudd Performance Motorsports	Ford
11	Brett Bodine	Brett Bodine Racing	Ford
12	Jeremy Mayfield	Penske-Kranefuss Racing	Ford
16	Kevin Lepage	Roush Racing	Ford
18	Bobby Labonte	Joe Gibbs Racing	Pontiac
20	Tony Stewart (R)	Joe Gibbs Racing	Pontiac
21	Elliott Sadler (R)	Wood Brothers Racing	Ford
22	Ward Burton	Bill Davis Racing	Pontiac
23	Jimmy Spencer	Haas-Carter Motorsports	Ford
24	Jeff Gordon	Hendrick Motorsports	Chevrolet
25	Wally Dallenbach Jr.	Hendrick Motorsports	Chevrolet
26	Johnny Benson Jr.	Roush Racing	Ford
28	Kenny Irwin Jr.	Robert Yates Racing	Ford
30	Mike Bliss	Bahari Racing	Pontiac
31	Mike Skinner	Richard Childress Racing	Chevrolet
33	Ken Schrader	Andy Petree Racing	Chevrolet
36	Jerry Nadeau	MB2 Motorsports	Pontiac
40	Sterling Marlin	Team SABCO	Chevrolet
41	Dick Trickle	Larry Hedrick Motorsports	Chevrolet
42	Joe Nemechek	Team SABCO	Chevrolet
43	John Andretti	Petty Enterprises	Pontiac
44	Kyle Petty	Petty Enterprises	Pontiac
45	David Green	Tyler Jet Motorsports	Pontiac
50	Ricky Craven	Midwest Transit Racing	Chevrolet
55	Kenny Wallace	Andy Petree Racing	Chevrolet
58	Hut Stricklin	SBIII Motorsports	Ford
60	Geoff Bodine	Joe Bessey Racing	Chevrolet
66	Darrell Waltrip	Haas-Carter Motorsports	Ford
71	Dave Marcis	Marcis Auto Racing	Chevrolet
75	Ted Musgrave	Butch Mock Motorsports	Ford
77	Robert Pressley	Jasper Motorsports	Ford
88	Dale Jarrett	Robert Yates Racing	Ford
91	Tim Fedewa	LJ Racing	Chevrolet
94	Bill Elliott	Bill Elliott Racing	Ford
97	Chad Little	Roush Racing	Ford
98	Rick Mast	Cale Yarborough Motorsports	Ford
99	Jeff Burton	Roush Racing	Ford
Official entry list

== Practice ==
=== First practice ===
The first practice session was held on Friday, October 1, at 11:00 AM EST. The session would last for two hours and 30 minutes. Joe Nemechek, driving for Team SABCO, would set the fastest time in the session, with a lap of 19.924 and an average speed of 95.041 mph (152.954 km/h).

Pos.	#	Driver	Team	Make	Time	Speed
1	42	Joe Nemechek	Team SABCO	Chevrolet	19.924	95.041
2	10	Ricky Rudd	Rudd Performance Motorsports	Ford	19.944	94.945
3	55	Kenny Wallace	Andy Petree Racing	Chevrolet	19.967	94.836
Full first practice results

=== Second practice ===
The second practice session was held on Saturday, October 2, at 9:40 AM EST. The session would last for 50 minutes. Kenny Wallace, driving for Andy Petree Racing, would set the fastest time in the session, with a lap of 20.150 and an average speed of 93.975 mph (151.238 km/h).

Pos.	#	Driver	Team	Make	Time	Speed
1	55	Kenny Wallace	Andy Petree Racing	Chevrolet	20.150	93.975
2	20	Tony Stewart (R)	Joe Gibbs Racing	Pontiac	20.154	93.956
3	6	Mark Martin	Roush Racing	Ford	20.194	93.770
Full second practice results

=== Final practice ===
The final practice session, was held on Saturday, October 2. The session would last for one hour. Mark Martin, driving for Roush Racing, would set the fastest time in the session, with a lap of 20.399 and an average speed of 92.828 mph (149.392 km/h).

Pos.	#	Driver	Team	Make	Time	Speed
1	6	Mark Martin	Roush Racing	Ford	20.399	92.828
2	44	Kyle Petty	Petty Enterprises	Pontiac	20.416	92.750
3	33	Ken Schrader	Andy Petree Racing	Chevrolet	20.446	92.614
Full Happy Hour practice results

== Qualifying ==
Qualifying was split into two rounds. The first round was held on Friday, October 1, at 3:00 PM EST. Each driver would have two laps to set a fastest time; the fastest of the two would count as their official qualifying lap. During the first round, the top 25 drivers in the round would be guaranteed a starting spot in the race. If a driver was not able to guarantee a spot in the first round, they had the option to scrub their time from the first round and try and run a faster lap time in a second round qualifying run, held on Saturday, October 2, at 11:15 PM EST. As with the first round, each driver would have two laps to set a fastest time; the fastest of the two would count as their official qualifying lap. Positions 26-36 would be decided on time, while positions 37-43 would be based on provisionals. Six spots are awarded by the use of provisionals based on owner's points. The seventh is awarded to a past champion who has not otherwise qualified for the race. If no past champion needs the provisional, the next team in the owner points will be awarded a provisional.

Joe Nemechek, driving for Team SABCO, would win the pole, setting a time of 19.886 and an average speed of 95.223 miles per hour (153.247 km/h).

Four drivers would fail to qualify: Ron Hornaday Jr., Dick Trickle, Tim Fedewa, and Morgan Shepherd.

=== Full qualifying results ===
Pos.	#	Driver	Team	Make	Time	Speed
1	42	Joe Nemechek	Team SABCO	Chevrolet	19.886	95.223
2	75	Ted Musgrave	Butch Mock Motorsports	Ford	19.918	95.070
3	60	Geoff Bodine	Joe Bessey Racing	Chevrolet	19.967	94.836
4	44	Kyle Petty	Petty Enterprises	Pontiac	19.976	94.794
5	24	Jeff Gordon	Hendrick Motorsports	Chevrolet	19.983	94.761
6	6	Mark Martin	Roush Racing	Ford	19.993	94.713
7	55	Kenny Wallace	Andy Petree Racing	Chevrolet	20.003	94.666
8	10	Ricky Rudd	Rudd Performance Motorsports	Ford	20.004	94.661
9	43	John Andretti	Petty Enterprises	Pontiac	20.007	94.647
10	9	Rich Bickle	Melling Racing	Ford	20.010	94.633
11	22	Ward Burton	Bill Davis Racing	Pontiac	20.020	94.585
12	98	Rick Mast	Cale Yarborough Motorsports	Ford	20.043	94.477
13	99	Jeff Burton	Roush Racing	Ford	20.054	94.425
14	88	Dale Jarrett	Robert Yates Racing	Ford	20.062	94.387
15	77	Robert Pressley	Jasper Motorsports	Ford	20.067	94.364
16	31	Mike Skinner	Richard Childress Racing	Chevrolet	20.074	94.331
17	12	Jeremy Mayfield	Penske-Kranefuss Racing	Ford	20.083	94.289
18	7	Michael Waltrip	Mattei Motorsports	Chevrolet	20.098	94.218
19	30	Mike Bliss	Bahari Racing	Pontiac	20.098	94.218
20	2	Rusty Wallace	Penske-Kranefuss Racing	Ford	20.103	94.195
21	33	Ken Schrader	Andy Petree Racing	Chevrolet	20.107	94.176
22	66	Darrell Waltrip	Haas-Carter Motorsports	Ford	20.114	94.143
23	25	Wally Dallenbach Jr.	Hendrick Motorsports	Chevrolet	20.118	94.125
24	5	Terry Labonte	Hendrick Motorsports	Chevrolet	20.123	94.101
25	18	Bobby Labonte	Joe Gibbs Racing	Pontiac	20.128	94.078
26	1	Steve Park	Dale Earnhardt, Inc.	Chevrolet	20.129	94.073
27	28	Kenny Irwin Jr.	Robert Yates Racing	Ford	20.134	94.050
28	11	Brett Bodine	Brett Bodine Racing	Ford	20.154	93.957
29	40	Sterling Marlin	Team SABCO	Chevrolet	20.163	93.915
30	4	Bobby Hamilton	Morgan–McClure Motorsports	Chevrolet	20.182	93.826
31	23	Jimmy Spencer	Haas-Carter Motorsports	Ford	20.187	93.803
32	45	David Green	Tyler Jet Motorsports	Pontiac	20.188	93.798
33	94	Bill Elliott	Bill Elliott Racing	Ford	20.197	93.756
34	50	Ricky Craven	Midwest Transit Racing	Chevrolet	20.208	93.705
35	58	Hut Stricklin	SBIII Motorsports	Ford	20.236	93.576
36	16	Kevin Lepage	Roush Racing	Ford	20.240	93.557
Provisionals
37	20	Tony Stewart (R)	Joe Gibbs Racing	Pontiac	-*	-*
38	3	Dale Earnhardt	Richard Childress Racing	Chevrolet	-*	-*
39	97	Chad Little	Roush Racing	Ford	-*	-*
40	26	Johnny Benson Jr.	Roush Racing	Ford	-*	-*
41	21	Elliott Sadler (R)	Wood Brothers Racing	Ford	-*	-*
42	36	Jerry Nadeau	MB2 Motorsports	Pontiac	-*	-*
43	71	Dave Marcis	Marcis Auto Racing	Chevrolet	-*	-*
Failed to qualify
44	01	Ron Hornaday Jr.	Team SABCO	Chevrolet	20.382	92.906
45	41	Dick Trickle	Larry Hedrick Motorsports	Chevrolet	20.384	92.896
46	91	Tim Fedewa	LJ Racing	Chevrolet	20.408	92.787
47	05	Morgan Shepherd	Shepherd Racing Ventures	Pontiac	20.493	92.402
Official first round qualifying results
Official starting lineup

== Race results ==
Fin	St	#	Driver	Team	Make	Laps	Led	Status	Pts	Winnings
1	5	24	Jeff Gordon	Hendrick Motorsports	Chevrolet	500	29	running	180	$110,090
2	38	3	Dale Earnhardt	Richard Childress Racing	Chevrolet	500	45	running	175	$70,225
3	3	60	Geoff Bodine	Joe Bessey Racing	Chevrolet	500	2	running	170	$50,475
4	20	2	Rusty Wallace	Penske-Kranefuss Racing	Ford	500	0	running	160	$53,325
5	7	55	Kenny Wallace	Andy Petree Racing	Chevrolet	500	56	running	160	$51,715
6	16	31	Mike Skinner	Richard Childress Racing	Chevrolet	500	138	running	160	$60,075
7	4	44	Kyle Petty	Petty Enterprises	Pontiac	500	5	running	151	$37,825
8	25	18	Bobby Labonte	Joe Gibbs Racing	Pontiac	500	120	running	147	$50,225
9	13	99	Jeff Burton	Roush Racing	Ford	499	0	running	138	$44,250
10	14	88	Dale Jarrett	Robert Yates Racing	Ford	499	0	running	134	$52,790
11	29	40	Sterling Marlin	Team SABCO	Chevrolet	499	22	running	135	$37,935
12	26	1	Steve Park	Dale Earnhardt, Inc.	Chevrolet	499	0	running	127	$36,100
13	11	22	Ward Burton	Bill Davis Racing	Pontiac	498	0	running	124	$36,375
14	35	58	Hut Stricklin	SBIII Motorsports	Ford	498	0	running	121	$27,950
15	17	12	Jeremy Mayfield	Penske-Kranefuss Racing	Ford	497	0	running	118	$39,650
16	6	6	Mark Martin	Roush Racing	Ford	497	0	running	115	$42,650
17	31	23	Jimmy Spencer	Haas-Carter Motorsports	Ford	497	0	running	112	$36,090
18	8	10	Ricky Rudd	Rudd Performance Motorsports	Ford	497	0	running	109	$34,155
19	2	75	Ted Musgrave	Butch Mock Motorsports	Ford	496	3	running	111	$33,100
20	33	94	Bill Elliott	Bill Elliott Racing	Ford	496	0	running	103	$34,865
21	21	33	Ken Schrader	Andy Petree Racing	Chevrolet	496	0	running	100	$34,400
22	23	25	Wally Dallenbach Jr.	Hendrick Motorsports	Chevrolet	495	0	running	97	$32,550
23	22	66	Darrell Waltrip	Haas-Carter Motorsports	Ford	495	0	running	94	$25,300
24	34	50	Ricky Craven	Midwest Transit Racing	Chevrolet	495	0	running	91	$22,250
25	41	21	Elliott Sadler (R)	Wood Brothers Racing	Ford	494	0	running	88	$33,200
26	42	36	Jerry Nadeau	MB2 Motorsports	Pontiac	493	0	running	85	$31,650
27	36	16	Kevin Lepage	Roush Racing	Ford	493	0	running	82	$31,800
28	40	26	Johnny Benson Jr.	Roush Racing	Ford	492	0	running	79	$31,550
29	12	98	Rick Mast	Cale Yarborough Motorsports	Ford	491	0	running	76	$23,600
30	30	4	Bobby Hamilton	Morgan–McClure Motorsports	Chevrolet	491	0	running	73	$36,175
31	39	97	Chad Little	Roush Racing	Ford	490	0	running	70	$27,800
32	19	30	Mike Bliss	Bahari Racing	Pontiac	488	0	running	67	$20,675
33	18	7	Michael Waltrip	Mattei Motorsports	Chevrolet	460	0	clutch	64	$27,550
34	43	71	Dave Marcis	Marcis Auto Racing	Chevrolet	454	0	running	61	$20,425
35	15	77	Robert Pressley	Jasper Motorsports	Ford	451	0	running	58	$20,300
36	32	45	David Green	Tyler Jet Motorsports	Pontiac	451	0	running	55	$20,225
37	10	9	Rich Bickle	Melling Racing	Ford	446	0	running	52	$20,600
38	1	42	Joe Nemechek	Team SABCO	Chevrolet	443	76	running	54	$33,975
39	27	28	Kenny Irwin Jr.	Robert Yates Racing	Ford	434	0	running	46	$26,850
40	24	5	Terry Labonte	Hendrick Motorsports	Chevrolet	408	0	running	43	$34,725
41	37	20	Tony Stewart (R)	Joe Gibbs Racing	Pontiac	392	0	running	40	$34,600
42	28	11	Brett Bodine	Brett Bodine Racing	Ford	386	0	running	37	$26,675
43	9	43	John Andretti	Petty Enterprises	Pontiac	291	4	crash	39	$37,950
Official race results

Previous race: 1999 MBNA Gold 400	NASCAR Winston Cup Series; 1999 season	Next race: 1999 UAW-GM Quality 500
