= Midwest Transit Racing =

Former NASCAR team

- Owner(s): Hal Hicks; Mike Witter
- Base: Daytona Beach, Florida; Mooresville, North Carolina
- Series: Winston Cup Series
- Race drivers: Rich Bickle, Ricky Craven, Ron Hornaday Jr., Rick Mast, Dan Pardus, Billy Standridge
- Manufacturer: Chevrolet
- Opened: 1998
- Closed: 2001

Career
- Debut: 1998 Pepsi 400 (Daytona)
- Latest race: 2001 Brickyard 400 (Indianapolis)
- Races competed: 38
- Drivers' Championships: 0
- Race victories: 0
- Pole positions: 0

Midwest Transit Racing is a disbanded NASCAR Winston Cup Series team owned and operated by Hal Hicks and Mike Witter. They were originally based in Daytona Beach, Florida, near NASCAR's headquarters, but would eventually move their operations to Mooresville, North Carolina. It was formed in 1998 as No. 03 with Dan Pardus driving and Midwest Transit as the sponsor. Before the car hit the track however, NASCAR changed the car number to 07 for unspecified reasons. The team planned to run as many races as possible, but several starts led to nothing but DNQ's until the Pepsi 400, where Pardus finished 36th after a crash. The team tried again in 1999, they would switch their car number again, this time to No. 50, and right before attempting Talladega, they would hire Lake Speed as their general manager. When Pardus did not qualify for any of his attempts, he was replaced by Ricky Craven. At first, the combination seemed to work, but in 2000, the team began to fail to qualify for races again as well as having problems finishing races. After Craven quit the team, Rick Mast drove the car briefly, attempting races on a limited schedule, before Rich Bickle took over for one race at Indianapolis. After that, the team laid off all their employees and suspended operations, ending a brief but tumultuous run in NASCAR.

== Car No. 50 results ==
NASCAR Winston Cup Series results
Year	Driver	No.	Make	1	2	3	4	5	6	7	8	9	10	11	12	13	14	15	16	17	18	19	20	21	22	23	24	25	26	27	28	29	30	31	32	33	34	35	36	Owners	Pts
1998	Dan Pardus	07	Chevy	DAY; DNQ	CAR	LVS	ATL	DAR	BRI	TEX	MAR	TAL; DNQ	CAL	CLT; DNQ	DOV	RCH	MCH	POC	SON	NHA	POC	IND; DNQ	GLN	MCH	BRI	NHA; DNQ	DAR	RCH	DOV	MAR	CLT	TAL; DNQ	DAY; 36	PHO	CAR	ATL				52nd	160
1999	Dan Pardus	50	Chevy	DAY; DNQ	CAR; Wth^{†}							TAL; DNQ	CAL	RCH	CLT; DNQ	DOV	MCH	POC	SON																					46th	855
1999	Billy Standridge	50	Chevy		CAR; DNQ																																			46th	855
1999	Ron Hornaday Jr.	50	Chevy			LVS; DNQ	ATL	DAR	TEX	BRI	MAR																													46th	855
1999	Ricky Craven	50	Chevy																	DAY; 43	NHA; 13	POC	IND; 34	GLN	MCH; 30	BRI; 42	DAR	RCH	NHA; 43	DOV; 40	MAR; 24	CLT; 43	TAL	CAR; 41	PHO; 30	HOM; 32	ATL; DNQ			46th	855
2000	Ricky Craven	50	Chevy	DAY; DNQ	CAR; DNQ	LVS; 40	ATL	DAR; DNQ	BRI; DNQ	TEX	MAR; 31	TAL; 29	CAL	RCH; 40	CLT; 42	DOV	MCH; DNQ	POC	SON	DAY; 29	NHA; 17	POC	IND; 41	GLN	MCH; 37	BRI; DNQ	DAR	RCH; 26	NHA; 36	DOV	MAR; 20	CLT; DNQ	TAL; 30	CAR; 15	PHO; 18	HOM; DNQ	ATL; 30			45th	1393
2001	Rick Mast	50	Chevy	DAY; DNQ	CAR; 32	LVS; DNQ	ATL; DNQ	DAR; DNQ	BRI; 36	TEX; DNQ	MAR; 41	TAL; DNQ	CAL	RCH; 20	CLT; 32	DOV; DNQ	MCH; DNQ	POC; 22	SON	DAY; 34	CHI	NHA; 14	POC																	45th	890
2001	Rich Bickle	50	Chevy																					IND; 32	GLN	MCH	BRI	DAR	RCH	DOV	KAN	CLT	MAR	TAL	PHO	CAR	HOM	ATL	NHA	45th	890
^{†} - Replaced after first round qualifying by Billy Standridge
