= Kevin Lepage =

American racing driver (born 1962)

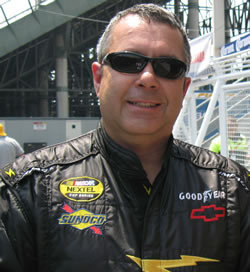
- Lepage in 2008
- Born: June 26, 1962 (age 64); Shelburne, Vermont, U.S.

NASCAR Cup Series career
- 201 races run over 11 years
- Best finish: 25th (1999)
- First race: 1997 UAW-GM Quality 500 (Charlotte)
- Last race: 2007 Lenox Industrial Tools 300 (Loudon)
Wins	Top tens	Poles
0	9	1

NASCAR O'Reilly Auto Parts Series career
- 350 races run over 21 years
- 2014 position: 34th
- Best finish: 8th (1996)
- First race: 1986 Oxford 250 (Oxford)
- Last race: 2014 Dover 200 (Dover)
- First win: 1996 Jiffy Lube Miami 300 (Homestead)
- Last win: 1998 Food City 250 (Bristol)
Wins	Top tens	Poles
2	51	4

NASCAR FedEx Freight Truck Series career
- 7 races run over 5 years
- Best finish: 61st (2006)
- First race: 2005 MBNA RacePoints 200 (Dover)
- Last race: 2009 AAA Insurance 200 (Dover)
Wins	Top tens	Poles
0	0	0
- Statistics up to date as of September 27, 2014.

Kevin Paul Lepage (born June 26, 1962) is an American former professional stock car racing driver, who last drove in NASCAR in 2014.

== Racing career ==
=== Early career ===
Lepage spent the 1980s driving in both the Busch North series and the Vermont-based American Canadian Tour series. He drove with occasional success in these series for the better part of fourteen years. The highlight during this time was three victories at Vermont's Thunder Road International SpeedBowl in its famous "Milk Bowl" race in 1985, 1989 and 1993.

=== Early Busch Series career ===
Lepage made his Busch Series debut in 1986 at Oxford Plains Speedway, starting 41st and finishing 15th in the No. 09 Buick owned by Carl Merrill. He became a Busch Series regular in 1994, serving as an owner/driver in the No. 71 Vermont Teddy Bear Company car and running for Rookie of the Year honors. He had a best finish of ninth at New Hampshire International Speedway, in which he got a flat tire at the very end of the race, and finished 24th in points. The 1995 season resulted in five top-tens and finishing 18th in points. At the end of the season, he lost his sponsorship and ran his own car in 1996 unsponsored until April. Lepage then joined David Ridling and his No. 88 Ridling Motorsports team with sponsorship from Ridling's own Farmer's Choice Fertilizer. He won his first career race at the season finale Jiffy Lube Miami 300 with Hype Energy sponsorship. He finished eighth in points with one win, three top-fives, and ten top-tens. He ran most of the 1997 season driving for Ridling before leaving due to the team losing its sponsor. Lepage would finish out the year running for Phoenix Racing and ST Motorsports. He finished 12th in points, posting three top-fives and six top-tens. Lepage had his Cup debut by qualifying for the Fall Charlotte race in the No. 91 LJ Racing car in an impressive twelfth. He would also run the Fall Talladega and Atlanta races with finishes of 17th at Talladega and 29th at Atlanta.

=== Winston Cup 1998–2002 ===
Lepage made the move to Winston Cup in 1998, driving for the LJ Racing team. Despite the team's lack of sponsorship, Lepage posted two 14th-place finishes, catching the eye of Jack Roush, owner of Roush Racing. Lepage announced his decision to depart LJ Racing in late June 1998 and sat out six races to work out the details of the new contract with Roush. He would drive the No. 16 Primestar Ford Taurus in place of Ted Musgrave, who was released after Lepage's hiring. He earned a pair of top-ten finishes in thirteen races for Roush, his best finish being a sixth place at Charlotte. Despite missing several races, he nearly won the 1998 Rookie of the Year title. Lepage also drove in the Busch Series for Doug Taylor's No. 40 team with sponsorship from Channellock. Lepage finished 14th in points despite only starting 24 races out of 31. Lepage won his second career race at the August Food City 250 at Bristol and won his first career pole at the June MBNA Platinum 200 at Dover. He finished the year with one win, six top-fives, and ten top-tens.

Lepage returned in 1999 with sponsorship from Primestar which switched to TV Guide in April after Primestar was sold to the General Motors-owned DirecTV. He had one top-five, two top-tens and won the pole at the season-ending NAPA 500, earning him a 25th-place finish in points. The highlight of the season was a 5th-place finish in the Southern 500 which qualified him for the Winston No Bull 5 at Talladega. Lepage also ran in the Busch Series driving the No. 99 J&J Racing/Brewco Motorsports car with sponsorship from Red Man. He finished 35th in points with fourteen starts, two top-fives, and six top-tens.

Lepage began 2000 unsponsored, before picking up backing from FamilyClick.com. He failed to qualify twice and finished 28th in points with one top-five and three top-tens with a best finish of fifth at Texas. At the end of the year, FamilyClick ended its backing and Roush closed the No. 16 team. That season Lepage restarted his No. 71 Busch team as Matrix Motorsports in a partnership with Brewco Motorsports with sponsorship from Red Man, Southern Pride Chewing Tobacco and State Fair Corn Dogs. He finished 42nd in points with ten starts, one top-five, and two top-tens with a best finish of third at Atlanta.

In 2001, Lepage returned to the Busch Series to run his own team, Matrix Motorsports, driving the No. 71 State Fair Corn Dogs/Ball Park Franks Ford. Running fifteen races, he had one top-five (third at Fontana), four top-tens, and a pole at Kansas Speedway. In addition to those races, he drove for Phoenix Racing at Loudon (finished 35th). His team also won the pole (finished eighth) at Watkins Glen with Scott Pruett. He also returned to the Cup Series, running the No. 4 Kodak Chevrolet for Morgan-McClure Motorsports, replacing Robby Gordon after five races. Lepage had a best finish of 11th (Texas) in 21 races with them. Late in the season, he switched to the No. 7 NationsRent Ultra Motorsports Ford, posting a tenth-place finish at Talladega Superspeedway. Despite missing seven races, Lepage ended up 36th in points.

=== 2002–2007 ===
Early in 2002, Lepage's team went inactive due to a lack of sponsorship, even though he had an eighth at Daytona and a fourth at Las Vegas. He soon joined Brewco Motorsports, driving their No. 37 Timber Wolf Chevy. In 24 starts that year, he had six top-tens and two poles, finishing 25th in points. He also ran three Cup races, two in the No. 38 Quest Motor Racing Ford, and another for BAM Racing at Talladega in a car sponsored by Billy Ray Cyrus's show Doc. His best finish that year was a 40th at Loudon.

In 2003, Lepage ran his own team at the Cup level for one race, finishing 32nd at the Coca-Cola 600 along with the Winston Open. He ran two races that year for CLR Racing, where he had a fourth-place start at Michigan, before returning to Morgan-McClure to finish the year, his best finish a 14th at Atlanta. He teamed with Morgan-McClure again in 2004, but after six races, Lepage departed due to a lack of sponsorship. He then signed with Competitive Edge Motorsports, posting a best finish of 41st twice, before leaving the team. He ended the season with R&J Racing, where he had a best finish of 27th at Phoenix International Raceway. He also ran 11 races in the Busch Series for MacDonald Motorsports, where he had two top-15 finishes.

In 2005, Lepage returned to R&J, and started the season off with a third-place finish in the Gatorade Duels and a ninth place finish at the Daytona 500. Unfortunately, the closest Lepage came to another top-ten was a 12th-place finish at Lowe's Motor Speedway in the Coca-Cola 600, and was released from the ride after the Brickyard 400. He signed with Peak Performance Racing for the balance of the year, and had a sixth-place qualifying effort at Kansas. He finished the season 39th in points. He also ran six races with MacDonald in the Busch Series as well, posting a ninth-place finish at Lowe's. That year, Lepage made his debut in the Craftsman Truck Series for Green Light Racing at Dover finishing nineteenth.

Lepage returned to Peak for 2006, but due to a lack of funding, the team was sold to Front Row Motorsports in April. Lepage ran a couple of races for FRM before leaving for BAM Racing. He ran twelve races for BAM with a best finish of 21st at Bristol Motor Speedway before leaving them. Lepage then rejoined Front Row Motorsports making two of the final eight races in their No. 34 and No. 61 cars. He ended up 40th in points even with missing fourteen races. He also ran a limited schedule in the Busch Series for Mac Hill Motorsports with a best finish of 19th in seven races. Lepage ran two races for Green Light Racing in the Craftsman Truck Series with a best finish of 21st at Michigan. At the end of the year, Lepage sold the remnants of Matrix Motorsports to start a lawn care business called Matrix Lawn and Landscaping.

In 2007, Lepage started the year driving the No. 34 Front Row Motorsports car in the races where the team could afford to run two cars. Starting in late April, Front Row would mainly run the No. 37 car with Lepage making most of the attempts. In 27 attempts, Lepage was only able to make two races; at Darlington and New Hampshire Motor Speedway. He also drove a part-time schedule for a few teams in the Busch Series including the No. 52 Means Racing Ford, as well as some additional races for Randy MacDonald and D.D.L. Motorsports with a best finish of 28th at Watkins Glen. Lepage also had two starts for Team Racing in the Craftsman Truck Series with a best finish of 35th at Texas.

=== 2008–2017 ===
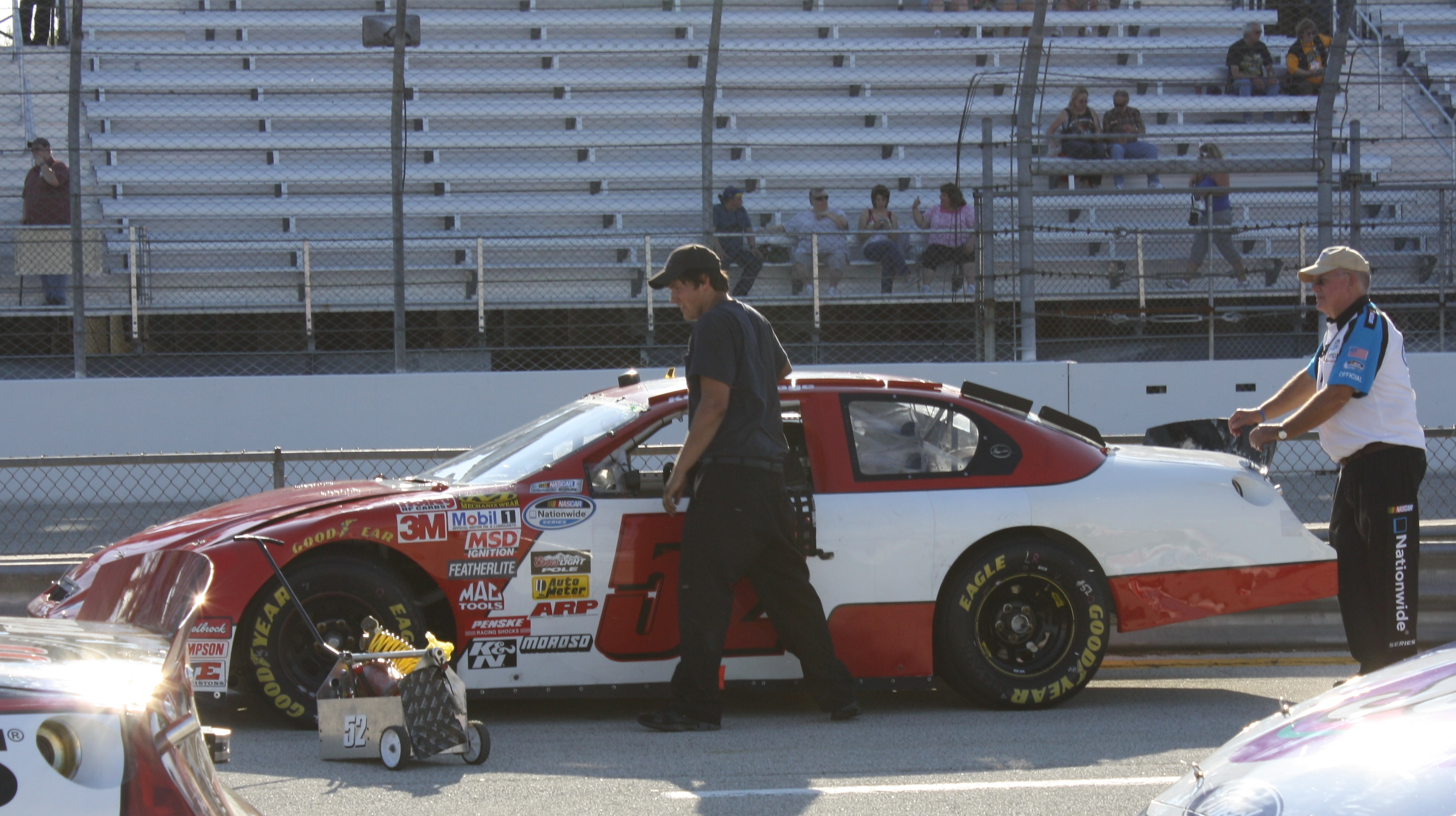
Lepage's 2009 No. 52 Jimmy Means Nationwide car

Lepage returned to driving full-time in the Nationwide Series (formerly known as the Busch Series) in 2008, driving for Specialty Racing. While racing for Specialty, Lepage made one of the most infamous racing moves in the history of NASCAR at Talladega when he exited pit road and merged onto the track just before turn 1 directly in front of the lead pack, which was approaching him at speeds nearing 190 mph (310 km/h), while himself only driving at roughly 110 mph (180 km/h), triggering a fifteen-car accident and drawing out a red flag. Lepage blamed it on the spotter for every other team stating "nobody recognized my car was damaged and vastly underpowered," but later apologized for the accident himself. Lepage was released by Specialty after the July Daytona race and was replaced by Brandon Whitt. The following race at Chicagoland, he failed to qualify a car brought by Front Row Motorsports. After he failed to qualify, Lepage drove the No. 52 Means Racing entry for Brad Teague in order to maintain his position in the driver's points. He then attempted to race at Gateway in Mike Harmon's No. 84 Chevrolet, but failed to qualify. Later in the season, he was hired to drive the No. 73 for Derrike Cope, and finished the season 28th in driver's points, despite missing eight races. Lepage ran one Truck Series race at Homestead for Green Light Racing finishing 35th.

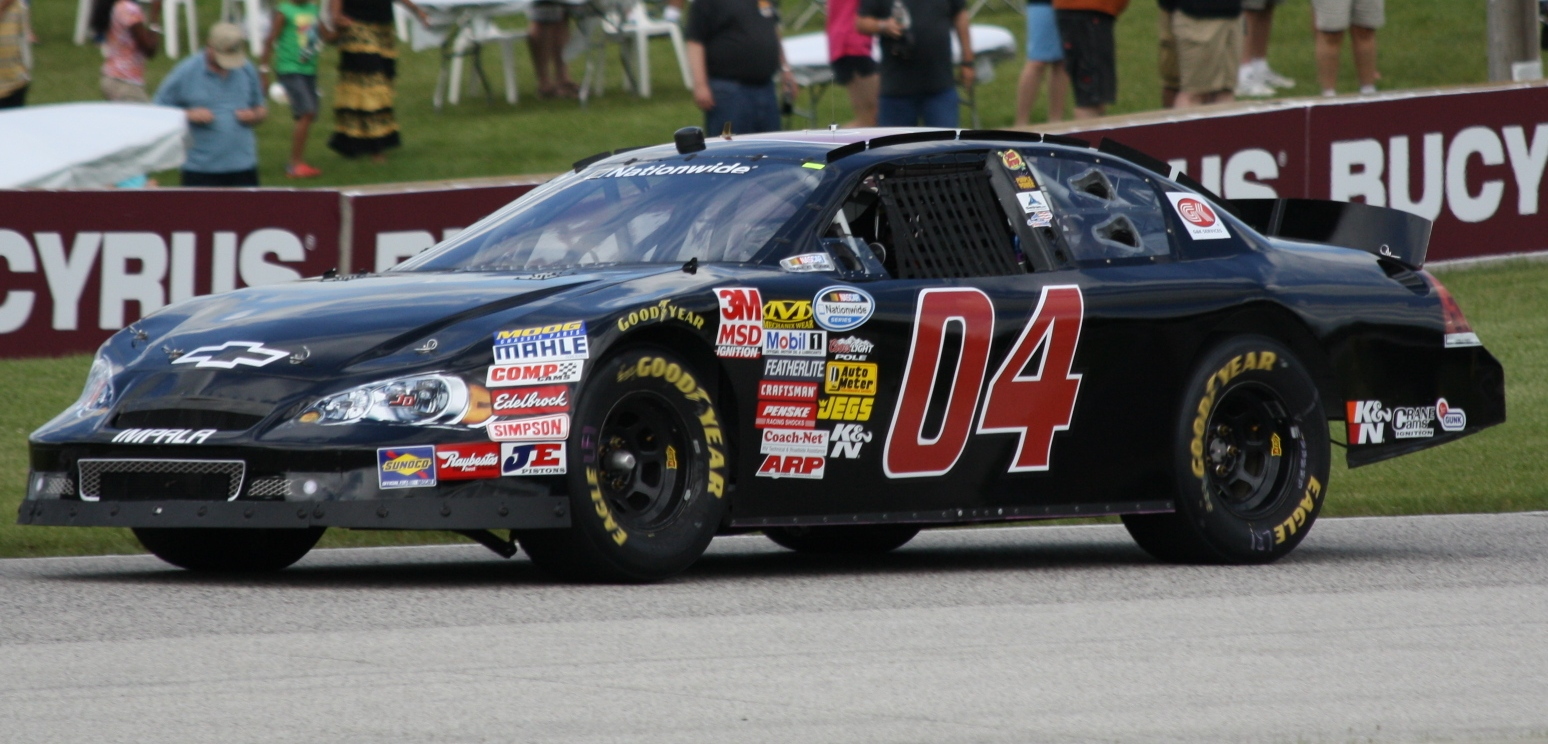
2010 Nationwide car

He began the 2009 season without a full-time ride, but after running Derrike Cope's No. 73 at Bristol, Lepage joined Jimmy Means' team at Texas in April until leaving after the June race at New Hampshire. He then joined Derrike Cope's team for the rest of the season at Chicago primarily driving the No. 78, but also occasionally driving the No. 73. Lepage also ran one race for Green Light Racing at Dover in the Camping World Truck Series finishing 33rd, his most recent start in that series to date.

Lepage announced on February 5, 2010, that he would be returning to Mac Hill Motorsports for the 2010 season with sponsorship from Revolucion World Wide/Start Energy Drink. Unfortunately, the sponsorship deal fell through after four races and the team was forced to "start and park" races in order to keep costs down. Even with this measure, finances forced the team to start skipping races by mid year. The team partnered up with RaceDaySponsor.com in order to give local sponsors an opportunity to be a sponsor each week. This earned the team finances to get to the track, but not enough to run full races. When the Mac Hill team was unable to get to the track, Lepage got to run some races for No. 52 Jimmy Means Racing Chevrolet (made four out of five attempts) and No. 04 Davis Motorsports Chevrolet at Road America. Even with the limited finances, Lepage was able to make 25 out of 31 race attempts and ended up 40th in points.

In 2010, Lepage was in a Sprint Cup car for the first time since 2007. Lepage joined back up with Morgan-McClure Motorsports to run the Irwin Tools Night Race at Bristol with sponsorship from Alpha Natural Resources/Joy Mining Machinery. Lepage was unable to qualify for the race.

On November 20, 2010, Mac Hill Motorsports announced that it was discontinuing its Nationwide Series team, allowing Lepage to seek another ride.

On January 10, 2011, Lepage announced that he would drive for Team Rensi Motorsports No. 24 team in the Nationwide Series, bringing sponsorship from RaceDaySponsor.com, marking the first time since 2008 that Lepage would run a full race distance. Not enough sponsorship was found and the team was forced to start and park four of the five races they ran. After the spring Texas race, they closed down. On April 26, Lepage announced that he would be joining Means Racing starting at Richmond and would work with the team to procure more sponsorship for the rest of the season. Sponsorship was found to allow Lepage to run 17 races without having to start and park, with a best finish of 20th at Phoenix. Lepage finished 27th in points, which was his best finish since 2008.

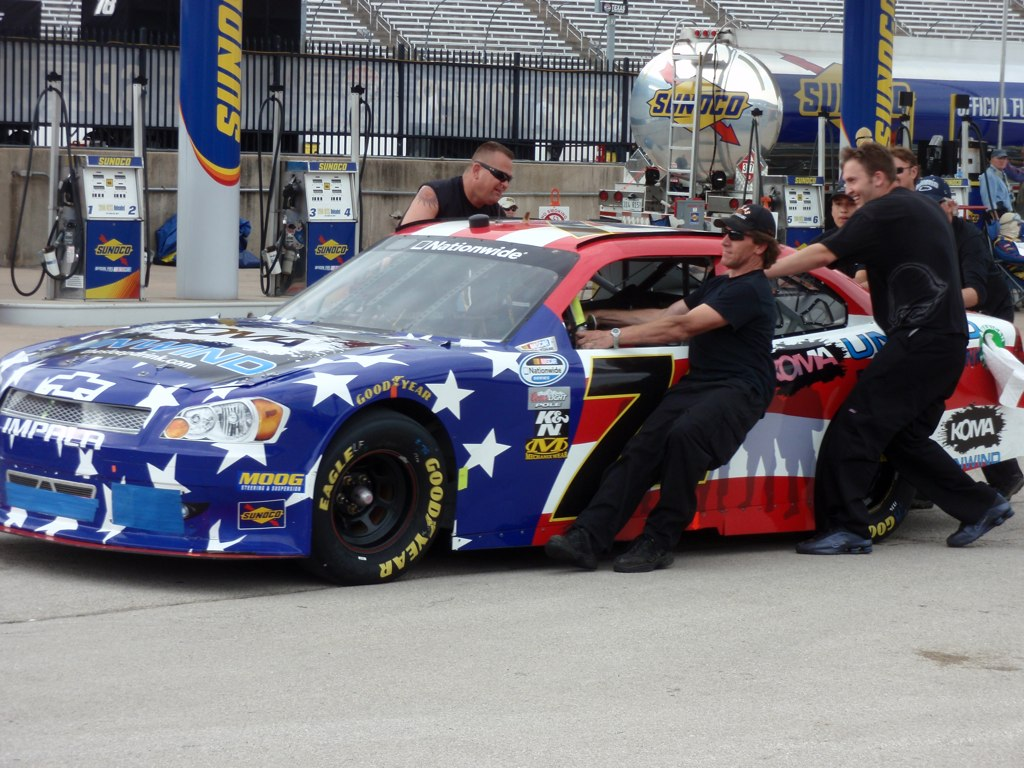
Lepage's Mike Harmon Racing car at Texas Motor Speedway, April 2012

In February 2012, Lepage announced that Race Day Sponsor.com and himself were no longer working together. Lepage wasn't able to start his season until securing a ride in the No. 28 Robinson-Blakeney Racing for the fourth and fifth races of the season at Bristol and California with a best finish of 31st at Bristol. That team shut down but Lepage was able to start and park the next weeks race at Texas with Mike Harmon Racing's No. 74. The next three weeks Lepage drove the No. 52 Means Racing car at Richmond, Talladega and Darlington with a best finish of 27th at Richmond. Lepage then substituted in Tri-Star Motorsports start and park No. 10 for the next four races highlighted by qualifying efforts of 25th at Dover and Michigan. After the sub job ended, Lepage start and parked for Means Racing at Kentucky. Lepage then joined the Deware Racing Group in their No. 86. In preparation for the 2013 season, the team ran a limited schedule of nine of the final seventeen races. Due to a lack of sponsorship the team start and parked seven of the nine races, though with sponsorship from Qello at Bristol and Kengor Metals at Charlotte the team had finishes of 20th and 26th respectively. Lepage ended up 35th in points with only running 20 of 33 races.

The 2013 season started with the Deware Racing Group unable to secure sponsorship, which left them mostly inactive and Lepage starting the season without a ride. It took to the third race of season at Las Vegas for Lepage to get a ride with No. 74 Mike Harmon Racing for that race and weeks later at Texas with a best finish of 28th at Texas. Three weeks later, Lepage start and parked for Means Racing at Darlington. In June at Iowa, Lepage drove the No. 87 NEMCO Motorsports car in practice in preparation for owner/driver Joe Nemechek to arrive from Pocono Raceway to run the race. Due to the Iowa race being delayed a day cause of rain, Lepage got to drive the 87 to a 19th-place finish while Nemechek drove at Pocono. Lepage would finish the season start and parking the No. 74 in four races, failing to qualify the No. 86 at Bristol and running JD Motorsports's No. 4 car in races at Mid-Ohio and Kentucky with finishes of 20th and 19th respectively. Lepage ended up 39th in points with only running 10 of 33 races.

Lepage started the 2014 season without a ride. Starting with the third race of the season at Las Vegas, Lepage drove the No. 74 Mike Harmon Racing Dodge. He drove for them through the fifth race of the season at California with a best finish of thirtieth at California. Lepage joined JD Motorsports in their No. 87 for the next three races. His best finish was a 19th at Darlington, but the ride ended when the 87 team's only car was wrecked at Richmond. Lepage drove the 74 at Charlotte but finished 39th due to a rear gear failure. Lepage later drove start and park efforts for Tri-Star Motorsports at Michigan and JGL Racing at Elkhart Lake. Starting at Kentucky in June, Lepage drove the Mike Harmon Racing No. 74 at six race weekends until Richmond in September with a best finish of 33rd at New Hampshire to go with 2 DNQ's. Lepage would make his last career start with TriStar Motorsports at Dover finishing 31st. Lepage did attempt to qualify at Homestead with Mike Harmon Racing but failed to qualify.

Lepage was unable to find sponsorship to compete in NASCAR after the 2014 season and instead focused on his business interests. On March 21, 2017, Lepage announced he would run in the 55th Milk Bowl on October 1, 2017, at Thunder Road International SpeedBowl with Boyce Racing in what is hinted at as his final race. On August 23, 2017, Lepage announced State Water Heaters, Citgo, Vermont Teddy Bear Company, Allen Lumber and Shearer Chevrolet as the sponsors for his final race. Unfortunately for Lepage, he had to run the Last Chance qualifying race due to a slow qualifying speed. Due to a spin during that race, Lepage came up two positions short of being able to compete in the 55th Milk Bowl.

== Personal life ==
Lepage was born in Shelburne, Vermont on June 26, 1962. He was the only stock car driver from Vermont competing in the NASCAR Winston Cup Series in the 1990s. Lepage is a practicing Catholic.

== Motorsports career results ==
=== NASCAR ===
(key) (Bold – Pole position awarded by qualifying time. Italics – Pole position earned by points standings or practice time. * – Most laps led.)

==== Sprint Cup Series ====
NASCAR Sprint Cup Series results
Year	Team	No.	Make	1	2	3	4	5	6	7	8	9	10	11	12	13	14	15	16	17	18	19	20	21	22	23	24	25	26	27	28	29	30	31	32	33	34	35	36	NSCC	Pts	Ref
1997	LJ Racing	91	Chevy	DAY	CAR	RCH	ATL	DAR	TEX	BRI	MAR	SON	TAL	CLT	DOV	POC	MCH	CAL	DAY	NHA	POC	IND	GLN	MCH	BRI	DAR	RCH	NHA; DNQ	DOV	MAR	CLT; 40	TAL; 17	CAR	PHO	ATL; 29					56th	231	
1998	LJ Racing	91	Chevy	DAY; 43	CAR; DNQ	LVS; 28	ATL; 14	DAR; 34	BRI; 27	TEX; 37	MAR; 42	TAL; 14	CAL; 40	CLT; 36	DOV; 28	RCH; DNQ	MCH; 40	POC; 19	SON; QL^{†}	NHA	POC	IND	GLN																	35th	2196	
1998	American Equipment Racing	96	Chevy													RCH; 33																								35th	2196	
1998	Roush Racing	16	Ford																					MCH; 17	BRI; 10	NHA; 16	DAR; 39	RCH; 36	DOV; 12	MAR; 17	CLT; 6	TAL; 35	DAY; 40	PHO; 13	CAR; 43	ATL; 18				35th	2196	
1999	Roush Racing	16	Ford	DAY; 13	CAR; 42	LVS; 21	ATL; 19	DAR; 22	TEX; 41	BRI; 35	MAR; 21	TAL; 12	CAL; 18	RCH; 13	CLT; 26	DOV; 26	MCH; 29	POC; 17	SON; 32	DAY; 30	NHA; 22	POC; 24	IND; 30	GLN; 25	MCH; 39	BRI; 22	DAR; 5	RCH; 26	NHA; 26	DOV; 13	MAR; 27	CLT; 9	TAL; 18	CAR; 22	PHO; 24	HOM; 26	**ATL**; 17			25th	3185	
2000	Roush Racing	16	Ford	DAY; 36	CAR; 27	LVS; 11	ATL; 38	DAR; 10	BRI; 30	TEX; 5	MAR; 34	TAL; DNQ	CAL; 22	RCH; 21	CLT; 15	DOV; 21	MCH; 21	POC; 26	SON; 41	DAY; 37	NHA; 31	POC; 23	IND; 36	GLN; 32	MCH; 18	BRI; 18	DAR; 7	RCH; 22	NHA; 38	DOV; 38	MAR; 29	CLT; 12	TAL; 43	CAR; 36	PHO; 21	HOM; 27	ATL; DNQ			28th	2795	
2001	Morgan-McClure Motorsports	4	Chevy	DAY	CAR	LVS	ATL	DAR	BRI; 15	TEX; 11	MAR; 18	TAL; 42	CAL; DNQ	RCH; 27	CLT; 35	DOV; 24	MCH; 31	POC; 21	SON; 43	DAY; 31	CHI; 34	NHA; 30	POC; 42	IND; DNQ	GLN; 33	MCH; 38	BRI; 13	DAR; 28	RCH; 39	DOV; 16	KAN; 13									36th	2461	
2001	Ultra Motorsports	7	Ford																													CLT; 13	MAR; 21	TAL; 10	PHO; 32	CAR; 16	HOM; 29	ATL; 19	NHA; 35	36th	2461	
2002	Quest Motor Racing	38	Ford	DAY	CAR	LVS	ATL	DAR	BRI	TEX	MAR	TAL	CAL	RCH	CLT; 43	DOV	POC	MCH	SON	DAY	CHI	NHA	POC	IND	GLN	MCH	BRI	DAR	RCH											62nd	132	
2002	Quest Motor Racing	37	Ford																											NHA; 40										62nd	132	
2002	BAM Racing	49	Dodge																												DOV; 36	KAN	TAL	CLT	MAR	ATL	CAR	PHO	HOM	62nd	132	
2003	Matrix Motorsports	71	Ford	DAY	CAR	LVS	ATL	DAR	BRI	TEX	TAL	MAR	CAL	RCH	CLT; 32	DOV	POC	MCH	SON	DAY	CHI	NHA	POC																	43rd	877	
2003	CLR Racing	57	Ford																					IND; 30	GLN	MCH; 31	BRI													43rd	877	
2003	Morgan-McClure Motorsports	4	Pontiac																									DAR; 15	RCH	NHA	DOV; 27	TAL; DNQ	KAN	CLT; 21	MAR; 35	ATL; 14	PHO; 23	CAR; 42	HOM; 18	43rd	877	
2004	Morgan-McClure Motorsports	4	Chevy	DAY; 32	CAR; 22	LVS; 36	ATL; 36	DAR; 28	BRI; 30	TEX	MAR	TAL	CAL	RCH																										43rd	915	
2004	Competitive Edge Motorsports	51	Chevy												CLT; 43	DOV; 41	POC; 43	MCH; 41	SON	DAY	CHI; 42	NHA; DNQ	POC; DNQ	IND; DNQ	GLN	MCH; DNQ														43rd	915	
2004	R&J Racing	37	Dodge																								BRI; 43	CAL; DNQ	RCH; DNQ	NHA; DNQ	DOV; 36	TAL; DNQ	KAN	CLT; 39	MAR; 42	ATL; 28	PHO; 27	DAR; DNQ	HOM; DNQ	43rd	915	
2005	R&J Racing	37	Dodge	DAY; 9	CAL; 31	LVS; DNQ	ATL; 30	BRI; DNQ	MAR; 28	TEX; DNQ	PHO; 28	TAL; DNQ	DAR; 32	RCH; DNQ	CLT; 12	DOV; 33	POC; 38	MCH; 37	SON; DNQ	DAY; 25	CHI; 28	NHA; 37	POC; 35	IND; DNQ	GLN	MCH	BRI	CAL	RCH	NHA										39th	1515	
2005	Peak Fitness Racing	66	Ford																												DOV; 40	TAL; 30	KAN; 36	CLT; 21	MAR	ATL; 42	TEX; 33	PHO; DNQ	HOM; 35	39th	1515	
2006	Peak Fitness Racing	61	Ford	DAY; 25	CAL; 35	LVS; 37	ATL; 35	BRI; 31	MAR; DNQ	TEX; 32		TAL; 28																												40th	1346	
2006	Peak Fitness Racing	61	Chevy								PHO; DNQ																													40th	1346	
2006	Front Row Motorsports	61	Dodge										RCH; 42																								TEX; DNQ		HOM; DNQ	40th	1346	
2006	BAM Racing	49	Dodge											DAR; 36	CLT; DNQ	DOV; 39	POC; 31	MCH; 34	SON	DAY; DNQ	CHI; DNQ	NHA; 30	POC; 34	IND; DNQ	GLN	MCH; 41	BRI; 21	CAL; 38	RCH; 33	NHA; 30	DOV; 37	KAN; DNQ								40th	1346	
2006	Front Row Motorsports	34	Dodge																														TAL; DNQ							40th	1346	
2006	Front Row Motorsports	34	Chevy																															CLT; DNQ	MAR; 43			PHO; DNQ		40th	1346	
2006	Front Row Motorsports	61	Chevy																																	ATL; 43				40th	1346	
2007	Front Row Motorsports	34	Dodge	DAY; DNQ	CAL; DNQ	LVS; DNQ	ATL; DNQ			TEX; DNQ	PHO	TAL; DNQ																									TEX; DNQ	PHO	HOM	64th	95	
2007	Front Row Motorsports	37	Dodge					BRI; DNQ	MAR; DNQ				RCH; DNQ	DAR; 42	CLT; DNQ	DOV; DNQ	POC; DNQ	MCH; DNQ	SON	NHA; 35	DAY; DNQ	CHI; DNQ	IND; DNQ	POC; DNQ	GLN	MCH; DNQ	BRI; DNQ	CAL	RCH; DNQ	NHA; DNQ	DOV; DNQ	KAN	TAL; DNQ	CLT	MAR; DNQ	ATL				64th	95	
2010	Morgan-McClure Motorsports	4	Chevy	DAY	CAL	LVS	ATL	BRI	MAR	PHO	TEX	TAL	RCH	DAR	DOV	CLT	POC	MCH	SON	NHA	DAY	CHI	IND	POC	GLN	MCH	BRI; DNQ	ATL	RCH	NHA	DOV	KAN	CAL	CLT	MAR	TAL	TEX	PHO	HOM	NA	-	
^{†} - Qualified but replaced by Tommy Kendall

===== Daytona 500 =====
Year	Team	Manufacturer	Start	Finish
1998	LJ Racing	Chevrolet	20	43
1999	Roush Racing	Ford	14	13
2000	Roush Racing	Ford	41	36
2004	Morgan-McClure Motorsports	Chevrolet	32	32
2005	R&J Racing	Dodge	8	9
2006	Peak Fitness Racing	Ford	31	25
2007	Front Row Motorsports	Dodge	DNQ	

==== Nationwide Series ====
NASCAR Nationwide Series results
Year	Team	No.	Make	1	2	3	4	5	6	7	8	9	10	11	12	13	14	15	16	17	18	19	20	21	22	23	24	25	26	27	28	29	30	31	32	33	34	35	NNSC	Pts	Ref
1986	Norseman Racing	09	Buick	DAY	CAR	HCY	MAR	BRI	DAR	SBO	LGY	JFC	DOV	CLT	SBO	HCY	ROU	IRP	SBO	RAL	OXF; 15	SBO	HCY	LGY	ROU	BRI	DAR	RCH	DOV	MAR	ROU	CLT	CAR	MAR					104th		
1994	Lepage Racing	71	Chevy	DAY; DNQ	CAR; 37	RCH; 12	ATL; DNQ		DAR; 32		BRI; 26	ROU; 27	NHA; 9	NZH; 23	CLT; DNQ	DOV; 28	MYB; 27	GLN; 15	MLW; 40	SBO; DNQ	TAL; 26	HCY; DNQ	IRP; 19	MCH	BRI; 27	DAR; 22	RCH	DOV; 29	CLT; 30	MAR; 18	CAR; 23								24th	1865	
1994	Lepage Racing	71	Buick					MAR; 34		HCY; 16																													24th	1865	
1995	Lepage Racing	71	Chevy	DAY; DNQ	CAR; 18	RCH; 19	ATL	NSV	DAR; 9	BRI; DNQ	HCY; 20	NHA; 17	NZH; 17	CLT; 10	DOV; 27	MYB; 21	GLN; 11	MLW; 25	TAL; 22	SBO; 10	IRP; 24	MCH; 19	BRI; 8	DAR; 16	RCH; 33	DOV; 40	CLT; 16	CAR; 10	HOM; 21										18th	2355	
1996	Lepage Racing	71	Chevy	DAY; 45	CAR; 19	RCH; 32	ATL; 42	NSV; 18	DAR; 29	BRI; 23																													8th	2870	
1996	Ridling Motorsports	88	Chevy								HCY; 8	NZH; 7	CLT; 28	DOV; 14	SBO; 9	MYB; 4	GLN; 28	MLW; 12	NHA; 19	TAL; 9	IRP; 12	MCH; 2	BRI; 28	DAR; 9	RCH; DNQ	DOV; 31	CLT; 7	CAR; 7	HOM; 1*										8th	2870	
1996	Stricklin Racing	28	Chevy																						RCH; 34														8th	2870	
1997	Ridling Motorsports	88	Chevy	DAY; 22	CAR; 37	RCH; 23	ATL; 21	LVS; 13	DAR; 21	HCY; 20	TEX; 8	BRI; 28	NSV; 8	TAL; 13	NHA; 19	NZH; 15	CLT; 2	DOV; 4	SBO; 4	GLN; 12	MLW; 26	MYB; 11	GTY; 12	IRP; 32	MCH; 28	BRI; 10	DAR; 20	RCH; 23	DOV; 32	CLT; 34									12th	3248	
1997	Phoenix Racing	4	Chevy																												CAL; 12	CAR; 33							12th	3248	
1997	ST Motorsports	42	Chevy																														HOM; 17						12th	3248	
1998	Specialty Racing	40	Chevy	DAY	CAR	LVS; 13	NSV; 29	DAR; 21	BRI; 14	TEX; 40	HCY; DNQ	TAL; 16	NHA; 3	NZH; 14	CLT; 23	**DOV**; 13	RCH; 7	PPR	GLN	MLW; 18	MYB	CAL; 2		IRP; 20	MCH; 4	BRI; 1	DAR; 4	RCH; 7	DOV; 13	CLT; 7	GTY	CAR; 2	ATL; 25	HOM; 20					14th	3052	
1998	ST Motorsports	59	Chevy																				SBO; 10																14th	3052	
1999	Brewco Motorsports	99	Chevy	DAY; 7	CAR; 36	LVS; 9	ATL; 4	DAR; 5	TEX; 43	NSV; 39	BRI	TAL	CAL	NHA	RCH; 23	NZH	CLT; 40	DOV	SBO	GLN	MLW	MYB	PPR	GTY; 11	IRP		BRI; DNQ	DAR	RCH; 17	DOV	CLT; 31	CAR	MEM; DNQ	PHO	HOM; 6				35th	1476	
1999	PRW Racing	77	Ford																							MCH; 9													35th	1476	
2000	Brewco Motorsports	71	Ford	DAY	CAR; 13	LVS	ATL; 3	DAR	BRI	TEX; 27	NSV	TAL	CAL	RCH; 43	NHA	CLT; 7	DOV	SBO	MYB	GLN	MLW	NZH	PPR	GTY	IRP	MCH	BRI; 12	DAR; 12	RCH; 12	DOV	CLT; 38	CAR	MEM	PHO	HOM; 27				42nd	1063	
2001	Matrix Motorsports	71	Ford	DAY	CAR	LVS; 21	ATL; 40	DAR; 27	BRI	TEX; 10	NSH; 15	TAL	CAL; 4	RCH; 28	NHA; 35	NZH	CLT; 12	DOV; 15	KEN	MLW	GLN	CHI; 10	GTY	PPR	IRP	MCH; 42	BRI; 28	DAR	RCH	DOV; 6	**KAN**; 12*	CLT	MEM	PHO; 14	CAR	HOM			31st	1687	
2002	Matrix Motorsports	71	Ford	DAY; 8	CAR	LVS; 4	DAR; 21	BRI; 34	TEX	NSH	TAL	CAL	RCH	NHA	NZH																						HOM; 37		25th	2594	
2002	Brewco Motorsports	37	Chevy													CLT; 6	DOV; 18	NSH; 14	KEN; 12	MLW; 11	DAY; 3	CHI; 15	GTY; 9	PPR; 5*	IRP; 32	**MCH**; 36	BRI; 13	DAR; 13	RCH; 11	**DOV**; 24	KAN; 13	CLT; 19	MEM; 43	ATL; 40	CAR	PHO			25th	2594	
2004	MacDonald Motorsports	72	Chevy	DAY	CAR	LVS	DAR	BRI	TEX	NSH	TAL	CAL	GTY	RCH	NZH	CLT; 32	DOV; 24	NSH	KEN	MLW		CHI; 22	NHA; 15	PPR	IRP		BRI; 18	CAL; 30		DOV; 26	KAN; 41	CLT; 28	MEM	ATL; 28					42nd	956	
2004	MacDonald Motorsports	71	Chevy																		DAY; 15					MCH; DNQ			RCH; DNQ						PHO; DNQ	DAR; DNQ	HOM; DNQ		42nd	956	
2005	MacDonald Motorsports	71	Chevy	DAY	CAL	MXC	LVS	ATL	NSH	BRI	TEX	PHO	TAL; 17	DAR	RCH																								64th	557	
2005	MacDonald Motorsports	72	Chevy													CLT; DNQ	DOV	NSH	KEN	MLW	DAY; 22	CHI	NHA	PPR	GTY	IRP	GLN	MCH; 37	BRI; DNQ	CAL; DNQ		DOV; 29	KAN; DNQ	CLT; 9	MEM	TEX; DNQ	PHO; 27	HOM; DNQ	64th	557	
2005	Premier Motorsport	85	Chevy																												RCH; DNQ								64th	557	
2006	Mac Hill Motorsports	56	Chevy	DAY; DNQ	CAL	MXC	LVS; 23	ATL	BRI; 19	TEX	NSH; 39	PHO	TAL	RCH	DAR; 36	CLT	DOV	NSH	KEN	MLW	DAY; 19								BRI; 27	CAL	RCH	DOV	KAN	CLT	MEM	TEX	PHO	HOM	65th	523	
2006	Frank Cicci Racing	34	Chevy																			CHI; 43	NHA	MAR	GTY	IRP	GLN	MCH											65th	523	
2007	Means Racing	52	Ford	DAY	CAL	MXC	LVS; Wth	ATL	BRI	NSH	TEX; 42	PHO; 39	TAL	RCH; 42	DAR; DNQ																								86th	306	
2007	MacDonald Motorsports	72	Dodge													CLT; DNQ																							86th	306	
2007	D.D.L. Motorsports	01	Chevy														DOV; 40	NSH	KEN	MLW	NHA	DAY; 33	CHI	GTY	IRP	CGV													86th	306	
2007	D.D.L. Motorsports	0	Chevy																								GLN; 28	MCH	BRI	CAL	RCH	DOV	KAN	CLT	MEM	TEX	PHO	HOM	86th	306	
2008	Specialty Racing	61	Ford	DAY; DNQ	CAL; 23	LVS; 17	ATL; 27	BRI; 18	NSH; 29	TEX; 31	PHO; 28	MXC; 24	TAL; 35	RCH; 29	DAR; 26	CLT; 26	DOV; 35	NSH; 29	KEN; 24	MLW; 26	NHA; 24	DAY; 24																	28th	1895	
2008	Front Row Motorsports	43	Chevy																				CHI; DNQ																28th	1895	
2008	Means Racing	52	Chevy																				CHI; 34																28th	1895	
2008	Elite 2 Racing	84	Chevy																					GTY; DNQ	IRP	CGV	GLN												28th	1895	
2008	CFK Motorsports	73	Dodge																									MCH; 41	BRI; 41	CAL; 41	RCH	DOV; 39	KAN; 43	CLT; 39	MEM; 43	TEX; 41	PHO; DNQ	HOM; DNQ	28th	1895	
2009	Derrike Cope Inc.	73	Dodge	DAY	CAL	LVS	BRI; 36																	IOW; 39	GLN	MCH; DNQ													61st	689	
2009	Means Racing	52	Chevy					TEX; 33	NSH	PHO	TAL	RCH		CLT; DNQ	DOV; 35	NSH; 34	KEN; DNQ	MLW; DNQ	NHA; 39	DAY																			61st	689	
2009	Means Racing	52	Ford										DAR; 35																										61st	689	
2009	Derrike Cope Inc.	78	Dodge																		CHI; 39	GTY; 37	IRP				BRI; 40	CGV	ATL; 41	RCH; 43	DOV	KAN; 40	CAL; 40	CLT; DNQ	MEM; DNQ	TEX	PHO	HOM	61st	689	
2010	Mac Hill Motorsports	56	Chevy	DAY; DNQ		LVS; 37	BRI; 40	NSH; 42	PHO; 40		TAL; DNQ	RCH; 38	DAR; 38	DOV; 38		NSH; DNQ						GTY; 35	IRP				BRI; DNQ	CGV			DOV; DNQ								40th	1048	
2010	Mac Hill Motorsports	56	Toyota		CAL; 40					TEX; 40					CLT; 37		KEN; 38			DAY; 39	CHI; 37			IOW; 37	GLN	MCH; 42				RCH; 43				CLT; 38	GTY; 39			HOM; 41	40th	1048	
2010	Davis Motorsports	04	Chevy															ROA; 43	NHA																				40th	1048	
2010	Means Racing	52	Chevy																										ATL; 40			KAN; 40	CAL; 38			TEX; 42	PHO; DNQ		40th	1048	
2011	Team Rensi Motorsports	24	Ford	DAY; 41	PHO; 37	LVS; 37	BRI; Wth	CAL; 28	TEX; 39	TAL	NSH																												27th	298	
2011	Means Motorsports	52	Chevy									RCH; 34	DAR; 21	DOV; 38	IOW	CLT; 33	CHI; 28	MCH	ROA	DAY; 33	KEN; 29	NHA; 24	NSH; 28	IRP	IOW	GLN	CGV	BRI; 31	ATL; 30	RCH; 23	CHI	DOV; 27	KAN; 28	CLT; 27	TEX	PHO; 20	HOM; 35		27th	298	
2012	Robinson-Blakeney Racing	28	Chevy	DAY	PHO	LVS	BRI; 31	CAL; 33																															35th	175	
2012	Mike Harmon Racing	74	Chevy						TEX; 42																														35th	175	
2012	Hamilton Means Racing	52	Chevy							RCH; 27	TAL; 43	DAR; 35						KEN; 36	DAY																				35th	175	
2012	TriStar Motorsports	10	Toyota										IOW; 41	CLT; 43	DOV; 39	MCH; 42	ROA																						35th	175	
2012	Deware Racing Group	86	Ford																	NHA; 33	CHI	IND; 40	IOW	GLN	CGV	BRI; 20	ATL	RCH; 33	CHI	KEN; 34	DOV; 34	CLT; 26	KAN	TEX; 40	PHO; 34	HOM			35th	175	
2013	Mike Harmon Racing	74	Chevy	DAY	PHO	LVS; 36	BRI	CAL	TEX; 28	RCH	TAL										CHI; 33	IND	IOW; 32	GLN															39th	148	
2013	Hamilton Means Racing	52	Toyota									DAR; 35	CLT	DOV																									39th	148	
2013	NEMCO-JRR	87	Toyota												IOW; 19	MCH	ROA	KEN	DAY	NHA																			39th	148	
2013	JD Motorsports	4	Chevy																						MOH; 20					KEN; 19	DOV	KAN							39th	148	
2013	Deware Racing Group	86	Chevy																							BRI; DNQ	ATL	RCH											39th	148	
2013	Mike Harmon Racing	74	Dodge																										CHI; 36				CLT; 34	TEX	PHO	HOM			39th	148	
2014	Mike Harmon Racing	74	Dodge	DAY	PHO	LVS; 34	BRI; 34	CAL; 30						CLT; 39	DOV			KEN; DNQ	DAY	NHA; 33	CHI; 40	IND; DNQ	IOW	GLN	MOH	BRI; 38	ATL	RCH; 40	CHI	KEN						HOM; DNQ			34th	137	
2014	JD Motorsports	87	Chevy						TEX; 25	DAR; 19	RCH; 39	TAL	IOW																										34th	137	
2014	TriStar Motorsports	10	Toyota													MCH; 39															DOV; 31	KAN	CLT	TEX	PHO				34th	137	
2014	JGL Racing	93	Dodge														ROA; 38																						34th	137	

==== Camping World Truck Series ====
NASCAR Camping World Truck Series results
Year	Team	No.	Make	1	2	3	4	5	6	7	8	9	10	11	12	13	14	15	16	17	18	19	20	21	22	23	24	25	NCWTC	Pts	Ref
2005	Green Light Racing	08	Chevy	DAY	CAL	ATL	MAR	GTY	MFD	CLT	DOV; 19	TEX	MCH	MLW	KAN	KEN	MEM	IRP	NSH	BRI	RCH	NHA	LVS	MAR	ATL	TEX	PHO	HOM	76th	106	
2006	Green Light Racing	07	Chevy	DAY	CAL	ATL	MAR	GTY	CLT	MFD	DOV; 28	TEX	MCH; 21	MLW	KAN	KEN	MEM	IRP	NSH	BRI	NHA	LVS	TAL	MAR	ATL	TEX	PHO	HOM	61st	179	
2007	Team Racing	86	Chevy	DAY	CAL	ATL	MAR	KAN	CLT	MFD	DOV	TEX	MCH; 36	MLW	MEM	KEN	IRP	NSH	BRI	GTW	NHA	LVS	TAL	MAR	ATL	TEX; 35	PHO	HOM; DNQ	113th	55	
2008	SS-Green Light Racing	0	Chevy	DAY	CAL	ATL	MAR	KAN	CLT	MFD	DOV	TEX	MCH	MLW	MEM	KEN	IRP	NSH	BRI	GTW	NHA	LVS	TAL	MAR	ATL	TEX	PHO	HOM; 36	114th	55	
2009	SS-Green Light Racing	08	Chevy	DAY	CAL	ATL	MAR	KAN	CLT	DOV; 33	TEX	MCH	MLW	MEM	KEN	IRP	NSH	BRI	CHI	IOW	GTW	NHA	LVS	MAR	TAL	TEX	PHO	HOM	105th	64	

^{*} Season still in progress
^{1} Ineligible for series points

=== ARCA Permatex SuperCar Series ===
(key) (Bold – Pole position awarded by qualifying time. Italics – Pole position earned by points standings or practice time. * – Most laps led.)

ARCA Permatex SuperCar Series results
Year	Team	No.	Make	1	2	3	4	5	6	7	8	9	10	11	12	13	14	15	16	APSC	Pts	Ref
1986	Info not available			ATL	DAY	ATL	TAL	SIR	SSP	FRS	KIL	CSP	TAL	BLN	ISF	DSF	TOL	OWO	ATL; DNQ	NA	-	
