= 2007 UAW-Ford 500 =

30th race of 2007 NASCAR Nextel Cup series

Race details
- Race 30 of 36 in the 2007 NASCAR Nextel Cup Series
- The 2007 UAW-Ford 500 program cover.
- Date: October 7, 2007
- Official name: UAW-Ford 500
- Location: Talladega Superspeedway, Talladega, Alabama
- Course: Permanent racing facility
- Course length: 2.66 miles (4.28 km)
- Distance: 188 laps, 500.08 mi (804.8 km)
- Weather: Hot with temperatures approaching 90 °F (32 °C); average wind speeds of 8.9 miles per hour (14.3 km/h)
- Average speed: 143.438 miles per hour (230.841 km/h)
- Attendance: 155,000

Pole position
Driver	Michael Waltrip	Michael Waltrip Racing
- Time: 50.648

Most laps led
Driver	Denny Hamlin	Joe Gibbs Racing
- Laps: 40

Winner
No. 24	Jeff Gordon	Hendrick Motorsports

Television in the United States
- Network: ABC
- Announcers: Jerry Punch, Andy Petree, Rusty Wallace
- Nielsen ratings: 4.6 (Final); 4.2 (Overnight); (7,347,000 viewers)

The 2007 UAW-Ford 500 was the 30th stock car race of the 2007 NASCAR Nextel Cup Series and the fourth in the ten-race season-ending Chase for the Nextel Cup. It was held on October 7, 2007, at Talladega Superspeedway in Talladega, Alabama, before a crowd of 155,000. Jeff Gordon of Hendrick Motorsports won the 188-lap race starting from 34th position. His teammate Jimmie Johnson finished second and Dave Blaney was third.

The event marked the debut of the Car of Tomorrow at a superspeedway, but it was heavily criticized for its lack of visibility, and drivers raised fears of becoming airborne if hit by another car. Michael Waltrip won the pole position by posting the fastest lap in qualifying but was passed by Blaney by the end of the first lap. The race lead changed 42 times, with Denny Hamlin leading the most laps out of any other driver (40). Johnson took the lead after driving on the outside lane on lap 183. Johnson led as the final lap began, but Gordon went to the outside of the track, and was bump-drafted by Tony Stewart, allowing him to claim his fifth victory of the season, his sixth at Talladega Superspeedway, the 80th of his career, and he surpassed Dale Earnhardt as the driver with the most restrictor plate wins, twelve.

The result advanced Gordon to the Drivers' Championship's lead, and his teammate Johnson (who led coming into the race) fell to second. The trio of Clint Bowyer, Tony Stewart, and Kevin Harvick retained third through fifth. Carl Edwards, Kurt Busch gained one position each, and Kyle Busch fell from fourth to eighth after being caught up in a multi-car accident. Chevrolet increased their unassailable lead in the Manufacturers' Championship, while Ford, Dodge and Toyota continued to occupy the remaining three places with six races left in the season.

== Background ==
Talladega Superspeedway, where the race was held.

The UAW-Ford 500 was the 30th of 36 scheduled stock car races of the 2007 NASCAR Nextel Cup Series and the fourth in the ten-race season-ending Chase for the Nextel Cup. It was held on October 7, 2007, at Talladega Superspeedway in Talladega, Alabama, a superspeedway that holds NASCAR races. The standard track at the speedway is a four-turn 2.66 mi (4.28 km) long superspeedway. The track's turns are banked at 33 degrees, while the front stretch, the location of the finish line, is banked at 16.5 degrees. The back stretch has a two-degree banking.

Before the race, Jimmie Johnson led the Drivers' Championship with 5,506 points, with teammate Jeff Gordon second and Clint Bowyer third. Tony Stewart and Kevin Harvick were fourth and fifth. Kyle Busch, Carl Edwards, Martin Truex Jr., Kurt Busch, Jeff Burton, Matt Kenseth and Denny Hamlin rounded out the top twelve drivers competing for the 2007 Chase for the Nextel Cup. Chevrolet led the Manufacturers' Championship with 232 points, sixty ahead of Ford in second. Dodge with 147 points was 56 ahead of Toyota in fourth. Brian Vickers was the race's defending champion.

The UAW-Ford 500 marked the début of the Car of Tomorrow on a superspeedway. Teams started by using a 31/32 inch restrictor plate which was expected to increase horsepower by 75 hp (56 kW) to 80 hp (60 kW). Furthermore, the wing angle was established at 10 degrees, and the wicker height was set at 1 in (25 mm) to add drag. Further changes were determined by the performance of the cars if they reached an average speed of more than 200 mph (320 km/h). NASCAR mandated teams to run flat side plates instead of the a curved side plate, and some cars had to make minor adjustments to pass pre-race inspection. Nextel Cup Series Director John Darby stated NASCAR changed the wording of the regulations to provide clarity and to have a starting point in controlling top speeds, "Basically, it says we're going to start out with this size of a restrictor plate, and if everything proves out OK, we'll leave it, but the ultimate restrictor-plate size won't be determined until the conclusion of final Cup practice." Drivers spent one and a half days in mid-September testing the Car of Tomorrow at the track.

There were two changes of driver heading into the race. It was announced that open-wheel driver Jacques Villeneuve would début in the No. 27 Bill Davis Racing car five weeks earlier than planned. Villeneuve planned to compete in the ARCA Re/Max and Craftsman Truck Series races at Talladega, but was granted approval to race in the Nextel Cup Series after testing of the Car of Tomorrow at the track. Villeneuve said he was delighted to make his debut in the Nextel Cup Series: "It's perfect. I'm really happy that NASCAR has given me its approval so quickly, and having run Talladega with the Cup drivers, I'm really looking forward to it. It's a huge step in my learning process." Mike Wallace replaced his younger brother Kenny Wallace in the No. 88 Robert Yates Racing car while the team's regular driver Ricky Rudd continued to recover from a shoulder injury.

== Practice and qualifying ==
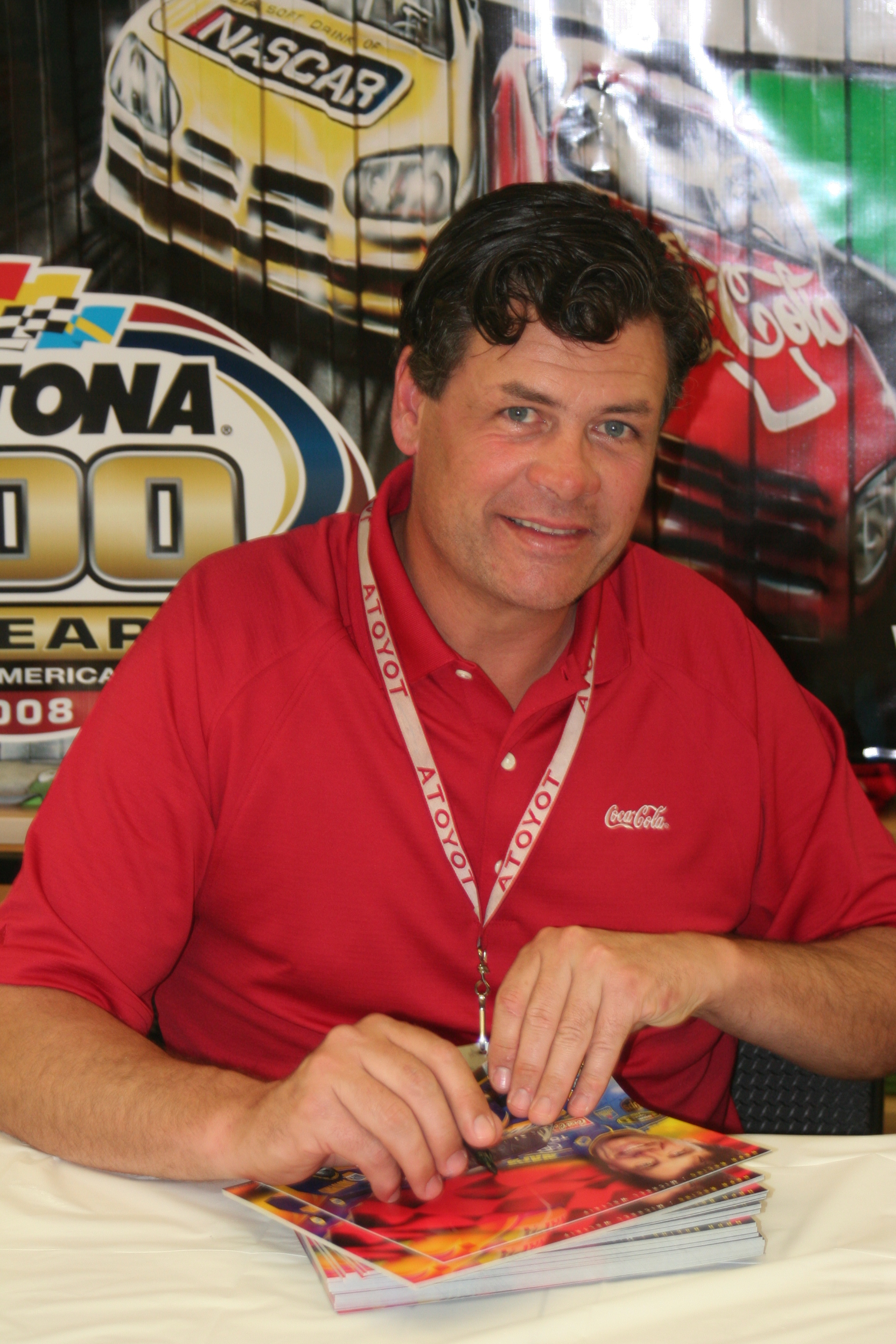
Michael Waltrip (pictured in 2008) had the fourth pole position of his career.

Two 60-minute practice sessions were held on the Friday before Sunday's race. Stewart set the fastest time in the first practice session with a lap of 49.118 seconds. Jeff Gordon was second-fastest. Positions three through ten were filled by Ken Schrader, Robby Gordon, Kyle Petty, Kasey Kahne, David Stremme, Martin Truex Jr., Greg Biffle, and Burton. Hamlin was forbidden by NASCAR to partake in its closing minutes because he was observed bump-drafting other cars. Darby explained that Hamlin was the most aggressive driver out of all those cautioned by NASCAR. Later that day, Stewart led the second practice session with a lap of 49.347 seconds; Paul Menard was 0.045 seconds slower in second. Kyle Busch, Kurt Busch, Jamie McMurray, Truex, Burton, Jeff Green, Tony Raines, and Johnny Sauter were in positions three through ten. After practice, drivers complained of hindered visibility at the front of the car, due to a larger cockpit and spoiler. They felt this had the potential to cause a multi-car accident, and were worried about the possibility of getting airborne if they were hit by other drivers.

Fifty-one cars were entered in the qualifier on Saturday afternoon, according to NASCAR's qualifying procedure, forty-three were allowed to race. Each driver ran two laps, with the starting order determined by the competitor's fastest times. Toyotas took five of the first six spots, as Michael Waltrip clinched the fourth pole position of his career, and his first since the 2005 Pocono 500, with a time of 50.648 seconds. He was joined on the grid's front row by Dave Blaney whose lap was 0.062 seconds slower. Vickers qualified in third. Fourth was Joe Nemechek, and David Reutimann fifth. The next three spots on the grid was composed of drivers who were required to qualify on time or risk missing the race: Villeneuve, John Andretti, and Bobby Labonte. Kahne and Elliott Sadler completed the top ten. Of the drivers in the chase, Stewart started 11th, Truex 13th, Hamlin 18th, and Johnson 19th. The eight drivers who failed to qualify were A. J. Allmendinger, Boris Said, Scott Riggs, Sam Hornish Jr., Jeremy Mayfield, Sterling Marlin, Ward Burton and Kevin Lepage. Kurt Busch and David Ragan's cars were found to be too low at the front during post-qualifying inspection, and were mandated to start at the back of the field. Afterward, Waltrip said, "I felt confident yesterday that we would make the race. Our qualifying lap was faster than what we ran in practice. If I only had to worry about my car, I would've been happier."

=== Qualifying results ===
Grid	No.	Driver	Team	Manufacturer	Time	Speed
1	55	Michael Waltrip	Michael Waltrip Racing	Toyota	50:648	189.070
2	22	Dave Blaney	Bill Davis Racing	Toyota	50:710	188.839
3	83	Brian Vickers	Red Bull Racing Team	Toyota	50.726	188.779
4	78	Joe Nemechek	Furniture Row Racing	Chevrolet	50.809	188.471
5	00	David Reutimann	Michael Waltrip Racing	Toyota	50.812	188.459
6	27	Jacques Villeneuve	Bill Davis Racing	Toyota	50.878	188.215
7	49	John Andretti	BAM Racing	Dodge	50.991	187.798
8	43	Bobby Labonte	Petty Enterprises	Dodge	51.131	187.284
9	9	Kasey Kahne	Evernham Motorsports	Dodge	51.138	187.258
10	19	Elliott Sadler	Evernham Motorsports	Dodge	51.176	187.119
11	20	Tony Stewart	Joe Gibbs Racing	Chevrolet	51.193	187.057
12	45	Kyle Petty	Petty Enterprises	Dodge	51.256	186.827
13	1	Martin Truex Jr.	Dale Earnhardt Inc.	Chevrolet	51.259	186.816
14	96	Tony Raines	Hall of Fame Racing	Chevrolet	51.274	186.761
15	88	Mike Wallace	Robert Yates Racing	Ford	51.293	186.692
16	12	Ryan Newman	Penske Racing South	Dodge	51.301	186.663
17	18	J. J. Yeley	Joe Gibbs Racing	Chevrolet	51.355	186.467
18	11	Denny Hamlin	Joe Gibbs Racing	Chevrolet	51.428	186.202
19	48	Jimmie Johnson	Hendrick Motorsports	Chevrolet	51.447	186.133
20	16	Greg Biffle	Roush Fenway Racing	Ford	51.480	186.014
21	31	Jeff Burton	Richard Childress Racing	Chevrolet	51.496	185.956
22	42	Juan Pablo Montoya	Chip Ganassi Racing	Dodge	51.501	185.938
23	07	Clint Bowyer	Richard Childress Racing	Chevrolet	51.532	185.826
24	7	Robby Gordon	Robby Gordon Motorsports	Ford	51.540	185.797
25	17	Matt Kenseth	Roush Fenway Racing	Ford	51.544	185.783
26	8	Dale Earnhardt Jr.	Dale Earnhardt Inc.	Chevrolet	51.544	185.783
27	38	David Gilliland	Robert Yates Racing	Ford	51.560	185.725
28	41	Reed Sorenson	Chip Ganassi Racing	Dodge	51.588	185.625
29	25	Casey Mears	Hendrick Motorsports	Chevrolet	51.611	185.542^{1}
30	15	Paul Menard	Dale Earnhardt Inc.	Chevrolet	51.633	185.463
31	99	Carl Edwards	Roush Fenway Racing	Ford	51.672	185.323
32	66	Jeff Green	Haas CNC Racing	Chevrolet	51.703	185.212
33	40	David Stremme	Chip Ganassi Racing	Dodge	51.745	185.061
34	24	Jeff Gordon	Hendrick Motorsports	Chevrolet	51.748	185.051^{2}
35	26	Jamie McMurray	Roush Fenway Racing	Ford	51.785	184.918^{1}^{2}
36	5	Kyle Busch	Hendrick Motorsports	Chevrolet	51.793	184.890^{2}
37	29	Kevin Harvick	Richard Childress Racing	Chevrolet	51.839	184.726^{2}
38	01	Aric Almirola	Dale Earnhardt Inc	Chevrolet	51.867	184.626^{2}
39	70	Johnny Sauter	Haas CNC Racing	Chevrolet	51.880	184.580^{2}
40	21	Ken Schrader	Wood Brothers Racing	Ford	51.989	184.193^{2}
41	2	Kurt Busch	Penske Racing South	Dodge	51.369	186.416^{2}^{3}
42	6	David Ragan	Roush Fenway Racing	Ford	51.691	185.255^{2}^{3}
43	44	Dale Jarrett	Michael Waltrip Racing	Toyota	51.029	187.658
Failed to qualify
44	84	A. J. Allmendinger	Red Bull Racing Team	Toyota	51.046	187.596
45	60	Boris Said	No Fear Racing	Ford	51.093	187.423
46	10	Scott Riggs	Evernham Motorsports	Dodge	51.119	187.328
47	06	Sam Hornish Jr.	Penske Racing South	Dodge	51.137	187.262
48	36	Jeremy Mayfield	Bill Davis Racing	Toyota	51.173	187.130
49	09	Sterling Marlin	Phoenix Racing	Chevrolet	51.292	186.696
50	4	Ward Burton	Morgan–McClure Motorsports	Chevrolet	51.494	185.963
51	37	Kevin Lepage	Front Row Motorsports	Dodge	51.549	185.765
^{1} Moved to the back of the field for changing engines (#26) and for adjusting his car (#25)
^{2} Grid position set by owner points
^{3} Driver was demoted positions for failing post-qualifying inspection

== Race ==
Live television coverage of the race on ABC began at 1:00 p.m. Eastern Daylight Time. Around the start of the race, weather conditions were mostly sunny with the air temperature at 89 °F (32 °C); a ten percent chance of rain was forecast. A moment of silence was held in honor of former NASCAR president Bill France Jr. Frank Stark of Raceway Ministries began pre-race ceremonies with an invocation. Miss University of Alabama Stephanie Shelton performed the national anthem, and Dave Sparks, an employee of the race's sponsor, commanded the drivers to start their engines. During the pace laps, McMurray moved to the rear of the field because he changed his engine, and Casey Mears did the same for illegal adjustments to his car.

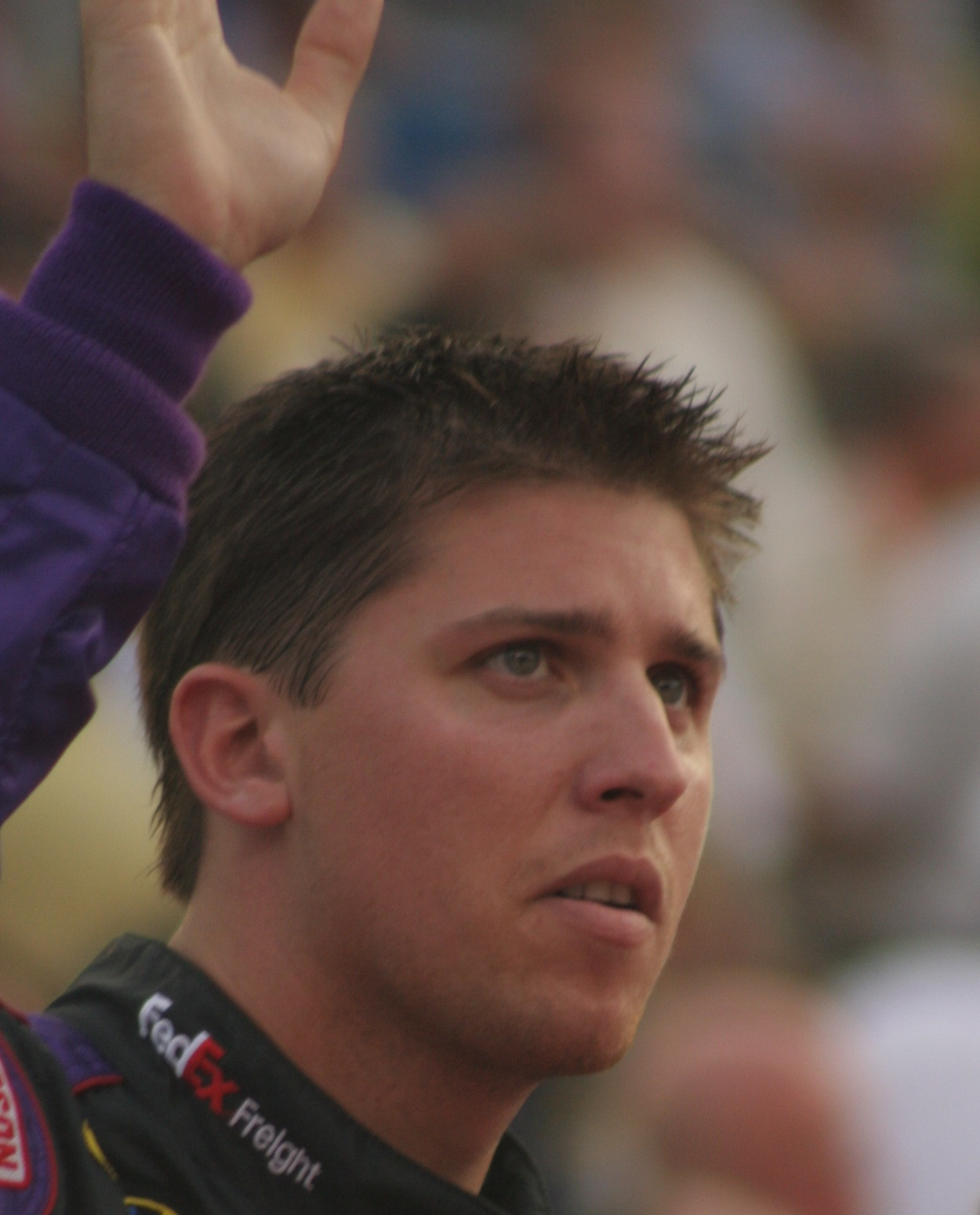
Denny Hamlin led more laps than any other driver, 40.

The race started at 2:21 p.m. Waltrip led the pack on the run to the first corner, but Blaney got ahead of him to take the first position at the end of the first lap. On lap two, Labonte made it three-abreast going to the finish line, and took the lead, before losing it to Vickers on the following lap. Waltrip steered right to reclaim first place on lap four, and held it for the next lap when Labonte returned to the head of the pack. The sixth lap had Robby Gordon pushed by other cars to become the new leader, which he retained until Vickers returned to the front on lap nine. In the meantime, Hamlin moved from eighteenth to fourth. He took the lead for the first time with assistance from Andretti on lap 12. The first caution was necessitated on lap 17 as Andretti's right-front tire blew, removing one of his car's fenders, and scattering debris on the track. Most of the leaders, including Hamlin, made pit stops for fuel, tires and car adjustments. Petty led the field for one lap before making his stop on the 20th lap, and Johnson was the leader on the next lap before doing the same.

Hamlin led the field back up to speed at the lap-22 restart, and was followed by Kahne, Truex, and Sadler. Three laps later, Harvick provided Sadler assistance to claim the lead on the left lane. However, Sadler lost the lead to Hamlin on lap 27, as some competitors created three-abreast racing by forming a middle lane. The outside lane was used by Truex to gain first place on lap 30. Dale Earnhardt Jr. moved to the lead on the 31st lap. He maintained it for the next 27 laps as the first round of green flag pit stops commenced. After the pit stops, Hamlin regained the lead. On lap 63, David Gilliland collided with Biffle at turn four, causing Biffle to spin sideways. Biffle's front-left tire went flat, and the front of Gilliland's vehicle sustained light damage. The second caution was waved to restore order. Some cars in the middle of the pack went down pit road to stop for fuel and tires. Gilliland's mechanics made repairs to his car. The race restarted on lap 67 as Hamlin led Stewart and Kyle Busch in a single file line.

Waltrip returned to the lead on lap 88, as Reutimann got into second by joining the pack of cars on the bottom line. Reutimann passed Waltrip for first on the following lap. On lap 91, Earnhardt led once again by driving on the outside lane. Two laps later, Jeff Burton's engine failed, laying oil and debris on the track, and calling for the race's third caution as he returned to pit road to retire. Pit stops for fuel and tires were made by several drivers during the caution. Waltrip led the restarted race on lap 96. He held it until Hamlin took it as the lead group of cars went three-abreast on lap 98. Stewart became the leader for the first time by driving on the outside lane one lap later. Three abreast-racing temporarily ended on lap 101, as the main pack of cars fell into a single line behind Stewart. Sadler took the lead with assistance from Kahne on the inside line on the 109th lap. Four laps later, Truex's engine blew, leaving oil on the track, and requiring a fourth caution.

Most drivers, including Sadler, elected to make pit stops for fuel and tires under the caution period. Bowyer and Sadler each led for one lap before making their pit stops. Sadler returned to the lead for the restart on lap 116 as the pack formed into one single file. On lap 132, Villeneuve scraped the wall alongside the track, but he continued without significant damage. Labonte received assistance from Stewart to move past Sadler for the lead on the 133rd lap. On the following lap, Stewart took the lead for himself. Vickers passed Stewart on the outside to claim the first position on lap 135. Lap 136 saw the race's fifth caution: Earnhardt's laid oil on the track after his engine failed. Dale Jarrett attempted to avoid other cars, but he sustained damage to the front-right corner of his car, stopping on the apron. Vickers and the rest of the leaders chose to make pit stops for fuel and tires while the caution was out. Sauter won the race off pit road, and led at the lap 140 restart. Jeff Gordon was required to drive down pit road as soon as the race resumed for a team equipment penalty in his pit stall.

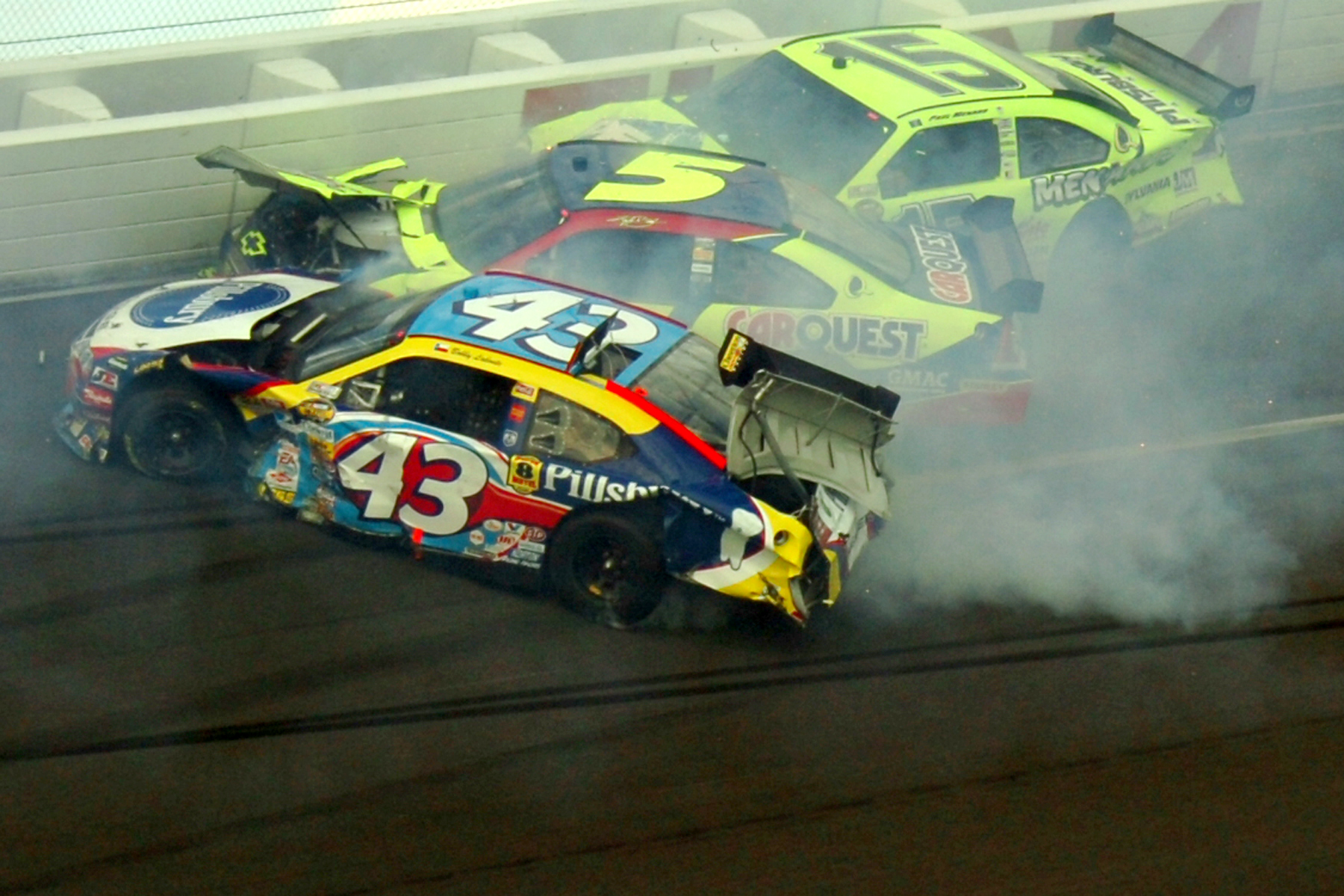
Labonte lost control on lap 145, causing a "Big One"

The main pack of cars again formed a single line as Stewart returned to first place on the 141st lap. On lap 145, a multi-car accident prompted the sixth caution. Labonte lost control of his car in turn four, and slid down into Kyle Busch. He then ricocheted into Robby Gordon, Reutimann slid as Ragan had no space to negotiate through and ran into him. Other drivers involved in the collision were McMurray, Kenseth, Menard, Stremme, Vickers and Hamlin. Most drivers, including Stewart, made pit stops for fuel to allow them to complete the race. Raines led the field at the restart on lap 150, On the next lap, Ryan Newman received assistance from his teammate Kurt Busch to take the lead. Stewart overtook Newman to retake first on lap 152. The seventh caution was waved one lap later for Schrader whose right-front tire blew, causing him to clout the turn four wall.

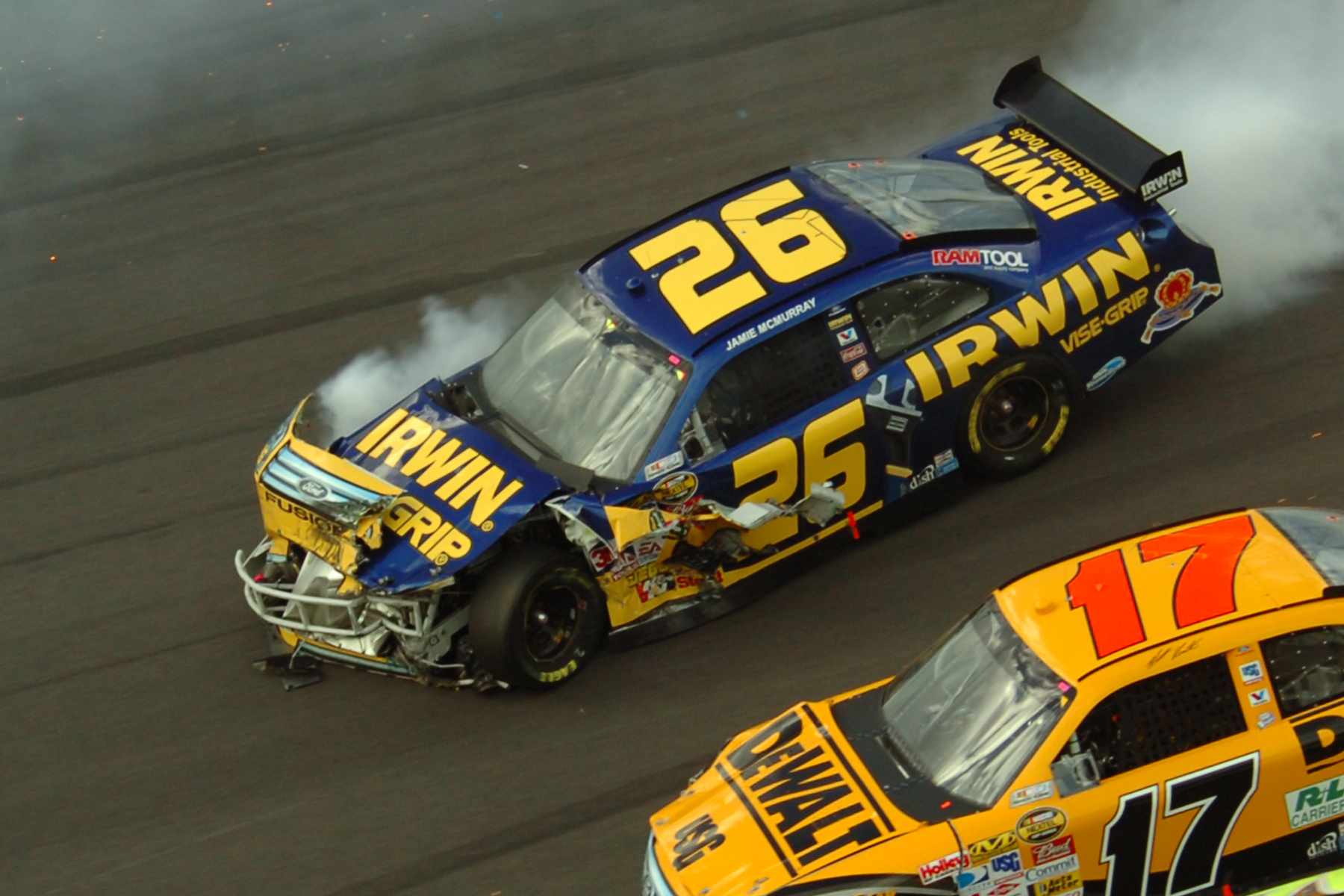
Jamie McMurray sliding up the racetrack, wrecking out of the event on lap 145.

Stewart kept the lead at the lap-156 restart. Another six laps passed until the eighth caution was called for, when Petty's tire blew and he crashed into the turn three wall. As with the previous restart, Stewart maintained the lead on lap 166. Blaney and Johnson formed a bottom line of around seven cars in an attempt to gain on Stewart. However, the top five of Stewart, Newman, Kurt Busch, Juan Pablo Montoya, and Kahne temporarily split from the rest of the pack by the 173rd lap. This was the case until the next lap when Stewart tried to block on both lanes, but Newman found a way past him to reclaim the lead. On lap 176, the ninth (and final) caution was waved as Waltrip's right-front tire blew in turn one. He clipped the rear of Sadler's car, and then clouted a wall; Sadler spun and collected Biffle and Raines. Newman led the field at the restart on lap 180 with Busch second and Montoya third. Stewart turned onto the bottom lane so he could try and establish a second line of cars This proved successful as the Hendrick Motorsports duo of Johnson and Jeff Gordon were on the bottom lane, and caught Newman on the 182nd lap.

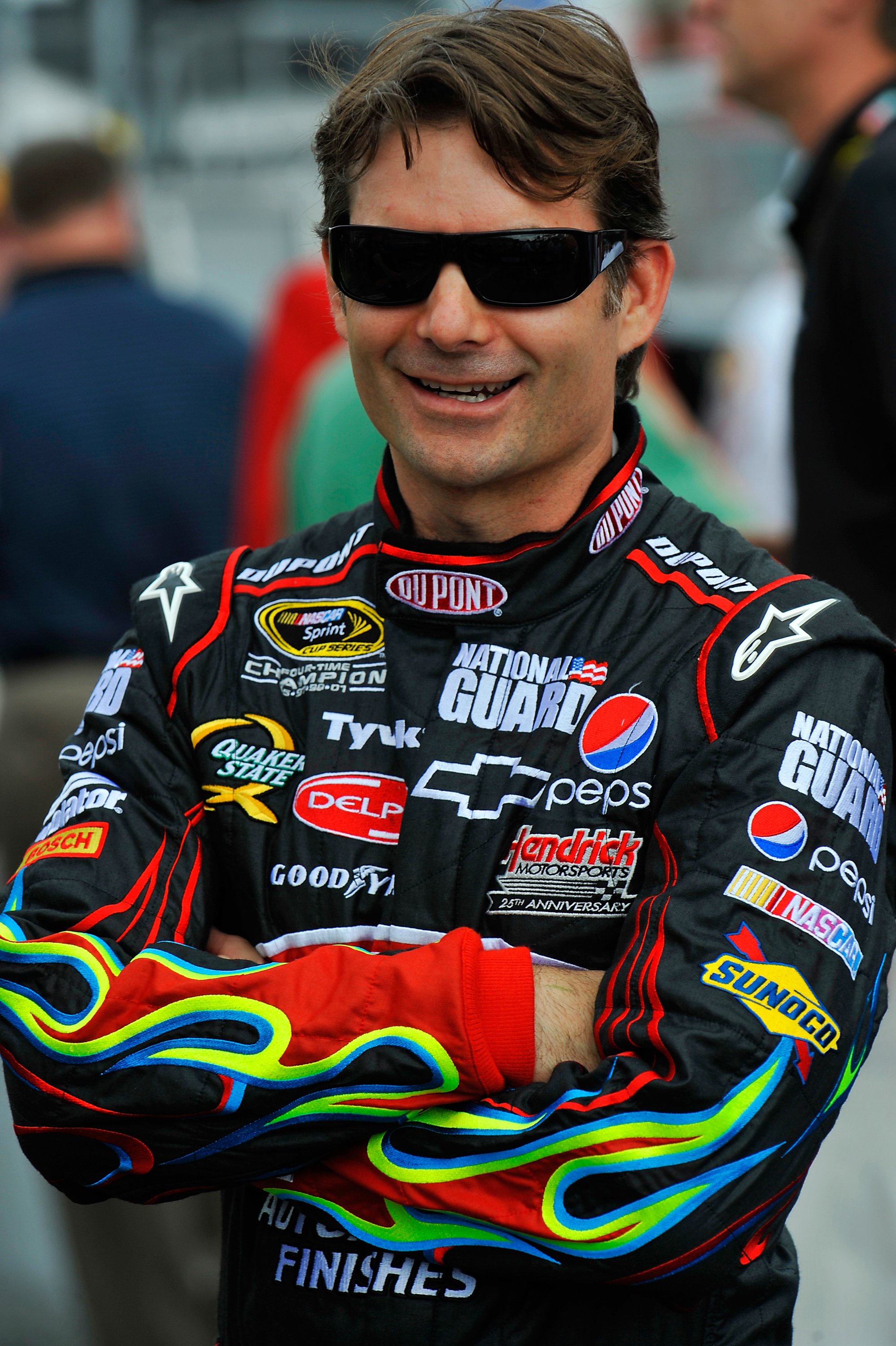
Jeff Gordon (pictured in 2009) led the final lap of the race to claim his fifth victory of the season and the 80th of his career.

Newman lost the lead to Johnson on the following lap. Stewart tried to pass Johnson on lap 184, but could not do so as no other driver steered to the middle lane to provide him with assistance. The right lane had Newman and his teammate Kurt Busch driving on it. The two caught Johnson and his teammate Jeff Gordon on the 185th lap. Stewart linked up with Busch and Newman the lap after, and went to the outside with Jeff Gordon and Johnson remaining on the inside. On the final lap, Jeff Gordon turned right, and got in between his teammate Johnson and Newman and Kurt Busch. As Johnson went to block his teammate, Stewart bump-drafted Jeff Gordon to give the latter the lead, which he held to clinch his fifth victory of the season, the 80th of his career, and a season sweep of victories at Talladega Superspeedway. He also took his sixth win at Talladega Superspeedway, and surpassed Dale Earnhardt to become the new all-time wins leader at restrictor-plate tracks with twelve. Johnson finished second, with Blaney third, Hamlin fourth and Newman fifth. Mears, Kurt Busch, Stewart, Raines and Reed Sorenson completed the top ten. The race had a total of nine cautions and 42 lead changes by 22 different drivers. Hamlin led five times for a total of 40 laps, more than any other competitor.

=== Post-race comments ===
Jeff Gordon appeared in Victory Lane after his victory lap to celebrate his fifth win of the season in front of the crowd of 155,000 people; the win earned him $246,036. He called it "the hardest three-quarters of a race that I've ever had to run before," after qualifying was influential in determining his strategy for the race, "We avoided the wrecks and all of a sudden found ourselves in the top 15 with about 25–30 to go, and we held on there. What I don't understand is how I got by my teammate. I got a couple of pushes. When it got three-wide, I thought, 'This is my opportunity.' Luckily when I got high, and Jimmie tried to block me, the 20 was there and had nowhere to go. He's the one who pushed me to the front." Johnson said his second-place finish was not something he was happy with since he was passed by his teammate, "To get that close and not win is a letdown. There must have been stuff going on behind me that I couldn't see, but Jeff could in his mirror, and he pulled up and got in front of the 20 [Stewart] and was able to take advantage of that push." Third-placed Blaney revealed his team's objective was to preserve his car and return to the top 35 in points, "I didn't want to do anything to put it in harm's way. I was way more cautious than I probably wanted to be. I just got with the right group of cars there at the end."

Reaction to the Car of Tomorrow's debut at a superspeedway was negative. Newman stated his feeling that the racing "not very good" as he observed the single file driving, which he felt was not racing to him, "I hope it wasn't what NASCAR intended with this car. I'm not complaining about the car because the old car did relatively the same thing. We gotta do something where we can race a little bit. I mean I was driving around with one hand running 15th just riding, on and off the gas. It's not racing. If we're going to do that why don't we just make it a 100-mile race and we'll tear them all up in the first 50?" Jeff Gordon spoke of how boredom affected him during the race, and called for more work on the car to prevent single-file racing, "I think we would never race like that if we didn't have the closing rate that we have, and [with] the bump-drafting being so drastic that I think we need to make some adjustments here." Kenseth said his strategy was to run at the rear of the pack, and believed spectators did not want to see that, adding, "We rode around for about 350–400 miles and then sooner or later you've got to go race and try to get a partner up there and see how your car is gonna handle. When we decided to go up there, we got up to the third or fourth row on the inside and then the leader wrecked. When the leader wrecks, there's not a whole lot you can do to miss it."

Two days after the race, Chip Ganassi Racing was given penalties for Sorenson's car. The penalties for "actions detrimental to stock car racing"; "car, car parts, components and/or equipment used do not conform to NASCAR rules" and for the front of the car failing to meet the minimum ride height restrictions as imposed by the regulations for the Car of Tomorrow during post-race inspection, included a $25,000 fine for crew chief Jimmy Elledge, who was placed on probation until December 31, 2007. Team owner Chip Ganassi and Sorenson were penalized 25 points in the Owners and Drivers' Championships. The result gave Jeff Gordon a six-point lead over teammate Johnson in the Drivers' Championship. Bowyer, Stewart and Harvick stayed in positions third through fifth. Edwards and Kurt Busch advanced to sixth and seventh, while Kyle Busch, Hamlin, and Truex completed out the top ten placings. In the Manufacturers' Championship, Chevrolet (with 271 points) increased its unassailable lead. Ford maintained second with 175 points, Dodge stayed in third with 149 points, and Toyota retained fourth with 97 points with six races left in the season. The race took three hours, 29 minutes and 11 seconds to complete, and the margin of victory was 0.066 seconds.

=== Race results ===
Pos.	Grid	No.	Driver	Team	Manufacturer	Laps	Points
1	34	24	Jeff Gordon	Hendrick Motorsports	Chevrolet	188	190^{1}
2	19	48	Jimmie Johnson	Hendrick Motorsports	Chevrolet	188	175^{1}
3	2	22	Dave Blaney	Bill Davis Racing	Toyota	188	170^{1}
4	18	11	Denny Hamlin	Joe Gibbs Racing	Chevrolet	188	170^{2}
5	16	12	Ryan Newman	Penske Racing South	Dodge	188	160^{1}
6	29	25	Casey Mears	Hendrick Motorsports	Chevrolet	188	150
7	41	2	Kurt Busch	Penske Racing South	Dodge	188	146
8	11	20	Tony Stewart	Joe Gibbs Racing	Chevrolet	188	147^{1}
9	14	96	Tony Raines	Hall of Fame Racing	Chevrolet	188	143^{1}
10	28	41	Reed Sorenson	Chip Ganassi Racing	Dodge	188	109^{3}
11	23	07	Clint Bowyer	Richard Childress Racing	Chevrolet	188	135^{1}
12	39	70	Johnny Sauter	Haas CNC Racing	Chevrolet	188	132^{1}
13	32	66	Jeff Green	Haas CNC Racing	Chevrolet	188	129^{1}
14	31	99	Carl Edwards	Roush Fenway Racing	Ford	188	121
15	22	42	Juan Pablo Montoya	Chip Ganassi Racing	Dodge	188	118
16	9	9	Kasey Kahne	Evernham Motorsports	Dodge	188	115
17	33	40	David Stremme	Chip Ganassi Racing	Dodge	188	117^{1}
18	17	18	J. J. Yeley	Joe Gibbs Racing	Chevrolet	188	109
19	15	88	Mike Wallace	Robert Yates Racing	Ford	188	106
20	37	29	Kevin Harvick	Richard Childress Racing	Chevrolet	188	103^{1}
21	6	27	Jacques Villeneuve	Bill Davis Racing	Toyota	188	100
22	5	00	David Reutimann	Michael Waltrip Racing	Toyota	179	102^{1}
23	20	16	Greg Biffle	Roush Fenway Racing	Ford	176	94
24	10	19	Elliott Sadler	Evernham Motorsports	Dodge	175	96^{1}
25	1	55	Michael Waltrip	Michael Waltrip Racing	Toyota	175	93^{1}
26	25	17	Matt Kenseth	Roush Fenway Racing	Ford	171	85
27	27	38	David Gilliland	Robert Yates Racing	Ford	167	82
28	12	45	Kyle Petty	Petty Enterprises	Dodge	161	84^{1}
29	24	7	Robby Gordon	Robby Gordon Motorsports	Ford	161	81^{1}
30	38	01	Aric Almirola	Dale Earnhardt Inc.	Chevrolet	156	73
31	40	21	Ken Schrader	Wood Brothers Racing	Ford	152	70
32	4	78	Joe Nemechek	NEMCO Motorsports	Chevrolet	149	67
33	7	49	John Andretti	BAM Racing	Dodge	149	64
34	42	6	David Ragan	Roush Fenway Racing	Ford	146	61
35	8	43	Bobby Labonte	Petty Enterprises	Dodge	144	58^{1}
36	36	5	Kyle Busch	Hendrick Motorsports	Chevrolet	144	60^{1}
37	35	26	Jamie McMurray	Roush Fenway Racing	Ford	144	52
38	30	15	Paul Menard	Dale Earnhardt Inc.	Chevrolet	144	49
39	3	83	Brian Vickers	Red Bull Racing Team	Toyota	144	51^{1}
40	26	8	Dale Earnhardt Jr.	Dale Earnhardt Inc.	Chevrolet	136	48^{1}
41	43	44	Dale Jarrett	Michael Waltrip Racing	Toyota	136	40
42	13	1	Martin Truex Jr.	Dale Earnhardt Inc.	Chevrolet	113	42^{1}
43	21	31	Jeff Burton	Richard Childress Racing	Chevrolet	91	34
^{1} Includes five bonus points for leading a lap
^{2} Includes ten bonus points for leading the most laps
^{3} Includes a 25-point post-race penalty

== Standings after the race ==
Drivers' Championship standings

Pos	+/–	Driver	Points
1	1	Jeff Gordon	5,690
2	1	Jimmie Johnson	5,681 (−9)
3		Clint Bowyer	5,627 (−63)
4		Tony Stewart	5,536 (−152)
5		Kevin Harvick	5,488 (−202)
6	1	Carl Edwards	5,485 (−205)
7	1	Kurt Busch	5,475 (−215)
8	2	Kyle Busch	5,430 (−260)
9	3	Denny Hamlin	5,428 (−262)
10	2	Martin Truex Jr.	5,390 (−300)
11		Matt Kenseth	5,372 (−318)
12	2	Jeff Burton	5,354 (−336)

Manufacturers' Championship standings

Pos	+/–	Manufacturer	Points
1		Chevrolet	271
2		Ford	175 (−94)
3		Dodge	149 (−122)
4		Toyota	97 (−174)

- Note: Only the top twelve positions are included for the driver standings. These drivers qualified for the Chase for the Nextel Cup.

Previous race: 2007 LifeLock 400	Nextel Cup Series; 2007 season	Next race: 2007 Bank of America 500
