= 2008 Aaron's 312 =

Race details
- Map of Speedway
- Date: April 26, 2008
- Official name: 2008 Aaron's 312
- Location: Talladega Superspeedway in Lincoln, Alabama
- Course: Superspeedway
- Course length: 2.66 miles (4.28 km)
- Distance: 117 laps, 311.2 mi (500.83 km)
- Weather: Cloudy
- Average speed: 133.111 mph (214.221 km/h)
- Attendance: 80,000

Pole position
Driver	Tony Stewart	Joe Gibbs Racing
- Time: 51.676

Most laps led
Driver	Tony Stewart	Joe Gibbs Racing
- Laps: 81

Winner
No. 20	Tony Stewart	Joe Gibbs Racing

Television in the United States
- Network: ABC
- Announcers: Jerry Punch, Andy Petree, Dale Jarrett

The 2008 Aaron's 312 was a NASCAR Nationwide Series race held at Talladega Superspeedway in Lincoln, Alabama, on April 26, 2008. The race was the 17th iteration of the event. Tony Stewart dominated the race. Stewart won the pole, led the most laps, and won the race, his first career victory at Talladega. But the race was mostly remembered by two crashes. One being a crash by Dario Franchitti that left him with a fractured ankle. And the second one being the most infamous one when Kevin Lepage pulled up right in front of the field going about 150 miles per hour (240 km/h) slower after coming off pit road and causing the big one while he did not take responsibility for his mistake, an incident later nicknamed as "Lepaging the field".

== Background ==
Talladega Superspeedway, the race track where the race was held.

Talladega Superspeedway is one of six superspeedways to hold NASCAR races; the others are Daytona International Speedway, Auto Club Speedway, Indianapolis Motor Speedway, Pocono Raceway and Michigan International Speedway. The standard track layout is a four-turn superspeedway that is 2.66 miles (4.28 km) long. The track's turns are banked at thirty-three degrees, while the front stretch, the location of the finish line, is banked at 16.5 degrees. The back stretch has a two-degree banking. Talladega Superspeedway can seat up to 143,231 people.

=== Entry list ===
- (R) denotes rookie driver

#	Driver	Team	Make
0	Dwayne Leik	JD Motorsports	Chevrolet
01	Kertus Davis	JD Motorsports	Chevrolet
1	Mike Bliss	Phoenix Racing	Chevrolet
2	Clint Bowyer	Richard Childress Racing	Chevrolet
4	Robert Richardson Jr.	Jay Robinson Racing	Chevrolet
05	Brett Rowe	Day Enterprise Racing	Chevrolet
5	Dale Earnhardt Jr.	JR Motorsports	Chevrolet
6	David Ragan	Roush Fenway Racing	Ford
7	Mike Wallace	Germain Racing	Toyota
9	Patrick Carpentier	Gillett Evernham Motorsports	Dodge
11	Jason Keller	CJM Racing	Chevrolet
16	Greg Biffle	Roush Fenway Racing	Ford
18	Kyle Busch	Joe Gibbs Racing	Toyota
20	Tony Stewart	Joe Gibbs Racing	Toyota
21	Stephen Leicht	Richard Childress Racing	Chevrolet
22	Reed Sorenson	Fitz Motorsports	Dodge
24	Eric McClure	Front Row Motorsports	Chevrolet
25	Bobby Hamilton Jr.	Team Rensi Motorsports	Ford
27	Brad Coleman	Baker Curb Racing	Ford
28	Kenny Wallace	Jay Robinson Racing	Chevrolet
29	Scott Wimmer	Richard Childress Racing	Chevrolet
32	Denny Hamlin	Braun Racing	Toyota
33	Cale Gale (R)	Kevin Harvick Inc.	Chevrolet
38	Jason Leffler	Braun Racing	Toyota
40	Dario Franchitti (R)	Chip Ganassi Racing	Dodge
41	Kyle Krisiloff	Chip Ganassi Racing	Dodge
47	Kelly Bires	JTG Daugherty Racing	Ford
52	Donnie Neuenberger	Means Racing	Chevrolet
57	Justin Ashburn	Beahr Racing Enterprises	Dodge
59	Marcos Ambrose	JTG Daugherty Racing	Ford
60	Carl Edwards	Roush Fenway Racing	Ford
61	Kevin Lepage	Specialty Racing	Ford
64	David Stremme	Rusty Wallace Racing	Chevrolet
66	Steve Wallace	Rusty Wallace Racing	Chevrolet
70	Mark Green	ML Motorsports	Chevrolet
75	Johnny Sauter	Bob Schacht Motorsports	Chevrolet
81	D. J. Kennington	MacDonald Motorsports	Dodge
84	Mike Harmon	Elite 2 Racing	Chevrolet
88	Brad Keselowski	JR Motorsports	Chevrolet
89	Morgan Shepherd	Faith Motorsports	Dodge
90	Johnny Chapman	MSRP Motorsports	Chevrolet
91	Larry Gunselman	MSRP Motorsports	Ford
99	David Reutimann	Michael Waltrip Racing	Toyota
Official Entry List

== Qualifying ==
Tony Stewart won the pole with a time of 51.676 and a speed of 185.308 mph.

Grid	No.	Driver	Team	Manufacturer	Time	Speed
1	20	Tony Stewart	Joe Gibbs Racing	Toyota	51.676	185.308
2	1	Mike Bliss	Phoenix Racing	Chevrolet	51.745	185.061
3	38	Jason Leffler	Braun Racing	Toyota	51.768	184.979
4	40	Dario Franchitti (R)	Chip Ganassi Racing	Dodge	51.809	184.833
5	88	Brad Keselowski	JR Motorsports	Chevrolet	51.917	184.448
6	2	Clint Bowyer	Richard Childress Racing	Chevrolet	51.944	184.352
7	5	Dale Earnhardt Jr.	JR Motorsports	Chevrolet	51.958	184.303
8	18	Kyle Busch	Joe Gibbs Racing	Toyota	51.969	184.264
9	33	Cale Gale (R)	Kevin Harvick Inc.	Chevrolet	51.984	184.211
10	32	Denny Hamlin	Braun Racing	Toyota	51.984	184.211
11	60	Carl Edwards	Roush Fenway Racing	Ford	52.002	184.147
12	9	Patrick Carpentier	Gillett Evernham Motorsports	Dodge	52.086	183.850
13	21	Stephen Leicht	Richard Childress Racing	Chevrolet	52.150	183.624
14	41	Kyle Krisiloff	Chip Ganassi Racing	Dodge	52.237	183.318
15	16	Greg Biffle	Roush Fenway Racing	Ford	52.242	183.301
16	27	Brad Coleman	Baker Curb Racing	Ford	52.246	183.287
17	81	D. J. Kennington	MacDonald Motorsports	Dodge	52.258	183.245
18	47	Kelly Bires	JTG Daugherty Racing	Ford	52.266	183.217
19	29	Scott Wimmer	Richard Childress Racing	Chevrolet	52.322	183.021
20	7	Mike Wallace	Germain Racing	Toyota	52.333	182.982
21	6	David Ragan	Roush Fenway Racing	Ford	52.442	182.602
22	75	Johnny Sauter*	Bob Schacht Motorsports	Chevrolet	52.452	182.567
23	01	Kertus Davis	JD Motorsports	Chevrolet	52.455	182.556
24	64	David Stremme	Rusty Wallace Racing	Chevrolet	52.552	182.220
25	66	Steve Wallace	Rusty Wallace Racing	Chevrolet	52.612	182.012
26	70	Mark Green	ML Motorsports	Chevrolet	52.694	181.728
27	99	David Reutimann	Michael Waltrip Racing	Toyota	52.732	181.598
28	28	Kenny Wallace	Jay Robinson Racing	Chevrolet	52.762	181.494
29	24	Eric McClure	Front Row Motorsports	Chevrolet	52.795	181.381
30	59	Marcos Ambrose	JTG Daugherty Racing	Ford	52.818	181.302
31	0	Dwayne Leik	JD Motorsports	Chevrolet	52.824	181.281
32	22	Reed Sorenson	Fitz Motorsports	Dodge	52.828	181.268
33	89	Morgan Shepherd	Faith Motorsports	Dodge	52.938	180.891
34	91	Larry Gunselman	MSRP Motorsports	Ford	52.950	180.850
35	11	Jason Keller	CJM Racing	Chevrolet	52.954	180.836
36	25	Bobby Hamilton Jr.	Team Rensi Motorsports	Ford	52.960	180.816
37	4	Robert Richardson Jr.	Jay Robinson Racing	Chevrolet	53.081	180.404
38	61	Kevin Lepage	Specialty Racing	Ford	53.157	180.146
39	52	Donnie Neuenberger	Means Racing	Chevrolet	53.312	179.622
40	05	Brett Rowe	Day Enterprise Racing	Chevrolet	53.371	179.423
41	90	Johnny Chapman	MSRP Motorsports	Chevrolet	53.560	178.790
42	57	Justin Ashburn	Beahr Racing Enterprises	Dodge	54.732	174.962
43	84	Mike Harmon*	Elite 2 Racing	Chevrolet	—	—
Official Starting grid

* - Johnny Sauter and Mike Harmon both had to start at the rear of the field due to missing the drivers meeting.

== Race ==
Pole sitter Tony Stewart led the first lap of the race. On lap 7, Brad Keselowski took the lead from Stewart. On lap 10, Stephen Leicht took the lead from Keselowski for a moment before Keselowski immeadietly took it back. On lap 11, the first caution flew for a hard four car crash in turn 3. Dario Franchitti was running in the midst of the top 10 when his right rear tire went flat going into turn 3. Franchitti spun in turn 3 while Clint Bowyer hit the outside wall trying to avoid Franchitti but ended up making contact with David Ragan sending Bowyer into the outside wall and Johnny Sauter spun trying to avoid Franchitti. Franchitti's car backed into the outside wall and spun back down across the track where he was t-boned in the driver's side at over 100 mph by Larry Gunselman. Franchitti climbed out and had to be helped over to a stretcher near an ambulance. Both Franchitti and Gunselman were taken to a nearby hospital for further evaluation. Gunselman was fine but Franchitti had suffered a minor fracture in his left ankle. Franchitti was scheduled to drive in the Cup Series race the following day but was unable to and was replaced by David Stremme. Franchitti would be able to return to racing about a month later in the Nationwide Series race at Dover. Brad Keselowski led the field to the restart on lap 17. On lap 18, Jason Leffler took the lead. On lap 19, Keselowski tried to take the lead from Leffler and led that lap before the second caution flew on lap 20 when Scott Wimmer blew a right front tire in turn 1 and hit the outside wall. Leffler was in the lead when the caution flew and he led the field to the restart on lap 25. On lap 26, Tony Stewart took the lead from Leffler. On lap 40, Brad Coleman took the lead from Stewart with a push from Denny Hamlin. But on the next lap, Stewart would take the lead back. On lap 43, the third caution flew when Eric McClure spun on the frontstretch off of turn 4. Tony Stewart won the race off of pit road and he led the field to the restart on lap 47. On lap 50, Dale Earnhardt Jr. took the lead with a push from Reed Sorenson. On lap 63, the fourth caution flew when David Ragan spun on the backstretch after contact with Reed Sorenson.

=== The Big One ===
Tony Stewart was first off pit road and led the field to the restart with 51 laps left. With 47 laps to go, a major crash happened in turn 1; Kevin Lepage had just made a pit stop and rejoined the track as the pack was speeding through the tri-oval. Instead of staying below the yellow line until he reached a safe speed, Lepage merged directly onto the track in front of more than 20 cars going nearly 190 miles per hour. A few drivers were able to avoid him, but others couldn't; Mike Wallace swerved at the last moment to miss Lepage and ended up turning David Reutimann. Carl Edwards, who was behind Wallace, hit the back of Lepage's car head-on, causing Edwards' car to bounce and destroy the rear of Lepage's car, triggering the massive wreck. A total of 16 cars were involved, including Mike Wallace, Patrick Carpentier, Jason Keller, Kyle Busch, Stephen Leicht, Reed Sorenson, Kenny Wallace, Cale Gale, Kyle Krisiloff, Kelly Bires, Marcos Ambrose, Carl Edwards, Kevin Lepage, Steve Wallace, Brad Keselowski, and David Reutimann. The red flag stopped the race for about 25 minutes. At first, Lepage blamed the spotters of the other cars, saying they should have seen him coming onto the track. He said, "If they couldn't see me coming out of the pits with this red and yellow race car, then maybe they need to get new spotters." Two days later, Lepage apologized and accepted full responsibility for causing the crash.

=== Final laps ===
Tony Stewart won the race off of pit road and he led the field to the restart with 43 laps to go. With 29 to go, the 6th caution flew for a three car crash in turn 1. It started when D. J. Kennington got loose and spun and collected Brett Rowe and Brad Coleman. Stewart led the field to the restart with 24 to go. With 19 to go, the 7th caution flew for debris. The race restarted with 15 laps to go. With 13 to go, Mike Wallace attempted to take the lead from Stewart but was unable to make it stick. Stewart held off the pack but the 8th and final caution would fly with just 5 laps to go for debris. The wreck would set up a two lap shootout. On the final lap, Stewart got far ahead of the pack but the pack would quickly catch him and Dale Earnhardt Jr. would get to Stewart's outside on the backstretch. But Junior couldn't make it stick and Tony Stewart would hold off the pack and win the race. The win would be Stewart's first at Talladega in his career. David Stremme, Bobby Hamilton Jr., Jason Leffler, and Mark Green would round out the top 5 while Dale Earnhardt Jr., Mike Bliss, Patrick Carpentier, Scott Wimmer, and Mike Wallace rounded out the top 10.

== Race results ==
Pos	Car	Driver	Team	Manufacturer	Laps Run	Laps Led	Status	Points
1	20	Tony Stewart	Joe Gibbs Racing	Toyota	117	81	running	195
2	64	David Stremme	Rusty Wallace Racing	Chevrolet	117	0	running	170
3	25	Bobby Hamilton Jr.	Team Rensi Motorsports	Ford	117	0	running	165
4	38	Jason Leffler	Braun Racing	Toyota	117	7	running	165
5	70	Mark Green	ML Motorsports	Chevrolet	117	0	running	155
6	5	Dale Earnhardt Jr.	JR Motorsports	Chevrolet	117	14	running	155
7	1	Mike Bliss	Phoenix Racing	Chevrolet	117	0	running	146
8	9	Patrick Carpentier	Gillett Evernham Motorsports	Dodge	117	0	running	142
9	29	Scott Wimmer	Richard Childress Racing	Chevrolet	117	0	running	138
10	7	Mike Wallace	Germain Racing	Toyota	117	0	running	134
11	16	Greg Biffle	Roush Fenway Racing	Ford	117	0	running	130
12	01	Kertus Davis	JD Motorsports	Chevrolet	117	0	running	127
13	89	Morgan Shepherd	Faith Motorsports	Dodge	117	1	running	129
14	52	Donnie Neuenberger	Means Racing	Chevrolet	116	0	running	121
15	24	Eric McClure	Front Row Motorsports	Chevrolet	114	0	running	118
16	18	Kyle Busch	Joe Gibbs Racing	Toyota	114	0	running	115
17	84	Mike Harmon	Elite 2 Racing	Chevrolet	113	0	running	112
18	6	David Ragan	Roush Fenway Racing	Ford	111	0	running	109
19	4	Robert Richardson Jr.	Jay Robinson Racing	Chevrolet	108	1	overheating	111
20	99	David Reutimann	Michael Waltrip Racing	Toyota	105	0	running	103
21	11	Jason Keller	RJM Racing	Chevrolet	103	0	running	100
22	33	Cale Gale (R)	Kevin Harvick Inc.	Chevrolet	101	0	crash	97
23	88	Brad Keselowski	JR Motorsports	Chevrolet	97	9	running	99
24	27	Brad Coleman	Baker Curb Racing	Ford	95	1	crash	96
25	2	Clint Bowyer	Richard Childress Racing	Chevrolet	93	0	running	88
26	81	D. J. Kennington	MacDonald Motorsports	Dodge	88	0	crash	85
27	05	Brett Rowe	Day Enterprise Racing	Chevrolet	88	0	crash	82
28	59	Marcos Ambrose	JTG Daugherty Racing	Ford	81	0	running	79
29	22	Reed Sorenson	Fitz Motorsports	Dodge	76	1	crash	81
30	28	Kenny Wallace	Jay Robinson Racing	Chevrolet	75	0	crash	73
31	60	Carl Edwards	Roush Fenway Racing	Ford	70	0	crash	70
32	66	Steve Wallace	Rusty Wallace Racing	Chevrolet	70	0	crash	67
33	41	Kyle Krisiloff	Chip Ganassi Racing	Dodge	70	0	crash	64
34	21	Stephen Leicht	Richard Childress Racing	Chevrolet	70	0	crash	61
35	61	Kevin Lepage	Specialty Racing	Ford	69	0	crash	58
36	47	Kelly Bires	JTG Daugherty Racing	Ford	69	0	crash	55
37	32	Denny Hamlin	Braun Racing	Toyota	47	0	engine	52
38	57	Justin Ashburn	Beahr Racing Enterprises	Dodge	35	0	rear end	49
39	90	Johnny Chapman	MSRP Motorsports	Chevrolet	29	0	transmission	46
40	0	Dwayne Leik	JD Motorsports	Chevrolet	24	2	transmission	48
41	40	Dario Franchitti (R)	Chip Ganassi Racing	Dodge	10	0	crash	40
42	75	Johnny Sauter	Bob Schacht Motorsports	Chevrolet	10	0	ignition	37
43	91	Larry Gunselman	MSRP Motorsports	Ford	10	0	crash	34
Official Race results

Previous race: 2008 Corona Mexico 200	NASCAR Nationwide Series; 2008 season	Next race: 2008 Lipton Tea 250
