= 2000 Brickyard 400 =

Race details
- Race 20 of 34 in the 2000 NASCAR Winston Cup Series
- 2000 Brickyard 400 program cover
- Date: August 5, 2000
- Official name: Brickyard 400
- Location: Indianapolis Motor Speedway; Speedway, Indiana
- Course: Permanent racing facility
- Course length: 2.5 miles (4.023 km)
- Distance: 160 laps, 400 mi (643.738 km)
- Average speed: 155.912 miles per hour (250.916 km/h)

Pole position
| Driver | Ricky Rudd | Robert Yates Racing |
- Time: 49.705

Most laps led
| Driver | Rusty Wallace | Penske-Kranefuss Racing |
- Laps: 110

Winner
| No. 18 | Bobby Labonte | Joe Gibbs Racing |

Television in the United States
- Network: ABC
- Announcers: Bob Jenkins, Benny Parsons, Ray Evernham
- Nielsen ratings: 3.7/10

The 2000 Brickyard 400, the 7th running of the event, was a NASCAR Winston Cup Series race held on August 5, 2000, at Indianapolis Motor Speedway in Speedway, Indiana. Contested over 160 laps on the 2.5-mile (4.0-kilometre) speedway, it was the 20th race of the 2000 NASCAR Winston Cup Series season. Bobby Labonte of Joe Gibbs Racing won the race.

== Background ==
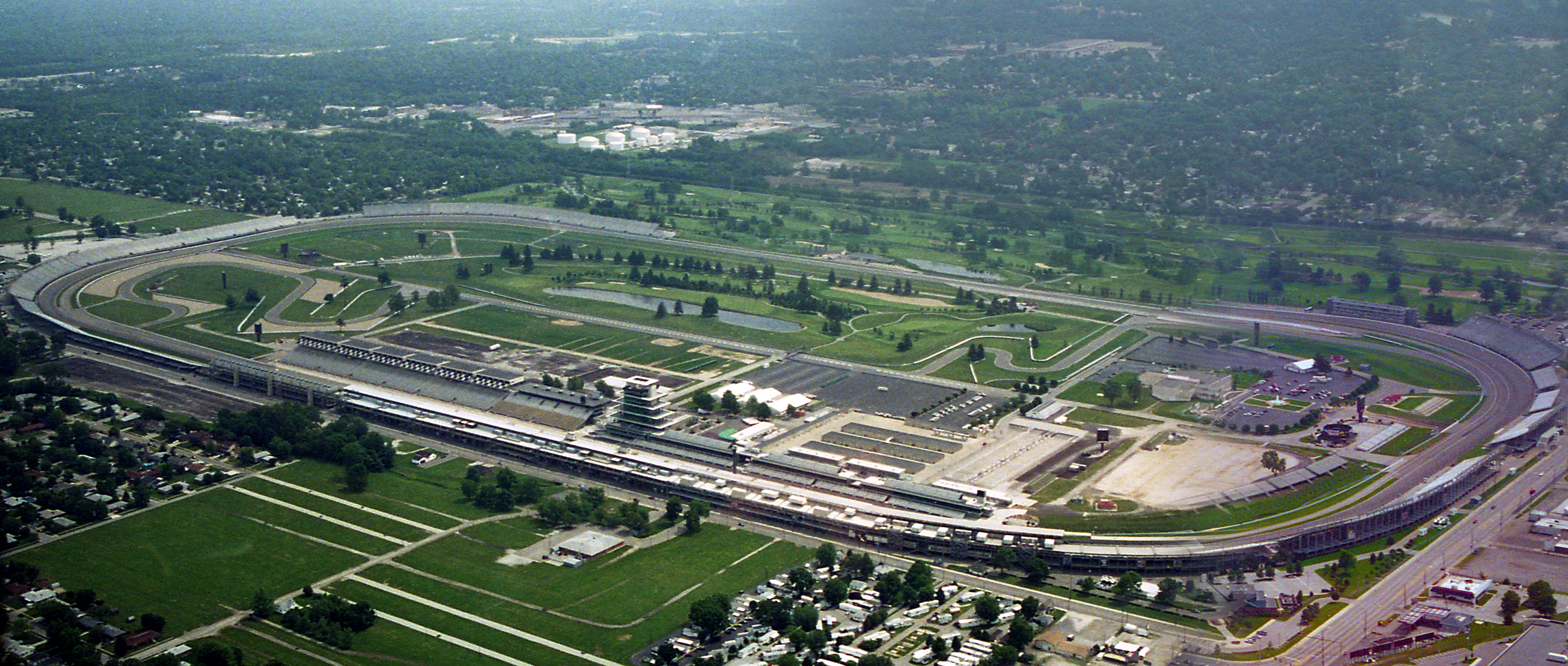
Indianapolis Motor Speedway, the track where the race was held.

The Indianapolis Motor Speedway, located in Speedway, Indiana, (an enclave suburb of Indianapolis) in the United States, is the home of the Indianapolis 500 and the Brickyard 400. It is located on the corner of 16th Street and Georgetown Road, approximately 6 miles (9.7 kilometres) west of Downtown Indianapolis. It is a four-turn rectangular-oval track that is 2.5 miles (4.0 kilometres) long. The track's turns are banked at 9 degrees, while the front stretch, the location of the finish line, has no banking. The back stretch, opposite of the front, also has a zero degree banking. The racetrack has seats for more than 250,000 spectators.

== Qualifying ==
Pole qualifications were held on August 3, two days before the race. Ricky Rudd qualified on pole position with a speed of 181.068 mph (291.401 km/h). Darrell Waltrip qualified in second position, a surprise result as Waltrip had struggled for most of the 2000 season, including failing to qualify for three previous races in the season and failing to finish in the top 20 in any race prior. Waltrip received an ovation from the crowd in attendance as well as several competitors - including his younger brother Michael Waltrip. The championship leader entering the race, Bobby Labonte, qualified in third.

During qualifying, Todd Bodine qualified the No. 5 Hendrick Motorsports entry for Terry Labonte while Labonte underwent further assessment for injuries he had sustained at the Pepsi 400 at Daytona International Speedway. Labonte had further aggravated his injuries by participating in the races following Daytona and needed a relief driver for the Pennsylvania 500 at Pocono Raceway, but he still had intentions of racing at Indianapolis when CT scans came back negative. However, during post-qualifying practice, Labonte turned only one lap before suffering dizziness. Labonte then made the decision to withdraw from both Indianapolis and the following race at Watkins Glen International to fully recover. Todd Bodine would remain in the car for the Brickyard. The injuries brought an end to Labonte's streak of 655 consecutive races started.

=== Full qualifying results ===
| Pos. | # | Driver | Make | Team | Time | Speed (mph) |
|---|---|---|---|---|---|---|
| 1 | 28 | Ricky Rudd | Ford | Robert Yates Racing | 49.705 | 181.068 |
| 2 | 66 | Darrell Waltrip | Ford | Haas-Carter Motorsports | 49.745 | 180.923 |
| 3 | 18 | Bobby Labonte | Pontiac | Joe Gibbs Racing | 49.763 | 180.857 |
| 4 | 12 | Jeremy Mayfield | Ford | Penske-Kranefuss Racing | 49.772 | 180.825 |
| 5 | 88 | Dale Jarrett | Ford | Robert Yates Racing | 49.807 | 180.697 |
| 6 | 8 | Dale Earnhardt Jr. | Chevrolet | Dale Earnhardt, Inc. | 49.854 | 180.527 |
| 7 | 94 | Bill Elliott | Ford | Bill Elliott Racing | 49.876 | 180.448 |
| 8 | 3 | Dale Earnhardt | Chevrolet | Richard Childress Racing | 49.891 | 180.393 |
| 9 | 31 | Mike Skinner | Chevrolet | Richard Childress Racing | 49.912 | 180.317 |
| 10 | 2 | Rusty Wallace | Ford | Penske-Kranefuss Racing | 49.916 | 180.303 |
| 11 | 32 | Scott Pruett | Ford | PPI Motorsports | 49.921 | 180.285 |
| 12 | 6 | Mark Martin | Ford | Roush Racing | 49.970 | 180.108 |
| 13 | 10 | Johnny Benson Jr. | Pontiac | MB2 Motorsports | 50.003 | 179.989 |
| 14 | 7 | Michael Waltrip | Chevrolet | Ultra Motorsports | 50.043 | 179.845 |
| 15 | 43 | John Andretti | Pontiac | Petty Enterprises | 50.165 | 179.408 |
| 16 | 22 | Ward Burton | Pontiac | Bill Davis Racing | 50.167 | 179.401 |
| 17 | 55 | Kenny Wallace | Chevrolet | Andy Petree Racing | 50.171 | 179.386 |
| 18 | 20 | Tony Stewart | Pontiac | Joe Gibbs Racing | 50.195 | 179.301 |
| 19 | 77 | Robert Pressley | Ford | Jasper Motorsports | 50.199 | 179.286 |
| 20 | 40 | Sterling Marlin | Chevrolet | Team SABCO | 50.200 | 179.283 |
| 21 | 26 | Jimmy Spencer | Ford | Haas-Carter Motorsports | 50.201 | 179.279 |
| 22 | 1 | Steve Park | Chevrolet | Dale Earnhardt, Inc. | 50.207 | 179.258 |
| 23 | 25 | Jerry Nadeau | Chevrolet | Hendrick Motorsports | 50.219 | 179.215 |
| 24 | 14 | Rick Mast | Pontiac | A. J. Foyt Enterprises | 50.232 | 179.169 |
| 25 | 5 | Todd Bodine | Chevrolet | Hendrick Motorsports | 50.344 | 178.770 |
| 26 | 11 | Brett Bodine | Ford | Brett Bodine Racing | 49.704^{1} | 181.072 |
| 27 | 60 | Geoff Bodine | Chevrolet | Joe Bessey Motorsports | 50.269 | 179.037 |
| 28 | 21 | Elliott Sadler | Ford | Wood Brothers Racing | 50.350 | 178.749 |
| 29 | 24 | Jeff Gordon | Chevrolet | Hendrick Motorsports | 50.351 | 178.745 |
| 30 | 50 | Ricky Craven | Chevrolet | Midwest Transit Racing | 50.351 | 178.745 |
| 31 | 75 | Wally Dallenbach Jr. | Ford | Galaxy Motorsports | 50.355 | 178.731 |
| 32 | 4 | Bobby Hamilton | Chevrolet | Morgan-McClure Motorsports | 50.356 | 178.727 |
| 33 | 99 | Jeff Burton | Ford | Roush Racing | 50.358 | 178.720 |
| 34 | 27 | Mike Bliss | Pontiac | Eel River Racing | 50.441 | 178.426 |
| 35 | 33 | Joe Nemechek | Chevrolet | Andy Petree Racing | 50.448 | 178.402 |
| 36 | 90 | Hut Stricklin | Ford | Donlavey Racing | 50.450 | 178.394 |
Provisionals
| 37 | 17 | Matt Kenseth | Ford | Roush Racing | — | — |
| 38 | 36 | Ken Schrader | Pontiac | MB2 Motorsports | — | — |
| 39 | 97 | Chad Little | Ford | Roush Racing | — | — |
| 40 | 16 | Kevin Lepage | Ford | Roush Racing | — | — |
| 41 | 01 | Ted Musgrave | Chevrolet | Team SABCO | — | — |
| 42 | 93 | Dave Blaney | Pontiac | Bill Davis Racing | — | — |
| 43 | 9 | Stacy Compton | Ford | Melling Racing | — | — |
Failed to qualify
| 44 | 95 | David Keith | Ford | Sadler Brothers Racing | 50.539 | 178.080 |
| 45 | 61 | Rich Bickle | Chevrolet | Coulter Racing | 50.661 | 177.651 |
| 46 | 71 | Dave Marcis | Chevrolet | Marcis Auto Racing | 50.944 | 176.665 |
| 47 | 13 | Robby Gordon | Ford | Team Menard | 51.141 | 175.984 |
| 48 | 44 | Kyle Petty | Pontiac | Petty Enterprises | 51.517 | 174.700 |
| 49 | 52 | Bill Baird | Chevrolet | Baird Motorsports | 52.319 | 172.022 |

- ^{1} Brett Bodine was the fastest qualifier, however his lap was set on the second day of qualifying, forcing him to line up behind those who qualified on pole day.

== Jeremy Mayfield practice accident ==
During post-qualifying practice on August 4, Jeremy Mayfield suffered a major accident in turn 3. Mayfield lost control of his car while following teammate Rusty Wallace, causing him to spin and heavily impact the outside wall on driver-side. Mayfield was initially found unconscious, though awoke shortly after. Safety crews took roughly 10 minutes to extract Mayfield from the car before transporting him directly to Methodist Hospital with what was described as a "moderate concussion." Mayfield checked himself out of the hospital later on Friday, but the injury would force him to miss the next two races. Kyle Petty, who had failed to qualify in his primary Petty Enterprises car, was hired to be the injury substitute for the Brickyard. By NASCAR rules, Petty would have to drop to the rear of the field for the start on race day due to the driver swap.

== Race ==
The race was held on Saturday, August 5. Ricky Rudd led from pole position for the first 17 laps, but would not lead for the remainder of the race. The first of two cautions during the race came at lap 17, when Mike Skinner made contact with Mark Martin, sending Martin heavily into the turn 1 wall. As cars slowed to avoid Martin's wrecked car, Jeff Gordon collided with the rear of Rick Mast, sending Mast into a spin and causing significant front-end damage to Gordon's car. Rusty Wallace assumed the lead when racing resumed. At lap 32, Jerry Nadeau took the lead for an 11 lap stretch; after this, the battle for the lead was exclusively between Wallace and Bobby Labonte.

The second and final caution of the race came at lap 44, when John Andretti suffered a punctured tire entering turn 3, causing him to heavily impact the outside wall. Racing resumed at lap 46 and remained under green-flag conditions for the remainder of the race. Rusty Wallace was the dominant car for much of the day, leading 110 of the race's 160 laps. He, however, was constantly under pressure from Bobby Labonte and, on lap 146, Labonte moved alongside Wallace at turn 3 for the lead. The two remained side-by-side through turn 4 and down the frontstraight before Labonte successfully completed the pass into turn 1. Labonte would lead the remainder of the race and go on to take victory. The race set a new record for the fastest running for the Brickyard 400 at 155.912 mph (250.916 km/h), narrowly surpassing the record set at the 1995 Brickyard 400. For Labonte, despite having led the championship for nearly the entire 2000 season, it was his first win since North Carolina Speedway in February.

== Results ==
| Pos | SP | No. | Driver | Car make | Entrant | Laps | Status |
|---|---|---|---|---|---|---|---|
| 1 | 3 | 18 | Bobby Labonte | Pontiac | Joe Gibbs Racing | 160 | Running |
| 2 | 10 | 2 | Rusty Wallace | Ford | Penske-Kranefuss Racing | 160 | Running |
| 3 | 7 | 94 | Bill Elliott | Ford | Bill Elliott Racing | 160 | Running |
| 4 | 23 | 25 | Jerry Nadeau | Chevrolet | Hendrick Motorsports | 160 | Running |
| 5 | 18 | 20 | Tony Stewart | Pontiac | Joe Gibbs Racing | 160 | Running |
| 6 | 33 | 99 | Jeff Burton | Ford | Roush Racing | 160 | Running |
| 7 | 5 | 88 | Dale Jarrett | Ford | Robert Yates Racing | 160 | Running |
| 8 | 8 | 3 | Dale Earnhardt | Chevrolet | Richard Childress Racing | 160 | Running |
| 9 | 9 | 31 | Mike Skinner | Chevrolet | Richard Childress Racing | 160 | Running |
| 10 | 11 | 32 | Scott Pruett | Ford | PPI Motorsports | 160 | Running |
| 11 | 2 | 66 | Darrell Waltrip | Ford | Haas-Carter Motorsports | 160 | Running |
| 12 | 27 | 60 | Geoff Bodine | Chevrolet | Joe Bessey Motorsports | 160 | Running |
| 13 | 6 | 8 | Dale Earnhardt Jr. | Chevrolet | Dale Earnhardt, Inc. | 160 | Running |
| 14 | 36 | 90 | Hut Stricklin | Ford | Donlavey Racing | 160 | Running |
| 15 | 25 | 5 | Todd Bodine | Chevrolet | Hendrick Motorsports | 159 | Running |
| 16 | 22 | 1 | Steve Park | Chevrolet | Dale Earnhardt, Inc. | 159 | Running |
| 17 | 21 | 26 | Jimmy Spencer | Ford | Haas-Carter Motorsports | 159 | Running |
| 18 | 35 | 33 | Joe Nemechek | Chevrolet | Andy Petree Racing | 159 | Running |
| 19 | 39 | 97 | Chad Little | Ford | Roush Racing | 159 | Running |
| 20 | 14 | 7 | Michael Waltrip | Chevrolet | Ultra Motorsports | 159 | Running |
| 21 | 1 | 28 | Ricky Rudd | Ford | Robert Yates Racing | 159 | Running |
| 22 | 38 | 36 | Ken Schrader | Pontiac | MB2 Motorsports | 159 | Running |
| 23 | 42 | 93 | Dave Blaney | Pontiac | Bill Davis Racing | 159 | Running |
| 24 | 41 | 01 | Ted Musgrave | Chevrolet | Team SABCO | 159 | Running |
| 25 | 13 | 10 | Johnny Benson Jr. | Pontiac | MB2 Motorsports | 159 | Running |
| 26 | 37 | 17 | Matt Kenseth | Ford | Roush Racing | 159 | Running |
| 27 | 19 | 77 | Robert Pressley | Ford | Jasper Motorsports | 159 | Running |
| 28 | 16 | 22 | Ward Burton | Pontiac | Bill Davis Racing | 159 | Running |
| 29 | 17 | 55 | Kenny Wallace | Chevrolet | Andy Petree Racing | 158 | Running |
| 30 | 20 | 40 | Sterling Marlin | Chevrolet | Team SABCO | 158 | Running |
| 31 | 34 | 27 | Mike Bliss | Pontiac | Eel River Racing | 158 | Running |
| 32 | 4 | 12 | Kyle Petty | Ford | Penske-Kranefuss Racing | 158 | Running |
| 33 | 29 | 24 | Jeff Gordon | Chevrolet | Hendrick Motorsports | 158 | Running |
| 34 | 28 | 21 | Elliott Sadler | Ford | Wood Brothers Racing | 158 | Running |
| 35 | 31 | 75 | Wally Dallenbach Jr. | Ford | Galaxy Motorsports | 158 | Running |
| 36 | 40 | 16 | Kevin Lepage | Ford | Roush Racing | 158 | Running |
| 37 | 43 | 9 | Stacy Compton | Ford | Melling Racing | 157 | Running |
| 38 | 24 | 14 | Rick Mast | Pontiac | A. J. Foyt Enterprises | 156 | Running |
| 39 | 26 | 11 | Brett Bodine | Ford | Brett Bodine Racing | 155 | Running |
| 40 | 32 | 4 | Bobby Hamilton | Chevrolet | Morgan-McClure Motorsports | 129 | Engine |
| 41 | 30 | 50 | Ricky Craven | Chevrolet | Midwest Transit Racing | 59 | Steering |
| 42 | 15 | 43 | John Andretti | Pontiac | Petty Enterprises | 41 | Crash |
| 43 | 12 | 6 | Mark Martin | Ford | Roush Racing | 15 | Crash |

=== Failed to qualify ===
- David Keith (#95)
- Rich Bickle (#61)
- Dave Marcis (#71)
- Robby Gordon (#13)
- Kyle Petty (#44)
- Bill Baird (#52)
- Terry Labonte (#5) - injured at previous race, replaced by Todd Bodine
- Jeremy Mayfield (#12) - injured in practice crash, replaced by Kyle Petty
- Morgan Shepherd (#80) - withdrawn
- Carl Long (#85) - withdrawn

=== Race statistics ===
- Time of race: 2:33:56
- Average speed: 155.912 miles per hour (250.916 km/h)
- Pole speed: 181.068 miles per hour (291.401 km/h)
- Cautions: 2 for 7 laps
- Margin of victory: 4.229 seconds
- Lead changes: 9
- Percent of race run under caution: 4.4%
- Average green flag run: 51 laps

Lap leaders
| Laps | Leader |
|---|---|
| 1–17 | Ricky Rudd |
| 18 | Stacy Compton |
| 19–32 | Rusty Wallace |
| 33–43 | Jerry Nadeau |
| 44–82 | Rusty Wallace |
| 83–84 | Bobby Labonte |
| 85–118 | Rusty Wallace |
| 119–122 | Bobby Labonte |
| 123–145 | Rusty Wallace |
| 146–160 | Bobby Labonte |

Total laps led
| 110 | Rusty Wallace |
| 21 | Bobby Labonte |
| 17 | Ricky Rudd |
| 11 | Jerry Nadeau |
| 1 | Stacy Compton |

Cautions: 2 for 7 laps
| Laps | Reason |
|---|---|
| 17–20 | #6 (Mark Martin) and #14 (Rick Mast) crash turn 1 |
| 44–46 | #43 (John Andretti) crash turn 3 |

== Media ==
=== Television ===
The race was aired live on ABC in the United States in which was their last broadcast of the NASCAR Winston Cup Series until the 2007 Brickyard 400 (in which the series was renamed to the NASCAR Nextel Cup Series) as part of ESPN group of networks. Bob Jenkins, 1973 NASCAR Winston Cup Series champion Benny Parsons and two-time Brickyard 400 winning crew chief Ray Evernham called the race from the broadcast booth. Jerry Punch, Bill Weber and Ray Dunlap handled pit road for the television side.

ABC
| Booth announcers | | Pit reporters |
| Lap-by-lap | Color commentators | Pit reporters |
|---|---|---|
| Bob Jenkins | Benny Parsons; Ray Evernham | Jerry Punch; Bill Weber; Ray Dunlap |
