= 2000 Pennsylvania 500 =

19th race of the 2000 NASCAR Winston Cup Series

Race details
- Race 19 of 34 in the 2000 NASCAR Winston Cup Series
- The 2000 Pennsylvania 500 program cover, featuring Bobby Labonte.
- Date: July 23, 2000
- Official name: 28th Annual Pennsylvania 500
- Location: Long Pond, Pennsylvania, Pocono Raceway
- Course: Permanent racing facility
- Course length: 2.5 miles (4.023 km)
- Distance: 200 laps, 500 mi (804.672 km)
- Average speed: 130.662 miles per hour (210.280 km/h)

Pole position
Driver	Tony Stewart	Joe Gibbs Racing
- Time: 52.207

Most laps led
Driver	Dale Jarrett	Robert Yates Racing
- Laps: 73

Winner
No. 2	Rusty Wallace	Penske-Kranefuss Racing

Television in the United States
- Network: TBS
- Announcers: Allen Bestwick, Buddy Baker, Dick Berggren

Radio in the United States
- Radio: Motor Racing Network

The 2000 Pennsylvania 500 was the 19th stock car race of the 2000 NASCAR Winston Cup Series and the 28th iteration of the event. The race was held on Sunday, July 23, 2000, in Long Pond, Pennsylvania, at Pocono Raceway, a 2.5 miles (4.0 km) triangular permanent course. The race took the scheduled 200 laps to complete. On the final lap of the race, leader of the race, Penske-Kranefuss Racing driver Jeremy Mayfield would blow a tire heading into the second turn. Behind Mayfield, two drivers battling for position, teammate Rusty Wallace and Roush Racing driver Jeff Burton were battling for the second position, When Mayfield blew a tire, the two passed Mayfield, leading the two of them to battle for the lead. At the end of the race, Wallace was able to defend Burton to claim his 51st career NASCAR Winston Cup Series victory and his second victory of the season. To fill out the top three, the aforementioned Jeff Burton and Hendrick Motorsports driver Jeff Gordon would finish second and third, respectively.

== Background ==
The layout of Pocono Raceway, the venue where the race was held.

The race was held at Pocono Raceway, which is a three-turn superspeedway located in Long Pond, Pennsylvania. The track hosts two annual NASCAR Sprint Cup Series races, as well as one Xfinity Series and Camping World Truck Series event. Until 2019, the track also hosted an IndyCar Series race.

Pocono Raceway is one of a very few NASCAR tracks not owned by either Speedway Motorsports, Inc. or International Speedway Corporation. It is operated by the Igdalsky siblings Brandon, Nicholas, and sister Ashley, and cousins Joseph IV and Chase Mattioli, all of whom are third-generation members of the family-owned Mattco Inc, started by Joseph II and Rose Mattioli.

Outside of the NASCAR races, the track is used throughout the year by Sports Car Club of America (SCCA) and motorcycle clubs as well as racing schools and an IndyCar race. The triangular oval also has three separate infield sections of racetrack – North Course, East Course and South Course. Each of these infield sections use a separate portion of the tri-oval to complete the track. During regular non-race weekends, multiple clubs can use the track by running on different infield sections. Also some of the infield sections can be run in either direction, or multiple infield sections can be put together – such as running the North Course and the South Course and using the tri-oval to connect the two.

=== Entry list ===
- (R) denotes rookie driver.

#	Driver	Team	Make
1	Steve Park	Dale Earnhardt, Inc.	Chevrolet
01	Ted Musgrave	Team SABCO	Chevrolet
2	Rusty Wallace	Penske-Kranefuss Racing	Ford
3	Dale Earnhardt	Richard Childress Racing	Chevrolet
4	Bobby Hamilton	Morgan–McClure Motorsports	Chevrolet
5	Terry Labonte	Hendrick Motorsports	Chevrolet
6	Mark Martin	Roush Racing	Ford
7	Michael Waltrip	Ultra Motorsports	Chevrolet
8	Dale Earnhardt Jr. (R)	Dale Earnhardt, Inc.	Chevrolet
9	Stacy Compton (R)	Melling Racing	Ford
10	Johnny Benson Jr.	Tyler Jet Motorsports	Pontiac
11	Brett Bodine	Brett Bodine Racing	Ford
12	Jeremy Mayfield	Penske-Kranefuss Racing	Ford
14	Rick Mast	A. J. Foyt Enterprises	Pontiac
16	Kevin Lepage	Roush Racing	Ford
17	Matt Kenseth (R)	Roush Racing	Ford
18	Bobby Labonte	Joe Gibbs Racing	Pontiac
20	Tony Stewart	Joe Gibbs Racing	Pontiac
21	Elliott Sadler	Wood Brothers Racing	Ford
22	Ward Burton	Bill Davis Racing	Pontiac
24	Jeff Gordon	Hendrick Motorsports	Chevrolet
25	Jerry Nadeau	Hendrick Motorsports	Chevrolet
26	Jimmy Spencer	Haas-Carter Motorsports	Ford
27	Mike Bliss (R)	Eel River Racing	Pontiac
28	Ricky Rudd	Robert Yates Racing	Ford
31	Mike Skinner	Richard Childress Racing	Chevrolet
32	Scott Pruett (R)	PPI Motorsports	Ford
33	Joe Nemechek	Andy Petree Racing	Chevrolet
36	Ken Schrader	MB2 Motorsports	Pontiac
40	Sterling Marlin	Team SABCO	Chevrolet
43	John Andretti	Petty Enterprises	Pontiac
44	Kyle Petty	Petty Enterprises	Pontiac
55	Kenny Wallace	Andy Petree Racing	Chevrolet
60	Geoff Bodine	Joe Bessey Racing	Chevrolet
66	Darrell Waltrip	Haas-Carter Motorsports	Ford
71	Dave Marcis	Marcis Auto Racing	Chevrolet
75	Wally Dallenbach Jr.	Galaxy Motorsports	Ford
77	Robert Pressley	Jasper Motorsports	Ford
85	Carl Long	Mansion Motorsports	Ford
88	Dale Jarrett	Robert Yates Racing	Ford
90	Hut Stricklin	Donlavey Racing	Ford
93	Dave Blaney (R)	Bill Davis Racing	Pontiac
94	Bill Elliott	Bill Elliott Racing	Ford
97	Chad Little	Roush Racing	Ford
99	Jeff Burton	Roush Racing	Ford
Official entry list

== Practice ==
=== First practice ===
The first practice session was held on Friday, July 21, at 11:00 AM EST. The session would last for three hours. Mark Martin, driving for Roush Racing, would set the fastest time in the session, with a lap of 52.377 and an average speed of 171.831 mph (276.535 km/h).

Pos.	#	Driver	Team	Make	Time	Speed
1	6	Mark Martin	Roush Racing	Ford	52.377	171.831
2	12	Jeremy Mayfield	Penske-Kranefuss Racing	Ford	52.454	171.578
3	99	Jeff Burton	Roush Racing	Ford	52.612	171.063
Full first practice results

=== Second practice ===
The second practice session was held on Saturday, July 22, at 9:30 AM EST. The session would last for one hour and 20 minutes. Ted Musgrave, driving for Team SABCO, would set the fastest time in the session, with a lap of 53.416 and an average speed of 168.489 mph (271.157 km/h).

Pos.	#	Driver	Team	Make	Time	Speed
1	01	Ted Musgrave	Team SABCO	Chevrolet	53.416	168.489
2	14	Rick Mast	A. J. Foyt Enterprises	Pontiac	53.475	168.303
3	60	Geoff Bodine	Joe Bessey Racing	Chevrolet	53.544	168.086
Full second practice results

=== Final practice ===
The final practice session, sometimes referred to as Happy Hour, was held on Saturday, July 22, after the preliminary 2000 Pepsi ARCA 200 ARCA Re/Max Series race. The session would last for one hour. Matt Kenseth, driving for Roush Racing, would set the fastest time in the session, with a lap of 54.338 and an average speed of 165.629 mph (266.554 km/h).

Pos.	#	Driver	Team	Make	Time	Speed
1	17	Matt Kenseth (R)	Roush Racing	Ford	54.338	165.629
2	12	Jeremy Mayfield	Penske-Kranefuss Racing	Ford	54.370	165.532
3	28	Ricky Rudd	Robert Yates Racing	Ford	54.421	165.377
Full Happy Hour practice results

== Qualifying ==
Qualifying was split into two rounds. The first round was held on Friday, July 21, at 3:00 PM EST. Each driver would have one lap to set a time. During the first round, the top 25 drivers in the round would be guaranteed a starting spot in the race. If a driver was not able to guarantee a spot in the first round, they had the option to scrub their time from the first round and try and run a faster lap time in a second round qualifying run, held on Saturday, July 22, at 11:30 AM EST. As with the first round, each driver would have one lap to set a time. Positions 26-36 would be decided on time, while positions 37-43 would be based on provisionals. Six spots are awarded by the use of provisionals based on owner's points. The seventh is awarded to a past champion who has not otherwise qualified for the race. If no past champion needs the provisional, the next team in the owner points will be awarded a provisional.

Tony Stewart, driving for Joe Gibbs Racing, would win the pole, setting a time of 52.207 and an average speed of 172.391 miles per hour (277.436 km/h) in the first round.

Two drivers would fail to qualify.

=== Full qualifying results ===
Pos.	#	Driver	Team	Make	Time	Speed
1	20	Tony Stewart	Joe Gibbs Racing	Pontiac	52.207	172.391
2	2	Rusty Wallace	Penske-Kranefuss Racing	Ford	52.278	172.157
3	6	Mark Martin	Roush Racing	Ford	52.433	171.648
4	12	Jeremy Mayfield	Penske-Kranefuss Racing	Ford	52.465	171.543
5	24	Jeff Gordon	Hendrick Motorsports	Chevrolet	52.479	171.497
6	25	Jerry Nadeau	Hendrick Motorsports	Chevrolet	52.493	171.451
7	94	Bill Elliott	Bill Elliott Racing	Ford	52.533	171.321
8	99	Jeff Burton	Roush Racing	Ford	52.537	171.308
9	10	Johnny Benson Jr.	MB2 Motorsports	Pontiac	52.573	171.191
10	1	Steve Park	Dale Earnhardt, Inc.	Chevrolet	52.605	171.086
11	88	Dale Jarrett	Robert Yates Racing	Ford	52.607	171.080
12	43	John Andretti	Petty Enterprises	Pontiac	52.639	170.976
13	18	Bobby Labonte	Joe Gibbs Racing	Pontiac	52.754	170.603
14	28	Ricky Rudd	Robert Yates Racing	Ford	52.754	170.603
15	8	Dale Earnhardt Jr. (R)	Dale Earnhardt, Inc.	Chevrolet	52.764	170.571
16	33	Joe Nemechek	Andy Petree Racing	Chevrolet	52.823	170.380
17	31	Mike Skinner	Richard Childress Racing	Chevrolet	52.829	170.361
18	93	Dave Blaney (R)	Bill Davis Racing	Pontiac	52.862	170.255
19	11	Brett Bodine	Brett Bodine Racing	Ford	52.947	169.981
20	77	Robert Pressley	Jasper Motorsports	Ford	52.972	169.901
21	7	Michael Waltrip	Ultra Motorsports	Chevrolet	52.978	169.882
22	5	Terry Labonte	Hendrick Motorsports	Chevrolet	53.055	169.635
23	16	Kevin Lepage	Roush Racing	Ford	53.061	169.616
24	17	Matt Kenseth (R)	Roush Racing	Ford	53.065	169.603
25	3	Dale Earnhardt	Richard Childress Racing	Chevrolet	53.070	169.587
Failed to lock in Round 1
26	01	Ted Musgrave	Team SABCO	Chevrolet	53.008	169.786
27	55	Kenny Wallace	Andy Petree Racing	Chevrolet	53.118	169.434
28	26	Jimmy Spencer	Haas-Carter Motorsports	Ford	53.149	169.335
29	36	Ken Schrader	MB2 Motorsports	Pontiac	53.167	169.278
30	97	Chad Little	Roush Racing	Ford	53.179	169.240
31	75	Wally Dallenbach Jr.	Galaxy Motorsports	Ford	53.195	169.189
32	44	Kyle Petty	Petty Enterprises	Pontiac	53.202	169.167
33	32	Scott Pruett (R)	PPI Motorsports	Ford	53.209	169.144
34	40	Sterling Marlin	Team SABCO	Chevrolet	53.238	169.052
35	14	Rick Mast	A. J. Foyt Racing	Pontiac	53.259	168.986
36	21	Elliott Sadler	Wood Brothers Racing	Ford	53.262	168.976
Provisionals
37	22	Ward Burton	Bill Davis Racing	Pontiac	53.273	168.941
38	4	Bobby Hamilton	Morgan–McClure Motorsports	Chevrolet	54.001	166.664
39	9	Stacy Compton (R)	Melling Racing	Ford	53.443	168.404
40	27	Mike Bliss (R)	Eel River Racing	Pontiac	53.617	167.857
41	66	Darrell Waltrip	Haas-Carter Motorsports	Ford	53.448	168.388
42	90	Ed Berrier (R)	Donlavey Racing	Ford	54.440	165.320
43	71	Dave Marcis	Marcis Auto Racing	Chevrolet	53.829	167.196
Failed to qualify
44	60	Geoff Bodine	Joe Bessey Racing	Chevrolet	53.307	168.833
45	85	Carl Long	Mansion Motorsports	Ford	54.281	165.804
Official first round qualifying results
Official starting lineup

== Race results ==
Fin	St	#	Driver	Team	Make	Laps	Led	Status	Pts	Winnings
1	2	2	Rusty Wallace	Penske-Kranefuss Racing	Ford	200	49	running	180	$125,745
2	8	99	Jeff Burton	Roush Racing	Ford	200	11	running	175	$121,245
3	5	24	Jeff Gordon	Hendrick Motorsports	Chevrolet	200	10	running	170	$92,045
4	11	88	Dale Jarrett	Robert Yates Racing	Ford	200	73	running	170	$97,470
5	24	17	Matt Kenseth (R)	Roush Racing	Ford	200	0	running	155	$71,590
6	13	18	Bobby Labonte	Joe Gibbs Racing	Pontiac	200	1	running	155	$62,065
7	17	31	Mike Skinner	Richard Childress Racing	Chevrolet	200	0	running	146	$53,915
8	35	14	Rick Mast	A. J. Foyt Racing	Pontiac	200	0	running	142	$41,615
9	28	26	Jimmy Spencer	Haas-Carter Motorsports	Ford	200	0	running	138	$49,715
10	4	12	Jeremy Mayfield	Penske-Kranefuss Racing	Ford	200	31	running	139	$49,615
11	22	5	Terry Labonte	Hendrick Motorsports	Chevrolet	200	0	running	130	$60,565
12	9	10	Johnny Benson Jr.	MB2 Motorsports	Pontiac	200	4	running	132	$38,915
13	15	8	Dale Earnhardt Jr. (R)	Dale Earnhardt, Inc.	Chevrolet	200	0	running	124	$43,015
14	20	77	Robert Pressley	Jasper Motorsports	Ford	200	0	running	121	$36,015
15	10	1	Steve Park	Dale Earnhardt, Inc.	Chevrolet	200	0	running	118	$45,390
16	26	01	Ted Musgrave	Team SABCO	Chevrolet	200	0	running	115	$46,590
17	21	7	Michael Waltrip	Ultra Motorsports	Chevrolet	200	0	running	112	$44,090
18	18	93	Dave Blaney (R)	Bill Davis Racing	Pontiac	200	0	running	109	$30,990
19	29	36	Ken Schrader	MB2 Motorsports	Pontiac	200	0	running	106	$34,440
20	30	97	Chad Little	Roush Racing	Ford	200	0	running	103	$46,515
21	27	55	Kenny Wallace	Andy Petree Racing	Chevrolet	200	0	running	100	$42,390
22	41	66	Darrell Waltrip	Haas-Carter Motorsports	Ford	200	0	running	97	$33,490
23	23	16	Kevin Lepage	Roush Racing	Ford	200	2	running	99	$41,165
24	40	27	Mike Bliss (R)	Eel River Racing	Pontiac	200	0	running	91	$29,640
25	25	3	Dale Earnhardt	Richard Childress Racing	Chevrolet	199	6	running	93	$48,915
26	1	20	Tony Stewart	Joe Gibbs Racing	Pontiac	199	0	running	85	$56,490
27	6	25	Jerry Nadeau	Hendrick Motorsports	Chevrolet	199	0	running	82	$40,415
28	37	22	Ward Burton	Bill Davis Racing	Pontiac	198	0	running	79	$47,065
29	36	21	Elliott Sadler	Wood Brothers Racing	Ford	184	0	running	76	$39,990
30	19	11	Brett Bodine	Brett Bodine Racing	Ford	183	0	transmission	73	$29,240
31	31	75	Wally Dallenbach Jr.	Galaxy Motorsports	Ford	176	0	transmission	70	$31,590
32	7	94	Bill Elliott	Bill Elliott Racing	Ford	163	13	engine	72	$39,440
33	42	90	Ed Berrier (R)	Donlavey Racing	Ford	160	0	rear end	64	$28,240
34	16	33	Joe Nemechek	Andy Petree Racing	Chevrolet	159	0	engine	61	$38,515
35	39	9	Stacy Compton (R)	Melling Racing	Ford	148	0	engine	58	$27,415
36	33	32	Scott Pruett (R)	PPI Motorsports	Ford	141	0	engine	55	$27,290
37	43	71	Dave Marcis	Marcis Auto Racing	Chevrolet	128	0	engine	52	$27,200
38	14	28	Ricky Rudd	Robert Yates Racing	Ford	111	0	crash	49	$35,150
39	38	4	Bobby Hamilton	Morgan–McClure Motorsports	Chevrolet	106	0	engine	46	$35,100
40	32	44	Kyle Petty	Petty Enterprises	Pontiac	96	0	engine	43	$35,025
41	12	43	John Andretti	Petty Enterprises	Pontiac	41	0	engine	40	$44,975
42	34	40	Sterling Marlin	Team SABCO	Chevrolet	31	0	engine	37	$34,925
43	3	6	Mark Martin	Roush Racing	Ford	25	0	engine	34	$44,875
Failed to qualify
44		60	Geoff Bodine	Joe Bessey Racing	Chevrolet					
45		85	Carl Long	Mansion Motorsports	Ford					
Official race results

Previous race: 2000 thatlook.com 300	NASCAR Winston Cup Series; 2000 season	Next race: 2000 Brickyard 400
