= 2000 thatlook.com 300 =

18th race of the 2000 NASCAR Winston Cup Series

Race details
- Race 18 of 34 in the 2000 NASCAR Winston Cup Series
- The 2000 thatlook.com 300 program cover.
- Date: July 9, 2000
- Official name: 8th Annual thatlook.com 300
- Location: Loudon, New Hampshire, New Hampshire International Speedway
- Course: Permanent racing facility
- Course length: 1.058 miles (1.704 km)
- Distance: 273 laps, 288.834 mi (464.833 km)
- Scheduled distance: 300 laps, 317.4 mi (510.805 km)
- Average speed: 103.145 miles per hour (165.996 km/h)

Pole position
Driver	Rusty Wallace	Penske-Kranefuss Racing
- Time: 28.835

Most laps led
Driver	Tony Stewart	Joe Gibbs Racing
- Laps: 156

Winner
No. 20	Tony Stewart	Joe Gibbs Racing

Television in the United States
- Network: TNN
- Announcers: Eli Gold, Buddy Baker, Dick Berggren

Radio in the United States
- Radio: Motor Racing Network

The 2000 thatlook.com 300 was the 18th stock car race of the 2000 NASCAR Winston Cup Series and the eighth iteration of the event. The race was held on Sunday, July 9, 2000, in Loudon, New Hampshire, at New Hampshire International Speedway, a 1.058-mile (1.703 km) permanent, oval-shaped, low-banked racetrack. The race was shortened from its scheduled 300 laps to 273 due to inclement weather. At race's end, Tony Stewart, driving for Joe Gibbs Racing, would complete a dominant performance when the race was stopped to win his sixth career NASCAR Winston Cup Series win and his third of the season. To fill out the podium, Joe Nemechek of Andy Petree Racing and Mark Martin of Roush Racing would finish second and third, respectively.

The race was marred by the death of Kenny Irwin Jr., who died due to a stuck throttle in the race's Friday practice session. The accident was eerily similar to another fatal crash at the same track when NASCAR Busch Series driver Adam Petty died in the 2000 Busch 200 two months before the race. After Irwin's death, NASCAR would face criticism for its lack of kill switches and safety in general.

== Background ==
New Hampshire International Speedway is a 1.058-mile (1.703 km) oval speedway located in Loudon, New Hampshire which has hosted NASCAR racing annually since the early 1990s, as well as an IndyCar weekend and the oldest motorcycle race in North America, the Loudon Classic. Nicknamed "The Magic Mile", the speedway is often converted into a 1.6-mile (2.6 km) road course, which includes much of the oval. The track was originally the site of Bryar Motorsports Park before being purchased and redeveloped by Bob Bahre. The track is currently one of eight major NASCAR tracks owned and operated by Speedway Motorsports.

=== Entry list ===
- (R) denotes rookie driver.

#	Driver	Team	Make
1	Steve Park	Dale Earnhardt, Inc.	Chevrolet
2	Rusty Wallace	Penske-Kranefuss Racing	Ford
3	Dale Earnhardt	Richard Childress Racing	Chevrolet
4	Bobby Hamilton	Morgan–McClure Motorsports	Chevrolet
5	Terry Labonte	Hendrick Motorsports	Chevrolet
6	Mark Martin	Roush Racing	Ford
7	Michael Waltrip	Mattei Motorsports	Chevrolet
8	Dale Earnhardt Jr. (R)	Dale Earnhardt, Inc.	Chevrolet
9	Stacy Compton (R)	Melling Racing	Ford
10	Johnny Benson Jr.	Tyler Jet Motorsports	Pontiac
11	Brett Bodine	Brett Bodine Racing	Ford
12	Jeremy Mayfield	Penske-Kranefuss Racing	Ford
14	Rick Mast	A. J. Foyt Enterprises	Pontiac
16	Kevin Lepage	Roush Racing	Ford
17	Matt Kenseth (R)	Roush Racing	Ford
18	Bobby Labonte	Joe Gibbs Racing	Pontiac
20	Tony Stewart	Joe Gibbs Racing	Pontiac
21	Elliott Sadler	Wood Brothers Racing	Ford
22	Ward Burton	Bill Davis Racing	Pontiac
24	Jeff Gordon	Hendrick Motorsports	Chevrolet
25	Jerry Nadeau	Hendrick Motorsports	Chevrolet
26	Jimmy Spencer	Haas-Carter Motorsports	Ford
27	Mike Bliss (R)	Eel River Racing	Pontiac
28	Ricky Rudd	Robert Yates Racing	Ford
31	Mike Skinner	Richard Childress Racing	Chevrolet
32	Scott Pruett (R)	PPI Motorsports	Ford
33	Joe Nemechek	Andy Petree Racing	Chevrolet
36	Ken Schrader	MB2 Motorsports	Pontiac
40	Sterling Marlin	Team SABCO	Chevrolet
42	Kenny Irwin Jr.*	Team SABCO	Chevrolet
43	John Andretti	Petty Enterprises	Pontiac
44	Steve Grissom	Petty Enterprises	Pontiac
50	Ricky Craven	Midwest Transit Racing	Chevrolet
55	Kenny Wallace	Andy Petree Racing	Chevrolet
60	Geoff Bodine	Joe Bessey Racing	Chevrolet
66	Darrell Waltrip	Haas-Carter Motorsports	Ford
71	Dave Marcis	Marcis Auto Racing	Chevrolet
75	Wally Dallenbach Jr.	Galaxy Motorsports	Ford
77	Robert Pressley	Jasper Motorsports	Ford
88	Dale Jarrett	Robert Yates Racing	Ford
90	Ed Berrier (R)	Donlavey Racing	Ford
93	Dave Blaney (R)	Bill Davis Racing	Pontiac
94	Bill Elliott	Bill Elliott Racing	Ford
97	Chad Little	Roush Racing	Ford
99	Jeff Burton	Roush Racing	Ford
Official entry list

*Withdrew due to a practice crash, killing Irwin.

== Practice ==
=== First practice ===
The first practice session was held on Friday, July 7, at 11:15 AM EST. The session would last for two hours and five minutes. Rusty Wallace of Penske-Kranefuss Racing would set the fastest time in the session, with a lap of 28.806 and an average speed of 132.222 mph (212.791 km/h).

Pos.	#	Driver	Team	Make	Time	Speed
1	2	Rusty Wallace	Penske-Kranefuss Racing	Ford	28.806	132.222
2	6	Mark Martin	Roush Racing	Ford	28.938	131.619
3	28	Ricky Rudd	Robert Yates Racing	Ford	28.975	131.451
Full first practice results

==== Death of Kenny Irwin Jr. ====
During the first practice session, Team SABCO driver Kenny Irwin Jr. would suffer a stuck throttle on his first lap, sending Irwin into the outside wall. Brett Bodine, who was behind Irwin at the time, reported in an interview with CNN that the car hit the Turn 3 outside wall, then proceeded to roll onto the driver's side, riding the wall. Eventually, after coming to a stop, Irwin's car flipped over to its roof. Irwin likely died instantly of a basilar skull fracture.

While the cause of the crash is widely believed to be a stuck throttle on Irwin's car, the local police department, led by police chief Robert Fiske, report that they could not hold a proper investigation due to both NASCAR and New Hampshire Motor Speedway president Bob Bahre continuing the scheduled pre-race activities. Fiske reported that if NASCAR had called the police earlier, they could have found out the exact cause, saying "I think there would be a good possibility, particularly because of the witnesses that we would have been able to gain. If they heard the acceleration, for instance, or saw something through the cockpit there, any number of things. Even the tracks that were left on the track. Was it straight into the wall? Did he start to turn? God only knows. I haven't a clue."

After the crash, NASCAR was criticized for its lack of urgency in safety, with another similar incident happening two months before at the same track with Adam Petty. Within the months after Irwin's crash, NASCAR and some race teams would experiment with creating new kill switches and head harnesses to avoid a crash like Irwin and Petty's. However, NASCAR would still be criticized for its lack of urgency even after the implemented kill switch, with the deaths of Tony Roper, Dale Earnhardt, and Blaise Alexander, all caused by basilar skull fractures finally convincing NASCAR to implement stricter safety measures.

=== Second practice ===
The second practice session was held on Saturday, July 8, at 9:00 AM EST. The session would last for one hour and 30 minutes. Scott Pruett of PPI Motorsports would set the fastest time in the session, with a lap of 29.242 and an average speed of 130.251 mph (209.619 km/h).

Pos.	#	Driver	Team	Make	Time	Speed
1	32	Scott Pruett (R)	PPI Motorsports	Ford	29.242	130.251
2	10	Johnny Benson Jr.	Tyler Jet Motorsports	Pontiac	29.279	130.086
3	97	Chad Little	Roush Racing	Ford	29.358	129.736
Full second practice results

=== Third and final practice ===
The third and final practice session, sometimes referred to as Happy Hour, was held on Saturday, July 8, at 1:30 PM EST. The session would last for one hour. Kenny Wallace of Andy Petree Racing would set the fastest time in the session, with a lap of 29.386 and an average speed of 129.612 mph (208.590 km/h).

Pos.	#	Driver	Team	Make	Time	Speed
1	55	Kenny Wallace	Andy Petree Racing	Chevrolet	29.386	129.612
2	60	Geoff Bodine	Joe Bessey Racing	Chevrolet	29.428	129.427
3	25	Jerry Nadeau	Hendrick Motorsports	Chevrolet	29.497	129.124
Full Happy Hour practice results

== Qualifying ==
Qualifying was split into two rounds. The first round was held on Friday, July 7, at 2:30 PM EST. Each driver would have two laps to set a fastest time; the fastest of the two would count as their official qualifying lap. During the first round, the top 25 drivers in the round would be guaranteed a starting spot in the race. If a driver was not able to guarantee a spot in the first round, they had the option to scrub their time from the first round and try and run a faster lap time in a second round qualifying run, held on Saturday, July 8, at 11:00 AM EST. As with the first round, each driver would have two laps to set a fastest time; the fastest of the two would count as their official qualifying lap. Positions 26-36 would be decided on time, while positions 37-43 would be based on provisionals. Six spots are awarded by the use of provisionals based on owner's points. The seventh is awarded to a past champion who has not otherwise qualified for the race. If no past champion needs the provisional, the next team in the owner points will be awarded a provisional.

Rusty Wallace of Penske-Kranefuss Racing would win the pole, setting a time of 28.835 and an average speed of 132.089 miles per hour (212.577 km/h).

Dave Marcis was the only driver to fail to qualify.

=== Full qualifying results ===
Pos.	#	Driver	Team	Make	Time	Speed
1	2	Rusty Wallace	Penske-Kranefuss Racing	Ford	28.835	132.089
2	43	John Andretti	Petty Enterprises	Pontiac	28.948	131.574
3	6	Mark Martin	Roush Racing	Ford	28.969	131.478
4	99	Jeff Burton	Roush Racing	Ford	28.972	131.465
5	50	Ricky Craven	Midwest Transit Racing	Chevrolet	28.986	131.401
6	20	Tony Stewart (R)	Joe Gibbs Racing	Pontiac	29.034	131.184
7	36	Ken Schrader	MB2 Motorsports	Pontiac	29.066	131.040
8	24	Jeff Gordon	Hendrick Motorsports	Chevrolet	29.068	131.031
9	25	Jerry Nadeau	Hendrick Motorsports	Chevrolet	29.080	130.977
10	88	Dale Jarrett	Robert Yates Racing	Ford	29.106	130.860
11	14	Rick Mast	A. J. Foyt Enterprises	Pontiac	29.111	130.837
12	22	Ward Burton	Bill Davis Racing	Pontiac	29.114	130.824
13	11	Brett Bodine	Brett Bodine Racing	Ford	29.114	130.824
14	28	Ricky Rudd	Robert Yates Racing	Ford	29.122	130.788
15	94	Bill Elliott	Bill Elliott Racing	Ford	29.129	130.756
16	12	Jeremy Mayfield	Penske-Kranefuss Racing	Ford	29.133	130.738
17	60	Geoff Bodine	Joe Bessey Racing	Chevrolet	29.133	130.738
18	26	Jimmy Spencer	Haas-Carter Motorsports	Ford	29.188	130.492
19	55	Kenny Wallace	Andy Petree Racing	Chevrolet	29.213	130.380
20	18	Bobby Labonte	Joe Gibbs Racing	Pontiac	29.225	130.327
21	77	Robert Pressley	Jasper Motorsports	Ford	29.255	130.193
22	17	Matt Kenseth (R)	Roush Racing	Ford	29.261	130.166
23	1	Steve Park	Dale Earnhardt, Inc.	Chevrolet	29.266	130.144
24	3	Dale Earnhardt	Richard Childress Racing	Chevrolet	29.270	130.126
25	27	Mike Bliss (R)	Eel River Racing	Pontiac	29.307	129.962
26	8	Dale Earnhardt Jr. (R)	Dale Earnhardt, Inc.	Chevrolet	29.364	129.710
27	66	Darrell Waltrip	Haas-Carter Motorsports	Ford	29.374	129.666
28	16	Kevin Lepage	Roush Racing	Ford	29.389	129.600
29	93	Dave Blaney	Bill Davis Racing	Pontiac	29.447	129.344
30	33	Joe Nemechek	Andy Petree Racing	Chevrolet	29.452	129.322
31	31	Mike Skinner	Richard Childress Racing	Chevrolet	29.454	129.314
32	5	Terry Labonte	Hendrick Motorsports	Chevrolet	29.468	129.252
33	21	Elliott Sadler	Wood Brothers Racing	Ford	29.532	129.011
34	97	Chad Little	Roush Racing	Ford	29.573	128.793
35	32	Scott Pruett (R)	PPI Motorsports	Ford	29.579	128.767
36	4	Bobby Hamilton	Morgan–McClure Motorsports	Chevrolet	29.625	128.567
Provisionals
37	40	Sterling Marlin	Team SABCO	Chevrolet	29.743	128.057
38	10	Johnny Benson Jr.	Tyler Jet Motorsports	Pontiac	29.775	127.919
39	7	Michael Waltrip	Mattei Motorsports	Chevrolet	29.674	128.355
40	44	Steve Grissom	Petty Enterprises	Pontiac	29.792	127.846
41	75	Wally Dallenbach Jr.	Galaxy Motorsports	Ford	29.821	127.722
42	9	Stacy Compton (R)	Melling Racing	Ford	29.821	127.722
43	90	Ed Berrier (R)	Donlavey Racing	Ford	30.652	124.259
Failed to qualify or withdrew
44	71	Dave Marcis	Marcis Auto Racing	Chevrolet	29.911	127.338
WD	42	Kenny Irwin Jr.	Team SABCO	Chevrolet	-	-
Official first round qualifying results
Official starting lineup

== Race results ==
Fin	St	#	Driver	Team	Make	Laps	Led	Status	Pts	Winnings
1	6	20	Tony Stewart	Joe Gibbs Racing	Pontiac	273	156	running	185	$164,800
2	30	33	Joe Nemechek	Andy Petree Racing	Chevrolet	273	3	running	175	$107,550
3	3	6	Mark Martin	Roush Racing	Ford	273	13	running	170	$81,200
4	9	25	Jerry Nadeau	Hendrick Motorsports	Chevrolet	273	2	running	165	$73,825
5	8	24	Jeff Gordon	Hendrick Motorsports	Chevrolet	273	0	running	155	$74,375
6	24	3	Dale Earnhardt	Richard Childress Racing	Chevrolet	273	0	running	150	$69,425
7	10	88	Dale Jarrett	Robert Yates Racing	Ford	273	1	running	151	$70,725
8	16	12	Jeremy Mayfield	Penske-Kranefuss Racing	Ford	273	10	running	147	$56,125
9	20	18	Bobby Labonte	Joe Gibbs Racing	Pontiac	273	2	running	143	$64,125
10	14	28	Ricky Rudd	Robert Yates Racing	Ford	273	0	running	134	$68,925
11	4	99	Jeff Burton	Roush Racing	Ford	273	1	running	135	$63,125
12	11	14	Rick Mast	A. J. Foyt Enterprises	Pontiac	273	0	running	127	$45,025
13	17	60	Geoff Bodine	Joe Bessey Racing	Chevrolet	273	20	running	129	$55,325
14	38	10	Johnny Benson Jr.	Tyler Jet Motorsports	Pontiac	272	0	running	121	$50,525
15	1	2	Rusty Wallace	Penske-Kranefuss Racing	Ford	272	1	running	123	$67,025
16	33	21	Elliott Sadler	Wood Brothers Racing	Ford	272	0	running	115	$57,325
17	5	50	Ricky Craven	Midwest Transit Racing	Chevrolet	272	63	running	117	$41,700
18	12	22	Ward Burton	Bill Davis Racing	Pontiac	272	0	running	109	$59,550
19	22	17	Matt Kenseth (R)	Roush Racing	Ford	272	0	running	106	$54,400
20	13	11	Brett Bodine	Brett Bodine Racing	Ford	272	0	running	103	$45,650
21	26	8	Dale Earnhardt Jr. (R)	Dale Earnhardt, Inc.	Chevrolet	272	0	running	100	$51,075
22	36	4	Bobby Hamilton	Morgan–McClure Motorsports	Chevrolet	272	0	running	97	$52,725
23	7	36	Ken Schrader	MB2 Motorsports	Pontiac	272	0	running	94	$44,475
24	15	94	Bill Elliott	Bill Elliott Racing	Ford	272	0	running	91	$52,225
25	37	40	Sterling Marlin	Team SABCO	Chevrolet	272	0	running	88	$52,375
26	19	55	Kenny Wallace	Andy Petree Racing	Chevrolet	272	0	running	85	$51,725
27	41	75	Wally Dallenbach Jr.	Galaxy Motorsports	Ford	271	0	running	82	$43,450
28	23	1	Steve Park	Dale Earnhardt, Inc.	Chevrolet	271	0	running	79	$51,200
29	42	9	Stacy Compton (R)	Melling Racing	Ford	271	0	running	76	$42,950
30	35	32	Scott Pruett (R)	PPI Motorsports	Ford	271	0	running	73	$40,225
31	28	16	Kevin Lepage	Roush Racing	Ford	271	0	running	70	$50,600
32	25	27	Mike Bliss (R)	Eel River Racing	Pontiac	270	0	running	67	$39,475
33	27	66	Darrell Waltrip	Haas-Carter Motorsports	Ford	270	0	running	64	$42,350
34	29	93	Dave Blaney	Bill Davis Racing	Pontiac	270	0	running	61	$39,225
35	39	7	Michael Waltrip	Mattei Motorsports	Chevrolet	270	0	running	58	$49,600
36	40	44	Steve Grissom	Petty Enterprises	Pontiac	268	0	running	55	$46,975
37	43	90	Ed Berrier (R)	Donlavey Racing	Ford	267	0	running	52	$38,850
38	21	77	Robert Pressley	Jasper Motorsports	Ford	162	0	electrical	49	$38,750
39	31	31	Mike Skinner	Richard Childress Racing	Chevrolet	155	0	running	46	$46,725
40	2	43	John Andretti	Petty Enterprises	Pontiac	109	1	engine	48	$59,175
41	18	26	Jimmy Spencer	Haas-Carter Motorsports	Ford	98	0	crash	40	$46,650
42	34	97	Chad Little	Roush Racing	Ford	5	0	crash	37	$46,625
43	32	5	Terry Labonte	Hendrick Motorsports	Chevrolet	5	0	crash	34	$56,600
Official race results

Previous race: 2000 Pepsi 400	NASCAR Winston Cup Series; 2000 season	Next race: 2000 Pennsylvania 500
