= 2000 Save Mart/Kragen 350 =

16th race of the 2000 NASCAR Winston Cup Series

Race details
- Race 16 of 34 in the 2000 NASCAR Winston Cup Series
- The 2000 Save Mart/Kragen 350 program cover, featuring Jeff Gordon.
- Date: June 25, 2000
- Official name: 12th Annual Save Mart/Kragen 350
- Location: Sonoma, California, Sears Point Raceway
- Course: Permanent racing facility
- Course length: 1.99 miles (3.20 km)
- Distance: 112 laps, 218.288 mi (351.3 km)
- Scheduled distance: 112 laps, 218.288 mi (351.3 km)
- Average speed: 78.789 miles per hour (126.799 km/h)

Pole position
Driver	Rusty Wallace	Penske-Kranefuss Racing
- Time: 1:10.652

Most laps led
Driver	Jeff Gordon	Hendrick Motorsports
- Laps: 43

Winner
No. 24	Jeff Gordon	Hendrick Motorsports

Television in the United States
- Network: ESPN
- Announcers: Bob Jenkins, Ned Jarrett, Benny Parsons

Radio in the United States
- Radio: Performance Racing Network

The 2000 Save Mart/Kragen 350 was the 16th stock car race of the 2000 NASCAR Winston Cup Series and the 12th iteration of the event. The race was held on Sunday, June 25, 2000, in Sonoma, California, at the club layout in Sears Point Raceway, a 1.99 miles (3.20 km) permanent road course layout. The race took the scheduled 112 laps to complete.

At race's end, Hendrick Motorsports driver Jeff Gordon would dominate the late stages of a chaotic race to win his 51st career NASCAR Winston Cup Series win and his second of the season. To fill out the podium, Sterling Marlin of Team SABCO and Mark Martin of Roush Racing would finish second and third, respectively.

== Background ==
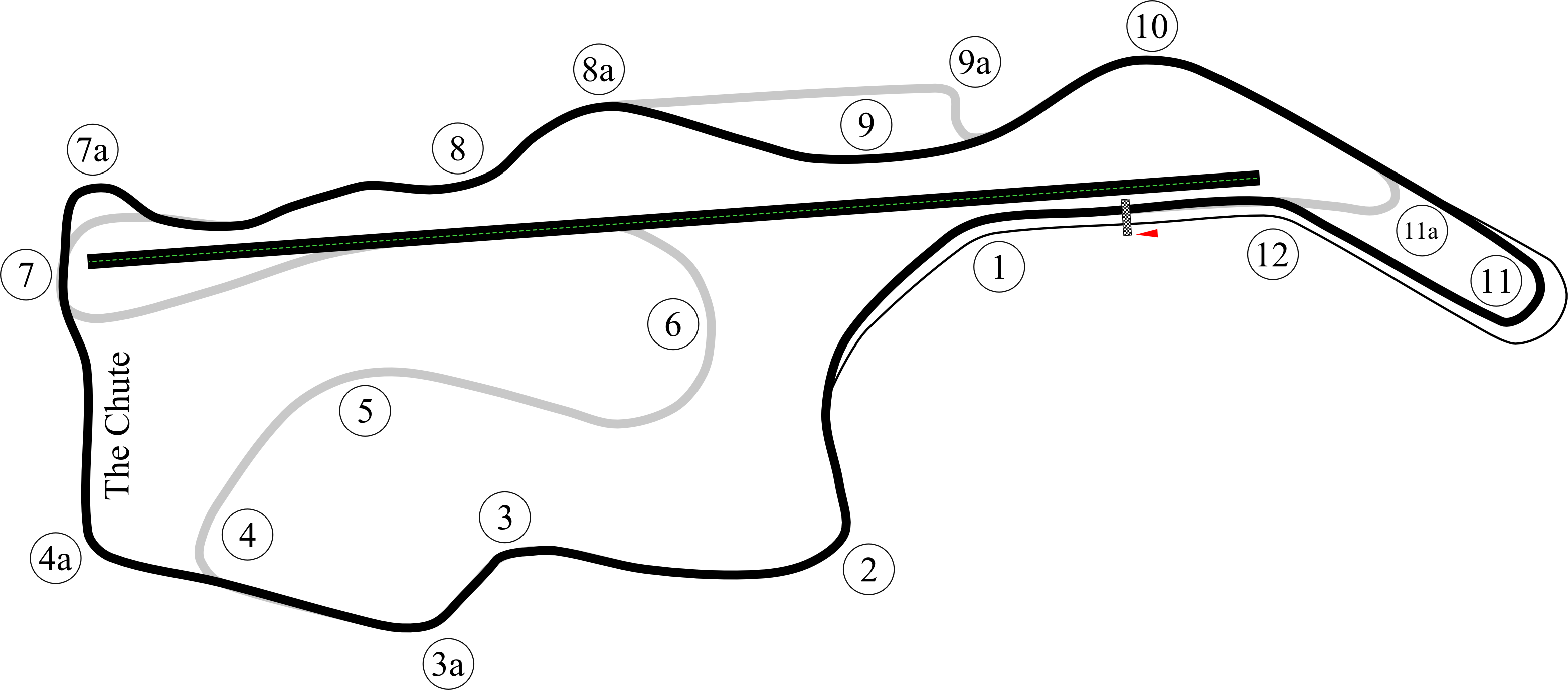
The layout of Sears Point Raceway used by NASCAR at the time.

Sears Point Raceway is one of two road courses to hold NASCAR races, the other being Watkins Glen International. The standard road course at Sears Point Raceway is a 12-turn course that is 2.52 miles (4.06 km) long; the track was modified in 1998, adding the Chute, which bypassed turns 5 and 6, shortening the course to 1.95 miles (3.14 km). The Chute was only used for NASCAR events such as this race, and was criticized by many drivers, who preferred the full layout. In 2001, it was replaced with a 70-degree turn, 4A, bringing the track to its current dimensions of 1.99 miles (3.20 km).

=== Entry list ===
- (R) denotes rookie driver.

#	Driver	Team	Make
1	Steve Park	Dale Earnhardt, Inc.	Chevrolet
2	Rusty Wallace	Penske-Kranefuss Racing	Ford
3	Dale Earnhardt	Richard Childress Racing	Chevrolet
4	Bobby Hamilton	Morgan–McClure Motorsports	Chevrolet
5	Terry Labonte	Hendrick Motorsports	Chevrolet
6	Mark Martin	Roush Racing	Ford
7	Michael Waltrip	Mattei Motorsports	Chevrolet
8	Dale Earnhardt Jr. (R)	Dale Earnhardt, Inc.	Chevrolet
9	Stacy Compton (R)	Melling Racing	Ford
10	Johnny Benson Jr.	Tyler Jet Motorsports	Pontiac
11	Brett Bodine	Brett Bodine Racing	Ford
12	Jeremy Mayfield	Penske-Kranefuss Racing	Ford
13	Robby Gordon	Team Menard	Ford
14	Rick Mast	A. J. Foyt Enterprises	Pontiac
16	Kevin Lepage	Roush Racing	Ford
17	Matt Kenseth (R)	Roush Racing	Ford
18	Bobby Labonte	Joe Gibbs Racing	Pontiac
20	Tony Stewart	Joe Gibbs Racing	Pontiac
21	Elliott Sadler	Wood Brothers Racing	Ford
22	Ward Burton	Bill Davis Racing	Pontiac
23	Boris Said	Spencer Motor Ventures	Ford
24	Jeff Gordon	Hendrick Motorsports	Chevrolet
25	Jerry Nadeau	Hendrick Motorsports	Chevrolet
26	Jimmy Spencer	Haas-Carter Motorsports	Ford
27	Mike Bliss (R)	Eel River Racing	Pontiac
28	Ricky Rudd	Robert Yates Racing	Ford
31	Mike Skinner	Richard Childress Racing	Chevrolet
32	Scott Pruett (R)	PPI Motorsports	Ford
33	Joe Nemechek	Andy Petree Racing	Chevrolet
36	Ken Schrader	MB2 Motorsports	Pontiac
40	Sterling Marlin	Team SABCO	Chevrolet
42	Kenny Irwin Jr.	Team SABCO	Chevrolet
43	John Andretti	Petty Enterprises	Pontiac
44	Kyle Petty	Petty Enterprises	Pontiac
55	Kenny Wallace	Andy Petree Racing	Chevrolet
60	Geoff Bodine	Joe Bessey Racing	Chevrolet
66	Darrell Waltrip	Haas-Carter Motorsports	Ford
71	R. K. Smith	Marcis Auto Racing	Chevrolet
75	Wally Dallenbach Jr.	Galaxy Motorsports	Ford
77	Robert Pressley	Jasper Motorsports	Ford
88	Dale Jarrett	Robert Yates Racing	Ford
90	Brian Simo	Donlavey Racing	Ford
93	Dave Blaney (R)	Bill Davis Racing	Pontiac
94	Bill Elliott	Bill Elliott Racing	Ford
97	Chad Little	Roush Racing	Ford
99	Jeff Burton	Roush Racing	Ford
Official entry list

== Practice ==
=== First practice ===
The first practice session was held on Friday, June 23, at 10:00 AM PST, and would last for three hours. Kyle Petty of Petty Enterprises would set the fastest time in the session, with a lap of 1:10.921 and an average speed of 98.932 mph (159.216 km/h).

Pos.	#	Driver	Team	Make	Time	Speed
1	44	Kyle Petty	Petty Enterprises	Pontiac	1:10.921	98.932
2	23	Boris Said	Spencer Motor Ventures	Ford	1:10.988	98.839
3	13	Robby Gordon	Team Menard	Ford	1:11.024	98.789
Full first practice results

=== Second practice ===
The second practice session was held on Saturday, June 24, at 9:00 AM PST, and would last for one hour. Dale Earnhardt of Richard Childress Racing would set the fastest time in the session, with a lap of 1:11.747 and an average speed of 97.793 mph (157.383 km/h).

Pos.	#	Driver	Team	Make	Time	Speed
1	3	Dale Earnhardt	Richard Childress Racing	Chevrolet	1:11.747	97.793
2	99	Jeff Burton	Roush Racing	Ford	1:11.801	97.720
3	25	Jerry Nadeau	Hendrick Motorsports	Chevrolet	1:11.908	97.574
Full second practice results

=== Third and final practice ===
The third and final practice session, sometimes referred to as Happy Hour, was held on Saturday, June 24 after the preliminary NASCAR Featherlite Southwest Series race. John Andretti of Petty Enterprises would set the fastest time in the session, with a lap of 1:12.510 and an average speed of 96.764 mph (155.727 km/h).

Pos.	#	Driver	Team	Make	Time	Speed
1	43	John Andretti	Petty Enterprises	Pontiac	1:12.510	96.764
2	32	Scott Pruett (R)	PPI Motorsports	Ford	1:12.530	96.737
3	6	Mark Martin	Roush Racing	Ford	1:12.799	96.380
Full Happy Hour practice results

== Qualifying ==
Qualifying was split into two rounds. The first round was held on Friday, June 23, at 2:00 PM PST. each driver had one lap to set a time. During the first round, the top 25 drivers in the round were guaranteed a starting spot in the race. If a driver was not able to guarantee a spot in the first round, they had the option to scrub their time from the first round and try and run a faster lap time in a second round qualifying run, held on Saturday, June 24, at 10:45 AM PST. As with the first round, each driver had one lap to set a time. Positions 26-36 were decided on time, while positions 37-43 were based on provisionals. Six spots were awarded by the use of provisionals based on owner's points. The seventh was awarded to a past champion who did not otherwise qualified for the race. If no past champion needs the provisional, the next team in the owner points was awarded a provisional.

Rusty Wallace of Penske-Kranefuss Racing won the pole, setting a time of 1:10.652 and an average speed of 99.309 miles per hour (159.822 km/h) in the first round.

Three drivers would fail to qualify: Rick Mast, Geoff Bodine, and R. K. Smith.

=== Full qualifying results ===
Pos.	#	Driver	Team	Make	Time	Speed
1	2	Rusty Wallace	Penske-Kranefuss Racing	Ford	1:10.652	99.309
2	44	Kyle Petty	Petty Enterprises	Pontiac	1:11.132	98.639
3	18	Bobby Labonte	Joe Gibbs Racing	Pontiac	1:11.146	98.620
4	20	Tony Stewart	Joe Gibbs Racing	Pontiac	1:11.201	98.544
5	24	Jeff Gordon	Hendrick Motorsports	Chevrolet	1:11.207	98.535
6	40	Sterling Marlin	Team SABCO	Chevrolet	1:11.236	98.495
7	6	Mark Martin	Roush Racing	Ford	1:11.257	98.466
8	94	Bill Elliott	Bill Elliott Racing	Ford	1:11.307	98.397
9	32	Scott Pruett (R)	PPI Motorsports	Ford	1:11.361	98.323
10	28	Ricky Rudd	Robert Yates Racing	Ford	1:11.425	98.235
11	13	Robby Gordon	Team Menard	Ford	1:11.488	98.148
12	26	Jimmy Spencer	Haas-Carter Motorsports	Ford	1:11.529	98.092
13	31	Mike Skinner	Richard Childress Racing	Chevrolet	1:11.574	98.030
14	4	Bobby Hamilton	Morgan–McClure Motorsports	Chevrolet	1:11.617	97.971
15	1	Steve Park	Dale Earnhardt, Inc.	Chevrolet	1:11.619	97.968
16	43	John Andretti	Petty Enterprises	Pontiac	1:11.718	97.833
17	55	Kenny Wallace	Andy Petree Racing	Chevrolet	1:11.750	97.790
18	88	Dale Jarrett	Robert Yates Racing	Ford	1:11.763	97.772
19	33	Joe Nemechek	Andy Petree Racing	Chevrolet	1:11.771	97.761
20	25	Jerry Nadeau	Hendrick Motorsports	Chevrolet	1:11.794	97.730
21	36	Ken Schrader	MB2 Motorsports	Pontiac	1:11.809	97.709
22	11	Brett Bodine	Brett Bodine Racing	Ford	1:11.834	97.675
23	23	Boris Said	Spencer Motor Ventures	Ford	1:11.922	97.556
24	16	Kevin Lepage	Roush Racing	Ford	1:12.070	97.355
25	5	Terry Labonte	Hendrick Motorsports	Chevrolet	1:12.160	97.234
26	75	Wally Dallenbach Jr.	Galaxy Motorsports	Ford	1:11.776	97.754
27	27	Mike Bliss (R)	Eel River Racing	Pontiac	1:11.825	97.687
28	7	Michael Waltrip	Mattei Motorsports	Chevrolet	1:11.885	97.606
29	3	Dale Earnhardt	Richard Childress Racing	Chevrolet	1:12.086	97.334
30	99	Jeff Burton	Roush Racing	Ford	1:12.139	97.262
31	8	Dale Earnhardt Jr. (R)	Dale Earnhardt, Inc.	Chevrolet	1:12.214	97.161
32	21	Elliott Sadler	Wood Brothers Racing	Ford	1:12.232	97.137
33	66	Darrell Waltrip	Haas-Carter Motorsports	Ford	1:12.270	97.086
34	90	Brian Simo	Donlavey Racing	Ford	1:12.389	96.926
35	10	Johnny Benson Jr.	Tyler Jet Motorsports	Pontiac	1:12.414	96.893
36	9	Stacy Compton (R)	Melling Racing	Ford	1:12.486	96.797
Provisionals
37	22	Ward Burton	Bill Davis Racing	Pontiac	1:12.624	96.613
38	17	Matt Kenseth (R)	Roush Racing	Ford	1:13.193	95.862
39	12	Jeremy Mayfield	Penske-Kranefuss Racing	Ford	1:12.516	96.757
40	97	Chad Little	Roush Racing	Ford	1:13.285	95.741
41	77	Mark Simo (Note: Pressley was replaced by Simo in an attempt to qualify the car. Pressley was eventually reinstated to run the race.)	Jasper Motorsports	Ford	1:13.050	96.049
42	42	Kenny Irwin Jr.	Team SABCO	Chevrolet	1:12.554	96.706
43	93	Dave Blaney (R)	Bill Davis Racing	Pontiac	1:12.990	96.128
Failed to qualify
44	14	Rick Mast	A. J. Foyt Enterprises	Pontiac	1:12.576	96.677
45	60	Geoff Bodine	Joe Bessey Racing	Chevrolet	1:12.783	96.402
46	71	R. K. Smith	Marcis Auto Racing	Chevrolet	1:12.862	96.297
Official first round qualifying results
Official starting lineup

== Race results ==
Fin	St	#	Driver	Team	Make	Laps	Led	Status	Pts	Winnings
1	5	24	Jeff Gordon	Hendrick Motorsports	Chevrolet	112	43	running	185	$143,025
2	6	40	Sterling Marlin	Team SABCO	Chevrolet	112	25	running	175	$90,725
3	7	6	Mark Martin	Roush Racing	Ford	112	0	running	165	$75,950
4	3	18	Bobby Labonte	Joe Gibbs Racing	Pontiac	112	0	running	160	$81,290
5	10	28	Ricky Rudd	Robert Yates Racing	Ford	112	0	running	155	$67,915
6	29	3	Dale Earnhardt	Richard Childress Racing	Chevrolet	112	0	running	150	$65,165
7	18	88	Dale Jarrett	Robert Yates Racing	Ford	112	0	running	146	$69,665
8	20	25	Jerry Nadeau	Hendrick Motorsports	Chevrolet	112	0	running	142	$56,765
9	11	13	Robby Gordon	Team Menard	Ford	112	5	running	143	$42,415
10	4	20	Tony Stewart	Joe Gibbs Racing	Pontiac	112	2	running	139	$73,610
11	19	33	Joe Nemechek	Andy Petree Racing	Chevrolet	112	0	running	130	$55,700
12	28	7	Michael Waltrip	Mattei Motorsports	Chevrolet	112	0	running	127	$53,475
13	17	55	Kenny Wallace	Andy Petree Racing	Chevrolet	112	16	running	129	$53,325
14	14	4	Bobby Hamilton	Morgan–McClure Motorsports	Chevrolet	112	0	running	121	$51,775
15	21	36	Ken Schrader	MB2 Motorsports	Pontiac	112	0	running	118	$45,775
16	30	99	Jeff Burton	Roush Racing	Ford	112	0	running	115	$59,225
17	15	1	Steve Park	Dale Earnhardt, Inc.	Chevrolet	112	0	running	112	$50,200
18	35	10	Johnny Benson Jr.	Tyler Jet Motorsports	Pontiac	112	0	running	109	$45,775
19	2	44	Kyle Petty	Petty Enterprises	Pontiac	112	0	running	106	$50,420
20	13	31	Mike Skinner	Richard Childress Racing	Chevrolet	112	0	running	103	$53,685
21	37	22	Ward Burton	Bill Davis Racing	Pontiac	112	0	running	100	$55,725
22	27	27	Mike Bliss (R)	Eel River Racing	Pontiac	112	0	running	97	$38,665
23	42	42	Kenny Irwin Jr.	Team SABCO	Chevrolet	112	0	running	94	$49,030
24	31	8	Dale Earnhardt Jr. (R)	Dale Earnhardt, Inc.	Chevrolet	112	0	running	91	$47,550
25	40	97	Chad Little	Roush Racing	Ford	112	0	running	88	$49,230
26	1	2	Rusty Wallace	Penske-Kranefuss Racing	Ford	112	11	running	90	$61,500
27	25	5	Terry Labonte	Hendrick Motorsports	Chevrolet	112	0	running	82	$55,465
28	33	66	Darrell Waltrip	Haas-Carter Motorsports	Ford	111	0	running	79	$40,580
29	43	93	Dave Blaney (R)	Bill Davis Racing	Pontiac	111	0	running	76	$37,360
30	22	11	Brett Bodine	Brett Bodine Racing	Ford	110	0	running	73	$37,820
31	36	9	Stacy Compton (R)	Melling Racing	Ford	110	0	running	70	$40,950
32	38	17	Matt Kenseth (R)	Roush Racing	Ford	110	0	running	67	$48,190
33	39	12	Jeremy Mayfield	Penske-Kranefuss Racing	Ford	110	0	running	64	$48,170
34	12	26	Jimmy Spencer	Haas-Carter Motorsports	Ford	110	0	running	61	$47,650
35	8	94	Bill Elliott	Bill Elliott Racing	Ford	98	0	running	58	$45,130
36	34	90	Brian Simo	Donlavey Racing	Ford	95	0	running	55	$37,110
37	41	77	Robert Pressley	Jasper Motorsports	Ford	91	0	transmission	52	$37,090
38	32	21	Elliott Sadler	Wood Brothers Racing	Ford	91	0	running	49	$45,045
39	9	32	Scott Pruett (R)	PPI Motorsports	Ford	67	10	crash	51	$37,025
40	26	75	Wally Dallenbach Jr.	Galaxy Motorsports	Ford	44	0	transmission	43	$37,480
41	24	16	Kevin Lepage	Roush Racing	Ford	40	0	transmission	40	$44,960
42	23	23	Boris Said	Spencer Motor Ventures	Ford	26	0	engine	37	$36,940
43	16	43	John Andretti	Petty Enterprises	Pontiac	15	0	crash	34	$54,915
Official race results

== Standings after the race ==
Drivers' Championship standings

	Pos	Driver	Points
	1	Bobby Labonte	2,400
	2	Dale Earnhardt	2,333 (−67)
	3	Dale Jarrett	2,271 (−129)
	4	Ward Burton	2,196 (−204)
	5	Jeff Burton	2,134 (−266)
2	6	Ricky Rudd	2,130 (−270)
2	7	Mark Martin	2,123 (−277)
1	8	Tony Stewart	2,115 (−285)
3	9	Rusty Wallace	2,089 (−311)
	10	Jeff Gordon	2,059 (−341)
Official driver's standings

- Note: Only the first 10 positions are included for the driver standings.

== Notes ==
Previous race: 2000 Pocono 500	NASCAR Winston Cup Series; 2000 season	Next race: 2000 Pepsi 400
