= 2000 Pepsi 400 =

17th race of the 2000 NASCAR Winston Cup Series

Race details
- Race 17 of 34 in the 2000 NASCAR Winston Cup Series
- The 2000 Pepsi 400 program cover.
- Date: July 1, 2000
- Official name: 42nd Annual Pepsi 400
- Location: Daytona Beach, Florida, Daytona International Speedway
- Course: Permanent racing facility
- Course length: 2.5 miles (4.0 km)
- Distance: 160 laps, 400 mi (643.737 km)
- Average speed: 148.576 miles per hour (239.110 km/h)

Pole position
Driver	Dale Jarrett	Robert Yates Racing
- Time: 47.988

Most laps led
Driver	Dale Jarrett	Robert Yates Racing
- Laps: 56

Winner
No. 99	Jeff Burton	Roush Racing

Television in the United States
- Network: CBS
- Announcers: Mike Joy, Buddy Baker, Ned Jarrett

Radio in the United States
- Radio: Motor Racing Network

The 2000 Pepsi 400 was the 17th stock car race of the 2000 NASCAR Winston Cup Series and the 42nd iteration of the event. The race was held on Saturday, July 1, 2000, in Daytona Beach, Florida at Daytona International Speedway, a 2.5-mile (4.0 km) permanent triangular-shaped superspeedway. The race took the scheduled 160 laps to complete. At race's end, Jeff Burton, driving for Roush Racing, would fiercely defend the lead on the final restart with four to go to win a chaotic race. The win was Burton's 13th career NASCAR Winston Cup Series win and his second of the season. To fill out the podium, Dale Jarrett of Robert Yates Racing and Rusty Wallace of Penske-Kranefuss Racing would finish second and third, respectively.

== Background ==
The layout of Daytona International Speedway, the venue where the race was held.

Daytona International Speedway is one of three superspeedways to hold NASCAR races, the other two being Indianapolis Motor Speedway and Talladega Superspeedway. The standard track at Daytona International Speedway is a four-turn superspeedway that is 2.5 miles (4.0 km) long. The track's turns are banked at 31 degrees, while the front stretch, the location of the finish line, is banked at 18 degrees.

=== Entry list ===
- (R) denotes rookie driver.

#	Driver	Team	Make
1	Steve Park	Dale Earnhardt, Inc.	Chevrolet
2	Rusty Wallace	Penske-Kranefuss Racing	Ford
3	Dale Earnhardt	Richard Childress Racing	Chevrolet
4	Bobby Hamilton	Morgan–McClure Motorsports	Chevrolet
5	Terry Labonte	Hendrick Motorsports	Chevrolet
6	Mark Martin	Roush Racing	Ford
7	Michael Waltrip	Mattei Motorsports	Chevrolet
8	Dale Earnhardt Jr. (R)	Dale Earnhardt, Inc.	Chevrolet
9	Stacy Compton (R)	Melling Racing	Ford
10	Johnny Benson Jr.	Tyler Jet Motorsports	Pontiac
11	Brett Bodine	Brett Bodine Racing	Ford
12	Jeremy Mayfield	Penske-Kranefuss Racing	Ford
13	Robby Gordon	Team Menard	Ford
14	Rick Mast	A. J. Foyt Enterprises	Pontiac
15	Ted Musgrave	Fenley-Moore Motorsports	Ford
16	Kevin Lepage	Roush Racing	Ford
17	Matt Kenseth (R)	Roush Racing	Ford
18	Bobby Labonte	Joe Gibbs Racing	Pontiac
20	Tony Stewart	Joe Gibbs Racing	Pontiac
21	Elliott Sadler	Wood Brothers Racing	Ford
22	Ward Burton	Bill Davis Racing	Pontiac
23	Boris Said	Spencer Motor Ventures	Ford
24	Jeff Gordon	Hendrick Motorsports	Chevrolet
25	Jerry Nadeau	Hendrick Motorsports	Chevrolet
26	Jimmy Spencer	Haas-Carter Motorsports	Ford
27	Mike Bliss (R)	Eel River Racing	Pontiac
28	Ricky Rudd	Robert Yates Racing	Ford
31	Mike Skinner	Richard Childress Racing	Chevrolet
32	Scott Pruett (R)	PPI Motorsports	Ford
33	Joe Nemechek	Andy Petree Racing	Chevrolet
36	Ken Schrader	MB2 Motorsports	Pontiac
40	Sterling Marlin	Team SABCO	Chevrolet
42	Kenny Irwin Jr.	Team SABCO	Chevrolet
43	John Andretti	Petty Enterprises	Pontiac
44	Kyle Petty	Petty Enterprises	Pontiac
50	Ricky Craven	Midwest Transit Racing	Chevrolet
55	Kenny Wallace	Andy Petree Racing	Chevrolet
60	Geoff Bodine	Joe Bessey Racing	Chevrolet
66	Darrell Waltrip	Haas-Carter Motorsports	Ford
71	Dave Marcis	Marcis Auto Racing	Chevrolet
75	Wally Dallenbach Jr.	Galaxy Motorsports	Ford
77	Robert Pressley	Jasper Motorsports	Ford
88	Dale Jarrett	Robert Yates Racing	Ford
90	Ed Berrier (R)	Donlavey Racing	Ford
93	Dave Blaney (R)	Bill Davis Racing	Pontiac
94	Bill Elliott	Bill Elliott Racing	Ford
97	Chad Little	Roush Racing	Ford
99	Jeff Burton	Roush Racing	Ford
Official entry list

== Practice ==
=== First practice ===
The first practice session was held on Thursday, June 29, and was delayed until 5:00 PM EST due to rain. The session lasted for around an hour and 30 minutes. Ricky Rudd of Robert Yates Racing would set the fastest time in the session, with a lap of 48.272 and an average speed of 186.443 miles per hour (300.051 km/h).

Pos.	#	Driver	Team	Make	Time	Speed
1	28	Ricky Rudd	Robert Yates Racing	Ford	48.272	186.443
2	10	Johnny Benson Jr.	Tyler Jet Motorsports	Pontiac	48.374	186.050
3	88	Dale Jarrett	Robert Yates Racing	Ford	48.375	186.047
Full first practice results

=== Second practice ===
The second practice session was held on Friday, June 30, at 3:00 PM EST. The session would last for two hours and 30 minutes. Bill Elliott of Bill Elliott Racing would set the fastest time in the session, with a lap of 47.515 and an average speed of 189.414 miles per hour (304.832 km/h).

Pos.	#	Driver	Team	Make	Time	Speed
1	94	Bill Elliott	Bill Elliott Racing	Ford	47.515	189.414
2	31	Mike Skinner	Richard Childress Racing	Chevrolet	47.520	189.394
3	77	Robert Pressley	Jasper Motorsports	Ford	47.559	189.234
Full second practice results

=== Third and final practice ===
The third and final practice session, sometimes referred to as Happy Hour, was held on Friday, June 30, at 8:00 PM EST. The session would last for one hour. Mark Martin of Roush Racing would set the fastest time in the session, with a lap of 47.337 and an average speed of 190.126 miles per hour (305.978 km/h).

Pos.	#	Driver	Team	Make	Time	Speed
1	6	Mark Martin	Roush Racing	Ford	47.337	190.126
2	99	Jeff Burton	Roush Racing	Ford	47.446	189.689
3	22	Ward Burton	Bill Davis Racing	Pontiac	47.475	189.573
Full Happy Hour practice results

== Qualifying ==
Qualifying was split into two rounds. The first round was held on Friday, June 29, at 8:00 PM EST. Each driver would have two laps to set a fastest time; the fastest of the two would count as their official qualifying lap. During the first round, the top 25 drivers in the round would be guaranteed a starting spot in the race. If a driver was not able to guarantee a spot in the first round, they had the option to scrub their time from the first round and try and run a faster lap time in a second round qualifying run, held on Saturday, June 30, at 6:30 PM EST. As with the first round, each driver would have two laps to set a fastest time; the fastest of the two would count as their official qualifying lap. Positions 26-36 would be decided on time, while positions 37-43 would be based on provisionals. Six spots are awarded by the use of provisionals based on owner's points. The seventh is awarded to a past champion who has not otherwise qualified for the race. If no past champion needs the provisional, the next team in the owner points will be awarded a provisional.

Dale Jarrett of Robert Yates Racing would win the pole, setting a time of 47.988 and an average speed of 187.547 miles per hour (301.828 km/h).

Three drivers would fail to qualify: Brett Bodine, Robby Gordon, and Dave Marcis. Ted Musgrave and Boris Said had withdrawn from the entry list earlier in the week.

=== Full qualifying results ===
Pos.	#	Driver	Team	Make	Time	Speed
1	88	Dale Jarrett	Robert Yates Racing	Ford	47.988	187.547
2	28	Ricky Rudd	Robert Yates Racing	Ford	48.097	187.122
3	94	Bill Elliott	Bill Elliott Racing	Ford	48.163	186.865
4	93	Dave Blaney (R)	Bill Davis Racing	Pontiac	48.212	186.676
5	6	Mark Martin	Roush Racing	Ford	48.332	186.212
6	22	Ward Burton	Bill Davis Racing	Pontiac	48.415	185.893
7	20	Tony Stewart	Joe Gibbs Racing	Pontiac	48.421	185.870
8	25	Jerry Nadeau	Hendrick Motorsports	Chevrolet	48.426	185.851
9	99	Jeff Burton	Roush Racing	Ford	48.457	185.732
10	21	Elliott Sadler	Wood Brothers Racing	Ford	48.560	185.338
11	90	Ed Berrier (R)	Donlavey Racing	Ford	48.574	185.284
12	2	Rusty Wallace	Penske-Kranefuss Racing	Ford	48.588	185.231
13	9	Stacy Compton (R)	Melling Racing	Ford	48.616	185.124
14	36	Ken Schrader	MB2 Motorsports	Pontiac	48.628	185.079
15	31	Mike Skinner	Richard Childress Racing	Chevrolet	48.635	185.052
16	44	Kyle Petty	Petty Enterprises	Pontiac	48.637	185.044
17	26	Jimmy Spencer	Haas-Carter Motorsports	Ford	48.658	184.964
18	3	Dale Earnhardt	Richard Childress Racing	Chevrolet	48.678	184.888
19	97	Chad Little	Roush Racing	Ford	48.686	184.858
20	10	Johnny Benson Jr.	Tyler Jet Motorsports	Pontiac	48.689	184.847
21	18	Bobby Labonte	Joe Gibbs Racing	Pontiac	48.717	184.740
22	17	Matt Kenseth (R)	Roush Racing	Ford	48.717	184.740
23	77	Robert Pressley	Jasper Motorsports	Ford	48.725	184.710
24	27	Mike Bliss (R)	Eel River Racing	Pontiac	48.726	184.706
25	14	Rick Mast	A. J. Foyt Enterprises	Pontiac	48.774	184.525
26	55	Kenny Wallace	Andy Petree Racing	Chevrolet	48.469	185.686
27	1	Steve Park	Dale Earnhardt, Inc.	Chevrolet	48.778	184.509
28	42	Kenny Irwin Jr.	Team SABCO	Chevrolet	48.791	184.460
29	43	John Andretti	Petty Enterprises	Pontiac	48.817	184.362
30	16	Kevin Lepage	Roush Racing	Ford	48.839	184.279
31	8	Dale Earnhardt Jr. (R)	Dale Earnhardt, Inc.	Chevrolet	48.882	184.117
32	50	Ricky Craven	Midwest Transit Racing	Chevrolet	48.910	184.011
33	66	Darrell Waltrip	Haas-Carter Motorsports	Ford	48.939	183.902
34	24	Jeff Gordon	Hendrick Motorsports	Chevrolet	48.943	183.887
35	75	Wally Dallenbach Jr.	Galaxy Motorsports	Ford	48.945	183.880
36	32	Scott Pruett (R)	PPI Motorsports	Ford	48.951	183.857
Provisionals
37	5	Terry Labonte	Hendrick Motorsports	Chevrolet	49.154	183.098
38	12	Jeremy Mayfield	Penske-Kranefuss Racing	Ford	49.015	183.617
39	40	Sterling Marlin	Team SABCO	Chevrolet	49.464	181.951
40	33	Joe Nemechek	Andy Petree Racing	Chevrolet	49.027	183.572
41	7	Michael Waltrip	Mattei Motorsports	Chevrolet	49.104	183.284
42	4	Bobby Hamilton	Morgan–McClure Motorsports	Chevrolet	49.030	183.561
43	60	Geoff Bodine	Joe Bessey Racing	Chevrolet	49.493	181.844
Failed to qualify
44	11	Brett Bodine	Brett Bodine Racing	Ford	48.966	183.801
45	71	Dave Marcis	Marcis Auto Racing	Chevrolet	48.975	183.767
46	13	Robby Gordon	Team Menard	Ford	49.115	183.243
Official first round qualifying results
Official starting lineup

== Race results ==
Fin	St	#	Driver	Team	Make	Laps	Led	Status	Pts	Winnings
1	9	99	Jeff Burton	Roush Racing	Ford	160	42	running	180	$152,450
2	1	88	Dale Jarrett	Robert Yates Racing	Ford	160	56	running	180	$126,350
3	12	2	Rusty Wallace	Penske-Kranefuss Racing	Ford	160	0	running	165	$88,750
4	5	6	Mark Martin	Roush Racing	Ford	160	0	running	160	$83,650
5	2	28	Ricky Rudd	Robert Yates Racing	Ford	160	0	running	155	$79,900
6	7	20	Tony Stewart	Joe Gibbs Racing	Pontiac	160	1	running	155	$71,425
7	6	22	Ward Burton	Bill Davis Racing	Pontiac	160	6	running	151	$68,775
8	18	3	Dale Earnhardt	Richard Childress Racing	Chevrolet	160	0	running	142	$64,375
9	15	31	Mike Skinner	Richard Childress Racing	Chevrolet	160	0	running	138	$58,375
10	34	24	Jeff Gordon	Hendrick Motorsports	Chevrolet	160	0	running	134	$74,675
11	40	33	Joe Nemechek	Andy Petree Racing	Chevrolet	160	0	running	130	$58,215
12	21	18	Bobby Labonte	Joe Gibbs Racing	Pontiac	160	0	running	127	$62,025
13	20	10	Johnny Benson Jr.	Tyler Jet Motorsports	Pontiac	160	11	running	129	$45,335
14	29	43	John Andretti	Petty Enterprises	Pontiac	160	0	running	121	$63,595
15	8	25	Jerry Nadeau	Hendrick Motorsports	Chevrolet	160	0	running	118	$54,355
16	19	97	Chad Little	Roush Racing	Ford	160	0	running	115	$53,065
17	23	77	Robert Pressley	Jasper Motorsports	Ford	160	0	running	112	$43,525
18	10	21	Elliott Sadler	Wood Brothers Racing	Ford	160	0	running	109	$51,985
19	26	55	Kenny Wallace	Andy Petree Racing	Chevrolet	160	0	running	106	$52,145
20	22	17	Matt Kenseth (R)	Roush Racing	Ford	160	0	running	103	$55,480
21	35	75	Wally Dallenbach Jr.	Galaxy Motorsports	Ford	160	0	running	100	$41,660
22	28	42	Kenny Irwin Jr.	Team SABCO	Chevrolet	160	1	running	102	$49,340
23	14	36	Ken Schrader	MB2 Motorsports	Pontiac	160	0	running	94	$40,970
24	4	93	Dave Blaney (R)	Bill Davis Racing	Pontiac	160	0	running	91	$37,350
25	39	40	Sterling Marlin	Team SABCO	Chevrolet	160	0	running	88	$48,805
26	11	90	Ed Berrier (R)	Donlavey Racing	Ford	160	0	running	85	$36,845
27	33	66	Darrell Waltrip	Haas-Carter Motorsports	Ford	160	1	running	87	$39,790
28	24	27	Mike Bliss (R)	Eel River Racing	Pontiac	160	0	running	79	$36,370
29	32	50	Ricky Craven	Midwest Transit Racing	Chevrolet	160	0	running	76	$36,150
30	16	44	Kyle Petty	Petty Enterprises	Pontiac	160	0	running	73	$47,055
31	25	14	Rick Mast	A. J. Foyt Enterprises	Pontiac	160	0	running	70	$35,800
32	17	26	Jimmy Spencer	Haas-Carter Motorsports	Ford	160	0	running	67	$47,170
33	27	1	Steve Park	Dale Earnhardt, Inc.	Chevrolet	159	0	running	64	$46,540
34	43	60	Geoff Bodine	Joe Bessey Racing	Chevrolet	159	0	running	61	$45,960
35	31	8	Dale Earnhardt Jr. (R)	Dale Earnhardt, Inc.	Chevrolet	159	0	running	58	$45,330
36	42	4	Bobby Hamilton	Morgan–McClure Motorsports	Chevrolet	158	0	running	55	$43,200
37	30	16	Kevin Lepage	Roush Racing	Ford	135	0	running	52	$43,071
38	3	94	Bill Elliott	Bill Elliott Racing	Ford	113	42	crash	54	$43,875
39	13	9	Stacy Compton (R)	Melling Racing	Ford	113	0	crash	46	$34,800
40	36	32	Scott Pruett (R)	PPI Motorsports	Ford	104	0	crash	43	$34,650
41	37	5	Terry Labonte	Hendrick Motorsports	Chevrolet	81	0	crash	40	$52,525
42	41	7	Michael Waltrip	Mattei Motorsports	Chevrolet	81	0	crash	37	$42,400
43	38	12	Jeremy Mayfield	Penske-Kranefuss Racing	Ford	81	0	crash	34	$42,275
Official race results

== Media ==
=== Television ===
The Pepsi 400 was covered by CBS in the United States for the second straight year and it was their final NASCAR Cup Series race. Mike Joy, two-time NASCAR Cup Series champion Ned Jarrett and 1983 race winner Buddy Baker called the race from the broadcast booth. Dick Berggren, Ralph Sheheen and Bill Stephens handled pit road for the television side. Ken Squier would serve as host.

CBS
Host	Booth announcers		Pit reporters
Host	Lap-by-lap	Color-commentators	Pit reporters
Ken Squier	Mike Joy	Ned Jarrett; Buddy Baker	Dick Berggren; Ralph Sheheen; Bill Stephens

Previous race: 2000 Save Mart/Kragen 350	NASCAR Winston Cup Series; 2000 season	Next race: 2000 thatlook.com 300
