= 2000 CarsDirect.com 400 =

Third race of the 2000 NASCAR Winston Cup Series

Race details
- Race 3 of 34 in the 2000 NASCAR Winston Cup Series
- The 2000 CarsDirect.com 400 program cover.
- Date: March 5, 2000
- Official name: Third Annual CarsDirect.com 400
- Location: North Las Vegas, Nevada, Las Vegas Motor Speedway
- Course: Permanent racing facility
- Course length: 1.5 miles (2.41 km)
- Distance: 148 laps, 222 mi (357.272 km)
- Scheduled distance: 267 laps, 400.5 mi (644.542 km)
- Average speed: 119.982 miles per hour (193.092 km/h)

Pole position
Driver	Ricky Rudd	Robert Yates Racing
- Time: 31.293

Most laps led
Driver	Jeff Burton	Roush Racing
- Laps: 56

Winner
No. 99	Jeff Burton	Roush Racing

Television in the United States
- Network: ABC
- Announcers: Bob Jenkins, Benny Parsons, Ray Evernham

Radio in the United States
- Radio: Motor Racing Network

The 2000 CarsDirect.com 400 was the third stock car race of the 2000 NASCAR Winston Cup Series and the third iteration of the event. The race was held on Sunday, March 5, 2000, in North Las Vegas, Nevada at Las Vegas Motor Speedway, a 1.5 miles (2.4 km) permanent D-shaped oval racetrack. The race was decreased from 267 to 148 laps due to inclement weather. At race's end, Jeff Burton, driving for Roush Racing, took the lead away from teammate Mark Martin, and lead the final 13 laps before the race would get canceled from rain. This was Burton's 12th career NASCAR Winston Cup Series win and his first of the season. To fill out the podium, Tony Stewart of Joe Gibbs Racing and Mark Martin of Roush Racing would finish second and third, respectively.

== Background ==
The layout of Las Vegas Motor Speedway, the circuit where the race was held.

Las Vegas Motor Speedway, located in Clark County, Nevada in Las Vegas, Nevada about 15 miles northeast of the Las Vegas Strip, is a 1,200-acre (490 ha) complex of multiple tracks for motorsports racing. The complex is owned by Speedway Motorsports, Inc., which is headquartered in Charlotte, North Carolina.

=== Entry list ===
- (R) - denotes rookie driver

#	Driver	Team	Make
1	Steve Park	Dale Earnhardt, Inc.	Chevrolet
2	Rusty Wallace	Penske-Kranefuss Racing	Ford
3	Dale Earnhardt	Richard Childress Racing	Chevrolet
4	Bobby Hamilton	Morgan–McClure Motorsports	Chevrolet
5	Terry Labonte	Hendrick Motorsports	Chevrolet
6	Mark Martin	Roush Racing	Ford
7	Michael Waltrip	Mattei Motorsports	Chevrolet
8	Dale Earnhardt Jr. (R)	Dale Earnhardt, Inc.	Chevrolet
9	Stacy Compton (R)	Melling Racing	Ford
10	Johnny Benson Jr.	Tyler Jet Motorsports	Pontiac
11	Brett Bodine	Brett Bodine Racing	Ford
12	Jeremy Mayfield	Penske-Kranefuss Racing	Ford
13	Robby Gordon	Team Menard	Ford
14	Mike Bliss (R)	A. J. Foyt Racing	Pontiac
15	Derrike Cope	Fenley-Moore Motorsports	Ford
16	Kevin Lepage	Roush Racing	Ford
17	Matt Kenseth (R)	Roush Racing	Ford
18	Bobby Labonte	Joe Gibbs Racing	Pontiac
20	Tony Stewart	Joe Gibbs Racing	Pontiac
21	Elliott Sadler	Wood Brothers Racing	Ford
22	Ward Burton	Bill Davis Racing	Pontiac
24	Jeff Gordon	Hendrick Motorsports	Chevrolet
25	Jerry Nadeau	Hendrick Motorsports	Chevrolet
26	Jimmy Spencer	Haas-Carter Motorsports	Ford
27	Jeff Fuller (R)	Eel River Racing	Pontiac
28	Ricky Rudd	Robert Yates Racing	Ford
31	Mike Skinner	Richard Childress Racing	Chevrolet
32	Scott Pruett (R)	PPI Motorsports	Ford
33	Joe Nemechek	Andy Petree Racing	Chevrolet
36	Ken Schrader	MB2 Motorsports	Pontiac
40	Sterling Marlin	Team SABCO	Chevrolet
41	Rick Mast	Larry Hedrick Motorsports	Chevrolet
42	Kenny Irwin Jr.	Team SABCO	Chevrolet
43	John Andretti	Petty Enterprises	Pontiac
44	Kyle Petty	Petty Enterprises	Pontiac
50	Ricky Craven	Midwest Transit Racing	Chevrolet
55	Kenny Wallace	Andy Petree Racing	Chevrolet
60	Ted Musgrave	Joe Bessey Racing	Chevrolet
66	Darrell Waltrip	Haas-Carter Motorsports	Ford
71	Dave Marcis	Marcis Auto Racing	Chevrolet
75	Wally Dallenbach Jr.	Galaxy Motorsports	Ford
77	Robert Pressley	Jasper Motorsports	Ford
88	Dale Jarrett	Robert Yates Racing	Ford
89	Austin Cameron	AC Motorsports	Chevrolet
90	Ed Berrier	Donlavey Racing	Ford
93	Dave Blaney (R)	Bill Davis Racing	Pontiac
94	Bill Elliott	Bill Elliott Racing	Ford
97	Chad Little	Roush Racing	Ford
99	Jeff Burton	Roush Racing	Ford
Official entry list

== Practice ==
=== First practice ===
The first practice session was held on Friday, March 3, at 10:00 AM PST, and would last for three hours and 55 minutes. Dale Earnhardt Jr. of Dale Earnhardt, Inc. would set the fastest time in the session, with a lap of 31.548 and an average speed of 171.167 miles per hour (275.467 km/h).

Pos.	#	Driver	Team	Make	Time	Speed
1	8	Dale Earnhardt Jr. (R)	Dale Earnhardt, Inc.	Chevrolet	31.548	171.167
2	12	Jeremy Mayfield	Penske-Kranefuss Racing	Ford	31.710	170.293
3	1	Steve Park	Dale Earnhardt, Inc.	Chevrolet	31.737	170.148
Full first practice results

=== Second practice ===
The second practice session was held on Saturday, March 4, at 9:00 AM PST, and would last for one hour and 30 minutes. Ed Berrier of Donlavey Racing would set the fastest time in the session, with a lap of 32.515 and an average speed of 166.077 miles per hour (267.275 km/h).

Pos.	#	Driver	Team	Make	Time	Speed
1	90	Ed Berrier	Donlavey Racing	Ford	32.515	166.077
2	93	Dave Blaney (R)	Bill Davis Racing	Pontiac	32.549	165.903
3	6	Mark Martin	Roush Racing	Ford	32.571	165.791
Full second practice results

=== Final practice ===
The final practice session, sometimes referred to as Happy Hour, was held on Saturday, March 4, at 4:15 PM PST. Mark Martin of Roush Racing would set the fastest time in the session, with a lap of 32.535 and an average speed of 165.975 miles per hour (267.111 km/h).

Pos.	#	Driver	Team	Make	Time	Speed
1	6	Mark Martin	Roush Racing	Ford	32.535	165.975
2	12	Jeremy Mayfield	Penske-Kranefuss Racing	Ford	32.562	165.837
3	99	Jeff Burton	Roush Racing	Ford	32.618	165.552
Full Happy Hour practice results

== Qualifying ==
Qualifying was held on Friday, March 3, at 2:00 PM PST. Each driver would have one lap to set a fastest time; and that lap would count as their official qualifying lap. Positions 1-36 would be decided on time, while positions 37-43 would be based on provisionals. Six spots are awarded by the use of provisionals based on owner's points. The seventh is awarded to a past champion who has not otherwise qualified for the race. If no past champ needs the provisional, the next team in the owner points will be awarded a provisional.

Ricky Rudd of Robert Yates Racing would win the pole, setting a time of 31.293 and an average speed of 172.563 miles per hour (277.713 km/h).

Six drivers would fail to qualify: Rick Mast, Mike Bliss, Ed Berrier, Brett Bodine, Dave Marcis, and Austin Cameron.

=== Full qualifying results ===
Pos.	#	Driver	Team	Make	Time	Speed
1	28	Ricky Rudd	Robert Yates Racing	Ford	31.293	172.563
2	32	Scott Pruett (R)	PPI Motorsports	Ford	31.326	172.381
3	8	Dale Earnhardt Jr. (R)	Dale Earnhardt, Inc.	Chevrolet	31.356	172.216
4	18	Bobby Labonte	Joe Gibbs Racing	Pontiac	31.429	171.816
5	6	Mark Martin	Roush Racing	Ford	31.460	171.647
6	88	Dale Jarrett	Robert Yates Racing	Ford	31.553	171.141
7	7	Michael Waltrip	Mattei Motorsports	Chevrolet	31.579	171.000
8	10	Johnny Benson Jr.	Tyler Jet Motorsports	Pontiac	31.588	170.951
9	25	Jerry Nadeau	Hendrick Motorsports	Chevrolet	31.646	170.638
10	24	Jeff Gordon	Hendrick Motorsports	Chevrolet	31.659	170.568
11	99	Jeff Burton	Roush Racing	Ford	31.663	170.546
12	13	Robby Gordon	Team Menard	Ford	31.713	170.277
13	77	Robert Pressley	Jasper Motorsports	Ford	31.716	170.261
14	16	Kevin Lepage	Roush Racing	Ford	31.720	170.240
15	12	Jeremy Mayfield	Penske-Kranefuss Racing	Ford	31.727	170.202
16	20	Tony Stewart	Joe Gibbs Racing	Pontiac	31.731	170.181
17	21	Elliott Sadler	Wood Brothers Racing	Ford	31.746	170.100
18	33	Joe Nemechek	Andy Petree Racing	Chevrolet	31.752	170.068
19	2	Rusty Wallace	Penske-Kranefuss Racing	Ford	31.766	169.993
20	31	Mike Skinner	Richard Childress Racing	Chevrolet	31.779	169.924
21	17	Matt Kenseth (R)	Roush Racing	Ford	31.781	169.913
22	27	Jeff Fuller (R)	Eel River Racing	Pontiac	31.791	169.859
23	1	Steve Park	Dale Earnhardt, Inc.	Chevrolet	31.800	169.811
24	5	Terry Labonte	Hendrick Motorsports	Chevrolet	31.865	169.465
25	42	Kenny Irwin Jr.	Team SABCO	Chevrolet	31.920	169.173
26	15	Derrike Cope	Fenley-Moore Motorsports	Ford	31.965	168.935
27	97	Chad Little	Roush Racing	Ford	31.981	168.850
28	60	Ted Musgrave	Joe Bessey Racing	Chevrolet	31.981	168.850
29	50	Ricky Craven	Midwest Transit Racing	Chevrolet	31.986	168.824
30	40	Sterling Marlin	Team SABCO	Chevrolet	31.987	168.819
31	4	Bobby Hamilton	Morgan–McClure Motorsports	Chevrolet	31.988	168.813
32	9	Stacy Compton (R)	Melling Racing	Ford	32.080	168.329
33	3	Dale Earnhardt	Richard Childress Racing	Chevrolet	32.081	168.324
34	36	Ken Schrader	MB2 Motorsports	Pontiac	32.092	168.266
35	26	Jimmy Spencer	Haas-Carter Motorsports	Ford	32.100	168.224
36	93	Dave Blaney (R)	Bill Davis Racing	Pontiac	32.121	168.114
Provisionals
37	22	Ward Burton	Bill Davis Racing	Pontiac	—	—
38	43	John Andretti	Petty Enterprises	Pontiac	—	—
39	94	Bill Elliott	Bill Elliott Racing	Ford	—	—
40	55	Kenny Wallace	Andy Petree Racing	Chevrolet	—	—
41	44	Kyle Petty	Petty Enterprises	Pontiac	—	—
42	75	Wally Dallenbach Jr.	Galaxy Motorsports	Ford	—	—
43	66	Darrell Waltrip	Haas-Carter Motorsports	Ford	—	—
Failed to qualify
44	41	Rick Mast	Larry Hedrick Motorsports	Chevrolet	32.406	166.636
45	14	Mike Bliss (R)	A. J. Foyt Racing	Pontiac	32.525	166.026
46	90	Ed Berrier	Donlavey Racing	Ford	32.728	164.996
47	11	Brett Bodine	Brett Bodine Racing	Ford	32.972	163.775
48	71	Dave Marcis	Marcis Auto Racing	Chevrolet	33.291	162.206
49	89	Austin Cameron	AC Motorsports	Chevrolet	33.571	160.853
Official qualifying results

== Race results ==
Fin	St	#	Driver	Team	Make	Laps	Led	Status	Pts
1	11	99	Jeff Burton	Roush Racing	Ford	148	56	Running	185
2	16	20	Tony Stewart	Joe Gibbs Racing	Pontiac	148	0	Running	170
3	5	6	Mark Martin	Roush Racing	Ford	148	33	Running	170
4	39	94	Bill Elliott	Bill Elliott Racing	Ford	148	0	Running	160
5	4	18	Bobby Labonte	Joe Gibbs Racing	Pontiac	148	0	Running	155
6	8	10	Johnny Benson Jr.	Tyler Jet Motorsports	Pontiac	148	0	Running	150
7	6	88	Dale Jarrett	Robert Yates Racing	Ford	148	0	Running	146
8	33	3	Dale Earnhardt	Richard Childress Racing	Chevrolet	148	0	Running	142
9	18	33	Joe Nemechek	Andy Petree Racing	Chevrolet	148	0	Running	138
10	3	8	Dale Earnhardt Jr. (R)	Dale Earnhardt, Inc.	Chevrolet	148	42	Running	139
11	14	16	Kevin Lepage	Roush Racing	Ford	148	0	Running	130
12	1	28	Ricky Rudd	Robert Yates Racing	Ford	148	1	Running	132
13	12	13	Robby Gordon	Team Menard	Ford	148	8	Running	129
14	21	17	Matt Kenseth (R)	Roush Racing	Ford	148	0	Running	121
15	19	2	Rusty Wallace	Penske-Kranefuss Racing	Ford	148	0	Running	118
16	34	36	Ken Schrader	MB2 Motorsports	Pontiac	148	0	Running	115
17	15	12	Jeremy Mayfield	Penske-Kranefuss Racing	Ford	148	0	Running	112
18	30	40	Sterling Marlin	Team SABCO	Chevrolet	148	0	Running	109
19	27	97	Chad Little	Roush Racing	Ford	148	0	Running	106
20	9	25	Jerry Nadeau	Hendrick Motorsports	Chevrolet	147	0	Running	103
21	13	77	Robert Pressley	Jasper Motorsports	Ford	147	0	Running	100
22	36	93	Dave Blaney (R)	Bill Davis Racing	Pontiac	147	0	Running	97
23	37	22	Ward Burton	Bill Davis Racing	Pontiac	147	0	Running	94
24	25	42	Kenny Irwin Jr.	Team SABCO	Chevrolet	147	0	Running	91
25	38	43	John Andretti	Petty Enterprises	Pontiac	147	0	Running	88
26	28	60	Ted Musgrave	Joe Bessey Racing	Chevrolet	147	0	Running	85
27	20	31	Mike Skinner	Richard Childress Racing	Chevrolet	147	0	Running	82
28	10	24	Jeff Gordon	Hendrick Motorsports	Chevrolet	147	0	Running	79
29	41	44	Kyle Petty	Petty Enterprises	Pontiac	147	6	Running	81
30	35	26	Jimmy Spencer	Haas-Carter Motorsports	Ford	147	0	Running	73
31	24	5	Terry Labonte	Hendrick Motorsports	Chevrolet	147	0	Running	70
32	32	9	Stacy Compton (R)	Melling Racing	Ford	147	0	Running	67
33	7	7	Michael Waltrip	Mattei Motorsports	Chevrolet	147	0	Running	64
34	31	4	Bobby Hamilton	Morgan–McClure Motorsports	Chevrolet	146	0	Running	61
35	42	75	Wally Dallenbach Jr.	Galaxy Motorsports	Ford	146	0	Running	58
36	22	27	Jeff Fuller (R)	Eel River Racing	Pontiac	146	0	Running	55
37	26	15	Derrike Cope	Fenley-Moore Motorsports	Ford	146	0	Running	52
38	43	66	Darrell Waltrip	Haas-Carter Motorsports	Ford	146	2	Running	54
39	40	55	Kenny Wallace	Andy Petree Racing	Chevrolet	146	0	Running	46
40	29	50	Ricky Craven	Midwest Transit Racing	Chevrolet	145	0	Running	43
41	17	21	Elliott Sadler	Wood Brothers Racing	Ford	145	0	Running	40
42	2	32	Scott Pruett (R)	PPI Motorsports	Ford	143	0	Running	37
43	23	1	Steve Park	Dale Earnhardt, Inc.	Chevrolet	92	0	Engine	34
Official race results

== Media ==
=== Television ===
The race was aired live on ABC in the United States for the third and final time. Bob Jenkins, 1973 Cup Series champion Benny Parsons and former crew chief Ray Evernham called the race from the broadcast booth. Jerry Punch, Bill Weber and John Kernan handled pit road for the television side.

ABC
Booth announcers		Pit reporters
Lap-by-lap	Color-commentators	Pit reporters
Bob Jenkins	Benny Parsons; Ray Evernham	Jerry Punch; Bill Weber; John Kernan

Previous race: 2000 Dura Lube/Kmart 400	NASCAR Winston Cup Series; 2000 season	Next race: 2000 Cracker Barrel Old Country Store 500
