= 2000 Food City 500 =

Sixth race of the 2000 NASCAR Winston Cup Series

Race details
- Race 6 of 34 in the 2000 NASCAR Winston Cup Series
- The 2000 Food City 500 program cover. Artwork by NASCAR artist Sam Bass.
- Date: March 26, 2000
- Official name: 40th Annual Food City 500
- Location: Bristol, Tennessee, Bristol Motor Speedway
- Course: Permanent racing facility
- Course length: 0.533 miles (0.858 km)
- Distance: 500 laps, 266.5 mi (428.89 km)
- Average speed: 88.018 miles per hour (141.651 km/h)
- Attendance: 147,000

Pole position
Driver	Steve Park	Dale Earnhardt, Inc.
- Time: 15.184

Most laps led
Driver	Jeff Gordon	Hendrick Motorsports
- Laps: 225

Winner
No. 2	Rusty Wallace	Penske-Kranefuss Racing

Television in the United States
- Network: ESPN
- Announcers: Bob Jenkins, Ned Jarrett, Benny Parsons

Radio in the United States
- Radio: Performance Racing Network

The 2000 Food City 500 was the sixth stock car race of the 2000 NASCAR Winston Cup Series and the 40th iteration of the event. The race was held on Sunday, March 26, 2000, before an audience of 147,000 in Bristol, Tennessee, at Bristol Motor Raceway, a 0.533 miles (0.858 km) permanent oval-shaped racetrack. At race's end, Penske-Kranefuss Racing's Rusty Wallace managed to avoid wrecks and kept his car clean in the late stages of the race to take his 50th career NASCAR Winston Cup Series and his first victory of the season. To fill out the Top 3, Tyler Jet Motorsports's Johnny Benson Jr. and Bill Davis Racing's Ward Burton finished 2nd and 3rd, respectively.

== Background ==
The layout of Bristol Motor Speedway, the venue where the race was held.

The Bristol Motor Speedway, formerly known as Bristol International Raceway and Bristol Raceway, is a NASCAR short track venue located in Bristol, Tennessee. Constructed in 1960, it held its first NASCAR race on July 30, 1961. Despite its short length, Bristol is among the most popular tracks on the NASCAR schedule because of its distinct features, which include extraordinarily steep banking, an all concrete surface, two pit roads, and stadium-like seating. It has also been named one of the loudest NASCAR tracks.

=== Entry list ===
- (R) denotes rookie driver.

#	Driver	Team	Make
1	Steve Park	Dale Earnhardt, Inc.	Chevrolet
2	Rusty Wallace	Penske-Kranefuss Racing	Ford
3	Dale Earnhardt	Richard Childress Racing	Chevrolet
4	Bobby Hamilton	Morgan–McClure Motorsports	Chevrolet
5	Terry Labonte	Hendrick Motorsports	Chevrolet
6	Mark Martin	Roush Racing	Ford
7	Michael Waltrip	Mattei Motorsports	Chevrolet
8	Dale Earnhardt Jr. (R)	Dale Earnhardt, Inc.	Chevrolet
9	Stacy Compton (R)	Melling Racing	Ford
10	Johnny Benson Jr.	Tyler Jet Motorsports	Pontiac
11	Brett Bodine	Brett Bodine Racing	Ford
12	Jeremy Mayfield	Penske-Kranefuss Racing	Ford
13	Robby Gordon	Team Menard	Ford
14	Dick Trickle	A. J. Foyt Enterprises	Pontiac
16	Kevin Lepage	Roush Racing	Ford
17	Matt Kenseth (R)	Roush Racing	Ford
18	Bobby Labonte	Joe Gibbs Racing	Pontiac
20	Tony Stewart	Joe Gibbs Racing	Pontiac
21	Elliott Sadler	Wood Brothers Racing	Ford
22	Ward Burton	Bill Davis Racing	Pontiac
24	Jeff Gordon	Hendrick Motorsports	Chevrolet
25	Jerry Nadeau	Hendrick Motorsports	Chevrolet
26	Jimmy Spencer	Haas-Carter Motorsports	Ford
27	Jeff Fuller	Eel River Racing	Pontiac
28	Ricky Rudd	Robert Yates Racing	Ford
31	Mike Skinner	Richard Childress Racing	Chevrolet
32	Scott Pruett (R)	PPI Motorsports	Ford
33	Joe Nemechek	Andy Petree Racing	Chevrolet
36	Ken Schrader	MB2 Motorsports	Pontiac
40	Sterling Marlin	Team SABCO	Chevrolet
41	Rick Mast	Larry Hedrick Motorsports	Chevrolet
42	Kenny Irwin Jr.	Team SABCO	Chevrolet
43	John Andretti	Petty Enterprises	Pontiac
44	Kyle Petty	Petty Enterprises	Pontiac
50	Ricky Craven	Midwest Transit Racing	Chevrolet
55	Kenny Wallace	Andy Petree Racing	Chevrolet
60	Ted Musgrave	Joe Bessey Racing	Chevrolet
66	Darrell Waltrip	Haas-Carter Motorsports	Ford
71	Dave Marcis	Marcis Auto Racing	Chevrolet
75	Wally Dallenbach Jr.	Galaxy Motorsports	Ford
77	Robert Pressley	Jasper Motorsports	Ford
88	Dale Jarrett	Robert Yates Racing	Ford
90	Ed Berrier (R)	Donlavey Racing	Ford
93	Dave Blaney (R)	Bill Davis Racing	Pontiac
94	Bill Elliott	Bill Elliott Racing	Ford
97	Chad Little	Roush Racing	Ford
99	Jeff Burton	Roush Racing	Ford

== Practice ==
=== First practice ===
The first practice session was held on Friday, March 24, at 11:00 AM EST. The session would last for one hour and 15 minutes. Dale Earnhardt, Inc.'s Steve Park set the fastest time in the session, with a lap of 15.310 and an average speed of 125.330 mph (201.699 km/h).

Pos.	#	Driver	Team	Make	Time	Speed
1	1	Steve Park	Dale Earnhardt, Inc.	Chevrolet	15.310	125.330
2	22	Ward Burton	Bill Davis Racing	Pontiac	15.319	125.256
3	99	Jeff Burton	Roush Racing	Ford	15.328	125.183
Full first practice results

=== Second practice ===
The second practice session was held on Friday, March 24, at 1:15 PM EST. The session would last for 30 minutes. Dale Earnhardt, Inc.'s Steve Park set the fastest time in the session, with a lap of 15.243 and an average speed of 125.881 mph (202.586 km/h).

Pos.	#	Driver	Team	Make	Time	Speed
1	1	Steve Park	Dale Earnhardt, Inc.	Chevrolet	15.243	125.881
2	4	Bobby Hamilton	Morgan–McClure Motorsports	Chevrolet	15.282	125.559
3	24	Jeff Gordon	Hendrick Motorsports	Chevrolet	15.284	125.543
Full second practice results

=== Final practice ===
The final practice session, sometimes referred to as Happy Hour, was held on Saturday, March 25, after the 2000 Cheez-It 250. The session would last for one hour. Wood Brothers Racing's Elliott Sadler set the fastest time in the session, with a lap of 15.786 and an average speed of 121.551 mph (195.617 km/h).

Pos.	#	Driver	Team	Make	Time	Speed
1	21	Elliott Sadler	Wood Brothers Racing	Ford	15.786	121.551
2	3	Dale Earnhardt	Richard Childress Racing	Chevrolet	15.850	121.060
3	24	Jeff Gordon	Hendrick Motorsports	Chevrolet	15.853	121.037
Full Happy Hour practice results

== Qualifying ==
Qualifying was split into two rounds. The first round was held on Friday, March 24, at 3:00 PM EST. Each driver would have two laps to set a fastest time; the fastest of the two would count as their official qualifying lap. During the first round, the top 25 drivers in the round would be guaranteed a starting spot in the race. If a driver was not able to guarantee a spot in the first round, they had the option to scrub their time from the first round and try and run a faster lap time in a second round qualifying run, held on Saturday, March 25, at 11:30 AM EST. As with the first round, each driver would have two laps to set a fastest time; the fastest of the two would count as their official qualifying lap. Positions 26–36 would be decided on time, while positions 37–43 would be based on provisionals. Six spots were awarded by the use of provisionals based on owner's points. The seventh was awarded to a past champion who has not otherwise qualified for the race. If no past champion needs the provisional, the next team in the owner points was awarded a provisional.

Steve Park, driving for Dale Earnhardt, Inc., managed to win the pole, setting a time of 15.184 and an average speed of 126.370 miles per hour (203.373 km/h) in the first round.

Four drivers failed to qualify.

=== Full qualifying results ===
Pos.	#	Driver	Team	Make	Time	Speed
1	1	Steve Park	Dale Earnhardt, Inc.	Chevrolet	15.184	126.370
2	55	Kenny Wallace	Andy Petree Racing	Chevrolet	15.242	125.889
3	24	Jeff Gordon	Hendrick Motorsports	Chevrolet	15.256	125.773
4	31	Mike Skinner	Richard Childress Racing	Chevrolet	15.318	125.264
5	22	Ward Burton	Bill Davis Racing	Pontiac	15.319	125.256
6	2	Rusty Wallace	Penske-Kranefuss Racing	Ford	15.328	125.183
7	5	Terry Labonte	Hendrick Motorsports	Chevrolet	15.336	125.117
8	4	Bobby Hamilton	Morgan–McClure Motorsports	Chevrolet	15.338	125.107
9	21	Elliott Sadler	Wood Brothers Racing	Ford	15.348	125.020
10	18	Bobby Labonte	Joe Gibbs Racing	Pontiac	15.349	125.011
11	3	Dale Earnhardt	Richard Childress Racing	Chevrolet	15.379	124.768
12	8	Dale Earnhardt Jr. (R)	Dale Earnhardt, Inc.	Chevrolet	15.384	124.727
13	66	Darrell Waltrip	Haas-Carter Motorsports	Ford	15.386	124.711
14	33	Joe Nemechek	Andy Petree Racing	Chevrolet	15.388	124.695
15	99	Jeff Burton	Roush Racing	Ford	15.389	124.686
16	25	Jerry Nadeau	Hendrick Motorsports	Chevrolet	15.398	124.614
17	12	Jeremy Mayfield	Penske-Kranefuss Racing	Ford	15.402	124.581
18	77	Robert Pressley	Jasper Motorsports	Ford	15.402	124.581
19	20	Tony Stewart	Joe Gibbs Racing	Pontiac	15.407	124.541
20	88	Dale Jarrett	Robert Yates Racing	Ford	15.412	124.500
21	14	Dick Trickle	A. J. Foyt Racing	Pontiac	15.412	124.500
22	17	Matt Kenseth (R)	Roush Racing	Ford	15.421	124.428
23	7	Michael Waltrip	Mattei Motorsports	Chevrolet	15.425	124.395
24	11	Brett Bodine	Brett Bodine Racing	Ford	15.430	124.355
25	36	Ken Schrader	MB2 Motorsports	Pontiac	15.445	124.234
Failed to lock in the first round
26	93	Dave Blaney (R)	Bill Davis Racing	Pontiac	15.400	124.597
27	28	Ricky Rudd	Robert Yates Racing	Ford	15.448	124.210
28	40	Sterling Marlin	Team SABCO	Chevrolet	15.454	124.162
29	9	Stacy Compton (R)	Melling Racing	Ford	15.463	124.090
30	26	Jimmy Spencer	Haas-Carter Motorsports	Ford	15.470	124.034
31	97	Chad Little	Roush Racing	Ford	15.480	123.953
32	43	John Andretti	Petty Enterprises	Pontiac	15.481	123.945
33	10	Johnny Benson Jr.	Tyler Jet Motorsports	Pontiac	15.483	123.929
34	6	Mark Martin	Roush Racing	Ford	15.490	123.873
35	44	Kyle Petty	Petty Enterprises	Pontiac	15.493	123.849
36	60	Ted Musgrave	Joe Bessey Racing	Chevrolet	15.506	123.746
Provisionals
37	94	Bill Elliott	Bill Elliott Racing	Ford	-*	-*
38	16	Kevin Lepage	Roush Racing	Ford	-*	-*
39	42	Kenny Irwin Jr.	Team SABCO	Chevrolet	-*	-*
40	13	Robby Gordon	Team Menard	Ford	-*	-*
41	41	Rick Mast	Larry Hedrick Motorsports	Chevrolet	-*	-*
42	75	Wally Dallenbach Jr.	Galaxy Motorsports	Ford	-*	-*
43	27	Jeff Fuller	Eel River Racing	Pontiac	-*	-*
Failed to qualify
44	71	Dave Marcis	Marcis Auto Racing	Chevrolet	15.613	122.898
45	50	Ricky Craven	Midwest Transit Racing	Chevrolet	15.665	122.490
46	90	Ed Berrier (R)	Donlavey Racing	Ford	15.726	122.014
47	32	Scott Pruett (R)	PPI Motorsports	Ford	-	-
Official first round qualifying results
Official starting lineup

== Race results ==
Fin	St	#	Driver	Team	Make	Laps	Led	Status	Pts	Winnings
1	6	2	Rusty Wallace	Penske-Kranefuss Racing	Ford	500	86	running	180	$87,585
2	33	10	Johnny Benson Jr.	Tyler Jet Motorsports	Pontiac	500	0	running	170	$87,535
3	5	22	Ward Burton	Bill Davis Racing	Pontiac	500	14	running	170	$81,135
4	17	12	Jeremy Mayfield	Penske-Kranefuss Racing	Ford	500	124	running	165	$49,795
5	7	5	Terry Labonte	Hendrick Motorsports	Chevrolet	500	0	running	155	$60,745
6	10	18	Bobby Labonte	Joe Gibbs Racing	Pontiac	500	0	running	150	$57,695
7	1	1	Steve Park	Dale Earnhardt, Inc.	Chevrolet	500	40	running	151	$49,995
8	3	24	Jeff Gordon	Hendrick Motorsports	Chevrolet	500	225	running	152	$51,295
9	15	99	Jeff Burton	Roush Racing	Ford	500	0	running	138	$49,990
10	28	40	Sterling Marlin	Team SABCO	Chevrolet	500	0	running	134	$52,540
11	23	7	Michael Waltrip	Mattei Motorsports	Chevrolet	500	1	running	135	$48,820
12	22	17	Matt Kenseth (R)	Roush Racing	Ford	500	0	running	127	$42,165
13	4	31	Mike Skinner	Richard Childress Racing	Chevrolet	500	0	running	124	$40,990
14	27	28	Ricky Rudd	Robert Yates Racing	Ford	500	0	running	121	$40,315
15	8	4	Bobby Hamilton	Morgan–McClure Motorsports	Chevrolet	500	0	running	118	$43,165
16	34	6	Mark Martin	Roush Racing	Ford	499	0	running	115	$46,290
17	18	77	Robert Pressley	Jasper Motorsports	Ford	499	0	running	112	$33,840
18	30	26	Jimmy Spencer	Haas-Carter Motorsports	Ford	499	0	running	109	$40,840
19	16	25	Jerry Nadeau	Hendrick Motorsports	Chevrolet	499	0	running	106	$39,530
20	2	55	Kenny Wallace	Andy Petree Racing	Chevrolet	499	0	running	103	$45,175
21	20	88	Dale Jarrett	Robert Yates Racing	Ford	499	7	running	105	$52,915
22	24	11	Brett Bodine	Brett Bodine Racing	Ford	498	0	running	97	$27,765
23	31	97	Chad Little	Roush Racing	Ford	497	0	running	94	$38,915
24	35	44	Kyle Petty	Petty Enterprises	Pontiac	497	0	running	91	$38,740
25	14	33	Joe Nemechek	Andy Petree Racing	Chevrolet	497	0	running	88	$38,595
26	25	36	Ken Schrader	MB2 Motorsports	Pontiac	497	0	running	85	$30,965
27	21	14	Dick Trickle	A. J. Foyt Racing	Pontiac	496	0	running	82	$27,545
28	29	9	Stacy Compton (R)	Melling Racing	Ford	496	0	running	79	$30,590
29	42	75	Wally Dallenbach Jr.	Galaxy Motorsports	Ford	493	0	running	76	$27,460
30	38	16	Kevin Lepage	Roush Racing	Ford	492	0	running	73	$35,635
31	13	66	Darrell Waltrip	Haas-Carter Motorsports	Ford	475	0	running	70	$26,365
32	40	13	Robby Gordon	Team Menard	Ford	473	0	running	67	$26,345
33	32	43	John Andretti	Petty Enterprises	Pontiac	460	0	accident	64	$44,325
34	41	41	Rick Mast	Larry Hedrick Motorsports	Chevrolet	459	0	accident	61	$26,285
35	26	93	Dave Blaney (R)	Bill Davis Racing	Pontiac	457	0	accident	58	$26,765
36	37	94	Bill Elliott	Bill Elliott Racing	Ford	457	0	accident	55	$34,245
37	43	27	Jeff Fuller	Eel River Racing	Pontiac	414	1	accident	57	$26,235
38	12	8	Dale Earnhardt Jr. (R)	Dale Earnhardt, Inc.	Chevrolet	401	0	accident	49	$26,225
39	11	3	Dale Earnhardt	Richard Childress Racing	Chevrolet	346	2	running	51	$45,215
40	39	42	Kenny Irwin Jr.	Team SABCO	Chevrolet	335	0	running	43	$34,175
41	9	21	Elliott Sadler	Wood Brothers Racing	Ford	325	0	running	40	$34,150
42	19	20	Tony Stewart	Joe Gibbs Racing	Pontiac	73	0	engine	37	$45,525
43	36	60	Ted Musgrave	Joe Bessey Racing	Chevrolet	22	0	engine	34	$34,111
Failed to qualify
44		71	Dave Marcis	Marcis Auto Racing	Chevrolet					
45		50	Ricky Craven	Midwest Transit Racing	Chevrolet					
46		90	Ed Berrier (R)	Donlavey Racing	Ford					
47		32	Scott Pruett (R)	PPI Motorsports	Ford					
Official race results

== Standings after the race ==
Drivers' Championship standings

	Pos	Driver	Points
	1	Bobby Labonte	944
2	2	Ward Burton	903 (−41)
1	3	Mark Martin	900 (−44)
1	4	Dale Jarrett	826 (−118)
1	5	Dale Earnhardt	813 (−131)
4	6	Rusty Wallace	775 (−169)
1	7	Ricky Rudd	768 (−176)
1	8	Jeff Burton	759 (−185)
3	9	Terry Labonte	731 (−213)
3	10	Jeff Gordon	721 (−223)
Official driver's standings

- Note: Only the first 10 positions are included for the driver standings.

== Media ==
=== Television ===
The race was aired live on ESPN in the United States. Bob Jenkins, two-time Cup Series champion Ned Jarrett and 1973 Cup Series champion Benny Parsons called the race from the broadcast booth. Jerry Punch, Bill Weber and John Kernan handled pit road for the television side.

ESPN
Booth announcers		Pit reporters
Lap-by-lap	Color-commentators	Pit reporters
Bob Jenkins	Ned Jarrett; Benny Parsons	Jerry Punch; Bill Weber; John Kernan

Previous race: 2000 Mall.com 400	NASCAR Winston Cup Series; 2000 season	Next race: 2000 DirecTV 500
