= 2000 Cracker Barrel Old Country Store 500 =

Fourth race of the 2000 NASCAR Winston Cup Series

Race details
- Race 4 of 34 in the 2000 NASCAR Winston Cup Series
- The 2000 Cracker Barrel Old Country Store 500 program cover.
- Date: March 12, 2000
- Official name: 41st Annual Cracker Barrel Old Country Store 500
- Location: Hampton, Georgia, Atlanta Motor Speedway
- Course: Permanent racing facility
- Course length: 1.54 miles (2.48 km)
- Distance: 325 laps, 500.5 mi (805.476 km)
- Scheduled distance: 325 laps, 500.5 mi (805.476 km)
- Average speed: 131.759 miles per hour (212.046 km/h)

Pole position
Driver	Dale Jarrett	Robert Yates Racing
- Time: 28.789

Most laps led
Driver	Mike Skinner	Richard Childress Racing
- Laps: 191

Winner
No. 3	Dale Earnhardt	Richard Childress Racing

Television in the United States
- Network: ABC
- Announcers: Bob Jenkins, Benny Parsons, Ray Evernham

Radio in the United States
- Radio: Motor Racing Network

The 2000 Cracker Barrel Old Country Store 500 was the fourth stock car race of the 2000 NASCAR Winston Cup Series and the 41st iteration of the event. The race was held on Sunday, March 12, 2000, in Hampton, Georgia at Atlanta Motor Speedway, a 1.54 miles (2.48 km) permanent D-shaped oval racetrack. The race was contested over 325 laps. At race's end, Dale Earnhardt, driving for Richard Childress Racing, held off Bobby Labonte in a photo finish for his 75th career NASCAR Winston Cup Series win. Earnhardt would beat Labonte by 0.010 of a second. To fill out the podium, Mark Martin of Roush Racing would finish third, respectively.

== Background ==
The layout of Atlanta Motor Speedway, the circuit where the race was held.

Atlanta Motor Speedway (formerly Atlanta International Raceway) is a 1.54-mile race track in Hampton, Georgia, United States, 20 miles (32 km) south of Atlanta. It has annually hosted NASCAR Winston Cup Series stock car races since its inauguration in 1960.

The venue was bought by Speedway Motorsports in 1990. In 1994, 46 condominiums were built over the northeastern side of the track. In 1997, to standardize the track with Speedway Motorsports' other two intermediate ovals, the entire track was almost completely rebuilt. The frontstretch and backstretch were swapped, and the configuration of the track was changed from oval to quad-oval, with a new official length of 1.54-mile (2.48 km) where before it was 1.522-mile (2.449 km). The project made the track one of the fastest on the NASCAR circuit.

=== Entry list ===
- (R) - denotes rookie driver

#	Driver	Team	Make
1	Steve Park	Dale Earnhardt, Inc.	Chevrolet
2	Rusty Wallace	Penske-Kranefuss Racing	Ford
3	Dale Earnhardt	Richard Childress Racing	Chevrolet
4	Bobby Hamilton	Morgan–McClure Motorsports	Chevrolet
5	Terry Labonte	Hendrick Motorsports	Chevrolet
6	Mark Martin	Roush Racing	Ford
7	Michael Waltrip	Mattei Motorsports	Chevrolet
8	Dale Earnhardt Jr. (R)	Dale Earnhardt, Inc.	Chevrolet
9	Stacy Compton (R)	Melling Racing	Ford
10	Johnny Benson Jr.	Tyler Jet Motorsports	Pontiac
11	Brett Bodine	Brett Bodine Racing	Ford
12	Jeremy Mayfield	Penske-Kranefuss Racing	Ford
13	Robby Gordon	Team Menard	Ford
14	Mike Bliss (R)	A. J. Foyt Racing	Pontiac
15	Derrike Cope	Fenley-Moore Motorsports	Ford
16	Kevin Lepage	Roush Racing	Ford
17	Matt Kenseth (R)	Roush Racing	Ford
18	Bobby Labonte	Joe Gibbs Racing	Pontiac
20	Tony Stewart	Joe Gibbs Racing	Pontiac
21	Elliott Sadler	Wood Brothers Racing	Ford
22	Ward Burton	Bill Davis Racing	Pontiac
24	Jeff Gordon	Hendrick Motorsports	Chevrolet
25	Jerry Nadeau	Hendrick Motorsports	Chevrolet
26	Jimmy Spencer	Haas-Carter Motorsports	Ford
27	Jeff Fuller (R)	Eel River Racing	Pontiac
28	Ricky Rudd	Robert Yates Racing	Ford
31	Mike Skinner	Richard Childress Racing	Chevrolet
32	Scott Pruett (R)	PPI Motorsports	Ford
33	Joe Nemechek	Andy Petree Racing	Chevrolet
36	Ken Schrader	MB2 Motorsports	Pontiac
40	Sterling Marlin	Team SABCO	Chevrolet
41	Rick Mast	Larry Hedrick Motorsports	Chevrolet
42	Kenny Irwin Jr.	Team SABCO	Chevrolet
43	John Andretti	Petty Enterprises	Pontiac
44	Kyle Petty	Petty Enterprises	Pontiac
50	Ricky Craven	Midwest Transit Racing	Chevrolet
55	Kenny Wallace	Andy Petree Racing	Chevrolet
60	Ted Musgrave	Joe Bessey Racing	Chevrolet
66	Darrell Waltrip	Haas-Carter Motorsports	Ford
71	Dave Marcis	Marcis Auto Racing	Chevrolet
75	Wally Dallenbach Jr.	Galaxy Motorsports	Ford
77	Robert Pressley	Jasper Motorsports	Ford
88	Dale Jarrett	Robert Yates Racing	Ford
90	Ed Berrier	Donlavey Racing	Ford
91	Todd Bodine	LJ Racing	Chevrolet
93	Dave Blaney (R)	Bill Davis Racing	Pontiac
94	Bill Elliott	Bill Elliott Racing	Ford
97	Chad Little	Roush Racing	Ford
99	Jeff Burton	Roush Racing	Ford
Official entry list

== Practice ==
=== First practice ===
The first practice session was held on Friday, March 10, at 11:00 AM EST, and would last for one hour and 30 minutes. Steve Park of Dale Earnhardt, Inc. would set the fastest time in the session, with a lap of 29.047 and an average speed of 190.863 mph (307.164 km/h).

Pos.	#	Driver	Team	Make	Time	Speed
1	1	Steve Park	Dale Earnhardt, Inc.	Chevrolet	29.047	190.863
2	31	Mike Skinner	Richard Childress Racing	Chevrolet	29.125	190.351
3	43	John Andretti	Petty Enterprises	Pontiac	29.159	190.129
Full first practice results

=== Second practice ===
The second practice session was held on Friday, March 10, at 1:40 PM EST, and would last for 23 minutes, due to inclement weather. Steve Park of Dale Earnhardt, Inc. would set the fastest time in the session, with an average speed of 190.995 mph (307.377 km/h).

Pos.	#	Driver	Team	Make	Speed
1	1	Steve Park	Dale Earnhardt, Inc.	Chevrolet	190.995
2	77	Robert Pressley	Jasper Motorsports	Ford	190.981
3	25	Jerry Nadeau	Hendrick Motorsports	Chevrolet	190.058
Full second practice results

=== Final practice ===
The final practice session, sometimes referred to as Happy Hour, was held on Saturday, March 11. Robby Gordon of Team Menard would set the fastest time in the session, with a lap of 29.455 and an average speed of 188.219 mph (302.909 km/h).

Pos.	#	Driver	Team	Make	Time	Speed
1	13	Robby Gordon	Team Menard	Ford	29.455	188.219
2	36	Ken Schrader	MB2 Motorsports	Pontiac	29.633	187.088
3	90	Ed Berrier	Donlavey Racing	Ford	29.695	186.698
Full Happy Hour practice results

== Qualifying ==
Qualifying was held on Friday, March 3, at 2:00 PM PST. Each driver would have one lap to set a fastest time; and that lap would count as their official qualifying lap. Positions 1-36 would be decided on time, while positions 37-43 would be based on provisionals. Six spots are awarded by the use of provisionals based on owner's points. The seventh is awarded to a past champion who has not otherwise qualified for the race. If no past champ needs the provisional, the next team in the owner points will be awarded a provisional.

Dale Jarrett of Robert Yates Racing would win the pole, setting a time of 28.789 and an average speed of 192.574 mph (309.918 km/h).

Five drivers would fail to qualify: Dave Marcis, Ed Berrier, Johnny Benson Jr., Mike Bliss, and Robby Gordon.

=== Full qualifying results ===
Pos.	#	Driver	Team	Make	Time	Speed
1	88	Dale Jarrett	Robert Yates Racing	Ford	28.789	192.574
2	8	Dale Earnhardt Jr. (R)	Dale Earnhardt, Inc.	Chevrolet	28.825	192.333
3	1	Steve Park	Dale Earnhardt, Inc.	Chevrolet	28.842	192.220
4	17	Matt Kenseth (R)	Roush Racing	Ford	28.854	192.140
5	16	Kevin Lepage	Roush Racing	Ford	28.863	192.080
6	25	Jerry Nadeau	Hendrick Motorsports	Chevrolet	28.866	192.060
7	24	Jeff Gordon	Hendrick Motorsports	Chevrolet	28.883	191.947
8	33	Joe Nemechek	Andy Petree Racing	Chevrolet	28.926	191.661
9	93	Dave Blaney (R)	Bill Davis Racing	Pontiac	28.963	191.417
10	94	Bill Elliott	Bill Elliott Racing	Ford	28.979	191.311
11	6	Mark Martin	Roush Racing	Ford	28.993	191.219
12	77	Robert Pressley	Jasper Motorsports	Ford	28.995	191.205
13	97	Chad Little	Roush Racing	Ford	28.997	191.192
14	31	Mike Skinner	Richard Childress Racing	Chevrolet	29.014	191.080
15	27	Jeff Fuller (R)	Eel River Racing	Pontiac	29.016	191.067
16	11	Brett Bodine	Brett Bodine Racing	Ford	29.024	191.014
17	9	Stacy Compton (R)	Melling Racing	Ford	29.038	190.922
18	22	Ward Burton	Bill Davis Racing	Pontiac	29.077	190.666
19	26	Jimmy Spencer	Haas-Carter Motorsports	Ford	29.078	190.660
20	32	Scott Pruett (R)	PPI Motorsports	Ford	29.124	190.358
21	75	Wally Dallenbach Jr.	Galaxy Motorsports	Ford	29.138	190.267
22	18	Bobby Labonte	Joe Gibbs Racing	Pontiac	29.151	190.182
23	43	John Andretti	Petty Enterprises	Pontiac	29.178	190.006
24	91	Todd Bodine	LJ Racing	Chevrolet	29.195	189.896
25	41	Rick Mast	Larry Hedrick Motorsports	Chevrolet	29.220	189.733
26	55	Kenny Wallace	Andy Petree Racing	Chevrolet	29.226	189.694
27	20	Tony Stewart	Joe Gibbs Racing	Pontiac	29.255	189.506
28	7	Michael Waltrip	Mattei Motorsports	Chevrolet	29.291	189.273
29	99	Jeff Burton	Roush Racing	Ford	29.292	189.267
30	2	Rusty Wallace	Penske-Kranefuss Racing	Ford	29.309	189.157
31	21	Elliott Sadler	Wood Brothers Racing	Ford	29.314	189.125
32	42	Kenny Irwin Jr.	Team SABCO	Chevrolet	29.319	189.092
33	12	Jeremy Mayfield	Penske-Kranefuss Racing	Ford	29.320	189.086
34	28	Ricky Rudd	Robert Yates Racing	Ford	29.323	189.067
35	3	Dale Earnhardt	Richard Childress Racing	Chevrolet	29.359	188.835
36	15	Derrike Cope	Fenley-Moore Motorsports	Ford	29.380	188.700
Provisionals
37	5	Terry Labonte	Hendrick Motorsports	Chevrolet	—	—
38	4	Bobby Hamilton	Morgan–McClure Motorsports	Chevrolet	—	—
39	40	Sterling Marlin	Team SABCO	Chevrolet	—	—
40	44	Kyle Petty	Petty Enterprises	Pontiac	—	—
41	60	Ted Musgrave	Joe Bessey Racing	Chevrolet	—	—
42	36	Ken Schrader	MB2 Motorsports	Pontiac	—	—
43	66	Darrell Waltrip	Haas-Carter Motorsports	Ford	—	—
Failed to qualify
44	71	Dave Marcis	Marcis Auto Racing	Chevrolet	29.453	188.232
45	90	Ed Berrier	Donlavey Racing	Ford	29.457	188.207
46	10	Johnny Benson Jr.	Tyler Jet Motorsports	Pontiac	29.469	188.130
47	14	Mike Bliss (R)	A. J. Foyt Racing	Pontiac	29.624	187.146
48	13	Robby Gordon	Team Menard	Ford	29.694	186.704
Official qualifying results

== Race results ==
Fin	St	#	Driver	Team	Make	Laps	Led	Status	Pts
1	35	3	Dale Earnhardt	Richard Childress Racing	Chevrolet	325	34	Running	180
2	22	18	Bobby Labonte	Joe Gibbs Racing	Pontiac	325	46	Running	175
3	11	6	Mark Martin	Roush Racing	Ford	325	7	Running	170
4	3	1	Steve Park	Dale Earnhardt, Inc.	Chevrolet	325	1	Running	165
5	8	33	Joe Nemechek	Andy Petree Racing	Chevrolet	325	0	Running	155
6	13	97	Chad Little	Roush Racing	Ford	325	2	Running	155
7	24	91	Todd Bodine	LJ Racing	Chevrolet	325	0	Running	146
8	18	22	Ward Burton	Bill Davis Racing	Pontiac	324	0	Running	142
9	7	24	Jeff Gordon	Hendrick Motorsports	Chevrolet	324	4	Running	143
10	10	94	Bill Elliott	Bill Elliott Racing	Ford	324	3	Running	139
11	34	28	Ricky Rudd	Robert Yates Racing	Ford	324	0	Running	130
12	39	40	Sterling Marlin	Team SABCO	Chevrolet	324	0	Running	127
13	38	4	Bobby Hamilton	Morgan–McClure Motorsports	Chevrolet	324	0	Running	124
14	31	21	Elliott Sadler	Wood Brothers Racing	Ford	324	2	Running	126
15	37	5	Terry Labonte	Hendrick Motorsports	Chevrolet	324	0	Running	118
16	16	11	Brett Bodine	Brett Bodine Racing	Ford	324	1	Running	120
17	19	26	Jimmy Spencer	Haas-Carter Motorsports	Ford	324	0	Running	112
18	23	43	John Andretti	Petty Enterprises	Pontiac	324	0	Running	109
19	36	15	Derrike Cope	Fenley-Moore Motorsports	Ford	323	0	Running	106
20	9	93	Dave Blaney (R)	Bill Davis Racing	Pontiac	322	0	Running	103
21	25	41	Rick Mast	Larry Hedrick Motorsports	Chevrolet	322	0	Running	100
22	15	27	Jeff Fuller (R)	Eel River Racing	Pontiac	322	0	Running	97
23	42	36	Ken Schrader	MB2 Motorsports	Pontiac	322	0	Running	94
24	32	42	Kenny Irwin Jr.	Team SABCO	Chevrolet	322	0	Running	91
25	38	7	Michael Waltrip	Mattei Motorsports	Chevrolet	319	0	Engine	88
26	40	44	Kyle Petty	Petty Enterprises	Pontiac	319	0	Running	85
27	41	60	Ted Musgrave	Joe Bessey Racing	Chevrolet	318	2	Running	87
28	33	12	Jeremy Mayfield	Penske-Kranefuss Racing	Ford	310	0	Running	79
29	2	8	Dale Earnhardt Jr. (R)	Dale Earnhardt, Inc.	Chevrolet	307	8	Running	81
30	14	31	Mike Skinner	Richard Childress Racing	Chevrolet	305	191	Engine	83
31	43	66	Darrell Waltrip	Haas-Carter Motorsports	Ford	298	0	Running	70
32	30	2	Rusty Wallace	Penske-Kranefuss Racing	Ford	274	0	Accident	67
33	12	77	Robert Pressley	Jasper Motorsports	Ford	271	0	Accident	64
34	27	20	Tony Stewart	Joe Gibbs Racing	Pontiac	270	0	Accident	61
35	17	9	Stacy Compton (R)	Melling Racing	Ford	264	0	Running	58
36	1	88	Dale Jarrett	Robert Yates Racing	Ford	257	5	Engine	60
37	26	55	Kenny Wallace	Andy Petree Racing	Chevrolet	253	0	Engine	52
38	5	16	Kevin Lepage	Roush Racing	Ford	238	8	Running	54
39	21	75	Wally Dallenbach Jr.	Galaxy Motorsports	Ford	208	0	Accident	46
40	4	17	Matt Kenseth (R)	Roush Racing	Ford	199	2	Engine	48
41	20	32	Scott Pruett (R)	PPI Motorsports	Ford	177	0	Accident	40
42	6	25	Jerry Nadeau	Hendrick Motorsports	Chevrolet	135	5	Engine	42
43	29	99	Jeff Burton	Roush Racing	Ford	68	5	Accident	39
Official race results

== Media ==
=== Television ===
The race was aired live on ABC in the United States for the twenty ninth and final time Bob Jenkins, 1973 Cup Series champion Benny Parsons and two-time Cracker Barrel Old Country Store 500 winning crew chief Ray Evernham called the race from the broadcast booth. Jerry Punch, Bill Weber and John Kernan handled pit road for the television side.

ABC
Booth announcers		Pit reporters
Lap-by-lap	Color-commentators	Pit reporters
Bob Jenkins	Benny Parsons; Ray Evernham	Jerry Punch; Bill Weber; John Kernan

Previous race: 2000 CarsDirect.com 400	NASCAR Winston Cup Series; 2000 season	Next race: 2000 Mall.com 400
