= 2000 Mall.com 400 =

Fifth race of the 2000 NASCAR Winston Cup Series

Race details
- Race 5 of 36 in the 2000 NASCAR Winston Cup Series
- The 2000 Mall.com 400 program cover, featuring Jeff Burton.
- Date: March 19, 2000
- Official name: 44th Annual Mall.com 400
- Location: Darlington, South Carolina, Darlington Raceway
- Course: Permanent racing facility
- Course length: 1.366 miles (2.198 km)
- Distance: 293 laps, 400.238 mi (644.121 km)
- Average speed: 128.076 miles per hour (206.118 km/h)

Pole position
Driver	Jeff Gordon	Hendrick Motorsports
- Time: 28.481

Most laps led
Driver	Ward Burton	Bill Davis Racing
- Laps: 188

Winner
No. 22	Ward Burton	Bill Davis Racing

Television in the United States
- Network: ESPN
- Announcers: Jerry Punch, Ned Jarrett, Benny Parsons

Radio in the United States
- Radio: Motor Racing Network

The 2000 Mall.com 400 was the fifth stock car race of the 2000 NASCAR Winston Cup Series and the 44th iteration of the event. The race was held on Sunday, March 19, 2000, in Darlington, South Carolina, at Darlington Raceway, a 1.366 miles (2.198 km) permanent egg-shaped oval racetrack. The race took the scheduled 293 laps to complete. At race's end, Bill Davis Racing's Ward Burton dominated the late laps of the race to take his second career NASCAR Winston Cup Series victory, his only victory of the season, and his first victory in 131 races. To fill out the top three, Robert Yates Racing's Dale Jarrett and Richard Childress Racing's Dale Earnhardt finished second and third, respectively.

== Background ==
The layout of Darlington Raceway, the venue where the race was held.

Darlington Raceway is a race track built for NASCAR racing located near Darlington, South Carolina. It is nicknamed "The Lady in Black" and "The Track Too Tough to Tame" by many NASCAR fans and drivers and advertised as "A NASCAR Tradition." It is of a unique, somewhat egg-shaped design, an oval with the ends of very different configurations, a condition which supposedly arose from the proximity of one end of the track to a minnow pond the owner refused to relocate. This situation makes it very challenging for the crews to set up their cars' handling in a way that is effective at both ends.

=== Entry list ===
- (R) denotes rookie driver.

#	Driver	Team	Make
1	Steve Park	Dale Earnhardt, Inc.	Chevrolet
2	Rusty Wallace	Penske-Kranefuss Racing	Ford
3	Dale Earnhardt	Richard Childress Racing	Chevrolet
4	Bobby Hamilton	Morgan–McClure Motorsports	Chevrolet
5	Terry Labonte	Hendrick Motorsports	Chevrolet
6	Mark Martin	Roush Racing	Ford
7	Michael Waltrip	Mattei Motorsports	Chevrolet
8	Dale Earnhardt Jr. (R)	Dale Earnhardt, Inc.	Chevrolet
9	Stacy Compton (R)	Melling Racing	Ford
10	Johnny Benson Jr.	Tyler Jet Motorsports	Pontiac
11	Brett Bodine	Brett Bodine Racing	Ford
12	Jeremy Mayfield	Penske-Kranefuss Racing	Ford
13	Robby Gordon	Team Menard	Ford
14	Dick Trickle	A. J. Foyt Enterprises	Pontiac
15	Derrike Cope	Fenley-Moore Motorsports	Ford
16	Kevin Lepage	Roush Racing	Ford
17	Matt Kenseth (R)	Roush Racing	Ford
18	Bobby Labonte	Joe Gibbs Racing	Pontiac
20	Tony Stewart	Joe Gibbs Racing	Pontiac
21	Elliott Sadler	Wood Brothers Racing	Ford
22	Ward Burton	Bill Davis Racing	Pontiac
24	Jeff Gordon	Hendrick Motorsports	Chevrolet
25	Jerry Nadeau	Hendrick Motorsports	Chevrolet
26	Jimmy Spencer	Haas-Carter Motorsports	Ford
27	Jeff Fuller	Eel River Racing	Pontiac
28	Ricky Rudd	Robert Yates Racing	Ford
31	Mike Skinner	Richard Childress Racing	Chevrolet
32	Scott Pruett (R)	PPI Motorsports	Ford
33	Joe Nemechek	Andy Petree Racing	Chevrolet
36	Ken Schrader	MB2 Motorsports	Pontiac
40	Sterling Marlin	Team SABCO	Chevrolet
41	Rick Mast	Larry Hedrick Motorsports	Chevrolet
42	Kenny Irwin Jr.	Team SABCO	Chevrolet
43	John Andretti	Petty Enterprises	Pontiac
44	Kyle Petty	Petty Enterprises	Pontiac
50	Ricky Craven	Midwest Transit Racing	Chevrolet
55	Kenny Wallace	Andy Petree Racing	Chevrolet
60	Ted Musgrave	Joe Bessey Racing	Chevrolet
66	Darrell Waltrip	Haas-Carter Motorsports	Ford
71	Dave Marcis	Marcis Auto Racing	Chevrolet
75	Wally Dallenbach Jr.	Galaxy Motorsports	Ford
77	Robert Pressley	Jasper Motorsports	Ford
88	Dale Jarrett	Robert Yates Racing	Ford
90	Ed Berrier (R)	Donlavey Racing	Ford
93	Dave Blaney (R)	Bill Davis Racing	Pontiac
94	Bill Elliott	Bill Elliott Racing	Ford
97	Chad Little	Roush Racing	Ford
99	Jeff Burton	Roush Racing	Ford
Official entry list

== Practice ==
=== First practice ===
The first practice session was held on Friday, March 17, at 11:00 AM EST. The session would last for one hour and 15 minutes. Roush Racing's Jeff Burton set the fastest time in the session, with a lap of 28.923 and an average speed of 170.024 mph (273.627 km/h).

Pos.	#	Driver	Team	Make	Time	Speed
1	99	Jeff Burton	Roush Racing	Ford	28.923	170.024
2	3	Dale Earnhardt	Richard Childress Racing	Chevrolet	28.982	169.678
3	2	Rusty Wallace	Penske-Kranefuss Racing	Ford	29.025	169.426
Full first practice results

=== Second practice ===
The second practice session was held on Friday, March 17, at 1:00 PM EST. The session would last for 45 minutes. Hendrick Motorsports's Jeff Gordon set the fastest time in the session, with a lap of 28.747 and an average speed of 171.065 mph (275.302 km/h).

Pos.	#	Driver	Team	Make	Time	Speed
1	24	Jeff Gordon	Hendrick Motorsports	Chevrolet	28.747	171.065
2	28	Ricky Rudd	Robert Yates Racing	Ford	28.833	170.555
3	18	Bobby Labonte	Joe Gibbs Racing	Pontiac	28.844	170.490
Full second practice results

=== Third practice ===
The third practice session was held on Saturday, March 18, at 9:30 AM EST. The session would last for one hour and 30 minutes. Dale Earnhardt, Inc.'s Dale Earnhardt Jr. set the fastest time in the session, with a lap of 29.611 and an average speed of 166.073 mph (267.269 km/h).

Pos.	#	Driver	Team	Make	Time	Speed
1	8	Dale Earnhardt Jr. (R)	Dale Earnhardt, Inc.	Chevrolet	29.611	166.073
2	18	Bobby Labonte	Joe Gibbs Racing	Pontiac	29.648	165.866
3	22	Ward Burton	Bill Davis Racing	Pontiac	29.712	165.508
Full third practice results

=== Final practice ===
The final practice session, sometimes referred to as Happy Hour, was held on Saturday, March 18, after the 2000 SunCom 200. The session would last for one hour. Roush Racing's Mark Martin set the fastest time in the session, with a lap of 29.516 and an average speed of 166.607 mph (268.128 km/h).

Pos.	#	Driver	Team	Make	Time	Speed
1	6	Mark Martin	Roush Racing	Ford	29.516	166.607
2	22	Ward Burton	Bill Davis Racing	Pontiac	29.565	166.331
3	12	Jeremy Mayfield	Penske-Kranefuss Racing	Ford	29.571	166.298
Full final practice results

== Qualifying ==
Qualifying was split into two rounds. The first round was held on Friday, March 17, at 3:30 PM EST. Each driver would have two laps to set a fastest time; the fastest of the two would count as their official qualifying lap. During the first round, the top 25 drivers in the round would be guaranteed a starting spot in the race. If a driver was not able to guarantee a spot in the first round, they had the option to scrub their time from the first round and try and run a faster lap time in a second round qualifying run, held on Saturday, March 18, at 11:30 AM EST. As with the first round, each driver would have two laps to set a fastest time; the fastest of the two would count as their official qualifying lap. Positions 26–36 would be decided on time, while positions 37–43 would be based on provisionals. Six spots were awarded by the use of provisionals based on owner's points. The seventh was awarded to a past champion who has not otherwise qualified for the race. If no past champion needs the provisional, the next team in the owner points was awarded a provisional.

Jeff Gordon, driving for Hendrick Motorsports, would win the pole, setting a time of 28.481 and an average speed of 172.662 miles per hour (277.873 km/h) in the first round.

Five drivers failed to qualify.

=== Full qualifying results ===
Pos.	#	Driver	Team	Make	Time	Speed
1	24	Jeff Gordon	Hendrick Motorsports	Chevrolet	28.481	172.662
2	16	Kevin Lepage	Roush Racing	Ford	28.552	172.233
3	22	Ward Burton	Bill Davis Racing	Pontiac	28.557	172.203
4	3	Dale Earnhardt	Richard Childress Racing	Chevrolet	28.685	171.435
5	6	Mark Martin	Roush Racing	Ford	28.729	171.172
6	21	Elliott Sadler	Wood Brothers Racing	Ford	28.739	171.112
7	18	Bobby Labonte	Joe Gibbs Racing	Pontiac	28.792	170.797
8	94	Bill Elliott	Bill Elliott Racing	Ford	28.798	170.762
9	20	Tony Stewart	Joe Gibbs Racing	Pontiac	28.832	170.560
10	8	Dale Earnhardt Jr. (R)	Dale Earnhardt, Inc.	Chevrolet	28.839	170.519
11	43	John Andretti	Petty Enterprises	Pontiac	28.855	170.425
12	14	Dick Trickle	A. J. Foyt Racing	Pontiac	28.863	170.377
13	77	Robert Pressley	Jasper Motorsports	Ford	28.866	170.360
14	27	Jeff Fuller	Eel River Racing	Pontiac	28.867	170.354
15	93	Dave Blaney (R)	Bill Davis Racing	Pontiac	28.874	170.312
16	17	Matt Kenseth (R)	Roush Racing	Ford	28.891	170.212
17	88	Dale Jarrett	Robert Yates Racing	Ford	28.899	170.165
18	42	Kenny Irwin Jr.	Team SABCO	Chevrolet	28.902	170.147
19	25	Jerry Nadeau	Hendrick Motorsports	Chevrolet	28.902	170.147
20	2	Rusty Wallace	Penske-Kranefuss Racing	Ford	28.915	170.071
21	12	Jeremy Mayfield	Penske-Kranefuss Racing	Ford	28.916	170.065
22	28	Ricky Rudd	Robert Yates Racing	Ford	28.938	169.936
23	31	Mike Skinner	Richard Childress Racing	Chevrolet	28.949	169.871
24	26	Jimmy Spencer	Haas-Carter Motorsports	Ford	28.950	169.865
25	55	Kenny Wallace	Andy Petree Racing	Chevrolet	28.964	169.783
Failed to lock in the first round
26	71	Dave Marcis	Marcis Auto Racing	Chevrolet	28.977	169.707
27	99	Jeff Burton	Roush Racing	Ford	28.980	169.689
28	40	Sterling Marlin	Team SABCO	Chevrolet	28.988	169.643
29	10	Johnny Benson Jr.	Tyler Jet Motorsports	Pontiac	28.988	169.643
30	33	Joe Nemechek	Andy Petree Racing	Chevrolet	28.988	169.643
31	1	Steve Park	Dale Earnhardt, Inc.	Chevrolet	28.996	169.596
32	11	Brett Bodine	Brett Bodine Racing	Ford	29.000	169.572
33	4	Bobby Hamilton	Morgan–McClure Motorsports	Chevrolet	29.003	169.555
34	5	Terry Labonte	Hendrick Motorsports	Chevrolet	29.008	169.526
35	7	Michael Waltrip	Mattei Motorsports	Chevrolet	29.020	169.456
36	36	Ken Schrader	MB2 Motorsports	Pontiac	29.053	169.263
Provisionals
37	97	Chad Little	Roush Racing	Ford	-*	-*
38	44	Kyle Petty	Petty Enterprises	Pontiac	-*	-*
39	60	Ted Musgrave	Joe Bessey Racing	Chevrolet	-*	-*
40	13	Robby Gordon	Team Menard	Ford	-*	-*
41	41	Rick Mast	Larry Hedrick Motorsports	Chevrolet	-*	-*
42	9	Stacy Compton (R)	Melling Racing	Ford	-*	-*
43	66	Darrell Waltrip	Haas-Carter Motorsports	Ford	-*	-*
Failed to qualify
44	15	Derrike Cope	Fenley-Moore Motorsports	Ford	29.371	167.430
45	50	Ricky Craven	Midwest Transit Racing	Chevrolet	29.401	167.260
46	32	Scott Pruett (R)	PPI Motorsports	Ford	29.494	166.732
47	75	Wally Dallenbach Jr.	Galaxy Motorsports	Ford	29.680	165.687
48	90	Ed Berrier (R)	Donlavey Racing	Ford	29.806	164.987
Official first round qualifying results
Official starting lineup

== Race results ==
Fin	St	#	Driver	Team	Make	Laps	Led	Status	Pts	Winnings
1	3	22	Ward Burton	Bill Davis Racing	Pontiac	293	188	running	185	$132,725
2	17	88	Dale Jarrett	Robert Yates Racing	Ford	293	26	running	175	$90,905
3	4	3	Dale Earnhardt	Richard Childress Racing	Chevrolet	293	0	running	165	$68,590
4	9	20	Tony Stewart	Joe Gibbs Racing	Pontiac	293	0	running	160	$68,230
5	27	99	Jeff Burton	Roush Racing	Ford	293	0	running	155	$65,925
6	16	17	Matt Kenseth (R)	Roush Racing	Ford	293	3	running	155	$47,575
7	33	4	Bobby Hamilton	Morgan–McClure Motorsports	Chevrolet	293	19	running	151	$45,820
8	1	24	Jeff Gordon	Hendrick Motorsports	Chevrolet	293	22	running	147	$56,915
10	2	16	Kevin Lepage	Roush Racing	Ford	293	1	running	139	$54,630
9	5	6	Mark Martin	Roush Racing	Ford	293	0	running	138	$48,010
11	34	5	Terry Labonte	Hendrick Motorsports	Chevrolet	293	0	running	130	$47,250
12	6	21	Elliott Sadler	Wood Brothers Racing	Ford	293	0	running	127	$41,945
13	7	18	Bobby Labonte	Joe Gibbs Racing	Pontiac	292	34	running	129	$48,290
14	23	31	Mike Skinner	Richard Childress Racing	Chevrolet	292	0	running	121	$40,410
15	37	97	Chad Little	Roush Racing	Ford	292	0	running	118	$43,130
16	20	2	Rusty Wallace	Penske-Kranefuss Racing	Ford	292	0	running	115	$45,685
17	22	28	Ricky Rudd	Robert Yates Racing	Ford	292	0	running	112	$39,440
18	13	77	Robert Pressley	Jasper Motorsports	Ford	292	0	running	109	$31,020
19	8	94	Bill Elliott	Bill Elliott Racing	Ford	292	0	running	106	$38,690
20	11	43	John Andretti	Petty Enterprises	Pontiac	291	0	running	103	$49,220
21	28	40	Sterling Marlin	Team SABCO	Chevrolet	291	0	running	100	$41,805
22	36	36	Ken Schrader	MB2 Motorsports	Pontiac	291	0	running	97	$29,790
23	24	26	Jimmy Spencer	Haas-Carter Motorsports	Ford	291	0	running	94	$37,975
24	29	10	Johnny Benson Jr.	Tyler Jet Motorsports	Pontiac	290	0	running	91	$29,160
25	38	44	Kyle Petty	Petty Enterprises	Pontiac	290	0	running	88	$37,245
26	15	93	Dave Blaney (R)	Bill Davis Racing	Pontiac	290	0	running	85	$25,435
27	32	11	Brett Bodine	Brett Bodine Racing	Ford	290	0	running	82	$25,250
28	40	13	Robby Gordon	Team Menard	Ford	289	0	running	79	$25,095
29	42	9	Stacy Compton (R)	Melling Racing	Ford	288	0	running	76	$28,590
30	41	41	Rick Mast	Larry Hedrick Motorsports	Chevrolet	288	0	running	73	$28,260
31	12	14	Dick Trickle	A. J. Foyt Racing	Pontiac	287	0	running	70	$24,605
32	35	7	Michael Waltrip	Mattei Motorsports	Chevrolet	282	0	running	67	$35,475
33	26	71	Dave Marcis	Marcis Auto Racing	Chevrolet	281	0	running	64	$24,295
34	21	12	Jeremy Mayfield	Penske-Kranefuss Racing	Ford	281	0	running	61	$34,665
35	25	55	Kenny Wallace	Andy Petree Racing	Chevrolet	255	0	engine	58	$32,035
36	14	27	Jeff Fuller	Eel River Racing	Pontiac	232	0	running	55	$23,905
37	19	25	Jerry Nadeau	Hendrick Motorsports	Chevrolet	232	0	running	52	$31,800
38	18	42	Kenny Irwin Jr.	Team SABCO	Chevrolet	219	0	running	49	$31,675
39	31	1	Steve Park	Dale Earnhardt, Inc.	Chevrolet	218	0	engine	46	$31,550
40	10	8	Dale Earnhardt Jr. (R)	Dale Earnhardt, Inc.	Chevrolet	213	0	accident	43	$23,375
41	30	33	Joe Nemechek	Andy Petree Racing	Chevrolet	186	0	running	40	$31,250
42	39	60	Ted Musgrave	Joe Bessey Racing	Chevrolet	135	0	engine	37	$31,125
43	43	66	Darrell Waltrip	Haas-Carter Motorsports	Ford	116	0	handling	34	$23,271
Failed to qualify
44		15	Derrike Cope	Fenley-Moore Motorsports	Ford					
45		50	Ricky Craven	Midwest Transit Racing	Chevrolet					
46		32	Scott Pruett (R)	PPI Motorsports	Ford					
47		75	Wally Dallenbach Jr.	Galaxy Motorsports	Ford					
48		90	Ed Berrier (R)	Donlavey Racing	Ford					
Official race results

== Media ==
=== Television ===
The race was aired live on ESPN. Jerry Punch, 1973 Cup Series champion Benny Parsons and two-time NASCAR Cup Series champion Ned Jarrett called the race from the broadcast booth. Punch filled in for regular commentator Bob Jenkins was covering ABC's coverage of the MCI WorldCom Indy 200 IndyCar Series race at Phoenix International Raceway. Bill Weber, John Kernan and Ray Dunlap handled pit road for the television side.

ESPN
Booth announcers		Pit reporters
Lap-by-lap	Color-commentators	Pit reporters
Jerry Punch	Ned Jarrett; Benny Parsons	Bill Weber; John Kernan; Ray Dunlap

== Standings after the race ==
Drivers' Championship standings

	Pos	Driver	Points
	1	Bobby Labonte	794
	2	Mark Martin	785 (−9)
	3	Dale Earnhardt	762 (−32)
1	4	Ward Burton	733 (−61)
1	5	Dale Jarrett	721 (−73)
2	6	Tony Stewart	663 (−131)
3	7	Bill Elliott	663 (−131)
1	8	Ricky Rudd	647 (−147)
4	9	Jeff Burton	621 (−173)
1	10	Rusty Wallace	595 (−199)
Official driver's standings

- Note: Only the first 10 positions are included for the driver standings.

Previous race: 2000 Cracker Barrel Old Country Store 500	NASCAR Winston Cup Series; 2000 season	Next race: 2000 Food City 500
