= 2000 Dura Lube/Kmart 400 =

Second race of the 2000 NASCAR Winston Cup Series

Race details
- Race 2 of 34 in the 2000 NASCAR Winston Cup Series
- Date: February 27, 2000
- Official name: 35th Annual Dura Lube/Kmart 400
- Location: Rockingham, North Carolina, North Carolina Speedway
- Course: Permanent racing facility
- Course length: 1.017 miles (1.637 km)
- Distance: 393 laps, 399.681 mi (643.224 km)
- Scheduled distance: 393 laps, 399.681 mi (643.224 km)
- Average speed: 127.875 miles per hour (205.795 km/h)

Pole position
Driver	Rusty Wallace	Penske-Kranefuss Racing
- Time: 23.167

Most laps led
Driver	Bobby Labonte	Joe Gibbs Racing
- Laps: 134

Winner
No. 18	Bobby Labonte	Joe Gibbs Racing

Television in the United States
- Network: TNN
- Announcers: Eli Gold, Buddy Baker, Dick Berggren

Radio in the United States
- Radio: Motor Racing Network

The 2000 Dura Lube/Kmart 400 was the second stock car race of the 2000 NASCAR Winston Cup Series and the 35th iteration of the event. The race was held on Sunday, February 27, 2000, in Rockingham, North Carolina at North Carolina Speedway, a 1.017 miles (1.637 km) permanent D-shaped oval racetrack. The race took the scheduled 393 laps to complete. At race's end, Bobby Labonte, driving for Joe Gibbs Racing, would hold off Dale Earnhardt and win after leading the final 113 laps. This was Labonte's 13th career NASCAR Winston Cup Series win and his first of the season. To fill out the podium, Dale Earnhardt of Richard Childress Racing and Ward Burton of Bill Davis Racing would finish second and third, respectively.

== Background ==
North Carolina Speedway was opened as a flat, one-mile oval on October 31, 1965. In 1969, the track was extensively reconfigured to a high-banked, D-shaped oval just over one mile in length. In 1997, North Carolina Motor Speedway merged with Penske Motorsports, and was renamed North Carolina Speedway. Shortly thereafter, the infield was reconfigured, and competition on the infield road course, mostly by the SCCA, was discontinued. Currently, the track is home to the Fast Track High Performance Driving School.

=== Entry list ===
- (R) - denotes rookie driver

#	Driver	Team	Make
1	Steve Park	Dale Earnhardt, Inc.	Chevrolet
2	Rusty Wallace	Penske-Kranefuss Racing	Ford
3	Dale Earnhardt	Richard Childress Racing	Chevrolet
4	Bobby Hamilton	Morgan–McClure Motorsports	Chevrolet
5	Terry Labonte	Hendrick Motorsports	Chevrolet
6	Mark Martin	Roush Racing	Ford
7	Michael Waltrip	Mattei Motorsports	Chevrolet
8	Dale Earnhardt Jr. (R)	Dale Earnhardt, Inc.	Chevrolet
9	Stacy Compton (R)	Melling Racing	Ford
10	Johnny Benson Jr.	Tyler Jet Motorsports	Pontiac
11	Brett Bodine	Brett Bodine Racing	Ford
12	Jeremy Mayfield	Penske-Kranefuss Racing	Ford
13	Robby Gordon	Team Menard	Ford
14	Mike Bliss (R)	A. J. Foyt Racing	Pontiac
16	Kevin Lepage	Roush Racing	Ford
17	Matt Kenseth (R)	Roush Racing	Ford
18	Bobby Labonte	Joe Gibbs Racing	Pontiac
20	Tony Stewart	Joe Gibbs Racing	Pontiac
21	Elliott Sadler	Wood Brothers Racing	Ford
22	Ward Burton	Bill Davis Racing	Pontiac
24	Jeff Gordon	Hendrick Motorsports	Chevrolet
25	Jerry Nadeau	Hendrick Motorsports	Chevrolet
26	Jimmy Spencer	Haas-Carter Motorsports	Ford
27	Jeff Fuller (R)	Eel River Racing	Pontiac
28	Ricky Rudd	Robert Yates Racing	Ford
31	Mike Skinner	Richard Childress Racing	Chevrolet
32	Scott Pruett (R)	PPI Motorsports	Ford
33	Joe Nemechek	Andy Petree Racing	Chevrolet
36	Ken Schrader	MB2 Motorsports	Pontiac
40	Sterling Marlin	Team SABCO	Chevrolet
41	Rick Mast	Larry Hedrick Motorsports	Chevrolet
42	Kenny Irwin Jr.	Team SABCO	Chevrolet
43	John Andretti	Petty Enterprises	Pontiac
44	Kyle Petty	Petty Enterprises	Pontiac
50	Ricky Craven	Midwest Transit Racing	Chevrolet
55	Kenny Wallace	Andy Petree Racing	Chevrolet
60	Ted Musgrave	Joe Bessey Racing	Chevrolet
66	Darrell Waltrip	Haas-Carter Motorsports	Ford
71	Dave Marcis	Marcis Auto Racing	Chevrolet
75	Wally Dallenbach Jr.	Galaxy Motorsports	Ford
77	Robert Pressley	Jasper Motorsports	Ford
88	Dale Jarrett	Robert Yates Racing	Ford
90	Ed Berrier	Donlavey Racing	Ford
93	Dave Blaney (R)	Bill Davis Racing	Pontiac
94	Bill Elliott	Bill Elliott Racing	Ford
97	Chad Little	Roush Racing	Ford
99	Jeff Burton	Roush Racing	Ford
Official entry list

== Practice ==
=== First practice ===
The first practice session was held on Friday, February 25, at 10:00 AM EST, and would last for one hour and 15 minutes. Mark Martin of Roush Racing would set the fastest time in the session, with a lap of 23.500 and an average speed of 155.795 miles per hour (250.728 km/h).

Pos.	#	Driver	Team	Make	Time	Speed
1	6	Mark Martin	Roush Racing	Ford	23.500	155.795
2	22	Ward Burton	Bill Davis Racing	Pontiac	23.506	155.755
3	17	Matt Kenseth (R)	Roush Racing	Ford	23.573	155.313
Full first practice results

=== Second and final practice ===
The second and final practice session, sometimes referred to as Happy Hour, was held on Saturday, February 26. Ward Burton of Bill Davis Racing would set the fastest time in the session, with a lap of 23.986 and an average speed of 152.639 miles per hour (245.649 km/h).

Pos.	#	Driver	Team	Make	Time	Speed
1	22	Ward Burton	Bill Davis Racing	Pontiac	23.986	152.639
2	4	Bobby Hamilton	Morgan–McClure Motorsports	Chevrolet	24.007	152.505
3	55	Kenny Wallace	Andy Petree Racing	Chevrolet	24.208	151.239
Full Happy Hour practice results

== Qualifying ==
Qualifying was held on Friday, February 25, at 2:30 PM EST. Each driver would have one lap to set a fastest time; and that lap would count as their official qualifying lap. Positions 1-36 would be decided on time, while positions 37-43 would be based on provisionals. Six spots are awarded by the use of provisionals based on owner's points. The seventh is awarded to a past champion who has not otherwise qualified for the race. If no past champ needs the provisional, the next team in the owner points will be awarded a provisional.

Rusty Wallace of Penske-Kranefuss Racing would win the pole, setting a time of 23.167 and an average speed of 158.035 miles per hour (254.333 km/h).

Four drivers would fail to qualify: Ricky Craven, Scott Pruett, Dave Blaney, and Mike Bliss.

=== Full qualifying results ===
Pos.	#	Driver	Team	Make	Time	Speed
1	2	Rusty Wallace	Penske-Kranefuss Racing	Ford	23.167	158.035
2	28	Ricky Rudd	Robert Yates Racing	Ford	23.315	157.032
3	18	Bobby Labonte	Joe Gibbs Racing	Pontiac	23.320	156.998
4	3	Dale Earnhardt	Richard Childress Racing	Chevrolet	23.354	156.770
5	24	Jeff Gordon	Hendrick Motorsports	Chevrolet	23.356	156.756
6	17	Matt Kenseth (R)	Roush Racing	Ford	23.376	156.622
7	8	Dale Earnhardt Jr. (R)	Dale Earnhardt, Inc.	Chevrolet	23.397	156.482
8	33	Joe Nemechek	Andy Petree Racing	Chevrolet	23.403	156.441
9	94	Bill Elliott	Bill Elliott Racing	Ford	23.410	156.395
10	66	Darrell Waltrip	Haas-Carter Motorsports	Ford	23.416	156.355
11	22	Ward Burton	Bill Davis Racing	Pontiac	23.426	156.288
12	31	Mike Skinner	Richard Childress Racing	Chevrolet	23.428	156.275
13	44	Kyle Petty	Petty Enterprises	Pontiac	23.446	156.155
14	40	Sterling Marlin	Team SABCO	Chevrolet	23.475	155.962
15	20	Tony Stewart	Joe Gibbs Racing	Chevrolet	23.478	155.942
16	99	Jeff Burton	Roush Racing	Ford	23.504	155.769
17	5	Terry Labonte	Hendrick Motorsports	Chevrolet	23.506	155.756
18	1	Steve Park	Dale Earnhardt, Inc.	Chevrolet	23.508	155.743
19	55	Kenny Wallace	Andy Petree Racing	Chevrolet	23.529	155.604
20	43	John Andretti	Petty Enterprises	Pontiac	23.531	155.590
21	9	Stacy Compton (R)	Melling Racing	Ford	23.534	155.571
22	25	Jerry Nadeau	Hendrick Motorsports	Chevrolet	23.537	155.551
23	88	Dale Jarrett	Robert Yates Racing	Ford	23.546	155.491
24	7	Michael Waltrip	Mattei Motorsports	Chevrolet	23.555	155.432
25	13	Robby Gordon	Team Menard	Ford	23.569	155.340
26	21	Elliott Sadler	Wood Brothers Racing	Ford	23.577	155.287
27	12	Jeremy Mayfield	Penske-Kranefuss Racing	Ford	23.617	155.024
28	16	Kevin Lepage	Roush Racing	Ford	23.619	155.011
29	41	Rick Mast	Larry Hedrick Motorsports	Chevrolet	23.621	154.998
30	27	Jeff Fuller (R)	Eel River Racing	Pontiac	23.621	154.998
31	42	Kenny Irwin Jr.	Team SABCO	Chevrolet	23.635	154.906
32	11	Brett Bodine	Brett Bodine Racing	Ford	23.644	154.847
33	6	Mark Martin	Roush Racing	Ford	23.657	154.762
34	10	Johnny Benson Jr.	Tyler Jet Motorsports	Pontiac	23.674	154.651
35	26	Jimmy Spencer	Haas-Carter Motorsports	Ford	23.684	154.585
36	36	Ken Schrader	MB2 Motorsports	Pontiac	23.691	154.540
Provisionals
37	4	Bobby Hamilton	Morgan–McClure Motorsports	Chevrolet	—	—
38	97	Chad Little	Roush Racing	Ford	—	—
39	60	Ted Musgrave	Joe Bessey Racing	Chevrolet	—	—
40	75	Wally Dallenbach Jr.	Galaxy Motorsports	Ford	—	—
41	77	Robert Pressley	Jasper Motorsports	Ford	—	—
42	71	Dave Marcis	Marcis Auto Racing	Chevrolet	—	—
43	90	Ed Berrier	Donlavey Racing	Ford	—	—
Failed to qualify
44	50	Ricky Craven	Midwest Transit Racing	Chevrolet	23.733	154.266
45	32	Scott Pruett (R)	PPI Motorsports	Ford	23.848	153.522
46	93	Dave Blaney (R)	Bill Davis Racing	Pontiac	23.765	154.058
47	14	Mike Bliss (R)	A. J. Foyt Racing	Pontiac	23.855	153.477
Official qualifying results

== Race results ==
Fin	St	#	Driver	Team	Make	Laps	Led	Status	Pts
1	3	18	Bobby Labonte	Joe Gibbs Racing	Pontiac	393	134	Running	185
2	4	3	Dale Earnhardt	Richard Childress Racing	Chevrolet	393	1	Running	175
3	11	22	Ward Burton	Bill Davis Racing	Pontiac	393	100	Running	170
4	15	20	Tony Stewart	Joe Gibbs Racing	Pontiac	393	0	Running	160
5	23	88	Dale Jarrett	Robert Yates Racing	Ford	392	0	Running	155
6	2	28	Ricky Rudd	Robert Yates Racing	Ford	392	0	Running	150
7	27	12	Jeremy Mayfield	Penske-Kranefuss Racing	Ford	392	0	Running	146
8	33	6	Mark Martin	Roush Racing	Ford	392	26	Running	147
9	18	1	Steve Park	Dale Earnhardt, Inc.	Chevrolet	392	34	Running	143
10	5	24	Jeff Gordon	Hendrick Motorsports	Chevrolet	392	16	Running	139
11	1	2	Rusty Wallace	Penske-Kranefuss Racing	Ford	391	37	Running	135
12	20	43	John Andretti	Petty Enterprises	Pontiac	391	0	Running	127
13	36	36	Ken Schrader	MB2 Motorsports	Pontiac	391	0	Running	124
14	34	10	Johnny Benson Jr.	Tyler Jet Motorsports	Pontiac	391	0	Running	121
15	14	40	Sterling Marlin	Team SABCO	Chevrolet	391	2	Running	123
16	39	60	Ted Musgrave	Joe Bessey Racing	Chevrolet	390	0	Running	115
17	17	5	Terry Labonte	Hendrick Motorsports	Chevrolet	390	0	Running	112
18	38	97	Chad Little	Roush Racing	Ford	390	0	Running	109
19	7	8	Dale Earnhardt Jr. (R)	Dale Earnhardt, Inc.	Chevrolet	390	0	Running	106
20	40	75	Wally Dallenbach Jr.	Galaxy Motorsports	Ford	390	0	Running	103
21	12	31	Mike Skinner	Richard Childress Racing	Chevrolet	390	0	Running	100
22	31	42	Kenny Irwin Jr.	Team SABCO	Chevrolet	389	0	Running	97
23	24	7	Michael Waltrip	Mattei Motorsports	Chevrolet	389	0	Running	94
24	19	55	Kenny Wallace	Andy Petree Racing	Chevrolet	389	0	Running	91
25	9	94	Bill Elliott	Bill Elliott Racing	Ford	389	0	Running	88
26	35	26	Jimmy Spencer	Haas-Carter Motorsports	Ford	389	0	Running	85
27	28	16	Kevin Lepage	Roush Racing	Ford	389	0	Running	82
28	26	21	Elliott Sadler	Wood Brothers Racing	Ford	389	0	Running	79
29	22	25	Jerry Nadeau	Hendrick Motorsports	Chevrolet	388	0	Running	76
30	8	33	Joe Nemechek	Andy Petree Racing	Chevrolet	388	0	Running	73
31	13	44	Kyle Petty	Petty Enterprises	Pontiac	388	0	Running	70
32	16	99	Jeff Burton	Roush Racing	Ford	387	1	Running	72
33	29	41	Rick Mast	Larry Hedrick Motorsports	Chevrolet	387	0	Running	64
34	21	9	Stacy Compton (R)	Melling Racing	Ford	386	0	Running	61
35	32	11	Brett Bodine	Brett Bodine Racing	Ford	385	0	Running	58
36	43	90	Ed Berrier	Donlavey Racing	Ford	384	0	Running	55
37	6	17	Matt Kenseth (R)	Roush Racing	Ford	383	0	Running	52
38	25	13	Robby Gordon	Team Menard	Ford	381	0	Running	49
39	10	66	Darrell Waltrip	Haas-Carter Motorsports	Ford	379	0	Running	46
40	37	4	Bobby Hamilton	Morgan–McClure Motorsports	Chevrolet	368	42	Running	48
41	42	71	Dave Marcis	Marcis Auto Racing	Chevrolet	363	0	Running	40
42	30	27	Jeff Fuller (R)	Eel River Racing	Pontiac	336	0	Running	37
43	41	77	Robert Pressley	Jasper Motorsports	Ford	222	0	Ignition	34
Official race results

Previous race: 2000 Daytona 500	NASCAR Winston Cup Series; 2000 season	Next race: 2000 CarsDirect.com 400
