= 2002 Channellock 250 =

Race details
- Race 5 of 34 of the 2002 NASCAR Busch Series
- Map of Speedway
- Date: March 23, 2002
- Official name: 2002 Channellock 250
- Location: Bristol Motor Speedway in Bristol, Tennessee
- Course: Short track
- Course length: 0.533 miles (0.858 km)
- Distance: 250 laps, 133.250 mi (214.445 km)
- Weather: Clear
- Average speed: 66.093 mph (106.366 km/h)

Pole position
Driver	Scott Riggs	ppc Racing
- Time: 15.196

Most laps led
Driver	Jeff Green	Richard Childress Racing
- Laps: 187

Winner
No. 21	Jeff Green	Richard Childress Racing

Television in the United States
- Network: FX
- Announcers: Mike Joy, Larry McReynolds, Darrell Waltrip

The 2002 Channellock 250 was a NASCAR Busch Series race held at Bristol Motor Speedway in Bristol, Tennessee on March 23, 2002. The race was the 20th iteration of the event and the 5th race of the 2002 NASCAR Busch Series. Rookie Scott Riggs won the pole for the race but it was 2000 Series champion Jeff Green who would dominate the race leading the most laps and winning the race. But the race became a wreckfest and was remembered for a pair conflicts between multiple drivers including the ongoing feud between rookies Shane Hmiel and Casey Mears. The conflicts would eventually go to the post-race where there were two different conflicts with one being between Jack Sprague and Jimmy Spencer and the other being the most memorable between Kevin Harvick and Greg Biffle.

== Background ==
The Bristol Motor Speedway, formerly known as Bristol International Raceway and Bristol Raceway, is a NASCAR short track venue located in Bristol, Tennessee. Constructed in 1960, it held its first NASCAR race on July 30, 1961. Despite its short length, Bristol is among the most popular tracks on the NASCAR schedule because of its distinct features, which include extraordinarily steep banking, an all concrete surface, two pit roads, and stadium-like seating. It has also been named one of the loudest NASCAR tracks.

=== Entry list ===
- (R) denotes rookie driver

#	Driver	Team	Make
1	Jimmy Spencer	Phoenix Racing	Chevrolet
2	Johnny Sauter (R)	Richard Childress Racing	Chevrolet
5	Ron Hornaday Jr.	Hendrick Motorsports	Chevrolet
7	Randy LaJoie	Evans Motorsports	Chevrolet
10	Scott Riggs (R)	ppc Racing	Ford
12	Kerry Earnhardt (R)	FitzBradshaw Racing	Chevrolet
14	Larry Foyt	Foyt Racing	Chevrolet
16	Chad Chaffin	Day Enterprise Racing	Pontiac
18	Mike McLaughlin	Joe Gibbs Racing	Pontiac
19	Tim Sauter	AP Performance Racing	Chevrolet
21	Jeff Green	Richard Childress Racing	Chevrolet
23	Scott Wimmer	Bill Davis Racing	Pontiac
24	Jack Sprague	Hendrick Motorsports	Chevrolet
25	Bobby Hamilton Jr.	Team Rensi Motorsports	Ford
26	Lyndon Amick	Carroll Racing	Chevrolet
27	Jamie McMurray	Brewco Motorsports	Chevrolet
28	Brad Baker	Baker Racing	Chevrolet
29	Kevin Harvick	Richard Childress Racing	Chevrolet
33	Tony Raines	BACE Motorsports	Chevrolet
36	Hank Parker Jr.	Welliver-Jesel Motorsports	Dodge
37	Jeff Purvis	Brewco Motorsports	Chevrolet
38	Mark Green	Akins Motorsports	Ford
40	Brian Vickers (R)	BLV Motorsports	Dodge
44	Mike Harmon	GIC-Mixon Motorsports	Chevrolet
46	Ashton Lewis	Lewis Motorsports	Chevrolet
47	Shane Hmiel (R)	Innovative Motorsports	Chevrolet
48	Kenny Wallace	Innovative Motorsports	Chevrolet
49	Joe Buford	Jay Robinson Racing	Ford
52	Brad Teague	Means Racing	Ford
54	Kevin Grubb	Team Bristol Motorsports	Chevrolet
57	Jason Keller	ppc Racing	Ford
59	Stacy Compton	ST Motorsports	Chevrolet
60	Greg Biffle	Roush Racing	Ford
63	Ken Alexander	Ken Alexander Racing	Chevrolet
66	Casey Mears (R)	Welliver-Jesel Motorsports	Dodge
71	Kevin Lepage	Matrix Motorsports	Ford
75	Butch Miller	Henderson Motorsports	Chevrolet
77	Andy Kirby	Moy Racing	Ford
84	Brian Weber	Weber Racing	Chevrolet
92	Todd Bodine	Herzog-Jackson Motorsports	Chevrolet
94	Derrike Cope	DF2 Motorsports	Chevrolet
98	Kasey Kahne (R)	Robert Yates Racing	Ford
99	Michael Waltrip	Michael Waltrip Racing	Chevrolet
Official Entry list

== Qualifying ==
Rookie Scott Riggs won the pole for the race with a time of 15.196 and a speed of 126.270.

Grid	No.	Driver	Team	Manufacturer	Time	Speed
1	10	Scott Riggs (R)	ppc Racing	Ford	15.196	126.270
2	21	Jeff Green	Richard Childress Racing	Chevrolet	15.255	125.773
3	57	Jason Keller	ppc Racing	Ford	15.295	125.452
4	1	Jimmy Spencer	Phoenix Racing	Chevrolet	15.350	125.003
5	59	Stacy Compton	ST Motorsports	Chevrolet	15.408	124.532
6	48	Kenny Wallace	Innovative Motorsports	Chevrolet	15.420	124.427
7	99	Michael Waltrip	Michael Waltrip Racing	Chevrolet	15.427	124.379
8	46	Ashton Lewis	Lewis Motorsports	Chevrolet	15.430	124.355
9	25	Bobby Hamilton Jr.	Team Rensi Motorsports	Ford	15.435	124.314
10	18	Mike McLaughlin	Joe Gibbs Racing	Pontiac	15.508	123.721
11	5	Ron Hornaday	Hendrick Motorsports	Chevrolet	15.522	123.618
12	29	Kevin Harvick	Richard Childress Racing	Chevrolet	15.524	123.602
13	2	Johnny Sauter (R)	Richard Childress Racing	Chevrolet	15.533	123.530
14	40	Brian Vickers (R)	BLV Motorsports	Dodge	15.541	123.458
15	54	Kevin Grubb	Team Bristol Motorsports	Chevrolet	15.550	123.387
16	71	Kevin Lepage	Matrix Motorsports	Ford	15.552	123.379
17	23	Scott Wimmer	Bill Davis Racing	Pontiac	15.555	123.347
18	60	Greg Biffle	Roush Racing	Ford	15.557	123.332
19	14	Larry Foyt	Foyt Racing	Chevrolet	15.562	123.292
20	47	Shane Hmiel (R)	Innovative Motorsports	Chevrolet	15.564	123.284
21	7	Randy LaJoie	Evans Motorsports	Chevrolet	15.569	123.244
22	92	Todd Bodine	Herzog-Jackson Motorsports	Chevrolet	15.593	123.047
23	37	Jeff Purvis	Brewco Motorsports	Chevrolet	15.595	123.031
24	77	Andy Kirby	Moy Racing	Ford	15.607	122.944
25	38	Mark Green	Akins Motorsports	Ford	15.619	122.842
26	27	Jamie McMurray	Brewco Motorsports	Chevrolet	15.621	122.826
27	66	Casey Mears (R)	Welliver-Jesel Motorsports	Dodge	15.645	122.646
28	98	Kasey Kahne (R)	Robert Yates Racing	Ford	15.651	122.599
29	26	Lyndon Amick	Carroll Racing	Chevrolet	15.659	122.528
30	36	Hank Parker Jr.	Welliver-Jesel Motorsports	Dodge	15.671	122.434
31	24	Jack Sprague	Hendrick Motorsports	Chevrolet	15.750	121.828
32	94	Derrike Cope	DF2 Motorsports	Chevrolet	15.753	121.797
33	19	Tim Sauter	AP Performance Racing	Chevrolet	15.793	121.489
34	12	Kerry Earnhardt (R)	FitzBradshaw Racing	Chevrolet	15.795	121.481
35	52	Brad Teague	Means Racing	Ford	15.810	121.366
36	28	Brad Baker	Baker Racing	Chevrolet	15.842	121.121
37	33	Tony Raines	BACE Motorsports	Chevrolet	15.880	120.831
38	63	Ken Alexander	Ken Alexander Racing	Chevrolet	16.374	117.185
39	49	Joe Buford	Jay Robinson Racing	Ford	15.974	120.120
40	16	Chad Chaffin	Day Enterprise Racing	Pontiac	15.871	120.899
41	44	Mike Harmon	GIC-Mixon Motorsports	Chevrolet	16.620	115.451
42	75	Butch Miller	Henderson Motorsports	Chevrolet	15.996	119.955
43	84	Brian Weber	Weber Racing	Chevrolet	16.381	117.128
Official Starting grid

== Race results ==
Pos	Car	Driver	Team	Manufacturer	Laps Run	Laps Led	Status	Points
1	21	Jeff Green	Richard Childress Racing	Chevrolet	250	187	running	185
2	18	Mike McLaughlin	Joe Gibbs Racing	Pontiac	250	49	running	175
3	23	Scott Wimmer	Bill Davis Racing	Pontiac	250	0	running	165
4	1	Jimmy Spencer	Phoenix Racing	Chevrolet	250	7	running	165
5	60	Greg Biffle	Roush Racing	Ford	250	0	running	155
6	48	Kenny Wallace	Innovative Motorsports	Chevrolet	250	0	running	150
7	7	Randy LaJoie	Evans Motorsports	Chevrolet	250	0	running	146
8	92	Todd Bodine	Herzog-Jackson Motorsports	Chevrolet	250	0	running	142
9	10	Scott Riggs	ppc Racing	Ford	250	5	running	143
10	47	Shane Hmiel (R)	Innovative Motorsports	Chevrolet	250	0	running	134
11	33	Tony Raines	BACE Motorsports	Chevrolet	250	0	running	130
12	54	Kevin Grubb	Team Bristol Motorsports	Chevrolet	250	0	running	127
13	25	Bobby Hamilton Jr.	Team Rensi Motorsports	Ford	250	0	running	124
14	40	Brian Vickers (R)	BLV Motorsports	Dodge	250	0	running	121
15	75	Butch Miller	Henderson Motorsports	Chevrolet	249	0	running	118
16	19	Tim Sauter	AP Performance Motorsports	Chevrolet	249	0	running	115
17	38	Mark Green	Akins Motorsports	Ford	248	0	running	112
18	46	Ashton Lewis	Lewis Motorsports	Chevrolet	248	0	running	109
19	24	Jack Sprague	Hendrick Motorsports	Chevrolet	245	0	running	106
20	14	Larry Foyt	Foyt Racing	Chevrolet	244	0	running	103
21	94	Derrike Cope	DF2 Motorsports	Chevrolet	243	0	running	100
22	26	Lyndon Amick	Carroll Racing	Ford	242	0	running	97
23	66	Casey Mears (R)	Welliver-Jesel Motorsports	Dodge	239	0	running	94
24	29	Kevin Harvick	Richard Childress Racing	Chevrolet	238	2	crash	96
25	84	Brian Weber	Weber Racing	Chevrolet	238	0	running	88
26	27	Jamie McMurray	Brewco Motorsports	Chevrolet	237	0	running	85
27	37	Jeff Purvis	Brewco Motorsports	Chevrolet	234	0	electrical	82
28	12	Kerry Earnhardt (R)	FitzBradshaw Racing	Chevrolet	233	0	running	79
29	57	Jason Keller	ppc Racing	Ford	226	0	running	76
30	99	Michael Waltrip	Michael Waltrip Racing	Chevrolet	222	0	running	73
31	63	Ken Alexander	Ken Alexander Racing	Chevrolet	220	0	crash	70
32	98	Kasey Kahne (R)	Robert Yates Racing	Ford	220	0	running	67
33	36	Hank Parker Jr.	Welliver-Jesel Racing	Dodge	210	0	running	64
34	71	Kevin Lepage	Matrix Motorsports	Ford	208	0	running	61
35	2	Johnny Sauter (R)	Richard Childress Racing	Chevrolet	207	0	crash	58
36	59	Stacy Compton	ST Motorsports	Chevrolet	207	0	running	55
37	49	Joe Buford	Jay Robinson Racing	Ford	187	0	crash	52
38	5	Ron Hornaday	Hendrick Motorsports	Chevrolet	144	0	rear end	49
39	77	Andy Kirby	Moy Racing	Ford	130	0	crash	46
40	16	Chad Chaffin	Day Enterprise Racing	Pontiac	95	0	engine	43
41	28	Brad Baker	Baker Racing	Chevrolet	52	0	engine	40
42	44	Mike Harmon	GIC-Mixon Motorsports	Chevrolet	33	0	electrical	37
43	52	Brad Teague	Means Racing	Ford	17	0	engine	34
Official Race results

Previous race: 2002 darlingtonraceway.com 200	NASCAR Busch Series; 2002 season	Next race: 2002 O'Reilly 300
