= 1999 NASCAR Busch Series =

American motorsport season

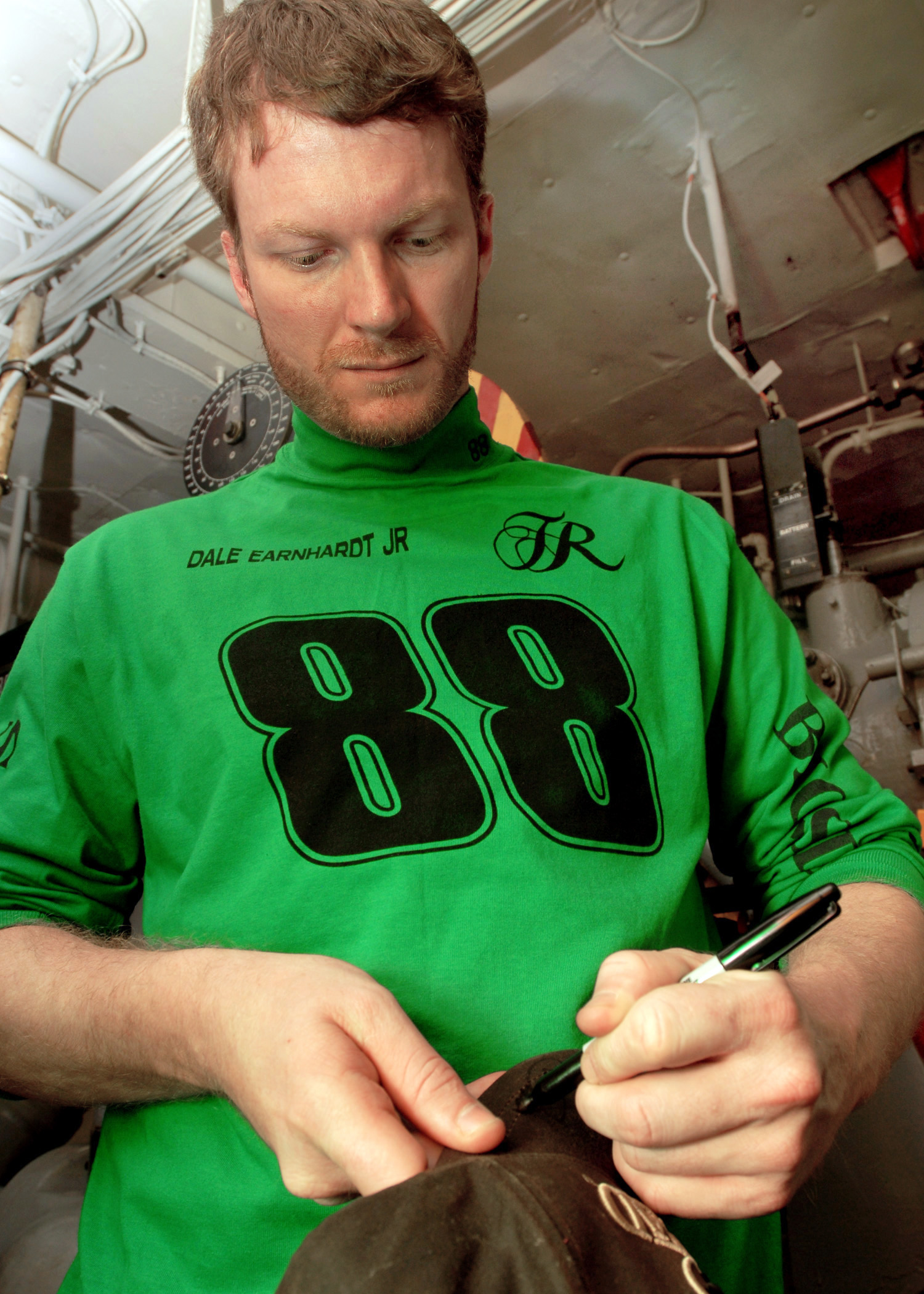
Dale Earnhardt Jr., the 1999 Busch Series champion

The 1999 NASCAR Busch Series began on February 13 and ended on November 13. Dale Earnhardt Jr. of Dale Earnhardt, Inc. won the season points championship for the second year in a row.

== Teams and drivers ==
=== Complete schedule ===
Team	Manufacturer	No.	Driver(s)	Listed owner(s)	Crew chief
Akins-Sutton Motorsports	Ford Taurus	38	Glenn Allen Jr.	Brad Akins	Dean Johnson
Akins-Sutton Motorsports	Ford Taurus	98	Elton Sawyer	Brad Akins	Ricky Viers
AllCar Racing	Chevrolet Monte Carlo	22	Jimmy Kitchens	Dave Carroll	Todd Lohse
BACE Motorsports	Chevrolet Monte Carlo	33	Jason Jarrett	Barbara Baumgardner	Gary Cogswell
BACE Motorsports	Chevrolet Monte Carlo	74	Tony Raines (R)	Bill Baumgardner	Steve Bird
Bill Davis Racing	Pontiac Grand Prix	93	Dave Blaney 31	Gail Davis	Gil Martin
Bill Davis Racing	Pontiac Grand Prix	93	Tom Hubert 1	Gail Davis	Gil Martin
Brewco Motorsports J&J Racing	Chevrolet Monte Carlo	27	Casey Atwood	Tammy Brewer	Jason Ratcliff
Brewco Motorsports J&J Racing	Chevrolet Monte Carlo	37	Kevin Grubb	Clarence Brewer	Terry Shirley
Brewco Motorsports J&J Racing	Chevrolet Monte Carlo	99	Kevin Lepage	Bill Papke	Dan Gibbs
Buckshot Racing	Pontiac Grand Prix	00	Larry Pearson	Billy Jones	Kenneth Campbell
Cicci-Welliver Racing	Chevrolet Monte Carlo	34	Mike McLaughlin	Frank Cicci	Jay Smith
Cicci-Welliver Racing	Pontiac Grand Prix	36	Tim Fedewa	Scott Welliver	Vic Kangas
Cicci-Welliver Racing	Chevrolet Monte Carlo	66	Todd Bodine	Jeffrey Welliver	Donnie Richeson
Curb/Agajanian Motorsports	Chevrolet Monte Carlo	43	Shane Hall	Don Stegall	Gene Nead
Dale Earnhardt, Inc.	Chevrolet Monte Carlo	3	Dale Earnhardt Jr.	Dale Earnhardt	Tony Eury Sr.
Diamond Ridge Motorsports	Chevrolet Monte Carlo	4	Jeff Purvis	Gary Bechtel	Johnny Allen
Excel Motorsports	Chevrolet Monte Carlo	56	Jeff Krogh	Molly Krogh	Sammy Speaks
Excel Motorsports	Chevrolet Monte Carlo	80	Mark Krogh	Robert Krogh	Doug George
Galaxy Motorsports	Chevrolet Monte Carlo	40	Kerry Earnhardt (R)	Doug Taylor	Richard Lasater
Grubb Motorsports	Chevrolet Monte Carlo	83	Wayne Grubb	William Grubb	Bobby King
GTS Motorsports	Chevrolet Monte Carlo	90	Brad Loney	Frederick Maggio	Bob Johnson
Hank Parker Racing	Chevrolet Monte Carlo	53	Hank Parker Jr. (R)	Hank Parker	Dave McCarty
Henderson Brothers Racing	Chevrolet Monte Carlo	75	Kelly Denton (R)	Charlie Henderson	Ron Denton
Hillin Racing	Chevrolet Monte Carlo	8	Bobby Hillin	Robert Hayes	Steve Hibbard
HVP Motorsports	Chevrolet Monte Carlo	63	Chuck Bown	Hubert Hensley	Jeff Hensley
Innovative Motorsports	Chevrolet Monte Carlo	47	Andy Santerre	George DeBidart	Kevin Caldwell
Labonte Motorsports	Chevrolet Monte Carlo	44	Terry Labonte	Kimberly Labonte	Eddie Lowery
Labonte Motorsports	Chevrolet Monte Carlo	44	Justin Labonte	Kimberly Labonte	Eddie Lowery
NorthStar Motorsports	Chevrolet Monte Carlo	89	Jeff Fuller	Meredith Ruark	Leon Fox
Parker Racing	Chevrolet Monte Carlo	72	Hermie Sadler	Ron Parker	Cal Northrup
Petty Enterprises	Chevrolet Monte Carlo	45	Adam Petty (R)	Kyle Petty	Lance Deiters
PRW Racing	Ford Taurus	77	Ed Berrier	Tony Hall	Jimmy Means
Phil Parsons Racing	Chevrolet Monte Carlo	10	Phil Parsons	Marcia Parsons	Doug Taylor
Phoenix Racing	Chevrolet Monte Carlo	1	Randy LaJoie	James Finch	Marc Reno
Progressive Motorsports	Chevrolet Monte Carlo	32	Jeff Green	Greg Pollex	Harold Holly
Progressive Motorsports	Chevrolet Monte Carlo	57	Jason Keller	Steve DeSouza	Steve Addington
Reiser Enterprises	Chevrolet Monte Carlo	17	Matt Kenseth	Robbie Reiser	Robbie Reiser
Roush Racing	Ford Taurus	9	Jeff Burton	Jack Roush	Tommy Morgan
Roush Racing	Ford Taurus	60	Mark Martin	Jack Roush	Tony Lambert
Sadler Brothers Racing	Chevrolet Monte Carlo	95	Bobby Hamilton Jr. (R)	Earl Sadler	Chick Sadler
Spencer Motor Ventures	Chevrolet Monte Carlo	5	Dick Trickle	Jimmy Spencer	Bryan Schaffer
Spencer Motor Ventures	Chevrolet Monte Carlo	12	Jimmy Spencer	Jimmy Spencer	N/A
ST Motorsports	Chevrolet Monte Carlo	59	Mike Dillon	Tad Geschickter	Steve Plattenberger
Team Amick	Chevrolet Monte Carlo	35	Lyndon Amick 2	Bill Amick	Buddy Barnes 20; Brad Pickens 2 Sandy Jones 8
Team Amick	Chevrolet Monte Carlo	35	Mike Bliss 2	Bill Amick	Buddy Barnes 20; Brad Pickens 2 Sandy Jones 8
Team Amick	Chevrolet Monte Carlo	35	Elliott Sadler 6	Bill Amick	Buddy Barnes 20; Brad Pickens 2 Sandy Jones 8
Team Rensi Motorsports	Chevrolet Monte Carlo	25	Jeff Finley	Ed Rensi	David Ifft
Team Rensi Motorsports	Chevrolet Monte Carlo	25	Kenny Wallace	Ed Rensi	David Ifft
Team Yellow Racing	Chevrolet Monte Carlo	19	Mike Skinner	David Ridling	C. R. Miller
Washington-Erving Motorsports	Chevrolet Monte Carlo	50	Mark Green	Joe Washington	Darrell Bryant
Xpress Motorsports	Pontiac Grand Prix	61	Derrike Cope	Steve Coulter	Dave Fuge

=== Limited schedule ===
Manufacturer	Team	No.	Race driver	Crew chief	Round(s)
Chevrolet	Team Amick	88	Lyndon Amick		1
Chevrolet	Team Amick	88	Jeff Fuller		1
Chevrolet	Andy Petree Racing	15	Ken Schrader	Andy Petree	14
Chevrolet	Andy Petree Racing	15	Mario Gosselin	Andy Petree	1
Chevrolet	Andy Petree Racing	15	Derrick Gilchrist	Andy Petree	2
Chevrolet	Andy Petree Racing	15	Tom Hubert	Andy Petree	1
Chevrolet	Blaise Alexander Racing	20	Blaise Alexander		2
Chevrolet	Blue Ridge Motorsports	01	Philip Morris	Neil Perkins	10
Chevrolet	Dale Earnhardt Incorporated	31	Ron Hornaday Jr.		3
Chevrolet	Gordon–Evernham Motorsports	24	Jeff Gordon	Patrick Donahue	6
Chevrolet	Gordon–Evernham Motorsports	24	Ricky Hendrick	Patrick Donahue	4
Chevrolet	Joe Bessey Motorsports	6	Joe Bessey		7
Chevrolet	Michael Waltrip Racing	21	Michael Waltrip	Tommy Byrd	16
Chevrolet	Michael Waltrip Racing	21	Mike Bliss	Tommy Byrd	1
Chevrolet	NEMCO Motorsports	87	Joe Nemechek		14
Chevrolet	NEMCO Motorsports	87	Ron Fellows		1
Chevrolet	Richard Childress Racing	2	Kevin Harvick		2
Chevrolet	Sterling Marlin Racing	14	Sterling Marlin		7
Chevrolet	Sterling Marlin Racing	14	Blaise Alexander		1
Chevrolet	Golden Gate Racing Team	14	Steve Portenga		1
Chevrolet	Team SABCO	14	Jimmy Morales		1
Chevrolet	Team SABCO	82	Jimmy Morales		2
Chevrolet	Team SABCO	82	Dave Steele		1
Chevrolet	Team Yellow Racing	19	Mike Skinner	C.R. Miller	14
Chevrolet	Team Yellow Racing	19	Jamie Skinner	C.R. Miller	3
Chevrolet	Team Yellow Racing	19	Stacy Compton	C.R. Miller	1
Chevrolet	Team Yellow Racing	19	Ted Smokstad	C.R. Miller	2
Chevrolet	Team Yellow Racing	19	Greg Biffle	C.R. Miller	1
Ford	Roush Racing	9	Jeff Burton		14
Ford	Roush Racing	60	Mark Martin		15
Ford	Jarrett/Favre Motorsports	11	Kenny Irwin Jr.	Wes Ward	10
Ford	Jarrett/Favre Motorsports	11	Dennis Setzer	Wes Ward	1
Ford	Jarrett/Favre Motorsports	11	Jason Jarrett	Wes Ward	1
Ford	Jarrett/Favre Motorsports	11	Dale Jarrett	Wes Ward	1
Ford	Jarrett/Favre Motorsports	11	Steve Grissom	Wes Ward	4
Ford	Wings Racing	58	Mario Gosselin		3
Pontiac	Bill Davis Racing	02	Ward Burton		6
Pontiac	Day Enterprise Racing	16	Mark Day		4
Pontiac	Joe Gibbs Racing	18	Andy Hillenburg	Bryant Frazier	1
Pontiac	Joe Gibbs Racing	18	J. D. Gibbs	Bryant Frazier	4
Pontiac	Joe Gibbs Racing	18	Bobby Labonte	Bryant Frazier	2
Pontiac	Joe Gibbs Racing	18	Steve Grissom	Bryant Frazier	1
Pontiac	Joe Gibbs Racing	18	Jason Leffler	Bryant Frazier	5
Pontiac	Joe Gibbs Racing	42	Sterling Marlin	Gordon Gibbs	3
Pontiac	Joe Gibbs Racing	42	Jeff Fuller	Gordon Gibbs	4
Pontiac	Joe Gibbs Racing	42	J.D. Gibbs	Gordon Gibbs	1

== Races ==
=== NAPA Auto Parts 300 ===
The NAPA Auto Parts 300 was held February 13 at Daytona International Speedway. Ken Schrader was the polesitter. The race was broadcast on CBS.

Top ten results

1. #1 - Randy LaJoie
2. #32 - Jeff Green
3. #18 - Andy Hillenburg
4. #17 - Matt Kenseth
5. #8 - Bobby Hillin Jr.
6. #45 - Adam Petty
7. #99 - Kevin Lepage
8. #37 - Kevin Grubb
9. #9 - Jeff Burton
10. #90 - Brad Loney

Failed to qualify: Hank Parker Jr. (#53), Derrike Cope (#61), Kelly Denton (#75), Morgan Shepherd (#07), Wayne Grubb (#83), Jeff Krogh (#56), Mike Garvey (#09), Skip Smith (#67), Shane Hall (#43), Mark Krogh (#80), Mike Stefanik (#05), Mark Day (#16), Blaise Alexander (#20), Ed Berrier (#77), Hermie Sadler (#72), Freddie Query (#68), Jeff McClure (#13), Brett Bodine (#54), Jim Bown (#51), Joe Bessey (#6), Lance Hooper (#23), Loy Allen Jr. (#78)-Withdrew

- Coming to the white flag, Casey Atwood was turned into the outside retaining wall by Andy Hillenburg before getting airborne and rolling onto his roof. The car slid across the tri-oval upside-down, before hitting the grass and flipping four more times. Atwood emerged from his car unscathed.
- Andy Santerre suffered a broken leg in a multi-car crash on lap 26, sidelining him until Dover in June.

=== Alltel 200 ===
The Alltel 200 was held February 20 at North Carolina Speedway. Qualifying was rained out, so the field was set by the final point standings from 1998. Dale Earnhardt Jr. was the polesitter. The race was broadcast on TNN.

Top ten results

1. #9 - Jeff Burton
2. #60 - Mark Martin
3. #17 - Matt Kenseth
4. #1 - Randy LaJoie
5. #27 - Casey Atwood
6. #34 - Mike McLaughlin
7. #98 - Elton Sawyer
8. #64 - Geoff Bodine
9. #66 - Todd Bodine
10. #36 - Tim Fedewa

Failed to qualify: Adam Petty (#45), Freddie Query (#68), Brad Loney (#90), David Green (#41), Glenn Allen Jr. (#38), Philip Morris (#01), Jeff Green (#32), Mario Gosselin (#58), Dick Trickle (#5), Jeff Finley (#25), Bryan Wall (#73), Mike Skinner (#19), Bobby Labonte (#44), Jimmy Kitchens (#22)

=== Sam's Town 300 ===
The Sam's Town 300 was held March 6 at Las Vegas Motor Speedway. Mark Martin was the pole sitter. The race was broadcast on ESPN.

Top ten results

1. #60 - Mark Martin
2. #87 - Joe Nemechek
3. #9 - Jeff Burton
4. #24 - Jeff Gordon
5. #12 - Jimmy Spencer
6. #3 - Dale Earnhardt Jr.
7. #47 - Elliott Sadler
8. #32 - Jeff Green
9. #99 - Kevin Lepage
10. #57 - Jason Keller

Failed to qualify: Casey Atwood (#27), Glenn Allen Jr. (#38), Brad Loney (#90), Mike Dillon (#59), Ted Musgrave (#29), Joe Buford (#7), Larry Pearson (#00), Jeff Finley (#25), Shane Hall (#43), Ed Berrier (#77), Jimmy Kitchens (#22), Kevin Grubb (#37), Freddie Query (#68), Wayne Grubb (#83), Bobby Hillin Jr. (#8), Bryan Wall (#73), Hermie Sadler (#72), Eric Jones (#70), Morgan Shepherd (#07), Mark Krogh (#80), Jerry Glanville (#81), Bobby Hamilton Jr. (#95)

=== Yellow Freight 300 ===
The Yellow Freight 300 was held March 13 at Atlanta Motor Speedway. Dave Blaney was the polesitter. The race was broadcast on ESPN.

Top ten results

1. #19 - Mike Skinner*
2. #93 - Dave Blaney
3. #3 - Dale Earnhardt Jr.
4. #99 - Kevin Lepage
5. #66 - Todd Bodine
6. #60 - Mark Martin
7. #64 - Geoff Bodine
8. #98 - Elton Sawyer
9. #38 - Glenn Allen Jr.
10. #50 - Mark Green

Failed to qualify: Andy Kirby (#28), Tim Fedewa (#36), Freddie Query (#68), Hermie Sadler (#72), Bobby Hamilton Jr. (#95), Jeff Finley (#25), Shane Hall (#43), Brad Loney (#90), Jeff Fuller (#89), J. D. Gibbs (#18), Kevin Grubb (#37), Mark Day (#16)

- The race came under controversy when winner Mike Skinner was disqualified and the win was given to Blaney. But after a further review, NASCAR reversed its decision and re-awarded the victory to Skinner.
- Dick Trickle and Wayne Grubb were injured in a multi-car crash on lap 135.

=== Diamond Hill Plywood 200 ===
The Diamond Hill Plywood 200 was held March 20 at Darlington Raceway. Mark Martin was the polesitter. The race was broadcast on ESPN.

Top ten results

1. #17 - Matt Kenseth
2. #98 - Elton Sawyer
3. #10 - Phil Parsons
4. #44 - Terry Labonte
5. #99 - Kevin Lepage
6. #9 - Jeff Burton
7. #41 - David Green
8. #36 - Tim Fedewa
9. #21 - Michael Waltrip
10. #66 - Todd Bodine

Failed to qualify: Jim Bown (#51), Kevin Grubb (#37)*, Lyndon Amick (#35), Andy Kirby (#28), Jeff Finley (#25), Freddie Query (#68), Mark Krogh (#80), Kerry Earnhardt (#40), Jimmy Kitchens (#22), Bobby Labonte (#18)

- Kevin Grubb replaced Joe Nemechek in the #83 car in the race, after failing to qualify his #37.

=== Coca-Cola 300 ===
The Coca-Cola 300 was held March 27 at Texas Motor Speedway. Dave Blaney won the pole. The race was shortened to 163 laps due to rain. The race was broadcast on CBS and switched to TNN midway through the race.

Top ten results

1. #60 - Mark Martin
2. #9 - Jeff Burton
3. #32 - Jeff Green
4. #34 - Mike McLaughlin
5. #11 - Kenny Irwin Jr.
6. #57 - Jason Keller
7. #15 - Ken Schrader
8. #93 - Dave Blaney
9. #19 - Mike Skinner
10. #3 - Dale Earnhardt Jr.

Failed to qualify: Ed Berrier (#77), Andy Kirby (#28), Sterling Marlin (#42), Dick Trickle (#5), Jimmy Spencer (#12), Philip Morris (#01), Steve Park (#83), Shane Hall (#43), Stanton Barrett (#40), Brad Loney (#90), Jason Jarrett (#33), Steve Grissom (#18)*, Jimmy Kitchens (#22), Mark Day (#16), Joe Buford (#7), Kenny Wallace (#25), Mark Krogh (#80), Bobby Hamilton Jr. (#95)

- Steve Grissom replaced Tony Raines in the #74 car in the race after Raines suffer a concussion in a practice crash, Grissom originally failed to qualify his #18.

=== BellSouth Mobility 320 ===
The BellSouth Mobility 320 was held April 3 at Nashville Speedway USA. Dale Earnhardt Jr. won the pole. The race was broadcast on CBS.

Top ten results

1. #32 - Jeff Green
2. #27 - Casey Atwood
3. #57 - Jason Keller
4. #87 - Joe Nemechek
5. #66 - Todd Bodine
6. #4 - Jeff Purvis
7. #34 - Mike McLaughlin
8. #98 - Elton Sawyer
9. #3 - Dale Earnhardt Jr.
10. #10 - Phil Parsons

Failed to qualify: J. D. Gibbs (#18), Freddie Query (#68), Scot Walters (#83), Lyndon Amick (#35), Shane Hall (#43), Brad Baker (#7), Chad Chaffin (#84), Donnie Moran (#58), Mark Day (#16), Bobby Hamilton Jr. (#95), Chris Cook (#65)

=== Moore's Snacks 250 ===
The Moore's Snacks 250 was held April 10 at Bristol Motor Speedway. Jason Keller won the pole. The race was broadcast on ESPN.

Top ten results

1. #57 - Jason Keller
2. #3 - Dale Earnhardt Jr.
3. #98 - Elton Sawyer
4. #44 - Terry Labonte
5. #66 - Todd Bodine
6. #25 - Kenny Wallace
7. #37 - Kevin Grubb
8. #14 - Sterling Marlin
9. #36 - Tim Fedewa
10. #61 - Tony Roper

Failed to qualify: Ted Christopher (#13), Freddie Query (#68), Gary Bradberry (#86), Jason Jarrett (#33), Hermie Sadler (#72), Kelly Denton (#75), Curtis Markham (#83), Elliott Sadler (#47)

=== Touchstone Energy 300 ===
The Touchstone Energy 300 was held April 24 at Talladega Superspeedway. Ken Schrader won the pole. The race was broadcast on ABC.

Top ten results

1. #44 - Terry Labonte*
2. #87 - Joe Nemechek
3. #4 - Jeff Purvis
4. #17 - Matt Kenseth
5. #35 - Lyndon Amick
6. #3 - Dale Earnhardt Jr.
7. #00 - Larry Pearson
8. #27 - Casey Atwood
9. #1 - Randy LaJoie
10. #41 - David Green

Failed to qualify: Andy Kirby (#28), Mark Martin (#60)*, Loy Allen Jr. (#78), Hermie Sadler (#72), Skip Smith (#67), Joe Bessey (#6), Stevie Reeves (#25), Freddie Query (#68)

- Terry Labonte just barely edged Joe Nemechek at the finish, winning by 0.002 seconds, making it one of the closest finishes in Busch Series history.
- The Big One occurred on lap 70 when pole-sitter Schrader crashed in Turn 1, resulting in a 23-car pileup. No one was injured.
- This was Mark Martin's first DNQ in the Busch Series since February 1993.
- Elton Sawyer entered this race with a 1-point lead in Busch Series standings, but due to engine troubles just 15 laps into the race, Sawyer had to drop out of the race, causing him to drop from 1st to 3rd with a 114-point deficit to new standings leader Dale Earnhardt Jr..

=== Auto Club 300 ===
The Auto Club 300 was held May 1 at California Speedway. Dale Earnhardt Jr. won the pole. The race was broadcast on ABC and switched to ESPN2 except on the West Coast with 9 laps to go due to the race running into ABC's broadcasting window of the 125th Kentucky Derby.

Top ten results

1. #17 - Matt Kenseth
2. #9 - Jeff Burton
3. #3 - Dale Earnhardt Jr.
4. #45 - Adam Petty
5. #47 - Elliott Sadler
6. #36 - Tim Fedewa
7. #98 - Elton Sawyer
8. #21 - Michael Waltrip
9. #35 - Lyndon Amick
10. #77 - Ed Berrier

Failed to qualify: Jimmy Kitchens (#22), Stevie Reeves (#25), Kenny Irwin Jr. (#11), Curtis Markham (#83), Jerry Glanville (#81), Brett Bodine (#54), Shane Hall (#43), Andy Kirby (#28), Sterling Marlin (#42), Ward Burton (#02)

=== Busch 200 ===
The Busch 200 was held May 8 at New Hampshire International Speedway. Jeff Green won the pole. The race was broadcast on TNN.

Top ten results

1. #98 - Elton Sawyer*
2. #32 - Jeff Green
3. #4 - Jeff Purvis
4. #1 - Randy LaJoie
5. #27 - Casey Atwood
6. #57 - Jason Keller
7. #72 - Hermie Sadler
8. #17 - Matt Kenseth
9. #66 - Todd Bodine
10. #77 - Ed Berrier

Failed to qualify: Bryan Wall (#73), Bobby Dotter (#08), Wayne Grubb (#83), Joe Bessey (#6)

- This was Elton Sawyer's second and last career NASCAR victory.
- This was Akins Motorsports' first career NASCAR victory

=== Hardee's 250 ===
The Hardee's 250 was held May 14 at Richmond International Raceway. Jason Keller won the pole. The race was broadcast on ESPN2.

Top ten results

1. #60 - Mark Martin
2. #9 - Jeff Burton
3. #17 - Matt Kenseth
4. #66 - Todd Bodine
5. #32 - Jeff Green
6. #15 - Ken Schrader
7. #25 - Kenny Wallace
8. #21 - Michael Waltrip
9. #4 - Jeff Purvis
10. #93 - Dave Blaney

Failed to qualify: Johnny Benson (#33), R. D. Smith (#79), Ted Christopher (#13), Geoff Bodine (#64), Terry Labonte (#44), Chad Chaffin (#84), Philip Morris (#01), Brad Baker (#7), Andy Kirby (#28), Brad Loney (#90), Freddie Query (#68), Jeff Finley (#65), Jason Rudd (#81), Bobby Hamilton Jr. (#95)

=== First Union 200 ===
The First Union 200 was held May 23 at Nazareth Speedway. Jeff Green won the pole. The race was shortened to 168 laps due to darkness. The race was broadcast on ESPN2.

Top ten results

1. #17 - Matt Kenseth
2. #3 - Dale Earnhardt Jr.
3. #36 - Tim Fedewa
4. #93 - Dave Blaney
5. #45 - Adam Petty
6. #4 - Jeff Purvis
7. #32 - Jeff Green
8. #13 - Ted Christopher
9. #10 - Phil Parsons
10. #53 - Hank Parker Jr.

Failed to qualify: Wayne Grubb (#83), Joey McCarthy (#41), Chad Chaffin (#84), J. D. Gibbs (#18), Andy Kirby (#28), Bryan Wall (#77N), Dennis Demers (#86N), Mike Olsen (#61N)

- Curtis Markham qualified the #44 for Terry Labonte and Brad Bennett qualified the #47 for Elliott Sadler.

=== Carquest Auto Parts 300 ===
The Carquest Auto Parts 300 was held May 29 at Lowe's Motor Speedway. David Green won the pole. The race was broadcast on TBS.

Top ten results

1. #60 - Mark Martin
2. #3 - Dale Earnhardt Jr.
3. #17 - Matt Kenseth
4. #9 - Jeff Burton
5. #21 - Michael Waltrip
6. #54 - Brett Bodine
7. #63 - Chuck Bown
8. #98 - Elton Sawyer
9. #66 - Todd Bodine
10. #32 - Jeff Green

Failed to qualify: Terry Labonte (#44), Glenn Allen Jr. (#38), Jerry Nadeau (#90), Geoff Bodine (#64), Mike Wallace (#33), Bobby Hillin Jr. (#8), Philip Morris (#01), Jeff Fuller (#89), Kenny Irwin Jr. (#11), Tony Roper (#61), Larry Pearson (#00), Ed Berrier (#77), Mike Dillon (#59), Jim Bown (#65), Steve Grissom (#22), Lyndon Amick (#35), Andy Kirby (#28), Nathan Buttke (#30), Joe Buford (#7), Jeff Krogh (#56), Jimmy Kitchens (#55), Doug Reid III (#97)

=== MBNA Platinum 200 ===
The MBNA Platinum 200 was held June 5 at Dover International Speedway. Dick Trickle won the pole. The race was broadcast on TNN.

Top ten results

1. #3 - Dale Earnhardt Jr.
2. #02 - Ward Burton
3. #66 - Todd Bodine
4. #41 - David Green
5. #5 - Dick Trickle
6. #37 - Kevin Grubb
7. #32 - Jeff Green
8. #93 - Dave Blaney
9. #98 - Elton Sawyer
10. #57 - Jason Keller

Failed to qualify: Andy Santerre (#47)*, Jerry Glanville (#81), Brad Loney (#90), Hermie Sadler (#72), Joey McCarthy (#41), John Preston (#12), Hank Parker Jr. (#53), Lyndon Amick (#35)

- Andy Santerre returned to the Busch Series in this event after breaking his leg at Daytona in February.

=== Textilease/Medique 300 ===
The Textilease/Medique 300 was held June 12 at South Boston Speedway. Dale Earnhardt Jr. won the pole. The race was broadcast on TNN.

Top ten results

1. #3 - Dale Earnhardt Jr.
2. #32 - Jeff Green
3. #53 - Hank Parker Jr.
4. #4 - Jeff Purvis
5. #36 - Tim Fedewa
6. #17 - Matt Kenseth
7. #01 - Philip Morris
8. #61 - Tony Roper
9. #74 - Tony Raines
10. #27 - Casey Atwood

Failed to qualify: Greg Marlowe (#92), Jeff Krogh (#56), R. D. Smith (#79), Curtis Markham (#33), Andy Santerre (#47), Stanton Barrett (#40), Shane Hall (#43), Glenn Allen Jr. (#38), Ed Berrier (#77), Andy Kirby (#28)

- Chuck Bown and Larry Pearson made their final career NASCAR starts in this race, finishing 22nd and 25th respectively.

=== Lysol 200 ===
The Lysol 200 was held June 27 at Watkins Glen International. Ron Fellows won the pole. The race was broadcast on ESPN.

Top ten results

1. #3 - Dale Earnhardt Jr.*
2. #87 - Ron Fellows
3. #34 - Mike McLaughlin
4. #12 - Jack Baldwin
5. #57 - Jason Keller
6. #40 - Butch Miller
7. #59 - Mike Dillon
8. #93 - Dave Blaney
9. #66 - Todd Bodine
10. #53 - Hank Parker Jr.

Failed to qualify: Ted Christopher (#13), Jeff Krogh (#56), Eric Bodine (#21N), Stacy Compton (#28), J. D. Gibbs (#8N), Louis Rettenmeier (#59N)

- After winning his third consecutive race, Earnhardt Jr.'s championship lead extended to 129 points over Matt Kenseth.

=== DieHard 250 ===
The DieHard 250 was held July 4 at The Milwaukee Mile. Casey Atwood won the pole. The race was broadcast on TNN.

Top ten results

1. #27 - Casey Atwood*
2. #32 - Jeff Green
3. #3 - Dale Earnhardt Jr.
4. #38 - Glenn Allen Jr.
5. #17 - Matt Kenseth
6. #93 - Dave Blaney
7. #92 - Jimmie Johnson
8. #66 - Todd Bodine
9. #5 - Dick Trickle
10. #61 - Tony Roper

Failed to qualify: Mario Gosselin (#15), Bobby Dotter (#08), Rick Beebe (#82), Dennis Setzer (#11), Stacy Compton (#19), Jerry Glanville (#81), Mel Walen (#58), Brad Loney (#90)

- This was Casey Atwood's first career Busch Series victory, as he moved Jeff Green out of the way on the final turn of the final lap.
- Jeff Krogh suffered near-fatal injuries in a crash during final practice. Krogh recovered from the incident, but never raced in NASCAR again.
- Jay Sauter qualified the #00 for Buckshot Jones, Ron Hornaday Jr. qualified the #3 for Dale Earnhardt Jr., and Mike Wallace qualified the #25 car for Kenny Wallace.

=== Myrtle Beach 250 ===
The Myrtle Beach 250 was held July 17 at Myrtle Beach Speedway. Dale Earnhardt Jr. won the pole. The race was broadcast on TNN.

Top ten results

1. #32 - Jeff Green
2. #1 - Randy LaJoie
3. #17 - Matt Kenseth
4. #43 - Shane Hall
5. #90 - Brad Loney
6. #66 - Todd Bodine
7. #98 - Elton Sawyer
8. #57 - Jason Keller
9. #10 - Phil Parsons
10. #4 - Jeff Purvis

Failed to qualify: Philip Morris (#01), Glenn Allen Jr. (#38), Chad Chaffin (#84), Mark Green (#50), Andy Santerre (#47), Curtis Markham (#72), Adam Petty (#45), Bobby Hamilton Jr. (#63), Mario Gosselin (#58), Greg Marlowe (#92), Andy Kirby (#28), Kevin Grubb (#37), Ed Spencer III (#12), R. D. Smith (#79)

=== NAPA Autocare 250 ===
The NAPA Autocare 250 was held July 24 at Pikes Peak International Raceway. Dave Blaney won the pole. The race was broadcast on ESPN.

Top ten results

1. #47 - Andy Santerre*
2. #36 - Tim Fedewa
3. #66 - Todd Bodine
4. #32 - Jeff Green
5. #4 - Jeff Purvis
6. #5 - Dick Trickle
7. #17 - Matt Kenseth
8. #98 - Elton Sawyer
9. #27 - Casey Atwood
10. #10 - Phil Parsons

Failed to qualify: Scott Gaylord (#52), Jerry Glanville (#81), Chad Chaffin (#16)

- This was Santerre's only career Busch Series victory.
- Dale Earnhardt Jr. crashed out late in the race and finished 36th. This finish, combined with a 25th-place finish at Myrtle Beach, resulted in Earnhardt Jr. losing the championship lead to Matt Kenseth.

=== Carquest Auto Parts 250 ===
The Carquest Auto Parts 250 was held July 31 at Gateway International Raceway. Casey Atwood won the pole. The race was broadcast on TNN.

Top ten results

1. #3 - Dale Earnhardt Jr.*
2. #1 - Randy LaJoie
3. #87 - Joe Nemechek
4. #32 - Jeff Green
5. #57 - Jason Keller
6. #17 - Matt Kenseth
7. #27 - Casey Atwood
8. #93 - Dave Blaney
9. #34 - Mike McLaughlin
10. #66 - Todd Bodine

Failed to qualify: Lyndon Amick (#35), Gary Bradberry (#28), Ted Smokstad (#19), Eric Jones (#70), Gus Wasson (#96), Mel Walen (#58)

- This victory allowed Earnhardt Jr. to retake the championship lead, and he would hold it for the rest of the season.

=== Kroger 200 presented by Fifth Third Bank ===
The Kroger 200 was held August 6 at Indianapolis Raceway Park. Jason Keller won the pole. The race was broadcast on ESPN.

Top ten results

1. #57 - Jason Keller
2. #66 - Todd Bodine
3. #32 - Jeff Green
4. #17 - Matt Kenseth
5. #3 - Dale Earnhardt Jr.
6. #4 - Jeff Purvis
7. #36 - Tim Fedewa
8. #98 - Elton Sawyer
9. #40 - Butch Miller
10. #74 - Tony Raines

Failed to qualify: Brad Baker (#7), Brad Loney (#90), Tony Roper (#61), D.J. Hoelzle (#55), Greg Marlowe (#92), Gus Wasson (#96)

- Dennis Setzer qualified the #11 for Kenny Irwin Jr.

=== NAPA 200 ===
The NAPA 200 was held August 21 at Michigan International Speedway. Dave Blaney won the pole. The race was broadcast on ESPN.

Top ten results

1. #3 - Dale Earnhardt Jr.
2. #24 - Jeff Gordon
3. #93 - Dave Blaney
4. #02 - Ward Burton
5. #60 - Mark Martin
6. #21 - Michael Waltrip
7. #9 - Jeff Burton
8. #12 - Jimmy Spencer
9. #77 - Kevin Lepage
10. #4 - Jeff Purvis

Failed to qualify: Curtis Markham (#72), Ted Musgrave (#82), Hank Parker Jr. (#53), Phil Parsons (#10), Tony Roper (#61), Tim Fedewa (#36), Bobby Hillin Jr. (#8), Butch Miller (#40), Wayne Grubb (#83), Greg Sacks (#90), Ricky Craven (#47), Chad Chaffin (#16), Glenn Allen Jr. (#38), Gus Wasson (#96), Ted Christopher (#13), Ernie Irvan (#84)*, Matt Hutter (#99)

- Ernie Irvan was seriously injured in a practice crash in turn 4. The crash resulted in Irvan retiring from racing.

=== Food City 250 ===
The Food City 250 was held August 27 at Bristol Motor Speedway. Jeff Green won the pole. The race was broadcast on ESPN2.

Top ten results

1. #17 - Matt Kenseth
2. #21 - Michael Waltrip
3. #3 - Dale Earnhardt Jr.
4. #14 - Sterling Marlin
5. #66 - Todd Bodine
6. #25 - Kenny Wallace
7. #98 - Elton Sawyer
8. #44 - Terry Labonte
9. #93 - Dave Blaney
10. #8 - Bobby Hillin Jr.

Failed to qualify: Steve Grissom (#22), Kevin Lepage (#99), Tony Roper (#61), Hermie Sadler (#33), Kenny Irwin Jr. (#11), Bobby Hamilton Jr. (#63), Butch Miller (#40), Glenn Allen Jr. (#38), Hank Parker Jr. (#53), Carl Long (#95), Kelly Denton (#75), Kerry Earnhardt (#76)

=== Dura Lube 200 ===
The Dura Lube 200 was held September 4 at Darlington Raceway. Ward Burton won the pole. The race was broadcast on ESPN2.

Top ten results

1. #60 - Mark Martin
2. #93 - Dave Blaney
3. #17 - Matt Kenseth
4. #02 - Ward Burton
5. #87 - Joe Nemechek
6. #25 - Kenny Wallace
7. #9 - Jeff Burton
8. #4 - Jeff Purvis
9. #14 - Sterling Marlin
10. #66 - Todd Bodine

Failed to qualify: Hermie Sadler (#33), Ted Musgrave (#40), Kevin Harvick (#2), Terry Labonte (#44), Greg Sacks (#90), Curtis Markham (#72), Andy Santerre (#47), Lyndon Amick (#88), Ed Berrier (#55), Kerry Earnhardt (#7), Tom Hubert (#15)

=== Autolite Platinum 250 ===
The Autolite Platinum 250 was held September 10 at Richmond International Raceway. Jeff Burton won the pole. The race was broadcast on ESPN.

Top ten results

1. #3 - Dale Earnhardt Jr.
2. #60 - Mark Martin
3. #12 - Jimmy Spencer
4. #25 - Kenny Wallace
5. #37 - Kevin Grubb
6. #35 - Elliott Sadler
7. #41 - David Green
8. #4 - Jeff Purvis
9. #77 - Chad Chaffin
10. #57 - Jason Keller

Failed to qualify: Hank Parker Jr. (#53), Michael Waltrip (#21), Ricky Hendrick (#24), Brett Bodine (#54), Brad Loney (#90), Michael Ritch (#55), Kenny Irwin Jr. (#11), Philip Morris (#01), Hut Stricklin (#38), Ted Christopher (#13), R. D. Smith (#79), Jason Rudd (#81), Jimmy Kitchens (#7), Jason White (#28), Mario Gosselin (#58), Hal Goodson (#39)

=== MBNA Gold 200 ===
The MBNA Gold 200 was held September 25 at Dover International Speedway. Matt Kenseth won the pole. The race was broadcast on TNN.

Top ten results

1. #27 - Casey Atwood
2. #1 - Randy LaJoie
3. #32 - Jeff Green
4. #74 - Tony Raines
5. #11 - Kenny Irwin Jr.
6. #25 - Kenny Wallace
7. #46 - David Green
8. #10 - Phil Parsons
9. #34 - Mike McLaughlin
10. #00 - Buckshot Jones

Failed to qualify: Jason Leffler (#18), Kelly Denton (#75), Lance Hooper (#23), Rich Bickle (#63), Joey McCarthy (#41), Michael Ritch (#55), Ted Christopher (#13), Jimmy Kitchens (#7), Ken Alexander (#03)

- Championship leaders Dale Earnhardt Jr. and Matt Kenseth crashed together on lap 121 while battling for the lead, resulting in them finishing 33rd and 38th respectively.

=== All Pro Bumper to Bumper 300 ===
The All Pro Bumper to Bumper 300 was held October 9 at Lowe's Motor Speedway. Matt Kenseth won the pole. The race was broadcast on TBS.

Top ten results

1. #21 - Michael Waltrip
2. #24 - Jeff Gordon
3. #34 - Mike McLaughlin
4. #12 - Jimmy Spencer
5. #3 - Dale Earnhardt Jr.
6. #02 - Ward Burton
7. #17 - Matt Kenseth
8. #87 - Joe Nemechek
9. #66 - Todd Bodine
10. #19 - Mike Skinner

Failed to qualify: Brett Bodine (#54), Hermie Sadler (#47), Curtis Markham (#72), Kelly Denton (#75), Rich Bickle (#91), Robert Pressley (#61), Ken Schrader (#15), Bobby Hillin Jr. (#8), Chad Chaffin (#77), Kenny Irwin Jr. (#11), Derrike Cope (#89), Ed Berrier (#78), Mike Garvey (#09), Elliott Sadler (#35), Morgan Shepherd (#7), Wayne Grubb (#83), Joe Buford (#95), Gary Bradberry (#86), Kevin Schwantz (#65), Adam Petty (#45)

=== Kmart 200 ===
The Kmart 200 was held October 23 at North Carolina Speedway. Mark Martin won the pole. The race was broadcast on TNN.

Top ten results

1. #60 - Mark Martin
2. #32 - Jeff Green
3. #93 - Dave Blaney
4. #17 - Matt Kenseth
5. #66 - Todd Bodine
6. #33 - Johnny Benson
7. #25 - Kenny Wallace
8. #57 - Jason Keller
9. #41 - David Green
10. #61 - Morgan Shepherd

Failed to qualify: Hut Stricklin (#38), Ken Schrader (#15), Sterling Marlin (#14), Rich Bickle (#91), Lance Hooper (#23), Jimmy Hensley (#83), Mike Borkowski (#02), Hermie Sadler (#47), Johnny Chapman (#73), Greg Biffle (#19), Ed Berrier (#63), Kelly Moore (#48), Mike Laughlin Jr. (#94), Philip Morris (#01)

=== Sam's Town 250 ===
The inaugural Sam's Town 250 was held October 30 at Memphis Motorsports Park. Jeff Green won the pole. The race was broadcast on TNN.

Top ten results

1. #32 - Jeff Green
2. #3 - Dale Earnhardt Jr.
3. #98 - Elton Sawyer
4. #66 - Todd Bodine
5. #45 - Adam Petty
6. #5 - Dick Trickle
7. #34 - Mike McLaughlin
8. #37 - Kevin Grubb
9. #36 - Tim Fedewa
10. #35 - Lyndon Amick

Failed to qualify: J. D. Gibbs (#42), Jimmy Spencer (#12), Jimmy Morales (#82), Kenny Wallace (#25), Brad Baker (#7), Ricky Hendrick (#24), Joe Buford (#67), Brian Smith (#76), R. D. Smith (#13), Kevin Lepage (#99), Sean Studer (#68), Ron Young (#71), Kelly Moore (#48), Kevin Ray (#95), Mike Garvey (#09), Kelly Denton (#75)

=== Outback Steakhouse 200 ===
The inaugural Outback Steakhouse 200 was held November 6 at Phoenix International Raceway. Ken Schrader won the pole. The race was broadcast on TNN.

Top ten results

1. #24 - Jeff Gordon*
2. #3 - Dale Earnhardt Jr.*
3. #12 - Jimmy Spencer
4. #9 - Jeff Burton
5. #25 - Kenny Wallace
6. #31 - Ron Hornaday Jr.
7. #15 - Ken Schrader
8. #17 - Matt Kenseth
9. #66 - Todd Bodine
10. #00 - Buckshot Jones

Failed to qualify: Joe Nemechek (#87), Bobby Hamilton (#80), Jimmy Hensley (#83), Greg Sacks (#90), Jimmy Morales (#14), Dave Steele (#82), Damon Lusk (#70)

- Dale Earnhardt Jr. won the 1999 Busch Series championship in this race, as his 2nd-place finish extended his points lead to 189 points over Matt Kenseth, just four points over the maximum amount that can be earned in a single race.
- Earnhardt Jr. became the forth back-to-back champion in the Busch Series, joining Sam Ard, Larry Pearson, and Randy LaJoie.
- First win for Gordon-Evernham Motorsports. This was also the only win with Ray Evernham as co-owner. Evernham would sell his half of the team at seasons end to go develop his own team with Dodge for the 2001 Winston Cup season. Rick Hendrick bought Evernham's share and the team was renamed to JG Motorsports for 2000.

=== HotWheels.com 300 ===
The HotWheels.com 300 was held November 13 at Homestead-Miami Speedway. Hut Stricklin won the pole. The race was broadcast on NBC, NBC's first Busch Series telecast.

Top ten results

1. #87 - Joe Nemechek
2. #3 - Dale Earnhardt Jr.*
3. #12 - Jimmy Spencer
4. #53 - Hank Parker Jr.
5. #32 - Jeff Green
6. #99 - Kevin Lepage
7. #41 - David Green
8. #9 - Jeff Burton
9. #22 - Bobby Hamilton Jr.
10. #02 - Ward Burton

Failed to qualify: Mike Garvey (#09), Greg Sacks (#90), Ron Young (#71), Ted Christopher (#28), John Preston (#89), Bobby Hamilton (#80), Morgan Shepherd (#76), Barry Bodine (#6), Steve Park (#84), Wayne Grubb (#83), Mark Green (#50), Sean Studer (#68), Joe Buford (#7), Jimmy Morales (#82), Randy MacDonald (#54), Curtis Markham (#63), Andy Santerre (#44), Kevin Grubb (#37), Johnny Chapman (#73), Derrick Gilcrest (#15)-Withdrew

- Matt Kenseth suffered heavy damage in a multi-car crash on lap 1. Kenseth finished 26 laps down in 38th, resulting in him losing 2nd in the championship to Jeff Green.
- Kenseth's misfortune allowed series champion Dale Earnhardt Jr. to further extended his points lead, ultimately ending the season with a 280-point lead over Jeff Green.

== Full Drivers' Championship ==
(key) Bold – Pole position awarded by time. Italics – Pole position set by owner's points. * – Most laps led.

Pos	Driver	DAY	CAR	LVS	ATL	DAR	TEX	NSV	BRI	TAL	CAL	NHA	RCH	NAZ	CLT	DOV	SBO	GLN	MIL	MYB	PPR	GTY	IRP	MCH	BRI	DAR	RCH	DOV	CLT	CAR	MEM	PHO	HOM	Pts
1	Dale Earnhardt Jr.	14	35	6	3	11	10	**9**	2	6	3*	34	32	2	2	1*	**1**	1	3	**25**	36	1*	5	1*	3	12	1	33	5	13	2	2	2*	4647
2	Jeff Green	2	DNQ	8	17	25	3	1*	23	17	32	**2***	5*	**7***	10	7	2	40	2	1	4*	4	3	16	**12**	17	29	3	15	2	**1***	11	5	4367
3	Matt Kenseth	4	3*	30	25	1*	18*	15	35	4	1	8	3	1	3	32	6	16	5	3	7	6	4	22	1*	3	20	**38***	**7***	4	21	8	38	4327
4	Todd Bodine	32	9	40	5	10	37	5	5	31	25	9	4	15	9	3	12	9	8	6	3	10	2	13	5	10	38	32	9	5	4*	9	32	4029
5	Elton Sawyer	21	7	26	8	2	12	8	3	41	7	1	34	32	8	9	23	11	34	7	8	13	8	26	7	14	16	26	19	14	3	15	13	3891
6	Jeff Purvis	41	12	12	41	13	19	6	42	3	19	3	9	6	17	25	4	36	15	10	5	20	6	10	14	8	8	25	13	40	27	13	25	3658
7	Dave Blaney	43	11	20	**2**	42	**8**	31	24	14	28	19	10	4	19	8		8	6	13	**24**	8	38	**3**	9	2	39	24	20	3	11	19	16	3582
8	Jason Keller	22	33	10	15	12	6	3	**1***	40	29	6	**30**	16	11	10	28	5	36	8	33	5	**1***	27	21	23	10	28	29	8	29	40	26	3537
9	Mike McLaughlin	15	6	19	12	16	4	7	27	21	41	40	14	28	27	28	15	3	11	12	15	9	17	24	39	38	43	9	3	16	7	16	20	3478
10	Randy LaJoie	1*	4	15	26	43	17	38	36	9	34	4	42	20	13	27	24	17	14	2*	13	2	13	40	11	16	33	2	38	26	26	17	29	3379
11	Dick Trickle	26	DNQ	31	31	37	DNQ	42	21	11	26	11	11	13	31	**5**	21*	20	9	17	6	16	14	29	17	21	12	12	16	19	6	24	35	3154
12	Tony Raines **(R)**	28	20	28	21	21	QL	11	39	24	17	13	17	11	18	17	9	13	21	19	25	21	10	30	30	25	36	4	25	12	28	20	28	3142
13	Casey Atwood	17	5	DNQ	16	28	35	2	15	8	18	5	20	33	34	36	10	41	**1***	29	9	**7**	32	42	15	26	31	1	23	43	30	26	34	3134
14	Tim Fedewa	35	10	34	DNQ	8	21	37	9	28	6	23	33	3	38	21	5	27	31	27	2	43	7	DNQ	25	28	14	41	26	17	9	35	15	2989
15	Phil Parsons	33	28	13	28	3	24	10	28	35	42	25	15	9	23	19	13	22	20	9	10	35	15	DNQ	33	29	34	8	42	21	16	43	24	2951
16	Mike Dillon	18	19	DNQ	13	34	28	18	32	26	13	32	13	21	DNQ	16	27	7	35	30	27	31	23	19	23	31	27	13	12	33	18	37	27	2795
17	Kevin Grubb	8	16	DNQ	DNQ	18	25	27	7	30	40	17	27	18	42	6	14	31	29	DNQ	17	36	28	20	37	20	5	39	39	38	8	21	DNQ	2607
18	Hank Parker Jr. **(R)**	DNQ	26	21	39	31	20	36	38	19	33	29	38	10	22	DNQ	3	10	25	11	18	24	18	DNQ	DNQ	30	DNQ	20	22	29	35	12	4	2559
19	Bobby Hillin Jr.	5	34	DNQ	19	22	34	14	13	29	24	35	12	25	DNQ	43	11		12	15	14	18		DNQ	10	35	21	29	DNQ	20	19	42	23	2517
20	Adam Petty **(R)**	6	DNQ	29	34	24	39	13	18	23	4	24	28	5	43	40	33	32	30	DNQ	29	34	27	35	22	15	40	30	DNQ	30	5	38	33	2471
21	Mark Green	24	23	32	10	33	31	30	17	37	36	27	21	22	16	29	26	37	26	DNQ	23	32	19	41	42	33	19	22	40	28	17	31	DNQ	2419
22	Jeff Fuller	23	42	27	DNQ	19	26	20	19	32	12	39	41	19	DNQ	31	20	15	32		12	37	12	17	20	13	30	43	37		33		36	2280
23	Kenny Wallace						DNQ	26	6			22	7		15	13			17	21		27		38	6	6	4	6	27	7	DNQ	5	19	2167
24	Shane Hall	DNQ	18	DNQ	DNQ	20	DNQ	DNQ	37	27	DNQ	38	31	23	37	35	DNQ	24	22	4	38	17	11	21	16	37	25	14	24	36	25	25	40	2154
25	Jeff Burton	9	1*	3		6	2				2		2		4									7		7	**35**		14			4	8	2091
26	Mark Martin	39	2	**1***	6	**39**	1			DNQ			1		1*									5		1*	2*		36	**1***			14	2048
27	David Green		DNQ	22		7	22		33	10	14		16		**14**	4								14	19	40	7	7	18	9			7	2010
28	Buckshot Jones							12				16				22		19	16	23	39	40	33	11	35	11	26	10	11	18	36	10	17	1889
29	Michael Waltrip	40		39	11	9	11		11		8		8		5	20								6	2		DNQ	35	1			41		1762
30	Terry Labonte	19		14	24	4	14		4	1	22	20	DNQ	38	DNQ	14								36	8	DNQ		11	33			34		1761
31	Ed Berrier	DNQ	29	DNQ	14	15	DNQ	23	12	22	10	10	19	29	DNQ	37	DNQ		19	28	16	22	20	31		DNQ			DNQ	DNQ				1705
32	Glenn Allen Jr.	16	DNQ	DNQ	9	30	27	29	26	13	21	28	26	14	DNQ	24	DNQ	29	4	DNQ	37	33	24	DNQ	DNQ		42	40						1692
33	Joe Nemechek	36		2	27	QL	38	4		2	31				32							3				5			8			DNQ	1	1485
34	Lyndon Amick	29	37	43	29	DNQ	41	DNQ	41	5	9	26	43	37	DNQ	DNQ	19			24	32	DNQ	21			DNQ		27			10	28	42	1483
35	Kevin Lepage	7	36	9	4	5	43	39					23		40							11		9	DNQ		17		31		DNQ		6	1476
36	Elliott Sadler			7	42	35	42	16	DNQ	Wth	5	15	35	12	28									25	24	24	6		DNQ	23				1454
37	Hermie Sadler	DNQ	25	DNQ	DNQ	38	32	22	DNQ	DNQ	Wth	7	22	42	25	DNQ				31	11	14		32	DNQ	DNQ	24	42	DNQ	DNQ	23	22	30	1449
38	Chuck Bown	11	24	25	40	17	23	40	31	25	35	18	29	31	7	41	22																	1370
39	Bobby Hamilton Jr. **(R)**	30	27	DNQ	DNQ	27	DNQ	DNQ	Wth	33			DNQ					26	39	DNQ	21	28	42	23	DNQ	42	41	21	30	39	22	30	9	1351
40	Brad Loney	10	DNQ	DNQ	DNQ	29	DNQ	28	34	36	43	37	DNQ	36		DNQ	16	35	DNQ	5	19	42	DNQ		32		DNQ	37		11	41			1306
41	Tony Roper **(R)**					40	16	35	10	18	30	43	18	43	DNQ	42	8	42	10	18	40	30	DNQ	DNQ	DNQ									1284
42	Ken Schrader	**38**		18	38		7		14	**34**			6		12							12		15			37		DNQ	DNQ		**7**		1270
43	Jimmy Spencer			5			DNQ				15				39									8	34		3		4		DNQ	3	3	1197
44	Mike Skinner		DNQ	24	1*	36	9				37				29									37		36	18	31	10			33	18	1195
45	Wayne Grubb	DNQ	30	DNQ	32					38		DNQ	40	DNQ	30	38	17		38	32	42	15	30	DNQ	31	43	15	23	DNQ		34		DNQ	1187
46	Johnny Benson	37	14	11	43		15				38	21	DNQ		35	12												34		6		14	37	1173
47	Geoff Bodine	QL	8	17	7	14			25		16	41	DNQ		DNQ	15						41							17		38			1093
48	Stanton Barrett						DNQ	19	16	15	20	30	37	24	20	23	DNQ														24	23	43	1074
49	Larry Pearson	25	13	DNQ	20	23	30		30	7	27		25	30	DNQ		25																	1032
50	Jeff Krogh	DNQ	32	41	22	26	36	21	40	39	23	31	24	35	DNQ	18	DNQ	DNQ	43															960
51	Jeff Gordon			4			13								33									2					2			1		878
52	Steve Grissom						40		22			14	36		DNQ	39					30			34	DNQ				35	27	13	36	41	855
53	Ward Burton										DNQ					2								4		**4**	32		6				10	851
54	Sterling Marlin			33			DNQ	34	8		DNQ													12	4	9				DNQ	31			777
55	Chad Chaffin							DNQ					DNQ	DNQ			31		27	DNQ	DNQ		29	DNQ			9	36	DNQ	31	15	39	22	752
56	Curtis Markham	12			37				DNQ		DNQ			QL			DNQ	33	42	DNQ	31	38	22	DNQ	38	DNQ	13		DNQ	41			DNQ	709
57	Andy Santerre	42														DNQ	DNQ	30	13	DNQ	1	19	35		13	DNQ							DNQ	702
58	Justin Labonte							41									30		33	14		26	25				23			34	40			669
59	Butch Miller																	6	18	22	28	23	9	DNQ	DNQ									667
60	Jason Jarrett	27	21	38	23	41	DNQ	24	DNQ	43	39											25												624
61	Kenny Irwin Jr.						5				DNQ				DNQ	11							16	33	DNQ		DNQ	5	DNQ					619
62	Hut Stricklin																									22	DNQ	16	21	DNQ	42	29	**21**	530
63	Jimmie Johnson																		7											25	12	18	39	521
64	Rich Bickle																							39		27	11	DNQ	DNQ	DNQ	39	27	11	516
65	Matt Hutter									16	11								41	26	22			DNQ										467
66	Ted Christopher **(R)**								DNQ			12	DNQ	8		30		DNQ	40			29		DNQ			DNQ	DNQ					DNQ	461
67	Andy Kirby **(R)**		31	42	DNQ	DNQ	DNQ	33	20	DNQ	DNQ	36	DNQ	DNQ	DNQ	26	DNQ			DNQ														414
68	Ron Hornaday Jr.	34																	QL				39									6*	12	394
69	Brett Bodine						33				DNQ				6									18			DNQ		DNQ	15				387
70	Derrike Cope	DNQ	15	23	35																				40	32			DNQ					380
71	Joe Bessey	DNQ	38							DNQ		DNQ		17		33						39						18						380
72	Jimmy Kitchens **(R)**	31	DNQ	DNQ	30	DNQ	DNQ	32	29	42	DNQ			41	DNQ												DNQ	DNQ						363
73	Gus Wasson				18										26							DNQ	DNQ	DNQ	36				43				31	358
74	Jason Leffler																						41				22	DNQ		24	20			331
75	Kelly Denton **(R)**	DNQ							DNQ	20					41										DNQ	34		DNQ	DNQ	22	DNQ			306
76	Gary Bradberry					32			DNQ						21						20	DNQ		43					DNQ					304
77	Robert Pressley																									18	28	17	DNQ					300
78	Barry Bodine	DNQ					29	25		12																							DNQ	296
79	Philip Morris **(R)**		DNQ	35			DNQ						DNQ		DNQ		7			DNQ					28		DNQ			DNQ				283
80	Bobby Hamilton																							28				15	28			DNQ	DNQ	276
81	Kerry Earnhardt **(R)**	20	43	36	33	DNQ																			DNQ	DNQ								256
82	Joe Buford			DNQ			DNQ	17	43						DNQ										26				DNQ		DNQ		DNQ	231
83	Mike Garvey	DNQ		37															23										DNQ	32	DNQ		DNQ	213
84	Mike Bliss																	28	24				43											204
85	Ron Fellows																	**2***																180
86	Jamie Skinner											33													29						43			174
87	Jack Baldwin																	4																165
88	Andy Hillenburg	3																																165
89	Rick Beebe																		DNQ				40								14			164
90	Kevin Schwantz														36													19	DNQ					161
91	Blaise Alexander	DNQ		Wth											24														32					158
92	Ricky Hendrick																			20							DNQ			37	DNQ			155
93	Jim Bown	DNQ				DNQ									DNQ											19			41					151
94	Morgan Shepherd	DNQ		DNQ																									DNQ	10			DNQ	134
95	Scott Hansen																		28				37											131
96	Jack Sprague																	12																127
97	Jeff Finley	13	DNQ	DNQ	DNQ	DNQ							DNQ																					124
98	Scott Lagasse																	14																121
99	Jason White																						26		43		DNQ							119
100	Nathan Buttke														DNQ					16														115
101	Bobby Labonte		DNQ	16		DNQ					Wth																							115
102	Ted Musgrave		17	DNQ																				DNQ		DNQ								112
103	David Blankenship																29				43													110
104	Michael Ritch																										DNQ	DNQ		35	37			110
105	Brad Teague																								18									109
106	Tom Hubert																18									DNQ								109
107	Ernie Irvan												39			34								DNQ										107
108	Brad Leighton													34				43	37				36											107
109	Mike Stefanik	DNQ	22	Wth																														102
110	Mark Krogh	DNQ	39	DNQ	36	DNQ	DNQ																											101
111	Bill Lester																	21																100
112	Scott Gaylord																	25			DNQ													88
113	Rick Fuller													26																				85
114	Ted Smokstad																				26	DNQ												85
115	Brandon Sperling																								27									82
116	Matt Sielsky																						31											70
117	Dale Shaw													44			32																	67
118	Mike Borkowski																													DNQ	32			67
119	Lance Hooper	DNQ																										DNQ		DNQ		32		67
120	Hal Goodson																			33							DNQ							64
121	Derrick Gilchrist																						34										Wth	61
122	Jimmy Foster																			34														61
123	Greg Sacks																							DNQ		DNQ			34			DNQ	DNQ	61
124	Damon Lusk																				34											DNQ		61
125	D. J. Hoelzle																			35			DNQ											58
126	Brad Baker							DNQ					DNQ								35		DNQ								DNQ			58
127	Dale Jarrett																									39								46
128	Chris Cook							DNQ										39																46
129	Mike Swaim Jr.		40																															43
130	J. D. Gibbs		41		DNQ			DNQ						DNQ				DNQ													DNQ			40
131	Mark Day	DNQ			DNQ		DNQ	DNQ																	41						Wth			40
132	Mike Wallace														DNQ				QL							41								40
133	Kelly Moore											42		39				34												DNQ	DNQ			37
134	Kevin Harvick																									DNQ				42				37
135	R. D. Smith							43					DNQ				DNQ			DNQ							DNQ				DNQ			34
136	Eric Jones			DNQ														44				DNQ												31
137	Steve Portenga																				41													
138	John Preston													27		DNQ		38															DNQ	
139	Mike Olsen													DNQ				18																
140	Bryan Wall		DNQ	DNQ								DNQ		DNQ				23																
141	Tom Carey Jr.													40																				
142	Jeff McClure	DNQ																																
143	Freddie Query	DNQ	DNQ	DNQ	DNQ	DNQ	Wth	DNQ	DNQ	DNQ	Wth	Wth	DNQ																					
144	Skip Smith **(R)**	DNQ								DNQ																								
145	Mario Gosselin		DNQ																DNQ	DNQ							DNQ							
146	Jerry Glanville			DNQ							DNQ					DNQ			DNQ		DNQ													
147	Steve Park						DNQ																										DNQ	
148	Scot Walters							DNQ																										
149	Donnie Moran							DNQ																										
150	Loy Allen Jr.	Wth								DNQ																								
151	Stevie Reeves									DNQ	DNQ																							
152	Bobby Dotter											DNQ							DNQ															
153	Jason Rudd												DNQ														DNQ							
154	Dennis Demers													DNQ																				
155	Joey McCarthy													DNQ		DNQ												DNQ						
156	Jerry Nadeau														DNQ																			
157	Doug Reid III														DNQ																			
158	Greg Marlowe																DNQ			DNQ			DNQ											
159	Eric Bodine																	DNQ																
160	Louis Rettenmeier																	DNQ																
161	Stacy Compton																	DNQ	DNQ															
162	Dennis Setzer																		DNQ				QL											
163	Mel Walen																		DNQ			DNQ												
164	Ed Spencer III																			DNQ														
165	Ricky Craven																							DNQ										
166	Carl Long																								DNQ									
167	Ken Alexander																											DNQ						
168	Greg Biffle																													DNQ				
169	Mike Laughlin Jr.																													DNQ				
170	Jimmy Hensley																													DNQ		DNQ		
171	Johnny Chapman																													DNQ			DNQ	
172	Kevin Ray																														DNQ			
173	Brian Smith																														DNQ			
174	Jimmy Morales																														DNQ	DNQ	DNQ	
175	Ron Young																														DNQ		DNQ	
176	Sean Studer																														DNQ		DNQ	
177	Dave Steele																															DNQ		
178	Randy MacDonald																																DNQ	
179	Anthony Lazzaro																													Wth				
180	Brad Bennett													QL																				
181	Jay Sauter																		QL															
Pos	Driver	DAY	CAR	LVS	ATL	DAR	TEX	NSV	BRI	TAL	CAL	NHA	RCH	NAZ	CLT	DOV	SBO	GLN	MIL	MYB	PPR	GTY	IRP	MCH	BRI	DAR	RCH	DOV	CLT	CAR	MEM	PHO	HOM	Pts

== Rookie of the Year ==
The winner of the 1999 rookie battle was Tony Raines, a former American Speed Association champion. He had three top-ten finishes en route to a twelfth-place finish in points. Hank Parker Jr. was the runner-up, while fourth-generation driver and preseason favorite Adam Petty struggled with consistency and finished third. Bobby Hamilton Jr. and Tony Roper spent the season bouncing from ride to ride, and were unable to make a strong threat for the award. Kelly Denton, Philip Morris, Kerry Earnhardt, and Skip Smith all declared for the ROTY award, but could not mount a full-season attempt.

== See also ==
- 1999 NASCAR Winston Cup Series
- 1999 NASCAR Craftsman Truck Series
- 1999 NASCAR Winston West Series
- 1999 NASCAR Goody's Dash Series
- 1999 ARCA Bondo/Mar-Hyde Series
