= Jeff Finley (racing driver) =

American racing driver (born 1963)

- Born: August 16, 1963 (age 63); Lansing, Michigan, U.S.

NASCAR O'Reilly Auto Parts Series career
- 1 race run over 2 years
- Best finish: 97th (1999)
- First race: 1999 NAPA Auto Parts 300 (Daytona)
Wins	Top tens	Poles
0	0	0

NASCAR FedEx Freight Truck Series career
- 1 race run over 1 year
- Best finish: 84th (2002)
- First race: 2002 Advance Auto Parts 250 (Martinsville)
Wins	Top tens	Poles
0	0	0

ARCA Menards Series career
- 67 races run over 10 years
- Best finish: 6th (1998)
- First race: 1992 GM Goodwrench 200 (Michigan)
- Last race: 2002 Jasper Engines & Transmissions 200 (Toledo)
- First win: 1999 Southern Illinois 100 (DuQuoin)
Wins	Top tens	Poles
1	38	1
- Statistics up to date as of November 29, 2024.

Jeff Finley (born August 16, 1963) is an American former professional stock car racing driver who has competed in the NASCAR Busch Series, the NASCAR Craftsman Truck Series, and the ARCA Re/Max Series. He is the father of fellow racing driver Chad Finley, who has competed in the Truck Series and ARCA.

Finley has also previously competed in series such as the ARTGO Challenge Series, the USAR Hooters Late Model Series, the ASA National Tour, and the Iceman Super Car Series.

== Motorsports results ==
=== NASCAR ===
(key) (Bold - Pole position awarded by qualifying time. Italics - Pole position earned by points standings or practice time. * – Most laps led.)

==== Busch Series ====
NASCAR Busch Series results
Year	Team	No.	Make	1	2	3	4	5	6	7	8	9	10	11	12	13	14	15	16	17	18	19	20	21	22	23	24	25	26	27	28	29	30	31	32	NBSC	Pts	Ref
1998	Team Rensi Motorsports	79	Chevy	DAY	CAR	LVS	NSV	DAR	BRI	TEX	HCY	TAL	NHA	NZH	CLT	DOV	RCH	PPR	GLN	MLW	MYB	CAL	SBO	IRP	MCH	BRI	DAR	RCH	DOV	CLT	GTY	CAR; DNQ	ATL; DNQ	HOM		N/A	0	
1999	Team Rensi Motorsports	25	Chevy	DAY; 13	CAR; DNQ	LVS; DNQ	ATL; DNQ	DAR; DNQ	TEX	NSV	BRI	TAL	CAL	NHA																						97th	124	
1999	N/A	65	Chevy												RCH; DNQ	NZH	CLT	DOV	SBO	GLN	MLW	MYB	PPR	GTY	IRP	MCH	BRI	DAR	RCH	DOV	CLT	CAR	MEM	PHO	HOM	97th	124	

==== Craftsman Truck Series ====
NASCAR Craftsman Truck Series results
Year	Team	No.	Make	1	2	3	4	5	6	7	8	9	10	11	12	13	14	15	16	17	18	19	20	21	22	NCTC	Pts	Ref
2002	James Bailey	70	Ford	DAY	DAR	MAR; 26	GTY	PPR	DOV	TEX	MEM	MLW	KAN	KEN	NHA	MCH	IRP	NSH	RCH	TEX	SBO	LVS	CAL	PHO	HOM	84th	85	

=== ARCA Re/Max Series ===
(key) (Bold – Pole position awarded by qualifying time. Italics – Pole position earned by points standings or practice time. * – Most laps led. ** – All laps led.)

ARCA Re/Max Series results
Year	Team	No.	Make	1	2	3	4	5	6	7	8	9	10	11	12	13	14	15	16	17	18	19	20	21	22	23	24	25	ARMSC	Pts	Ref
1992	Assiff Racing	6	Chevy	DAY	FIF	TWS	TAL	TOL	KIL	POC	MCH; 11	FRS	KIL	NSH	DEL	POC	HPT	FRS	ISF	TOL	DSF	TWS	SLM	ATL					N/A	0	
1993	Assiff Racing	42	Chevy	DAY	FIF	TWS	TAL	KIL	CMS	FRS	TOL	POC	MCH; 6	FRS	POC	KIL	ISF	DSF	TOL	SLM	WIN	ATL; 23							N/A	0	
1994	Assiff Racing	42	Chevy	DAY; 38	TAL	FIF	LVL	KIL	TOL	FRS	MCH; 28	DMS	POC	POC	KIL	FRS	INF	I70	ISF	DSF	TOL	SLM	WIN	ATL					N/A	0	
1996	Ken Schrader Racing	53	Chevy	DAY	ATL	SLM	TAL	FIF	LVL	CLT; 7	CLT	KIL	FRS	POC	MCH	FRS	TOL	POC	MCH	INF	SBS	ISF	DSF	KIL	SLM	WIN	CLT	ATL	N/A	0	
1997	RaDiUs Motorsports	99	Ford	DAY	ATL	SLM	CLT	CLT	POC; 22	MCH; 14	SBS; 4	TOL; 5	KIL; 5	FRS; 5	MIN; 20	POC; 12	MCH; 23	DSF; 33	GTW; 12	SLM; 10	WIN; 3	CLT; 37	TAL; 12	ISF; 9	ATL; 10				7th	3585	
1998	RaDiUs Motorsports	99	Ford	DAY; 21	ATL; 11																								6th	4350	
1998	Schrader-Finley Racing	99	Ford			SLM; 8	CLT; 18																						6th	4350	
1998	Team Rensi Motorsports	83	Chevy					MEM; 2	MCH; 3	POC; 4	**SBS**; 2	TOL; 5	PPR; 8	POC; 31	KIL; 21	FRS; 3	ISF; 23	ATL; 2	DSF; 23	SLM; 22	TEX; 34	WIN; DNQ	CLT	TAL	ATL; 5				6th	4350	
1999	Ken Schrader Racing	99	Chevy	DAY	ATL	SLM; DNQ	AND	CLT; 15	MCH; 39	POC												CLT; DNQ	TAL; DNQ						15th	2830	
1999	Team Rensi Motorsports	83	Chevy								TOL; 8	SBS; 5	BLN; 9	POC; 4	KIL; 5	FRS; 6	FLM; 5	ISF; 9	WIN; 17	DSF; 1	SLM; 3								15th	2830	
1999	Jack Bowsher & Associates	21	Ford																					ATL; 10					15th	2830	
2000	Jeff Finley	82	Chevy	DAY; DNQ	SLM; 13	AND; DNQ	CLT; DNQ	KIL; DNQ	FRS; DNQ	MCH	POC	TOL	KEN	BLN	POC														42nd	740	
2000	Jeff Finley	21	Chevy				CLT; 17																						42nd	740	
2000	John Bailey	70	Chevy													WIN; 5	ISF	KEN	DSF	SLM; 6	CLT	TAL	ATL						42nd	740	
2001	John Bailey	70	Chevy	DAY	NSH	WIN; 2	SLM; 3	GTY	KEN	CLT	KAN												SLM; 7		BLN; 4	CLT	TAL	ATL	34th	1225	
2001	John Bailey	70	Pontiac									MCH; 11	POC	MEM	GLN	KEN	MCH	POC	NSH	ISF	CHI	DSF							34th	1225	
2001	Steele Racing	16	Chevy																					TOL; 4					34th	1225	
2002	John Bailey	70	Chevy	DAY	ATL	NSH	SLM	KEN	CLT	KAN	POC	MCH	TOL; 16	SBO	KEN	BLN	POC	NSH	ISF	WIN	DSF	CHI	SLM	TAL	CLT				131st	150	
