= Wayne Grubb =

American racing driver (born 1976)

- Born: July 19, 1976 (age 50); Mechanicsville, Virginia, U.S.

NASCAR O'Reilly Auto Parts Series career
- 52 races run over 4 years
- Best finish: 36th (1998)
- First race: 1997 United Cellular 200 (Loudon)
- Last race: 2000 Dura Lube/All Pro Bumper to Bumper 200 (Darlington)
Wins	Top tens	Poles
0	3	1

NASCAR FedEx Freight Truck Series career
- 7 races run over 2 years
- Best finish: 49th (1997)
- First race: 1996 Fas Mart Supertruck Shootout (Richmond)
- Last race: 1997 The No Fear Challenge (Fontana)
Wins	Top tens	Poles
0	0	0
- Statistics up to date as of November 26, 2012.

For the American former football- and baseball coach, see Wayne Grubb (American football).

Wayne Grubb (born July 19, 1976) is an American former NASCAR driver and crew chief for GC Motorsports International. He ran 52 NASCAR Busch Series races and seven Craftsman Truck Series races before he retired late in the 2000 season. He is the older brother of former NASCAR driver Kevin Grubb, who died on May 6, 2009, at age 31. Grubb was born in Mechanicsville, Virginia.

== Busch Series career ==
In 1997, Grubb made some laps as he was getting ready for a Rookie of the Year run in 1998. His debut came at New Hampshire International Speedway, driving his family-owned to 35th on the starting grid. He was making his way through the field in his No. 83 Chevy, but an engine failure put him 36th on the final rundown. He ran at South Boston Speedway next, finishing 25th with engine problems, despite his first top-ten qualifying effort of eighth. His potential showed, however, when after qualifying 31st at Indianapolis Raceway Park, he drove through the field, led 28 laps, and finished fifth, his first career top-ten finish.

In 1998, Grubb had a decent rookie run. He had an average start of 17.8 and an average finish of 22.5. Grubb secured his best weekend of his career when he secured his first career pole in the spring race at Richmond International Raceway. He led three laps in that race, and finished a career-best fourth place. Grubb also finished seventh at Bristol Motor Speedway. He also had an outside pole at South Boston and a fifth place qualifying effort at New Hampshire to his credit. However, he often DNQed and the budget was tight, only competing in half the races and finishing 36th in the points.

In 1999, Grubb had a disappointing year. He had no top-ten runs or qualifying efforts. He only ran seventeen of 32 races. His average start was 28th and average finish of 31st. Once again, his best weekend of the year came at Richmond in September. He qualified and finished in fifteenth. He had two other top-twenty runs: fifteenth at Gateway and seventeenth at South Boston. He ended 45th in points

Things did not get any better in 2000. His average finish was 29th. Even with an eighth place start at IRP and a fifth place at Darlington, Grubb finished his Busch Series career at Darlington with a 32nd-place finish. He gave the car over to Brandon Butler, watched his team finish out 2000, and then dismantled it due to lack of sponsorship before 2001. Grubb ran fifteen races in 2000 and finished 40th in points.

In his Busch Series career, Grubb had one pole, two top-fives, three top-tens and his best finish in a race was fourth (Richmond 1998). His best points finish was 1998 in 36th.

== Craftsman Truck Series ==
Before Grubb was racing in the Busch series, he was actually making some races in the Craftsman Truck Series, driving the #4 Chevy in seven races during 1996 and 1997.

Grubb made his debut in the 1996 race at Richmond. He qualified a solid thirteenth, but became involved in an accident, and he finished that race a disappointing 32nd. Grubb also ran in 1996 at Martinsville, finishing a solid eighteenth after starting deep in the pack. This would end up being his best Craftsman Truck finish.

After those two races in 1996, Grubb added five more to his resume in 1997. He finished 36th at New Hampshire, 27th twice at Louisville and Martinsville, 23rd at Richmond, and a 22nd at Fontana. He finished the year 49th in points.

== Motorsports career results ==
=== NASCAR ===
(key) (Bold – Pole position awarded by qualifying time. Italics – Pole position earned by points standings or practice time. * – Most laps led.)

==== Busch Series ====
NASCAR Busch Series Grand National Division results
Year	Team	No.	Make	1	2	3	4	5	6	7	8	9	10	11	12	13	14	15	16	17	18	19	20	21	22	23	24	25	26	27	28	29	30	31	32	NBSC	Pts	Ref
1997	Grubb Motorsports	83	Chevy	DAY	CAR	RCH; DNQ	ATL	LVS	DAR	HCY; DNQ	TEX	BRI	NSV	TAL	NHA; 36	NZH	CLT	DOV	SBO; 25	GLN	MLW	MYB	GTY	IRP; 5	MCH	BRI	DAR	RCH; DNQ	DOV	CLT	CAL	CAR	HOM; 28			62nd	377	
1998	Grubb Motorsports	83	Chevy	DAY	CAR	LVS; 36	NSV; 23	DAR	BRI	TEX; 41	HCY	TAL	NHA; 18	NZH; 21	CLT	DOV	**RCH**; 4	PPR; 15	GLN	MLW; 25	MYB	CAL; 13	SBO; 24	IRP; 19	MCH; 21	BRI; 7	DAR	RCH; 39	DOV	CLT; DNQ	GTY; 20	CAR	ATL	HOM; 34		36th	1546	
1999	Grubb Motorsports	83	Chevy	DAY; DNQ	CAR; 30	LVS; DNQ	ATL; 32	DAR	TEX	NSV	BRI	TAL; 38	CAL	NHA; DNQ	RCH; 40	NZH; DNQ	CLT; 30	DOV; 38	SBO; 17	GLN	MLW; 38	MYB; 32	PPR; 42	GTY; 15	IRP; 30	MCH; DNQ	BRI; 31	DAR; 43	RCH; 15	DOV; 23	CLT; DNQ	CAR	MEM; 34	PHO	HOM; DNQ	45th	1187	
2000	Grubb Motorsports	83	Chevy	DAY; 41	CAR; DNQ	LVS; 23	ATL; 20	DAR; DNQ	BRI; 29	TEX; 21	NSV	TAL	CAL	RCH; 39	NHA; DNQ	CLT; DNQ	DOV; 22	SBO; 43	MYB; 20	GLN	MLW; 29	NZH; 32	PPR; 15	GTY; 24	IRP; 39	MCH	BRI; DNQ	DAR; 32	RCH; DNQ	DOV	CLT	CAR	MEM	PHO	HOM	40th	1158	

==== Craftsman Truck Series ====
NASCAR Craftsman Truck Series results
Year	Team	No.	Make	1	2	3	4	5	6	7	8	9	10	11	12	13	14	15	16	17	18	19	20	21	22	23	24	25	26	NCTC	Pts	Ref
1996	Grubb Motorsports	4	Chevy	HOM	PHO	POR	EVG	TUS	CNS	HPT	BRI	NZH	MLW	LVL	I70	IRP	FLM	GLN	NSV	RCH; 32	NHA	MAR; 18	NWS	SON	MMR	PHO	LVS			78th	176	
1997	Grubb Motorsports	4	Chevy	WDW	TUS	HOM	PHO	POR	EVG	I70	NHA; 36	TEX	BRI	NZH	MLW	LVL; 27	CNS	HPT	IRP	FLM	NSV	GLN	RCH; 23	MAR; 27	SON	MMR	CAL; 22	PHO	LVS	49th	410	

=== CARS Super Late Model Tour ===
(key)

CARS Super Late Model Tour results
Year	Team	No.	Make	1	2	3	4	5	6	7	8	CSLMTC	Pts	Ref
2019	N/A	4G	Chevy	SNM	HCY	NSH; 27	MMS	BRI	HCY	ROU	SBO	N/A	0	
