= J. D. Gibbs =

American racing driver (1969–2019)

- Born: Jason Dean Gibbs; February 21, 1969; Los Angeles, California, U.S.
- Died: January 11, 2019 (aged 49); Davidson, North Carolina, U.S.
- Awards: West Coast Stock Car Hall of Fame (2019)

NASCAR O'Reilly Auto Parts Series career
- 5 races run over 2 years
- 1999 position: 130th
- Best finish: 64th (1998)
- First race: 1998 Diamond Hill Plywood 200 (Darlington)
- Last race: 1999 Alltel 200 (Rockingham)
Wins	Top tens	Poles
0	0	0

NASCAR FedEx Freight Truck Series career
- 8 races run over 3 years
- 2002 position: 93rd
- Best finish: 49th (2000)
- First race: 2000 Quaker State 200 (Memphis)
- Last race: 2002 Craftsman Anniversary 200 (Darlington)
Wins	Top tens	Poles
0	0	0
- Statistics up to date as of January 11, 2019.

Jason Dean Gibbs (February 21, 1969 – January 11, 2019) was an American professional stock car racing driver and co-owner of Joe Gibbs Racing. He also played college football at the College of William & Mary.

== Early life and education ==
J. D. Gibbs was born on February 21, 1969, near Los Angeles, California. At the time his father, Joe Gibbs, was the assistant coach at the University of Southern California. His mother is the former Patricia Escobar. During Gibbs' childhood, he moved several times before settling in Washington, D.C. He attended and graduated from Oakton High School in Vienna, Virginia.

Gibbs then attended the College of William & Mary in Williamsburg, Virginia, where he was a defensive back and quarterback for the William & Mary Tribe during the 1987 to 1990 seasons, while his father coached for the Washington Redskins. He helped the school team to two Division I Football Championship Subdivision (formerly Division I-AA) playoff appearances; the team won ten games in his senior season.

== Racing career ==
In July 1991, after college, he became employed with Joe Gibbs Racing, a team his father started in July 1991. The team, with only six employees, started racing with Dale Jarrett as the driver in 1992.

In 1993, Gibbs was a tire changer on the team and was part of the 1993 Daytona 500 winning team. In the mid-1990s, he started racing in the NASCAR Camping World East Series, as well as late-model events in North Carolina. Afterward, he started racing in the Craftsman Truck Series and Busch Series.

In 1998, Gibbs became president of his father's team. After being the president for six years, his father returned to the Redskins after a 12-year hiatus. In 2007, he was rejoined with his father, once he retired for the second time.

== Personal life ==
Gibbs married his wife Melissa (née Miller), and they had four sons, Joe Jackson, William Miller, Jason Dean II, and Zachary Taylor. He was a major contributor and former member of Young Life, a non-denominational Christian organization for adolescents and he was honored with Young Life's Posthumous Alumni Achievement Award. As a tribute to his legacy, in 2025, Joe Gibbs Racing partnered with Young Life to introduce the number 19 Young Life NASCAR Xfinity racecar, driven by Aric Almirola.

== Illness and death ==
In May 2015, it was announced that Gibbs was battling "conditions related to brain function". Over the ensuing years, his public appearances and involvement in the team became less frequent as the symptoms slowly began to show. He died at his home in Davidson, North Carolina, on January 11, 2019.

A memorial service was held at Davidson College's John M. Belk Arena on January 25, 2019, where he was eulogized by his wife Melissa, his father, his brother Coy, and his best friends Dave Alpern and Moose Valliere.

== Motorsports career results ==
=== NASCAR ===
(key) (Bold – Pole position awarded by qualifying time. Italics – Pole position earned by points standings or practice time. * – Most laps led.)

==== Busch Series ====
NASCAR Busch Series results
Year	Team	No.	Make	1	2	3	4	5	6	7	8	9	10	11	12	13	14	15	16	17	18	19	20	21	22	23	24	25	26	27	28	29	30	31	32	NBSC	Pts	Ref
1997	Joe Gibbs Racing	42	Pontiac	DAY	CAR	RCH	ATL	LVS	DAR	HCY	TEX	BRI	NSV	TAL	NHA	NZH	CLT	DOV	SBO	GLN	MLW	MYB	GTY	IRP	MCH	BRI	DAR	RCH	DOV	CLT	CAL	CAR; DNQ	HOM			N/A	-	
1998	Joe Gibbs Racing	42	Pontiac	DAY	CAR; DNQ	LVS	NSV																									CAR; DNQ	ATL	HOM		64th	203	
1998	Joe Gibbs Racing	42	Chevy					DAR; 29	BRI	TEX	HCY	TAL	NHA	NZH	CLT	DOV	RCH; DNQ	PPR							MCH; DNQ	BRI	DAR	RCH; DNQ	DOV	CLT	GTY; DNQ					64th	203	
1998	Joe Gibbs Racing	44	Chevy																GLN; 31	MLW	MYB	CAL; 36	SBO; 20	IRP												64th	203	
1999	Joe Gibbs Racing	18	Pontiac	DAY	CAR; 41	LVS	ATL; DNQ	DAR	TEX	NSV; DNQ	BRI	TAL	CAL	NHA	RCH	NZH; DNQ	CLT	DOV	SBO																	130th	40	
1999	Joe Gibbs Racing	8	Pontiac																	GLN; DNQ	MLW	MYB	PPR	GTY	IRP	MCH	BRI	DAR	RCH	DOV	CLT	CAR				130th	40	
1999	Joe Gibbs Racing	42	Pontiac																														MEM; DNQ	PHO	HOM	130th	40	

==== Craftsman Truck Series ====
NASCAR Craftsman Truck Series results
Year	Team	No.	Make	1	2	3	4	5	6	7	8	9	10	11	12	13	14	15	16	17	18	19	20	21	22	23	24	NCTC	Pts	Ref
2000	Joe Gibbs Racing	20	Chevy	DAY	HOM	PHO	MMR	MAR	PIR	GTY	MEM; 28	PPR	EVG	TEX	KEN	GLN; 31	MLW	NHA	NZH	MCH; 30	IRP	NSV; 24	CIC		DOV; 26	TEX	CAL	49th	444	
2000	Joe Gibbs Racing	48	Chevy																					RCH; DNQ				49th	444	
2001	Joe Gibbs Racing	48	Chevy	DAY	HOM	MMR	MAR	GTY	DAR; 23	PPR	DOV	TEX	MEM	MLW	KAN	KEN	NHA	IRP	NSH	CIC	NZH	RCH; 36	SBO	TEX	LVS	PHO	CAL	81st	149	
2002	Joe Gibbs Racing	48	Chevy	DAY	DAR; 31	MAR	GTY	PPR	DOV	TEX	MEM	MLW	KAN	KEN	NHA	MCH	IRP	NSH	RCH	TEX	SBO	LVS	CAL	PHO	HOM			93rd	70	
