= Glenn Allen Jr. =

American stock car racing driver

- Born: September 24, 1970 (age 56); Cincinnati, Ohio, U.S.
- Awards: 1996 NBS Rookie of the Year

NASCAR O'Reilly Auto Parts Series career
- 113 races run over 7 years
- Best finish: 11th (1998)
- First race: 1992 Autolite 200 (Richmond)
- Last race: 2000 MBNA Platinum 200 (Dover)
Wins	Top tens	Poles
0	17	0

Glenn Allen Jr. (born September 24, 1970) is an American co-owner of Allen-Hock Motorsports, an American Speed Association (ASA) team. He is a former auto racer, participating in both the ASA and the NASCAR Busch Series during his career, and earning the 1996 NBS Rookie of the Year award.

== Career ==
=== Busch Series ===
Allen participated in two Busch Series races from 1992 to 1995 before becoming a full-time driver in 1996. Other than Mike Dillon, he was the only rookie to participate in all 26 events that year, and had two top-ten finishes. His 14th-place finish in the standings earned him the Rookie of the Year award. His best year came in 1998, when he had seven top-tens and finished 11th in the points.

Afterwards, Allen joined Akins Motorsports to drive the No. 38 Ford Taurus in 1999. However, he struggled, finishing in the top twenty only five times in seventeen races, and was replaced by Hut Stricklin. Afterwards, Allen started in six races in the 2000 season, five of them for Felix Sabates. Failing to finish in the top twenty-five once, he was released.

=== ASA ===
After being released by Sabates, Allen went back to the ASA. Racing for Bud Gebben, he raced in ten events, finishing in the top-ten nine times. Nevertheless, he did not get a full-time ride, and appeared sparingly throughout the 2001 season. He served as a crew chief for Russ Tuttle in the 2002 season. Allen, who still was interested in racing, made a deal with Ed Hock in 2003 to drive in the ASA Series cars.

Later, Allen became the team manager for Kris Stump Motorsports. In 2006, he teamed up with Hock to create Allen-Hock Motorsports, which houses cars for Stump, Brent Downey and Tony Rosebrugh.

== Motorsports career results ==
=== NASCAR ===
(key) (Bold – Pole position awarded by qualifying time. Italics – Pole position earned by points standings or practice time. * – Most laps led.)

==== Busch Series ====
NASCAR Busch Series results
Year	Team	No.	Make	1	2	3	4	5	6	7	8	9	10	11	12	13	14	15	16	17	18	19	20	21	22	23	24	25	26	27	28	29	30	31	32	NBSC	Pts	Ref
1992	Laughlin Racing	45	Olds	DAY	CAR	RCH	ATL	MAR	DAR	BRI	HCY	LAN	DUB	NZH	CLT	DOV	ROU	MYB	GLN	VOL	NHA	TAL	IRP	ROU	MCH	NHA	BRI	DAR	RCH; 34	DOV	CLT	MAR	CAR	HCY		126th	117	
1995	RaDiUs Motorsports	66	Ford	DAY	CAR	RCH	ATL	NSV	DAR	BRI	HCY	NHA	NZH	CLT	DOV	MYB	GLN	MLW	TAL; 29	SBO	IRP	MCH	BRI	DAR	RCH	DOV	CLT; DNQ	CAR								97th	76	
1995	RaDiUs Motorsports	97	Chevy																										HOM; DNQ							97th	76	
1996	J&J Racing	99	Chevy	DAY; 33	CAR; 16	RCH; 12	ATL; 17	NSV; 7	DAR; 15	BRI; 11	HCY; 15	NZH; 10	CLT; 27	DOV; 36	SBO; 19	MYB; 19	GLN; 26	MLW; 38	NHA; 28	TAL; 17	IRP; 16	MCH; 23	BRI; 17	DAR; 35	RCH; 14	DOV; 22	CLT; 42	CAR; 17	HOM; 18							14th	2593	
1997	J&J Racing	99	Chevy	DAY; 31	CAR; 9	RCH; 25	ATL; 41	LVS; 9	DAR; 22	HCY; 24	TEX; 37	BRI; 18	NSV; 35	TAL; 33	NHA; 25	NZH; 16	CLT; DNQ	DOV; 25	SBO; 21	GLN; 29	MLW; 16	MYB; 7	GTY; 14	IRP; 13	MCH; 15	BRI; 37	DAR; 11	RCH; 24	DOV; 8	CLT; 17	CAL; 7	CAR; 21	HOM; 4			16th	2969	
1998	J&J Racing	99	Chevy	DAY; 30	CAR; 29	LVS; 17	NSV; 15	DAR; 22	BRI; 9	TEX; 22	HCY; 15	TAL; 6	NHA; 6	NZH; 9	CLT; 28	DOV; 18	RCH; 27	PPR; 23	GLN; 19	MLW; 22	MYB; 30	CAL; 18	SBO; 14	IRP; 27	MCH; 27	BRI; 26	DAR; 21	RCH; 9	DOV; 18	CLT; 22	GTY; 10	CAR; 16	ATL; 43	HOM; 8		11th	3270	
1999	Akins-Sutton Motorsports	38	Ford	DAY; 16	CAR; DNQ	LVS; DNQ	ATL; 9	DAR; 30	TEX; 27	NSV; 29	BRI; 26		CAL; 21	NHA; 28	RCH; 26	NZH; 14	CLT; DNQ	DOV; 24	SBO; DNQ	GLN; 29	MLW; 4	MYB; DNQ	PPR; 37	GTY; 33	IRP; 24	MCH; DNQ	BRI; DNQ	DAR								32nd	1692	
1999	Akins-Sutton Motorsports	38	Chevy									TAL; 13																								32nd	1692	
1999	Galaxy Motorsports	40	Chevy																										RCH; 42	DOV; 40	CLT	CAR	MEM	PHO	HOM	32nd	1692	
2000	J&J Racing	99	Chevy	DAY; DNQ	CAR																															67th	384	
2000	Labonte Motorsports	44	Chevy			LVS; 33	ATL	DAR	BRI	TEX	NSV	TAL																								67th	384	
2000	SABCO Racing	82	Chevy										CAL; 31	RCH; 40	NHA; 31	CLT; 29	DOV; 34	SBO	MYB	GLN	MLW	NZH	PPR	GTY	IRP	MCH	BRI	DAR	RCH	DOV	CLT	CAR	MEM	PHO	HOM	67th	384	

==== Busch North Series ====
NASCAR Busch North Series results
Year	Team	No.	Make	1	2	3	4	5	6	7	8	9	10	11	12	13	14	15	16	17	18	19	20	21	NBNSC	Pts	Ref
1996	J&J Racing	99	Chevy	DAY	LEE	JEN	NZH	HOL	NHA; 7	TIO	BEE	TMP	NZH	NHA	STA	GLN	EPP	RPS	LEE	NHA	NHA	BEE	TMP	LRP	77th	146	
