= Joe Buford =

American racing driver

- Born: Joe Calvin Buford; June 19, 1967 (age 59); Franklin, Tennessee, U.S.
- Achievements: 1998, 1999, 2000, 2002 Fairgrounds Speedway Track Champion; 1998 Heartland Region Champion; Most career victories at Fairgrounds Speedway (66 wins)
- Awards: 1991 Fairgrounds Speedway Rookie of the Year; Fairgrounds Speedway Hall of Fame (2009)

NASCAR O'Reilly Auto Parts Series career
- 18 races run over 4 years
- Best finish: 52nd (2002)
- First race: 1998 CARQUEST Auto Parts 250 (Gateway)
- Last race: 2003 Trace Adkins Chrome 300 (Nashville)
Wins	Top tens	Poles
0	0	0

NASCAR FedEx Freight Truck Series career
- 3 races run over 2 years
- Best finish: 73rd (1998)
- First race: 1997 Federated Auto Parts 250 (Nashville)
- Last race: 1998 Federated Auto Parts 250 (Nashville)
Wins	Top tens	Poles
0	0	0
- Statistics up to date as of July 17, 2020.

Joseph Buford (born June 19, 1967) is an American former professional stock car racing driver.

== Racing career ==
Buford began his career at Duck River Speedway in 1989. He took his father's advice (two-time Nashville Speedway USA champ James "Flookie" Buford) and started racing at Nashville in 1991. He was an instant success, winning three races and the "Rookie of the Year" honors. He moved to the premier late model division in 1992. Buford was a four-time track champion at the historic track (1998, 1999, 2000, 2002), tying Coo Coo Marlin for the most titles in track history. His 66 victories passed the long-standing Darrell Waltrip record of 55 career victories at the track. He was the 1998 Heartland Region Champion (missing the national title by only a 1/2 point). He finished second in the Heartland Region in 1999 and 2000.

Buford won two NASCAR Southern Division races. He finished third in his first NASCAR Goody's Dash Series race. He also raced in the All-Pro Series. Buford started three Craftsman Truck Series and 18 Busch Series races with little success.

The total amount of races that Buford entered were 39. During his career, he had a race win percentage of 17.9%. He won seven races in total. His strongest year (career wise) was 2000. He entered eighteen races and won seven in 2000.

== Motorsports career results ==
=== NASCAR ===
(key) (Bold – Pole position awarded by qualifying time. Italics – Pole position earned by points standings or practice time. * – Most laps led.)

==== Busch Series ====
NASCAR Busch Series results
Year	Team	No.	Make	1	2	3	4	5	6	7	8	9	10	11	12	13	14	15	16	17	18	19	20	21	22	23	24	25	26	27	28	29	30	31	32	33	34	NBSC	Pts	Ref
1998	Washington-Erving Motorsports	50	Ford	DAY	CAR	LVS	NSV	DAR	BRI	TEX	HCY	TAL	NHA	NZH	CLT	DOV	RCH	PPR	GLN	MLW	MYB	CAL	SBO	IRP	MCH	BRI	DAR	RCH	DOV	CLT	GTY; 42	CAR	ATL	HOM				120th	37	
1999	Whitaker Racing	7	Chevy	DAY	CAR	LVS; DNQ	ATL	DAR	TEX; DNQ		BRI; 43	TAL	CAL	NHA	RCH	NZH	CLT; DNQ	DOV	SBO	GLN	MLW	MYB	PPR	GTY	IRP	MCH	BRI; 26	DAR	RCH	DOV					HOM; DNQ			82nd	231	
1999	James Buford	67	Ford							NSV; 17																							MEM; DNQ	PHO				82nd	231	
1999	Sadler Brothers Racing	95	Chevy																												CLT; DNQ	CAR						82nd	231	
2000	James Buford	67	Ford	DAY	CAR	LVS	ATL	DAR	BRI	TEX	NSV	TAL; DNQ	CAL	RCH	NHA	CLT	DOV	SBO	MYB	GLN	MLW	NZH	PPR	GTY	IRP	MCH	BRI	DAR	RCH	DOV	CLT	CAR	MEM	PHO	HOM			N/A	0	
2002	Jay Robinson Racing	49	Ford	DAY	CAR	LVS	DAR; 43	BRI; 37	TEX	NSH	TAL	CAL	RCH	NHA	NZH	CLT	DOV	NSH; 29	KEN	MLW	DAY	CHI	GTY	PPR	IRP	MCH				DOV; 31	KAN; 35	CLT; 36	MEM; 35	ATL; 30	CAR; 41	PHO; 26	HOM; 40	52nd	649	
2002	Brian Weber & Associates Racing	84	Chevy																								BRI; DNQ	DAR	RCH									52nd	649	
2003	Brian Weber & Associates Racing	84	Chevy	DAY; DNQ																																		104th	153	
2003	Jay Robinson Racing	39	Ford		CAR; 41	LVS	DAR																															104th	153	
2003	Tennessee Mountain Boys Racing	53	Pontiac					BRI; 35	TEX	TAL								NSH; 36	KEN	MLW	DAY	CHI	NHA	PPR	IRP	MCH	BRI	DAR	RCH	DOV	KAN	CLT	MEM	ATL	PHO	CAR	HOM	104th	153	
2003	Long Brothers Racing	8	Ford								NSH; DNQ	CAL	RCH	GTY	NZH	CLT	DOV																					104th	153	
2004	Tennessee Mountain Boys Racing	53	Pontiac	DAY	CAR	LVS	DAR	BRI	TEX	NSH	TAL	CAL	GTY	RCH	NZH	CLT	DOV	NSH; DNQ	KEN	MLW	DAY	CHI	NHA	PPR	IRP	MCH	BRI; DNQ	CAL	RCH	DOV	KAN	CLT	MEM; DNQ	ATL	PHO	DAR	HOM	N/A	0	

==== Craftsman Truck Series ====
NASCAR Craftsman Truck Series results
Year	Team	No.	Make	1	2	3	4	5	6	7	8	9	10	11	12	13	14	15	16	17	18	19	20	21	22	23	24	25	26	27	NCTC	Pts	Ref
1997	Buford Racing	70	Ford	WDW	TUS	HOM	PHO	POR	EVG	I70	NHA	TEX	BRI; DNQ	NZH	MLW	LVL	CNS	HPT	IRP	FLM	NSV; 18	GLN	RCH; DNQ	MAR	SON	MMR	CAL	PHO	LVS		82nd	189	
1998	Buford Racing	70	Ford	WDW	HOM	PHO	POR	EVG	I70	GLN	TEX	BRI; 23	MLW	NZH	CAL	PPR	IRP	NHA	FLM	NSV; 32	HPT	LVL	RCH	MEM	GTY	MAR	SON	MMR	PHO	LVS	73rd	161	
2000	Steve Stevenson	11	Chevy	DAY; DNQ	HOM	PHO	MMR	MAR	PIR	GTY	MEM	PPR	EVG	TEX	KEN	GLN	MLW	NHA	NZH	MCH	IRP	NSV	CIC	RCH	DOV	TEX	CAL				N/A	0	

==== Goody's Dash Series ====
NASCAR Goody's Dash Series results
Year	Team	No.	Make	1	2	3	4	5	6	7	8	9	10	11	12	13	14	15	16	NGDS	Pts	Ref
1999	N/A	11	Ford	DAY; 3	HCY	CAR														N/A	0	
1999	N/A	99	Pontiac				CLT; 42	BRI	LOU	SUM	GRE	ROU	STA	MYB	HCY	LAN	USA	JAC	LAN	N/A	0	

=== ARCA Bondo/Mar-Hyde Series ===
(key) (Bold – Pole position awarded by qualifying time. Italics – Pole position earned by points standings or practice time. * – Most laps led.)

ARCA Bondo/Mar-Hyde Series results
Year	Team	No.	Make	1	2	3	4	5	6	7	8	9	10	11	12	13	14	15	16	17	18	19	20	21	ABMHSC	Pts	Ref
1999	Sadler Brothers Racing	95	Chevy	DAY	ATL	SLM	AND	CLT	MCH	POC	TOL	SBS	BLN	POC	KIL	FRS	FLM	ISF	WIN	DSF	SLM	CLT; 23	TAL	ATL	123rd	115	
