= Lyndon Amick =

American racing driver (born 1977)

- Born: June 30, 1977 (age 49); Saluda, South Carolina, U.S.
- Spouse: Melanie Amick
- Children: Billy Amick
- Military career
- Allegiance: United States
- Branch: South Carolina Army National Guard
- Service years: 2003–2011
- Rank: Sergeant
- Units: Bravo Company, 1st Battalion, 118th Infantry Regiment
- Conflicts: Operation Enduring Freedom
- Achievements: 1996 NASCAR Goody's Dash Series Champion

NASCAR O'Reilly Auto Parts Series career
- 93 races run over 7 years
- Best finish: 28th (2000)
- First race: 1997 Gargoyles 300 (Daytona)
- Last race: 2003 Aaron's 312 (Talladega)
Wins	Top tens	Poles
0	10	0

NASCAR FedEx Freight Truck Series career
- 4 races run over 2 years
- Best finish: 63rd (2000)
- First race: 2000 Daytona 250 (Daytona)
- Last race: 2001 Federated Auto Parts 200 (Nashville)
Wins	Top tens	Poles
0	2	0
- Statistics up to date as of January 15, 2012.

Lyndon Amick (born June 30, 1977) is an American former NASCAR driver. He spent most of his NASCAR career in the NASCAR Busch Series driving for his family-owned team.

== Racing career ==
Amick was the 1996 NASCAR Goody's Dash series champion. Amick made his NASCAR Busch Series debut in 1997, driving the No. 35 Pontiac Grand Prix owned by his father, Bill. Despite sharing the same last name, his father wasn't the Bill Amick who have raced in the NASCAR Winston West Series. He had sponsorship from Rockwell Automation and ran fifteen races. Amick made his first career start in the 1997 race at Daytona International Speedway. He started in the 37th position in the 45-car field, but finished 44th after a multi-car crash on lap 28 forced him out of the race early. Out of the rest of the races he ran that season, he only managed a best finish of fifteenth at IRP and only had two other top-twenty finishes. His best start was a twelfth at the fall race at Darlington. After his rookie run, Amick made a dozen starts in 1998. In back to back starts, Amick earned a fourth at Myrtle Beach and an eighth at South Boston. In his return to IRP, Amick also earned a third place starting position. He ended the season in 45th place in points.

In nineteen starts in 1999, Amick received sponsorship from SCANA Pontiac, Amick recorded three top-tens including a fifth. Also, Amick matched his best career start of third at Las Vegas. Amick made his first full-time run in 2000. Amick had three top-tens, with a best finish of ninth at Richmond, and finished 28th in points. That same year, Amick made his Craftsman Truck Series debut with Ken Schrader Racing in the inaugural race at Daytona. He started third and ran well. He was seventh on lap 56, but finished 22nd after a fiery crash with Geoff Bodine. Amick returned at IRP, starting thirteenth, and leading seven laps before finishing second, barely losing to Joe Ruttman.

After losing sponsor SCANA, Amick ran six races in 2001. He earned a seventh at Watkins Glen International Raceway, but suffered two crashes and one engine failure. He also drove in two more Truck races for Schrader, finishing ninth at Daytona.

In 2002, Amick began the season in the No. 26 Dr Pepper Chevy full-time for Carroll Racing. He managed a best finish of fourteenth at Rockingham, and after ten races and a 31st at Richmond, Amick was released in favor of Ron Hornaday Jr. Amick's best weekend was a one-race deal with ppc Racing at Kansas. He started twelfth and ran well to a ninth-place finish. Amick's final start came at Talladega in 2003, when he leased a car from Braun Racing and finished 36th after an early crash.

== Military career ==
In May 2003, Amick enlisted in the South Carolina Army National Guard, in which he was a sergeant with the Bravo Company of the 1st Battalion, 118th Infantry Regiment. In 2007, he was deployed in combat during Operation Enduring Freedom in Afghanistan.

== Personal life ==
Amick is the father of professional baseball player Billy Amick.

== Motorsports career results ==
=== NASCAR ===
(key) (Bold – Pole position awarded by qualifying time. Italics – Pole position earned by points standings or practice time. * – Most laps led.)

==== Busch Series ====
NASCAR Busch Series results
Year	Team	No.	Make	1	2	3	4	5	6	7	8	9	10	11	12	13	14	15	16	17	18	19	20	21	22	23	24	25	26	27	28	29	30	31	32	33	34	NBSC	Pts	Ref
1996	Team Amick	33	Chevy	DAY	CAR	RCH	ATL	NSV	DAR	BRI	HCY	NZH	CLT	DOV	SBO	MYB	GLN	MLW	NHA	TAL	IRP	MCH	BRI	DAR	RCH	DOV	CLT	CAR; DNQ	HOM									NA	-	
1997	Team Amick	35	Pontiac	DAY; 44	CAR	RCH	ATL; 35	LVS	DAR; 38	HCY	TEX; 40	BRI; DNQ	NSV; 20	TAL	NHA	NZH	CLT	DOV	SBO	GLN; 24	MLW; 32	MYB	GTY; 28	IRP; 15	MCH; DNQ	BRI; 23		RCH; DNQ	DOV; 17	CLT; 35	CAL; 29	CAR; 36	HOM; DNQ					42nd	1110	
1997	Team Amick	35	Chevy																								DAR; 29											42nd	1110	
1998	Team Amick	35	Pontiac	DAY; DNQ	CAR; 26	LVS; DNQ	NSV; 35	DAR; 16	BRI; DNQ	TEX	HCY	TAL; 33	NHA	NZH	CLT; DNQ	DOV	RCH; 22	PPR	GLN	MLW	MYB; 4	CAL	SBO; 9	IRP; 22	MCH; DNQ	BRI; DNQ	DAR; 43	RCH; 31	DOV; 27		GTY; 41			HOM; DNQ				45th	1045	
1998	Team Amick	35	Chevy																											CLT; DNQ		CAR; DNQ	ATL; DNQ					45th	1045	
1999	Team Amick	35	Chevy	DAY; 29	CAR; 37	LVS; 43	ATL; 29	DAR; DNQ	TEX; 41	NSV; DNQ	BRI; 41	TAL; 5	CAL; 9	NHA; 26	RCH; 43	NZH; 37	CLT; DNQ	DOV; DNQ	SBO; 19	GLN	MLW	MYB; 24	PPR; 32	GTY; DNQ	IRP; 21	MCH	BRI			DOV; 27	CLT	CAR	MEM; 10	PHO; 28	HOM; 42			34th	1483	
1999	Team Amick	88	Chevy																									DAR; DNQ	RCH									34th	1483	
2000	Team Amick	35	Chevy	DAY; DNQ	CAR; 10	LVS; 37	ATL; 15	DAR; 10	BRI; 19	TEX; 33	NSV; 43	TAL; 35	CAL; 11	RCH; 9	NHA; 37	CLT; 11	DOV; 35	SBO; 16	MYB; 16	GLN; 38	MLW; 34	NZH; 41	PPR; 23	GTY; 39	IRP; 43	MCH; 38	BRI; 17	DAR; 40	RCH; 35	DOV; 39	CLT; 35	CAR; DNQ	MEM; 30	PHO; 36	HOM; DNQ			28th	2266	
2001	Team Amick	35	Pontiac	DAY; 21	CAR	LVS	ATL	DAR	BRI	TEX	NSH																											57th	493	
2001	Team Amick	35	Chevy									TAL; 30	CAL	RCH; 43	NHA	NZH	CLT	DOV	KEN	MLW	GLN; 7	CHI	GTY	PPR	IRP	MCH	BRI	DAR; 21	RCH; 41	DOV	KAN	CLT	MEM	PHO	CAR	HOM		57th	493	
2002	Carroll Racing	26	Pontiac	DAY; 19			DAR; 41				TAL; 25																											44th	960	
2002	Carroll Racing	26	Chevy		CAR; 14	LVS; 30		BRI; 22	TEX; 41	NSH; 28		CAL; 20	RCH; 31	NHA	NZH	CLT	DOV	NSH	KEN	MLW	DAY	CHI	GTY	PPR	IRP	MCH	BRI	DAR	RCH	DOV								44th	960	
2002	ppc Racing	15	Ford																												KAN; 9	CLT	MEM					44th	960	
2002	ppc Racing	15	Pontiac																															ATL; DNQ	CAR	PHO	HOM	44th	960	
2003	Team Amick	32	Chevy	DAY	CAR	LVS	DAR	BRI	TEX	TAL; 36	NSH	CAL	RCH	GTY	NZH	CLT	DOV	NSH	KEN	MLW	DAY	CHI	NHA	PPR	IRP	MCH	BRI	DAR	RCH	DOV	KAN	CLT	MEM	ATL	PHO	CAR	HOM	141st	55	

==== Craftsman Truck Series ====
NASCAR Craftsman Truck Series results
Year	Team	No.	Make	1	2	3	4	5	6	7	8	9	10	11	12	13	14	15	16	17	18	19	20	21	22	23	24	NCTC	Pts	Ref
2000	Ken Schrader Racing	52	Chevy	DAY; 22	HOM	PHO	MMR	MAR	PIR	GTY	MEM	PPR	EVG	TEX	KEN	GLN	MLW	NHA	NZH	MCH	IRP; 2	NSV	CIC	RCH	DOV	TEX	CAL	63rd	277	
2001	Ken Schrader Racing	52	Chevy	DAY; 9	HOM	MMR	MAR	GTY	DAR	PPR	DOV	TEX	MEM	MLW	KAN	KEN	NHA	IRP	NSH; 13	CIC	NZH	RCH	SBO	TEX	LVS	PHO	CAL	65th	267	

==== Goody's Dash Series ====
NASCAR Goody's Dash Series results
Year	Team	No.	Make	1	2	3	4	5	6	7	8	9	10	11	12	13	14	15	16	17	18	19	20	21	NGDS	Pts	Ref
1994	Team Amick	33	Pontiac	DAY	VOL; 13	FLO; 10	SUM; 24	CAR; 7	411; 6	HCY; 16	LAN; 10	BRI; 11	SUM; 14	FLO; 6	BGS; 5	MYB; 4	NRV; 23	ASH; 20	VOL; 6	HCY; 7					10th	2103	
1995	Team Amick	33	Pontiac	DAY; 4	FLO; 23	LAN; 3	MYB; 2	SUM; 8	HCY; 4	CAR; 2	STH; 2	BRI; 3	SUM; 16	GRE; 5	BGS; 7	MYB; 2	NSV; 27	FLO; 3	NWS; 4	VOL; 4	HCY; 14	HOM; 39			5th	2716	
1996	Team Amick	33	Pontiac	DAY; 1*	**HOM**; 10	**MYB**; 20	SUM; 7	NSV; 5	TRI; 2*	CAR; 9	HCY; 16	FLO; 12	BRI; 1*	SUM; 1*	GRE; 21	SNM; 1	BGS; 5	MYB; 2	LAN; 3	STH; 9	FLO; 3	NWS; 3	VOL; 10	**HCY**; 2	1st	3170	

=== ARCA Re/Max Series ===
(key) (Bold – Pole position awarded by qualifying time. Italics – Pole position earned by points standings or practice time. * – Most laps led.)

ARCA Re/Max Series results
Year	Team	No.	Make	1	2	3	4	5	6	7	8	9	10	11	12	13	14	15	16	17	18	19	20	21	22	23	24	25	ARMC	Pts	Ref
2000	Ken Schrader Racing	99	Chevy	DAY; 12	SLM	AND																							38th	895	
2000	Ken Schrader Racing	99	Pontiac				CLT; 1	KIL	FRS	MCH	POC	TOL	KEN	BLN	POC	WIN	ISF	KEN	DSF	SLM	CLT; 19	TAL; 7	ATL; 14						38th	895	
2001	Ken Schrader Racing	99	Chevy	DAY	NSH	WIN	SLM	GTY	KEN	CLT	KAN	MCH	POC	MEM	GLN; 6*	KEN	MCH	POC	NSH	ISF	CHI	DSF	SLM	TOL	BLN	CLT	TAL	ATL	108th	230	

Sporting positions
Preceded by David Hutto	NASCAR Goody's Dash Series Champion; 1996	Succeeded by Mike Swaim Jr.
