= Mark Day (racing driver) =

American racing driver

- Born: September 21, 1961 (age 65); Clarksville, Tennessee
- Achievements: 2006 Music City Motorplex Track Champion; 2010, 2011, 2012, 2013 Southern Superstars Series Champion

NASCAR O'Reilly Auto Parts Series career
- 13 races run over 6 years
- Best finish: 31st (1997)
- First race: 1997 Coca-Cola 300 (Texas)
- Last race: 2009 Ford 300 (Homestead)
Wins	Top tens	Poles
0	0	0

NASCAR FedEx Freight Truck Series career
- 1 race run over 1 year
- Best finish: 31st (1996)
- First race: 1996 Federated Auto Parts 250 (Nashville)
- Last race: 1996 Federated Auto Parts 250 (Nashville)
Wins	Top tens	Poles
0	0	0
- Statistics up to date as of November 2, 2013.

Mark Alex Logan Day (born September 21, 1961) is an American former professional stock car racing driver, racing for a number of years in NASCAR's Busch and Southeast Series, as well as the ARCA Re/Max Series. In addition, his family used to own Day Enterprise Racing, which fielded entries in the Busch Series and ARCA Re/Max Series from 1989 to 2011.

== Racing career ==
=== Craftsman Truck Series ===
Day only made one career start in NASCAR's Truck Series, which came at Nashville Speedway USA (now known as the Nashville Fairgrounds Speedway) in the No. 50 R&Z Motorsports truck. He started 23rd, but only managed 31st in the 34-car field after mechanical issues.

=== Busch Series ===
Day made his debut in 1997, running five races for his family's 31-W Insulation team. He made his debut in the inaugural race at Texas, starting 37th. A mid-race wreck claimed his car and gave him a finish of 36th. It did not get much better for Day. He best finish on the year would end up being 31st at Talladega and had only a best start of 36th at Bristol. Simply put, it was not Day's dream season.

Day would scale down to one race for 1998 and for the rest of the years of his career, for that matter. He started 40th and finished 36th at Pikes Peak. He only competed fifty laps due to engine failure.

Day's one start in 1999 turned out to be just as poor. After starting 34th in the August Bristol race, Day managed 41st after a crash early in the event.

Another crash sidelined Day in his 2000 start. He started 24th at Nashville, and this would turn out to be his best career start. He only finished 40th, however, due to a major late-race crash.

Day closed out his Busch career in 2001, finishing it with two consecutive starts. He did not finish either, but ironically, Day had his best career finish in that. After a 36th finish at Texas, Day was crashed out early of the inaugural event at Nashville Superspeedway. However, it turned up to be a 31st-place finish and his best career showing.

After an eight–year hiatus from NASCAR's second-tier division, Day returned to the now-NASCAR Nationwide Series for a one-race deal in October 2009 at Memphis Motorsports Park for the Kroger On Track For The Cure 250. This was the final NASCAR Nationwide race for the Memphis Motorsports Park after announcing that the track would cease operations at the end of the year. Driving for Wayne Day in the No. 05 31-W Insulation Chevy on a two-race deal. Day ended the first practice session 30th out of 50 cars entered. By the final practice session Day was 19th out of the 48 cars left. Day easily made the show, qualifying the No. 05 31-W Insulation Chevy solidly in the top-ten with a career high ninth place starting position. However the race did not end so high for Day. After 86 laps, Day pulled the No. 05 31-W Insulation Chevy into the garage due to overheating issues and he finished 33rd, but this could have been a start and park effort.

=== Late model racing ===
Day won the 2006 Late Model Championship, and several races in the Late Model Division at Music City Motorplex in Nashville, Tennessee. In conjunction with the Music City Motorplex (Fairgrounds Speedway) and its sponsor, Dollar General started Operation Big Chance during the 2006 race season for a chance to race in the NASCAR Craftsman Truck Series race in Martinsville, Virginia, in the No. 2 Kevin Harvick Incorporated (KHI) Chevy Silverado in the 2007 season. Day was the Dollar General Operation Big Chance winner after being the track champion with the most points at the end of the year between all late model and super truck series drivers. After being announced the Operation Big Chance winner, KHI offered Day a chance to qualify at Martinsville Truck Series race in 2007, but Day declined due to prior engagements with his late model series team. The next in line for the chance was second place Willie Allen but Allen had just signed to drive the No. 13 Chevy Silverado for ThorSport for the full 2007 NASCAR Craftsman Truck Series season. MCM and Dollar General finally announced Daniel Pope the Dollar General Operation Big Chance winner and made his debut at Mansfield Motorsports Park. Day has since been a part of a Souther Superstar Series which travels around to a handful of tracks around the Southern United States. He has won four of the five championships that he has been eligible to win, and lost the 2014 Title because of a wreck he was involved in with two laps to go in a race where he would have clinched the Championship.

=== Controversy ===
In 2002, Day had a friend enter a car in a NASCAR-sanctioned late model race at Nashville Speedway USA for the sole purpose of finishing behind rival Deborah Renshaw so that he could file a protest (per NASCAR rules). Track promoter Dennis Glau had contacted NASCAR, who instructed him to disallow the protest. Her father and team owner Dan Renshaw, however, felt there was nothing to lose and allowed officials to search the engine. Unfortunately, a minor violation was found and her car was declared illegal. The protest was not only for Renshaw, but her male teammate Chevy White.

== Motorsports career results ==
=== Stock car career summary ===
Season	Series	Team	Races	Wins	Top 5	Top 10	Points	Position
1995	NASCAR Busch Series	Day Enterprise Racing	0	0	0	0	0	N/A
1996	NASCAR Craftsman Truck Series	Charles Zahn	1	0	0	0	70	120th
1996	NASCAR Busch Series	Day Enterprise Racing	0	0	0	0	0	N/A
1997	NASCAR Busch Series	Day Enterprise Racing	5	0	0	0	281	71st
1998	NASCAR Busch Series	Day Enterprise Racing	1	0	0	0	55	114th
1999	NASCAR Busch Series	Day Enterprise Racing	1	0	0	0	40	131st
2000	NASCAR Busch Series	Day Enterprise Racing	1	0	0	0	43	113th
2001	NASCAR Busch Series	Day Enterprise Racing	2	0	0	0	125	98th
2003	NASCAR Busch Series	Day Enterprise Racing	0	0	0	0	0	N/A
2009	NASCAR Nationwide Series	Day Enterprise Racing	3	0	0	0	159	110th
2024	ASA STARS National Tour	Day Enterprises	1	0	0	0	24	94th
2026	IHRA Pro Late Model Series	Day Enterprises	3	0	2	3	127	**3rd**
2026	CARS Pro Late Model Tour	N/A	0	0	0	0	0	N/A

=== NASCAR ===
(key) (Bold – Pole position awarded by qualifying time. Italics – Pole position earned by points standings or practice time. * – Most laps led.)

==== Nationwide Series ====
NASCAR Nationwide Series results
Year	Team	No.	Make	1	2	3	4	5	6	7	8	9	10	11	12	13	14	15	16	17	18	19	20	21	22	23	24	25	26	27	28	29	30	31	32	33	34	35	NNSC	Pts	Ref
1995	Day Enterprise Racing	16	Chevy	DAY	CAR	RCH	ATL	NSV	DAR	BRI; DNQ	HCY	NHA	NZH	CLT	DOV	MYB	GLN	MLW	TAL	SBO	IRP	MCH	BRI; DNQ	DAR	RCH	DOV	CLT	CAR	HOM										N/A	0	
1996	Day Enterprise Racing	16	Chevy	DAY	CAR	RCH	ATL	NSV	DAR	BRI	HCY	NZH	CLT	DOV	SBO	MYB	GLN	MLW	NHA	TAL	IRP; DNQ	MCH	BRI	DAR	RCH; DNQ	DOV	CLT; DNQ	CAR	HOM										N/A	0	
1997	Day Enterprise Racing	16	Pontiac	DAY; DNQ	CAR	RCH	ATL	LVS	DAR	HCY				TAL; 31	NHA	NZH	CLT; DNQ	DOV	SBO	GLN	MLW; 38	MYB	GTY; DNQ	IRP; DNQ	MCH; DNQ	BRI; 35	DAR	RCH	DOV	CLT; DNQ	CAL	CAR	HOM						71st	281	
1997	Day Enterprise Racing	16	Chevy								TEX; 36	BRI	NSV; 38																										71st	281	
1998	Day Enterprise Racing	16	Pontiac	DAY; DNQ	CAR	LVS	NSV; DNQ	DAR	BRI	TEX; DNQ	HCY	TAL; DNQ	NHA	NZH	CLT	DOV	RCH	PPR; 36	GLN	MLW	MYB	CAL	SBO	IRP; DNQ	MCH	BRI; DNQ	DAR	RCH	DOV	CLT	GTY	CAR; DNQ	ATL	HOM					114th	55	
1999	Day Enterprise Racing	16	Pontiac	DAY; DNQ	CAR	LVS	ATL; DNQ	DAR	TEX; DNQ	NSV; DNQ	BRI	TAL	CAL	NHA	RCH	NZH	CLT	DOV	SBO	GLN	MLW	MYB	PPR	GTY	IRP	MCH	BRI; 41	DAR	RCH	DOV	CLT	CAR	MEM	PHO	HOM				131st	40	
2000	Day Enterprise Racing	16	Pontiac	DAY	CAR	LVS	ATL	DAR	BRI; DNQ	TEX	NSV; 40	TAL	CAL	RCH	NHA	CLT	DOV	SBO	MYB	GLN	MLW	NZH	PPR	GTY	IRP	MCH	BRI	DAR	RCH	DOV	CLT	CAR	MEM	PHO	HOM				113th	43	
2001	Day Enterprise Racing	16	Chevy	DAY	CAR	LVS	ATL	DAR	BRI	TEX; 36																													98th	125	
2001	Day Enterprise Racing	16	Pontiac								NSH; 31	TAL	CAL	RCH	NHA	NZH	CLT	DOV	KEN	MLW	GLN	CHI	GTY	PPR	IRP	MCH	BRI	DAR	RCH	DOV	KAN	CLT	MEM	PHO	CAR	HOM			98th	125	
2003	Day Enterprise Racing	81	Pontiac	DAY; DNQ	CAR	LVS	DAR	BRI	TEX	TAL	NSH	CAL	RCH	GTY	NZH	CLT	DOV	NSH	KEN	MLW	DAY	CHI	NHA	PPR	IRP	MCH	BRI	DAR	RCH	DOV	KAN	CLT	MEM	ATL	PHO	CAR	HOM		N/A	0	
2009	Day Enterprise Racing	05	Chevy	DAY	CAL	LVS	BRI	TEX	NSH	PHO	TAL	RCH	DAR	CLT	DOV	NSH	KEN	MLW	NHA	DAY	CHI	GTY	IRP	IOW	GLN	MCH	BRI	CGV	ATL	RCH	DOV	KAN	CAL	CLT	MEM; 33	TEX; 38	PHO	HOM; 39	110th	159	

==== Craftsman Truck Series ====
NASCAR Craftsman Truck Series results
Year	Team	No.	Make	1	2	3	4	5	6	7	8	9	10	11	12	13	14	15	16	17	18	19	20	21	22	23	24	NCTC	Pts	Ref
1996	Charles Zahn	50	Chevy	HOM	PHO	POR	EVG	TUS	CNS	HPT	BRI	NZH	MLW	LVL	I70	IRP	FLM	GLN	NSV; 31	RCH	NHA	MAR	NWS	SON	MMR	PHO	LVS	120th	70	

=== CARS Pro Late Model Tour ===
(key)

CARS Pro Late Model Tour results
Year	Team	No.	Make	1	2	3	4	5	6	7	8	9	10	11	CPLMTC	Pts	Ref
2026	N/A	05	N/A	SNM	NSV; Wth	CRW	ACE	NWS	HCY	AND	FLC	TCM	NPS	SBO	N/A	0	

=== IHRA Pro Late Model Series ===
(key) (Bold – Pole position awarded by qualifying time. Italics – Pole position earned by points standings or practice time. * – Most laps led. ** – All laps led.)

IHRA Pro Late Model Series
Year	Team	No.	Make	1	2	3	ISCSS	Pts	Ref
2026	Day Enterprises	8	Toyota	DUB; 10	CDL; 3	AND; 4	3rd	127	

=== ASA STARS National Tour ===
(key) (Bold – Pole position awarded by qualifying time. Italics – Pole position earned by points standings or practice time. * – Most laps led. ** – All laps led.)

ASA STARS National Tour results
Year	Team	No.	Make	1	2	3	4	5	6	7	8	9	10	ASNTC	Pts	Ref
2024	Day Enterprises	8	N/A	NSM	FIF	HCY	MAD	MLW	AND	OWO	TOL	WIN	NSV; 28	94th	24	
