= Andy Kirby =

American racing driver (1961–2002)

- Born: November 30, 1961; White House, Tennessee, U.S.
- Died: July 18, 2002 (aged 40); White House, Tennessee, U.S.
- Cause of death: Motorcycle accident
- Achievements: 1994, 1996, 1997 Nashville Speedway USA Track Champion
- Awards: Fairgrounds Speedway Hall of Fame (2001)

NASCAR O'Reilly Auto Parts Series career
- 28 races run over 4 years
- Best finish: 48th (2002)
- First race: 1999 Alltel 200 (Rockingham)
- Last race: 2002 Kroger 300 (Kentucky)
Wins	Top tens	Poles
0	1	0
- Statistics up to date as of November 2, 2013.

Andy Kirby (November 30, 1961 – July 18, 2002) was an American former stock car racing driver, most notably in NASCAR. Kirby earned his reputation as a motorcycle racer in the Southeastern United States. Kirby would eventually become friends with NASCAR Busch Series driver Chad Chaffin, who in turn would assist Kirby in enhancing his career.

== Early career ==
Kirby turned heads by winning three track championships (1994, 1996, and 1997) at the highly competitive Nashville Speedway USA. He raced weekly against Chaffin (the 1993 and 1995 champion).

== Busch Series career ==
Owner Larry Lockamy offered Kirby a ride in his No. 28 Williams Travel Centers Chevy for some 1999 events. Kirby made his debut in February at Rockingham. He qualified in the 38th position, completed 157 laps, and then wrecked, finishing 31st. The next race in Las Vegas, he qualified in fifth place for his second career start. However, he wrecked and finished 42nd. He was 33rd at his home track, Nashville, 36th at Loudon and 26th at Dover Downs. His best finish came at Bristol. After starting 34th, Kirby finished in 20th. However, due to a lack of funding and performance, the Lockamy team released him.

However, Williams Travel was still intrigued by Kirby, and they got him a five-race deal in 2000 with the No. 39 Williams Chevy. He beat his Bristol finish with a 19th at Talladega. Later on, he placed 28th (at IRP), 33rd (at Bristol), 38th (at Memphis), and received one DNQ (Did not qualify).

In 2001, Andy mainly stayed at home but he had several offers during the season and got some seat time. He drove two races for Jay Robinson Racing. He once again got a career-best of 16th at Talladega and finished 33rd at Darlington. He ran three races for Moy Racing. He drove the No. 77 Ford to a 30th at Michigan International Speedway, 41st at Kansas, and 32nd at Homestead-Miami. He ran one race in the No. 52 Means Racing Ford. He finished 41st at Memphis.

Kirby ran well enough in 2001 to be asked back to those teams in 2002. He ran the first five races for Moy, finished 28th at Las Vegas as the best among those five. Jay Robinson asked him to come for four races. Kirby received his best career finish at Talladega once again. After avoiding a big wreck, Andy was able to come home in sixth position, his first and only top-ten. In the other three races, he finished 23rd, 29th, and 32nd. Kirby ran two races for Fred Bickford. He finished 39th and 41st in those races. Kirby's final start came at Kentucky Speedway, where he finished 23rd.

== Death ==
Kirby was getting ready to make a start at Pikes Peak. However, he was killed in a motorcycle accident in his hometown White House, Tennessee, on July 18, 2002. Kirby lost control of his motorcycle on a curve and crashed into a tree about 219 feet (67 m) away. Many teams ran decals on their cars honoring Kirby following his death.

== Motorsports results ==
=== NASCAR ===
(key) (Bold – Pole position awarded by qualifying time. Italics – Pole position earned by points standings or practice time. * – Most laps led.)

==== Busch Series ====
NASCAR Busch Series results
Year	Team	No.	Make	1	2	3	4	5	6	7	8	9	10	11	12	13	14	15	16	17	18	19	20	21	22	23	24	25	26	27	28	29	30	31	32	33	34	NBSC	Pts	Ref
1999	Larry Lockamy	28	Chevy	DAY	CAR; 31	LVS; 42	ATL; DNQ	DAR; DNQ	TEX; DNQ	NSV; 33	BRI; 20	TAL; DNQ	CAL; DNQ	NHA; 36	RCH; DNQ	NZH; DNQ	CLT; DNQ	DOV; 26	SBO; DNQ	GLN	MLW	MYB; DNQ	PPR	GTY	IRP	MCH	BRI	DAR	RCH	DOV	CLT	CAR	MEM	PHO	HOM			67th	414	
2000	Dan Browder	78	Chevy	DAY; Wth	CAR	LVS	ATL	DAR	BRI	TEX																												72nd	298	
2000	Brewco Motorsports	39	Chevy								NSV; DNQ	TAL; 19	CAL	RCH	NHA; DNQ	CLT	DOV	SBO	MYB; DNQ	GLN	MLW	NZH	PPR	GTY; DNQ	IRP; 28	MCH	BRI; 33	DAR; DNQ	RCH	DOV; DNQ	CLT	CAR; DNQ	MEM; 38	PHO	HOM			72nd	298	
2001	Jay Robinson Racing	49	Chevy	DAY; DNQ	CAR	LVS	ATL	DAR	BRI	TEX	NSH	TAL; 16	CAL	RCH	NHA	NZH	CLT	DOV	KEN	MLW	GLN	CHI	GTY	PPR	IRP													59th	399	
2001	PRW Racing	77	Ford																							MCH; 30	BRI				KAN; 41	CLT				HOM; 32		59th	399	
2001	Jay Robinson Racing	49	Ford																									DAR; 33	RCH									59th	399	
2001	Means Racing	52	Ford																														MEM; 41	PHO	CAR			59th	399	
2002	Moy Racing	77	Ford	DAY; 37	CAR; 38	LVS; 28	DAR; 31	BRI; 39	TEX; QL^{†}																													48th	818	
2002	Jay Robinson Racing	49	Ford							NSH; 29	TAL; 6	CAL; 32							KEN; 23	MLW	DAY	CHI	GTY	PPR	IRP	MCH	BRI	DAR	RCH	DOV	KAN	CLT	MEM	ATL	CAR	PHO	HOM	48th	818	
2002	R3B Motorsports	94	Chevy										RCH; 38	NHA	NZH	CLT	DOV; 39	NSH; 41																				48th	818	
^{†} - Qualified but replaced by Brad Teague

=== ARCA Re/Max Series ===
(key) (Bold – Pole position awarded by qualifying time. Italics – Pole position earned by points standings or practice time. * – Most laps led.)

ARCA Re/Max Series results
Year	Team	No.	Make	1	2	3	4	5	6	7	8	9	10	11	12	13	14	15	16	17	18	19	20	21	22	23	24	25	ARMC	Pts	Ref
2001	Andy Kirby	49	Ford	DAY	NSH	WIN	SLM	GTY	KEN	CLT	KAN	MCH	POC	MEM	GLN	KEN	MCH	POC	NSH	ISF	CHI	DSF	SLM	TOL	BLN	CLT	TAL; 4	ATL	188th	30	
