= Patrick Donahue =

Patrick Donahue may refer to:

- Patrick James Donahue (1849–1922), English prelate of the Roman Catholic Church
- Patrick J. Donahue II (born 1957), United States Army general

== See also ==
- Patrick Donoghue (fl. 1920s), English footballer
- Patrick Donohoe (1820–1876), Irish recipient of the Victoria Cross
