= Sandy Jones =

American journalist (born 1943

- Born: August 16, 1943 (age 83); Atlanta, Georgia, U.S.
- Education: Furman University (BD); Appalachian State University (MD)
- Occupations: Author; pregnancy expert
- Children: Marcie Jones

Sandy Jones (born August 16, 1943) is an American author and pregnancy and parenting expert. She has written, and co-authored, a dozen books since 1976, including the Great Expectations series, focusing on a baby's first years. She has been a lecturer at several events, including La Leche League conferences, an organization that educates women on breast-feeding.

Jones has a Bachelor's degree in psychology from Furman University in Greenville, South Carolina and a Master's degree in psychology from Appalachian State University in Boone, North Carolina. She is divorced, and has one daughter, Marcie Jones, who she has co-authored two books with.

== Career ==
According to her author profile, on Amazon, she has written over 200 of articles on consumer issues and parenting have been published in national publications including Family Circle, Redbook, American Baby, and Working Mother. She has served as a columnist for Parents, Parenting and Woman's World.

As a speaker, Jones has made presentations for the national conferences of La Leche League International and has made a presentation at the National Association for the Education of Young Children conference.

In addition, she has lectured to parenting groups and professionals working with parents across the nation including her unique "Empowerment for Mothers" seminar presented to hundreds of mothers in the United States and Europe.

Jones disagrees with child-care experts like Dr. Spock, who advocate for letting a baby cry so they learn not to, saying "Letting him scream is not humane, and it hurts his spirit." Linda Ziedrich, a book editor for Jones says:

"She believes that a baby's cries should be answered. She gives the reader a real feel for what a baby's needs are, . . . for helping babies instead of neglecting them. She really does have empathy."

Reviewer, Michelle Ondeck, RN, IBCLC, LCC, FACCE, recommended Jones' Great Expectations series, saying it was well researched; noting that Sandy and her daughter, Marcie, "compiled an extensive resource of over 1,000 topics for pregnancy and childbirth. Her assessment was included in The Journal of Perinatal Education, "Helpful Resources for Childbirth Educators and Parents."

== Bibliography ==
- Good Things for Babies, Houghton Mifflin, 1976. ISBN 0-3952-1501-3
- Learning for Little Kids, Mariner Books, 1979. ISBN 0-3952-7210-6
- To Love a Baby, Houghton Mifflin, 1981. ISBN 0-3953-1296-5
- Guide to Baby Products, Co-authored with Werner Freitag, Consumer Reports Books, 1991. ISBN 0-8904-3360-7
- Crying Baby, Sleepless Nights, Houghton Mifflin Harcourt, 1992. ISBN 1-5583-2045-8
- Great Expectations: Your All-in-one Resource for Pregnancy & Childbirth. Co-authored with her daughter, Marcie Jones, Banes & Noble Books, 2004. ISBN 0-7607-4132-8
- Great Expectations: Pregnancy Journal & Planner, Co-authored with her daughter, Marcie Jones, Sterling Publishing Company, 2005. ISBN 1-4027-2824-7
- Comforting Your Crying Baby: Why Your Baby is Crying and What You Can Do about it. Innova Publishing, 2005. ISBN 0-9749-3731-2
- Great Expectations: Baby's First Year. Sterling Publishing Company, 2007. ISBN 1-4027-3646-0
- Great Expectations: Best Baby Gear.Co-authored with her daughter, Marcie Jones, Sterling Publishing Company, 2008. ISBN 1-4027-3335-6
- Great Expectations: Baby Sleep Guide. Sterling Publishing Company, 2010. ISBN 1-4027-7640-3
- Great Expectations: The Toddler Years: The essential guide to your 1-to-3-year-old. Sterling Publishing Company, 2011. ISBN 1-4027-5816-2
