= NASCAR Busch Series at Nashville Speedway USA =

NASCAR Busch Series at Nashville Fairgrounds

NASCAR Busch Series
- Venue: Nashville Speedway USA
- First race: 1984
- Last race: 2000
- Distance: 190.72 miles (306.93 km)
- Laps: 320
- Previous names: Nashville 200 (1984); CarQuest 200 (1988); Granger Select 200 (1989); Opryland USA 320 (1995); BellSouth / Opryland USA 320 (1996); BellSouth Mobility / Opryland 320 (1997-1998); BellSouth Mobility 320 (1999-2000)

Stock car races in the now-NASCAR Xfinity Series were held at Nashville Fairgrounds Speedway, in Nashville, Tennessee, in 1984, 1988–1989, and between 1995 and 2000.

Debuting as a 200-lap race of 119.2 miles (191.8 km), it was originally held only during the 1984 season. The event returned the schedule in 1988, and again in 1989, after which it was removed a second time. The race returned to the Busch circuit yet again in 1995, this time the race distance being extended from 200 to 320 laps, now covering 190.7 miles (306.9 km) in distance. The race remained on the Busch Series schedule for the next six seasons, but was removed a third and final time following the 2000 season.

Two other short tracks, Myrtle Beach Speedway and South Boston Speedway, were also removed from the Busch Series schedule after the 2000 season. This extra room created on the schedule was used to help add new races at Chicagoland Speedway, Kansas Speedway, Nashville Superspeedway, and Kentucky Speedway starting in 2001.

== Past winners ==
Year	Date	Driver	Team	Manufacturer	Race Distance		Race Time	Average Speed (mph)	Report	Ref
Year	Date	Driver	Team	Manufacturer	Laps	Miles (km)	Race Time	Average Speed (mph)	Report	Ref
1984	April 28	Jack Ingram	Jack Ingram Racing	Pontiac	200	119.2 (191.833)	1:19:39	89.793	Report	
1988	May 21	Darrell Waltrip	DarWal, Inc.	Chevrolet	200	119.2 (191.833)	1:16:13	93.838	Report	
1989	May 20	Rick Mast	A.G. Dillard Motorsports	Buick	200	119.2 (191.833)	1:21:36	87.290	Report	
1995	March 19	David Green	Labonte Motorsports	Chevrolet	320	190.72 (306.934)	2:26:18	78.217	Report	
1996	March 17	Bobby Labonte	Labonte Motorsports	Chevrolet	320	190.72 (306.934)	2:57:27	64.487	Report	
1997	April 19	Steve Park	Dale Earnhardt, Inc.	Chevrolet	320	190.72 (306.934)	2:57:16	64.554	Report	
1998	March 15	Mike McLaughlin	Team 34	Chevrolet	320	190.72 (306.934)	2:17:55	82.972	Report	
1999	April 3	Jeff Green	Progressive Motorsports	Chevrolet	320	190.72 (306.934)	2:16:52	83.608	Report	
2000	April 8	Randy LaJoie	Phoenix Racing	Chevrolet	320	190.72 (306.934)	2:28:35	77.015	Report	
