= 1996 Dura Lube 500 =

30th race of the 1996 NASCAR Winston Cup Series

Race details
- Race 30 of 31 in the 1996 NASCAR Winston Cup Series
- The 1996 Dura Lube 500 program cover.
- Date: October 27, 1996
- Official name: 9th Annual Dura Lube 500
- Location: Avondale, Arizona, Phoenix International Raceway
- Course: Permanent racing facility
- Course length: 1 miles (1.6 km)
- Distance: 312 laps, 312 mi (502.115 km)
- Average speed: 109.709 miles per hour (176.560 km/h)

Pole position
Driver	Bobby Labonte	Joe Gibbs Racing
- Time: 27.465

Most laps led
Driver	Mark Martin	Roush Racing
- Laps: 83

Winner
No. 43	Bobby Hamilton	Petty Enterprises

Television in the United States
- Network: TNN
- Announcers: Eli Gold, Buddy Baker, Dick Berggren

Radio in the United States
- Radio: Motor Racing Network

The 1996 Dura Lube 500 was the 30th and penultimate stock car race of the 1996 NASCAR Winston Cup Series, the 14th and penultimate race of the 1996 NASCAR Winston West Series, and the ninth iteration of the event. The race was held on Sunday, October 27, 1996, in Avondale, Arizona at Phoenix International Raceway, a 1-mile (1.6 km) permanent low-banked tri-oval race track. The race took the scheduled 312 laps to complete. In the late stages of the race, Petty Enterprises driver Bobby Hamilton would manage to make a late race pass and dominate to take his first career NASCAR Winston Cup Series victory and his only victory of the season.

Heading into the final race of the season, the 1996 NAPA 500 at Atlanta Motor Speedway, points leader Terry Labonte would come into the race with a 47 point lead over teammate Jeff Gordon. To clinch the championship, Labonte would need to finish eighth or better.

== Background ==
The layout of Phoenix International Raceway, the venue where the race was held.

Phoenix International Raceway is a one-mile, low-banked tri-oval race track located in Avondale, Arizona. It is named after the nearby metropolitan area of Phoenix. The motorsport track opened in 1964. The raceway is currently owned and operated by International Speedway Corporation.

The raceway was originally constructed with a 2.5 mi (4.0 km) road course that ran both inside and outside of the main tri-oval. In 1991 the track was reconfigured with the current 1.51 mi (2.43 km) interior layout. PIR has an estimated grandstand seating capacity of around 67,000. Lights were installed around the track in 2004 following the addition of a second annual NASCAR race weekend.

=== Entry list ===
- (R) denotes rookie driver.

#	Driver	Team	Make
00	Scott Gaylord	Oliver Racing	Chevrolet
1	Rick Mast	Precision Products Racing	Pontiac
01	Jeff Krogh	Excel Motorsports	Chevrolet
2	Rusty Wallace	Penske Racing South	Ford
02	Bill McAnally	Bill McAnally Racing	Chevrolet
3	Dale Earnhardt	Richard Childress Racing	Chevrolet
03	Joe Bean	Bean Racing	Ford
4	Sterling Marlin	Morgan–McClure Motorsports	Chevrolet
5	Terry Labonte	Hendrick Motorsports	Chevrolet
6	Mark Martin	Roush Racing	Ford
7	Geoff Bodine	Geoff Bodine Racing	Ford
07	Lance Hooper	Golden West Motorsports	Pontiac
8	Hut Stricklin	Stavola Brothers Racing	Ford
9	Lake Speed	Melling Racing	Ford
10	Ricky Rudd	Rudd Performance Motorsports	Ford
11	Brett Bodine	Brett Bodine Racing	Ford
12	Derrike Cope	Bobby Allison Motorsports	Ford
15	Wally Dallenbach Jr.	Bud Moore Engineering	Ford
16	Ted Musgrave	Roush Racing	Ford
17	Darrell Waltrip	Darrell Waltrip Motorsports	Chevrolet
18	Bobby Labonte	Joe Gibbs Racing	Chevrolet
19	Dick Trickle	TriStar Motorsports	Ford
20	Mark Krogh	Excel Motorsports	Chevrolet
21	Michael Waltrip	Wood Brothers Racing	Ford
22	Ward Burton	Bill Davis Racing	Pontiac
23	Jimmy Spencer	Haas-Carter Motorsports	Ford
24	Jeff Gordon	Hendrick Motorsports	Chevrolet
25	Ken Schrader	Hendrick Motorsports	Chevrolet
28	Ernie Irvan	Robert Yates Racing	Ford
29	Robert Pressley	Diamond Ridge Motorsports	Chevrolet
30	Johnny Benson Jr. (R)	Bahari Racing	Pontiac
33	Todd Bodine	Andy Petree Racing	Chevrolet
35	Larry Gunselman	Race Stuff Motorsports	Ford
37	Jeremy Mayfield	Kranefuss-Haas Racing	Ford
38	Rich Woodland Jr.	Bill Stroppe Motorsports	Chevrolet
40	Robby Gordon	Team SABCO	Chevrolet
41	Ricky Craven	Larry Hedrick Motorsports	Chevrolet
42	Kyle Petty	Team SABCO	Pontiac
43	Bobby Hamilton	Petty Enterprises	Pontiac
52	Jack Sprague	Ken Schrader Racing	Pontiac
71	Dave Marcis	Marcis Auto Racing	Chevrolet
75	Morgan Shepherd	Butch Mock Motorsports	Ford
77	Bobby Hillin Jr.	Jasper Motorsports	Ford
81	Kenny Wallace	FILMAR Racing	Ford
87	Joe Nemechek	NEMCO Motorsports	Chevrolet
88	Dale Jarrett	Robert Yates Racing	Ford
90	Dick Trickle	Donlavey Racing	Ford
94	Bill Elliott	Bill Elliott Racing	Ford
98	Jeremy Mayfield	Cale Yarborough Motorsports	Ford
99	Jeff Burton	Roush Racing	Ford

== Qualifying ==
Qualifying was originally scheduled to be split into two rounds. The first round was scheduled to be held on Friday, October 25, at 4:30 PM EST. However, only six drivers were able to set a lap before qualifying was rained out and postponed until Saturday, October 26, at 2:00 PM EST. Qualifying was eventually combined into only one round. Each driver would have one lap to set a time. For this specific race, positions 26-38 would be decided on time, and depending on who needed it, a select amount of positions were given to cars who had not otherwise qualified but were high enough in owner's points.

Bobby Labonte, driving for Joe Gibbs Racing, setting a time of 27.465 and an average speed of 131.076 miles per hour (210.946 km/h).

Six drivers would fail to qualify: Mark Krogh, Scott Gaylord, Larry Gunselman, Rich Woodland Jr., Joe Bean, and Bill McAnally.

=== Full qualifying results ===
Pos.	#	Driver	Team	Make	Time	Speed
1	18	Bobby Labonte	Joe Gibbs Racing	Chevrolet	27.465	131.076
2	31	Mike Skinner	Richard Childress Racing	Chevrolet	27.545	130.695
3	10	Ricky Rudd	Rudd Performance Motorsports	Ford	27.587	130.496
4	25	Ken Schrader	Hendrick Motorsports	Chevrolet	27.617	130.354
5	88	Dale Jarrett	Robert Yates Racing	Ford	27.669	130.110
6	6	Mark Martin	Roush Racing	Ford	27.680	130.058
7	81	Kenny Wallace	FILMAR Racing	Ford	27.693	129.997
8	1	Rick Mast	Precision Products Racing	Pontiac	27.694	129.992
9	2	Rusty Wallace	Penske Racing South	Ford	27.701	129.959
10	37	Jeremy Mayfield	Kranefuss-Haas Racing	Ford	27.734	129.805
11	94	Bill Elliott	Bill Elliott Racing	Ford	27.746	129.748
12	28	Ernie Irvan	Robert Yates Racing	Ford	27.749	129.734
13	33	Todd Bodine	Andy Petree Racing	Chevrolet	27.762	129.674
14	98	John Andretti	Cale Yarborough Motorsports	Ford	27.763	129.669
15	4	Sterling Marlin	Morgan–McClure Motorsports	Chevrolet	27.781	129.585
16	87	Joe Nemechek	NEMCO Motorsports	Chevrolet	27.792	129.534
17	43	Bobby Hamilton	Petty Enterprises	Pontiac	27.794	129.524
18	17	Darrell Waltrip	Darrell Waltrip Motorsports	Chevrolet	27.810	129.450
19	24	Jeff Gordon	Hendrick Motorsports	Chevrolet	27.815	129.427
20	15	Wally Dallenbach Jr.	Bud Moore Engineering	Ford	27.817	129.417
21	99	Jeff Burton	Roush Racing	Ford	27.826	129.375
22	42	Kyle Petty	Team SABCO	Pontiac	27.856	129.236
23	30	Johnny Benson Jr. (R)	Bahari Racing	Pontiac	27.870	129.171
24	3	Dale Earnhardt	Richard Childress Racing	Chevrolet	27.884	129.106
25	16	Ted Musgrave	Roush Racing	Ford	27.896	129.051
26	75	Morgan Shepherd	Butch Mock Motorsports	Ford	27.900	129.032
27	12	Derrike Cope	Bobby Allison Motorsports	Ford	27.902	129.023
28	7	Geoff Bodine	Geoff Bodine Racing	Ford	27.911	128.981
29	90	Dick Trickle	Donlavey Racing	Ford	27.922	128.931
30	5	Terry Labonte	Hendrick Motorsports	Chevrolet	27.954	128.783
31	21	Michael Waltrip	Wood Brothers Racing	Ford	27.954	128.783
32	40	Robby Gordon	Team SABCO	Chevrolet	27.954	128.783
33	9	Lake Speed	Melling Racing	Ford	27.960	128.755
34	52	Jack Sprague	Ken Schrader Racing	Pontiac	27.981	128.659
35	11	Brett Bodine	Brett Bodine Racing	Ford	27.991	128.613
36	29	Robert Pressley	Diamond Ridge Motorsports	Chevrolet	28.017	128.493
37	23	Jimmy Spencer	Travis Carter Enterprises	Ford	28.038	128.397
38	71	Dave Marcis	Marcis Auto Racing	Chevrolet	28.063	128.283
Winston Cup provisionals
39	41	Ricky Craven	Larry Hedrick Motorsports	Chevrolet	-*	-*
40	8	Hut Stricklin	Stavola Brothers Racing	Ford	-*	-*
41	22	Ward Burton	Bill Davis Racing	Pontiac	-*	-*
42	77	Bobby Hillin Jr.	Jasper Motorsports	Ford	-*	-*
Winston West provisionals
43	07	Lance Hooper	Golden West Motorsports	Pontiac	-*	-*
44	01	Jeff Krogh	Excel Motorsports	Chevrolet	-*	-*
Failed to qualify
45	20	Mark Krogh	Excel Motorsports	Chevrolet	-*	-*
46	00	Scott Gaylord	Oliver Racing	Chevrolet	-*	-*
47	35	Larry Gunselman	Race Stuff Motorsports	Ford	-*	-*
48	38	Rich Woodland Jr.	Bill Stroppe Motorsports	Ford	-*	-*
49	03	Joe Bean	Bean Racing	Chevrolet	-*	-*
50	02	Bill McAnally	Bill McAnally Racing	Chevrolet	-*	-*
Official starting lineup

== Race results ==
Fin	St	#	Driver	Team	Make	Laps	Led	Status	Pts	Winnings
1	17	43	Bobby Hamilton	Petty Enterprises	Pontiac	312	40	running	180	$95,550
2	6	6	Mark Martin	Roush Racing	Ford	312	83	running	180	$59,795
3	30	5	Terry Labonte	Hendrick Motorsports	Chevrolet	312	61	running	170	$61,590
4	25	16	Ted Musgrave	Roush Racing	Ford	312	2	running	165	$35,153
5	19	24	Jeff Gordon	Hendrick Motorsports	Chevrolet	312	0	running	155	$45,065
6	28	7	Geoff Bodine	Geoff Bodine Racing	Ford	312	31	running	155	$30,555
7	12	28	Ernie Irvan	Robert Yates Racing	Ford	312	0	running	146	$31,555
8	5	88	Dale Jarrett	Robert Yates Racing	Ford	312	29	running	147	$22,055
9	1	18	Bobby Labonte	Joe Gibbs Racing	Chevrolet	312	54	running	143	$34,555
10	18	17	Darrell Waltrip	Darrell Waltrip Motorsports	Chevrolet	312	0	running	134	$27,155
11	13	33	Todd Bodine	Andy Petree Racing	Chevrolet	312	0	running	130	$23,955
12	24	3	Dale Earnhardt	Richard Childress Racing	Chevrolet	312	0	running	127	$29,055
13	2	31	Mike Skinner	Richard Childress Racing	Chevrolet	311	0	running	124	$12,255
14	3	10	Ricky Rudd	Rudd Performance Motorsports	Ford	311	0	running	121	$26,855
15	20	15	Wally Dallenbach Jr.	Bud Moore Engineering	Ford	311	0	running	118	$22,355
16	31	21	Michael Waltrip	Wood Brothers Racing	Ford	311	0	running	115	$22,055
17	26	75	Morgan Shepherd	Butch Mock Motorsports	Ford	311	0	running	112	$14,855
18	37	23	Jimmy Spencer	Travis Carter Enterprises	Ford	311	10	running	114	$22,330
19	14	98	John Andretti	Cale Yarborough Motorsports	Ford	310	0	running	106	$14,330
20	29	90	Dick Trickle	Donlavey Racing	Ford	310	0	running	103	$15,745
21	11	94	Bill Elliott	Bill Elliott Racing	Ford	310	0	running	100	$20,820
22	41	22	Ward Burton	Bill Davis Racing	Pontiac	310	0	running	97	$25,195
23	34	52	Jack Sprague	Ken Schrader Racing	Pontiac	310	2	running	99	$10,170
24	38	71	Dave Marcis	Marcis Auto Racing	Chevrolet	309	0	running	91	$13,620
25	16	87	Joe Nemechek	NEMCO Motorsports	Chevrolet	309	0	running	88	$20,695
26	35	11	Brett Bodine	Brett Bodine Racing	Ford	309	0	running	85	$20,370
27	15	4	Sterling Marlin	Morgan–McClure Motorsports	Chevrolet	308	0	running	82	$26,465
28	33	9	Lake Speed	Melling Racing	Ford	308	0	running	79	$20,220
29	22	42	Kyle Petty	Team SABCO	Pontiac	307	0	oil leak	76	$20,095
30	40	8	Hut Stricklin	Stavola Brothers Racing	Ford	307	0	running	73	$12,970
31	21	99	Jeff Burton	Roush Racing	Ford	304	0	running	70	$12,945
32	23	30	Johnny Benson Jr. (R)	Bahari Racing	Pontiac	304	0	running	67	$19,170
33	43	07	Lance Hooper	Golden West Motorsports	Pontiac	302	0	running	64	$9,645
34	39	41	Ricky Craven	Larry Hedrick Motorsports	Chevrolet	296	0	running	61	$16,620
35	4	25	Ken Schrader	Hendrick Motorsports	Chevrolet	288	0	rear end	58	$16,790
36	36	29	Robert Pressley	Diamond Ridge Motorsports	Chevrolet	257	0	engine	55	$16,565
37	7	81	Kenny Wallace	FILMAR Racing	Ford	254	0	engine	52	$9,525
38	8	1	Rick Mast	Precision Products Racing	Pontiac	198	0	engine	49	$18,465
39	42	77	Bobby Hillin Jr.	Jasper Motorsports	Ford	153	0	accident	46	$9,465
40	9	2	Rusty Wallace	Penske Racing South	Ford	151	0	engine	43	$24,465
41	44	01	Jeff Krogh	Excel Motorsports	Chevrolet	151	0	accident	40	$9,465
42	32	40	Robby Gordon	Team SABCO	Chevrolet	134	0	accident	37	$9,465
43	27	12	Derrike Cope	Bobby Allison Motorsports	Ford	114	0	accident	34	$17,465
44	10	37	Jeremy Mayfield	Kranefuss-Haas Racing	Ford	10	0	engine	31	$17,065
Official race results

Previous race: 1996 AC Delco 400	NASCAR Winston Cup Series; 1996 season	Next race: 1996 NAPA 500
