= 1991 Miller Genuine Draft 400 (Richmond) =

22nd race of the 1991 NASCAR Winston Cup Series

Race details
- Race 22 of 29 in the 1991 NASCAR Winston Cup Series
- The 1991 Miller Genuine Draft 400 program cover, featuring Rusty Wallace. Artwork by NASCAR artist Sam Bass.
- Date: September 7, 1991
- Official name: 34th Annual Miller Genuine Draft 400
- Location: Richmond, Virginia, Richmond International Raceway
- Course: Permanent racing facility
- Course length: 0.75 miles (1.21 km)
- Distance: 400 laps, 300 mi (482.803 km)
- Scheduled distance: 400 laps, 300 mi (482.803 km)
- Average speed: 101.361 miles per hour (163.125 km/h)
- Attendance: 65,000

Pole position
Driver	Rusty Wallace	Penske Racing South
- Time: 22.390

Most laps led
Driver	Davey Allison	Robert Yates Racing
- Laps: 150

Winner
No. 33	Harry Gant	Leo Jackson Motorsports

Television in the United States
- Network: TBS
- Announcers: Ken Squier, Neil Bonnett, Ken Stabler

Radio in the United States
- Radio: Motor Racing Network

The 1991 Miller Genuine Draft 400 was the 22nd stock car race of the 1991 NASCAR Winston Cup Series season and the 34th iteration of the event. The race was held on Saturday, September 7, 1991, before an audience of 69,000 in Richmond, Virginia, at Richmond International Raceway, a 0.75 miles (1.21 km) D-shaped oval. The race took the scheduled 400 laps to complete. In the final laps of the race, Leo Jackson Motorsports driver Harry Gant would manage to make a late-race charge for the lead, passing for the lead with 19 to go in the race to take his 14th career NASCAR Winston Cup Series victory, his third victory of the season, and his second straight victory. To fill out the top three, Robert Yates Racing driver Davey Allison and Penske Racing South driver Rusty Wallace would finish second and third, respectively.

== Background ==
The layout of Richmond International Raceway, the venue where the race was at.

Richmond International Raceway (RIR) is a 3/4-mile (1.2 km), D-shaped, asphalt race track located just outside Richmond, Virginia in Henrico County. It hosts the Monster Energy NASCAR Cup Series and Xfinity Series. Known as "America's premier short track", it formerly hosted a NASCAR Camping World Truck Series race, an IndyCar Series race, and two USAC sprint car races.

=== Entry list ===
- (R) denotes rookie driver.

#	Driver	Team	Make
1	Rick Mast	Precision Products Racing	Oldsmobile
2	Rusty Wallace	Penske Racing South	Pontiac
3	Dale Earnhardt	Richard Childress Racing	Chevrolet
4	Ernie Irvan	Morgan–McClure Motorsports	Chevrolet
5	Ricky Rudd	Hendrick Motorsports	Chevrolet
6	Mark Martin	Roush Racing	Ford
7	Alan Kulwicki	AK Racing	Ford
8	Rick Wilson	Stavola Brothers Racing	Buick
9	Bill Elliott	Melling Racing	Ford
10	Derrike Cope	Whitcomb Racing	Chevrolet
11	Geoff Bodine	Junior Johnson & Associates	Ford
12	Hut Stricklin	Bobby Allison Motorsports	Buick
15	Morgan Shepherd	Bud Moore Engineering	Ford
17	Darrell Waltrip	Darrell Waltrip Motorsports	Chevrolet
19	Chad Little	Little Racing	Ford
21	Dale Jarrett	Wood Brothers Racing	Ford
22	Sterling Marlin	Junior Johnson & Associates	Ford
24	Kenny Wallace	Team III Racing	Pontiac
25	Ken Schrader	Hendrick Motorsports	Chevrolet
26	Brett Bodine	King Racing	Buick
28	Davey Allison	Robert Yates Racing	Ford
30	Michael Waltrip	Bahari Racing	Pontiac
33	Harry Gant	Leo Jackson Motorsports	Oldsmobile
41	Larry Pearson	Larry Hedrick Motorsports	Chevrolet
42	Kyle Petty	SABCO Racing	Pontiac
43	Richard Petty	Petty Enterprises	Pontiac
47	Greg Sacks	Close Racing	Oldsmobile
52	Jimmy Means	Jimmy Means Racing	Pontiac
55	Ted Musgrave (R)	U.S. Racing	Pontiac
66	Lake Speed	Cale Yarborough Motorsports	Pontiac
68	Bobby Hamilton (R)	TriStar Motorsports	Oldsmobile
71	Dave Marcis	Marcis Auto Racing	Chevrolet
73	Dale Fischlein	Barkdoll Racing	Oldsmobile
75	Joe Ruttman	RahMoc Enterprises	Oldsmobile
90	Wally Dallenbach Jr. (R)	Donlavey Racing	Ford
94	Terry Labonte	Hagan Racing	Oldsmobile
98	Jimmy Spencer	Travis Carter Enterprises	Chevrolet

== Qualifying ==
Qualifying was split into two rounds. The first round was held on Friday, September 11, at 5:30 PM EST. Each driver would have one lap to set a time. During the first round, the top 20 drivers in the round would be guaranteed a starting spot in the race. If a driver was not able to guarantee a spot in the first round, they had the option to scrub their time from the first round and try and run a faster lap time in a second round qualifying run, held on Saturday, September 12, at 3:00 PM EST. As with the first round, each driver would have one lap to set a time. For this specific race, positions 21-34 would be decided on time, and depending on who needed it, a select amount of positions were given to cars who had not otherwise qualified on time but were high enough in owner's points; up to two were given. If needed, a past champion who did not qualify on either time or provisionals could use a champion's provisional, adding one more spot to the field.

Rusty Wallace, driving for Penske Racing South, would win the pole, setting a time of 22.390 and an average speed of 120.590 miles per hour (194.071 km/h) in the first round.

Dale Fischlein was the only driver to fail to qualify.

=== Full qualifying results ===
Pos.	#	Driver	Team	Make	Time	Speed
1	2	Rusty Wallace	Penske Racing South	Pontiac	22.390	120.590
2	7	Alan Kulwicki	AK Racing	Ford	22.434	120.353
3	28	Davey Allison	Robert Yates Racing	Ford	22.451	120.262
4	6	Mark Martin	Roush Racing	Ford	22.453	120.251
5	68	Bobby Hamilton (R)	TriStar Motorsports	Oldsmobile	22.501	119.995
6	4	Ernie Irvan	Morgan–McClure Motorsports	Chevrolet	22.512	119.936
7	5	Ricky Rudd	Hendrick Motorsports	Chevrolet	22.561	119.676
8	42	Kyle Petty	SABCO Racing	Pontiac	22.567	119.644
9	17	Darrell Waltrip	Darrell Waltrip Motorsports	Chevrolet	22.587	119.538
10	25	Ken Schrader	Hendrick Motorsports	Chevrolet	22.669	119.105
11	12	Hut Stricklin	Bobby Allison Motorsports	Buick	22.717	118.854
12	1	Rick Mast	Precision Products Racing	Oldsmobile	22.755	118.655
13	33	Harry Gant	Leo Jackson Motorsports	Oldsmobile	22.759	118.634
14	9	Bill Elliott	Melling Racing	Ford	22.779	118.530
15	22	Sterling Marlin	Junior Johnson & Associates	Ford	22.825	118.291
16	3	Dale Earnhardt	Richard Childress Racing	Chevrolet	22.827	118.281
17	98	Jimmy Spencer	Travis Carter Enterprises	Chevrolet	22.844	118.193
18	11	Geoff Bodine	Junior Johnson & Associates	Ford	22.862	118.100
19	43	Richard Petty	Petty Enterprises	Pontiac	22.874	118.038
20	94	Terry Labonte	Hagan Racing	Oldsmobile	22.880	118.007
Failed to lock in Round 1
21	26	Brett Bodine	King Racing	Buick	22.881	118.002
22	10	Derrike Cope	Whitcomb Racing	Chevrolet	22.907	117.868
23	47	Greg Sacks	Close Racing	Oldsmobile	22.921	117.796
24	41	Larry Pearson	Larry Hedrick Motorsports	Chevrolet	22.940	117.698
25	21	Dale Jarrett	Wood Brothers Racing	Ford	22.964	117.575
26	90	Wally Dallenbach Jr. (R)	Donlavey Racing	Ford	22.972	117.534
27	8	Rick Wilson	Stavola Brothers Racing	Buick	22.980	117.493
28	66	Lake Speed	Cale Yarborough Motorsports	Pontiac	23.004	117.371
29	24	Kenny Wallace	Team III Racing	Pontiac	23.005	117.366
30	19	Chad Little	Little Racing	Ford	23.016	117.310
31	30	Michael Waltrip	Bahari Racing	Pontiac	23.027	117.254
32	15	Morgan Shepherd	Bud Moore Engineering	Ford	23.038	117.198
33	71	Dave Marcis	Marcis Auto Racing	Chevrolet	23.040	117.188
34	75	Joe Ruttman	RahMoc Enterprises	Oldsmobile	23.118	116.792
Provisionals
35	55	Ted Musgrave (R)	U.S. Racing	Pontiac	23.411	115.330
36	52	Jimmy Means	Jimmy Means Racing	Pontiac	23.916	112.895
Failed to qualify
37	73	Dale Fischlein	Barkdoll Racing	Oldsmobile	-*	-*
Official first round qualifying results
Official starting lineup

== Race results ==
Fin	St	#	Driver	Team	Make	Laps	Led	Status	Pts	Winnings
1	13	33	Harry Gant	Leo Jackson Motorsports	Oldsmobile	400	27	running	180	$63,650
2	3	28	Davey Allison	Robert Yates Racing	Ford	400	150	running	180	$39,425
3	1	2	Rusty Wallace	Penske Racing South	Pontiac	400	124	running	170	$21,700
4	6	4	Ernie Irvan	Morgan–McClure Motorsports	Chevrolet	400	80	running	165	$20,800
5	7	5	Ricky Rudd	Hendrick Motorsports	Chevrolet	400	1	running	160	$18,125
6	2	7	Alan Kulwicki	AK Racing	Ford	400	10	running	155	$13,550
7	9	17	Darrell Waltrip	Darrell Waltrip Motorsports	Chevrolet	400	0	running	146	$9,750
8	10	25	Ken Schrader	Hendrick Motorsports	Chevrolet	400	2	running	147	$8,750
9	14	9	Bill Elliott	Melling Racing	Ford	400	0	running	138	$11,950
10	15	22	Sterling Marlin	Junior Johnson & Associates	Ford	399	0	running	134	$9,700
11	16	3	Dale Earnhardt	Richard Childress Racing	Chevrolet	398	5	running	135	$13,750
12	5	68	Bobby Hamilton (R)	TriStar Motorsports	Oldsmobile	398	0	running	127	$6,400
13	27	8	Rick Wilson	Stavola Brothers Racing	Buick	397	0	running	124	$7,000
14	18	11	Geoff Bodine	Junior Johnson & Associates	Ford	397	0	running	121	$11,500
15	17	98	Jimmy Spencer	Travis Carter Enterprises	Chevrolet	397	0	running	118	$7,350
16	22	10	Derrike Cope	Whitcomb Racing	Chevrolet	397	0	running	115	$10,925
17	28	66	Lake Speed	Cale Yarborough Motorsports	Pontiac	397	0	running	112	$6,425
18	21	26	Brett Bodine	King Racing	Buick	396	0	running	109	$5,175
19	20	94	Terry Labonte	Hagan Racing	Oldsmobile	396	0	running	106	$6,000
20	25	21	Dale Jarrett	Wood Brothers Racing	Ford	396	0	running	103	$6,925
21	11	12	Hut Stricklin	Bobby Allison Motorsports	Buick	396	0	running	100	$5,800
22	35	55	Ted Musgrave (R)	U.S. Racing	Pontiac	395	0	running	97	$4,475
23	32	15	Morgan Shepherd	Bud Moore Engineering	Ford	394	0	running	94	$9,175
24	19	43	Richard Petty	Petty Enterprises	Pontiac	393	1	running	96	$5,550
25	26	90	Wally Dallenbach Jr. (R)	Donlavey Racing	Ford	391	0	running	88	$3,500
26	8	42	Kyle Petty	SABCO Racing	Pontiac	388	0	running	85	$9,075
27	12	1	Rick Mast	Precision Products Racing	Oldsmobile	377	0	running	82	$5,480
28	34	75	Joe Ruttman	RahMoc Enterprises	Oldsmobile	374	0	running	79	$5,325
29	33	71	Dave Marcis	Marcis Auto Racing	Chevrolet	370	0	running	76	$4,800
30	31	30	Michael Waltrip	Bahari Racing	Pontiac	361	0	engine	73	$4,750
31	29	24	Kenny Wallace	Team III Racing	Pontiac	348	0	rear end	70	$3,200
32	23	47	Greg Sacks	Close Racing	Oldsmobile	256	0	overheating	67	$3,175
33	4	6	Mark Martin	Roush Racing	Ford	253	0	running	64	$11,870
34	30	19	Chad Little	Little Racing	Ford	55	0	crash	61	$3,150
35	36	52	Jimmy Means	Jimmy Means Racing	Pontiac	36	0	engine	58	$3,150
36	24	41	Larry Pearson	Larry Hedrick Motorsports	Chevrolet	9	0	crash	55	$3,150
Official race results

== Standings after the race ==
Drivers' Championship standings

	Pos	Driver	Points
	1	Dale Earnhardt	3,277
	2	Ricky Rudd	3,213 (-64)
	3	Ernie Irvan	3,144 (-133)
	4	Davey Allison	3,120 (–157)
1	5	Ken Schrader	2,973 (–304)
1	6	Mark Martin	2,965 (–312)
	7	Sterling Marlin	2,869 (–408)
	8	Darrell Waltrip	2,865 (–412)
	9	Harry Gant	2,836 (–441)
	10	Rusty Wallace	2,760 (–517)
Official driver's standings

- Note: Only the first 10 positions are included for the driver standings.

Previous race: 1991 Heinz Southern 500	NASCAR Winston Cup Series; 1991 season	Next race: 1991 Peak Antifreeze 500
