= 1998 NASCAR Busch Series =

American motorsport season

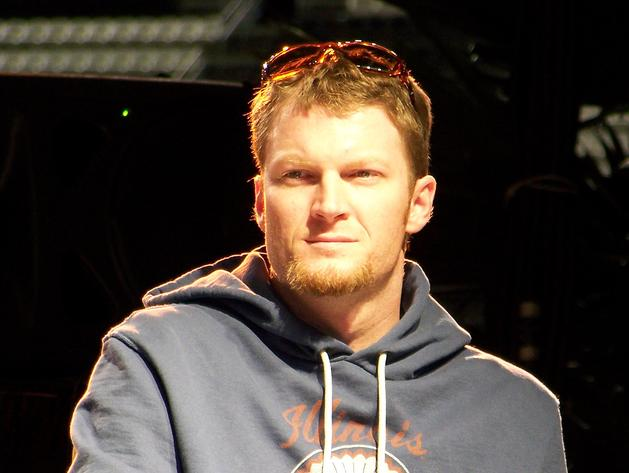
Dale Earnhardt Jr., the 1998 Busch Series champion

The 1998 NASCAR Busch Series began on Saturday, February 14 and ended on Sunday, November 15. Dale Earnhardt Jr. of Dale Earnhardt, Inc. was crowned champion at season's end.

== Teams and drivers ==
List of full-time teams at the start of 1998.

Team	Car(s)	No.	Driver(s)	Listed owner(s)	Crew chief
Akins-Sutton Motorsports	Ford Taurus	38	Elton Sawyer	Bob Sutton	Eddie Pardue
BACE Motorsports	Chevrolet Monte Carlo	33	Tim Fedewa	Barbara Baumgardner	Bryan Smith
BACE Motorsports	Chevrolet Monte Carlo	74	Randy LaJoie	Bill Baumgardner	Billy Manciewicz
Bobby Hillin Racing	Chevrolet Monte Carlo	8	Bobby Hillin Jr.	Robert Hayes	Nick Short
Brewco Motorsports	Chevrolet Monte Carlo	37	Mark Green	Clarence Brewer	Kenneth Campbell
Buckshot Racing	Pontiac Grand Prix	00	Buckshot Jones	Billy Jones	Ricky Pearson
CAA Performance Group	Pontiac Grand Prix	96	Mike Stefanik	Mike Curb	John Birosh
DAJ Racing	Ford Thunderbird	32	Jason Jarrett (R)	Horace Isenhower	Rick Bowman
Dale Earnhardt, Inc.	Chevrolet Monte Carlo	3	Dale Earnhardt Jr.	Dale Earnhardt	Tony Eury Sr.
Diamond Ridge Motorsports	Chevrolet Monte Carlo	29	Hermie Sadler	Gary Bechtel	Bob Gulbranson
Diamond Ridge Motorsports	Chevrolet Monte Carlo	66	Elliott Sadler	Gary Bechtel	Sandy Jones
Excel Motorsports	Chevrolet Monte Carlo	56	Jeff Krogh	Molly Krogh	Jimmy Elledge
Excel Motorsports	Chevrolet Monte Carlo	80	Mark Krogh	Robert Krogh	Dan Glauz
Hensley Motorsports	Chevrolet Monte Carlo	63	Tracy Leslie	Hubert Hensley	Jeff Hensley
Innovative Motorsports	Chevrolet Monte Carlo	47	Andy Santerre (R)	George DeBidart	Kevin Caldwell
J&J Racing	Chevrolet Monte Carlo	99	Glenn Allen Jr.	Bill Papke	John Monsam
Joe Bessey Motorsports	Chevrolet Monte Carlo	6	Joe Bessey	Nancy Bessey	Harold Holly
Joe Gibbs Racing	Pontiac Grand Prix	44	Bobby Labonte	Joe Gibbs	Bryant Frazier
Joe Gibbs Racing	Pontiac Grand Prix	44	Tony Stewart	Joe Gibbs	Bryant Frazier
Keystone Motorsports	Chevrolet Monte Carlo	20	Blaise Alexander (R)	Alex Crestinger	Alex Crestinger
Lone Star Motorsports	Chevrolet Monte Carlo	88	Kevin Schwantz (R)	Kevin Schwantz	C. R. Miller
Mark III Racing	Chevrolet Monte Carlo	78	Hank Parker Jr. (R)	Dan Browder	Neil Browder
Martin Motorsports	Chevrolet Monte Carlo	92	Derrike Cope/David Green	Mac Martin	Tim Weiss
Michael Waltrip Racing	Ford Taurus	14	Patty Moise	Buffy Waltrip	Ronnie Silver
Michael Waltrip Racing	Ford Taurus	21	Michael Waltrip	Buffy Waltrip	Unknown
NorthStar Motorsports	Chevrolet Monte Carlo	89	Stanton Barrett	Meredith Ruark	Mike Yoder
Parker Racing	Chevrolet Monte Carlo	72	Mike Dillon	Ron Parker	Dean Johnson
Phil Parsons Racing	Chevrolet Monte Carlo	10	Phil Parsons	Marcia Parsons	Gene Nead
Phoenix Racing	Chevrolet Monte Carlo	4	Jeff Purvis	James Finch	Johnny Allen
Progressive Motorsports	Chevrolet Monte Carlo	57	Jason Keller	Steve DeSouza	Jamie Jones
PRW Racing	Ford Taurus	77	Ed Berrier	Tony Hall	Jimmy Means
Reiser Enterprises	Chevrolet Monte Carlo	17	Matt Kenseth	Robbie Reiser	Robbie Reiser
Roush Racing	Ford Taurus	9	Jeff Burton	Jack Roush	Tommy Morgan
Roush Racing	Ford Taurus	60	Mark Martin	Jack Roush	Bobby Leslie
Shoemaker Racing	Chevrolet Monte Carlo	64	Dick Trickle	Dennis Shoemaker	Bryan Schaffer
Specialty Racing	Chevrolet Monte Carlo	40	Kevin Lepage	Doug Taylor	Doug Taylor
ST Motorsports	Chevrolet Monte Carlo	59	Robert Pressley	Tad Geschickter	Steve Plattenberger
Stegall Motorsports	Chevrolet Monte Carlo	85	Shane Hall	Don Stegall	John Finley
Team 34	Chevrolet Monte Carlo	30	Mike Cope (R)	Jeffrey Welliver	Donnie Richeson
Team 34	Chevrolet Monte Carlo	34	Mike McLaughlin	Frank Cicci	Gary Cogswell
Team 34	Pontiac Grand Prix	36	Matt Hutter (R)	Scott Welliver	Clyde McLeod
Team Amick	Chevrolet Monte Carlo	35	Lyndon Amick	Bill Amick	Buddy Barnes
Washington-Erving Motorsports	Ford Taurus	50	Jimmy Foster	Joe Washington	Darrell Bryant

== Races ==
=== NAPA Auto Parts 300 ===
The NAPA Auto Parts 300 was held February 14 at Daytona International Speedway. Mike McLaughlin won the pole. The race was broadcast on CBS.

Top ten results

1. 87-Joe Nemechek
2. 4-Jeff Purvis
3. 60-Mark Martin
4. 00-Buckshot Jones
5. 74-Randy LaJoie
6. 17-Matt Kenseth
7. 21-Michael Waltrip
8. 88-Kevin Schwantz
9. 12-Jimmy Spencer
10. 10-Phil Parsons

Failed to qualify: Hank Parker Jr. (#78), Lyndon Amick (#35), Patty Moise (#14), Larry Pearson (#55), Ron Barfield Jr. (#2), Jimmy Foster (#50), Derrike Cope (#92), Blaise Alexander (#20), Doug Reid III (#97), Dale Shaw (#48), Lance Hooper (#23), Chris Diamond (#68), Mark Day (#16)

- Larry Pearson replaced Dale Jarrett and Bobby Labonte in the No. 32 in the race, after failing to qualify his No. 55. Dale Jarrett and the No. 32 team were about to be DNQ for this event so the team decided to put Bobby Labonte in the car so he could get the car into the race with a past champions provisional. In doing so, they inadvertly bumped Larry Pearson and his No. 55 from the field. Perhaps they felt bad about it and realized they could get the same provisional with Pearson, so the team made a deal for Pearson to drive the No. 32 in the race instead of Labonte.
- Dale Earnhardt Jr. had a blowover with Dick Trickle after Trickle turned him.

=== GM Goodwrench Service Plus 200 ===
The GM Goodwrench Service Plus 200 was held February 21 at North Carolina Speedway. Tony Stewart won the pole. The race was broadcast on TNN.

Top ten results

1. 17-Matt Kenseth
2. 44-Tony Stewart
3. 60-Mark Martin
4. 9-Jeff Burton
5. 34-Mike McLaughlin
6. 66-Elliott Sadler
7. 74-Randy LaJoie
8. 72-Mike Dillon
9. 37-Mark Green
10. 57-Jason Keller

Failed to qualify: Patty Moise (#14), Jimmy Foster (#50), Dale Shaw (#48), Lance Hooper (#23), Ed Berrier (#77), J. D. Gibbs (#42), Kevin Cywinski (#11), Stanton Barrett (#89), Bobby Hillin Jr. (#8), Rick Fuller (#40), Michael Ritch (#58)

- This was Kenseth's first career Busch Series victory.

=== Sam's Town Las Vegas 300 ===
The Sam's Town Las Vegas 300 was held February 28 at Las Vegas Motor Speedway. Mark Martin won the pole. The race was broadcast on ESPN.

Top ten results

1. 12-Jimmy Spencer
2. 3-Dale Earnhardt Jr.
3. 87-Joe Nemechek
4. 9-Jeff Burton
5. 32-Dale Jarrett
6. 60-Mark Martin
7. 72-Mike Dillon
8. 00-Buckshot Jones
9. 29-Hermie Sadler
10. 77-Ed Berrier

Failed to qualify: Hank Parker Jr. (#78), Lyndon Amick (#35), Ron Barfield Jr. (#2), Chris Diamond (#68), Bobby Hillin Jr. (#8), Rick Fuller (#04), Dale Fischlein (#70), Brendan Gaughan (#31)

- Randy LaJoie flipped on the final lap of the race.

=== BellSouth Mobility / Opryland 320 ===
The BellSouth Mobility / Opryland 320 was held March 15 at Nashville Speedway USA. Casey Atwood won the pole, becoming the youngest pole winner in NASCAR Busch Series history. The race was broadcast on TNN.

Top ten results

1. 34-Mike McLaughlin
2. 28-Casey Atwood
3. 3-Dale Earnhardt Jr.
4. 74-Randy LaJoie
5. 57-Jason Keller
6. 87-Joe Nemechek
7. 1-Sterling Marlin
8. 33-Tim Fedewa
9. 64-Dick Trickle
10. 38-Elton Sawyer

Failed to qualify: Hank Parker Jr. (#78), Chris Diamond (#68), Mark Day (#16), Brad Loney (#45), Mike Stefanik (#96), Jeff Krogh (#56), Mark Krogh (#80), Derrick Gilcrest (#12)

=== Diamond Hill Plywood 200 ===
The Diamond Hill Plywood 200 was held March 21 at Darlington Raceway. Jeff Burton won the pole. The race was broadcast on ESPN.

Top ten results

1. 44-Bobby Labonte
2. 9-Jeff Burton
3. 64-Dick Trickle
4. 17-Matt Kenseth
5. 66-Elliott Sadler
6. 72-Mike Dillon
7. 29-Hermie Sadler
8. 34-Mike McLaughlin
9. 59-Robert Pressley
10. 3-Dale Earnhardt Jr.

Failed to qualify: Ron Barfield Jr. (#2), Jeff Fuller (#7), Patty Moise (#14), Jimmy Foster (#50), Dave Blaney (#93), Mike Stefanik (#96)

=== Moore's Snacks 250 ===
The Moore's Snacks 250 was held March 28 at Bristol Motor Speedway. Dale Earnhardt Jr. won the pole. The race was broadcast on ESPN.

Top ten results

1. 66-Elliott Sadler
2. 3-Dale Earnhardt Jr.
3. 17-Matt Kenseth
4. 38-Elton Sawyer
5. 57-Jason Keller
6. 34-Mike McLaughlin
7. 10-Phil Parsons
8. 89-Stanton Barrett
9. 99-Glenn Allen Jr.
10. 14-Patty Moise

Failed to qualify: Robert Pressley (#59), Hank Parker Jr. (#78), Derrike Cope (#92), Lyndon Amick (#35)-Withdrew, Kevin Schwantz (#88)-Withdrew

=== Coca-Cola 300 ===
The Coca-Cola 300 was held April 4 at Texas Motor Speedway. Elliott Sadler won the pole. The race was broadcast on CBS.

Top ten results

1. 3-Dale Earnhardt Jr.
2. 66-Elliott Sadler
3. 87-Joe Nemechek
4. 10-Phil Parsons
5. 56-Jeff Krogh
6. 74-Randy LaJoie
7. 37-Mark Green
8. 17-Matt Kenseth
9. 2-Jeff Green
10. 9-Jeff Burton

Failed to qualify: Robert Pressley (#59), Hank Parker Jr. (#78), Dick Trickle (#64), Kevin Schwantz (#88), Mark Day (#16), Bobby Hillin Jr. (#8), Tom Lorenz (#62), Ted Smokstad (#48)

- This was Dale Earnhardt Jr.'s first career Busch Series win.

=== Galaxy Food Centers 300 ===
The final Galaxy Food Centers 300 was held April 11 at Hickory Motor Speedway. Robert Pressley won the pole. The race was broadcast on TNN.

Top ten results

1. 77-Ed Berrier
2. 29-Hermie Sadler
3. 33-Tim Fedewa
4. 72-Mike Dillon
5. 17-Matt Kenseth
6. 59-Robert Pressley
7. 30-Mike Cope
8. 3-Dale Earnhardt Jr.
9. 85-Shane Hall
10. 57-Jason Keller

Failed to qualify: Hank Parker Jr. (#78), Kevin Lepage (#40), Blaise Alexander (#20), Patty Moise (#14), Chris Diamond (#68), Johnny Chapman (#21), Johnny Rumley (#96), Shane Jenkins (#49), Randy Porter (#48), Eddie Beahr (#39)

- This would be the first and only NASCAR victory of Berrier's career.

=== Touchstone Energy 300 ===
The Touchstone Energy 300 was held April 25 at Talladega Superspeedway. Joe Nemechek won the pole. The race was broadcast on ABC.

Top ten results

1. 87-Joe Nemechek
2. 10-Phil Parsons
3. 34-Mike McLaughlin
4. 00-Buckshot Jones
5. 64-Dick Trickle
6. 99-Glenn Allen Jr.
7. 78-Loy Allen Jr.
8. 17-Matt Kenseth
9. 36-Matt Hutter
10. 38-Elton Sawyer

Failed to qualify: Patty Moise (#14), Doug Reid III (#7), Robert Pressley (#59), Mark Day (#16), Rick Wilson (#50)

- During the race, Dave Blaney

got spun around and flipped onto its side and slammed the wall with his roof. He walked away with no injuries.

=== Gumout Long Life Formula 200 ===
The Gumout Long Life Formula 200 was held May 9 at New Hampshire International Speedway. Joe Bessey won the pole. The race was broadcast on TNN.

Top ten results

1. 00-Buckshot Jones
2. 44-Tony Stewart
3. 40-Kevin Lepage
4. 4-Jeff Purvis
5. 74-Randy LaJoie
6. 99-Glenn Allen Jr.
7. 34-Mike McLaughlin
8. 52-Kevin Grubb
9. 59-Robert Pressley
10. 3-Dale Earnhardt Jr.

Failed to qualify: Mike Olsen (#61), Joey McCarthy (#41), Tom Bolles (#76), Brian Simo (#03)

=== First Union 200 ===
The First Union 200 was held May 17 at Nazareth Speedway. Dale Earnhardt Jr. won the pole. The race was broadcast on ESPN.

Top ten results

1. 33-Tim Fedewa
2. 4-Jeff Purvis
3. 34-Mike McLaughlin
4. 17-Matt Kenseth
5. 6-Joe Bessey
6. 77-Ed Berrier
7. 57-Jason Keller
8. 66-Elliott Sadler
9. 99-Glenn Allen Jr.
10. 13-Ted Christopher

Failed to qualify: none

=== Carquest Auto Parts 300 ===
The Carquest Auto Parts 300 was held May 23 at Lowe's Motor Speedway. Bobby Labonte won the pole. The race was broadcast on TBS.

Top ten results

1. 60-Mark Martin
2. 87-Joe Nemechek
3. 12-Jimmy Spencer
4. 21-Michael Waltrip
5. 17-Matt Kenseth
6. 44-Bobby Labonte
7. 34-Mike McLaughlin
8. 38-Elton Sawyer
9. 8-Bobby Hillin Jr.
10. 29-Hermie Sadler

Failed to qualify: Derrike Cope (#92), Loy Allen Jr. (#78), Lyndon Amick (#35), Matt Hutter (#36), Blaise Alexander (#20), Mike Cope (#30), Kenny Irwin Jr. (#48), Kelly Denton (#75), Mark Krogh (#80), Andy Santerre (#47), Gary Laton (#46)

=== MBNA Platinum 200 ===
The MBNA Platinum 200 was held May 30 at Dover International Speedway. Kevin Lepage won the pole. The race was broadcast on TNN.

Top ten results

1. 3-Dale Earnhardt Jr.
2. 8-Bobby Hillin Jr.
3. 44-Tony Stewart
4. 32-Dale Jarrett
5. 34-Mike McLaughlin
6. 59-Robert Pressley
7. 10-Phil Parsons
8. 38-Elton Sawyer
9. 57-Jason Keller
10. 21-Michael Waltrip

Failed to qualify: Bryan Wall (#73), Hal Browning (#46)

=== Hardee's 250 ===
The Hardee's 250 was held June 5 at Richmond International Raceway. Wayne Grubb won the pole. The race was broadcast on ESPN2.

Top ten results

1. 9-Jeff Burton
2. 3-Dale Earnhardt Jr.
3. 17-Matt Kenseth
4. 83-Wayne Grubb
5. 60-Mark Martin
6. 57-Jason Keller
7. 40-Kevin Lepage
8. 64-Dick Trickle
9. 52-Kevin Grubb
10. 59-Robert Pressley

Failed to qualify: Dale Jarrett (#32), Jeff Krogh (#56), J. D. Gibbs (#42), Blaise Alexander (#20), Ted Christopher (#13), Derrike Cope (#92), Patty Moise (#14), Joey McCarthy (#41), Mike Laughlin Jr. (#45), Mike Olsen (#61), Derrick Gilcrest (#12)

=== Lycos.com 250 ===
The inaugural Lycos.com 250 was held June 14 at Pikes Peak International Raceway. Matt Kenseth won the pole. The race was broadcast on ESPN.

Top ten results

1. 17-Matt Kenseth
2. 10-Phil Parsons
3. 74-Randy LaJoie
4. 38-Elton Sawyer
5. 4-Jeff Purvis
6. 63-Curtis Markham
7. 37-Mark Green
8. 59-Ron Hornaday Jr.
9. 30-Mike Cope
10. 3-Dale Earnhardt Jr.

Failed to qualify: none

=== Lysol 200 ===
The Lysol 200 was held June 28 at Watkins Glen International. Boris Said won the pole. The race was broadcast on ESPN.

Top ten results

1. 87-Ron Fellows
2. 34-Mike McLaughlin
3. 9-Ashton Lewis
4. 36-David Green
5. 72-Mike Dillon
6. 40-Jack Sprague
7. 33-Tim Fedewa
8. 3-Dale Earnhardt Jr.
9. 2-Ricky Craven
10. 57-Jason Keller

Failed to qualify: Mark Krogh (#80), John Preston (#55), Rick Bell (#78), Kat Teasdale (#54), Patty Moise (#14), Dale Quarterley (#32N)

- With his victory, Fellows became the first Non-American winner in the NASCAR Busch series.

=== DieHard 250 ===
The DieHard 250 was held July 5 at The Milwaukee Mile. Jeff Purvis won the pole. The race was broadcast on TNN.

Top ten results

1. 3-Dale Earnhardt Jr.
2. 38-Elton Sawyer
3. 4-Jeff Purvis
4. 36-David Green
5. 17-Matt Kenseth
6. 34-Mike McLaughlin
7. 00-Buckshot Jones
8. 33-Tim Fedewa
9. 6-Joe Bessey
10. 74-Randy LaJoie

Failed to qualify: none

=== Myrtle Beach 250 ===
The Myrtle Beach 250 was held July 11 at Myrtle Beach Speedway. Tim Fedewa won the pole. The race was broadcast on TNN.

Top ten results

1. 74-Randy LaJoie
2. 36-David Green
3. 34-Mike McLaughlin
4. 35-Lyndon Amick
5. 3-Dale Earnhardt Jr.
6. 33-Tim Fedewa
7. 6-Joe Bessey
8. 17-Matt Kenseth
9. 37-Mark Green
10. 66-Elliott Sadler

Failed to qualify: Bobby Hillin Jr. (#8), Kevin Prince (#90), Johnny Chapman (#73), Blaise Alexander (#20), Patty Moise (#14), Jimmy Foster (#50), Mark Krogh (#80), Eddie Beahr (#39)

=== Kenwood Home & Car Audio 300 ===
The Kenwood Home & Car Audio 300 was held July 19 at California Speedway. Robert Pressley won the pole. The race was broadcast on ESPN.

Top ten results

1. 3-Dale Earnhardt Jr.
2. 40-Kevin Lepage
3. 17-Matt Kenseth
4. 10-Phil Parsons
5. 36-David Green
6. 4-Jeff Purvis
7. 66-Elliott Sadler
8. 56-Mark Krogh
9. 6-Joe Bessey
10. 72-Mike Dillon

Failed to qualify: none

- Jack Sprague was scheduled to drive the No. 44 car, but he was injured after a crash in practice, so he was replaced by J.D. Gibbs in the race.

=== Lycos.com 300 Presented by Valleydale Foods ===
The Lycos.com 300 Presented by Valleydale Foods was held July 25 at South Boston Speedway. Dale Earnhardt Jr. won the pole. The race was broadcast on TNN.

Top ten results

1. 33-Tim Fedewa
2. 74-Randy LaJoie
3. 34-Mike McLaughlin
4. 36-David Green
5. 30-Todd Bodine
6. 63-Curtis Markham
7. 66-Elliott Sadler
8. 85-Shane Hall
9. 35-Lyndon Amick
10. 59-Kevin Lepage

Failed to qualify: Kevin Prince (#90), Ashton Lewis (#89), Mark Krogh (#80), Jeff Krogh (#56), Jim Bown (#78), Toby Robertson (#12), Patty Moise (#14), Kelly Denton (#75), Johnny Chapman (#73), Casey Atwood (#27)

- Mark Green and Jeff Purvis had been racing hard, making contact several times. After Green spun Purvis out, Purvis rammed Green's car on pit road. That forced him out of the race. NASCAR would suspend Purvis for the next 4 races.

=== Kroger 200 ===
The Kroger 200 was held July 31 at Indianapolis Raceway Park. Buckshot Jones won the pole. The race was broadcast on ESPN.

Top ten results

1. 3-Dale Earnhardt Jr.
2. 66-Elliott Sadler
3. 00-Buckshot Jones
4. 74-Randy LaJoie
5. 36-David Green
6. 17-Matt Kenseth
7. 21-Mike Bliss
8. 38-Elton Sawyer
9. 15-Mike Wallace
10. 8-Bobby Hillin Jr.

Failed to qualify: Brad Noffsinger (#43), Mark McFarland (#82), Mark Day (#16), Stevie Reeves (#54), Kenneth Nichols (#94)

- This race marked the debut of Jimmie Johnson in NASCAR.

=== Pepsi 200 presented by Devilbiss ===
The Pepsi 200 presented by Devilbiss was held August 15 at Michigan International Speedway. Jeff Burton won the pole. The race was broadcast on ESPN.

Top ten results

1. 9-Jeff Burton
2. 44-Bobby Labonte
3. 17-Matt Kenseth
4. 40-Kevin Lepage
5. 3-Dale Earnhardt Jr.
6. 60-Mark Martin
7. 8-Bobby Hillin Jr.
8. 38-Elton Sawyer
9. 21-Michael Waltrip
10. 12-Rick Mast

Failed to qualify: Dave Blaney (#93), Dale Fischlein (#70), J. D. Gibbs (#42), Kevin Schwantz (#88), Lyndon Amick (#35), Gary Laton (#46), Casey Atwood (#27)

- This would be the last time that all drivers were still running at the end of the race until the Sparks 300 at Talladega Superspeedway in 2022.
- This was also the last caution-free race in the Busch Series.

=== Food City 250 ===
The Food City 250 was held August 21 at Bristol Motor Speedway. Steve Grissom won the pole. The race was broadcast on ESPN.

Top ten results

1. 40-Kevin Lepage
2. 10-Phil Parsons
3. 32-Dale Jarrett
4. 30-Todd Bodine
5. 33-Tim Fedewa
6. 15-Ken Schrader
7. 83-Wayne Grubb
8. 00-Buckshot Jones
9. 4-Nathan Buttke
10. 36-David Green

Failed to qualify: Michael Waltrip (#21), Lyndon Amick (#35), Greg Marlowe (#78), Mark Day (#16)

- This was Lepage's final career Busch Series victory.

=== Dura-Lube 200 Presented by BI-LO ===
The Dura-Lube 200 presented by BI-LO was held September 5 at Darlington Raceway. Mike McLaughlin won the pole. The race was broadcast on ESPN.

Top ten results

1. 64-Dick Trickle
2. 3-Dale Earnhardt Jr.
3. 34-Mike McLaughlin
4. 40-Kevin Lepage
5. 30-Todd Bodine
6. 17-Matt Kenseth
7. 32-Dale Jarrett
8. 60-Mark Martin
9. 59-Robert Pressley
10. 15-Ken Schrader

Failed to qualify: Jeff Green (#92), Kelly Denton (#75), Ron Barfield Jr. (#2)

- Jeff Burton qualified the No. 9 car for Chad Little.
- With his victory, Trickle became the oldest winner in Busch Series history, at the age of 56 years, 10 months, and 9 days.
- This was Trickle's final career Busch Series victory.

=== Autolite Platinum 250 ===
The Autolite Platinum 250 was held September 11 at Richmond International Raceway. Andy Santerre won the pole. The race was broadcast on ESPN.

Top ten results

1. 3-Dale Earnhardt Jr.
2. 9-Jeff Burton
3. 12-Jimmy Spencer
4. 17-Matt Kenseth
5. 30-Todd Bodine
6. 4-Jeff Purvis
7. 40-Kevin Lepage
8. 64-Dick Trickle
9. 99-Glenn Allen Jr.
10. 47-Andy Santerre

Failed to qualify: Bobby Hamilton Jr. (#95), Dave Rezendes (#78), Casey Atwood (#50), Kevin Schwantz (#88), Ward Burton (#14), Mark Krogh (#80), Mario Gosselin (#71), Ted Christopher (#13), Mark McFarland (#82), J. D. Gibbs (#42)

- Steve Grissom qualified No. 12 for Jimmy Spencer.

=== MBNA Gold 200 ===
The MBNA Gold 200 was held September 19 at Dover International Speedway. Kevin Grubb won the pole. The race was broadcast on TNN.

Top ten results

1. 17-Matt Kenseth
2. 52-Kevin Grubb
3. 38-Elton Sawyer
4. 34-Mike McLaughlin
5. 30-Todd Bodine
6. 93-Dave Blaney
7. 4-Jeff Purvis
8. 3-Dale Earnhardt Jr.
9. 2-Ricky Craven
10. 21-Michael Waltrip

Failed to qualify: none

- Tracy Leslie replaced Hal Browning in the #46 in the race.

=== All Pro Bumper to Bumper 300 ===
The All Pro Bumper to Bumper 300 was held October 3 at Charlotte Motor Speedway. Dave Blaney won the pole. The race was broadcast on TBS.

Top ten results

1. 34-Mike McLaughlin
2. 17-Matt Kenseth
3. 3-Dale Earnhardt Jr.
4. 12-Jimmy Spencer
5. 00-Buckshot Jones
6. 9-Jeff Burton
7. 40-Kevin Lepage
8. 92-Todd Bodine
9. 4-Jeff Purvis
10. 1-Sterling Marlin

Failed to qualify: Bobby Hillin Jr. (#8), Patty Moise (#14), Toby Porter (#91), Ashton Lewis (#89), Kelly Denton (#75), Jeff Green (#92), Lance Hooper (#23), Jim Bown (#51), Jason Jarrett (#11), Lyndon Amick (#35), Kevin Grubb (#43), Kerry Earnhardt (#04), Matt Hutter (#24), Wayne Grubb (#83), Andy Santerre (#47), Hank Parker Jr. (#53), Rich Bickle (#??)

=== Carquest Auto Parts 250 ===
The Carquest Auto Parts 250 was held October 17 at Gateway International Raceway. Shane Hall won the pole. The race was broadcast on CBS.

Top ten results

1. 3-Dale Earnhardt Jr.
2. 17-Matt Kenseth
3. 4-Jeff Purvis
4. 47-Andy Santerre
5. 44-Tony Stewart
6. 93-Dave Blaney
7. 74-Randy LaJoie
8. 85-Shane Hall
9. 30-Todd Bodine
10. 40-Kevin Lepage

Failed to qualify: Tracy Leslie (#2), Joey McCarthy (#41), Eric Bodine (#1), Mel Walen (#58), J. D. Gibbs (#42)

=== AC Delco 200 ===
The AC Delco 200 was held October 31 at North Carolina Speedway. Tony Stewart won the pole. The race was broadcast on TNN.

Top ten results

1. 66-Elliott Sadler
2. 40-Kevin Lepage
3. 29-Hermie Sadler
4. 52-Kevin Grubb
5. 84-Philip Morris
6. 53-Hank Parker Jr.
7. 72-Mike Dillon
8. 8-Bobby Hillin Jr.
9. 33-Tim Fedewa
10. 63-Curtis Markham

Failed to qualify: Tracy Leslie (#97), J. D. Gibbs (#42), Jeff Green (#92), Mike Wallace (#50), Bryan Wall (#73), Scott Hansen (#09), Lyndon Amick (#35), Matt Hutter (#55), Ted Christopher (#13), Chuck Bown (#51), Jeff Finley (#79), Mark Day (#16)

=== Stihl 300 ===
The Stihl 300 was originally scheduled for 7th March 1998 but was held November 7 at Atlanta Motor Speedway after it and the Winston Cup Series Primestar 500 were both rained out. Dick Trickle won the pole. The race was broadcast on ESPN.

Top ten results

1. 60-Mark Martin
2. 3-Dale Earnhardt Jr.
3. 44-Tony Stewart
4. 17-Matt Kenseth
5. 00-Buckshot Jones
6. 52-Kevin Grubb
7. 87-Joe Nemechek
8. 10-Phil Parsons
9. 21-Michael Waltrip
10. 15-Ken Schrader

Failed to qualify: Tracy Leslie (#97), Lyndon Amick (#35), Hut Stricklin (#92), Gary Bradberry (#86), Curtis Markham (#89), Randy MacDonald (#7), Nathan Buttke (#78), Ken Bouchard (#50), Jeff Finley (#79), Morgan Shepherd (#07)

=== Jiffy Lube Miami 300 ===
The Jiffy Lube Miami 300 was held November 15 at Homestead-Miami Speedway. Casey Atwood won the pole. The race was broadcast on ESPN.

Top ten results

1. 9-Jeff Burton
2. 12-Jimmy Spencer
3. 60-Mark Martin
4. 17-Matt Kenseth
5. 36-David Green
6. 93-Dave Blaney
7. 26-Johnny Benson
8. 99-Glenn Allen Jr.
9. 74-Randy LaJoie
10. 33-Tim Fedewa

Failed to qualify: Chuck Bown (#92), Ted Christopher (#13), Jeff Krogh (#56), Patty Moise (#14), John Preston (#89), Nathan Buttke (#78), Kevin Schwantz (#88), Morgan Shepherd (#07), Philip Morris (#84), Hank Parker Jr. (#53), Lyndon Amick (#35), Freddie Query (#7), Gus Wasson (#49), Mark Krogh (#80)

== Full Drivers' Championship ==
(key) Bold – Pole position awarded by time. Italics – Pole position set by owner's points. * – Most laps led.

Pos	Driver	DAY	CAR	LVS	NSV	DAR	BRI	TEX	HCY	TAL	NHA	NAZ	CLT	DOV	RCH	PPR	GLN	MIL	MYB	CAL	SBO	IRP	MCH	BRI	DAR	RCH	DOV	CLT	GTY	CAR	ATL	HOM	Pts
1	Dale Earnhardt Jr.	37	16	2	3	10	**2**	1	8	32	10	**28**	30	1*	2*	10	8	1*	5	1*	**13***	1*	5	15	2	1*	8	3*	1	14	2*	42	4469
2	Matt Kenseth	6	1	24	33	4	3	8	5	8	16	4	5	40	3	**1***	17	5	8	3	12	6	3	34	6	4	1*	2	2	27	4	4	4421
3	Mike McLaughlin	**18**	5	27	1	8	6	11	21	3	7	3	7	5	34	20	2	6	3	24	3	18	15	17	**3***	28	4	1	12	41	29	18	4045
4	Randy LaJoie	5	7	18	4	23	25	6	23	23	5	42	14	11	11	3	37	10	1*	16	2	4	16	31	19	30	37	29	7	30	41	9	3543
5	Elton Sawyer	28	14	30	10	11	4	27	27	10	27	36	8	8	18	4	11	2	11	12	25	8	8	18	12	33	3	13	38	32	13	26	3533
6	Phil Parsons	10	40	37	38	13	7	4	18	2	15	16	35	7	16	2	25	11	21	4	11	34	18	2	25	27	11	31	14	24	8	13	3525
7	Tim Fedewa	20	18	19	8	34	34	13	3	27	11	1*	18	17	15	35	7	8	**6**	17	1	38	32	5	26	21	15	30	18	9	27	10	3515
8	Elliott Sadler	36	6	14	11	5	1	**2**	14	41	31	8	41	21	26	19	26	19	10	7	7	2	29	32	13	13	22	23	13	1	37	36	3470
9	Buckshot Jones	4	15	8	13	14	28*	28	12	4	1	33	29	19	30	18	29	7	15	11	17	**3**	14	8	42	36	41	5	31	35	5	16	3453
10	Hermie Sadler	12	12	9	24	7	20	35	2	13	33	18	10	25	14	16	34	13	12	20	18	21	31	13	14	24	31	25	34	3	26	19	3340
11	Glenn Allen Jr.	30	29	17	15	22	9	22	15	6	6	9	28	18	27	23	19	22	30	18	14	27	27	26	21	9	18	22	10	16	43	8	3270
12	Mike Dillon	24	8	7	42	6	31	14	4	17	19	15	21	15	37	24	5	16	20	10	16	14	13	40	40	26	19	18	32	7	33	24	3250
13	Mark Green	14	9	16	34	17	17	7	22	35	20	11	15	16	21	7	33	32	9	19	21	28	38	20	28	19	23	39	21	40	12	22	3075
14	Kevin Lepage			13	29	21	14	40	DNQ	16	3	14	23	**13**	7			18		2	10	20	4	1	4	7	13	7		2	25	20	3052
15	Jeff Purvis	2	20	28	18	32	27	36		15	4	2	31	22	12	5	32	**3**	29	6	28					6	7	9	3*	19	35	12	3019
16	Jason Keller	16	10	33	5	33	5	26	10	11	12	7	38	9	6	33	10	36	33	27	33	16	28	38	41	20	20	33	37	22	22	35	2971
17	Ed Berrier	26	DNQ	10	36	30	43	16	1*	34	22	6	11	24	32	17	15	37	19	41	29	13	33	24	24	32	36	26	11	29	24	17	2772
18	Joe Bessey	40	30	12	12	36	37	43	25	21	**35***	5	19	28	17	28	28	9	7	9	19	31	34	33	27	23	16	28	35	42	16	30	2763
19	Shane Hall	25	27	43	27	18	19	30	9	12	14	20	32	29	24	25	23	33	26	29	8	37	41	30	39	16	14	27	**8**	33	28	21	2763
20	Andy Santerre **(R)**	25	25	26	16	37	11	19	29	38	17	34	DNQ	37	43	22	12	23	13	34	15	29	36	16	20	**10**	38	DNQ	4	23	21	40	2598
21	Tony Stewart	31	**2**	34	17		26	15	13	28	2			3		14		12	35			12		21	16	29		32	5	**18***	3	39	2455
22	Dick Trickle	23	11	22	9	3	13	DNQ	11	5*	13	12	20	12	8			41		39			11	39	1	8	42	34			**38**	43	2441
23	Tracy Leslie	33	13	23	19	38	12	18	28	19	32	37	16	31	31	26	16	20	17	31	22	30	43	11	22	15	32		DNQ	DNQ	DNQ		2338
24	Bobby Hillin Jr.	38	DNQ	DNQ	26	19	23	DNQ		26			9	2	19	34	36	21	DNQ	15	32	10	7	14	29	34	17	DNQ	17	8	30	25	2304
25	Jeff Krogh	43	28	21	DNQ	35	36	5	17	20	23	22	42	23	DNQ	13	42	28	18	30	DNQ	11	40	35	31	22	30	24	26	34	32	DNQ	2225
26	David Green				43	39				42							4	4	2	5	4	5	23	10	11	11	40	21	19	21	19	5	2180
27	Mark Martin	3	3	**6**		24		21		29			1*		5								6		8	35		43		11	1	3	1976
28	Mark Krogh	41	36	11	DNQ	26	32	20	30	39	28	17	DNQ	26	36	38	DNQ	40	DNQ	8	DNQ	24	26	28	33	DNQ	21	42	22	25	17	DNQ	1917
29	Dave Blaney **(R)**	35	42		14	DNQ	22	34		37			43	36	23			14				33	DNQ	29	18	12	6	**11**	6	20	14	6	1915
30	Jeff Burton	22	4*	4		**2***	39	10					22		1								**1***		QL	2		6		13		1	1883
31	Robert Pressley	34	17	38	31*	9	DNQ	DNQ	**6**	DNQ	9		26	6	10					**14**			19	19	9	37				15	31	37	1870
32	Blaise Alexander **(R)**	DNQ	23	25	21	12	35	33	DNQ	14	26	38	DNQ	38	DNQ	27	43	27	DNQ	35			20	41	37	42	26	40	33	31	39	23	1730
33	Todd Bodine																			33	5	15	12	4	5	5	5	8	9	12	15	38	1668
34	Michael Waltrip	7		20		41	29	17					4	10	20					23			9	DNQ	15	14	10	41			9		1667
35	Kevin Grubb **(R)**		22			15	24		26		8	43		20	9	30			32		27			25	32	38	**2**	DNQ	40	4	6		1660
36	Wayne Grubb **(R)**			36	23			41			18	21			**4**	15		25		13	24	19	21	7		39		DNQ	20			34	1546
37	Patty Moise	DNQ	DNQ	35	37	DNQ	10	39	DNQ	DNQ	39	19	17	32	DNQ	12	DNQ	30	DNQ	32	DNQ	23	42	36	36		33	DNQ	25	39	23	DNQ	1421
38	Casey Atwood **(R)**		21		**2**		40				21				13			24	28		DNQ		DNQ			DNQ	24	16	30	17	11	**14**	1359
39	Joe Nemechek	1*		3*	6			3*		**1**			2															36			7	28	1315
40	Mike Cope **(R)**	42	34	40	40	40	15	24	7	18	38	30	DNQ	33	33	9	35	26	31														1292
41	Dale Jarrett	QL		5			30	29					12	4	DNQ					37			17	3*	7		43	12			42		1284
42	Matt Hutter **(R)**	21	19	29	39	25	18	38	24	9	29	31	DNQ	30	41	37						36						DNQ		DNQ			1169
43	Jimmy Spencer	9		1				31		24			3													3		4				2*	1164
44	Lance Hooper **(R)**	DNQ	DNQ			27	16	25			41		24	39	39		21	17		25		17	30					DNQ			34		1059
45	Lyndon Amick	DNQ	26	DNQ	35	16	Wth			33			DNQ		22				4		9	22	DNQ	DNQ	43	31	27	DNQ	41	DNQ	DNQ	DNQ	1045
46	Ken Schrader														38								24	6	10	43	12	38		28	10	11	977
47	Jason Jarrett **(R)**		31		20	20			16	43	36		34				24		22		23					17		DNQ					935
48	Jeff Fuller					DNQ							25	35	40	11	18	29		40		32			38			15				15	899
49	Stanton Barrett	15	DNQ	15	30	31	8	23		40	34					31																29	865
50	Kevin Schwantz **(R)**	8	32	42	32	43	Wth	DNQ		31	24		39			21	39						DNQ			DNQ		35			40	DNQ	801
51	Curtis Markham															6	41		14		6	35				25			43	10	DNQ		785
52	Jeff Green							9				13	13	14	28									37	DNQ	18		DNQ		DNQ			668
53	Ashton Lewis																3				DNQ		39	42	23	41	25	DNQ	28	36			609
54	Bobby Labonte	QL				1							**6**		42								2				34						608
55	Nathan Buttke																						22	9	17		39		23	26	DNQ	DNQ	577
56	Mike Wallace	11					41															9			35			20		DNQ			569
57	Ricky Craven																9						25	22			9	37		43			547
58	Sterling Marlin				4					30			40											23				10					490
59	Dave Rezendes																14				30	26	35	12		DNQ	35	14					464
60	Brad Loney **(R)**	19	37	31	DNQ					36				34	35																		402
61	Ron Hornaday Jr.											23				8		35		22													391
62	Dale Fischlein	17		DNQ						25			27					38					DNQ										331
63	Brad Noffsinger												36	27		29				38		DNQ				40							305
64	J. D. Gibbs		DNQ			29									DNQ		31			36	20		DNQ			DNQ			DNQ	DNQ			304
65	Jim Bown		41			42							37						24		DNQ				34			DNQ					286
66	Hank Parker Jr.	DNQ	38	DNQ	DNQ	28	DNQ	DNQ	DNQ																			DNQ		6		DNQ	283
67	Jimmie Johnson																					25							15			33	275
68	Mark McFarland										37	29			29			34				DNQ				DNQ							265
69	Jimmy Foster	DNQ	DNQ	41	25	DNQ	42	37										39	DNQ														263
70	Mike Bliss																			26		7											231
71	Larry Pearson	32	33							22																							228
72	Kerry Earnhardt																		23		26							DNQ	39				225
73	Adam Petty																												27	38		27	213
74	Randy Porter				22		38		DNQ										34														207
75	Bobby Dotter										25							15															206
76	Kevin Cywinski		DNQ						19						25																		194
77	Steve Grissom																							**27**		QL		19					193
78	Ron Fellows																1*																185
79	Rich Bickle												33														28	DNQ				41	183
80	Loy Allen Jr.									7			DNQ	43																			180
81	Scott Lagasse																30		25														166
82	Philip Morris																													5		DNQ	160
83	Bobby Hamilton Jr.																									DNQ				37	20		160
84	Stevie Reeves	39	39		41						30											DNQ											159
85	Jack Sprague																6			QL													150
86	Johnny Benson																											17				7	146
87	Derrike Cope	DNQ	24				DNQ						DNQ		DNQ																36		146
88	Rick Mast																						10										134
89	Joey McCarthy										DNQ	35			DNQ												29		DNQ				134
90	Johnny Chapman								DNQ							43			DNQ	42	DNQ								24				128
91	Kyle Petty							12																									127
92	Mike Stefanik **(R)**		35	32	DNQ	DNQ						39																					125
93	John Andretti	13																															124
94	Perry Tripp															39													29				122
95	Dale Shaw	DNQ	DNQ	39																	31												116
96	Mario Gosselin																		16							DNQ							115
97	Scott Hansen																												16	DNQ			115
98	John Preston										40	32					DNQ															DNQ	110
99	Gus Wasson																														18	DNQ	109
100	Dennis Setzer								31		42			41																			107
101	Jack Baldwin																20																103
102	Andy Houston								20																								103
103	Kelly Denton						33						DNQ								DNQ			43	DNQ			DNQ					98
104	Ted Christopher										43	10			DNQ		13						37			DNQ				DNQ		DNQ	86
105	Rick Fuller	27	DNQ	DNQ																													82
106	Brian Smith																		27														82
107	Ron Barfield Jr.	DNQ		DNQ		DNQ	21													28					DNQ								79
108	Chad Little																								30								73
109	Kat Teasdale																DNQ	31															70
110	Barry Bodine																															31	70
111	Morgan Shepherd							32																							DNQ	DNQ	67
112	Jimmy Kitchens															32																	67
113	Mike Garvey																															32	67
114	Mark Day	DNQ			DNQ			DNQ		DNQ						36						DNQ		DNQ						DNQ			55
115	Eric Jones																												36				55
116	Alan Russell															40																	43
117	Boris Said																**40**																43
118	Doug Reid III	DNQ						42		DNQ																							37
119	Eddie Beahr								DNQ					42					DNQ														37
120	Joe Buford																												42				37
121	Gary Laton		43										DNQ										DNQ										34
122	Scot Walters																			43													34
123	Chad Chaffin				28																												
124	Kevin Prince																		DNQ		DNQ	39											
125	Doug Taylor															41																	
126	Rick Carelli															42																	
127	Bryan Wall											24		DNQ			22													DNQ			
128	Mike Olsen										DNQ	25			DNQ																		
129	Glenn Sullivan											26																					
130	Eric Bodine																27												DNQ				
131	Barney McRae											27																					
132	Joe Pezza																38																
133	Martin Truex Sr.											40																					
134	Ed Spencer III											41																					
135	Chris Diamond	DNQ		DNQ	DNQ				DNQ																								
136	Michael Ritch		DNQ																														
137	Brendan Gaughan			DNQ																													
138	Derrick Gilchrist				DNQ										DNQ																		
139	Tom Lorenz							DNQ																									
140	Ted Smokstad							DNQ																									
141	Shane Jenkins								DNQ																								
142	Johnny Rumley								DNQ																								
143	Rick Wilson									DNQ																							
144	Brian Simo										DNQ																						
145	Tom Belles										DNQ																						
146	Kenny Irwin Jr.												DNQ																				
147	Hal Browning													DNQ													QL						
148	Mike Laughlin Jr.														DNQ																		
149	Dale Quarterley																DNQ																
150	Rick Bell																DNQ																
151	Toby Robertson																				DNQ												
152	Kenneth Nichols																					DNQ											
153	Greg Marlowe																							DNQ									
154	Ward Burton																									DNQ							
155	Toby Porter																											DNQ					
156	Mel Walen																												DNQ				
157	Jeff Finley																													DNQ	DNQ		
158	Chuck Bown																													DNQ		DNQ	
159	Hut Stricklin																														DNQ		
160	Gary Bradberry																														DNQ		
161	Randy MacDonald																														DNQ		
162	Ken Bouchard																														DNQ		
162	Freddie Query																															DNQ	
Pos	Driver	DAY	CAR	LVS	NSV	DAR	BRI	TEX	HCY	TAL	NHA	NAZ	CLT	DOV	RCH	PPR	GLN	MIL	MYB	CAL	SBO	IRP	MCH	BRI	DAR	RCH	DOV	CLT	GTY	CAR	ATL	HOM	Pts

== Rookie of the Year ==
Andy Santerre, being the only full-time candidate for Rookie of the Year, walked away with the title after finishing 20th in points. 2nd-place-finisher Dave Blaney made his Busch Series debut in 1998, posting three sixth-place finishes over a 20-race stretch. He would be followed by Blaise Alexander, then Wayne and Kevin Grubb, both of whom grabbed their first career pole positions during the season. 18-year-old Casey Atwood ran a part-time schedule in an undeclared season but finished 38th in points. The next two competitors were Mike Cope and Matt Hutter, teammates at Cicci-Welliver Racing but released after a lack of performance. Part-time drivers Lance Hooper, Jason Jarrett, and MotoGP legend Kevin Schwantz rounded out the rookie class of 1998.

== See also ==
- 1998 NASCAR Winston Cup Series
- 1998 NASCAR Craftsman Truck Series
- 1998 NASCAR Winston West Series
- 1998 ARCA Bondo/Mar-Hyde Series
- 1998 NASCAR Goody's Dash Series
