= Chris Diamond =

American racing driver

- Born: December 30, 1963 (age 62); Hickory, North Carolina

NASCAR O'Reilly Auto Parts Series career
- 13 races run over 5 years
- Best finish: 65th (1997)
- First race: 1994 Sundrop 400 (Hickory)
- Last race: 1997 Kenwood Home & Car Audio 300 (California)
Wins	Top tens	Poles
0	0	0

Chris Diamond (born December 30, 1963) is an American professional former stock car racing driver.

== Racing career ==
Diamond has made thirteen NASCAR Busch Series starts. In his debut, he finished twentieth, eleven laps down.

== Motorsports career results ==
=== NASCAR ===
(key) (Bold – Pole position awarded by qualifying time. Italics – Pole position earned by points standings or practice time. * – Most laps led.)

==== Busch Series ====
NASCAR Busch Series results
Year	Team	No.	Make	1	2	3	4	5	6	7	8	9	10	11	12	13	14	15	16	17	18	19	20	21	22	23	24	25	26	27	28	29	30	31	NBSC	Pts	Ref
1994	Jerry Francis	68	Pontiac	DAY	CAR	RCH	ATL	MAR	DAR	HCY; 20	BRI	ROU; 32	NHA	NZH	CLT	DOV	MYB; DNQ	GLN	MLW	SBO	TAL	HCY; DNQ	IRP	MCH	BRI	DAR	RCH	DOV	CLT	MAR; 24	CAR				67th	261	
1995	Jerry Francis	68	Chevy	DAY	CAR	RCH	ATL	NSV; 40	DAR	BRI	HCY; DNQ	NHA	NZH	CLT	DOV	MYB; DNQ	GLN	MLW	TAL	SBO; 30	IRP; 32	MCH	BRI	DAR	RCH	DOV	CLT; DNQ	CAR	HOM; DNQ						74th	183	
1996	Jerry Francis	68	Chevy	DAY	CAR	RCH	ATL	NSV; DNQ	DAR	BRI	HCY; DNQ	NZH	CLT	DOV	SBO; 30	MYB	GLN	MLW	NHA	TAL	IRP; DNQ	MCH	BRI	DAR	RCH	DOV	CLT; DNQ	CAR; DNQ	HOM						92nd	73	
1997	Jerry Francis	68	Chevy	DAY; DNQ	CAR	RCH	ATL	LVS	DAR	HCY; DNQ	TEX	BRI; DNQ	NSV; 33	TAL	NHA	NZH	CLT; DNQ	DOV	SBO; 20	GLN	MLW; 34	MYB; DNQ	GTY; 31	IRP	MCH	BRI; DNQ	DAR; DNQ	RCH	DOV	CLT; DNQ	CAL; 38	CAR; DNQ	HOM		65th	353	
1997	Bobby Jones Racing	50	Pontiac																							BRI; 36									65th	353	
1998	Jerry Francis	68	Chevy	DAY; DNQ	CAR	LVS; DNQ	NSV; DNQ	DAR	BRI	TEX	HCY; DNQ	TAL	NHA	NZH	CLT	DOV	RCH	PPR	GLN	MLW	MYB	CAL	SBO	IRP	MCH	BRI	DAR	RCH	DOV	CLT	GTY	CAR	ATL	HOM	N/A	-	
