= Eric Bodine =

American racing driver

- Born: August 17, 1962 (age 64) Waverly, New York, U.S.

NASCAR Busch North Series career
- Debut season: 1994
- Wins: 0
- Poles: 0
- Best finish: 14th in 1999
- Finished last season: 14th (1999)
- Height: 6 ft (183 cm)
- Weight: 185 lb (84 kg)

NASCAR O'Reilly Auto Parts Series career
- 1 race run over 2 years
- 1998 position: N/A
- First race: 1998 Lysol 200 (Watkins Glen)
Wins	Top tens	Poles
0	0	0
- Statistics up to date as of July 13, 2020.

Eric Bodine (born August 17, 1962) is an American professional stock car racing driver. He drove a total of 78 races in the NASCAR Busch North Series (now the ARCA Menards Series East) in the mid and late 1990s, where he ran nearly full seasons. In addition, he made one start in the Busch Series at his home track of Watkins Glen in 1998. He is part of NASCAR's Bodine family as the uncle of Barry and cousin of Geoff, Brett, and Todd Bodine.

== Motorsports career results ==
=== NASCAR ===
(key) (Bold – Pole position awarded by qualifying time. Italics – Pole position earned by points standings or practice time. * – Most laps led.)

==== Busch Series ====
NASCAR Busch Series results
Year	Team	No.	Make	1	2	3	4	5	6	7	8	9	10	11	12	13	14	15	16	17	18	19	20	21	22	23	24	25	26	27	28	29	30	31	32	NBSC	Pts	Ref
1998	Bodine Motorsports	21	Chevy	DAY	CAR	LVS	NSV	DAR	BRI	TEX	HCY	TAL	NHA	NZH	CLT	DOV	RCH	PPR	GLN; 27	MLW	MYB	CAL	SBO	IRP	MCH	BRI	DAR	RCH	DOV	CLT								
1998	Bodine Motorsports	1	Chevy																												GTY; DNQ	CAR	ATL	HOM				
1999	Bodine Motorsports	21N	Chevy	DAY	CAR	LVS	ATL	DAR	TEX	NSV	BRI	TAL	CAL	NHA	RCH	NZH	CLT	DOV	SBO	GLN; DNQ	MLW	MYB	PPR	GTY	IRP	MCH	BRI	DAR	RCH	DOV	CLT	CAR	MEM	PHO	HOM	N/A	0	

==== Busch North Series ====
NASCAR Busch North Series results
Year	Team	No.	Make	1	2	3	4	5	6	7	8	9	10	11	12	13	14	15	16	17	18	19	20	21	22	NBNSC	Pts	Ref
1994	Bodine Motorsports	21	Chevy	NHA; DNS	NHA	MND	NZH	SPE; 26	HOL	GLN; 20	JEN; 29	EPP	GLN	NHA	WIS	STA	TMP	MND	WMM	RPS	LEE	NHA	LRP			45th	353	
1995	Bodine Motorsports	21	Chevy	DAY	NHA; 28	LEE; DNQ	JEN; DNQ	NHA	NZH	HOL	BEE	TMP; 28	GLN	NHA; 40	TIO; 29	MND	GLN; 5	EPP	RPS	LEE	STA	BEE	NHA; 29	TMP	LRP; DNQ	33rd	786	
1996	Bodine Motorsports	21	Chevy	DAY	LEE	JEN; 18	NZH	HOL; 14	NHA; 27	TIO; 13	BEE; 28	TMP; 17	NZH; 32	NHA; 39	STA	GLN; 23	EPP	RPS; 18	LEE; 19	NHA; 13	NHA; 33	BEE; 18	TMP; 29	LRP; 15		23rd	1589	
1997	Bodine Motorsports	21	Chevy	DAY	LEE; 18	JEN; 18	NHA; 14	NZH	HOL; 14	NHA; 18	STA; 19	BEE; 17	TMP; 21	NZH; 22	TIO; 13	NHA; 38	STA; 15	THU; 14	GLN; 29	EPP; 18	RPS; 22	BEE; 12	TMP; 18	NHA; 21	LRP; 27	16th	2096	
1998	Bodine Motorsports	21	Chevy	LEE; 17	RPS	NHA; 29	NZH	HOL; 22	GLN; 27	STA; 15	NHA; 23	DOV; 18	STA; 27	NHA; 20	GLN; 4	EPP; DNQ	JEN; 18	NHA; 22	THU; 21	TMP; 21	BEE; 19	LRP				19th	1700	
1999	Bodine Motorsports	21	Chevy	LEE; 18	RPS; 15	NHA; 25	TMP; 8	NZH	HOL; 11	BEE; 11	JEN; 11		STA; 10	NHA; 17	NZH; 18	STA; 11	NHA; 18	GLN; 11	EPP; 16	THU; 18	BEE; 19	NHA; 35	LRP; 32			14th	2014	
1999	Bodine Motorsports	21N	Chevy									GLN; DNQ														14th	2014	
