= 1991 Heinz Southern 500 =

21st race of the 1991 NASCAR Winston Cup Series

Race details
- Race 21 of 29 in the 1991 NASCAR Winston Cup Series
- The 1991 Heinz Southern 500 program cover, featuring Dale Earnhardt.
- Date: September 1, 1991
- Official name: 42nd Annual Heinz Southern 500
- Location: Darlington Raceway, Darlington, South Carolina
- Course: Permanent racing facility
- Course length: 1.366 miles (2.198 km)
- Distance: 367 laps, 501.322 mi (806.799 km)
- Average speed: 133.508 miles per hour (214.860 km/h)

Pole position
Driver	Davey Allison	Robert Yates Racing
- Time: 30.261

Most laps led
Driver	Harry Gant	Leo Jackson Motorsports
- Laps: 152

Winner
No. 33	Harry Gant	Leo Jackson Motorsports

Television in the United States
- Network: ESPN
- Announcers: Bob Jenkins, Ned Jarrett, Benny Parsons

Radio in the United States
- Radio: Motor Racing Network

The 1991 Heinz Southern 500 was the 21st stock car race of the 1991 NASCAR Winston Cup Series season and the 42nd iteration of the event. The race was held on Sunday, September 1, 1991, in Darlington, South Carolina, at Darlington Raceway, a 1.366 miles (2.198 km) permanent egg-shaped oval racetrack. The race took the scheduled 367 laps to complete. At race's end, Leo Jackson Motorsports driver Harry Gant would manage to dominate the late stages of the race, leading the final 70 laps of the race to take his 13th career NASCAR Winston Cup Series victory and his second victory of the season. To fill out the top three, Morgan–McClure Motorsports driver Ernie Irvan and Hendrick Motorsports driver Ken Schrader would finish second and third, respectively.

== Background ==
The layout of Darlington Raceway, the venue where the race was held.

Darlington Raceway is a race track built for NASCAR racing located near Darlington, South Carolina. It is nicknamed "The Lady in Black" and "The Track Too Tough to Tame" by many NASCAR fans and drivers and advertised as "A NASCAR Tradition." It is of a unique, somewhat egg-shaped design, an oval with the ends of very different configurations, a condition which supposedly arose from the proximity of one end of the track to a minnow pond the owner refused to relocate. This situation makes it very challenging for the crews to set up their cars' handling in a way that is effective at both ends.

=== Entry list ===
- (R) denotes rookie driver.

#	Driver	Team	Make
1	Rick Mast	Precision Products Racing	Oldsmobile
2	Rusty Wallace	Penske Racing South	Pontiac
3	Dale Earnhardt	Richard Childress Racing	Chevrolet
4	Ernie Irvan	Morgan–McClure Motorsports	Chevrolet
5	Ricky Rudd	Hendrick Motorsports	Chevrolet
6	Mark Martin	Roush Racing	Ford
7	Alan Kulwicki	AK Racing	Ford
8	Rick Wilson	Stavola Brothers Racing	Buick
9	Bill Elliott	Melling Racing	Ford
10	Derrike Cope	Whitcomb Racing	Chevrolet
11	Geoff Bodine	Junior Johnson & Associates	Ford
12	Hut Stricklin	Bobby Allison Motorsports	Buick
15	Morgan Shepherd	Bud Moore Engineering	Ford
17	Darrell Waltrip	Darrell Waltrip Motorsports	Chevrolet
19	Chad Little	Little Racing	Ford
21	Dale Jarrett	Wood Brothers Racing	Ford
22	Sterling Marlin	Junior Johnson & Associates	Ford
24	Dick Trickle	Team III Racing	Pontiac
25	Ken Schrader	Hendrick Motorsports	Chevrolet
26	Brett Bodine	King Racing	Buick
28	Davey Allison	Robert Yates Racing	Ford
30	Michael Waltrip	Bahari Racing	Pontiac
33	Harry Gant	Leo Jackson Motorsports	Oldsmobile
41	Larry Pearson	Larry Hedrick Motorsports	Chevrolet
42	Kyle Petty	SABCO Racing	Pontiac
43	Richard Petty	Petty Enterprises	Pontiac
47	Greg Sacks	Close Racing	Oldsmobile
48	James Hylton	Hylton Motorsports	Buick
52	Jimmy Means	Jimmy Means Racing	Pontiac
55	Ted Musgrave (R)	U.S. Racing	Pontiac
66	Lake Speed	Cale Yarborough Motorsports	Pontiac
68	Bobby Hamilton (R)	TriStar Motorsports	Oldsmobile
71	Dave Marcis	Marcis Auto Racing	Chevrolet
75	Joe Ruttman	RahMoc Enterprises	Oldsmobile
82	Mark Stahl	Stahl Racing	Ford
87	Randy Baker	Buck Baker Racing	Chevrolet
94	Terry Labonte	Hagan Racing	Oldsmobile
98	Jimmy Spencer	Travis Carter Enterprises	Chevrolet

== Qualifying ==
Qualifying was split into two rounds. The first round was held on Thursday, August 29, at 3:00 PM EST. Each driver would have one lap to set a time. During the first round, the top 20 drivers in the round would be guaranteed a starting spot in the race. If a driver was not able to guarantee a spot in the first round, they had the option to scrub their time from the first round and try and run a faster lap time in a second round qualifying run, held on Friday, August 30, at 2:00 PM EST. As with the first round, each driver would have one lap to set a time. For this specific race, positions 21-40 would be decided on time and depending on who needed it, a select amount of positions were given to cars who had not otherwise qualified on time but were high enough in owner's points; up to two provisionals were given. If needed, a past champion who did not qualify on either time or provisionals could use a champion's provisional, adding one more spot to the field.

Davey Allison, driving for Robert Yates Racing, would win the pole, setting a time of 30.261 and an average speed of 162.506 miles per hour (261.528 km/h) in the first round.

No drivers would fail to qualify,

=== Full qualifying results ===
Pos.	#	Driver	Team	Make	Time	Speed
1	28	Davey Allison	Robert Yates Racing	Ford	30.261	162.506
2	9	Bill Elliott	Melling Racing	Ford	30.480	161.339
3	3	Dale Earnhardt	Richard Childress Racing	Chevrolet	30.484	161.317
4	11	Geoff Bodine	Junior Johnson & Associates	Ford	30.499	161.238
5	33	Harry Gant	Leo Jackson Motorsports	Oldsmobile	30.574	160.843
6	4	Ernie Irvan	Morgan–McClure Motorsports	Chevrolet	30.580	160.811
7	7	Alan Kulwicki	AK Racing	Ford	30.584	160.790
8	21	Dale Jarrett	Wood Brothers Racing	Ford	30.622	160.590
9	25	Ken Schrader	Hendrick Motorsports	Chevrolet	30.688	160.245
10	6	Mark Martin	Roush Racing	Ford	30.773	159.802
11	15	Morgan Shepherd	Bud Moore Engineering	Ford	30.814	159.590
12	17	Darrell Waltrip	Darrell Waltrip Motorsports	Chevrolet	30.841	159.450
13	2	Rusty Wallace	Penske Racing South	Pontiac	30.894	159.177
14	24	Dick Trickle	Team III Racing	Pontiac	30.933	158.976
15	22	Sterling Marlin	Junior Johnson & Associates	Ford	30.963	158.822
16	42	Kyle Petty	SABCO Racing	Pontiac	30.976	158.755
17	10	Derrike Cope	Whitcomb Racing	Chevrolet	31.003	158.617
18	5	Ricky Rudd	Hendrick Motorsports	Chevrolet	31.006	158.602
19	41	Larry Pearson	Larry Hedrick Motorsports	Chevrolet	31.010	158.581
20	98	Jimmy Spencer	Travis Carter Enterprises	Chevrolet	31.028	158.489
Failed to lock in Round 1
21	68	Bobby Hamilton (R)	TriStar Motorsports	Oldsmobile	30.832	159.497
22	8	Rick Wilson	Stavola Brothers Racing	Buick	31.055	158.351
23	94	Terry Labonte	Hagan Racing	Oldsmobile	31.065	158.300
24	1	Rick Mast	Precision Products Racing	Oldsmobile	31.079	158.229
25	66	Lake Speed	Cale Yarborough Motorsports	Pontiac	31.124	158.000
26	12	Hut Stricklin	Bobby Allison Motorsports	Buick	31.153	157.853
27	26	Brett Bodine	King Racing	Buick	31.298	157.122
28	19	Chad Little	Little Racing	Ford	31.330	156.961
29	30	Michael Waltrip	Bahari Racing	Pontiac	31.342	156.901
30	43	Richard Petty	Petty Enterprises	Pontiac	31.388	156.671
31	55	Ted Musgrave (R)	U.S. Racing	Pontiac	31.393	156.646
32	75	Joe Ruttman	RahMoc Enterprises	Chevrolet	31.537	155.931
33	47	Greg Sacks	Close Racing	Oldsmobile	31.665	155.301
34	52	Jimmy Means	Jimmy Means Racing	Pontiac	31.782	154.729
35	87	Randy Baker	Buck Baker Racing	Chevrolet	31.802	154.632
36	71	Dave Marcis	Marcis Auto Racing	Chevrolet	32.225	152.602
37	82	Mark Stahl	Stahl Racing	Ford	33.801	145.487
38	48	James Hylton	Hylton Motorsports	Buick	34.329	143.249
Official first round qualifying results
Official starting lineup

== Race results ==
Fin	St	#	Driver	Team	Make	Laps	Led	Status	Pts	Winnings
1	5	33	Harry Gant	Leo Jackson Motorsports	Oldsmobile	367	152	running	185	$179,450
2	6	4	Ernie Irvan	Morgan–McClure Motorsports	Chevrolet	367	14	running	175	$40,525
3	9	25	Ken Schrader	Hendrick Motorsports	Chevrolet	367	0	running	165	$26,940
4	17	10	Derrike Cope	Whitcomb Racing	Chevrolet	366	0	running	160	$24,330
5	23	94	Terry Labonte	Hagan Racing	Oldsmobile	366	0	running	155	$19,515
6	15	22	Sterling Marlin	Junior Johnson & Associates	Ford	365	0	running	150	$12,875
7	4	11	Geoff Bodine	Junior Johnson & Associates	Ford	365	0	running	146	$18,230
8	3	3	Dale Earnhardt	Richard Childress Racing	Chevrolet	365	22	running	147	$20,470
9	32	75	Joe Ruttman	RahMoc Enterprises	Chevrolet	365	0	running	138	$11,990
10	21	68	Bobby Hamilton (R)	TriStar Motorsports	Oldsmobile	364	5	running	139	$14,250
11	24	1	Rick Mast	Precision Products Racing	Oldsmobile	364	8	running	135	$11,015
12	1	28	Davey Allison	Robert Yates Racing	Ford	363	151	running	132	$21,120
13	22	8	Rick Wilson	Stavola Brothers Racing	Buick	363	0	running	124	$10,930
14	27	26	Brett Bodine	King Racing	Buick	363	0	running	121	$9,940
15	18	5	Ricky Rudd	Hendrick Motorsports	Chevrolet	363	0	running	118	$14,100
16	30	43	Richard Petty	Petty Enterprises	Pontiac	363	0	running	115	$9,380
17	26	12	Hut Stricklin	Bobby Allison Motorsports	Buick	363	0	running	112	$9,110
18	2	9	Bill Elliott	Melling Racing	Ford	362	0	running	109	$13,935
19	11	15	Morgan Shepherd	Bud Moore Engineering	Ford	361	0	running	106	$12,755
20	31	55	Ted Musgrave (R)	U.S. Racing	Pontiac	360	1	running	108	$7,785
21	33	47	Greg Sacks	Close Racing	Oldsmobile	358	0	running	100	$5,260
22	16	42	Kyle Petty	SABCO Racing	Pontiac	357	0	engine	97	$12,140
23	14	24	Dick Trickle	Team III Racing	Pontiac	354	0	running	94	$5,770
24	12	17	Darrell Waltrip	Darrell Waltrip Motorsports	Chevrolet	351	1	running	96	$5,605
25	8	21	Dale Jarrett	Wood Brothers Racing	Ford	350	1	running	93	$7,545
26	35	87	Randy Baker	Buck Baker Racing	Chevrolet	343	0	running	85	$4,585
27	29	30	Michael Waltrip	Bahari Racing	Pontiac	333	0	running	82	$7,150
28	34	52	Jimmy Means	Jimmy Means Racing	Pontiac	309	0	engine	79	$4,365
29	10	6	Mark Martin	Roush Racing	Ford	303	12	engine	81	$14,255
30	19	41	Larry Pearson	Larry Hedrick Motorsports	Chevrolet	244	0	engine	73	$4,195
31	20	98	Jimmy Spencer	Travis Carter Enterprises	Chevrolet	220	0	valve	70	$6,660
32	13	2	Rusty Wallace	Penske Racing South	Pontiac	214	0	engine	67	$5,045
33	36	71	Dave Marcis	Marcis Auto Racing	Chevrolet	173	0	engine	64	$6,455
34	25	66	Lake Speed	Cale Yarborough Motorsports	Pontiac	156	0	engine	61	$5,820
35	7	7	Alan Kulwicki	AK Racing	Ford	148	0	engine	58	$10,710
36	28	19	Chad Little	Little Racing	Ford	123	0	engine	55	$3,650
37	37	82	Mark Stahl	Stahl Racing	Ford	14	0	flagged	52	$3,580
38	38	48	James Hylton	Hylton Motorsports	Buick	12	0	flagged	49	$3,540
Official race results

== Standings after the race ==
Drivers' Championship standings

	Pos	Driver	Points
	1	Dale Earnhardt	3,142
	2	Ricky Rudd	3,053 (-89)
2	3	Ernie Irvan	2,979 (-163)
	4	Davey Allison	2,940 (–202)
2	5	Mark Martin	2,901 (–241)
	6	Ken Schrader	2,826 (–316)
1	7	Sterling Marlin	2,735 (–407)
1	8	Darrell Waltrip	2,719 (–423)
1	9	Harry Gant	2,656 (–486)
1	10	Rusty Wallace	2,590 (–552)
Official driver's standings

- Note: Only the first 10 positions are included for the driver standings.

Previous race: 1991 Bud 500	NASCAR Winston Cup Series; 1991 season	Next race: 1991 Miller Genuine Draft 400 (Richmond)
