= 1996 NAPA 500 =

31st race of the 1996 NASCAR Winston Cup Series

Race details
- Race 31 of 31 in the 1996 NASCAR Winston Cup Series
- The 1996 NAPA 500 program cover, with artwork by Sam Bass.
- Date: November 10, 1996
- Official name: 37th Annual NAPA 500
- Location: Hampton, Georgia, Atlanta Motor Speedway
- Course: Permanent racing facility
- Course length: 1.54 miles (2.48 km)
- Distance: 328 laps, 499.216 mi (803.41 km)
- Average speed: 134.661 miles per hour (216.716 km/h)

Pole position
Driver	Bobby Labonte	Joe Gibbs Racing
- Time: 29.476

Most laps led
Driver	Bobby Labonte	Joe Gibbs Racing
- Laps: 147

Winner
No. 18	Bobby Labonte	Joe Gibbs Racing

Television in the United States
- Network: ESPN
- Announcers: Bob Jenkins, Ned Jarrett, Benny Parsons

Radio in the United States
- Radio: Motor Racing Network
- Booth announcers: Barney Hall, Allen Bestwick
- Turn announcers: Turns 1 and 2: Joe Moore; Turns 3 and 4: Kurt Becker

The 1996 NAPA 500 was the 31st and final stock car race of the 1996 NASCAR Winston Cup Series and the 37th iteration of the event. The race was held on Sunday, November 10, 1996, in Hampton, Georgia at Atlanta Motor Speedway, a 1.522 miles (2.449 km) permanent asphalt quad-oval intermediate speedway. The race took the scheduled 328 laps to complete. At race's end, Joe Gibbs Racing driver Bobby Labonte would manage to dominate for a majority of the race to take his fourth career NASCAR Winston Cup Series victory and his only victory of the season. To fill out the top three, Robert Yates Racing driver Dale Jarrett and Hendrick Motorsports driver Jeff Gordon would finish second and third, respectively.

In the process, Hendrick Motorsports driver Terry Labonte, needing an eighth-place finish or better to clinch the championship, would ride to a fifth-place finish, finishing ahead of runner-up Jeff Gordon, Labonte's teammate by 37 points. The championship was Labonte's second and final championship of his career.

== Background ==
The layout of Atlanta Motor Speedway, the circuit where the race was held.

Atlanta Motor Speedway (formerly Atlanta International Raceway) is a 1.522-mile race track in Hampton, Georgia, United States, 20 miles (32 km) south of Atlanta. It has annually hosted NASCAR Winston Cup Series stock car races since its inauguration in 1960.

The venue was bought by Speedway Motorsports in 1990. In 1994, 46 condominiums were built over the northeastern side of the track. In 1997, to standardize the track with Speedway Motorsports' other two intermediate ovals, the entire track was almost completely rebuilt. The frontstretch and backstretch were swapped, and the configuration of the track was changed from oval to quad-oval, with a new official length of 1.54-mile (2.48 km) where before it was 1.522-mile (2.449 km). The project made the track one of the fastest on the NASCAR circuit.

=== Entry list ===
- (R) - denotes rookie driver.

#	Driver	Team	Make
1	Rick Mast	Precision Products Racing	Pontiac
2	Rusty Wallace	Penske Racing South	Ford
02	Randy Baker	Miles Motorsports	Chevrolet
3	Dale Earnhardt	Richard Childress Racing	Chevrolet
4	Sterling Marlin	Morgan–McClure Motorsports	Chevrolet
5	Terry Labonte	Hendrick Motorsports	Chevrolet
6	Mark Martin	Roush Racing	Ford
7	Geoff Bodine	Geoff Bodine Racing	Ford
8	Hut Stricklin	Stavola Brothers Racing	Ford
9	Lake Speed	Melling Racing	Ford
10	Ricky Rudd	Rudd Performance Motorsports	Ford
11	Brett Bodine	Brett Bodine Racing	Ford
12	Derrike Cope	Bobby Allison Motorsports	Ford
15	Wally Dallenbach Jr.	Bud Moore Engineering	Ford
16	Ted Musgrave	Roush Racing	Ford
17	Darrell Waltrip	Darrell Waltrip Motorsports	Chevrolet
18	Bobby Labonte	Joe Gibbs Racing	Chevrolet
19	Loy Allen Jr.	TriStar Motorsports	Ford
20	Elton Sawyer	Ranier-Walsh Racing	Ford
21	Michael Waltrip	Wood Brothers Racing	Ford
22	Ward Burton	Bill Davis Racing	Pontiac
23	Jimmy Spencer	Haas-Carter Motorsports	Ford
24	Jeff Gordon	Hendrick Motorsports	Chevrolet
25	Ken Schrader	Hendrick Motorsports	Chevrolet
27	Ron Barfield Jr.	David Blair Motorsports	Ford
28	Ernie Irvan	Robert Yates Racing	Ford
29	Robert Pressley	Diamond Ridge Motorsports	Chevrolet
30	Johnny Benson Jr. (R)	Bahari Racing	Pontiac
33	Todd Bodine	Andy Petree Racing	Chevrolet
37	Jeremy Mayfield	Kranefuss-Haas Racing	Ford
40	Greg Sacks	Team SABCO	Chevrolet
41	Ricky Craven	Larry Hedrick Motorsports	Chevrolet
42	Kyle Petty	Team SABCO	Pontiac
43	Bobby Hamilton	Petty Enterprises	Pontiac
52	Jack Sprague	Ken Schrader Racing	Pontiac
71	Dave Marcis	Marcis Auto Racing	Chevrolet
75	Morgan Shepherd	Butch Mock Motorsports	Ford
77	Bobby Hillin Jr.	Jasper Motorsports	Ford
78	Billy Standridge	Triad Motorsports	Ford
81	Kenny Wallace	FILMAR Racing	Ford
87	Joe Nemechek	NEMCO Motorsports	Chevrolet
88	Dale Jarrett	Robert Yates Racing	Ford
90	Dick Trickle	Donlavey Racing	Ford
94	Bill Elliott	Bill Elliott Racing	Ford
95	Gary Bradberry	Sadler Brothers Racing	Ford
97	Chad Little	Mark Rypien Motorsports	Pontiac
98	Jeremy Mayfield	Cale Yarborough Motorsports	Ford
99	Jeff Burton	Roush Racing	Ford

== Qualifying ==
Qualifying was split into two rounds. The first round was held on Friday, November 8, at 2:30 PM EST. Each driver would have one lap to set a time. During the first round, the top 25 drivers in the round would be guaranteed a starting spot in the race. If a driver was not able to guarantee a spot in the first round, they had the option to scrub their time from the first round and try and run a faster lap time in a second round qualifying run, held on Saturday, November 9, at 11:00 AM EST. As with the first round, each driver would have one lap to set a time. For this specific race, positions 26-38 would be decided on time, and depending on who needed it, a select amount of positions were given to cars who had not otherwise qualified but were high enough in owner's points.

Bobby Labonte, driving for Joe Gibbs Racing, would win the pole, setting a time of 29.476 and an average speed of 185.887 miles per hour (299.156 km/h).

Six drivers would fail to qualify: Derrike Cope, Jeremy Mayfield, Dick Trickle, Kenny Wallace, Ron Barfield Jr., and Kyle Petty.

=== Full qualifying results ===
Pos.	#	Driver	Team	Make	Time	Speed
1	18	Bobby Labonte	Joe Gibbs Racing	Chevrolet	29.476	185.887
2	24	Jeff Gordon	Hendrick Motorsports	Chevrolet	29.571	185.290
3	5	Terry Labonte	Hendrick Motorsports	Chevrolet	29.688	184.559
4	6	Mark Martin	Roush Racing	Ford	29.693	184.528
5	88	Dale Jarrett	Robert Yates Racing	Ford	29.757	184.131
6	28	Ernie Irvan	Robert Yates Racing	Ford	29.775	184.020
7	33	Todd Bodine	Andy Petree Racing	Chevrolet	29.800	183.866
8	40	Greg Sacks	Team SABCO	Pontiac	29.817	183.761
9	43	Bobby Hamilton	Petty Enterprises	Pontiac	29.874	183.410
10	97	Chad Little	Mark Rypien Motorsports	Pontiac	29.880	183.373
11	8	Hut Stricklin	Stavola Brothers Racing	Ford	29.886	183.337
12	52	Jack Sprague	Ken Schrader Racing	Pontiac	29.891	183.306
13	94	Bill Elliott	Bill Elliott Racing	Ford	29.906	183.214
14	95	Gary Bradberry	Sadler Brothers Racing	Ford	29.910	183.190
15	1	Rick Mast	Precision Products Racing	Pontiac	29.911	183.183
16	30	Johnny Benson Jr. (R)	Bahari Racing	Pontiac	29.914	183.165
17	3	Dale Earnhardt	Richard Childress Racing	Chevrolet	29.928	183.079
18	29	Robert Pressley	Diamond Ridge Motorsports	Chevrolet	29.928	183.079
19	11	Brett Bodine	Brett Bodine Racing	Ford	29.930	183.067
20	9	Lake Speed	Melling Racing	Ford	29.936	183.030
21	87	Joe Nemechek	NEMCO Motorsports	Chevrolet	29.941	183.000
22	78	Billy Standridge	Triad Motorsports	Ford	29.948	182.957
23	22	Ward Burton	Bill Davis Racing	Pontiac	29.970	182.823
24	20	Elton Sawyer	Ranier-Walsh Racing	Ford	29.971	182.817
25	77	Bobby Hillin Jr.	Jasper Motorsports	Ford	29.973	182.805
26	41	Ricky Craven	Larry Hedrick Motorsports	Chevrolet	29.798	183.878
27	02	Randy Baker	Miles Motorsports	Chevrolet	29.914	183.165
28	10	Ricky Rudd	Rudd Performance Motorsports	Ford	29.983	182.744
29	19	Loy Allen Jr.	TriStar Motorsports	Ford	30.017	182.537
30	2	Rusty Wallace	Penske Racing South	Ford	30.031	182.451
31	98	John Andretti	Cale Yarborough Motorsports	Ford	30.033	182.439
32	15	Wally Dallenbach Jr.	Bud Moore Engineering	Ford	30.037	182.415
33	21	Michael Waltrip	Wood Brothers Racing	Ford	30.045	182.366
34	4	Sterling Marlin	Morgan–McClure Motorsports	Chevrolet	30.058	182.288
35	16	Ted Musgrave	Roush Racing	Ford	30.064	182.251
36	71	Dave Marcis	Marcis Auto Racing	Chevrolet	30.066	182.239
37	17	Darrell Waltrip	Darrell Waltrip Motorsports	Chevrolet	30.088	182.106
38	7	Geoff Bodine	Geoff Bodine Racing	Ford	30.092	182.082
Provisionals
39	25	Ken Schrader	Hendrick Motorsports	Chevrolet	-*	-*
40	99	Jeff Burton	Roush Racing	Ford	-*	-*
41	23	Jimmy Spencer	Travis Carter Enterprises	Ford	-*	-*
42	75	Morgan Shepherd	Butch Mock Motorsports	Ford	-*	-*
Failed to qualify
43	12	Derrike Cope	Bobby Allison Motorsports	Ford	-*	-*
44	37	Jeremy Mayfield	Kranefuss-Haas Racing	Ford	-*	-*
45	90	Dick Trickle	Donlavey Racing	Ford	-*	-*
46	81	Kenny Wallace	FILMAR Racing	Ford	-*	-*
47	27	Ron Barfield Jr.	David Blair Motorsports	Ford	-*	-*
48	42	Kyle Petty	Team SABCO	Pontiac	-*	-*
Official first round qualifying results
Official starting lineup

== Race results ==
Fin	St	#	Driver	Team	Make	Laps	Led	Status	Pts	Winnings
1	1	18	Bobby Labonte	Joe Gibbs Racing	Chevrolet	328	147	running	185	$274,900
2	5	88	Dale Jarrett	Robert Yates Racing	Ford	328	0	running	170	$59,500
3	2	24	Jeff Gordon	Hendrick Motorsports	Chevrolet	328	59	running	170	$71,600
4	17	3	Dale Earnhardt	Richard Childress Racing	Chevrolet	328	4	running	165	$47,400
5	3	5	Terry Labonte	Hendrick Motorsports	Chevrolet	328	28	running	160	$48,800
6	9	43	Bobby Hamilton	Petty Enterprises	Pontiac	328	13	running	155	$40,000
7	4	6	Mark Martin	Roush Racing	Ford	328	14	running	151	$37,880
8	28	10	Ricky Rudd	Rudd Performance Motorsports	Ford	328	0	running	142	$34,100
9	40	99	Jeff Burton	Roush Racing	Ford	328	1	running	143	$26,075
10	30	2	Rusty Wallace	Penske Racing South	Ford	328	0	running	134	$34,000
11	33	21	Michael Waltrip	Wood Brothers Racing	Ford	328	0	running	130	$29,125
12	23	22	Ward Burton	Bill Davis Racing	Pontiac	328	7	running	132	$33,000
13	15	1	Rick Mast	Precision Products Racing	Pontiac	328	0	running	124	$30,375
14	41	23	Jimmy Spencer	Travis Carter Enterprises	Ford	328	0	running	121	$27,950
15	34	4	Sterling Marlin	Morgan–McClure Motorsports	Chevrolet	328	0	running	118	$34,025
16	25	77	Bobby Hillin Jr.	Jasper Motorsports	Ford	328	0	running	115	$20,150
17	11	8	Hut Stricklin	Stavola Brothers Racing	Ford	328	0	running	112	$19,730
18	8	40	Greg Sacks	Team SABCO	Pontiac	327	0	running	109	$15,315
19	20	9	Lake Speed	Melling Racing	Ford	327	1	running	111	$26,175
20	13	94	Bill Elliott	Bill Elliott Racing	Ford	327	0	running	103	$27,360
21	19	11	Brett Bodine	Brett Bodine Racing	Ford	327	2	running	105	$25,445
22	10	97	Chad Little	Mark Rypien Motorsports	Pontiac	327	0	running	97	$14,230
23	24	20	Elton Sawyer	Ranier-Walsh Racing	Ford	327	0	running	94	$14,015
24	31	98	John Andretti	Cale Yarborough Motorsports	Ford	326	0	running	91	$17,400
25	36	71	Dave Marcis	Marcis Auto Racing	Chevrolet	325	0	running	88	$17,285
26	38	7	Geoff Bodine	Geoff Bodine Racing	Ford	325	0	running	85	$28,470
27	16	30	Johnny Benson Jr. (R)	Bahari Racing	Pontiac	325	0	running	82	$24,755
28	42	75	Morgan Shepherd	Butch Mock Motorsports	Ford	322	0	running	79	$16,540
29	22	78	Billy Standridge	Triad Motorsports	Ford	321	0	running	76	$13,180
30	39	25	Ken Schrader	Hendrick Motorsports	Chevrolet	319	0	running	73	$23,305
31	35	16	Ted Musgrave	Roush Racing	Ford	316	0	running	70	$23,140
32	7	33	Todd Bodine	Andy Petree Racing	Chevrolet	312	0	running	67	$22,975
33	18	29	Robert Pressley	Diamond Ridge Motorsports	Chevrolet	303	0	running	64	$22,910
34	21	87	Joe Nemechek	NEMCO Motorsports	Chevrolet	281	0	running	61	$22,345
35	26	41	Ricky Craven	Larry Hedrick Motorsports	Chevrolet	259	2	engine	63	$21,980
36	6	28	Ernie Irvan	Robert Yates Racing	Ford	255	50	crash	60	$44,215
37	37	17	Darrell Waltrip	Darrell Waltrip Motorsports	Chevrolet	196	0	handling	52	$19,685
38	14	95	Gary Bradberry	Sadler Brothers Racing	Ford	194	0	oil leak	49	$12,550
39	29	19	Loy Allen Jr.	TriStar Motorsports	Ford	192	0	crash	46	$12,550
40	32	15	Wally Dallenbach Jr.	Bud Moore Engineering	Ford	190	0	crash	43	$19,550
41	27	02	Randy Baker	Miles Motorsports	Chevrolet	51	0	crash	40	$12,550
42	12	52	Jack Sprague	Ken Schrader Racing	Pontiac	23	0	crash	37	$12,550
Official race results

Previous race: 1996 Dura Lube 500	NASCAR Winston Cup Series; 1996 season	Next race: 1997 Daytona 500
