= Gary Laton =

American racing driver (born 1962)

- Born: August 20, 1962 (age 64); Albemarle, North Carolina, U.S.

NASCAR O'Reilly Auto Parts Series career
- 2 races run over 2 years
- Best finish: 92nd (1997)
- First race: 1997 All Pro Bumper To Bumper 300 (Charlotte)
- Last race: 1998 GM Goodwrench Service Plus 200 (Rockingham)
Wins	Top tens	Poles
0	0	0

ARCA Menards Series career
- 12 races run over 2 years
- Best finish: 21st-101st (points not recorded past 21st) (1997) (1998)
- First race: 1997 EasyCare Certified 100 (Charlotte)
- Last race: 1998 ARCA Pepsi 400k (Pocono)
- First win: 1997 EasyCare Certified 200 (Charlotte)
Wins	Top tens	Poles
2	5	3
- Statistics up to date as of January 10, 2025.

Gary Laton (born August 20, 1962) is an American former professional stock car racing driver who has competed in the NASCAR Busch Series and the ARCA Bondo/Mar-Hyde Series.

Laton has also previously competed in the X-1R Pro Cup Series and the NASCAR Sportsman Division.

== Motorsports results ==
=== NASCAR ===
(key) (Bold - Pole position awarded by qualifying time. Italics - Pole position earned by points standings or practice time. * – Most laps led.)

==== Busch Series ====
NASCAR Busch Series results
Year	Team	No.	Make	1	2	3	4	5	6	7	8	9	10	11	12	13	14	15	16	17	18	19	20	21	22	23	24	25	26	27	28	29	30	31	NBSC	Pts	Ref
1997	Thomas Laton	93	Chevy	DAY	CAR	RCH	ATL	LVS	DAR	HCY	TEX	BRI	NSV	TAL	NHA	NZH	CLT	DOV	SBO	GLN	MLW	MYB	GTY	IRP	MCH	BRI	DAR	RCH	DOV	CLT; 23	CAL	CAR; DNQ	HOM		92nd	94	
1998	Thomas Laton	46	Chevy	DAY	CAR; 43	LVS	NSV	DAR	BRI	TEX	HCY	TAL	NHA	NZH	CLT; DNQ	DOV	RCH	PPR	GLN	MLW	MYB	CAL	SBO	IRP	MCH; DNQ	BRI	DAR	RCH	DOV	CLT	GTY	CAR	ATL	HOM	121st	34	

==== Goody's Dash Series ====
NASCAR Goody's Dash Series results
Year	Team	No.	Make	1	2	3	4	5	6	7	8	9	10	11	12	13	14	15	16	17	18	19	20	21	NGDS	Pts	Ref
1997	N/A	80	Chevy	DAY	HOM	KIN	MYB	LAN	CAR	TRI	FLO	HCY	BRI	GRE	SNM	CLT; DNQ	MYB	LAN	SUM	STA	HCY	USA	CON; DNQ	HOM	77th	110	

=== ARCA Bondo/Mar-Hyde Series ===
(key) (Bold – Pole position awarded by qualifying time. Italics – Pole position earned by points standings or practice time. * – Most laps led. ** – All laps led.)

ARCA Bondo/Mar-Hyde Series results
Year	Team	No.	Make	1	2	3	4	5	6	7	8	9	10	11	12	13	14	15	16	17	18	19	20	21	22	ABMHSC	Pts	Ref
1997	Thomas Laton	74	Chevy	DAY	ATL	SLM	**CLT**; 3*	CLT; 1*	POC	MCH	SBS	TOL	KIL	FRS	MIN	POC	**MCH**; 33	DSF	GTW	SLM	WIN	CLT; 35	TAL	ISF	ATL; 13	N/A	0	
1998	Thomas Laton	74	Chevy	DAY; 19	ATL; 6	SLM	**CLT**; 10	MEM	MCH; 10	POC; 12	SBS	TOL	PPR; 20	POC; 28	KIL	FRS	ISF	ATL	DSF	SLM	TEX	WIN	CLT	TAL	ATL	N/A	0	
