= Matt Hutter =

American stock car racing driver

- Born: May 19, 1971 (age 55); Chardon, Ohio, U.S.

NASCAR O'Reilly Auto Parts Series career
- 22 races run over 3 years
- Best finish: 42nd (1998)
- First race: 1998 NAPA Auto Parts 300 (Daytona)
- Last race: 2000 Touchstone Energy 300 (Talladega)
Wins	Top tens	Poles
0	1	0

NASCAR FedEx Freight Truck Series career
- 2 races run over 1 year
- Best finish: 67th (1998)
- First race: 1998 The No Fear Challenge (Fontana)
- Last race: 1998 Ram Tough 200 (Gateway)
Wins	Top tens	Poles
0	0	0

Matthew Hutter (born May 19, 1971) is a retired American stock car racing driver. He has raced in the NASCAR Busch Series and NASCAR Craftsman Truck Series. He is the son of the late Ron Hutter, a well known engine builder who built engines for a number of successful teams and drivers, including Dale Earnhardt Jr..

Hutter won the pole for the 1996 NASCAR Slim Jim All Pro Series Slim Jim 200 at Nashville Speedway USA, his first ever race at the famed short track. He made his NASCAR national touring series debut in 1998, driving the No. 36 Stanley Tools Pontiac Grand Prix for Team 34 in 15 races. His best finish was a ninth at Talladega Superspeedway, but he was released following the Lycos.com 250. He made one start later that year at IRP, filling for Jeff Purvis in the No. 4 car; he finished 36th. He also ran two Truck races that year, driving the Axicom Ford at Fontana, and the No. 11 for Phil Bonifield at Gateway, finishing 22nd and 23rd, respectively.

In 1999, Hutter ran five races in the No. 99 Red Man Chevrolet for Bill Papke, his best finish being an 11th at Fontana. He drove two races in 2000 for Phoenix Racing, his best finish a 19th at Daytona. He ran a few races in the ARCA RE/MAX Series, but has since dropped off the racing scene.

== Motorsports career results ==
=== NASCAR ===
(key) (Bold - Pole position awarded by qualifying time. Italics - Pole position earned by points standings or practice time. * – Most laps led.)

==== Busch Series ====
NASCAR Busch Series results
Year	Team	No.	Make	1	2	3	4	5	6	7	8	9	10	11	12	13	14	15	16	17	18	19	20	21	22	23	24	25	26	27	28	29	30	31	32	NBSC	Pts	Ref
1998	Team 34	36	Pontiac	DAY; 21	CAR; 19	LVS; 29	NSV; 39	DAR; 25	BRI; 18	TEX; 38	HCY; 24	TAL; 9	NHA; 29	NZH; 31	CLT; DNQ	DOV; 30	RCH; 41	PPR; 37	GLN	MLW	MYB	CAL	SBO													42nd	1169	
1998	Phoenix Racing	4	Chevy																					IRP; 36	MCH	BRI	DAR	RCH	DOV							42nd	1169	
1998	Phoenix Racing	24	Chevy																											CLT; DNQ	GTY					42nd	1169	
1998	Bobby Jones Racing	55	Pontiac																													CAR; DNQ	ATL	HOM		42nd	1169	
1999	Brewco Motorsports	99	Chevy	DAY	CAR	LVS	ATL	DAR	TEX	NSV	BRI	TAL; 16	CAL; 11	NHA	RCH	NZH	CLT	DOV	SBO	GLN	MLW; 41	MYB; 26	PPR; 22	GTY	IRP	MCH; DNQ	BRI	DAR	RCH	DOV	CLT	CAR	MEM	PHO	HOM	65th	467	
2000	Phoenix Racing	51	Chevy	DAY; 19	CAR	LVS	ATL	DAR	BRI	TEX	NSV	TAL; 43	CAL	RCH	NHA	CLT	DOV	SBO	MYB	GLN	MLW	NZH	PPR	GTY	IRP	MCH	BRI	DAR	RCH	DOV	CLT	CAR	MEM	PHO	HOM	95th	106	

==== Craftsman Truck Series ====
NASCAR Craftsman Truck Series results
Year	Team	No.	Make	1	2	3	4	5	6	7	8	9	10	11	12	13	14	15	16	17	18	19	20	21	22	23	24	25	26	27	NCTC	Pts	Ref
1998	CSG Motorsports	57	Ford	WDW	HOM	PHO	POR	EVG	I70	GLN	TEX	BRI	MLW	NZH	CAL; 22	PPR	IRP	NHA	FLM	NSV	HPT	LVL	RCH	MEM							67th	191	
1998	Team Racing	11	Chevy																						GTY; 22	MAR	SON	MMR	PHO	LVS	67th	191	

=== ARCA Bondo/Mar-Hyde Series ===
ARCA Bondo/Mar-Hyde Series results
Year	Team	No.	Make	1	2	3	4	5	6	7	8	9	10	11	12	13	14	15	16	17	18	19	20	21	22	23	24	25	ABMHSC	Pts	Ref
1996	Phoenix Racing	1	Chevy	DAY	ATL	SLM	TAL	FIF	LVL	CLT	CLT	KIL	FRS	POC	MCH	FRS	TOL	POC	MCH	INF	SBS	ISF	DSF	KIL	SLM	WIN	CLT; 25	ATL; 5	NA	-	
1997	Phoenix Racing	1	Chevy	DAY	ATL; 10	SLM	CLT; 5	**CLT**; 39	POC	MCH	SBS	TOL	KIL	FRS	MIN	POC	MCH; 13	DSF	GTW	SLM	WIN	CLT; 9	TAL; 18	ISF	ATL; DNQ				NA	-	
1998	Phoenix Racing	1	Chevy	DAY	ATL	SLM	CLT	MEM	MCH	POC	SBS	TOL	PPR	POC	KIL	FRS	ISF	ATL	DSF	SLM	TEX	WIN	CLT	TAL; 2	ATL				NA	-	
1999	Team Rensi Motorsports	83	Chevy	**DAY**; 27	ATL; 12	SLM	AND	CLT; 13	MCH; 4	POC; 2	TOL	SBS	BLN	POC	KIL	FRS	FLM	ISF	WIN	DSF	SLM	CLT; 31	TAL; 35	ATL					31st	1015	
2000	Phoenix Racing	1	Chevy	DAY; DNQ	SLM	AND				MCH; 39	POC; 9	TOL	KEN; 31	BLN	POC; DNQ	WIN	ISF	KEN; DNQ	DSF	SLM	CLT; 37	TAL; 4	ATL; 39						41st	750	
2000	Phoenix Racing	1	Pontiac				CLT; 33	KIL	FRS																				41st	750	
