= Kat Teasdale =

Canadian auto racing driver and businesswoman (1964–2016)

- Nationality: Canadian
- Born: Kathryn Pennington Teasdale; December 25, 1964
- Died: June 2, 2016 (aged 51)
- Relatives: Al Balding (uncle)

Previous series
- 1997 1993 1992: NASCAR Busch North Series; CASCAR; Indy Lights

Championship titles
- 1996–1998: Chevrolet Camaro Racing Series

Awards
- 1993: CASCAR Rookie of the Year

NASCAR O'Reilly Auto Parts Series career
- 1 race run over 1 year
- Best finish: 109th (1998)
- First race: 1998 DieHard 250 (Milwaukee)
Wins	Top tens	Poles
0	0	0

Kathryn Pennington Teasdale (December 25, 1964 – June 2, 2016) was a Canadian auto racing driver and businesswoman. She began racing Formula Fords in Canada in 1988, and later switched to stock car racing. She was the CASCAR rookie of the year in 1993, and a three-time Canadian national champion in the Chevrolet Camaro racing series from 1996 to 1998. She achieved several firsts for female drivers which included being the first Canadian woman to have an international racing license, the first woman to compete in the Indy Lights road racing series, and the first female driver in the NASCAR Busch Grand National Series. She succeeded in earning her own sponsorships in motorsport, and was later her own racing team owner. She was described by Andy Pilgrim as both a fearless driver and a talented athlete. Winning more than 180 races, she retired from professional racing in 1998.

== Early life ==
Teasdale was born December 25, 1964, and called Toronto, Ontario her hometown. She began riding horses at age 4, and later won a junior golfing championship. Her father Worden Teasdale was once president of the Royal Canadian Golf Association, and her uncle Al Balding played on the PGA Tour. As a teenager she was an alpine skiing racer, until quitting due to a knee injury in 1980. As a high school student, she attended The Woodlands School in Mississauga, Ontario.

== Auto racing career ==
Teasdale began her auto racing career in 1988. Her first competitions that season were Formula Ford races in Canada, with the ultimate goal of racing in the Canadian Formula Ford 2000 Championship. She later competed in the Player's GM Motorsports Series, the Trans-Am Series, and the International Race of Champions. During her time in the Player's series, she was recruited by the Baker Racing Chevrolet Corvette team. She joined the Landford Racing team in 1991, and participated in the Molson Indy Vancouver in the Atlantic Championship, becoming the first woman to compete in the series. In 1992, she participated in the Indy Lights series. After five years of racing, she owned her own team which competed in Canadian Automobile Sport Clubs races and the IMSA GT Championship, and had earned 150 race victories.

Teasdale made her debut in the CASCAR series during the 1993 season. She had limited previous exposure to stock cars at the time, but achieved success immediately by winning CASCAR's Hard Charger Award as its rookie of the year. In January 1994, she raced in the 24 Hours of Daytona with a Porsche team and with an all-women team. Later in the season she raced in the 12 Hours of Sebring, and was recruited to drive with the Pontiac Factory team. She remained with the Pontiac team until the 1996 season, and competed in the Street Stock Endurance Championship of the International Motor Sports Association, winning a team championship in 1995. From the 1996 to the 1998 season, she was the three-time Canadian national champion in the Chevrolet Camaro racing series.

In the 1997 and 1998 seasons, Teasdale drove Chevrolet No. 54 with Team IGA during the NASCAR Busch Grand National Series at the Lysol 200, held at the Watkins Glen International track. The 1997 race marked the first time a woman had competed in the NASCAR Busch Grand National Series. She later raced in other NASCAR events at Milwaukee Mile, Indianapolis Raceway Park, Michigan Speedway and Dover Downs International Speedway.

Teasdale had planned to race a full schedule during the 1999 season, but chose to retire from professional racing in 1998. She won over 180 races during her career, was the first Canadian woman to have an international racing license, and the first woman to race in the Indy Lights road racing series. She obtained dual Canadian and American citizenship during her racing career, and lived in both Toronto, Ontario and Charlotte, North Carolina.

=== Anecdotes ===
Fellow driver Andy Pilgrim stated that, "I knew Kat as a talented and fearless driver. She had great enthusiasm for racing, an upbeat and positive personality and loved to laugh. She was also a very talented athlete. The word 'driven', no pun intended, probably applied more to Kat than anyone else I ever met".

Peter McMurtrie credited Teasdale as someone who "raised the bar to new heights with her promotional skills and abilities as it relates to Canadian female athletes". He further stated that "Kathryn believed in herself, her talents and had faith in those surrounding her, and she wasn't shy about announcing it to the world". Teasdale was reported to be "a fan and friend of Corner 2 at Mosport International Raceway" in her native Canada.

Brian Stewart was the team owner on the 1992 Indy Lights series, and said that Teasdale insisted on as much practice as she could. He recalled that during a practice session in Michigan the input shaft on her transmission broke, and Teasdale arranged to meet another team at 5:30 in the morning on the Indiana Toll Road to get a replacement part and practice some more.

Candace Calder said that during an American autocross event which might have been Teasdale's first motorsport competition, Teasdale told the starter to wait a moment because she was applying lipstick.

== Businesswoman ==
TG Magazine interview...

"It seems it takes 20 years for a woman to come along in this sport. There is an old boys network and I honestly believe that the only way those things change is that you have to have your dream and then pursue it."

— Kat Teasdale, 1999

Teasdale started her own Black Kat racing team in early 1988 when she turned professional. It later changed into Kat & Company (Katko) Racing when she joined the NASCAR circuit. She was assisted by Canadian sports lawyer Gord Kirke as her legal counsel.

She initially struggled to find the money to compete as sponsorship deals were tentative in her early years, but she was determined as she felt that she was good enough and deserved to be on the same race track as men. In a 1999 interview she stated that there was a general lack of support for female drivers, which discouraged more from competing against their male counterparts. She was determined to work harder for corporate sponsorships, and credited those sponsors who assisted her with making her driving career possible.

During her career, Teasdale acted as a spokesperson or keynote speaker for several companies which included General Motors, IGA supermarkets, The Coca-Cola Company, Molson Brewery, Bridgestone, Firestone Tire and Rubber Company, and Methanex.

Teasdale also operated businesses in event management, and dog breeding. She received international recognition for her work with the Wirehaired Pointing Griffon breed.

== Community work ==
Teasdale became involved with charitable work at age 10 for Easter Seals Canada, Christian Children's Fund and the Ontario Society for the Prevention of Cruelty to Animals. As an adult, she was associated with the Canadian Lung Association, Canadian Cancer Society, Canadian Breast Cancer Foundation, Special Olympics Canada, and men's and women's community shelters.

== Later life ==
Teasdale was infected with Lyme disease later in life. Her obituary in the Toronto Star indicated that she died unexpectedly on June 2, 2016, after a long battle with physical and mental health issues. Donations were suggested to the Canadian Mental Health Association in her memory. A funeral was scheduled for June 10, 2016 at the Markland Wood Golf Club in Etobicoke, Toronto.

== Motorsports career results ==
=== NASCAR ===
(key) (Bold – Pole position awarded by qualifying time. Italics – Pole position earned by points standings or practice time. * – Most laps led.)

==== Busch Series ====
NASCAR Busch Series results
Year	Team	No.	Make	1	2	3	4	5	6	7	8	9	10	11	12	13	14	15	16	17	18	19	20	21	22	23	24	25	26	27	28	29	30	31	NBSC	Pts	Ref
1997	Team IGA	54	Chevy	DAY	CAR	RCH	ATL	LVS	DAR	HCY	TEX	BRI	NSV	TAL	NHA	NZH	CLT	DOV	SBO	GLN; DNQ	MLW	MYB	GTY	IRP	MCH	BRI	DAR	RCH	DOV	CLT	CAL	CAR	HOM		NA	-	
1998	Team IGA	54	Chevy	DAY	CAR	LVS	NSV	DAR	BRI	TEX	HCY	TAL	NHA	NZH	CLT	DOV	RCH	PPR	GLN; DNQ	MLW; 31	MYB	CAL	SBO	IRP	MCH	BRI	DAR	RCH	DOV	CLT	GTY	CAR	ATL	HOM	109th	70	

==== Busch North Series ====
NASCAR Busch North Series results
Year	Team	No.	Make	1	2	3	4	5	6	7	8	9	10	11	12	13	14	15	16	17	18	19	20	21	22	NBNSC	Pts	Ref
1997	Katko Racing	94	Chevy	DAY	LEE	JEN	NHA	NZH	HOL	NHA	STA	BEE	TMP	NZH	TIO	NHA	STA	TRO	GLN; 26	EPP	RPS	BEE	TMP	NHA	LIM; 29	73rd	162	

=== Indy Lights ===
(key)

Year	Team	1	2	3	4	5	6	7	8	9	10	11	12	Rank	Points	Ref
1992	Leading Edge Motorsport	PHX	LBH	DET	POR	MIL	LOU	TOR; 14	CLE	VAN; 14	MDO	NAZ	LS	**NA**	-	
