= Dale Fischlein =

American racing driver

- Born: January 2, 1960 (age 66); Davenport, Iowa, U.S.

NASCAR O'Reilly Auto Parts Series career
- 18 races run over 5 years
- Best finish: 61st (1996)
- First race: 1994 Fram Filter 500K (Talladega)
- Last race: 1998 DieHard 250 (Milwaukee)
Wins	Top tens	Poles
0	0	0

ARCA Menards Series career
- 5 races run over 2 years
- Best finish: 21st-101st (points not recorded past 21st) (1983) (1993)
- First race: 1983 Talladega ARCA 200 (Talladega)
- Last race: 1993 Jiffy Lube 500k (Atlanta)
Wins	Top tens	Poles
0	0	0
- Statistics up to date as of January 10, 2025.

Dale Fischlein (born January 2, 1960) is an American former professional stock car racing driver who has competed in the NASCAR Busch Series and the ARCA Hooters SuperCar Series.

Fischlein has also previously competed in the USAC Stock Car Series, the Northern Xtreme DirtCar Series, the NASCAR All-Star Series, and the IMCA Deery Brothers Summer Series.

== Motorsports results ==
=== NASCAR ===
(key) (Bold - Pole position awarded by qualifying time. Italics - Pole position earned by points standings or practice time. * – Most laps led.)

==== Winston Cup Series ====
NASCAR Winston Cup Series results
Year	Team	No.	Make	1	2	3	4	5	6	7	8	9	10	11	12	13	14	15	16	17	18	19	20	21	22	23	24	25	26	27	28	29	NWCC	Pts	Ref
1989	N/A	N/A	N/A	DAY	CAR	ATL	RCH	DAR	BRI	NWS	MAR	TAL	CLT	DOV	SON	POC	MCH	DAY	POC	TAL	GLN	MCH	BRI	DAR	RCH	DOV	MAR	CLT	NWS; DNQ	CAR	PHO	ATL	N/A	0	
1991	Barkdoll Racing	73	Olds	DAY	RCH	CAR	ATL	DAR	BRI	NWS	MAR	TAL	CLT	DOV	SON	POC	MCH	DAY	POC	TAL	GLN	MCH	BRI	DAR	RCH; DNQ	DOV	MAR	NWS	CLT	CAR	PHO	ATL	N/A	0	

==== Busch Series ====
NASCAR Busch Series results
Year	Team	No.	Make	1	2	3	4	5	6	7	8	9	10	11	12	13	14	15	16	17	18	19	20	21	22	23	24	25	26	27	28	29	30	31	NBSC	Pts	Ref
1994	Murphy Motorsports	70	Chevy	DAY; DNQ	CAR	RCH	ATL; DNQ	MAR	DAR	HCY	BRI	ROU	NHA	NZH	CLT; DNQ	DOV	MYB	GLN	MLW	SBO	TAL; 14			MCH; 30	BRI	DAR	RCH	DOV	CLT	MAR	CAR				65th	294	
1994	Murphy Motorsports	70	Buick																			HCY; 21	IRP												65th	294	
1995	Murphy Motorsports	70	Chevy	DAY; DNQ	CAR	RCH	ATL	NSV	DAR	BRI	HCY	NHA	NZH	CLT; DNQ	DOV	MYB	GLN	MLW	TAL; 13	SBO	IRP	MCH	BRI	DAR	RCH	DOV; 29	CLT	CAR	HOM; DNQ						72nd	200	
1996	Murphy Motorsports	70	Chevy	DAY; DNQ	CAR	RCH	ATL; 30	NSV	DAR	BRI	HCY	NZH	CLT; DNQ	DOV	SBO	MYB	GLN	MLW; 23	NHA	TAL; 24	IRP	MCH	BRI	DAR	RCH	DOV	CLT	CAR	HOM; DNQ						61st	258	
1997	Murphy Motorsports	70	Chevy	DAY; 32	CAR	RCH	ATL; 32	LVS	DAR	HCY	TEX	BRI	NSV	TAL; 25	NHA	NZH	CLT; 41	DOV	SBO	GLN	MLW	MYB	GTY; 36	IRP	MCH	BRI	DAR	RCH	DOV	CLT	CAL	CAR	HOM; DNQ		63rd	372	
1998	Murphy Motorsports	70	Chevy	DAY; 17	CAR	LVS; DNQ	NSV	DAR	BRI	TEX	HCY	TAL; 25	NHA	NZH	CLT; 27	DOV	RCH	PPR	GLN	MLW; 38	MYB	CAL	SBO	IRP	MCH; DNQ	BRI	DAR	RCH	DOV	CLT	GTY	CAR	ATL	HOM	62nd	331	

=== ARCA Hooters SuperCar Series ===
(key) (Bold – Pole position awarded by qualifying time. Italics – Pole position earned by points standings or practice time. * – Most laps led.)

ARCA Hooters SuperCar Series results
Year	Team	No.	Make	1	2	3	4	5	6	7	8	9	10	11	12	13	14	15	16	17	18	19	20	AHSS	Pts	Ref
1983	Keith Knaack	00	Dodge	DAY	NSV	TAL	LPR	LPR	ISF	IRP	SSP	FRS	BFS	WIN	LPR	POC	TAL; 17	MCS	FRS	MIL	DSF	ZAN	SND	N/A	0	
1993	Marcis Auto Racing	71	Chevy	DAY; 39	FIF	TWS	TAL; 13	KIL	CMS	FRS	TOL	POC	MCH; 31	FRS	POC	KIL	ISF	DSF	TOL	SLM	WIN	ATL; 19		N/A	0	
