= Mark Krogh =

American racing driver (born 1975)

- Born: February 4, 1975 (age 51); Kamiah, Idaho, U.S.

NASCAR O'Reilly Auto Parts Series career
- 46 races run over 3 years
- Best finish: 28th (1998)
- First race: 1997 Goodwrench Service 200 (Rockingham)
- Last race: 1999 Yellow Freight 300 (Atlanta)
Wins	Top tens	Poles
0	2	0

Mark Krogh (born February 4, 1975) is an American professional stock car racing driver. He has raced in the NASCAR Busch Series, making 46 starts with a best finish of eighth, coming at both New Hampshire Motor Speedway in 1997 and Auto Club Speedway in 1998. He is the younger brother of fellow driver Jeff Krogh.

== Motorsports career results ==
=== NASCAR ===
(key) (Bold – Pole position awarded by qualifying time. Italics – Pole position earned by points standings or practice time. * – Most laps led.)

==== Winston Cup Series ====
NASCAR Winston Cup Series results
Year	Team	No.	Make	1	2	3	4	5	6	7	8	9	10	11	12	13	14	15	16	17	18	19	20	21	22	23	24	25	26	27	28	29	30	31	NWCC	Pts	Ref
1996	Excel Motorsports	20	Chevy	DAY	CAR	RCH	ATL	DAR	BRI	NWS	MAR	TAL	SON; DNQ	CLT	DOV	POC	MCH	DAY	NHA	POC	TAL	IND	GLN	MCH	BRI	DAR	RCH	DOV	MAR	NWS	CLT	CAR	PHO; DNQ	ATL	NA	-	

==== Busch Series ====
NASCAR Busch Series results
Year	Team	No.	Make	1	2	3	4	5	6	7	8	9	10	11	12	13	14	15	16	17	18	19	20	21	22	23	24	25	26	27	28	29	30	31	32	NBSC	Pts	Ref
1997	Excel Motorsports	80	Chevy	DAY	CAR; 40	RCH; 19	ATL	LVS	DAR; 35	HCY; DNQ	TEX	BRI; 34	NSV; 37	TAL	NHA; 8	NZH	CLT; 26	DOV; 32	SBO; DNQ	GLN; 23	MLW; 29	MYB; 26	GTY; 30	IRP; 30	MCH; 24	BRI; 33	DAR; 24	RCH; DNQ	DOV; 33	CLT; DNQ	CAL; 39	CAR; 30	HOM; 42			31st	1481	
1998	Excel Motorsports	80	Chevy	DAY; 41	CAR; 36	LVS; 11	NSV; DNQ	DAR; 26	BRI; 32	TEX; 20	HCY; 30	TAL; 39	NHA; 28	NZH; 17	CLT; DNQ	DOV; 26	RCH; 36	PPR; 38	GLN; DNQ	MLW; 40	MYB; DNQ	CAL; 8	SBO; DNQ	IRP; 24	MCH; 26	BRI; 28	DAR; 33	RCH; DNQ	DOV; 21	CLT; 42	GTY; 22	CAR; 25	ATL; 17	HOM; DNQ		28th	1917	
1999	Excel Motorsports	80	Chevy	DAY; DNQ	CAR; 39	LVS; DNQ	ATL; 36	DAR; DNQ	TEX; DNQ	NSV	BRI	TAL	CAL	NHA	RCH	NZH	CLT	DOV	SBO	GLN	MLW	MYB	PPR	GTY	IRP	MCH	BRI	DAR	RCH	DOV	CLT	CAR	MEM	PHO	HOM	110th	101	

==== Winston West Series ====
NASCAR Winston West Series results
Year	Team	No.	Make	1	2	3	4	5	6	7	8	9	10	11	12	13	14	15	Pos.	Pts	Ref
1996	Excel Motorsports	24	Chevy	TUS; 18	AMP; 12	MMR; 10		**MAD**; 2*	POR; 7	TUS; 1	**EVG**; 6	CNS; 6	MAD; 12	MMR; 10	SON; 16	**MMR**; 10	PHO; DNQ	LVS	4th	1907	
1996	Excel Motorsports	20	Chevy				SON; DNQ												4th	1907	
