= Jeff Krogh =

American racing driver (born 1972)

- Born: March 21, 1972 (age 54); Kamiah, Idaho, U.S.

NASCAR Cup Series career
- 2 races run over 1 year
- Best finish: 59th (1996)
- First race: 1996 Save Mart Supermarkets 300 (Sonoma)
- Last race: 1996 Dura Lube 500 (Phoenix)
| Wins | Top tens | Poles |
|---|---|---|
| 0 | 0 | 0 |

NASCAR O'Reilly Auto Parts Series career
- 56 races run over 3 years
- Best finish: 25th (1998)
- First race: 1997 Hardee's Fried Chicken 250 (Richmond)
- Last race: 1999 DieHard 250 (Milwaukee)
| Wins | Top tens | Poles |
|---|---|---|
| 0 | 2 | 0 |
- Statistics up to date as of December 12, 2012.

Jeff Krogh (born March 21, 1972) is an American former professional race car driver, who competed in the NASCAR Busch Grand National Series and the NASCAR Winston West Series. He was seriously injured in a crash during the 1999 Busch Grand National season and never returned to competition.

== Personal life ==
Krogh was born in Kamiah, Idaho in 1972. Brother of fellow NASCAR driver Mark Krogh, he is married to Karla and has five children.

== Career ==
=== Winston West and Winston Cup Series ===
After starting his career at local tracks in the western United States, Krogh moved up to the NASCAR Winston West Series in 1996. Competing full-time in the series, he competed in fourteen of the fifteen events that season, finishing second in both the championship chase and the Rookie-of-the-Year competition to Lance Hooper.

Krogh was credited as scoring a single victory over the course of the season. This was in the first of two races the Winston West Series ran during the season at Sears Point Raceway in Sonoma, California; the event was a combination event with the NASCAR Winston Cup Series Save Mart Supermarkets 300. Krogh qualified 28th for the race; he finished 35th overall in the event, but first among Winston West competitors; a second combination race later that year at Phoenix International Raceway saw Krogh finishing 41st overall and second among Winston West Series drivers to eventual champion Hooper; these were the only Winston Cup events he would compete in.

=== Busch Series ===
Following the 1996 season, Krogh, along with his brother, moved to the NASCAR Busch Grand National Series, still competing for his family's race team. Over the next three years, he competed in 57 events, with a best finish of fifth at Texas Motor Speedway in 1998.

In July 1999, during final practice for an event at The Milwaukee Mile, Krogh's car was involved in an accident; he suffered severe head injuries, placing Krogh into a coma for a month. Moved to a specialist hospital in Colorado for treatment before returning home that December, Krogh spent over a year in recovery and rehabilitation. He was able to return to normal life, but has no memory of the accident, and never competed in racing competition again.

== Motorsports career results ==
=== NASCAR ===
(key) (Bold – Pole position awarded by qualifying time. Italics – Pole position earned by points standings or practice time. * – Most laps led.)

==== Winston Cup Series ====
NASCAR Winston Cup Series results
| Year | Team | No. | Make | 1 | 2 | 3 | 4 | 5 | 6 | 7 | 8 | 9 | 10 | 11 | 12 | 13 | 14 | 15 | 16 | 17 | 18 | 19 | 20 | 21 | 22 | 23 | 24 | 25 | 26 | 27 | 28 | 29 | 30 | 31 | NWCC | Pts | Ref |
|---|---|---|---|---|---|---|---|---|---|---|---|---|---|---|---|---|---|---|---|---|---|---|---|---|---|---|---|---|---|---|---|---|---|---|---|---|---|
| 1996 | Excel Motorsports | 14 | Chevy | DAY | CAR | RCH | ATL | DAR | BRI | NWS | MAR | TAL | SON; 35 | CLT | DOV | POC | MCH | DAY | NHA | POC | TAL | IND | GLN | MCH | BRI | DAR | RCH | DOV | MAR | NWS | CLT | CAR | | | 59th | 98 | |
| 1996 | Excel Motorsports | 01 | Chevy | | | | | | | | | | | | | | | | | | | | | | | | | | | | | | PHO; 41 | ATL | 59th | 98 | |

==== Busch Series ====
Busch Series Grand National Division results
| Year | Team | No. | Make | 1 | 2 | 3 | 4 | 5 | 6 | 7 | 8 | 9 | 10 | 11 | 12 | 13 | 14 | 15 | 16 | 17 | 18 | 19 | 20 | 21 | 22 | 23 | 24 | 25 | 26 | 27 | 28 | 29 | 30 | 31 | 32 | NBSC | Pts | Ref |
|---|---|---|---|---|---|---|---|---|---|---|---|---|---|---|---|---|---|---|---|---|---|---|---|---|---|---|---|---|---|---|---|---|---|---|---|---|---|---|
| 1997 | Excel Motorsports | 56 | Chevy | DAY | CAR; DNQ | RCH; 20 | ATL | LVS | DAR; 26 | HCY; DNQ | TEX | BRI; 26 | NSV; 27 | TAL | NHA; 23 | NZH | CLT; DNQ | DOV; 30 | SBO; DNQ | GLN; 22 | MLW; 20 | MYB; 31 | GTY; DNQ | IRP; 9 | MCH; 30 | BRI; 14 | DAR; 27 | RCH; DNQ | DOV; 40 | CLT; DNQ | CAL; 24 | CAR; DNQ | HOM; 29 | | | 35th | 1416 | |
| 1998 | Excel Motorsports | 56 | Chevy | DAY; 43 | CAR; 28 | LVS; 21 | NSV; DNQ | DAR; 35 | BRI; 36 | TEX; 5 | HCY; 17 | TAL; 20 | NHA; 23 | NZH; 22 | CLT; 42 | DOV; 23 | RCH; DNQ | PPR; 13 | GLN; 42 | MLW; 28 | MYB; 18 | CAL; 30 | SBO; DNQ | IRP; 11 | MCH; 40 | BRI; 35 | DAR; 31 | RCH; 22 | DOV; 30 | CLT; 24 | GTY; 26 | CAR; 34 | ATL; 32 | HOM; DNQ | | 25th | 2225 | |
| 1999 | Excel Motorsports | 56 | Chevy | DAY; DNQ | CAR; 32 | LVS; 41 | ATL; 22 | DAR; 26 | TEX; 36 | NSV; 21 | BRI; 40 | TAL; 39 | CAL; 23 | NHA; 31 | RCH; 24 | NZH; 35 | CLT; DNQ | DOV; 18 | SBO; DNQ | GLN; DNQ | MLW; 43 | MYB | PPR | GTY | IRP | MCH | BRI | DAR | RCH | DOV | CLT | CAR | MEM | PHO | HOM | 50th | 960 | |
