= Mark Green (racing driver) =

American racing driver (born 1959)

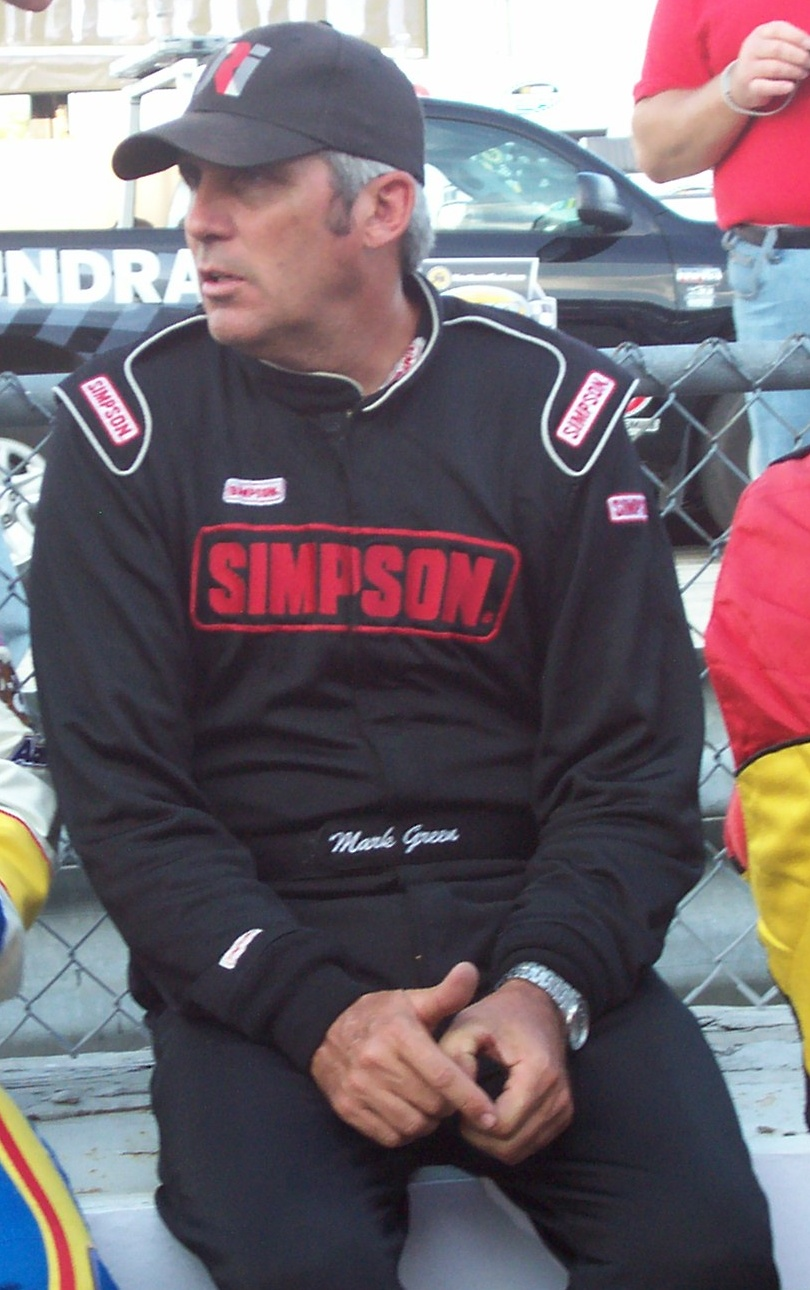
- Green at the Milwaukee Mile in 2009
- Born: Mark Steven Green; April 8, 1959 (age 67); Owensboro, Kentucky, U.S.

NASCAR O'Reilly Auto Parts Series career
- 318 races run over 17 years
- 2011 position: 53rd
- Best finish: 11th (1997)
- First race: 1995 Kroger 200 (IRP)
- Last race: 2011 WYPALL* 200 (Phoenix International Raceway)
Wins	Top tens	Poles
0	15	0

NASCAR FedEx Freight Truck Series career
- 2 races run over 1 year
- Best finish: 72nd (1997)
- First race: 1997 Sears DieHard 200 (Milwaukee)
- Last race: 1997 Cummins 200 (IRP)
Wins	Top tens	Poles
0	0	0

ARCA Menards Series career
- 2 races run over 2 years
- Best finish: 102nd (2021)
- First race: 2001 ARCA Re/Max 200 (Chicagoland)
- Last race: 2021 Dawn 150 (Mid-Ohio)
Wins	Top tens	Poles
0	0	0
- Statistics up to date as of June 4, 2021.

Mark Steven Green (born April 8, 1959) is an American professional stock car racing driver. He is the brother of drivers, Jeff Green and David Green.

== Early career ==
Green began his racing career in 1973, racing go-karts in the Southern Indiana Racing Association. During his tenure, he won six consecutive championships. He then moved on to the late model division at several local speedways. Among the tracks he competed on were Nashville Speedway USA, Beech Bend Raceway, and Kentucky Motor Speedway. From 1988 to 1991, he also competed in the All-American Challenge Series. In 1993, he won sixteen of twenty races at Beech Bend and won the track championships there, from 1991 to 1993.

== Motorsports career ==
=== 1995–2000 ===
Green made his Busch Series debut in 1995 at Indianapolis Raceway Park. He qualified the No. 41 Brewco Motorsports Chevrolet in the 28th spot and finished 18th. He signed to run ten more races in 1996, in the No. 37 Timber Wolf Chevy. He posted his first career top-ten at Myrtle Beach Speedway, where he finished tenth, in addition to qualifying on the outside pole. In 1997, Green and Brewco ran the full schedule, posting five top-tens including a career best fifth-place finish at Charlotte Motor Speedway. He finished eleventh in points. Green also ran two Craftsman Truck Series races that year for Brewco, finishing eleventh at IRP.

In 1998, Green continued to drive for Brewco but only had four top-ten finishes. After his thirteenth-place points finish, Green departed from the team. He joined Washington-Erving Motorsports, driving the No. 50 Dr Pepper Chevy. His best finish that season was tenth at the Yellow Freight 300 and he dropped to 21st in the standings. He exited the ride due to a lack of funding and drove the No. 63 Exxon Chevy for HVP Motorsports and had a seventh-place run at Talladega Superspeedway.

=== 2001–2005 ===
In 2001, Green was announced as the driver of the No. 55 Davis & Weight Motorsports Ford Taurus in the Busch Series. After two top-twenty finishes early in the season, Davis & Weight announced it was closing its Busch team to run the Winston Cup Series. When that deal failed to materialize, Green ran out the remainder of the schedule for various teams, his best finish a ninth at Kansas Speedway for ST Motorsports. He also made his first Cup attempt at the NAPA 500 in the No. 41 for A.J. Foyt Racing but failed to qualify.

Green began 2002 without a full-time ride. He began driving the No. 38 Deka Batteries Ford for Akins Motorsports, sharing the ride with Christian Elder. He had to miss some time after suffering a broken left foot in a hard crash on the last lap during the spring race at Bristol Motor Speedway with Larry Foyt. He had a second-place qualifying effort at Pikes Peak International Raceway, and ten top-twenty finishes before winding up 32nd in the points. In 2003, he lost his ride and drove five Busch races for various teams, his best finish a twentieth at the Stacker 200 for ORTEC Racing. He attempted the Cup race at Lowe's Motor Speedway for Foyt again but did not qualify.

Green drove various cars for Jay Robinson Racing in 2004. His best finish for Robinson was a 21st at Nazareth Speedway in the No. 49 Advil Ford. Late in the season, he departed JRR and signed with the fledgling Keith Coleman Racing team, piloting the No. 26 lovefifi.com Chevrolet. In five starts with KCR, his best finish came at Atlanta Motor Speedway, where he finished 23rd. He began 2005 in the No. 7 Boudreaux's Butt Paste Chevy for GIC-Mixon Motorsports, but returned to KCR to drive its No. 23 Vassarette Chevy, finishing eleventh at Talladega. He was released towards the end of the season.

=== 2006–2008 ===
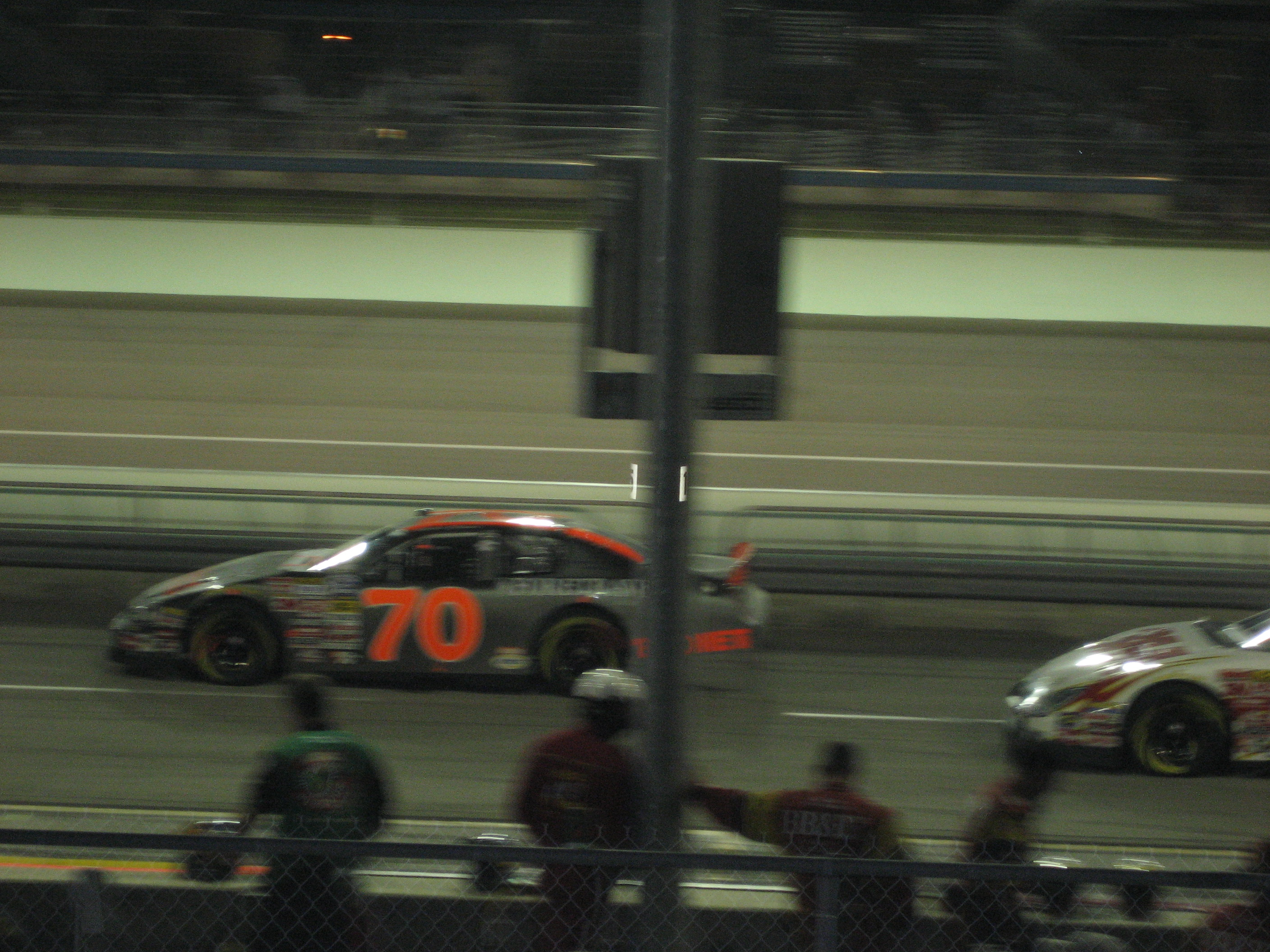
Mark Green (No. 70) leads Greg Biffle (No. 16) down pit road during a caution in the 2007 Ford 300 at the Homestead-Miami Speedway.

Green was announced as the driver of the No. 4 Geico Dodge Charger for Biagi Brothers Racing in 2006, and opened the year with a tenth-place finish at the Hershey's Kissables 300. Despite two additional fifteenth place runs, he was dismissed early in the season, and replaced by rookie Auggie Vidovich II. After beginning the 2007 season as a test driver for Michael Waltrip Racing, he replaced Justin Diercks in the No. 70 car owned by ML Motorsports, and finished the year with the team, his best finish being nineteenth at Gateway. Still with ML Motorsports in 2008, Green had a best finish of fifth at Talladega. Green would go on to post three more top fifteens and had a chance to win at Memphis Motorsports Park before an engine problem put him out of contention.

=== 2009–present ===
Green started 2009 with the team again. However, Green failed to qualify for the race at Bristol Motor Speedway and lost his ride shortly thereafter. He then joined JD Motorsports as the driver of the No. 0 car. After several races, Green swapped with Kertus Davis to join Jay Robinson Racing to drive the 49 car. The No. 49 car and Mark Green were sponsored by Getmorevacations.com for a portion of the 2009 season. When Getmorevacations.com dropped out of the sponsor position, Juggle.com began to give support. Green finished in 26th-place in the final race of 2009 at the Homestead-Miami Speedway. 2010 brought Green back with Jay Robinson splitting time between the No. 49, and No. 70 cars. In most of the races that Green was in the No. 49, he was a start and park. When he was in the No. 70 (which was a partnership between JRR and ML Motorsports), he ran the distance and had moderate success with several top-25 finishes and a couple of top-twenty finishes.

It was reported that Green had retired in 2011 but ended up driving the No. 49 car for Jay Robinson Racing during the latter half of the season. In 2012, Green returned for the NASCAR Sprint Cup Series race in the fall at Richmond International Raceway, driving the No. 0 Toyota for SS Motorsports, but failed to qualify for the event. Green currently serves as Director of Driver Development for Rev Racing, as well as serving as a test driver for the team.

In 2021, Green drove the No. 02 Chevrolet for Young's Motorsports in the ARCA Menards Series race at the Mid-Ohio Sports Car Course in place of regular driver Toni Breidinger, his first start in the series since 2001 as well as his first start in a NASCAR sanctioned event since 2011. His entry was also fielded in collaboration with Rev Racing. He would go on to finish in seventeenth after running five laps due to vibrations in the car.

== Motorsports career results ==
=== NASCAR ===
(key) (Bold – Pole position awarded by qualifying time. Italics – Pole position earned by points standings or practice time. * – Most laps led.)

==== Sprint Cup Series ====
NASCAR Sprint Cup Series results
Year	Team	No.	Make	1	2	3	4	5	6	7	8	9	10	11	12	13	14	15	16	17	18	19	20	21	22	23	24	25	26	27	28	29	30	31	32	33	34	35	36	NSCC	Pts	Ref
2001	A. J. Foyt Racing	41	Pontiac	DAY	CAR	LVS	ATL	DAR	BRI	TEX	MAR	TAL	CAL	RCH	CLT	DOV	MCH	POC	SON	DAY	CHI	NHA	POC	IND	GLN	MCH	BRI	DAR	RCH	DOV	KAN	CLT	MAR	TAL	PHO	CAR	HOM	ATL; DNQ	NHA	N/A	–	
2003	A. J. Foyt Racing	14	Dodge	DAY	CAR	LVS	ATL	DAR	BRI	TEX	TAL	MAR	CAL	RCH	CLT	DOV	POC	MCH	SON	DAY	CHI	NHA	POC	IND	GLN	MCH	BRI	DAR	RCH	NHA	DOV	TAL	KAN	CLT; DNQ	MAR; DNQ	ATL	PHO	CAR	HOM	N/A	–	
2005	Petty Enterprises	45	Dodge	DAY	CAL	LVS	ATL	BRI	MAR	TEX	PHO	TAL	DAR	RCH	CLT	DOV	POC	MCH	SON	DAY	CHI	NHA	POC	IND	GLN	MCH	BRI	CAL	RCH	NHA; QL^{†}	DOV	TAL	KAN	CLT	MAR	ATL	TEX	PHO	HOM	N/A	–	
2012	SS Motorsports	0	Toyota	DAY	PHO	LVS	BRI	CAL	MAR	TEX	KAN	RCH	TAL	DAR	CLT	DOV	POC	MCH	SON	KEN	DAY	NHA	IND	POC	GLN	MCH	BRI	ATL	RCH; DNQ	CHI	NHA	DOV	TAL	CLT	KAN	MAR	TEX	PHO	HOM	N/A	–	
^{†} – Qualified for Kyle Petty

==== Nationwide Series ====
NASCAR Nationwide Series results
Year	Team	No.	Make	1	2	3	4	5	6	7	8	9	10	11	12	13	14	15	16	17	18	19	20	21	22	23	24	25	26	27	28	29	30	31	32	33	34	35	NNSC	Pts	Ref
1995	Brewco Motorsports	41	Chevy	DAY	CAR	RCH	ATL	NSV	DAR	BRI	HCY	NHA	NZH	CLT	DOV	MYB	GLN	MLW	TAL	SBO	IRP; 18	MCH	BRI	DAR	RCH; 28	DOV	CLT	CAR; DNQ	HOM; DNQ										73rd	188	
1996	Brewco Motorsports	37	Chevy	DAY	CAR; 36	RCH; DNQ	ATL	NSV; 38	DAR	BRI	HCY; DNQ	NZH; 19	CLT	DOV	SBO; 28	MYB; 10	GLN	MLW; 19	NHA	TAL	IRP; 14	MCH	BRI	DAR	RCH; 13	DOV	CLT; DNQ	CAR; 21	HOM; 30										46th	947	
1997	Brewco Motorsports	37	Chevy	DAY; 8	CAR; 14	RCH; 12	ATL; 13	LVS; 25	DAR; 19	HCY; 9	TEX; 34	BRI; 40	NSV; 21	TAL; 24	NHA; 22	NZH; 14	CLT; 19	DOV; 24	SBO; 23	GLN; 15	MLW; 15	MYB; 15	GTY; 8	IRP; 26	MCH; 12	BRI; 13	DAR; 22	RCH; 19	DOV; 11	CLT; 5	CAL; 41	CAR; 8	HOM; 18						11th	3261	
1998	Brewco Motorsports	37	Chevy	DAY; 14	CAR; 9	LVS; 16	NSV; 34	DAR; 17	BRI; 17	TEX; 7	HCY; 22	TAL; 35	NHA; 20	NZH; 11	CLT; 15	DOV; 16	RCH; 21	PPR; 7	GLN; 33	MLW; 32	MYB; 9	CAL; 19	SBO; 21	IRP; 28	MCH; 38	BRI; 20	DAR; 28	RCH; 19	DOV; 23	CLT; 39	GTY; 21	CAR; 40	ATL; 12	HOM; 22					13th	3075	
1999	Washington-Erving Motorsports	50	Chevy	DAY; 24	CAR; 23	LVS; 32	ATL; 10	DAR; 33	TEX; 31	NSV; 30	BRI; 17	TAL; 37	CAL; 36	NHA; 27	RCH; 21	NZH; 22	CLT; 16	DOV; 29	SBO; 26	GLN; 37	MLW; 26	MYB; DNQ	PPR; 23	GTY; 32	IRP; 19	MCH; 41	BRI; 42	DAR; 33	RCH; 19	DOV; 22	CLT; 40	CAR; 28	MEM; 17	PHO; 31	HOM; DNQ				21st	2419	
2000	HMV Motorsports	63	Chevy	DAY; 18	CAR; 26	LVS; 27	ATL; 29	DAR; 40	BRI; 13	TEX; 25	NSV; 41	TAL; 7	CAL; 25	RCH; 24	NHA; 25	CLT; DNQ	DOV; 33	SBO; 30	MYB; 29	GLN; 18	MLW; 23	NZH; 42	PPR; 31	GTY; 30	IRP; 18	MCH; 28	BRI; 26	DAR; 36	RCH; 23	DOV; 26	CLT; 33	CAR; 23	MEM; 26	PHO; 33					26th	2470	
2000	HMV Motorsports	63	Ford																																HOM; DNQ				26th	2470	
2001	Davis & Weight Motorsports	55	Ford	DAY; 20	CAR; 20	LVS; 32	ATL; 41	DAR; 16	BRI; 40	TEX; 41	NSH; 21	TAL; 17	CAL	RCH					KEN; 16	MLW	GLN																		40th	1198	
2001	A. J. Foyt Racing	41	Chevy												NHA; 38	NZH	CLT	DOV																					40th	1198	
2001	PRW Racing	77	Ford																			CHI; 24	GTY	PPR	IRP	MCH	BRI	DAR											40th	1198	
2001	A. J. Foyt Racing	14	Chevy																										RCH; 36	DOV									40th	1198	
2001	ST Motorsports	59	Chevy																												KAN; 9	CLT; 29	MEM	PHO	CAR	HOM			40th	1198	
2002	Akins Motorsports	38	Ford	DAY	CAR	LVS	DAR; 17	BRI; 17	TEX	NSH	TAL	CAL	RCH; 28	NHA	NZH; 33	CLT; 35	DOV; 15	NSH; 12		MLW; 22	DAY	CHI; 41	GTY; 22	PPR; 19	IRP	MCH	BRI; 37	DAR	RCH; 16	DOV; 20	KAN; 16	CLT; 30	MEM; 38	ATL; 28	CAR; 19	PHO; 14	HOM; 30		32nd	1896	
2002	ST Motorsports	59	Chevy																KEN; QL^{†}																				32nd	1896	
2003	Akins Motorsports	98	Ford	DAY	CAR	LVS	DAR	BRI	TEX	TAL	NSH	CAL	RCH	GTY	NZH; 16	CLT	DOV	NSH	KEN	MLW	DAY	CHI	NHA	PPR	IRP	MCH													70th	467	
2003	Ortec Racing	96	Chevy																								BRI; 27	DAR	RCH	DOV; 20	KAN	CLT	MEM	ATL	PHO				70th	467	
2003	Jay Robinson Racing	39	Ford																																	CAR; 27			70th	467	
2003	Montgomery Motorsports	80	Pontiac																																		HOM; 26		70th	467	
2004	ST Motorsports	47	Ford	DAY	CAR	LVS	DAR	BRI	TEX	NSH	TAL; QL^{‡}																												40th	1097	
2004	Jay Robinson Racing	39	Ford									CAL; 42						NSH; 28	KEN; 23	MLW; 23	DAY	CHI																	40th	1097	
2004	Jay Robinson Racing	28	Ford										GTY; 35	RCH; 43			DOV; 39						NHA; 35	PPR; 41			BRI; 42	CAL	RCH; 41	DOV									40th	1097	
2004	Jay Robinson Racing	49	Ford												NZH; 21	CLT									IRP; 32	MCH													40th	1097	
2004	Keith Coleman Racing	26	Chevy																												KAN; 34	CLT; 24	MEM; 34	ATL; 23	PHO; 33	DAR	HOM; DNQ		40th	1097	
2005	Keith Coleman Racing	26	Chevy	DAY; DNQ	CAL	MXC	LVS	ATL																															38th	1423	
2005	GIC-Mixon Motorsports	7	Chevy						NSH; 40	BRI; 23	TEX; DNQ																												38th	1423	
2005	Keith Coleman Racing	23	Chevy									PHO; 22	TAL; 11	DAR; 22	RCH; 22	CLT; 25	DOV; 32	NSH; 41	KEN; 33	MLW; 28	DAY; DNQ	CHI; DNQ	NHA; 27	PPR; 20	GTY; 38	IRP; 21	GLN; DNQ	MCH; 33	BRI; 28	CAL; DNQ	RCH; DNQ	DOV; 41	KAN; DNQ	CLT; DNQ	MEM; DNQ	TEX	PHO	HOM	38th	1423	
2006	Biagi Brothers Racing	4	Dodge	DAY; 10	CAL; 43	MXC	LVS; 31	ATL; 28	BRI; 22	TEX; 33	NSH; 38	PHO; 15	TAL; 28	RCH; 15	DAR; 27	CLT	DOV	NSH																					45th	934	
2006	Michael Waltrip Racing	99	Dodge																KEN; QL^{±}	MLW	DAY	CHI	NHA	MAR	GTY	IRP	GLN	MCH	BRI	CAL	RCH	DOV	KAN	CLT					45th	934	
2006	Joe Gibbs Racing	18	Chevy																																MEM; QL^{¤}	TEX	PHO	HOM	45th	934	
2007	ML Motorsports	70	Chevy	DAY	CAL	MXC	LVS	ATL	BRI	NSH	TEX	PHO	TAL	RCH	DAR	CLT	DOV	NSH	KEN	MLW; 21	NHA	DAY; 32	CHI; 30	GTY; 19				MCH; 39	BRI; 25	CAL	RCH; 28	DOV	KAN; 24	CLT	MEM	TEX; 36	PHO	HOM; 30	58th	705	
2007	Michael Waltrip Racing	99	Toyota																						IRP; QL^{±}														58th	705	
2007	Fitz Racing	44	Dodge																							CGV; 40	GLN												58th	705	
2008	ML Motorsports	70	Chevy	DAY; 41	CAL	LVS	ATL	BRI; 24	NSH; 26	TEX; 28	PHO	MXC	TAL; 5	RCH; 22	DAR	CLT	DOV	NSH; 14	KEN; 22	MLW; 13	NHA	DAY; 30	CHI; 22	GTY; 14	IRP; 21	CGV	GLN	MCH; 23	BRI; 24	CAL	RCH; 22	DOV	KAN; 22	CLT; DNQ	MEM; 30	TEX; 20	PHO	HOM; DNQ	30th	1835	
2009	ML Motorsports	70	Chevy	DAY; 18	CAL	LVS	BRI; DNQ	TEX																															36th	1498	
2009	JD Motorsports	0	Chevy						NSH; DNQ	PHO; 38		RCH; 40	DAR; 39	CLT; 41	DOV; 39	NSH; 43	KEN; 19																						36th	1498	
2009	JD Motorsports	04	Chevy								TAL; 43																												36th	1498	
2009	Jay Robinson Racing	49	Chevy															MLW; 35	NHA; 36	DAY; 39	CHI; 43	GTY; 35	IRP; 43	IOW; 38	GLN; 38	MCH; 36	BRI; 38	CGV; 33	ATL; 40	RCH; 38	DOV; 42	KAN; 38	CAL; 35	CLT; 38	MEM; DNQ	TEX; 43	PHO; 34	HOM; 26	36th	1498	
2010	Jay Robinson Racing	49	Chevy	DAY; Wth		LVS; 41	BRI; DNQ	NSH; 41		TEX; 42	TAL; 28	RCH; 41				NSH; 36	KEN; 40			DAY; 41	CHI; 38	GTY; 43	IRP; 39	IOW; 34		MCH; 26	BRI; 36			RCH; 35		KAN; DNQ		CLT; 40	GTY; DNQ	TEX; DNQ		HOM; 25	29th	1802	
2010	ML Motorsports	70	Chevy		CAL; 32				PHO; DNQ				DAR; 22	DOV; 31	CLT; 43			ROA; 22	NHA; 33						GLN; 24			CGV; 19	ATL; 32		DOV; 26		CAL; 27				PHO; 38		29th	1802	
2011	Jay Robinson Racing	49	Chevy	DAY	PHO	LVS	BRI	CAL	TEX	TAL	NSH	RCH	DAR	DOV	IOW	CLT	CHI	MCH	ROA	DAY	KEN	NHA	NSH; 40	IRP; 35	IOW; 37	GLN; 40	CGV	BRI; 38	ATL; 42	RCH; 40	CHI; 35	DOV; 36	KAN; DNQ	CLT; DNQ	TEX; DNQ	PHO; 36	HOM; DNQ		53rd	61	
^{†} - Qualified for Stacy Compton · ^{‡} - Qualified for Robert Pressley · ^{±} - Qualified for David Reutimann · ^{¤} - Qualified for J. J. Yeley

==== Craftsman Truck Series ====
NASCAR Craftsman Truck Series results
Year	Team	No.	Make	1	2	3	4	5	6	7	8	9	10	11	12	13	14	15	16	17	18	19	20	21	22	23	24	25	26	NCTC	Pts	Ref
1997	Brewco Motorsports	37	Chevy	WDW	TUS	HOM	PHO	POR	EVG	I70	NHA	TEX	BRI	NZH	MLW; 12	LVL	CNS	HPT	IRP; 11	FLM	NSV	GLN	RCH	MAR	SON	MMR	CAL	PHO	LVS	72nd	257	

=== ARCA Menards Series ===
(key) (Bold – Pole position awarded by qualifying time. Italics – Pole position earned by points standings or practice time. * – Most laps led.)

ARCA Menards Series results
Year	Team	No.	Make	1	2	3	4	5	6	7	8	9	10	11	12	13	14	15	16	17	18	19	20	21	22	23	24	25	AMSC	Pts	Ref
2001	Roulo Brothers Racing	39	Ford	DAY	NSH	WIN	SLM	GTY	KEN	CLT	KAN	MCH	POC	MEM	GLN	KEN	MCH	POC	NSH	ISF	CHI; 21	DSF	SLM	TOL	BLN	CLT	TAL	ATL	149th	125	
2021	Young's Motorsports	02	Chevy	DAY	PHO	TAL	KAN	TOL	CLT	MOH; 17	POC	ELK	BLN	IOW	WIN	GLN	MCH	ISF	MLW	DSF	BRI	SLM	KAN						102nd	27	
