= Mike Dillon (racing driver) =

American racing driver

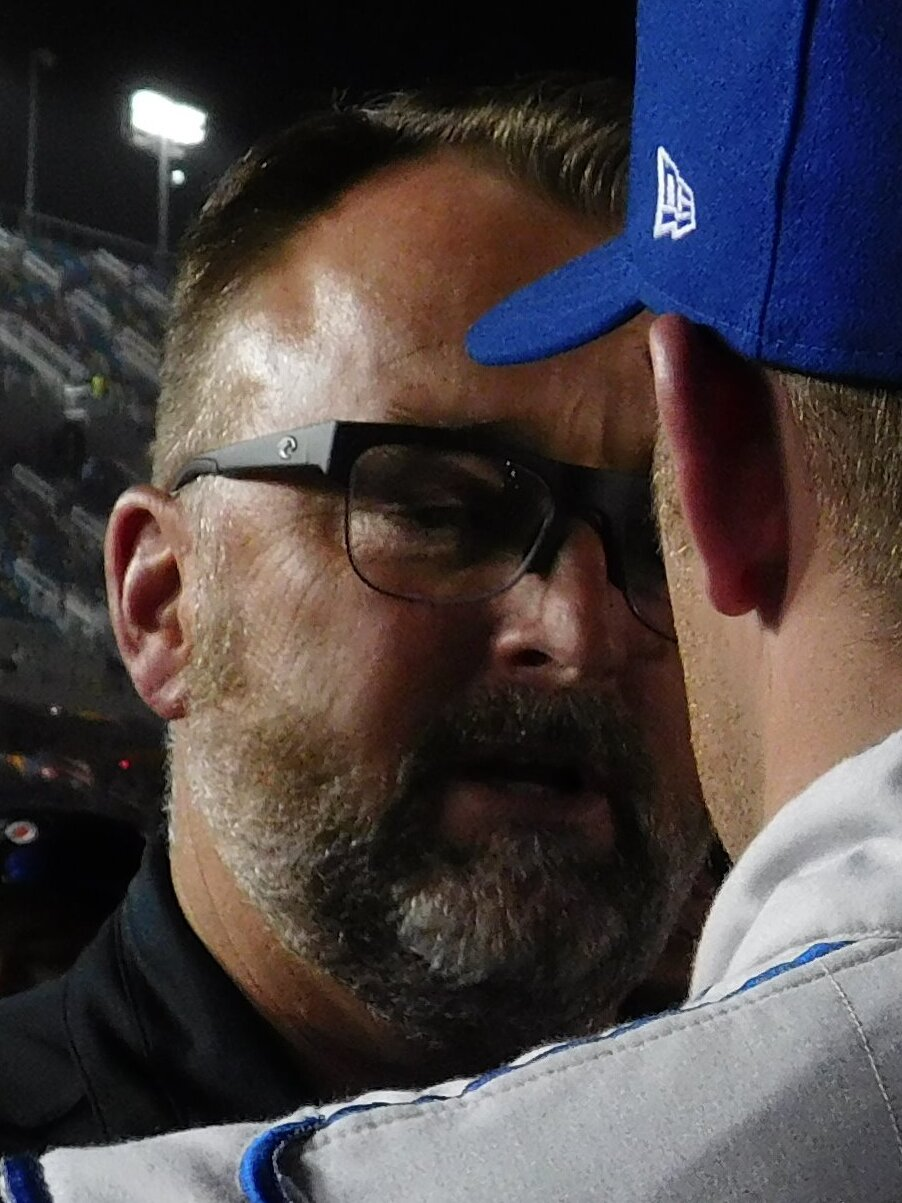
- Dillon at the 2017 Daytona 500
- Born: Michael Dillon; February 1, 1965 (age 61); Lexington, North Carolina, U.S.

NASCAR Cup Series career
- 1 race run over 1 year
- Best finish: 66th (1998)
- First race: 1998 California 500 (Fontana)
Wins	Top tens	Poles
0	0	0

NASCAR O'Reilly Auto Parts Series career
- 154 races run over 7 years
- Best finish: 12th (1998)
- First race: 1995 Sundrop 400 (Hickory)
- Last race: 2001 Cheez-It 250 (Bristol)
Wins	Top tens	Poles
0	15	0

NASCAR FedEx Freight Truck Series career
- 3 races run over 2 years
- Best finish: 79th (1999)
- First race: 1997 GM Goodwrench / Delco 300 (Phoenix)
- Last race: 1999 DieHard 200 (Milwaukee)
Wins	Top tens	Poles
0	0	0

Michael Dillon (born February 1, 1965) is an American former professional stock car racing driver for Richard Childress Racing and the current General Manager for the team after having raced in all three national series. He is the father of Austin Dillon and Ty Dillon and the son-in-law of Richard Childress.

== Racing career ==
=== Winston Cup Series ===
Dillon made one Cup Series start in his career. Subbing for the injured Mike Skinner, he qualified the No. 31 Lowe's Chevrolet in the 27th position in the 1998 Fontana race. Dillon struggled in the race, finishing 35th, eleven laps down.

Dillon also competed in the 1997 Mountain Dew Southern 500 as a relief driver for Dale Earnhardt, finishing the race after Earnhardt blacked out on the first lap.

=== Busch Series ===
Dillon made his NASCAR debut in 1995. That year he ran five of twenty-six races for Richard Childress Racing in the No. 12 Kennametal/Salem National Lease Chevrolet, making his debut at Hickory, where he started twelfth and finished sixteenth. He would make his next start at Myrtle Beach, getting his first career top-ten starting spot of ninth, before leading five laps en route to a seventeenth place finish. He would then follow it up with an eighteenth place result at South Boston Speedway. Dillon crashed out of the other two races, with a 42nd at Charlotte and 29th at Rockingham. However, he did beat his best career start with an eighth place start in Charlotte.

Dillon ran for NASCAR Busch Series Rookie of the Year in 1996 in the No. 72 Detroit Gasket Chevy for Parker Racing, but only made 21 of 26 races and struggled to 23rd in points. He earned his first career top-ten of tenth at South Boston.

Dillon made all the races in 1997, and finished 15th in points. Still running in the No. 72, Dillon scored his first career top-five at Dover. He also added on a pair of sixth and a tenth to have four top-ten finishes. Dillon set his career best start of fourth at Richmond, and also led 21 laps at Gateway before a late crash.

Dillon's best career season came in 1998. He had two top-fives and seven top-tens en route to twelfth in points. The two top-fives were a fourth at Hickory (led 54 laps) and a fifth at Watkins Glen International.

In 1999, Dillon moved to the No. 59 Kingsford team owned by ST Motorsports. He did not qualify for two of the races and that relegated him to sixteenth in the final points. In addition, Dillon only had one top-ten, with a seventh place coming at Watkins Glen. Despite the lack of top-tens, Dillon stayed in sixteenth in points largely because he finished all but two of his races.

In 2000, Dillon moved back to Richard Childress Racing (RCR), driving the newly formed No. 21 Rockwell Automation Chevrolet. Dillon did not improve that much, as he did not qualify for the season ending race at Miami, and his best finishes were a pair of top-tens. (ninth at Daytona and eighth at Dover). The result was 23rd in points.

Dillon's driving career ended in 2001 after getting injured in a wreck at Bristol Motor Speedway. Before then, Dillon had no top-tens and his best 2001 finish was eighteenth at Atlanta. The following was a quote from RCR:

"Richard Childress Racing (RCR) named Mike Skinner as the driver for its BGN No. 21 Rockwell Automation team this weekend at Texas while fulltime driver Mike Dillon recuperates from injuries sustained from a March 24 crash at Bristol. "Mike (Dillon) took a hard lick at Bristol so he's pretty sore and stiff," said Richard Childress, president and CEO of Richard Childress Racing Enterprises, Inc. "He also took a hard lick a couple of weeks ago testing in Nashville. Everyone knows racing at Texas Motor Speedway can be very tough. So, to do what's best for our team and for Rockwell Automation, we've asked Skinner to step in for now to get the job done." None of Dillon's injuries were serious and a CT scan proved negative. His status will be reevaluated after this weekend."

Dillon was more injured than originally thought, and eventually, Dillon quietly stepped aside from the team. He currently serves as the General Manager of Richard Childress Racing's three NASCAR Cup teams. Beginning in 2007, Dillon was the spotter for the Richard Childress owned No. 33, then driven by Clint Bowyer.

=== Craftsman Truck Series ===
Dillon made three career starts in the Craftsman Truck Series, all for Richard Childress. In 1997, Dillon made his debut at Phoenix driving the No. 33 Realtree Chevy, where he started 29th and finished 26th.

The other two starts were in 1999, running at Watkins Glen and Milwaukee. The 26th in '97 would remain his best finish as he finished 30th at the Glen and 32nd at Milwaukee. However, he did set his career best start of 24th at Watkins Glen.

== Personal life ==
Dillon's sons Austin and Ty compete in the NASCAR Cup Series. Mike is the son-in-law of Richard Childress.

== Motorsports career results ==
=== NASCAR ===
(key) (Bold – Pole position awarded by qualifying time. Italics – Pole position earned by points standings or practice time. * – Most laps led.)

==== Winston Cup Series ====
NASCAR Winston Cup Series results
Year	Team	No.	Make	1	2	3	4	5	6	7	8	9	10	11	12	13	14	15	16	17	18	19	20	21	22	23	24	25	26	27	28	29	30	31	32	33	NWCC	Pts	Ref
1997	Richard Childress Racing	3	Chevy	DAY	CAR	RCH	ATL	DAR	TEX	BRI	MAR	SON	TAL	CLT	DOV	POC	MCH	CAL	DAY	NHA	POC	IND	GLN	MCH	BRI	DAR; RL^{†}	RCH	NHA	DOV	MAR	CLT	TAL	CAR	PHO	ATL		NA	-	n/a
1998	Richard Childress Racing	31	Chevy	DAY	CAR	LVS	ATL	DAR	BRI	TEX	MAR	TAL	CAL; 35	CLT	DOV	RCH	MCH	POC	SON	NHA	POC	IND	GLN	MCH	BRI	NHA	DAR	RCH	DOV	MAR	CLT	TAL	DAY	PHO	CAR	ATL	66th	58	
^{†} – Relieved Dale Earnhardt in race.

==== Busch Series ====
NASCAR Busch Series results
Year	Team	No.	Make	1	2	3	4	5	6	7	8	9	10	11	12	13	14	15	16	17	18	19	20	21	22	23	24	25	26	27	28	29	30	31	32	33	NBSC	Pts	Ref
1993				DAY	CAR	RCH	DAR	BRI	HCY	ROU	MAR	NZH	CLT	DOV	MYB	GLN	MLW	TAL	IRP	MCH	NHA	BRI	DAR	RCH	DOV	ROU	CLT	MAR	CAR	HCY; DNQ	ATL						NA	-	
1995	Richard Childress Racing	12	Chevy	DAY	CAR	RCH	ATL	NSV	DAR	BRI	HCY; 16	NHA	NZH	CLT	DOV	MYB; 17	GLN	MLW	TAL	SBO; 18	IRP	MCH	BRI	DAR	RCH	DOV	CLT; 42	CAR; 29	HOM								54th	449	
1996	Parker Racing	72	Chevy	DAY; 15	CAR; 32	RCH; 23	ATL; 14	NSV; 20	DAR; 26	BRI; DNQ	HCY; 26	NZH; 25	CLT; DNQ	DOV; 38	SBO; 10	MYB; 21	GLN; 19	MLW; 33	NHA; 23	TAL; 29	IRP; 21	MCH; 35	BRI	DAR; 22	RCH; 18	DOV; 28	CLT; DNQ	CAR; 15	HOM; DNQ								23rd	1945	
1997	Parker Racing	72	Chevy	DAY; 18	CAR; 31	RCH; 14	ATL; 26	LVS; 10	DAR; 27	HCY; 16	TEX; 13	BRI; 31	NSV; 34	TAL; 15	NHA; 35	NZH; 21	CLT; 14	DOV; 19	SBO; 15	GLN; 18	MLW; 31	MYB; 6	GTY; 19	IRP; 11	MCH; 38	BRI; 30	DAR; 39	RCH; 16	DOV; 4	CLT; 33	CAL; 6	CAR; 23	HOM; 21				15th	3008	
1998	Parker Racing	72	Chevy	DAY; 24	CAR; 8	LVS; 7	NSV; 42	DAR; 6	BRI; 31	TEX; 14	HCY; 4	TAL; 17	NHA; 19	NZH; 15	CLT; 21	DOV; 15	RCH; 37	PPR; 24	GLN; 5	MLW; 16	MYB; 20	CAL; 10	SBO; 16	IRP; 14	MCH; 13	BRI; 40	DAR; 40	RCH; 26	DOV; 19	CLT; 18	GTY; 32	CAR; 7	ATL; 33	HOM; 24			12th	3250	
1999	ST Motorsports	59	Chevy	DAY; 18	CAR; 19	LVS; DNQ	ATL; 13	DAR; 34	TEX; 28	NSV; 18	BRI; 32	TAL; 26	CAL; 13	NHA; 32	RCH; 13	NZH; 21	CLT; DNQ	DOV; 16	SBO; 27	GLN; 7	MLW; 35	MYB; 30	PPR; 27	GTY; 31	IRP; 23	MCH; 19	BRI; 23	DAR; 31	RCH; 27	DOV; 13	CLT; 12	CAR; 33	MEM; 18	PHO; 37	HOM; 27		16th	2795	
2000	Richard Childress Racing	21	Chevy	DAY; 9	CAR; 17	LVS; 22	ATL; 19	DAR; 13	BRI; 37	TEX; 38	NSV; 37	TAL; 34	CAL; 28	RCH; 19	NHA; 36	CLT; 18	DOV; 32	SBO; 20	MYB; 37	GLN; 19	MLW; 25	NZH; 37	PPR; 20	GTY; 32	IRP; 12	MCH; 22	BRI; 32	DAR; 21	RCH; 17	DOV; 8	CLT; 20	CAR; 36	MEM; 27	PHO; 31	HOM; DNQ		23rd	2743	
2001	Richard Childress Racing	21	Chevy	DAY; 29	CAR; 19	LVS; 18	ATL; 20	DAR; 28	BRI; 37	TEX	NSH	TAL	CAL	RCH	NHA	NZH	CLT	DOV	KEN	MLW	GLN	CHI	GTY	PPR	IRP	MCH	BRI	DAR	RCH	DOV	KAN	CLT	MEM	PHO	CAR	HOM	56th	525	

==== Craftsman Truck Series ====
NASCAR Craftsman Truck Series results
Year	Team	No.	Make	1	2	3	4	5	6	7	8	9	10	11	12	13	14	15	16	17	18	19	20	21	22	23	24	25	26	NCWTC	Pts	Ref
1997	Richard Childress Racing	33	Chevy	WDW	TUS	HOM	PHO	POR	EVG	I70	NHA	TEX	BRI	NZH	MLW	LVL	CNS	HPT	IRP	FLM	NSV	GLN	RCH	MAR	SON	MMR	CAL	PHO; 16	LVS	114th	85	
1999	Richard Childress Racing	8	Chevy	HOM	PHO	EVG	MMR	MAR	MEM	PPR	I70	BRI	TEX	PIR	GLN; 30	MLW; 32	NSV	NZH	MCH	NHA	IRP	GTY	HPT	RCH	LVS	LVL	TEX	CAL		79th	140	
