= 1997 NASCAR Busch Series =

American motorsport season

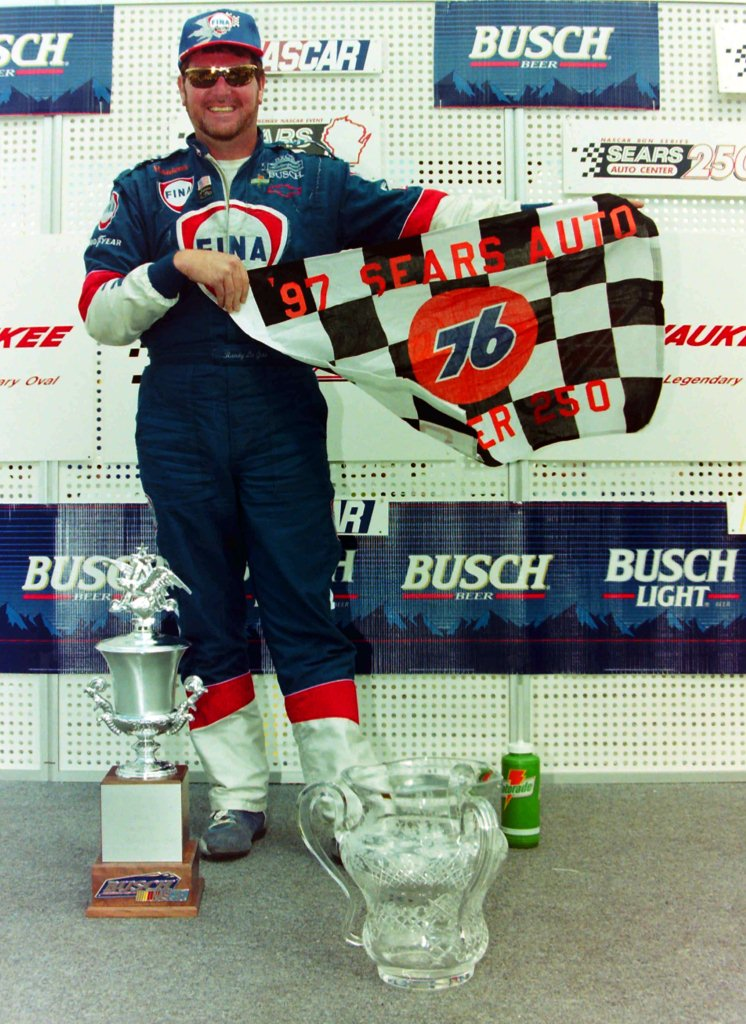
Randy LaJoie, the 1997 Busch Series champion

The 1997 NASCAR Busch Series began February 15 and ended November 9. Randy LaJoie of BACE Motorsports won the championship.

== Teams and drivers ==
=== Complete schedule ===
List of full-time teams at the start of 1997.

Team	Car(s)	No.	Driver(s)	Listed owner(s)
Akins-Sutton Motorsports	Ford Thunderbird	38	Elton Sawyer	Bob Sutton
BACE Motorsports	Chevrolet Monte Carlo	33	Tim Fedewa	Barbara Baumgardner
BACE Motorsports	Chevrolet Monte Carlo	74	Randy LaJoie	Bill Baumgardner
Bill Elliott Racing	Ford Thunderbird	94	Ron Barfield	Bill Elliott
Brewco Motorsports	Chevrolet Monte Carlo	37	Mark Green	Clarence Brewer
Buckshot Racing	Pontiac Grand Prix	00	Buckshot Jones	Billy Jones
Crestinger Racing	Chevrolet Monte Carlo	20	Jimmy Spencer	Allen Crestinger
Dale Earnhardt, Inc.	Chevrolet Monte Carlo	3	Steve Park (R)	Dale Earnhardt
Dale Earnhardt, Inc.	Chevrolet Monte Carlo	31	Dale Earnhardt Jr. 8	Dale Earnhardt
Diamond Ridge Motorsports	Chevrolet Monte Carlo	1	Hermie Sadler	Gary Bechtel
Diamond Ridge Motorsports	Chevrolet Monte Carlo	8	Jeff Green	Gary Bechtel
Diamond Ridge Motorsports	Chevrolet Monte Carlo	29	Elliott Sadler	Gary Bechtel
Donald Laird Racing	Ford Thunderbird	96	Stevie Reeves	Donald Laird
Ridling Motorsports	Chevrolet Monte Carlo	43	Dennis Setzer	David Ridling
Ridling Motorsports	Chevrolet Monte Carlo	88	Kevin Lepage	David Ridling
Hensley Motorsports	Chevrolet Monte Carlo	63	Tracy Leslie	Hubert Hensley
DAJ Racing	Ford Thunderbird	32	Dale Jarrett	Horace Isenhower
J&J Racing	Chevrolet Monte Carlo	99	Glenn Allen Jr.	Bill Papke
Joe Bessey Motorsports	Chevrolet Monte Carlo	6	Joe Bessey	Nancy Bessey
KEL Racing	Chevrolet Monte Carlo	57	Jason Keller	Joe Keller
Key Motorsports	Ford Thunderbird	11	Jimmy Foster (R)	Curtis Key
Labonte Motorsports	Pontiac Grand Prix; Chevrolet Monte Carlo	44	Bobby Labonte 15	Bobby Labonte; Terry Labonte
Labonte Motorsports	Pontiac Grand Prix; Chevrolet Monte Carlo	44	Tony Stewart 5	Bobby Labonte; Terry Labonte
Labonte Motorsports	Pontiac Grand Prix; Chevrolet Monte Carlo	5	Andy Hillenburg 1	Bobby Labonte; Terry Labonte
Labonte Motorsports	Pontiac Grand Prix; Chevrolet Monte Carlo	5	Terry Labonte 14	Bobby Labonte; Terry Labonte
Labonte Motorsports	Pontiac Grand Prix; Chevrolet Monte Carlo	5	Brad Leighton 1	Bobby Labonte; Terry Labonte
Labonte Motorsports	Pontiac Grand Prix; Chevrolet Monte Carlo	5	Steve Grissom 1	Bobby Labonte; Terry Labonte
Labonte Motorsports	Pontiac Grand Prix; Chevrolet Monte Carlo	5	Jeff Fuller 1	Bobby Labonte; Terry Labonte
Laughin Racing	Chevrolet Monte Carlo	45	Greg Sacks	Mike Laughlin
Michael Waltrip Racing	Ford Thunderbird	21	Michael Waltrip	Buffy Waltrip
NorthStar Motorsports	Chevrolet Monte Carlo	89	Johnny Chapman (R)	Meredith Ruark
Parker Racing	Chevrolet Monte Carlo	72	Mike Dillon	Ron Parker
Phil Parsons Racing	Chevrolet Monte Carlo	10	Phil Parsons	Marcia Parsons
Phoenix Racing	Chevrolet Monte Carlo	4	Dale Shaw	James Finch
Porter Racing	Ford Thunderbird	48	Randy Porter	James Porter
PRW Racing	Ford Thunderbird	77	Jeff McClure (R)	John Walsh
Reiser Enterprises	Chevrolet Monte Carlo	17	Tim Bender 8	Robbie Reiser
Reiser Enterprises	Chevrolet Monte Carlo	17	Robbie Reiser 1	Robbie Reiser
Reiser Enterprises	Chevrolet Monte Carlo	17	Matt Kenseth (R) 20	Robbie Reiser
Roush Racing	Ford Thunderbird	9	Jeff Burton	Jack Roush
Roush Racing	Ford Thunderbird	60	Mark Martin	Jack Roush
Shoemaker Racing	Chevrolet Monte Carlo	64	Dick Trickle	Dennis Shoemaker
ST Motorsports	Chevrolet Monte Carlo	47	Jeff Fuller	Tad Geschickter
Stegall Motorsports	Chevrolet Monte Carlo	85	Shane Hall	Don Stegall
Taylor Motorsports	Ford Thunderbird	40	Jerry Robertson	Doug Taylor
Team 34	Chevrolet Monte Carlo	34	Mike McLaughlin	Frank Cicci
Team 34	Pontiac Grand Prix	36	Todd Bodine	Scott Welliver
Wellrich Motorsports	Chevrolet Monte Carlo	7	Mike Wallace 6	Ed Whitaker
Wellrich Motorsports	Chevrolet Monte Carlo	7	Dale Earnhardt Jr. 2	Ed Whitaker

=== Part-time schedule ===
No.	Driver	Make	Team	1996 result
2	Ricky Craven	Chevrolet	Ricky Craven Racing	29th
22	Scott Lagasse	Chevrolet	Super Sports Racing	new team
24	David Hutto	Chevrolet	Hutto Racing	104th
49	Kyle Petty	Chevrolet	Shaver Racing	72nd
51	Jim Bown	Chevrolet	Bown Racing	33rd
68	Jamie Aube	Chevrolet	Wegner Motorsports	none
70	Dale Fischlein	Chevrolet	Mike Stegall Racing	61st
81	Stanton Barrett	Chevrolet	Pro Tech Motorsports	3rd
87	Joe Nemechek	Chevrolet	NEMCO Motorsports	34th
91	Doug Reid III (R)	Chevrolet	Barney Walker Motorsports, Inc.	new team

== Schedule ==
No.	Race title	Track	Date
1	Gargoyles 300	Daytona International Speedway, Daytona Beach	February 15
2	GM Goodwrench Service 200	North Carolina Motor Speedway, Rockingham	February 22
3	Hardee's Fried Chicken 250	Richmond International Raceway, Richmond	March 1
4	Stihl Outdoor Power Tools 300	Atlanta Motor Speedway, Hampton	March 8
5	Las Vegas 300	Las Vegas Motor Speedway, Las Vegas	March 16
6	Diamond Hill Plywood 200	Darlington Raceway, Darlington	March 22
7	Galaxy Foods 300	Hickory Motor Speedway, Hickory	March 29
8	Coca-Cola 300	Texas Motor Speedway, Fort Worth	April 5
9	Moore's Snacks 250	Bristol Motor Speedway, Bristol	April 12
10	BellSouth Mobility/Opryland 320	Nashville Speedway USA, Nashville	April 19
11	Birmingham Auto Dealers Easycare 500k	Talladega Superspeedway, Talladega	April 26
12	United States Cellular 200	New Hampshire International Speedway, Loudon	May 10
13	CoreStates Advantage 200	Nazareth Speedway, Nazareth	May 18
14	Carquest Auto Parts 300	Charlotte Motor Speedway, Concord	May 24
15	GM Goodwrench/Delco Battery 200	Dover Downs International Speedway, Dover	May 31
16	Winston Motorsports 300	South Boston Speedway, South Boston	June 13
17	Lysol 200	Watkins Glen International, Watkins Glen	June 29
18	Sears Auto Center 250	The Milwaukee Mile, West Allis	July 6
19	Advance Auto Parts 250	Myrtle Beach Speedway, Myrtle Beach	July 12
20	Gateway 300	Gateway International Raceway, Madison	July 26
21	Kroger NASCAR 200 Presented by Ziploc	Indianapolis Raceway Park, Brownsburg	August 1
22	Detroit Gasket 200	Michigan Speedway, Brooklyn	August 16
23	Food City 250	Bristol Motor Speedway, Bristol	August 22
24	Dura Lube 200 Presented by Trak Automotive	Darlington Raceway, Darlington	August 30
25	Autolite Platinum 250	Richmond International Raceway, Richmond	September 5
26	MBNA 200	Dover Downs International Speedway, Dover	September 20
27	All Pro Bumper to Bumper 300	Charlotte Motor Speedway, Concord	October 4
28	Kenwood Home & Car Audio 300	California Speedway, Fontana	October 19
29	AC Delco 200	North Carolina Motor Speedway, Rockingham	October 25
30	Jiffy Lube Miami 300	Homestead Motorsports Complex, Homestead	November 9

== Races ==
=== Gargoyles 300 ===
The Gargoyles 300 was held on February 15 at Daytona International Speedway. Elliott Sadler won the pole.

Top ten results

1. 74–Randy LaJoie
2. 36–Todd Bodine
3. 21–Michael Waltrip
4. 87–Joe Nemechek
5. 63–Tracy Leslie
6. 45–Greg Sacks
7. 3–Steve Park
8. 37–Mark Green
9. 4–Jeff Purvis
10. 10–Phil Parsons

=== Goodwrench Service 200 ===
The Goodwrench Service 200 was held on February 22 at North Carolina Speedway. Mark Martin won the pole.

Top ten results

1. 60–Mark Martin
2. 32–Dale Jarrett
3. 74–Randy LaJoie
4. 10–Phil Parsons
5. 29–Elliott Sadler
6. 2–Ricky Craven
7. 36–Todd Bodine
8. 34–Mike McLaughlin
9. 99–Glenn Allen Jr.
10. 33–Tim Fedewa

=== Hardee's Fried Chicken 250 ===
The Hardee's Fried Chicken 250 was held on March 1 at Richmond International Raceway. Randy LaJoie won the pole.

Top ten results

1. 60–Mark Martin
2. 8–Jeff Green
3. 3–Steve Park
4. 10–Phil Parsons
5. 57–Jason Keller
6. 9–Jeff Burton
7. 36–Todd Bodine
8. 74–Randy LaJoie
9. 94–Ron Barfield
10. 44–Bobby Labonte

=== Stihl Outdoor Power Tools 300 ===
The Stihl Outdoor Power Tools 300 was held on March 8 at Atlanta Motor Speedway. Tim Bender won the pole.

Top ten results

1. 60–Mark Martin
2. 38–Elton Sawyer
3. 44–Bobby Labonte
4. 00–Buckshot Jones
5. 87–Joe Nemechek
6. 36–Todd Bodine
7. 33–Tim Fedewa
8. 10–Phil Parsons
9. 29–Elliott Sadler
10. 5–Terry Labonte

=== Las Vegas 300 ===
The inaugural Las Vegas 300 was held on March 16 at Las Vegas Motor Speedway. Jeff Green won the pole.

Top ten results

1. 8–Jeff Green
2. 64–Dick Trickle
3. 36–Todd Bodine
4. 21–Michael Waltrip
5. 4–Tim Steele
6. 45–Greg Sacks
7. 10–Phil Parsons
8. 3–Steve Park
9. 99–Glenn Allen Jr.
10. 72–Mike Dillon

=== Diamond Hill Plywood 200 ===
The Diamond Hill Plywood 200 was held on March 22 at Darlington Raceway. Elliott Sadler won the pole.

Top ten results

1. 74–Randy LaJoie
2. 9–Jeff Burton
3. 64–Dick Trickle
4. 60–Mark Martin
5. 10–Phil Parsons
6. 00–Buckshot Jones
7. 47–Jeff Fuller
8. 8–Jeff Green
9. 63–Tracy Leslie
10. 36–Todd Bodine

=== Galaxy Foods 300 ===
The Galaxy Foods 300 was held on March 29 at Hickory Motor Speedway. Todd Bodine won the pole.

Top ten results

1. 64–Dick Trickle
2. 74–Randy LaJoie
3. 33–Tim Fedewa
4. 8–Jeff Green
5. 36–Todd Bodine
6. 38–Elton Sawyer
7. 57–Jason Keller
8. 39–Elliott Sadler
9. 37–Mark Green
10. 34–Mike McLaughlin

=== Coca-Cola 300 ===
The inaugural Coca-Cola 300 was held on April 5 at Texas Motor Speedway. Jeff Green won the pole.

1. 60–Mark Martin
2. 20–Jimmy Spencer
3. 9–Jeff Burton
4. 36–Todd Bodine
5. 34–Mike McLaughlin
6. 10–Phil Parsons
7. 00–Buckshot Jones
8. 88–Kevin Lepage
9. 74–Randy LaJoie
10. 63–Tracy Leslie

=== Moore's Snacks 250 ===
The Moore's Snacks 250 was held on April 12 at Bristol Motor Speedway. Hermie Sadler won the pole.

Top ten results

1. 9–Jeff Burton
2. 34–Mike McLaughlin
3. 74–Randy LaJoie
4. 21–Michael Waltrip
5. 64–Dick Trickle
6. 3–Steve Park
7. 33–Tim Fedewa
8. 10–Phil Parsons
9. 57–Jason Keller
10. 00–Buckshot Jones

=== BellSouth Mobility/Opryland 320 ===
The BellSouth Mobility/Opryland 320 was held on April 19 at Nashville Speedway USA. Mike McLaughlin won the pole.

Top ten results

1. 3–Steve Park
2. 8–Jeff Green
3. 33–Tim Fedewa
4. 28–Jeff Purvis
5. 36–Todd Bodine
6. 74–Randy LaJoie
7. 1–Hermie Sadler
8. 88–Kevin Lepage
9. 43–Dennis Setzer
10. 00–Buckshot Jones

=== Birmingham Auto Dealers 500K ===
The Birmingham Auto Dealers 500K was held on April 26 at Talladega Superspeedway. Joe Nemechek won the pole.

Top ten results

1. 60–Mark Martin
2. 3–Steve Park
3. 8–Jeff Green
4. 49–Kyle Petty
5. 33–Tim Fedewa
6. 4–Tim Steele
7. 17–Matt Kenseth
8. 36–Todd Bodine
9. 94–Ron Barfield
10. 64–Dick Trickle

=== United States Cellular 200 ===
The United States Cellular 200 was held on May 10 at New Hampshire International Speedway. Randy LaJoie won the pole.

Top ten results

1. 34–Mike McLaughlin
2. 3–Steve Park
3. 47–Jeff Fuller
4. 38–Elton Sawyer
5. 10–Phil Parsons
6. 36–Todd Bodine
7. 74–Randy LaJoie
8. 80–Mark Krogh
9. 76–Tom Bolles
10. 4–Dale Shaw

=== CoreStates Advantage 200 ===
The CoreStates Advantage 200 was held on May 18 at Nazareth Speedway. Elliott Sadler won the pole.

Top ten results

1. 29–Elliott Sadler
2. 36–Todd Bodine
3. 74–Randy LaJoie
4. 8–Jeff Green
5. 4–Dale Shaw
6. 6–Joe Bessey
7. 57–Jason Keller
8. 34–Mike McLaughlin
9. 00–Buckshot Jones
10. 43–Dennis Setzer

=== Carquest Auto Parts 300 ===
The Carquest Auto Parts 300 was held on May 24 at Charlotte Motor Speedway. Mark Martin won the pole.

Top ten results

1. 87–Joe Nemechek
2. 88–Kevin Lepage
3. 60–Mark Martin
4. 20–Jimmy Spencer
5. 10–Phil Parsons
6. 00–Buckshot Jones
7. 34–Todd Bodine
8. 57–Jason Keller
9. 1–Hermie Sadler
10. 74–Randy LaJoie

=== GM Goodwrench/Delco Battery 200 ===
The GM Goodwrench/Delco Battery 200 was held on May 31 at Dover Downs International Speedway. Dick Trickle won the pole.

Top ten results

1. 44–Bobby Labonte
2. 9–Jeff Burton
3. 74–Randy LaJoie
4. 88–Kevin Lepage
5. 3–Steve Park
6. 32–Dale Jarrett
7. 36–Todd Bodine
8. 5–Terry Labonte
9. 38–Elton Sawyer
10. 21–Michael Waltrip

=== Winston Motorsports 300 ===
The Winston Motorsports 300 was held on June 13 at South Boston Speedway. Shane Hall won the pole.

Top ten results

1. 74–Randy LaJoie
2. 4–Dale Shaw
3. 00–Buckshot Jones
4. 88–Kevin Lepage
5. 38–Elton Sawyer
6. 17–Matt Kenseth
7. 57–Jason Keller
8. 34–Mike McLaughlin
9. 36–Todd Bodine
10. 6–Joe Bessey

=== Lysol 200 ===
The Lysol 200 was held on June 29 at Watkins Glen International. Joe Nemechek won the pole.

Top ten results

1. 34–Mike McLaughlin
2. 36–Todd Bodine
3. 87–Joe Nemechek
4. 20–Jimmy Spencer
5. 5–Terry Labonte
6. 3–Steve Park
7. 44–Bobby Labonte
8. 32–Dale Jarrett
9. 1–Hermie Sadler
10. 85–Shane Hall

=== Sears Auto Center 250 ===
The Sears Auto Center 250 was held on July 6 at The Milwaukee Mile. Tim Fedewa won the pole.

Top ten results

1. 74–Randy LaJoie
2. 29–Elliott Sadler
3. 1–Hermie Sadler
4. 00–Buckshot Jones
5. 3–Steve Park
6. 38–Elton Sawyer
7. 10–Phil Parsons
8. 4–Dale Shaw
9. 63–Tracy Leslie
10. 33–Tim Fedewa

=== Advance Auto Parts 250 ===
The Advance Auto Parts 250 was held on July 12 at Myrtle Beach Speedway. Elliott Sadler won the pole.

Top ten results

1. 29–Elliott Sadler
2. 34–Mike McLaughlin
3. 74–Randy LaJoie
4. 36–Todd Bodine
5. 38–Elton Sawyer
6. 72–Mike Dillon
7. 99–Glenn Allen Jr.
8. 28–Jeff Purvis
9. 3–Steve Park
10. 00–Buckshot Jones

=== Gateway 300 ===
The inaugural Gateway 300 was held on July 26 at Gateway International Raceway. Joe Bessey won the pole.

Top ten results

1. 29–Elliott Sadler
2. 57–Jason Keller
3. 4–Dale Shaw
4. 38–Elton Sawyer
5. 34–Mike McLaughlin
6. 33–Tim Fedewa
7. 45–Jeff Fuller
8. 37–Mark Green
9. 6–Joe Bessey
10. 43–Dennis Setzer

=== Kroger 200 presented by Ziploc ===
The Kroger 200 presented by Ziploc was held on August 1 at Indianapolis Raceway Park. Randy LaJoie won the pole.

Top ten results

1. 74–Randy LaJoie
2. 29–Elliott Sadler
3. 38–Elton Sawyer
4. 33–Tim Fedewa
5. 83–Wayne Grubb
6. 17–Matt Kenseth
7. 00–Buckshot Jones
8. 3–Steve Park
9. 56–Jeff Krogh
10. 57–Jason Keller

=== Detroit Gasket 200 ===
The Detroit Gasket 200 was held on August 16 at Michigan International Speedway. Hermie Sadler won the pole.

Top ten results

1. 3–Steve Park
2. 20–Jimmy Spencer
3. 44–Bobby Labonte
4. 9–Jeff Burton
5. 00–Buckshot Jones
6. 36–Todd Bodine
7. 31–Dale Earnhardt Jr.
8. 17–Matt Kenseth
9. 10–Phil Parsons
10. 4–Dale Shaw

Failed to qualify: Mark Day (#16), Lyndon Amick (#35), Greg Sacks (#50), Nathan Buttke (#78), Ron Barfield (#94), Doug Reid III (#97)

=== Food City 250 ===
The Food City 250 was held on August 22 at Bristol Motor Speedway. Randy LaJoie won the pole. Buckshot Jones, who finished 26th, received a 50–point penalty after intentionally trying to wreck Randy LaJoie.

Top ten results

1. 20–Jimmy Spencer
2. 3–Steve Park
3. 47–Robert Pressley
4. 74–Randy LaJoie
5. 75–Rick Wilson
6. 44–Bobby Labonte
7. 96–Stevie Reeves
8. 36–Todd Bodine
9. 45–Jeff Fuller
10. 88–Kevin Lepage

=== Dura Lube 200 presented by Trak Automotive ===
The Dura Lube 200 presented by Trak Automotive was held on August 30 at Darlington Raceway. Mark Martin won the pole. This was the first race run at the racetrack after the start-finish line was moved to the back straightaway.

Top ten results

1. 9–Jeff Burton
2. 34–Mike McLaughlin
3. 64–Dick Trickle
4. 44–Bobby Labonte
5. 3–Steve Park
6. 60–Mark Martin
7. 1–Hermie Sadler
8. 36–Todd Bodine
9. 29–Elliott Sadler
10. 2–Ricky Craven

=== Autolite Platinum 250 ===
The Autolite Platinum 250 was held on September 5 at Richmond International Raceway. Michael Waltrip won the pole.

Top ten results

1. 3–Steve Park
2. 74–Randy LaJoie
3. 9–Jeff Burton
4. 64–Dick Trickle
5. 00–Buckshot Jones
6. 4–Dale Shaw
7. 57–Jason Keller
8. 60–Mark Martin
9. 33–Tim Fedewa
10. 1–Hermie Sadler

=== MBNA 200 ===
The MBNA 200 was held on September 20 at Dover International Speedway. Dick Trickle won the pole.

Top ten results

1. 6–Joe Bessey
2. 74–Randy LaJoie
3. 17–Matt Kenseth
4. 72–Mike Dillon
5. 3–Steve Park
6. 29–Elliott Sadler
7. 63–Tracy Leslie
8. 99–Glenn Allen Jr.
9. 5–Terry Labonte
10. 34–Mike McLaughlin
- This would be the first and only win of Bessey's career.

=== All Pro Bumper to Bumper 300 ===
The All Pro Bumper to Bumper 300 was held on October 4 at Charlotte Motor Speedway. Joe Nemechek won the pole.

Top ten results

1. 20–Jimmy Spencer
2. 60–Mark Martin
3. 44–Tony Stewart
4. 9–Jeff Burton
5. 37–Mark Green
6. 3–Steve Park
7. 32–Dale Jarrett
8. 87–Joe Nemechek
9. 18–Bobby Labonte
10. 00–Buckshot Jones

=== Kenwood Home & Car Audio 300 ===
The inaugural Kenwood Home & Car Audio 300 was held on October 19 at California Speedway. Steve Park won the pole.

Top ten results

1. 36–Todd Bodine
2. 3–Steve Park
3. 17–Matt Kenseth
4. 21–Michael Waltrip
5. 47–Robert Pressley
6. 72–Mike Dillon
7. 99–Glenn Allen Jr.
8. 43–Dennis Setzer
9. 34–Mike McLaughlin
10. 74–Randy LaJoie

=== AC Delco 200 ===
The AC Delco 200 was held on October 25 at North Carolina Speedway. Jeff Burton won the pole.

Top ten results

1. 60–Mark Martin
2. 64–Dick Trickle
3. 2–Ricky Craven
4. 9–Jeff Burton
5. 1–Hermie Sadler
6. 3–Steve Park
7. 34–Mike McLaughlin
8. 37–Mark Green
9. 44–Tony Stewart
10. 47–Robert Pressley

=== Jiffy Lube Miami 300 ===
The Jiffy Lube Miami 300 was held on November 9 at Homestead Motorsports Complex. Mike McLaughlin won the pole.

Top ten results

1. 87–Joe Nemechek
2. 74–Randy LaJoie
3. 60–Mark Martin
4. 99–Glenn Allen Jr.
5. 20–Jimmy Spencer
6. 17–Matt Kenseth
7. 36–Todd Bodine
8. 88–Kevin Schwantz
9. 6–Joe Bessey
10. 33–Tim Fedewa
- This was a very emotional win for Nemechek, as his brother lost his life at HMS just 8 months earlier.

== Full Drivers' Championship ==
(key) Bold – Pole position awarded by time. Italics – Pole position set by owner's points. * – Most laps led.

Pos	Driver	DAY	CAR	RCH	ATL	LVS	DAR	HCY	TEX	BRI	NSV	TAL	NHA	NAZ	CLT	DOV	SBO	GLN	MIL	MYB	GTY	IRP	MCH	BRI	DAR	RCH	DOV	CLT	CAL	CAR	HOM	Pts
1	Randy LaJoie	1*	3	8	16	29	1*	2*	9	3	6	12	7	3	10	3	1*	21	1	3	17	**1***	17	**4**	18	2	2*	15	10	20	2	4381
2	Todd Bodine	2	7	7	6	3	10	5	4	30	5	8	6*	2	7	7	9	2	11	4	24	25	6	8	8	25	15	20	1	34	7	4115
3	Steve Park **(R)**	7	32	3	42	8	34	13	35	6	1*	2	2	29	16	5	13	6	5*	9	15	8	1	2	5	1	5	6	**2**	6	12	4080
4	Mike McLaughlin	33	8	27	17	24	33	10	5*	2*	**13**	35	1	8	33	23	8	1	13	2	5	37	13	16	2	32	10	13	9	7	**22**	3614
5	Elliott Sadler	**15**	5	26	9	30	**29**	8	20	14	30	16	34	**1***	21	12	22	11	2	**1***	1	2	18	41	9	21	6	14	26	28	15	3534
6	Phil Parsons	10	4	4	8	7	5	19	6	8	12	39	5	20	5	18	16	17	7	13	23	28	9	32	28	12	22	26	32	11	30	3523
7	Buckshot Jones	12	13	13	4	39	6	14	7	10	10	38	41	9	6	17	3	20	4	10	25	7	5	26	32	5	23	10	40	15	26	3437
8	Elton Sawyer	16	12	11	2	31	17	6	11	32	17	42	4	23	43	9	5	19	6	5	4	3	16	34	13	31	16	22	19	12	32	3419
9	Tim Fedewa	34	10	18	7	15	14	3	38	7	3	5	39	11	35	15	19	32	**10**	12	6	4	25	27	15	9	14	27	33	19	10	3398
10	Hermie Sadler	17	18	16	25	21	11	11	19	**21**	7	19	33	12	9	14	27	9	3	19	11	29	20	28	7	10	26	28	27	5	25	3340
11	Mark Green	8	14	12	13	25	19	9	34	40	21	24	22	14	19	24	23	15	15	15	8	26	12	13	22	19	11	5	41	8	18	3261
12	Kevin Lepage	22	37	23	21	13	21	20	8	28	8	13	19	15	2	4	4	12	26	11	12	32	28	10	20	23	32	34	12	33	17	3248
13	Jason Keller	37	39	5	24	32	18	7	12	9	16	11	31	7	8	13	7	14	17	29	2	10	21	29	37^{1}	7	13	21	17	18	35	3242
14	Dick Trickle	19	11	32	18	2	3	1	16	5	15	10		27	11	**37**	17	30	14		21	27	42	15	3	4	**38**	39	25	2	41	3074
15	Mike Dillon	18	31	14	26	10	27	16	13	31	34	15	35	21	14	19	15	18	31	6	19	11	38	30	39	16	4	33	6	23	21	3008
16	Glenn Allen Jr.	31	9	25	41	9	22	24	37	18	35	33	25	16	DNQ	25	21	29	16	7	14	13	15	37	11	24	8	17	7	21	4	2969
17	Tracy Leslie	5	28	40	37	18	9	26	10	35	25	17	20	19		27	18	13	9	14	16	17	34	19	19	36	7	31	15	37	20	2880
18	Joe Bessey	29	23	22	29	37	28	22	27	36	32	28	21	6	36	20	10	26	19	27	9	19	41	17	23	42	1	18	16	22	9	2835
19	Dennis Setzer	DNQ	20		31		23	18	29	23	9	37	11	10	DNQ	28	12	27	28	20	10	14	37	18	35	27	18	37	8	27	11	2541
20	Stevie Reeves	13	21	36	28	16	30	17	33	13	14	20	26	32	27	21	DNQ	16	27	24	42	21	29	7	17	43	20	24	37	26	DNQ	2528
21	Jeff Fuller	26	17	35	12	36	7	12	32	29	31	26	3	31	34	26			30	33	7	22	14	9	41	34	35	43	11	40	14	2515
22	Matt Kenseth **(R)**										11	7	40	34	22	11	6	36	12	17	27	6	8	20	12	22	3	12	3	32	6	2426
23	Shane Hall	38	38	42	38	14	40	23	22	24	24	22	24	30	32	31	**28**	10	24	21	18	35	33	38	26	17	19	DNQ	36	13	DNQ	2285
24	Mark Martin	35	**1***	1	1*		4		1	38		1*			**3**								11*		**6**	8		2*		1	3	2104
25	Johnny Chapman **(R)**	23	27	21	27	20	39	28	24	15	23	29	30	22	DNQ	35	11	31	25	28	22		27	12	36	35			42			2016
26	Jeff Burton	40		6*	14		2		3	1*					13	2							4		1*	3*		4		**4***		1948
27	Bobby Labonte		41	10	3	12			28						30	1*		7	18		20		3	6	4	QL	31	9	30*			1912
28	Jeff Green	14	34	2	11	**1***	8	4	**15**	12	2*	3	13	4	31																	1898
29	Michael Waltrip	3			15	4			26	4		14				10							23	40	33	**28**	36	30	4	14	19	1738
30	Jimmy Spencer	39				27			2			21			4			4			40		2	1*		11		1*			5	1576
31	Mark Krogh **(R)**		40	19			35	DNQ		34	37		8		26	32	DNQ	23	29	26	30	30	24	33	24	DNQ	33	DNQ	39	30	42	1481
32	Robert Pressley														DNQ		31	38	21	32	37	18	35	3	14	15	27	16	5	10	31	1465
33	Terry Labonte			43	10	28			18						12	8		5			26		19	31	42		9	11	18			1455
34	Greg Sacks	6	16	30	DNQ	6	16	15	14	33		34		18	15	38							DNQ					42		29	33	1420
35	Jeff Krogh **(R)**		DNQ	20			26	DNQ		26	27		23		DNQ	30	DNQ	22	20	31	DNQ	9	30	14	27	DNQ	40	DNQ	24	DNQ	29	1416
36	Dale Jarrett	45	2		23	11			23	DNQ					20	6		8					40	39		20		7			16	1364
37	Ron Barfield Jr.	DNQ	19	9	20	38	13		25	39		9			23	22							DNQ	24	16	DNQ	29	DNQ	22			1362
38	Randy Porter		24	33		19		27	39		40	32	14		DNQ	29	DNQ		33	23	39	23		25	38	DNQ	41			35	24	1320
39	Dale Shaw	30											10	5			2		8	35	3	24	10	42	31	6	34	DNQ			39	1258
40	Joe Nemechek	4			5	33						**41**			1*			**3***			29*							**8**			1*	1162
41	Nathan Buttke			DNQ			20			25	41				DNQ		14		36	18	33	16	DNQ	11	21	38		38		17		1135
42	Lyndon Amick **(R)**	44			35		38		40	DNQ	20							27	32		28	15	DNQ	23	29	DNQ	17	35	29	36	DNQ	1110
43	Ricky Craven		6				15						Wth		39	16			37		32		22		10		28	41		3		1063
44	Jeff Purvis	9	33	34	36						4				25		24			8						13					38	972
45	Rodney Combs	11	15	31	33	17	32	DNQ		20	28	DNQ																				743
46	Tim Steele **(R)**					5	37	25	21	19	26	6																				736
47	Dale Earnhardt Jr. **(R)**							DNQ			39							39			38		7	22				DNQ	34	16	13	684
48	Ed Berrier																						26		25	18	12	DNQ	13	41	27	655
49	Tim Bender **(R)**	27	26	29	**40**	34	25	30	17																							620
50	Rick Wilson				19		36			27	36				18									5	DNQ			36		DNQ		617
51	Jimmy Foster **(R)**	DNQ	35	41	30	40	31		41		22	40	16		42																	616
52	Jeff McClure **(R)**	DNQ	30	DNQ	DNQ	23	DNQ	DNQ	42	37	29	30	28	24	DNQ	36	DNQ		39													603
53	Scott Lagasse																				34	39	31		40		30	25	28	39	36	561
54	Larry Pearson									11	18				24					25		31	DNQ					32				555
55	Brad Teague									22										34	13	20		21								485
56	Doug Reid III **(R)**	28	29	37	34				30			27			DNQ				40		DNQ		DNQ									466
57	Tony Stewart																					34				40		3		9	37	459
58	Mike Wallace	41			22	35				17		23			37																	453
59	Stanton Barrett **(R)**	43	25	28	39		DNQ	DNQ																					14	31		438
60	Kyle Petty	24			DNQ							4			38						35		DNQ			33						422
61	Ted Christopher			17									18	13				35								37					34	392
62	Wayne Grubb			DNQ				DNQ					36				25					5				DNQ					28	377
63	Dale Fischlein	32			32							25			41						36		36								DNQ	372
64	Danny Edwards Jr.																			30	41	12				30	39					359
65	Chris Diamond **(R)**	DNQ						DNQ		DNQ	33				DNQ		20		34	DNQ	31			36	DNQ			DNQ	38	DNQ		353
66	Kevin Schwantz																											29	31	38	8	337
67	Jason Jarrett							21					17							22								DNQ		DNQ		309
68	Doug Heveron	21	22	24	DNQ																											288
69	Sterling Marlin											18			17	33																285
70	Curtis Markham									42			12													14						285
71	Mark Day	DNQ							36		38	31			DNQ				38		DNQ	DNQ	DNQ	35				DNQ				281
72	Mike Olsen		DNQ	39				31	DNQ				29	26												29				DNQ		268
73	Joey McCarthy		42	DNQ						DNQ			37	28					35							DNQ	42					263
74	Jerry Robertson					22		29	31			DNQ																				243
75	Ed Spencer III		36	15		42	DNQ			DNQ						DNQ																210
76	Brad Loney																29													25	40	207
77	Blaise Alexander																												20	24	DNQ	194
78	Ted Musgrave						12					36																				182
79	Kevin Grubb			DNQ				DNQ					38				32					36				DNQ	21					171
80	Andy Hillenburg	20														34																164
81	Jim Bown	36																							34			40				159
82	Rick Fuller																		22			38									DNQ	146
83	Tom Bolles												9	17																		138
84	David Hutto **(R)**	42					24								DNQ																	128
85	Andy Santerre												15																			118
86	Jim Sauter										QL								QL	16												115
87	Johnny Rumley							DNQ			42						30															110
88	Rob Wilson												32					41														107
89	Chad Chaffin										19																					106
90	Robbie Faggart																											19				106
91	Bobby Dotter																		23													94
92	Gary Laton																											23		DNQ		94
93	Peter Gibbons																												23			94
94	Hank Parker Jr.																														23	94
95	John Preston																	DNQ								DNQ	24	DNQ			DNQ	91
96	Ron Fellows																	25														88
97	Hal Browning																										25					88
98	Brad Payne		DNQ	DNQ		26	DNQ				DNQ										DNQ											85
99	Kenny Wallace								DNQ												DNQ					26						85
100	Brad Leighton												27																			82
101	Ernie Irvan														28																	79
102	Scott Gaylord																	28														79
103	Kevin Simmons														29										30			DNQ		DNQ		73
104	Russell Brown																	33														64
105	Joe Nott																					33										64
106	Joe Pezza																	34														61
107	Bill Hoff													35							DNQ				DNQ	DNQ	DNQ			DNQ		58
108	Loy Allen Jr.				DNQ		DNQ																						35			58
109	Louis Rettenmeier																	37														52
110	Tim Zock																										37					52
111	Brandon Butler			38																												49
112	Patty Moise															39		DNQ														46
113	David Bonnett																						39									46
114	Steve Grissom																									39						46
115	Morgan Shepherd									16					40								32					DNQ				43
116	Robbie Reiser									41																						40
117	Michael Ritch														DNQ											41					DNQ	40
118	Robbie Crouch												42																			37
119	Shawn Hendricks																	42														37
120	Perry Tripp																				DNQ									42		37
121	Stacy Puryear																26															
122	Doug Taylor					41																										
123	Brian Simo																	40														
124	Rusty Wallace																												21			
125	Jamie Aube	25																														
126	Bryan Wall													25																		
127	Mike Stefanik													33																		
128	Kenny Irwin Jr.	DNQ							DNQ													DNQ										
129	Junior Purcell			DNQ																												
130	Joe Bean					DNQ																										
131	Jerry Nadeau											DNQ																				
132	Eddie Beahr															DNQ				DNQ						DNQ	DNQ					
133	Lou Gigliotti																	DNQ														
134	Kat Teasdale																	DNQ														
135	Thomas Daw																			DNQ												
136	Bobby Hillin Jr.																				DNQ											
137	Scot Walters																				DNQ											
138	Greg Edwards																							DNQ								
139	Eddie Johnson																							DNQ								
140	Mark Whitaker																							DNQ								
141	Mike Skinner																											DNQ				
142	L. W. Miller																											DNQ				
143	J. D. Gibbs																													DNQ		
144	Martin Truex Sr.																													DNQ		
145	Shane Jenkins																														DNQ	
146	Jack Sprague																		QL													
147	Ron Hornaday Jr.																		QL													
Pos	Driver	DAY	CAR	RCH	ATL	LVS	DAR	HCY	TEX	BRI	NSV	TAL	NHA	NAZ	CLT	DOV	SBO	GLN	MIL	MYB	GTY	IRP	MCH	BRI	DAR	RCH	DOV	CLT	CAL	CAR	HOM	Pts

1. Jason Keller made an illegal driver change before the start of the race and thus was not awarded any points or money.

== Rookie of the Year ==
Steve Park was the only rookie candidate to compete full-time in 1997, picking up three wins and finishing 3rd in points. Matt Kenseth was the top runner-up, despite replacing fellow candidate Tim Bender several races into the season. Johnny Chapman began the year with NorthStar Motorsports, but was released with several races to go in the season. Brothers Jeff and Mark Krogh came in from the Northwest driving for their family-owned team, each posting one top-ten apiece. Lyndon Amick and Dale Earnhardt Jr. were the only other rookie contenders in 1997.

== See also ==
- 1997 NASCAR Winston Cup Series
- 1997 NASCAR Craftsman Truck Series
- 1997 NASCAR Winston West Series
- 1997 NASCAR Goody's Dash Series
