= Jimmy Foster (racing driver) =

American racing driver

Jimmy Foster (born March 1, 1977, in Ormond Beach, Florida) is a United States former NASCAR driver. He was a part-time driver on the Busch Series from 1997 to 1999.

Before competing in the Busch Series, Foster was an avid competitor at Florida tracks, winning more than 200 races by the age of 15. He then competed in the NASCAR Goody's Dash Series in 1996, winning once and clinching the series' Rookie of the Year award while finishing seventh in series points. His season got off to a wild start at Daytona though; while running second, a tire blew on his car, sending him spinning before his car went airborne on the tri-oval for several feet before landing back on the track. He walked away okay, but the accident marked the last straw by Goody's Dash officials regarding airborne crashes as they mandated the roof flaps on all the cars, just like in NASCAR's top tier series, starting the next year in 1997, however airborne crashes and flips were still very common throughout the rest of the series' existence.

Foster made his Busch Series debut the next year in 1997, running the No. 11 Key Motorsports Chevy at North Carolina Speedway, Rockingham. He started 36th and only managed to finish 35th. However, he was able to complete the race. Foster gradually improved as he would end up making ten starts in all in the season. His best run was a 16th at New Hampshire International Speedway and started 13th at Lowe's Motor Speedway, Charlotte. However, inconsistently weighed the team down and Foster was ultimately released. He did not finish in five of ten starts and managed only 51st in points. He did not race further in the season.

Foster ran five races in 1998, all for Washington-Erving Motorsports. He struggled in his starts, only finishing one race. That race, at Nashville Speedway USA, was his best finish of the year with a 25th. Foster's qualifying was significantly improved, however. He started 11th at Bristol Motor Speedway, Tennessee, and ninth at Texas Motor Speedway, his first career top-ten start. However, the poor results led to Foster's unemployment once again.

Foster then had another wild accident to begin his 1999 season. During his brief comeback to the Goody's Dash series in the Discount Auto Parts 200 at Daytona, Foster went on his side after making contact in a three wide situation with Derrick Kelley and Scott Krehling in a big accident that also saw Brent Moore go upside down on the backstretch for several feet. Once again, he emerged from the wreck without injury. That wreck was one of many big accidents in a race won by Christian Elder, in which another massive accident occurred on the tri-oval on lap 11 involving injuries between Scott Weaver and George Crenshaw, but both were overshadowed by the biggest accident of the race with six to go when Danny Bagwell went for a horrific barrel roll in between the exit of turn 4 and the tri-oval in what many call the worst accident in Goody's Dash series history. Bagwell was also okay. Later that year, Foster ran his final career Busch series race, driving for Blaise Alexander's No. 20 at Myrtle Beach Speedway. He started the race in 15th, but once again could not finish the race. He was 34th after overheating and it would prove to be the end of Foster's NASCAR career.

== Motorsports career results ==
=== NASCAR ===
(key) (Bold – Pole position awarded by qualifying time. Italics – Pole position earned by points standings or practice time. * – Most laps led.)

==== Busch Series ====
NASCAR Busch Series results
Year	Team	No.	Make	1	2	3	4	5	6	7	8	9	10	11	12	13	14	15	16	17	18	19	20	21	22	23	24	25	26	27	28	29	30	31	32	NBSC	Pts	Ref
1997	Key Motorsports	11	Ford	DAY; DNQ	CAR; 35	RCH; 41	ATL; 30	LVS; 40	DAR; 31	HCY	TEX; 41	BRI	NSV; 22	TAL; 40	NHA; 16	NZH	CLT; 42	DOV	SBO	GLN	MLW	MYB	GTY	IRP	MCH	BRI	DAR	RCH	DOV	CLT	CAL	CAR	HOM			51st	616	
1998	Washington-Erving Motorsports	50	Ford	DAY; DNQ	CAR; DNQ	LVS; 41	NSV; 25	DAR; DNQ	BRI; 42	TEX; 37	HCY	TAL	NHA	NZH	CLT	DOV	RCH	PPR	GLN	MLW; 39	MYB; DNQ	CAL	SBO	IRP	MCH	BRI	DAR	RCH	DOV	CLT	GTY	CAR	ATL	HOM		69th	263	
1999	Blaise Alexander Racing	20	Chevy	DAY	CAR	LVS	ATL	DAR	TEX	NSV	BRI	TAL	CAL	NHA	RCH	NZH	CLT	DOV	SBO	GLN	MLW	MYB; 34	PPR	GTY	IRP	MCH	BRI	DAR	RCH	DOV	CLT	CAR	MEM	PHO	HOM	122nd	61	
