= Dennis Setzer =

American racing driver (born 1960)

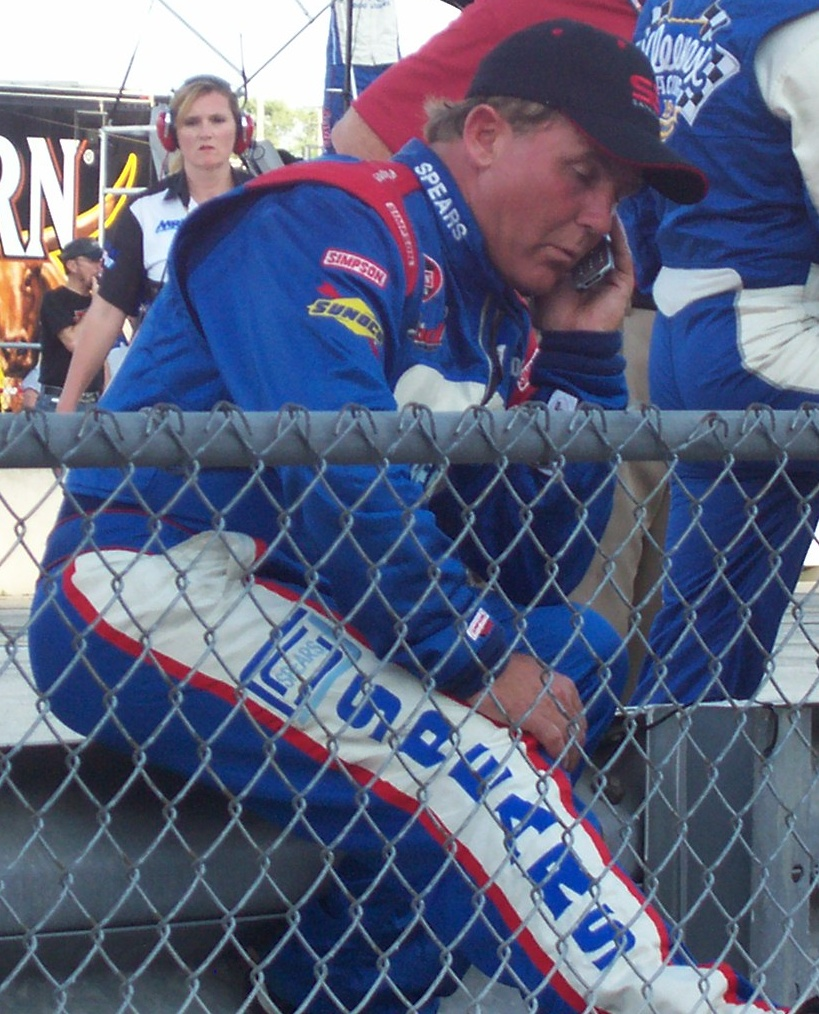
- Setzer at the Milwaukee Mile in 2009
- Born: Dennis Howard Setzer; February 27, 1960 (age 66); Newton, North Carolina, U.S.
- Achievements: 2007 ValleyStar Credit Union 300 winner
- Awards: 1999 Craftsman Truck Series Most Popular Driver

NASCAR Cup Series career
- 8 races run over 2 years
- 2011 position: 76th
- Best finish: 51st (1998)
- First race: 1998 DieHard 500 (Talladega)
- Last race: 2011 Jeff Byrd 500 (Bristol)
Wins	Top tens	Poles
0	0	0

NASCAR O'Reilly Auto Parts Series career
- 159 races run over 11 years
- 2011 position: 28th
- Best finish: 9th (1994)
- First race: 1991 All Pro 300 (Charlotte)
- Last race: 2011 Dollar General 300 (Joliet)
- First win: 1994 Ford Credit 300 (South Boston)
- Last win: 1994 The Pantry 300 (Hickory)
Wins	Top tens	Poles
2	22	1

NASCAR FedEx Freight Truck Series career
- 314 races run over 17 years
- 2012 position: 38th
- Best finish: 2nd (2003, 2004, 2005)
- First race: 1995 Sears Auto Center 125 (Milwaukee)
- Last race: 2012 Lucas Oil 150 (Phoenix)
- First win: 1998 Dodge California Truck Stop 300 (Mesa Marin)
- Last win: 2008 Kroger 250 (Martinsville)
Wins	Top tens	Poles
18	160	4
- Statistics up to date as of November 17, 2012.

Dennis Howard Setzer (born February 27, 1960) is an American former professional stock car racing driver. He has driven in all three of NASCAR's top series, scoring two wins in the Xfinity Series in 1994 and eighteen wins in the Craftsman Truck Series from 1995 to 2012, where he had his greatest success from 2003 to 2005, where he scored nine of his eighteen wins and finished second in the final championship standings three years in a row.

== Beginnings ==
Setzer made his NASCAR debut in the Busch Series in 1991 in the All Pro 300. He started fifth in his own No. 4 Ford Thunderbird, but crashed on lap nine and finished fortieth. He ran another race the following year, at Hickory Motor Speedway in a car owned by Bill Davis. He wrecked in that race as well but still managed to finish 26th. In 1993, he ran four races for Daniel Welch, and had a top-ten run in the Advance Auto Parts 500. He was also a notable competitor in the Sportsman Division.

== Sprint Cup Series ==
Setzer got a job in Bill Elliott's secondary rides, the No. 13 and the No. 89 in 1998. Sponsorship was provided by Elliott's team, which was McDonald's McRib and FirstPlus Financial. In Setzer's eight attempted starts, he posted one DNQ, one DNF and a best finish of nineteenth at Talladega Superspeedway. After a four-year absence, Setzer returned to the Winston Cup Series in 2002. He lined up with Travis Carter, owner of his own ailing team, Haas-Carter Motorsports. Setzer drove his No. 66 Discover Card-sponsored Ford at New Hampshire International Speedway and DNQ'd. That would be his only start of the year. In 2003, he would try again at Martinsville Speedway in Hermie Sadler's No. 02 GoTeamVA.com-sponsored Chevrolet. Setzer failed to qualify for the event. He returned in 2009, driving the Romeo Guest Construction No. 46 Dodge at Martinsville Speedway owned by Carl Long. He failed to qualify once again. In 2010, Setzer formed a relationship with Brian Keselowski of K-Automotive Motorsports, leading him to make a start for him in Cup. He raced at Martinsville Speedway in his No. 92 Dodge but failed to qualify again. In 2011, he expanded his schedule to four races for Keselowski. He broke the spell of failing to qualify when he successfully qualified the No. 92 at Bristol Motor Speedway, and finished 38th. Setzer failed to qualify in his other three 2011 starts, including his last ever attempted race in the Sprint Cup Series at Martinsville Speedway.

== Busch Series ==
Setzer made his first full-time run in 1994, driving the No. 59 Alliance Training Centers-sponsored Chevrolet for Welch once again. Setzer won in his 23rd career start at South Boston Speedway, then won again two races later at Hickory Motor Speedway. By the end of the year, he was ninth in points and was runner-up to Johnny Benson for Rookie of the Year. In 1995, the team switched to Fords; Setzer struggled in the adjustment. After he won the pole at the Milwaukee Mile, he was released from the ride, and spent the rest of the season making fill-in starts. At the same time, he began running part-time in the newly formed Craftsman Truck Series. He finished second in his debut at Milwaukee, along with seven other starts that year.

In 1996, Setzer signed to drive the No. 38 Lipton Tea-sponsored Ford for Akins-Sutton Motorsports. Despite two top-ten finishes, he was released from the ride, and spent he rest of the year driving the Mark III Financial car. He started the 1997 season in that ride, but was released after five races, and spent the rest of the season in the No. 43 Lance Snacks-sponsored Chevy owned by David Ridling, posting four top-tens and finishing nineteenth in points.

== Truck Series ==
After 1997, Setzer did not have a ride for 1998. He started the season doing work for Gloy-Rahal Motorsports in the Trucks, but only for a handful of races. After three DNF's in the Busch Series, Setzer was selected by K Automotive Racing to replace driver/team owner Bob Keselowski, who had been injured in a wreck. Setzer had eighth-place finishes in the truck while filling in. After that, he signed with Bill Elliott Racing, replacing Jerry Nadeau for eight races. His best finish in seven starts (he DNQ'd at Dover) was nineteenth at Talladega Superspeedway. After a brief hiatus from the trucks, Setzer returned to K Automotive to finish the season, and collected a win at Mesa Marin Raceway.

In 1999, K Automotive provided Setzer with a full-time ride in the No. 1 Mopar-sponsored Dodge Ram. Setzer won three races and was in the thick of the championship hunt, but an early wreck at the season finale at California Speedway took him out of the running. Nevertheless, he was named the series' Most Popular Driver for 1999. His performance slipped in 2000, as he won just one race and dropped to seventh in points. After that season, he left the team.

== Recent years ==
In 2001, Setzer joined Morgan-Dollar Motorsports. In his first year with the team he won two poles, one race, and finished ninth in points. After another quiet year in 2002, things started improving, as Setzer won three races in 2003. Setzer went on a tear, finishing a career-best second in the point standings for three seasons in a row (2003, 2004, & 2005). After failing to win a race in 2006, he departed Morgan Dollar to join Spears Motorsports. In 2007, Setzer won the City of Mansfield 250 at Mansfield Motorsports Speedway after running the entire 250 lap race without a pitstop. The Mansfield victory was his first victory in 41 races, his last coming in the Power Stroke Diesel 200 at O'Reilly Raceway Park on August 1, 2005.

Late in the 2007 season, Setzer parted ways with Spears and raced at New Hampshire for Green Light Racing, and at Las Vegas for Bobby Hamilton Racing. He drove the No. 18 Dodge Ram Truck to a victory in the 2008 Kroger 250 at Martinsville. It was Setzer's eighteenth career win, and BHR's first win since Bobby Hamilton Sr. won in Mansfield in 2005. Furthermore, it was the final win for the Dodge nameplate in the Truck Series before they pulled out of NASCAR following 2012. After BHR shut down at the end of 2008, Setzer found himself out of a job entering the season.

Setzer began the 2009 Truck Series season driving one race apiece for GunBroker Racing and Fast Track Racing Enterprises, before being named the driver for MRD Motorsports. He had two second-place finishes and was in the Top 10 in points before he was forced to miss six races due to sponsorship issues. Setzer also returned to K-Automotive Racing in the Nationwide Series, driving the No. 96 ConelyAuto.com-sponsored Dodge on a part-time basis before moving to the other team car, the No. 92.

During the 2010 Aaron's 312 Nationwide Series race in Talladega on the last lap, Setzer, driving the No. 92, was involved in a huge crash which sent him up the wall and into the catch fence. He then hit a fence pole and spun around, and with a fiery explosion, landed on all four wheels. Setzer was okay after the crash.

Setzer did not have a full-time ride to begin 2011. In March, he was named a substitute driver for Brian Keselowski in the Sprint Cup Series, who was recovering from gallbladder surgery. Setzer successfully qualified for the Bristol race, his first Cup series event since 1998. He went on to finish 38th, the team's best finish to date. Brian Keselowski has since returned to action. After several weeks, Setzer began driving the cars for Jay Robinson Racing in the Nationwide Series. Setzer also attempted a handful of races with ML Motorsports and R3 Motorsports. His best finish of the year was eighteenth at Road America. Setzer was to attempt the fall Cup race at Martinsville, but qualifying was rained out and the field was set by owner's points, and Setzer and his K-Automotive Motorsports team went home.

== Motorsports career results ==
=== NASCAR ===
(key) (Bold – Pole position awarded by qualifying time. Italics – Pole position earned by points standings or practice time. * – Most laps led.)

==== Sprint Cup Series ====
NASCAR Sprint Cup Series results
Year	Team	No.	Make	1	2	3	4	5	6	7	8	9	10	11	12	13	14	15	16	17	18	19	20	21	22	23	24	25	26	27	28	29	30	31	32	33	34	35	36	NSCC	Pts	Ref
1998	Elliott-Marino Racing	89	Ford	DAY	CAR	LVS	ATL	DAR	BRI	TEX	MAR	TAL; 19	CAL	CLT																										51st	502	
1998	Elliott-Marino Racing	13	Ford												DOV; DNQ	RCH	MCH	POC	SON	NHA	POC	IND	GLN	MCH; 35	BRI; 39	NHA; 24	DAR; 29	RCH; 29	DOV	MAR; 38	CLT	TAL	DAY	PHO	CAR	ATL				51st	502	
2003	SCORE Motorsports	02	Chevy	DAY	CAR	LVS	ATL	DAR	BRI	TEX	TAL	MAR; QL^{†}	CAL	RCH	CLT	DOV	POC	MCH	SON	DAY	CHI	NHA	POC	IND	GLN	MCH	BRI	DAR	RCH	NHA	DOV	TAL	KAN	CLT	MAR	ATL	PHO	CAR	HOM	NA	-	
2009	Carl Long Racing	46	Dodge	DAY	CAL	LVS	ATL	BRI	MAR; DNQ	TEX	PHO	TAL	RCH	DAR	CLT	DOV	POC	MCH	SON	NHA	DAY	CHI	IND	POC	GLN	MCH	BRI	ATL	RCH	NHA	DOV	KAN	CAL	CLT	MAR	TAL	TEX	PHO	HOM	NA	-	
2011	K-Automotive Motorsports	92	Dodge	DAY	PHO	LVS	BRI; 38	CAL	MAR; Wth	TEX	TAL	RCH	DAR	DOV	CLT	KAN	POC	MCH	SON	DAY	KEN																			76th	0^{1}	
2011	K-Automotive Motorsports	92	Chevy																			NHA; DNQ	IND	POC	GLN	MCH	BRI	ATL	RCH	CHI	NHA	DOV	KAN	CLT	TAL	MAR; DNQ	TEX	PHO	HOM	76th	0^{1}	
^{†} - Qualified for Hermie Sadler

==== Nationwide Series ====
NASCAR Nationwide Series results
Year	Team	No.	Make	1	2	3	4	5	6	7	8	9	10	11	12	13	14	15	16	17	18	19	20	21	22	23	24	25	26	27	28	29	30	31	32	33	34	35	NNSC	Pts	Ref
1991	Dennis Setzer	4	Ford	DAY	RCH	CAR	MAR	VOL	HCY	DAR	BRI	LAN	SBO	NZH	CLT	DOV	ROU	HCY	MYB	GLN	OXF	NHA	SBO	DUB	IRP	ROU	BRI	DAR	RCH	DOV	CLT; 40	NHA	CAR	MAR					110th	43	
1992	Bill Davis Racing	4	Ford	DAY	CAR	RCH	ATL	MAR	DAR	BRI	HCY	LAN	DUB	NZH	CLT	DOV	ROU	MYB	GLN	VOL	NHA	TAL	IRP	ROU	MCH	NHA	BRI	DAR	RCH	DOV	CLT	MAR	CAR	HCY; 26					112th	85	
1993	Shepherd Racing	21	Ford	DAY	CAR	RCH	DAR	BRI	HCY	ROU	MAR	NZH	CLT; 22	DOV	MYB	GLN	MLW	TAL	IRP	MCH	NHA	BRI	DAR	RCH	DOV	ROU	CLT												53rd	458	
1993	Alliance Motorsports	59	Chevy																									MAR; 10	CAR; DNQ	HCY; 11	ATL; 22								53rd	458	
1994	Alliance Motorsports	59	Chevy	DAY; 37	CAR; 9	RCH; 26	ATL; 8	MAR; 24	DAR; 31	HCY; 26	BRI; 17	ROU; 2	NHA; 8	NZH; 9	CLT; 17	DOV; 33	MYB; 14	GLN; 14	MLW; 9	SBO; 1	TAL; 36	HCY; 1*	IRP; 4	MCH; 6	BRI; 21	DAR; 10	RCH; 23	DOV; 12	CLT; 21	MAR; 21	CAR; 17								9th	3273	
1995	Alliance Motorsports	59	Ford	DAY; 24	CAR; 36	RCH; 14	ATL; 20	NSV; 19	DAR; 19	BRI; 24	HCY; 6	NHA; 6	NZH; 35	CLT; 26	DOV; 20	MYB; 3	GLN	**MLW**; 4	TAL																				23rd	2036	
1995	M.P.H. Racing	08	Chevy																	SBO; 31																			23rd	2036	
1995	Team SABCO	42	Pontiac																		IRP; 23	MCH			RCH; 31	DOV	CLT; 22	CAR											23rd	2036	
1995	Group III Racing	18	Ford																				BRI; 25	DAR															23rd	2036	
1995	Moroso Racing	20	Ford																										HOM; 30										23rd	2036	
1996	Akins-Sutton Motorsports	38	Ford	DAY; 27	CAR; 31	RCH; 22	ATL; DNQ	NSV; 37	DAR; 36	BRI; DNQ	HCY; DNQ	NZH; 20	CLT; DNQ	DOV; 33	SBO; 11	MYB; 8	GLN; 11	MLW; 24	NHA; 24	TAL; DNQ	IRP; 6	MCH	BRI																27th	1567	
1996	Porter Racing	48	Ford																					DAR; 40	RCH														27th	1567	
1996	Mark III Racing	77	Chevy																							DOV; 15	CLT; DNQ	CAR; 18	HOM; 41										27th	1567	
1997	South Coast Racing	71	Ford	DAY; DNQ																																			19th	2541	
1997	Mark III Racing	78	Chevy		CAR; 20	RCH	ATL; 31	LVS																															19th	2541	
1997	Ridling Motorsports	43	Chevy						DAR; 23	HCY; 18	TEX; 29	BRI; 23	NSV; 9	TAL; 37	NHA; 11	NZH; 10	CLT; DNQ	DOV; 28	SBO; 12	GLN; 27	MLW; 28	MYB; 20	GTY; 10	IRP; 14	MCH; 37	BRI; 18	DAR; 35	RCH; 27	DOV; 18	CLT; 37	CAL; 8	CAR; 27	HOM; 11						19th	2541	
1998	Phoenix Racing	4	Chevy	DAY	CAR	LVS	NSV	DAR	BRI	TEX	HCY; 31	TAL																											100th	107	
1998	Porter Racing	48	Ford										NHA; 42	NZH	CLT																								100th	107	
1998	Washington-Erving Motorsports	50	Ford													DOV; 41	RCH	PPR	GLN	MLW	MYB	CAL	SBO	IRP	MCH	BRI	DAR	RCH	DOV	CLT	GTY	CAR	ATL	HOM					100th	107	
1999	Jarrett/Favre Motorsports	11	Ford	DAY	CAR	LVS	ATL	DAR	TEX	NSV	BRI	TAL	CAL	NHA	RCH	NZH	CLT	DOV	SBO	GLN	MLW; DNQ	MYB	PPR	GTY	IRP; QL^{†}	MCH	BRI	DAR	RCH	DOV	CLT	CAR	MEM	PHO	HOM				NA	-	
2006	Hendrick Motorsports	5	Chevy	DAY	CAL	MXC	LVS	ATL	BRI	TEX	NSH	PHO	TAL	RCH	DAR	CLT	DOV	NSH	KEN	MLW; QL^{‡}	DAY	CHI	NHA	MAR; QL^{‡}	GTY	IRP	GLN	MCH	BRI	CAL	RCH	DOV	KAN	CLT	MEM	TEX	PHO	HOM	NA	-	
2009	Whitney Motorsports	96	Dodge	DAY	CAL; 42	LVS; 43	BRI; 38	TEX; QL^{±}		PHO; DNQ	TAL	RCH	DAR; DNQ	CLT; 38	DOV; 42	NSH	KEN	MLW; 41	NHA	DAY			IRP; DNQ	IOW	GLN	MCH; 42	BRI; DNQ	CGV	ATL	RCH; 34			CAL; 36						57th	775	
2009	Whitney Motorsports	26	Dodge						NSH; 20												CHI; 30	GTY																	57th	775	
2009	Whitney Motorsports	92	Dodge																												DOV; 38	KAN		CLT; 42	MEM	TEX; 42	PHO; 42	HOM; 41	57th	775	
2010	K-Automotive Motorsports	96	Dodge	DAY; Wth	CAL; 42	LVS; 43	BRI; DNQ																															HOM; 42	49th	797	
2010	K-Automotive Motorsports	92	Dodge					NSH; DNQ	PHO; 43	TEX; 43	TAL; 17	RCH	DAR; 43	DOV; QL^{±}	CLT; 39	NSH; 43	KEN; 43	ROA	NHA; 43	DAY	CHI; 43	GTY; 42	IRP; 43	IOW; 42	GLN	MCH			ATL; 41	RCH	DOV; 42	KAN	CAL; 42	CLT	GTY	TEX; 43	PHO; 42		49th	797	
2010	K-Automotive Motorsports	26	Dodge																								BRI; 42	CGV											49th	797	
2011	Jay Robinson Racing	70	Dodge	DAY	PHO	LVS	BRI	CAL; 36		TAL; 29			DAR; 23	DOV; 28					ROA; 18	DAY; 35		NHA; 32				GLN; 33	CGV												28th	218	
2011	Jay Robinson Racing	49	Chevy						TEX; 38		NSH; 37	RCH; 38					CHI; 35	MCH; 43			KEN; 43																		28th	218	
2011	Jay Robinson Racing	28	Chevy												IOW; 25																								28th	218	
2011	Jay Robinson Racing	70	Chevy													CLT; 32													ATL; 34										28th	218	
2011	Jay Robinson Racing	23	Dodge																				NSH; 34	IRP; 34	IOW														28th	218	
2011	Jay Robinson Racing	23	Chevy																									BRI; 35											28th	218	
2011	Jay Robinson Racing	48	Chevy																											RCH; 39	CHI; 41	DOV	KAN; DNQ	CLT; DNQ	TEX; DNQ	PHO	HOM		28th	218	
^{†} - Qualified for Kenny Irwin Jr. · ^{‡} - Qualified for Kyle Busch . ^{±} - Qualified for Brian Keselowski

==== Camping World Truck Series ====
NASCAR Camping World Truck Series results
Year	Team	No.	Make	1	2	3	4	5	6	7	8	9	10	11	12	13	14	15	16	17	18	19	20	21	22	23	24	25	26	27	NCWTC	Pts	Ref
1995	Grandaddy Racing	30	Dodge	PHO	TUS	SGS	MMR	POR	EVG	I70	LVL	BRI	MLW; 2	CNS; 12	HPT	IRP; 10	FLM; 21	RCH; 34													28th	850	
1995	Redding Motorsports	89	Chevy																MAR; 26	NWS; 16	SON	MMR	PHO; 35								28th	850	
1997	Harry Brix	56	Dodge	WDW	TUS	HOM; 36	PHO	POR	EVG	I70	NHA	TEX	BRI	NZH	MLW	LVL	CNS	HPT	IRP	FLM	NSV	GLN	RCH	MAR	SON	MMR	CAL	PHO	LVS		134th	55	
1998	M-R Motorsports	04	Chevy	WDW; DNQ	HOM; DNQ	PHO	POR	EVG																							27th	1728	
1998	Gloy/Rahal Racing	55	Ford						I70; 31	GLN	TEX; 14	BRI																			27th	1728	
1998	K Automotive Racing	29	Dodge										MLW; 21	NZH; 11	CAL; 25	PPR; 8	IRP; 8	NHA	FLM	NSV	HPT	LVL	RCH	MEM	GTY; 13	MAR; 6	SON; 14	MMR; 1	PHO; 6	LVS; 13	27th	1728	
1999	K Automotive Racing	1	Dodge	HOM; 34	PHO; 5	EVG; 7	MMR; 6	MAR; 15	MEM; 5	PPR; 16	I70; 2	BRI; 5	TEX; 1	PIR; 9	GLN; 22	MLW; 6	NSV; 1	NZH; 7	MCH; 8	NHA; 1	**IRP**; 7*	GTY; 2	HPT; 12	RCH; 3	LVS; 4	LVL; 8	TEX; 3	CAL; 29			3rd	3639	
2000	K Automotive Racing	1	Dodge	DAY; 8	HOM; 32	PHO; 6	MMR; 8	MAR; 4	PIR; 2*	GTY; 16	MEM; 3	PPR; 5	EVG; 6	TEX; 33	KEN; 12	GLN; 7	MLW; 26	NHA; 33	NZH; 1	MCH; 5	IRP; 7	NSV; 2	CIC; 29	RCH; 8	DOV; 9	TEX; 5	CAL; 11				7th	3214	
2001	Morgan-Dollar Motorsports	46	Chevy	DAY; 24	HOM; 17	MMR; 31	MAR; 19	GTY; 9	DAR; 14	PPR; 8	DOV; 13	TEX; 6	MEM; 1	MLW; 11	**KAN**; 3	KEN; 5	NHA; 3	IRP; 8	NSH; 8	CIC; 2	NZH; 15	**RCH**; 3	SBO; 2	TEX; 6	LVS; 10	PHO; 29	CAL; 4				9th	3306	
2002	Morgan-Dollar Motorsports	46	Chevy	DAY; 34	DAR; 11	MAR; 1	GTY; 6	PPR; 7	DOV; 11	TEX; 14	MEM; 5	MLW; 15	KAN; 2	KEN; 2	NHA; 2	MCH; 14	IRP; 13	NSH; 5	RCH; 20	TEX; 10	SBO; 2	LVS; 3	CAL; 8	PHO; 8	HOM; 6						6th	3132	
2003	Morgan-Dollar Motorsports	46	Chevy	DAY; 7	DAR; 28	MMR; 1*	MAR; 1	CLT; 23	DOV; 9	TEX; 5	MEM; 3	MLW; 5	KAN; 3	KEN; 3	GTW; 8	MCH; 8	IRP; 8	NSH; 8	BRI; 5	RCH; 5	NHA; 4	CAL; 3	LVS; 3	SBO; 1*	TEX; 8	MAR; 3*	PHO; 3	HOM; 7			2nd	3828	
2004	Morgan-Dollar Motorsports	46	Chevy	DAY; 6	ATL; 11	MAR; 2	MFD; 2	CLT; 1	DOV; 18	TEX; 1	MEM; 4	MLW; 3	KAN; 25	KEN; 11	GTW; 2	MCH; 10	IRP; 12	NSH; 19	BRI; 16	RCH; 13	NHA; 6	LVS; 7	CAL; 9	TEX; 8	MAR; 2	PHO; 9	DAR; 17	HOM; 10			2nd	3578	
2005	Morgan-Dollar Motorsports	46	Chevy	DAY; 16	CAL; 10	ATL; 4	MAR; 33	GTY; 2	MFD; 7	CLT; 7	DOV; 13	TEX; 3	MCH; 1*	MLW; 1*	KAN; 11	KEN; 1	MEM; 4	IRP; 1*	NSH; 14	BRI; 16	RCH; 34	NHA; 2	LVS; 14	MAR; 19	ATL; 13	TEX; 18	PHO; 5	HOM; 18			2nd	3480	
2006	Morgan-Dollar Motorsports	85	Chevy	DAY; 13	CAL; 10	ATL; 11	MAR; 9	GTY; 23	CLT; 7	MFD; 7	DOV; 20	TEX; 6	MCH; 8	MLW; 7	KAN; 11	KEN; 20	MEM; 10	IRP; 2	NSH; 35	BRI; 14	NHA; 14	LVS; 8	TAL; 11	MAR; 23	ATL; 14	TEX; 32	PHO; 12	HOM; 9			13th	3129	
2007	Spears Motorsports	75	Chevy	DAY; 19	CAL; 19	ATL; 7	MAR; 13	KAN; 26	CLT; 22	MFD; 1	DOV; 19	TEX; 16	MCH; 24	MLW; 19	MEM; 19	KEN; 18	IRP; 13	NSH; 26	BRI; 26	GTW; 19											13th	2851	
2007	Green Light Racing	08	Chevy																		NHA; 30										13th	2851	
2007	Bobby Hamilton Racing	18	Dodge																			LVS; 7	TAL; 5	MAR; 10	ATL; 13	TEX; 15	PHO; 9	HOM; 29			13th	2851	
2008	Bobby Hamilton Racing	18	Dodge	DAY; 10	CAL; 16	ATL; 13	MAR; 1*	KAN; 25	CLT; 7	MFD; 34	DOV; 18	TEX; 11	MCH; 16	MLW; 11	MEM; 12	KEN; 4	IRP; 26	NSH; 18	BRI; 8	**GTW**; 2	NHA; 16	LVS; 16	TAL; 13	MAR; 2	ATL; 19	TEX; 13	PHO; 15	HOM; 5			8th	3197	
2009	GunBroker Racing	21	Dodge	DAY; 18																											18th	2483	
2009	Fast Track Racing Enterprises	48	Chevy		CAL; 26																										18th	2483	
2009	MRD Motorsports	8	Chevy			ATL; 28	MAR; 7	KAN; 15	CLT; 10	DOV; 2	TEX; 17	MCH; 9	MLW; 2	MEM; 15	KEN; 10	IRP; 4	NSH; 8	BRI; 21	CHI; 6	IOW	GTW	NHA; 11	LVS	MAR; 7	TAL; 8	TEX	PHO	HOM			18th	2483	
2010	Team Gill Racing	46	Dodge	DAY; 3	ATL; 29																										26th	1049	
2010	RBR Enterprises	92	Chevy			MAR; DNQ	NSH; 26	KAN	DOV	CLT; 30	TEX	MCH	IOW		IRP; 12	POC	NSH	DAR; 16	BRI; 12	CHI	KEN; 15	NHA; 18	LVS	MAR; 29	TAL	TEX	PHO	HOM			26th	1049	
2010	Team Gill Racing	95	Dodge											GTY; 35																	26th	1049	
2011	RSS Racing	93	Chevy	DAY	PHO	DAR	MAR	NSH	DOV	CLT	KAN	TEX	KEN	IOW	NSH	IRP	POC	MCH	BRI	ATL; 36	CHI; 33	NHA	KEN	LVS	TAL	MAR	TEX				106th	0^{1}	
2011	RSS Racing	27	Chevy																									HOM; DNQ			106th	0^{1}	
2011	RSS Racing	38	Chevy																									HOM; 34			106th	0^{1}	
2012	RSS Racing	38	Chevy	DAY	MAR	CAR	KAN; DNQ	CLT; 34	DOV; 35	TEX			CHI; 33			BRI; 35	ATL; 36	IOW; 36				MAR; DNQ									38th	124	
2012	RSS Racing	93	Chevy								KEN; 35	IOW; 19		POC; 28	MCH; 31					LVS; 31	TAL		TEX; 35	PHO; 32	HOM						38th	124	
2012	RSS Racing	37	Chevy																KEN; 35												38th	124	

^{*} Season still in progress
^{1} Ineligible for series points

=== ARCA SuperCar Series ===
(key) (Bold – Pole position awarded by qualifying time. Italics – Pole position earned by points standings or practice time. * – Most laps led.)

ARCA SuperCar Series results
Year	Team	No.	Make	1	2	3	4	5	6	7	8	9	10	11	12	13	14	15	16	17	18	19	20	21	ASCC	Pts	Ref
1991	R.L. Brown & Associates	4	Ford	DAY	ATL	KIL	TAL	TOL	FRS	POC	MCH	KIL	FRS	DEL	POC	TAL	HPT	MCH	ISF	TOL	DSF	TWS	ATL; 33		145th	-	
1992	R.L. Brown & Associates	4	Ford	DAY	FIF	TWS	TAL	TOL	KIL	POC; 10	MCH	FRS	KIL	NSH	DEL	POC; 12	HPT	FRS	ISF	TOL	DSF	TWS	SLM	ATL; 11	71st	-	

== Images ==
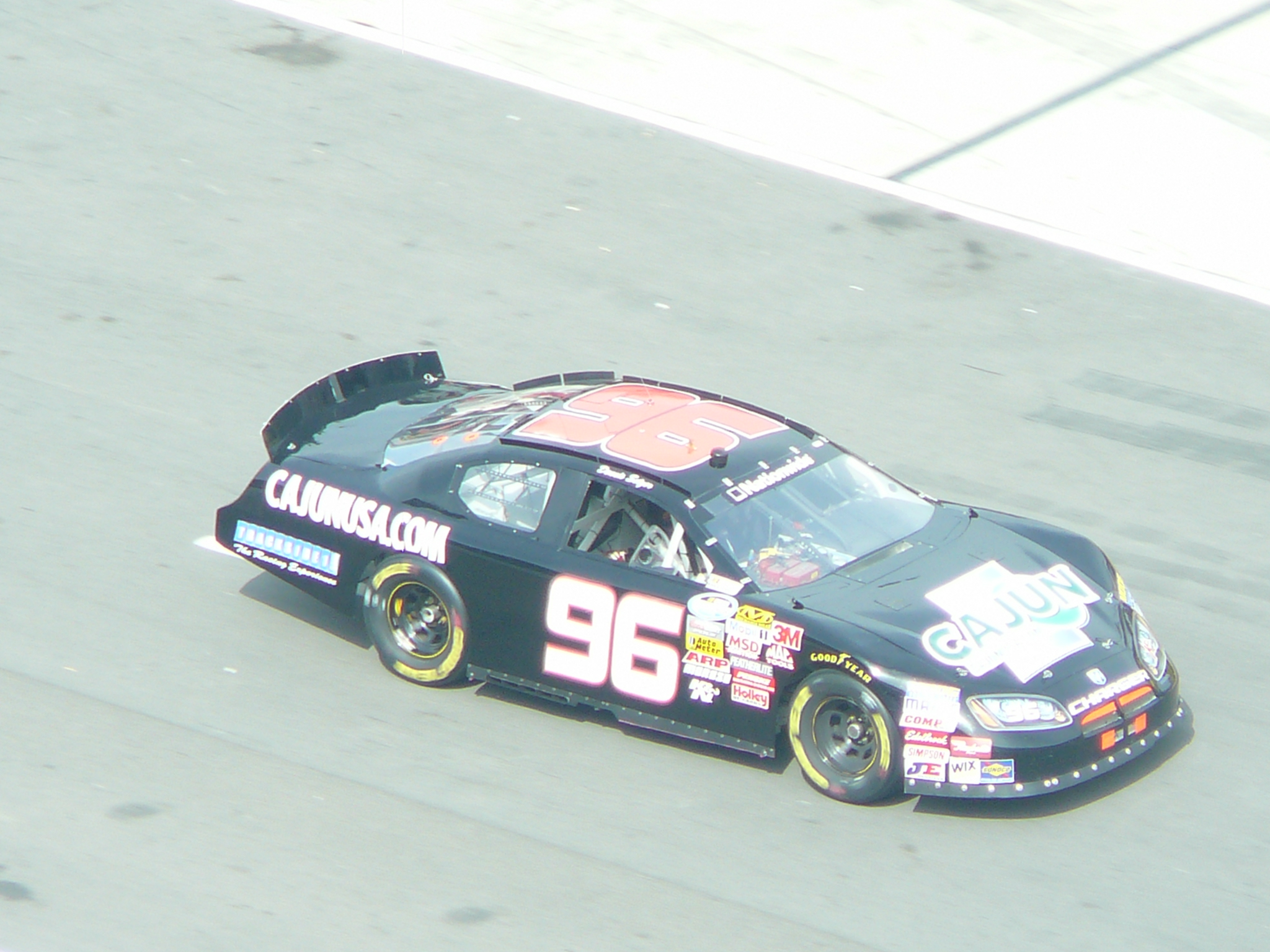
Setzer at Bristol in March 2009 driving the No. 96 Dodge for Bob Keselowski

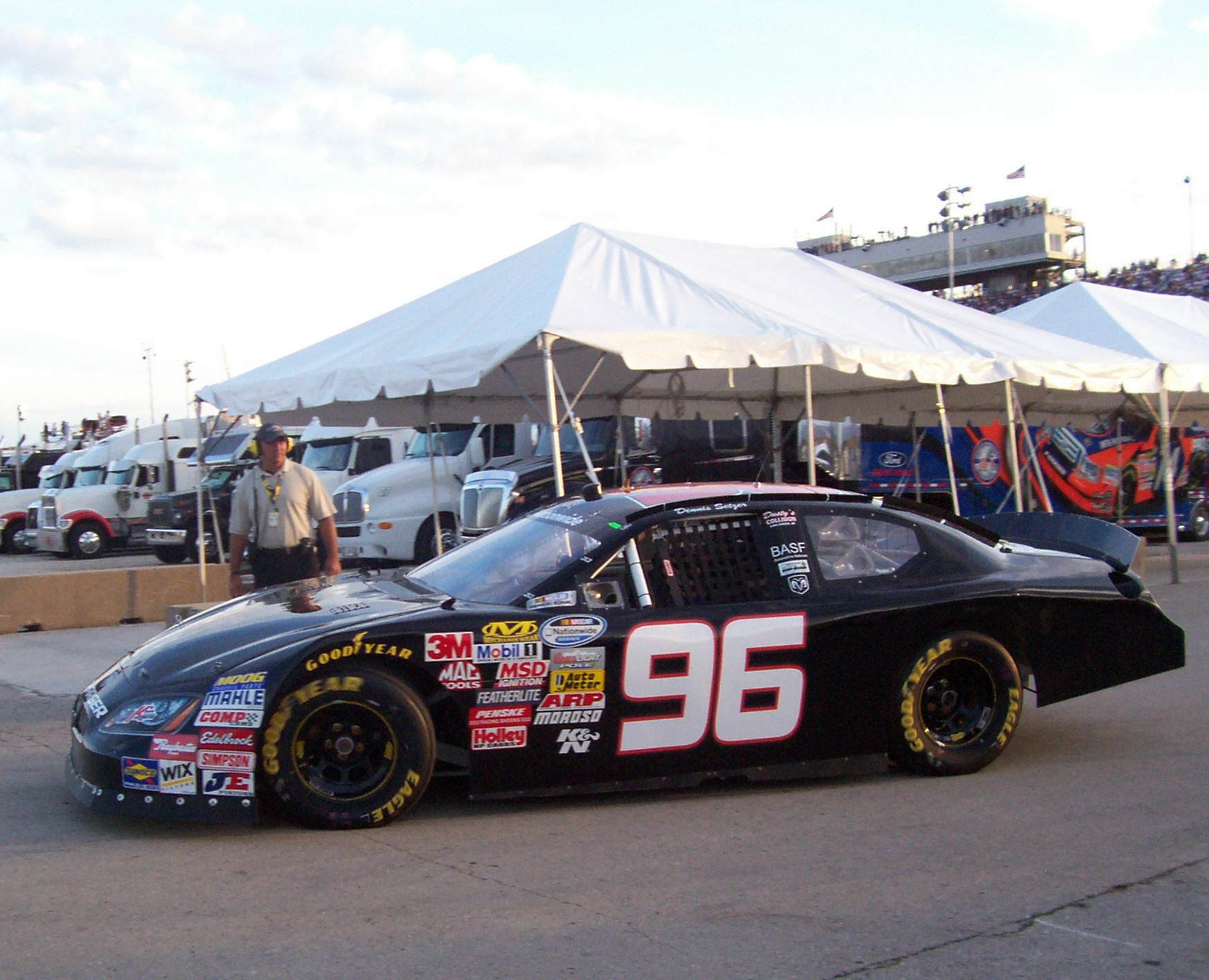
Setzer's No. 96 behind the wall at Milwaukee, 2009

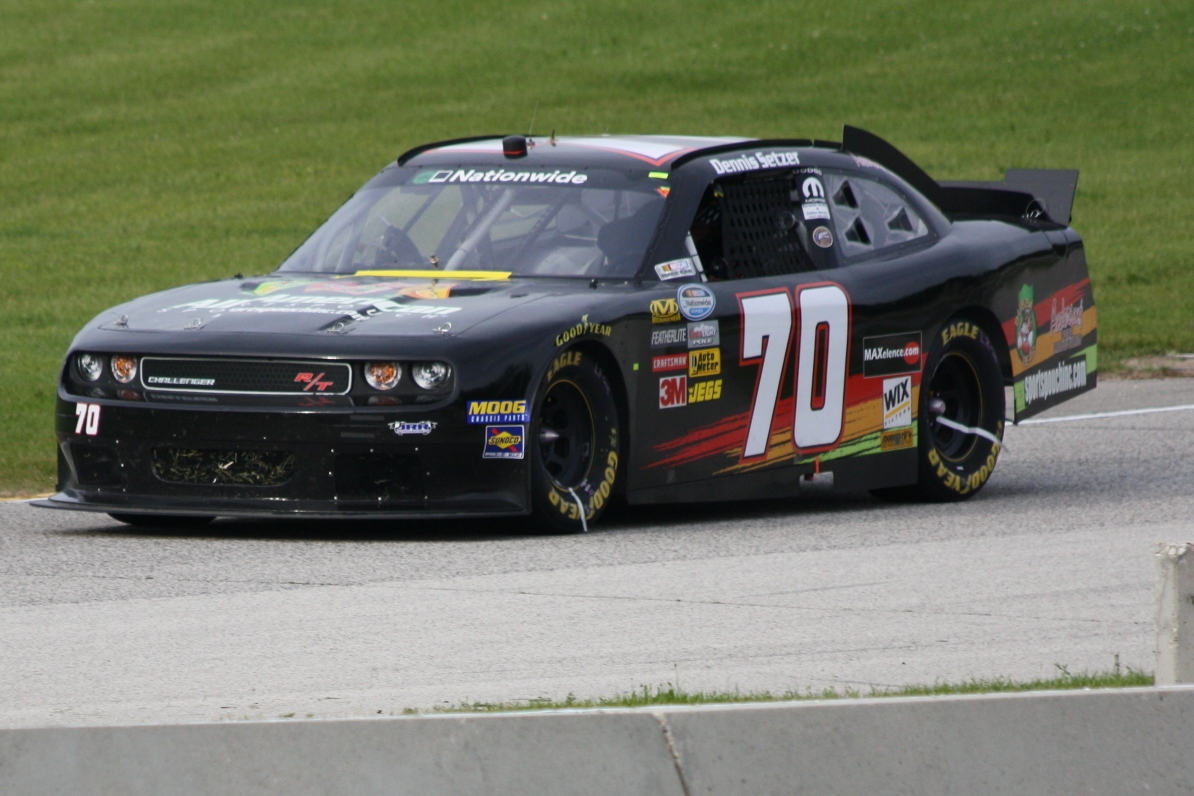
Setzer in the No. 70 Nationwide car at Road America, 2011
