= Washington-Erving Motorsports =

Defunct American stock car racing team

- Owner(s): Julius Erving, Joe Washington
- Base: Lexington, North Carolina
- Series: NASCAR Busch Grand National Series
- Race drivers: Stanton Barrett, Joe Buford, Nathan Buttke, Jimmy Foster, Jeff Green, Mark Green, Andy Houston, Jimmy Kitchens, Dave Rezendes, Tony Roper, Dennis Setzer, Mike Wallace
- Manufacturer: Chevrolet, Ford
- Opened: 1997
- Closed: 2000

Career
- Debut: 1998 Sam's Town Las Vegas 300 (Las Vegas)
- Latest race: 2000 Touchstone Energy 300 (Talladega)
- Races competed: 56
- Drivers' Championships: 0
- Race victories: 0
- Pole positions: 0

Washington-Erving Motorsports is a defunct American stock car racing team. It was owned by former NFL running back Joe Washington and former NBA player Julius Erving. Washington and Erving fielded cars in the NASCAR Busch Series (now Xfinity Series) from 1998 to 2000.

== Founding ==
Washington first piqued his interest in NASCAR by attending the 1997 Daytona 500. He then convinced Erving to come on board, and they formed a team in the summer of 1997. The feelings were split about the new team, which at one time planned to field Winston Cup cars for Rich Bickle. Owner-driver Geoff Bodine was against the team, but others, like Washington's former coach Joe Gibbs and owner-driver Ricky Rudd were in support of the team. The team was only the third fully minority owned team, after Wendell Scott owned his own team and Thee Dixon owned Mansion Motorsports. Before the 1998 season started, the team secured number 50 in honor of that anniversary of Jackie Robinson breaking baseball's color barrier. WEM hired the first female team president in NASCAR, Kathy Thompson.

== Busch Series ==
=== Car No. 50 History ===
In 1998, the team failed to qualify for the first two races of the season with Jimmy Foster. Foster managed to qualify for four of the next five races, plus the Milwaukee race. The team then rotated through nine more drivers. Andy Houston, Dennis Setzer, Jimmy Kitchens, Nathan Buttke, and Joe Buford each made one start. Stanton Barrett made two starts for the team, while Jeff Green and Mike Wallace made three apiece. Dave Rezendes made five starts for the team. The team recorded no wins, top five or top ten finishes during that season.

In 1999, Mark Green drove the entire schedule for the team. He failed to qualify for two races. Green failed to finish seven races, two due to crashes and five due to mechanical mishaps. He recorded one top ten finish, a tenth at Atlanta Motor Speedway. Green and the team parted ways after the 1999 season.

In 2000, the team started out with plans to run the entire season with Tony Roper. However, the team disbanded after Dr Pepper pulled its sponsorship after Roper qualified for only three of the first twelve races.

Due to the amount of DNQs, Roper would quit and later raced for MB Motorsports in the Truck Series, where in October 13th, would crash at Texas Motor Speedway and pass away from his injuries the next day.

==== Car No. 50 History ====
NASCAR Busch Series results
Year	Driver	No.	Make	1	2	3	4	5	6	7	8	9	10	11	12	13	14	15	16	17	18	19	20	21	22	23	24	25	26	27	28	29	30	31	32	Owners	Pts
1998	Jimmy Foster	50	Ford	DAY; DNQ	CAR; DNQ	LVS; 41	NSV; 25	DAR; DNQ	BRI; 42	TEX; 37										MLW; 39	MYB; DNQ															38th	1629
1998	Andy Houston	50	Ford								HCY; 20																									38th	1629
1998	Rick Wilson	50	Ford									TAL; DNQ																								38th	1629
1998	Stanton Barrett	50	Ford										NHA; 34																					HOM; 29		38th	1629
1998	Jeff Green	50	Ford											NZH; 13	CLT; 13		RCH; 28																			38th	1629
1998	Dennis Setzer	50	Ford													DOV; 41																				38th	1629
1998	Jimmy Kitchens	50	Ford															PPR; 32																		38th	1629
1998	Dave Rezendes	50	Ford																GLN; 14				SBO; 30	IRP; 26	MCH; 35	BRI; 12										38th	1629
1998	Mike Wallace	50	Ford																			CAL; 21					DAR; 35			CLT; 20		CAR; DNQ				38th	1629
1998	Casey Atwood	50	Ford																									RCH; DNQ								38th	1629
1998	Nathan Buttke	50	Ford																										DOV; 39							38th	1629
1998	Joe Buford	50	Ford																												GTY; 42					38th	1629
1998	Ken Bouchard	50	Ford																														ATL; DNQ			38th	1629
1999	Mark Green	50	Chevy	DAY; 24	CAR; 23	LVS; 32	ATL; 10	DAR; 33	TEX; 31	NSV; 30	BRI; 17	TAL; 37	CAL; 36	NHA; 27	RCH; 21	NZH; 22	CLT; 16	DOV; 29	SBO; 26	GLN; 37	MLW; 26	MYB; DNQ	PPR; 23	GTY; 32	IRP; 19	MCH; 41	BRI; 42	DAR; 33	RCH; 19	DOV; 22	CLT; 40	CAR; 28	MEM; 17	PHO; 31	HOM; DNQ	25th	2466
2000	Tony Roper	50	Chevy	DAY; DNQ	CAR; 37	LVS; DNQ	ATL; DNQ	DAR; DNQ	BRI; DNQ	TEX; DNQ	NSV; 31	TAL; 24	CAL; DNQ	RCH; DNQ	NHA; DNQ																					59th	370
2000	Stanton Barrett	50	Chevy													CLT; DNQ	DOV	SBO	MYB	GLN	MLW	NZH	PPR	GTY	IRP	MCH	BRI	DAR	RCH	DOV	CLT	CAR	MEM	PHO	HOM	59th	370
