= Nathan Buttke =

American racing driver (born 1975)

- Born: May 8, 1975 (age 51); Randleman, North Carolina, U.S.

NASCAR O'Reilly Auto Parts Series career
- 55 races run over 7 years
- Best finish: 28th (1993)
- First race: 1992 Texas Pete 300 (Rougemont)
- Last race: 1999 Myrtle Beach 250 (Myrtle Beach)
Wins	Top tens	Poles
0	3	0

NASCAR FedEx Freight Truck Series career
- 22 races run over 3 years
- Best finish: 23rd (1996)
- First race: 1996 Western Auto 200 (I-70)
- Last race: 2001 MBNA E-Commerce 200 (Dover)
Wins	Top tens	Poles
0	3	0

Nathan Buttke (born May 8, 1975) is an American former stock car racing driver. The Randleman, North Carolina native competed in 55 NASCAR Busch Series races and 22 NASCAR Craftsman Truck Series races between 1992 and 2001.

== Racing career ==
=== Winston West Series ===
Buttke made one foray into the NASCAR Winston West Series, running one race in 1996 for Spears Motorsports. Running at Mesa Marin Raceway, he qualified fourth and finished in that position.

=== Craftsman Truck Series ===
Spears Motorsports signed Buttke partway through the 1996 season to drive the No. 75 entry. He recorded three top ten finishes, but also crashed out of two races and failed to finish five others with mechanical issues. Buttke did not return to the team in 1997, or even the series, focusing his efforts on the Busch Series. He attempted one race in 1998 for CSG Motorsports, finishing seventeenth at New Hampshire. He returned to the series in 2001, running the first eight races of the season for Ware Racing Enterprises. Buttke and the team mutually parted ways before Texas Motor Speedway in June, with Buttke searching for more opportunities.

=== Busch Series ===
Breaking into the series in 1992, Buttke drove three races for his family team, finishing 23rd at Orange County Speedway, 17th at Martinsville Speedway, and 19th at Hickory Motor Speedway. In 1993, the team expanded its reach to more than half the schedule, and changed its number from 82 to 66. Buttke attempted nineteen races as part of a campaign for Busch Series Rookie of the Year, qualified for seventeen, and recorded his first career top ten, at Hickory. The following year, he ran five races for his family team and three more for Owen Racing, recording a top ten in the No. 9 car at South Boston Speedway, the track at which he ran best, posting an average finish of 17th. Skipping the 1995 season, he ran seven races and failed to qualify for three more in 1996. He failed to finish six out of seven races that year, including the South Boston race, where he qualified second. He also ran the second half of the Craftsman Truck Series schedule that year for Spears Motorsports. In 1997, after acquiring sponsorship from Carquest Auto Parts, he attempted four of the first ten races and made three. He was then signed by Don Browder and the No. 78 Mark III Racing team. Attempting twelve more races, he posted three top ten starts and a best finish of eleventh at Bristol Motor Speedway. His first opportunity in the 1998 season was to race for Phoenix Racing, running races 22 to 24 on the schedule and placing 22nd at Michigan International Speedway, ninth at bristol, and 17th at Darlington Raceway. He then joined Washington-Erving Motorsports for one race, falling out with brake issues at Dover International Speedway. Finally, Buttke returned to the Mark III team for the final four races of the season. His final Busch race came in 1999, competing at Myrtle Beach Speedway for NorthStar Motorsports, finishing 16th.

=== Post-NASCAR ===
Buttke has remained an active racer at Caraway Speedway and in the Goodyear Challenge Series.

== Personal life ==
Buttke attended Randleman High School while racing.

== Motorsports career results ==
=== NASCAR ===
(key) (Bold – Pole position awarded by qualifying time. Italics – Pole position earned by points standings or practice time. * – Most laps led.)

==== Busch Series ====
NASCAR Busch Series results
Year	Team	No.	Make	1	2	3	4	5	6	7	8	9	10	11	12	13	14	15	16	17	18	19	20	21	22	23	24	25	26	27	28	29	30	31	32	NBSC	Pts	Ref
1992	Buttke Racing	82	Olds	DAY	CAR	RCH	ATL	MAR	DAR	BRI	HCY	LAN	DUB	NZH	CLT	DOV	ROU	MYB	GLN	VOL	NHA	TAL	IRP	ROU; 23	MCH	NHA	BRI	DAR	RCH	DOV	CLT	MAR; 17	CAR	HCY; 19		61st	312	
1993	Buttke Racing	66	Chevy	DAY	CAR; 30	RCH; DNQ	DAR; 31	BRI; 29	HCY	ROU; 17	MAR; 26						MLW; 24	TAL	IRP; 31	MCH	NHA; 35	BRI	DAR; 17	RCH; 27	DOV; 31	ROU; 16	CLT; DNQ	MAR; 29	CAR; 24	HCY; 8	ATL					28th	1490	
1993	Buttke Racing	66	Pontiac									NZH; 34	CLT	DOV	MYB; 19	GLN																				28th	1490	
1994	Owen Racing	9	Chevy	DAY; DNQ	CAR	RCH	ATL	MAR; DNQ	DAR	HCY	BRI	ROU; 19	NHA	NZH	CLT	DOV	MYB; 28	GLN		SBO; 8	TAL															49th	716	
1994	Buttke Racing	66	Chevy																MLW; 29			HCY; 18	IRP	MCH	BRI; 34	DAR; 29	RCH	DOV	CLT	MAR	CAR; 32					49th	716	
1996	Buttke Racing	66	Chevy	DAY	CAR; 40	RCH; DNQ	ATL	NSV	DAR; 39	BRI	HCY; 29	NZH	CLT; DNQ	DOV	SBO; 29	MYB; 27	GLN	MLW; 35	NHA; Wth	TAL	IRP; 17	MCH	BRI	DAR	RCH	DOV	CLT	CAR	HOM							54th	493	
1997	Buttke Racing	66	Chevy	DAY	CAR	RCH; DNQ	ATL	LVS	DAR; 20	HCY	TEX	BRI; 25	NSV; 41	TAL	NHA	NZH																				41st	1135	
1997	Mark III Racing	78	Chevy														CLT; DNQ	DOV	SBO; 14	GLN	MLW; 36	MYB; 18	GTY; 33	IRP; 16	MCH; DNQ	BRI; 11	DAR; 21	RCH; 38	DOV	CLT; 38	CAL	CAR; 17	HOM			41st	1135	
1998	Phoenix Racing	4	Chevy	DAY	CAR	LVS	NSV	DAR	BRI	TEX	HCY	TAL	NHA	NZH	CLT	DOV	RCH	PPR	GLN	MLW	MYB	CAL	SBO	IRP	MCH; 22	BRI; 9	DAR; 17	RCH								55th	577	
1998	Washington-Erving Motorsports	50	Ford																										DOV; 39	CLT						55th	577	
1998	Mark III Racing	78	Chevy																												GTY; 23	CAR; 26	ATL; DNQ	HOM; DNQ		55th	577	
1999		30		DAY	CAR	LVS	ATL	DAR	TEX	NSV	BRI	TAL	CAL	NHA	RCH	NZH	CLT; DNQ	DOV	SBO	GLN	MLW															100th	115	
1999	NorthStar Motorsports	89	Chevy																			MYB; 16	PPR	GTY	IRP	MCH	BRI	DAR	RCH	DOV	CLT	CAR	MEM	PHO	HOM	100th	115	

==== Craftsman Truck Series ====
NASCAR Craftsman Truck Series results
Year	Team	No.	Make	1	2	3	4	5	6	7	8	9	10	11	12	13	14	15	16	17	18	19	20	21	22	23	24	25	26	27	NCTC	Pts	Ref
1996	Spears Motorsports	75	Chevy	HOM	PHO	POR	EVG	TUS	CNS	HPT	BRI	NZH	MLW	LVL	I70; 7	IRP; 8	FLM; 19	GLN; 29	NSV; 28	RCH; 6	NHA; 17	MAR; 28	NWS; 21	SON; 27	MMR; 14	PHO; 25	LVS; 33				23rd	1435	
1998	CSG Motorsports	57	Ford	WDW	HOM	PHO	POR	EVG	I70	GLN	TEX	BRI	MLW	NZH	CAL	PPR	IRP	NHA; 17	FLM	NSV	HPT	LVL	RCH	MEM	GTY	MAR	SON	MMR	PHO	LVS	89th	112	
2001	Ware Racing Enterprises	81	Ford	DAY; 31	HOM; 16	MMR; 29	MAR; 23	GTY; 26	DAR; 19	PPR; 17	DOV; 18	TEX	MEM	MLW	KAN	KEN	NHA	IRP	NSH	CIC	NZH	RCH	SBO	TEX	LVS	PHO	CAL				37th	767	

==== Winston West Series ====
NASCAR Winston West Series results
Year	Team	No.	Make	1	2	3	4	5	6	7	8	9	10	11	12	13	14	15	NWWSC	Pts	Ref
1996	Spears Motorsports	75	Chevy	TUS	AMP	MMR	SON	MAD	POR	TUS	EVG	CNS	MAD	MMR	SON	MMR; 4	PHO	LVS	49th	160	
