= Michael Ritch =

American stock car racing driver

- Born: February 24, 1973 (age 53); High Point, North Carolina, U.S.
- Achievements: 1992 Mid-Atlantic Regional Champion; 2007 USAR Hooters Pro Cup Series Southern Division Champion

NASCAR Cup Series career
- 1 race run over 1 year
- Best finish: 61st (1995)
- First race: 1995 MBNA 500 (Dover)
Wins	Top tens	Poles
0	0	0

NASCAR O'Reilly Auto Parts Series career
- 39 races run over 8 years
- Best finish: 33rd (2000)
- First race: 1992 Autolite 200 (Richmond)
- Last race: 2000 Outback Steakhouse 200 (Phoenix)
Wins	Top tens	Poles
0	1	0

NASCAR FedEx Freight Truck Series career
- 7 races run over 2 years
- Best finish: 48th (2002)
- First race: 2001 Florida Dodge Dealers 400 (Homestead)
- Last race: 2002 O'Reilly Auto Parts 200 (Memphis)
Wins	Top tens	Poles
0	0	0
- Statistics up to date as of November 25, 2012.

Michael Ritch (born February 24, 1973) is an American stock car racing driver who competed in 47 races across NASCAR's top three series between 1992 and 2002. He also competed in 165 Rev-Oil Pro Cup Series races between 1998 and 2009, winning 15 races and the 2007 Southern Division Championship. Ritch currently competes on the SMART Modified Tour.

== Early career ==
Ritch began his racing career when he was nine years old when he raced BMX bikes. He would eventually move to late model race cars. At the age of nineteen, he won both the track championship at Ace Speedway in Elon, North Carolina and the regional Mid-Atlantic Championship in 1992, winning fourteen of his 44 starts.

== NASCAR career ==
=== Winston Cup Series ===
Ritch made his only career Winston Cup start at Dover International Speedway in 1995. He would finish 34th in the forty-car field, falling out of the race just before the halfway mark after an engine failure..

=== Busch Series ===
Ritch made sporadic Busch Series starts between 1992 and 1999, often on short tracks in Virginia and The Carolinas. During this time he made eighteen starts with a best finish of ninth coming at Orange County Speedway in 1994.

In 2000, Ritch got an opportunity to run a full schedule, driving the No. 55 Ford for Davis & Weight Motorsports. The season was a disappointment as Ritch failed to qualify eleven times in 32 attempts, had only one lead lap finish, and finished 33rd in the standings. He also finished in the top-twenty only five times that season, with a best finish of thirteenth at Talladega, and also led five laps at Gateway. His best showing that season came at South Boston Speedway when he was fastest in practice and qualified third for the race, but finished 25th after a rear gear problem late in the race. After the season, Ritch was released and never attempted another Busch Series race after that.

=== Craftsman Truck Series ===
After being released from his Busch Series ride, Ritch drove a limited schedule in the Craftsman Truck Series for Ware Racing Enterprises in 2001. He made seven starts for the team in a two-year period, with a best finish of sixteenth coming at Gateway in 2001.

== USAR Pro Cup Series ==
Ritch competed in the USAR Pro Cup Series both before and after his tenure in NASCAR, between 1998 and 2009. In that period he made 165 starts with fifteen wins (including seven in 1998), nine poles, and winning the series' Southern Division Championship in 2007. He followed up his championship campaign with a runner-up finish the year after, before switching teams and only running a partial schedule in 2009. He made his final series start at Concord Speedway on September 5, 2009.

== Motorsports career results ==
=== NASCAR ===
(key) (Bold – Pole position awarded by qualifying time. Italics – Pole position earned by points standings or practice time. * – Most laps led.)

==== Winston Cup Series ====
NASCAR Winston Cup Series results
Year	Team	No.	Make	1	2	3	4	5	6	7	8	9	10	11	12	13	14	15	16	17	18	19	20	21	22	23	24	25	26	27	28	29	30	31	NWCC	Pts	Ref
1995	Active Motorsports	32	Chevy	DAY	CAR	RCH	ATL	DAR	BRI	NWS	MAR	TAL	SON	CLT	DOV	POC	MCH	DAY	NHA	POC	TAL	IND	sGLN	MCH	BRI	DAR	RCH	DOV; 34	MAR	NWS	CLT	CAR	PHO	ATL	117th	61	

==== Busch Series ====
NASCAR Busch Series results
Year	Team	No.	Make	1	2	3	4	5	6	7	8	9	10	11	12	13	14	15	16	17	18	19	20	21	22	23	24	25	26	27	28	29	30	31	32	NBSC	Pts	Ref
1992	John Ritch	02	Olds	DAY	CAR	RCH	ATL	MAR	DAR	BRI	HCY	LAN	DUB	NZH	CLT	DOV	ROU	MYB	GLN	VOL	NHA	TAL	IRP	ROU	MCH	NHA	BRI	DAR	RCH; 33	DOV	CLT	MAR; 18	CAR; 30	HCY		70th	246	
1993	John Ritch	02	Olds	DAY	CAR; 17	RCH; 21	DAR	BRI	HCY	ROU	MAR; 18	NZH	CLT	DOV	MYB	GLN	MLW	TAL	IRP	MCH	NHA	BRI	DAR	RCH; 30	DOV	ROU	CLT	MAR								51st	479	
1993	John Ritch	02	Chevy																										CAR; 25	HCY	ATL					51st	479	
1994	John Ritch	02	Chevy	DAY	CAR	RCH	ATL	MAR; 11	DAR	HCY	BRI																RCH; 20	DOV	CLT							55th	438	
1994	John Ritch	02	Olds									ROU; 9	NHA	NZH	CLT	DOV	MYB	GLN	MLW	SBO	TAL	HCY	IRP	MCH	BRI	DAR				MAR; 32	CAR					55th	438	
1995	Ritch Racing	2	Chevy	DAY	CAR	RCH	ATL	NSH	DAR	BRI	HCY	NHA	NZH	CLT	DOV	MYB	GLN	MLW	TAL	SBO	IRP	MCH	BRI	DAR	RCH; 27	DOV	CLT	CAR	HOM							95th	82	
1996	Ken Wilson	02	Chevy	DAY; DNQ	CAR; QL^{†}	RCH	ATL; QL^{‡}	NSV	DAR; DNQ	BRI	HCY	NZH	CLT	DOV	SBO	MYB	GLN	MLW	NHA	TAL	IRP	MCH	BRI	DAR				CAR; DNQ	HOM; 39							79th	116	
1996	Ken Wilson	02	Pontiac																						RCH; 31	DOV	CLT									79th	116	
1997	John Ritch	58	Chevy	DAY	CAR	RCH	ATL	LVS	DAR	HCY	TEX	BRI	NSV	TAL	NHA	NZH	CLT; DNQ	DOV	SBO	GLN	MLW	MYB	GTY	IRP	MCH	BRI	DAR	RCH; 41	DOV	CLT	CAL	CAR	HOM; DNQ			117th	40	
1998	John Ritch	58	Chevy	DAY	CAR; DNQ	LVS	NSV	DAR	BRI	TEX	HCY	TAL	NHA	NZH	CLT	DOV	RCH	PPR	GLN	MLW	MYB	CAL	SBO	IRP	MCH	BRI	DAR	RCH	DOV	CLT	GTY	CAR	ATL	HOM		N/A	0	
1999	Davis & Weight Motorsports	55	Pontiac	DAY	CAR	LVS	ATL	DAR	TEX	NSV	BRI	TAL	CAL	NHA	RCH	NZH	CLT	DOV	SBO	GLN	MLW	MYB	PPR	GTY	IRP	MCH	BRI	DAR	RCH; DNQ	DOV; DNQ	CLT	CAR; 35	MEM; 37	PHO	HOM	104th	110	
2000	Davis & Weight Motorsports	55	Ford	DAY; DNQ	CAR; 16	LVS; 39	ATL; DNQ	DAR; 39	BRI; DNQ	TEX; DNQ	NSV; 39	TAL; 13	CAL; DNQ	RCH; 42	NHA; 22	CLT; DNQ	DOV; 15	SBO; 25	MYB; 24	GLN; DNQ	MLW; 16	NZH; 43	PPR; 32	GTY; 22	IRP; 20	MCH; DNQ	BRI; 25	DAR; 42	RCH; DNQ	DOV; 23	CLT; DNQ	CAR; 21	MEM; 42	PHO; 35	HOM; DNQ	33rd	1643	
^{†} - Qualified but replaced by Rodney Combs. ^{‡} - Qualified but replaced by Jeff Fuller.

==== Craftsman Truck Series ====
NASCAR Craftsman Truck Series results
Year	Team	No.	Make	1	2	3	4	5	6	7	8	9	10	11	12	13	14	15	16	17	18	19	20	21	22	23	24	NCTC	Pts	Ref
2001	Ware Racing Enterprises	51	Chevy	DAY	HOM; 33	MMR	MAR	GTY; 16	DAR	PPR	DOV	TEX	MEM	MLW	KAN	KEN	NHA	IRP	NSH	CIC	NZH	RCH						64th	269	
2001	Ware Racing Enterprises	91	Chevy																				SBO; 26	TEX	LVS	PHO	CAL	64th	269	
2002	Ware Racing Enterprises	51	Dodge	DAY	DAR	MAR	GTY	PPR; 17	DOV; 17	TEX; 24																		48th	370	
2002	Ware Racing Enterprises	81	Dodge								MEM; 36	MLW	KAN	KEN	NHA	MCH	IRP	NSH	RCH	TEX	SBO	LVS	CAL	PHO	HOM			48th	370	

=== CARS Super Late Model Tour ===
(key)

CARS Super Late Model Tour results
Year	Team	No.	Make	1	2	3	4	5	6	7	8	CSLMTC	Pts	Ref
2020	FR Motorsports	11	Ford	SNM	HCY	JEN	HCY; 13	FCS	BRI	FLC; 11	NSH	16th	43	
2021	Todd Fuquay	11	Ford	HCY; 8	GPS	NSH	JEN	HCY; 8	MMS; 9	TCM	SBO	8th	74	

=== SMART Modified Tour ===
SMART Modified Tour results
Year	Car owner	No.	Make	1	2	3	4	5	6	7	8	9	10	11	12	13	14	SMTC	Pts	Ref
2022	N/A	17	N/A	FLO	SNM	CRW	SBO	FCS	CRW; 26	NWS	NWS	CAR	DOM	HCY; 24	TRI	PUL; 11		35th	32	
2023	N/A	11	N/A	FLO; 19	CRW	SBO; 7	HCY; 16	FCS	CRW	ACE; 23	CAR	PUL; 20	TRI	SBO	ROU			24th	123	
2024	N/A	11	N/A	FLO	CRW	SBO	TRI	ROU	HCY	FCS	CRW; 5	JAC	CAR	CRW; 14	DOM	SBO; 28	NWS	30th	76	
