= Shane Hall =

American stock car racing driver

- Born: Robert Shane Hall; August 25, 1969 (age 57); Simpsonville, South Carolina, U.S.

NASCAR Cup Series career
- 1 race run over 1 year
- Best finish: 65th (1995)
- First race: 1995 AC Delco 400 (Rockingham)
Wins	Top tens	Poles
0	0	0

NASCAR O'Reilly Auto Parts Series career
- 190 races run over 13 years
- Best finish: 19th (1998)
- First race: 1995 Opryland USA 320 (Nashville)
- Last race: 2008 Federated Auto Parts 300 (Nashville)
Wins	Top tens	Poles
0	6	2
- Statistics up to date as of June 4, 2012.

Shane Hall (born August 25, 1969) is an American former professional stock car racing driver. He is a former driver in the NASCAR O'Reilly Auto Parts Series. He last drove the No. 49 Chevrolet for Jay Robinson Racing. Hall is featured as an unlockable driver in the 2002 video game NASCAR Thunder 2003, and the 2001 game NASCAR Thunder 2002.

== Racing career ==
=== Nextel Cup Series ===
Hall has one career Cup Series Start. Driving the No. 40 Kendall Oil Pontiac for Dick Brooks at the fall Rockingham race in 1995, he started last. With a crash about two-thirds through the race, Hall backed the No. 40 into the wall, and finished 36th.

=== Busch Series ===
Hall made his Busch debut in 1995 driving for Stegell Motorsports. Driving the No. 85 Lube America Chevy, Hall qualified 38th at Nashville Speedway USA and finished 26th, nine laps down. He made another start that year in Rockingham, finishing 22nd.

The Stegall team decided to run part-time in 1996, competing in 14 of the 26 races. His best run was once again at Rockingham, where he had a twelfth-place finish and garnered his first career lead-lap finish. Hall gained his first-career top-ten start when he qualified ninth at Bristol, matching it two races later Nazareth.

Hall and Stegall ran full-time 1997. Despite not making two races, Hall earned his first career top-ten with a tenth-place finish at Watkins Glen International, while also winning his first career pole at South Boston.

In 1998, Hall scored three top-tens and a pole at Gateway.

For 1999, Hall switched over to the No. 43 team Owned by Mike Curb, but struggled severely, as he did not qualify for six of the 31 races. Despite that, Hall scored his first-career top-five at Myrtle Beach with a fourth-place effort. Yet once again, Hall struggled with nine DNFs. He was released at the end of the year.

Hall only made two starts in 2000, running for the newly formed No. 0 Alumni Motorsports Chevy, with Ohio State University as the sponsor. With no owners' points, he struggled to qualify for many races, and was released.

Hall rebounded in 2001, signing with the No. 63 Hensley Racing Ford, sponsored by Lance Snacks. Hall continued to struggle and managed only three top-twenty finishes, the best of which was twelfth at Daytona International Speedway.

After Ken Alexander bought the No. 63 team in 2002, Hall continued to drive the car, competing in 24 races. He managed a tenth-place finish at Kentucky and had five other top-twenties. Hall was released from the ride at the end of the year.

Hall made five races in 2003, four of which were for Jay Robinson Racing, though with three different numbers. He drove the No. 39 at Nashville, with a 39th-place finish, and the No. 89 at Nazareth, finishing last. Next, driving the No. 49, Hall finished 39th at the June Nashville Race and 28th at Kentucky. In addition, he drove the No. 15 ppc Racing Ford at Memphis, finishing 31st.

Hall made nine more starts in 2004. He ran at Gateway with Moy Racing in the No. 77 BG Products Ford, finishing 31st. He ran two more races for JRR in the No. 28 Team, finishing 41st at IRP and 38th at Dover. The other races were for ORTEC Racing, finishing 19th at Daytona and 20th at Pikes Peak.

Hall ran seven races with JRR in the No. 28 car in 2005, with a best finish of 33rd at Dover. However, he failed to finish any races, and was released. In 2006, he ran part-time with JRR's No. 28, contesting nine races, while failing to qualify for seven. After taking a year off in 2007, Hall returned to the then-renamed Nationwide Series in 2008 for one race at Nashville, driving the No. 49 for JRR.

== Motorsports career results ==
=== NASCAR ===
(key) (Bold – Pole position awarded by qualifying time. Italics – Pole position earned by points standings or practice time. * – Most laps led.)

==== Winston Cup Series ====
NASCAR Winston Cup Series results
Year	Team	No.	Make	1	2	3	4	5	6	7	8	9	10	11	12	13	14	15	16	17	18	19	20	21	22	23	24	25	26	27	28	29	30	31	NWCC	Pts	Ref
1995	Dick Brooks Racing	40	Pontiac	DAY	CAR	RCH	ATL	DAR	BRI	NWS	MAR	TAL	SON	CLT	DOV	POC	MCH	DAY	NHA	POC	TAL	IND	GLN	MCH	BRI	DAR	RCH; DNQ	DOV	MAR	NWS	CLT	CAR; 36	PHO; DNQ	ATL; DNQ	65th	55	

==== Nationwide Series ====
NASCAR Nationwide Series results
Year	Team	No.	Make	1	2	3	4	5	6	7	8	9	10	11	12	13	14	15	16	17	18	19	20	21	22	23	24	25	26	27	28	29	30	31	32	33	34	35	NNSC	Pts	Ref
1995	Stegall Motorsports	85	Chevy	DAY	CAR	RCH	ATL	NSV; 26	DAR	BRI	HCY	NHA	NZH	CLT	DOV	MYB	GLN	MLW	TAL	SBO	IRP	MCH	BRI	DAR	RCH	DOV	CLT; DNQ	CAR; 22	HOM; DNQ										75th	182	
1996	Stegall Motorsports	85	Chevy	DAY	CAR; 12	RCH; 15	ATL; DNQ	NSV; DNQ	DAR; 31	BRI; 35	HCY; DNQ	NZH; 38	CLT; DNQ	DOV	SBO; 18	MYB; 29	GLN	MLW; 14	NHA; 29	TAL	IRP	MCH	BRI; 16	DAR	RCH; DNQ	DOV; 34	CLT; 39	CAR; 30	HOM; 29										42nd	1175	
1997	Stegall Motorsports	85	Chevy	DAY; 38	CAR; 38	RCH; 42	ATL; 38	LVS; 14	DAR; 40	HCY; 23	TEX; 22	BRI; 24	NSV; 24	TAL; 22	NHA; 24	NZH; 30	CLT; 32	DOV; 31	**SBO**; 28	GLN; 10	MLW; 24	MYB; 21	GTY; 18	IRP; 35	MCH; 33	BRI; 38	DAR; 26	RCH; 17	DOV; 19	CLT; DNQ	CAL; 36	CAR; 13	HOM; DNQ						23rd	2285	
1998	Stegall Motorsports	85	Chevy	DAY; 29	CAR; 27	LVS; 43	NSV; 27	DAR; 18	BRI; 19	TEX; 30	HCY; 9	TAL; 12	NHA; 14	NZH; 20	CLT; 32	DOV; 29	RCH; 24	PPR; 25	GLN; 23	MLW; 33	MYB; 26	CAL; 29	SBO; 8	IRP; 37	MCH; 41	BRI; 30	DAR; 39	RCH; 16	DOV; 14	CLT; 27	**GTY**; 8	CAR; 33	ATL; 28	HOM; 21					19th	2763	
1999	Curb/Agajanian Motorsports	43	Chevy	DAY; DNQ	CAR; 18	LVS; DNQ	ATL; DNQ	DAR; 20	TEX; DNQ	NSV; DNQ	BRI; 37	TAL; 27	CAL; DNQ	NHA; 38	RCH; 31	NZH; 23	CLT; 37	DOV; 35	SBO; DNQ	GLN; 24	MLW; 22	MYB; 4	PPR; 38	GTY; 17	IRP; 11	MCH; 21	BRI; 16	DAR; 37	RCH; 25	DOV; 14	CLT; 24	CAR; 36	MEM; 25	PHO; 25	HOM; 40				24th	2154	
2000	Alumni Motorsports	0	Chevy	DAY; DNQ	CAR; DNQ	LVS; DNQ	ATL; 31	DAR; DNQ	BRI; DNQ	TEX	NSV	TAL	CAL	RCH	NHA	CLT	DOV	SBO																					90th	116	
2000	ppc Racing	32	Chevy																MYB; 39	GLN	MLW	NZH	PPR	GTY	IRP	MCH	BRI	DAR	RCH	DOV	CLT	CAR	MEM	PHO	HOM				90th	116	
2001	Hensley Motorsports	63	Ford	DAY; 12	CAR; 25	LVS; 29	ATL; 28	DAR; 23	BRI; 36	TEX; 38	NSH; 30	TAL; 34	CAL; 33	RCH; 30	NHA; 24	NZH; 21	CLT; 41	DOV; 27	KEN; 22	MLW; 24	GLN; 26	CHI; 31	GTY; 22	PPR; 31	IRP; 24	MCH; 35	BRI; 25	DAR; 28	RCH; 26	DOV; 29	KAN; 29	CLT; 34	MEM; 19	PHO; 19	CAR; 34	HOM; 31			23rd	2624	
2002	Hensley Motorsports	63	Chevy	DAY; 32	CAR	LVS			TEX; 40	NSH; 14	TAL; 31	CAL; 27	RCH; 36	NHA; 16	NZH; 29	CLT; 24	DOV; 29	NSH; 30	KEN; 10	MLW; 35	DAY; 31	CHI; 29	GTY; 33	PPR; 15	IRP; 20	MCH; 41	BRI; 26	DAR; 16	RCH; 29	DOV	KAN	CLT	MEM	ATL	CAR	PHO; 23	HOM; 33		29th	1971	
2002	Weber Racing	84	Chevy				DAR; DNQ	BRI																															29th	1971	
2003	Jay Robinson Racing	39	Ford	DAY	CAR	LVS	DAR	BRI	TEX	TAL	NSH; 38	CAL	RCH	GTY																									85th	254	
2003	Jay Robinson Racing	89	Ford												NZH; 43	CLT	DOV																						85th	254	
2003	Jay Robinson Racing	49	Ford															NSH; 39	KEN; 28	MLW	DAY	CHI	NHA	PPR	IRP	MCH	BRI	DAR	RCH	DOV	KAN								85th	254	
2003	ppc Racing	15	Ford																													CLT; DNQ	MEM; 31	ATL	PHO	CAR	HOM		85th	254	
2004	Moy Racing	77	Ford	DAY	CAR	LVS	DAR	BRI	TEX	NSH	TAL	CAL	GTY; 31	RCH	NZH																								54th	618	
2004	Ortec Racing	96	Pontiac													CLT; 40	DOV																						54th	618	
2004	Ortec Racing	96	Chevy															NSH; 25	KEN	MLW	DAY; 19	CHI	NHA	PPR; 20				CAL; 34	RCH							DAR; 35	HOM		54th	618	
2004	Jay Robinson Racing	28	Ford																						IRP; 41	MCH	BRI			DOV; 38	KAN; DNQ	CLT	MEM; DNQ	ATL	PHO				54th	618	
2005	Means Motorsports	52	Ford	DAY; DNQ	CAL; DNQ	MXC	LVS; DNQ	ATL	NSH	BRI	TEX	PHO	TAL	DAR	RCH	CLT	DOV	NSH	KEN	MLW	DAY	CHI	NHA																83rd	283	
2005	Jay Robinson Racing	28	Ford																					PPR; 43	GTY; 42	IRP; 43	GLN	MCH	BRI	CAL	RCH; 41	DOV; 33	KAN	CLT	MEM; 43	TEX	PHO; 41	HOM	83rd	283	
2006	Jay Robinson Racing	28	Ford	DAY	CAL	MXC	LVS	ATL	BRI; DNQ	TEX	NSH; 41	PHO	TAL		DAR; DNQ	CLT	DOV		KEN; 38	MLW																			70th	422	
2006	Jay Robinson Racing	49	Ford											RCH; DNQ				NSH; 37			DAY; 43	CHI		MAR; 43	GTY; DNQ	IRP; 37	GLN	MCH			RCH; DNQ	DOV; 35	KAN	CLT	MEM; DNQ	TEX	PHO; DNQ	HOM	70th	422	
2006	Jay Robinson Racing	28	Chevy																				NHA; 40						BRI; 36	CAL									70th	422	
2008	Jay Robinson Racing	49	Chevy	DAY	CAL	LVS	ATL	BRI	NSH	TEX	PHO	MXC	TAL	RCH	DAR	CLT	DOV	NSH; 43	KEN	MLW	NHA	DAY	CHI	GTY	IRP	CGV	GLN	MCH	BRI	CAL	RCH	DOV	KAN	CLT	MEM	TEX	PHO	HOM	149th	34	
