= Rodney Childers =

NASCAR crew chief

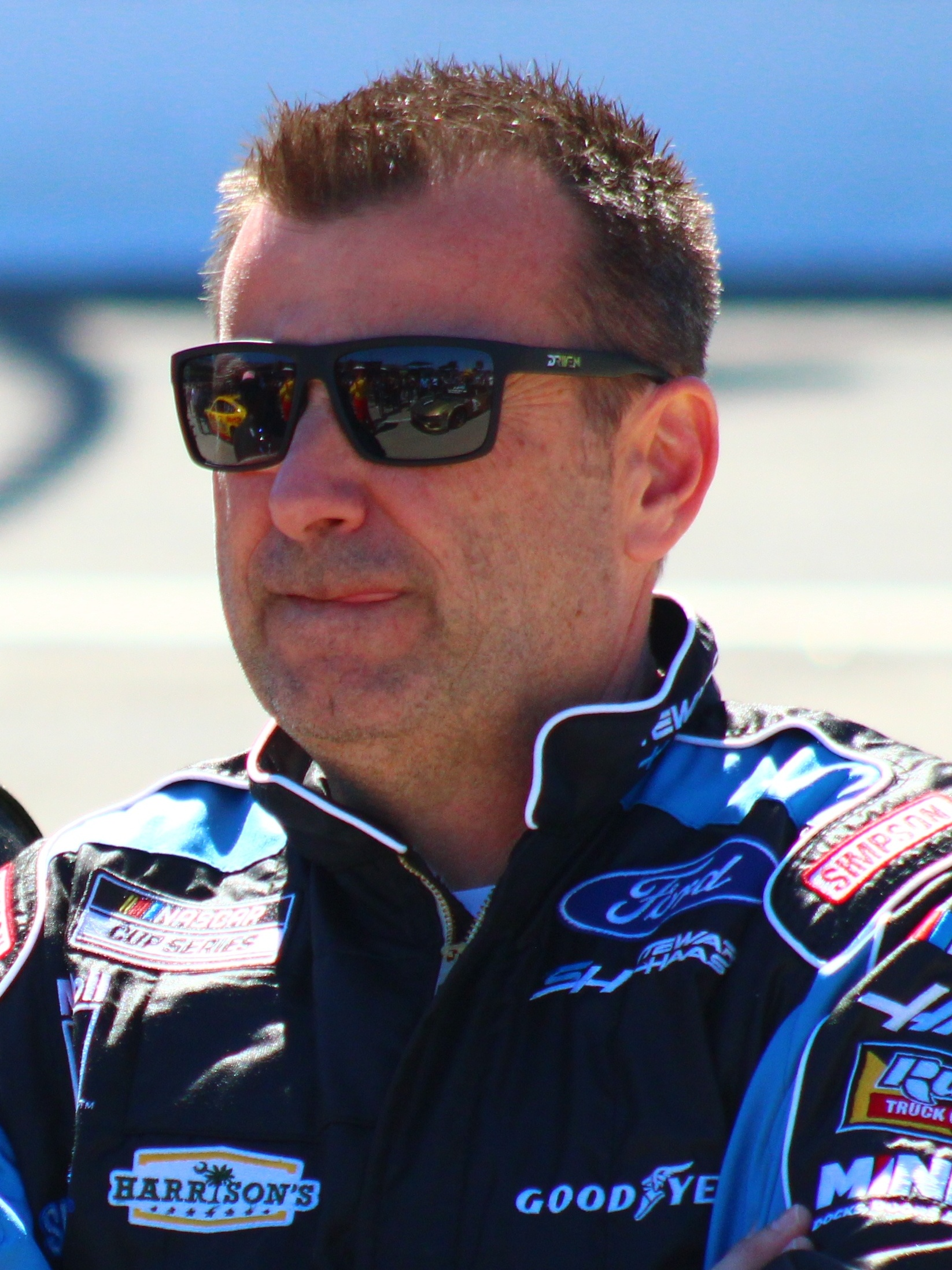
- Childers at Martinsville Speedway in 2024
- Born: Rodney Scott Childers; June 7, 1976 (age 50); Mooresville, North Carolina, U.S.
- Achievements: 2014 NASCAR Sprint Cup Series champion crew chief

NASCAR O'Reilly Auto Parts Series career
- 1 race run over 1 year
- Best finish: 119th (2000)
- First race: 2000 Myrtle Beach 250 (Myrtle Beach)
| Wins | Top tens | Poles |
|---|---|---|
| 0 | 0 | 0 |
- Statistics up to date as of December 23, 2023.

Rodney Scott Childers (born June 7, 1976) is an American professional stock car racing crew chief and former driver. He currently works for JR Motorsports with their No. 1 Chevrolet Camaro SS beginning in the NASCAR O'Reilly Auto Parts Series. He previously worked for Spire Motorsports as the crew chief for their No. 7 Chevrolet Camaro ZL1 in the NASCAR Cup Series driven by Justin Haley. He most notably worked for Stewart–Haas Racing as the crew chief of their No. 4 Ford Mustang in the NASCAR Cup Series driven by Kevin Harvick. Harvick and Childers won the 2014 NASCAR Sprint Cup Series championship together.

== Racing career ==
Rodney Childers was born in Mooresville, North Carolina. Before becoming crew chief, Childers himself was a racer, competing in the World Karting Association when he was twelve years old. He won seven championships in the state of South Carolina and five championships at the national level before moving to the Late Model Stock Car division in 1997. From 1999 to 2002, he competed in the NASCAR Slim Jim All Pro Series and the Hooters Pro Cup Series. In 2000, Childers made his Busch Series debut at Myrtle Beach Speedway, driving the No. 49 Chevrolet Monte Carlo for Jay Robinson Racing.

Childers retired from driving in 2003 to concentrate on becoming a mechanic. He first worked with Penske-Jasper Racing as a mechanic for the No. 77 Dodge, before becoming car chief. In June 2005, Childers was named Scott Riggs' crew chief at MB2/MBV Motorsports for the rest of the season, where Riggs scored two top-fives and four top-ten finishes. He moved with Riggs to Evernham Motorsports at the start of the 2006 season, and stayed with him until October 2007, when he became Elliott Sadler's crew chief at Evernham. He stayed with Sadler until the end of 2008, when he moved to Michael Waltrip Racing.

Childers used to own a 1967 Shelby Mustang GT500. It was given to him by MWR co-owner Robert "Rob" Kauffman after he and driver David Reutimann won the 2009 Coca-Cola 600. Reutimann also received a Mustang from Kauffman. Childers repeated the talents they used to win the Coca-Cola 600 to win Reutimann an upset Cup victory at Chicago. After Reutimann went winless in 2011, he was replaced by Mark Martin and one of Childers' lifelong friends, Brian Vickers. Childers and the team was renumbered to 55. Vickers won the No. 55 team a victory at Loudon.

On August 23, 2013, despite the Loudon win, Childers announced that he was leaving MWR to become Kevin Harvick's crew chief at Stewart–Haas Racing in 2014. Childers was released from his crew chief duties by MWR following the 2013 Irwin Tools Night Race, but remained under contract for the remainder of the season.

Harvick and Childers combined to win the 2014 NASCAR Sprint Cup Series title. Since the title reign, the duo have been consistent in finishing within the NASCAR playoffs. The two have combined to win 36 points races, 25 poles and one All-Star race win since the start of the No. 4 team.

On October 5, 2022, Childers was suspended for four races and fined US$100,000 for an L2 Penalty during post-race inspection after the Talladega playoff race. The penalty came under Sections 14.1 (vehicle assembly) and 14.5 (body) in the NASCAR Rule Book, both of which pertain to the body and overall vehicle assembly rules surrounding modification of a single-source supplied part. In addition, the No. 4 team was docked one-hundred driver and owner points.

On June 21, 2023, SHR announced that Childers would stay as crew chief of the No. 4 car in 2024 season with new driver Josh Berry after the retirement of Harvick.

On July 9, 2024, Spire Motorsports announced that Childers would replace Ryan Sparks as the crew chief of the No. 7 car, driven by Justin Haley, for the 2025 season. However, on April 23, 2025, Spire announced that Childers had left the team effective immediately.

On September 24, 2025, it was announced that Childers will join JR Motorsports to be the crew chief of the No. 1 car for the 2026 O'Reilly season.

== Motorsports career results ==
=== NASCAR ===
(key) (Bold – Pole position awarded by qualifying time. Italics – Pole position earned by points standings or practice time. * – Most laps led.)

==== Busch Series ====
NASCAR Busch Series results
| Year | Team | No. | Make | 1 | 2 | 3 | 4 | 5 | 6 | 7 | 8 | 9 | 10 | 11 | 12 | 13 | 14 | 15 | 16 | 17 | 18 | 19 | 20 | 21 | 22 | 23 | 24 | 25 | 26 | 27 | 28 | 29 | 30 | 31 | 32 | NBSC | Pts | Ref |
|---|---|---|---|---|---|---|---|---|---|---|---|---|---|---|---|---|---|---|---|---|---|---|---|---|---|---|---|---|---|---|---|---|---|---|---|---|---|---|
| 2000 | Jay Robinson Racing | 49 | Chevy | DAY | CAR | LVS | ATL | DAR | BRI | TEX | NSV | TAL | CAL | RCH | NHA | CLT | DOV | SBO | MYB; 43 | GLN | MLW | NZH | PPR | GTY | IRP | MCH | BRI | DAR | RCH | DOV | CLT | CAR | MEM | PHO | HOM | 119th | 34 | |
