= Moy Racing =

Defunct NASCAR auto racing team

Moy Racing, formerly PRW Racing and Bobby Jones Racing, was an auto racing team owned by former Ford Motor Company employee Joseph Reilly which fielded entries in the NASCAR Busch Series. Drivers who piloted the Moy Racing Ford include Jimmy Kitchens, Andy Kirby, Carl Long, Bruce Bechtel, Dana White, Brad Teague, Ed Berrier, Donnie Neuenberger, Shane Hall, Kertus Davis, Jeff McClure, Jason Rudd, Chris Diamond, Eric Jones, Ken Alexander, Mike Harmon, Shane Huffman, Kelly Denton, Derek Hayes, and Kieran Dynes.

== Motorsports results ==
=== Busch Series ===
==== Car No. 77 results ====
Year	Driver	No.	Make	1	2	3	4	5	6	7	8	9	10	11	12	13	14	15	16	17	18	19	20	21	22	23	24	25	26	27	28	29	30	31	32	33	34	Owners	Pts
1997	Jeff McClure	77	Ford	DAY; DNQ	CAR; 30	RCH; DNQ	ATL; DNQ	LVS; 23	DAR; DNQ	HCY; DNQ	TEX; 42	BRI; 37	NSV; 29	TAL; 30	NHA; 28	NZH; 24	CLT; DNQ	DOV; 36	SBO; DNQ		MLW; 39																		
1997	Scott Gaylord	77	Ford																	GLN; 28																			
1997	Brad Teague	77	Ford																			MYB; 34	GTY; 13	IRP; 20		BRI; 21													
1997	Ed Berrier	77	Ford																						MCH; 26			RCH; 18	DOV; 12	CLT; DNQ	CAL; 13	CAR; 41	HOM; 27						
1997	Ed Berrier	77	Chevy																								DAR; 25												
1998	Ed Berrier	77	Ford	DAY; 26	CAR; DNQ	LVS; 10	NSV; 36	DAR; 30	BRI; 43	TEX; 16	HCY; 1*	TAL; 34	NHA; 22	NZH; 6	CLT; 11	DOV; 24	RCH; 32	PPR; 17	GLN; 15	MLW; 37	MYB; 19	CAL; 41	SBO; 29	IRP; 13	MCH; 33	BRI; 24	DAR; 24	RCH; 32	DOV; 36	CLT; 26	GTY; 11	CAR; 29	ATL; 24	HOM; 17					
1999	Ed Berrier	77	Ford	DAY; DNQ	CAR; 29	LVS; DNQ	ATL; 14	DAR; 15	TEX; DNQ	NSV; 23	BRI; 12	TAL; 22	CAL; 10	NHA; 10	RCH; 19	NZH; 29	CLT; DNQ	DOV; 37	SBO; DNQ		MLW; 19	MYB; 28	PPR; 16	GTY; 22	IRP; 20														
1999	Scott Gaylord	77	Ford																	GLN; 25																			
1999	Kevin Lepage	77	Ford																							MCH; 9													
1999	Brad Teague	77	Ford																								BRI; 18												
1999	Mike Wallace	77	Ford																									DAR; 41											
1999	Chad Chaffin	77	Ford																										RCH; 9	DOV; 36	CLT; DNQ	CAR; 31	MEM; 15	PHO; 39	HOM; 22				
2000	Chad Chaffin	77	Ford	DAY; 35	CAR; 18	LVS; 38	ATL; 37	DAR; 24	BRI; 16	TEX; 32	NSV; 26	TAL; 26	CAL; DNQ	RCH; 11	NHA; 42	CLT; 26	DOV; 27	SBO; 34	MYB; 40		MLW; 20	NZH; 44																	
2000	Mike Wallace	77	Ford																	GLN; 41				GTY; 33	IRP; 14	MCH; 21		DAR; 26	RCH; 28	DOV; Wth	CLT; 43			PHO; 28					
2000	Scott Gaylord	77	Ford																				PPR; 37																
2000	Jeff Fuller	77	Ford																								BRI; 21												
2000	Ed Berrier	77	Ford																													CAR; 29							
2000	Kieran Dynes	77	Ford																														MEM; 43						
2000	Kelly Denton	77	Ford																																HOM; 30				
2001	Kelly Denton	77	Ford	DAY; 18	CAR; 27	LVS; 26	ATL; 37	DAR; 33	BRI; 18	TEX; 28	NSH																												
2001	Mike Harmon	77	Ford									TAL; 35	CAL																										
2001	Jason Rudd	77	Ford											RCH; 34	NHA																				CAR; 33				
2001	Brad Teague	77	Ford													NZH; 34	CLT; 40	DOV; 35	KEN; 40	MLW; 39			GTY; 37		IRP; 38		BRI; 36	DAR; 40					MEM; 43						
2001	John Finger	77	Ford																		GLN; 24																		
2001	Mark Green	77	Ford																			CHI; 24																	
2001	Jerry Robertson	77	Ford																					PPR; 27															
2001	Andy Kirby	77	Ford																							MCH; 30					KAN; 41					HOM; 32			
2001	Shane Huffman	77	Ford																										RCH; 24										
2001	Kertus Davis	77	Ford																											DOV; 34									
2001	Ken Alexander	77	Ford																													CLT; 41							
2001	Ross Thompson	77	Ford																															PHO; 40					
2002	Andy Kirby	77	Ford	DAY; 37	CAR; 38	LVS; 28	DAR; 31	BRI; 39	TEX; QL																														
2002	Brad Teague	77	Ford						TEX; 35	NSH; 24							DOV; 26	NSH; 28	KEN; 28				GTY; 29				BRI; 25												
2002	Jimmy Kitchens	77	Ford								TAL; 7			NHA; 22	NZH; 34	CLT; 40				MLW; 24	DAY; 17	CHI; 36			IRP; 27	MCH; 32		DAR; 30	RCH; 41	DOV; 41									
2002	Bruce Bechtel	77	Ford									CAL; 26												PPR; 40										ATL; 36		PHO; 32			
2002	Kertus Davis	77	Ford										RCH; 26																										
2002	Eric Jones	77	Ford																												KAN; 26								
2002	Donnie Neuenberger	77	Ford																													CLT; 26							
2002	Dana White	77	Ford																														MEM; 27		CAR; 38		HOM; 41		
2003	Donnie Neuenberger	77	Ford	DAY; 20						TAL; 21							DOV; 42				DAY; 30																		
2003	Brad Teague	77	Ford		CAR; 29		DAR; 23	BRI; 30			NSH; 23		RCH; 23	GTY; 37	NZH; 25	CLT; 39		NSH; 37	KEN; 33							MCH; 33	BRI; 20	DAR; 24		DOV; 30				ATL; 27	PHO; 34				
2003	Bruce Bechtel	77	Ford			LVS; 24			TEX; 32			CAL; 28																											
2003	Dana White	77	Ford																	MLW; 36			NHA; 21	PPR; 24	IRP; 28							CLT; 41							
2003	Jimmy Kitchens	77	Ford																			CHI; 24																	
2003	Jason Rudd	77	Ford																										RCH; 24										
2003	Ryck Sanders	77	Ford																												KAN; 26								
2003	Derek Hayes	77	Ford																														MEM; 24			CAR; 36	HOM; 35		
2004	Donnie Neuenberger	77	Ford	DAY; 38	CAR; 33	LVS; 41	DAR; 38	BRI; 43	TEX; DNQ		TAL; 33																												
2004	Chad Chaffin	77	Ford							NSH; DNQ																													
2004	Brad Teague	77	Ford									CAL; 39		RCH; DNQ	NZH; 31	CLT; 28	DOV; 30																						
2004	Shane Hall	77	Ford										GTY; 31																										
2004	Jimmy Kitchens	77	Ford															NSH; 39	KEN; 27	MLW; 27	DAY; 41	CHI; DNQ	NHA; 29	PPR; 32	IRP; DNQ	MCH; 27	BRI; 37		RCH; DNQ	DOV; 41	KAN; DNQ	CLT; DNQ	MEM; DNQ	ATL; DNQ	PHO	DAR	HOM; DNQ		
2004	Bruce Bechtel	77	Ford																									CAL; 33											
