= Kieran Dynes =

Irish racing driver

- Born: 18 December 1970 (age 55); Clonmore, Dungannon, Northern Ireland

NASCAR O'Reilly Auto Parts Series career
- 1 race run over 1 year
- Best finish: 118th (2000)
- First race: 2000 Sam's Town 250 (Memphis)
| Wins | Top tens | Poles |
|---|---|---|
| 0 | 0 | 0 |

Kieran Dynes (born 18 December 1970) is an Irish auto racing driver. He last competed in the European Late Model Series. He has also raced in the NASCAR Busch Series (now Xfinity Series) and the ARCA Racing Series in the United States.

== Career ==
=== American racing ===
Dynes along with IndyCar legend Dario Franchitti are the only UK drivers ever to compete in both the NASCAR Busch and ARCA series.

==== NASCAR ====
In 2000, Dynes made his debut in the Busch Series alongside 2010 Daytona 500 and 2010 Brickyard 400 champion Jamie McMurray. He replaced Mike Wallace in the No. 77 Lear UAW sponsored Ford which at the time was a very uncompetitive car and team. The race was held at Memphis Motorsports Park, in Memphis, Tennessee, and was won by Kevin Harvick. Jeff Green wrapped up the championship on the same day. Dynes started the event in 42nd place and retired early with engine problems.

==== ARCA ====
In 2001 in final practice at Lowe's Motor Speedway, Dynes was caught up in an accident which left him with back injuries.

=== European racing ===
In 2003, Dynes competed in Touring Cars and the ASCAR stock car series, based in Rockingham, England.

On 10 October 2010, Dynes made a successful return to the race track and took the checkered flag and first place in a late model stock car race at Warneton speedway Belgium. 2011 saw Dynes competing in the European Late Model Series; he drove the No. 51 Deuce brand-sponsored Chevrolet for British team Revolution Racing. Dynes retired from racing in 2013 after suffering a serious leg injury at Venray Speedway in the Netherlands; he had three European late model victories and a total of fourteen podium finishes.

== Motorsports career results ==
=== NASCAR ===
(key) (Bold – Pole position awarded by qualifying time. Italics – Pole position earned by points standings or practice time. * – Most laps led.)

==== Busch Series ====
NASCAR Busch Series results
| Year | Team | No. | Make | 1 | 2 | 3 | 4 | 5 | 6 | 7 | 8 | 9 | 10 | 11 | 12 | 13 | 14 | 15 | 16 | 17 | 18 | 19 | 20 | 21 | 22 | 23 | 24 | 25 | 26 | 27 | 28 | 29 | 30 | 31 | 32 | NBSC | Pts |
|---|---|---|---|---|---|---|---|---|---|---|---|---|---|---|---|---|---|---|---|---|---|---|---|---|---|---|---|---|---|---|---|---|---|---|---|---|---|
| 2000 | PRW Racing | 77 | Ford | DAY | CAR | LVS | ATL | DAR | BRI | TEX | NSV | TAL | CAL | RCH | NHA | CLT | DOV | SBO | MYB | GLN | MLW | NZH | PPR | GTY | IRP | MCH | BRI | DAR | RCH | DOV | CLT | CAR | MEM; 43 | PHO | HOM | 118th | 34 |
