= 2000 NASCAR Busch Series =

American motorsport season

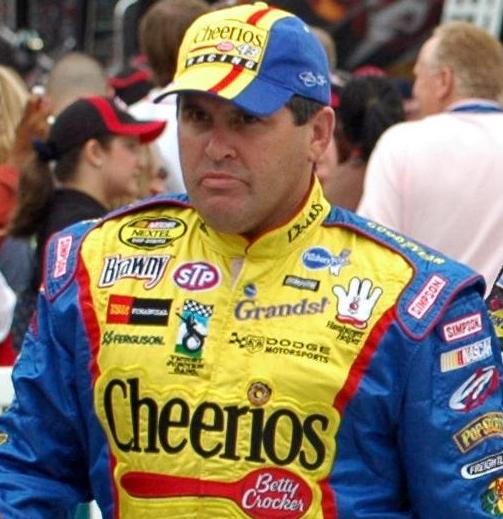
Jeff Green, the 2000 Busch Series champion

The 2000 NASCAR Busch Series began on February 19 and ended on November 11. Jeff Green of ppc Racing was crowned series champion.

== Teams and drivers ==
=== Full schedule ===
Car(s)	Team	No.	Driver(s)	Crew Chief(s)
Chevrolet	AllCar Motorsports	26	Bobby Hamilton Jr.	Todd Lohse
Chevrolet	BACE Motorsports	33	Tony Raines	Allen Russell 27; Lance Dieters 5
Chevrolet	Brewco Motorsports	27	Casey Atwood	Jason Ratcliff
Chevrolet	Brewco Motorsports	37	Kevin Grubb	Terry Shirley
Chevrolet	Cicci-Welliver Racing	34	David Green	Jay Guy 18; C. R. Miller 4 Wes Ward 6 Steve Bird 4
Chevrolet	Cicci-Welliver Racing	36	Tim Fedewa 31	Richard Lasater
Chevrolet	Cicci-Welliver Racing	36	Geoff Bodine 1	Richard Lasater
Chevrolet	Cicci-Welliver Racing	66	Todd Bodine	Donnie Richeson
Chevrolet	Curb/Agajanian Motorsports	43	Jay Sauter (R)	Gene Nead
Chevrolet	Dale Earnhardt, Inc.	3	Ron Hornaday Jr. (R)	Gere Kennon
Chevrolet	Herzog Motorsports	92	Jimmie Johnson (R)	Tony Liberati
Chevrolet	Innovative Motorsports	30	Hermie Sadler 18	Mike Greci
Chevrolet	Innovative Motorsports	30	Chad Little 6	Mike Greci
Chevrolet	Innovative Motorsports	30	Philip Morris 6	Mike Greci
Chevrolet	Innovative Motorsports	30	Mike Olsen 1	Mike Greci
Chevrolet	Innovative Motorsports	30	Butch Leitzinger 1	Mike Greci
Chevrolet	Innovative Motorsports	48	Mike McLaughlin 31	Darrell Terry 6 John Monsam 12; Scott Zipadelli 14
Chevrolet	Innovative Motorsports	48	Ward Burton 1	Darrell Terry 6 John Monsam 12; Scott Zipadelli 14
Chevrolet	Labonte Motorsports	44	Terry Labonte 8	Kevin Caldwell
Chevrolet	Labonte Motorsports	44	Justin Labonte 22	Kevin Caldwell
Chevrolet	Labonte Motorsports	44	Glenn Allen Jr. 1	Kevin Caldwell
Chevrolet	Labonte Motorsports	44	Brett Bodine 1	Kevin Caldwell
Chevrolet	Phoenix Racing	1	Randy LaJoie 31	Marc Reno
Chevrolet	Phoenix Racing	1	P. J. Jones (R) 1	Marc Reno
Chevrolet	ppc Racing	10	Jeff Green	Harold Holly
Chevrolet	ppc Racing	57	Jason Keller	Steve Addington
Chevrolet	Richard Childress Racing	2	Kevin Harvick (R)	Todd Berrier
Chevrolet	Richard Childress Racing	21	Mike Dillon	Lance Dieters 27; Gil Martin 5
Chevrolet	Reiser Enterprises	17	Matt Kenseth 21	Gary Cogswell 18; Russ Strupp 14
Chevrolet	Reiser Enterprises	17	Jason Schuler 11	Gary Cogswell 18; Russ Strupp 14
Chevrolet	SABCO Racing	81	Blaise Alexander	Ben Holm
Chevrolet	SABCO Racing	82	Dave Steele (R) 5	Bob Temple
Chevrolet	SABCO Racing	82	Sterling Marlin 1	Bob Temple
Chevrolet	SABCO Racing	82	Jeff Fuller 1	Bob Temple
Chevrolet	SABCO Racing	82	Derrick Gilchrist (R) 2	Bob Temple
Chevrolet	SABCO Racing	82	Glenn Allen Jr. 5	Bob Temple
Chevrolet	SABCO Racing	82	Jason White 2	Bob Temple
Chevrolet	SABCO Racing	82	Anthony Lazzaro (R) 1	Bob Temple
Chevrolet	SABCO Racing	82	Andy Houston 1	Bob Temple
Chevrolet	SABCO Racing	82	Austin Cameron 2	Bob Temple
Chevrolet	SABCO Racing	82	Ted Musgrave 9	Bob Temple
Chevrolet	SABCO Racing	82	Marty Houston 3	Bob Temple
Chevrolet	Spencer Motor Ventures	5	Dick Trickle	Bryan Schaffer
Chevrolet	ST Motorsports	59	Phil Parsons	Phil Hammer
Chevrolet	Team Amick	35	Lyndon Amick	Ricky Pearson
Chevrolet	Team Rensi Motorsports	25	Kenny Wallace 15	David Ifft 16; Greg Ely 16
Chevrolet	Team Rensi Motorsports	25	Andy Santerre 14	David Ifft 16; Greg Ely 16
Chevrolet	Team Rensi Motorsports	25	Ricky Craven 1	David Ifft 16; Greg Ely 16
Chevrolet	Team Rensi Motorsports	25	Randy Tolsma 1	David Ifft 16; Greg Ely 16
Chevrolet	Team Rensi Motorsports	25	Chad Chaffin 1	David Ifft 16; Greg Ely 16
Chevrolet	Team Parker	53	Hank Parker Jr.	Dave McCarty
Ford	Akins Motorsports	98	Elton Sawyer	Ricky Viers
Ford	Davis & Weight Motorsports	55	Michael Ritch (R)	Skip Eyler
Pontiac	Bill Davis Racing	20	Mike Borkowski (R) 9	Steve Bird 22; Bootie Barker 10
Pontiac	Bill Davis Racing	20	Dave Blaney 9	Steve Bird 22; Bootie Barker 10
Pontiac	Bill Davis Racing	20	Tom Hubert 10	Steve Bird 22; Bootie Barker 10
Pontiac	Bill Davis Racing	20	Scott Wimmer 4	Steve Bird 22; Bootie Barker 10
Pontiac	Joe Gibbs Racing	4	Jeff Purvis 31	Johnny Allen 5 Mike Byrd 8 Doug Richert 19
Pontiac	Joe Gibbs Racing	4	Curtis Markham 1	Johnny Allen 5 Mike Byrd 8 Doug Richert 19
Pontiac	Joe Gibbs Racing	18	Jason Leffler (R)	Bryant Frazier
Pontiac Chevrolet	Buckshot Racing	00	Buckshot Jones	Sandy Jones
Pontiac Chevrolet	Jarrett/Favre Motorsports	11	Jason Jarrett 28	Wes Ward 16; Rick Bowman 16
Pontiac Chevrolet	Jarrett/Favre Motorsports	11	Hut Stricklin 3	Wes Ward 16; Rick Bowman 16
Pontiac Chevrolet	Jarrett/Favre Motorsports	11	Morgan Shepherd 1	Wes Ward 16; Rick Bowman 16
Chevrolet Ford	HMV Motorsports	63	Mark Green	Jeff Hensley

=== Limited schedule ===
Team	Car(s)	No.	Driver(s)	Crew chief
Whitaker Racing	Chevrolet Monte Carlo	07	Billy Parker 1	N/A
Whitaker Racing	Chevrolet Monte Carlo	07	Hermie Sadler 1	N/A
Whitaker Racing	Chevrolet Monte Carlo	7	Hermie Sadler 1	N/A
Michael Waltrip Racing	Chevrolet Monte Carlo	7	Ted Christopher 2	Ronnie Silver
Michael Waltrip Racing	Chevrolet Monte Carlo	7	Michael Waltrip 12	Ronnie Silver
Michael Waltrip Racing	Chevrolet Monte Carlo	99	Michael Waltrip 4	Ronnie Silver
Michael Waltrip Racing	Chevrolet Monte Carlo	99	Ted Christopher 1	Ronnie Silver
J&J Racing	Chevrolet Monte Carlo	99	Glenn Allen Jr. 1	N/A
Alumni Motorsports	Chevrolet Monte Carlo	0	Johnny Rumley 9	Mike Steurer
Alumni Motorsports	Chevrolet Monte Carlo	0	Shane Hall 1	Mike Steurer
Alumni Motorsports	Chevrolet Monte Carlo	0	Lance Hooper 7	Mike Steurer
Bill Davis Racing	Pontiac Grand Prix	22	Kenny Wallace 1	Tommy Baldwin Jr.
Bill Davis Racing	Pontiac Grand Prix	22	Ward Burton 6	Tommy Baldwin Jr.
Bobby Hillin Racing	Chevrolet Monte Carlo	8	Bobby Hillin Jr. 22	Nick Short
Petty Enterprises	Chevrolet Monte Carlo	8	Steve Grissom 1	N/A
Petty Enterprises	Chevrolet Monte Carlo	45	Adam Petty 12	Chris Hussey
Petty Enterprises	Chevrolet Monte Carlo	45	Kyle Petty 14	Chris Hussey
PPI Motorsports	Ford Taurus	97	Scott Pruett 3	Pat Smith
PPI Motorsports	Ford Taurus	97	Anthony Lazzaro 13	Pat Smith
PPI Motorsports	Ford Taurus	97	Chad Little 1	Stan Hover
BACE Motorsports	Chevrolet Monte Carlo	74	Chad Little 3	Terry Wooten
BACE Motorsports	Chevrolet Monte Carlo	74	P. J. Jones 7	Billy Nacewicz
Emerald Performance Group	Chevrolet Monte Carlo	19	P. J. Jones 18	Christian Lovendahl; George Church
Emerald Performance Group	Chevrolet Monte Carlo	19	Morgan Shepherd 1	Christian Lovendahl; George Church
Emerald Performance Group	Chevrolet Monte Carlo	19	Jamie Skinner 1	Christian Lovendahl; George Church
Emerald Performance Group	Chevrolet Monte Carlo	19	Mike Bliss 1	Christian Lovendahl; George Church
Emerald Performance Group	Chevrolet Monte Carlo	19	Ricky Craven 4	Christian Lovendahl; George Church
Emerald Performance Group	Chevrolet Monte Carlo	19	Mike Skinner 4	Christian Lovendahl; George Church
Andy Petree Racing	Chevrolet Monte Carlo	15	Mike Skinner 6	Andy Petree
Andy Petree Racing	Chevrolet Monte Carlo	15	Jack Sprague 3	Andy Petree
Andy Petree Racing	Chevrolet Monte Carlo	15	Derrick Gilchrist 7	Andy Petree
Andy Petree Racing	Chevrolet Monte Carlo	15	Elliott Sadler 2	Andy Petree
Andy Petree Racing	Chevrolet Monte Carlo	51		Andy Petree
Andy Petree Racing	Chevrolet Monte Carlo	51	Derrick Gilchrist 1	Andy Petree
Andy Petree Racing	Chevrolet Monte Carlo	51	Elliott Sadler 1	Andy Petree
Phoenix Racing	Chevrolet Monte Carlo; Ford Taurus	51	Matt Hutter 2	N/A
Phoenix Racing	Chevrolet Monte Carlo; Ford Taurus	51	Randy LaJoie 1	N/A
Bown Racing	Chevrolet Monte Carlo	51	Jim Bown 2	Dick Bown
Brewco Motorsports	Chevrolet Monte Carlo	39	Andy Kirby 11	N/A
Brewco Motorsports	Ford Taurus	71	Kevin Lepage 10	N/A
Brewco Motorsports	Ford Taurus	71	Jamie McMurray 2	N/A
Day Enterprises	Pontiac Grand Prix	16	Mark Day 2	N/A
Day Enterprises	Pontiac Grand Prix	16	David Starr 4	N/A
Day Enterprises	Pontiac Grand Prix	16	Sammy Sanders 2	N/A
Orleans Racing	Chevrolet Monte Carlo	16	Brendan Gaughan 1	N/A
Forrest Urban Sr.	Chevrolet Monte Carlo	54	Forrest Urban Jr. 3	N/A
Forrest Urban Sr.	Chevrolet Monte Carlo	54	Richard Jarvis Jr. 1	N/A
Richard Jarvis Sr.	Chevrolet Monte Carlo	80	Richard Jarvis Jr. 2	N/A
SABCO Racing	Chevrolet Monte Carlo	42	Kenny Irwin Jr. 11	Tony Glover
SABCO Racing	Chevrolet Monte Carlo	42	Steadman Marlin 1	Tony Glover
SABCO Racing	Chevrolet Monte Carlo	01		Tony Glover
SABCO Racing	Chevrolet Monte Carlo	01	Steadman Marlin 1	Tony Glover
SABCO Racing	Chevrolet Monte Carlo	01	Sterling Marlin 5	Tony Glover
HRT Motorsports	Chevrolet Monte Carlo	72	Roberto Guerrero 1	N/A
HRT Motorsports	Chevrolet Monte Carlo	72	Jaime Guerrero 1	N/A
Jay Robinson Racing	Chevrolet Monte Carlo	49	Rodney Childers 1	N/A
Jay Robinson Racing	Chevrolet Monte Carlo	49	Brad Teague 1	N/A
Jay Robinson Racing	Chevrolet Monte Carlo	49	Brian Tyler 1	N/A
Joe Gibbs Racing	Pontiac Grand Prix	29	Curtis Markham 4	N/A
JG Motorsports	Chevrolet Monte Carlo	14	Ricky Hendrick 1	Patrick Donahue
JG Motorsports	Chevrolet Monte Carlo	24	Ricky Hendrick 15	
JG Motorsports	Chevrolet Monte Carlo	24	Jeff Gordon 5	Patrick Donahue
Lewis Motorsports	Chevrolet Monte Carlo	46	Ashton Lewis 22	N/A
Marsh Racing	Chevrolet Monte Carlo	31	Steve Park 13	Ted Marsh
Xpress Motorsports	Pontiac Grand Prix Chevrolet Monte Carlo	61	Hut Stricklin 10	Dave Fuge
Xpress Motorsports	Pontiac Grand Prix Chevrolet Monte Carlo	61	Darrell Lanigan 1	Dave Fuge
Xpress Motorsports	Pontiac Grand Prix Chevrolet Monte Carlo	61	Tim Sauter 5	Dave Fuge
Henderson Motorsports	Chevrolet Monte Carlo	75	Kelly Denton 5	Ron Denton
PRW Racing	Ford Taurus	77	Kelly Denton 1	Jimmy Means
PRW Racing	Ford Taurus	77	Chad Chaffin 18	Jimmy Means
PRW Racing	Ford Taurus	77	Mike Wallace 8	Jimmy Means
PRW Racing	Ford Taurus	77	Scott Gaylord 1	Jimmy Means
PRW Racing	Ford Taurus	77	Jeff Fuller 1	Jimmy Means
PRW Racing	Ford Taurus	77	Ed Berrier 1	Jimmy Means
PRW Racing	Ford Taurus	77	Kieran Dynes 1	Jimmy Means
Premiere Motorsports	Ford Taurus	68	Jay Fogleman 8	Jimmy Fitzgerald
Grubb Motorsports	Chevrolet Monte Carlo	52	Brandon Butler 2	Joe Covington
Grubb Motorsports	Chevrolet Monte Carlo	83	Brandon Butler 4	Franklin Butler
Grubb Motorsports	Chevrolet Monte Carlo	83	Wayne Grubb 21	Bobby King
NEMCO Motorsports	Chevrolet Monte Carlo	87	Joe Nemechek 14	Brian Pattie
NEMCO Motorsports	Chevrolet Monte Carlo	87	Ron Fellows 1	Brian Pattie
RC Racing	Chevrolet Monte Carlo	23	Ricky Craven 2	N/A
RC Racing	Chevrolet Monte Carlo	32	Ricky Craven 1	N/A
ppc Racing	Chevrolet Monte Carlo	32	Shane Hall 1	N/A
1/4 Ley Racing	Chevrolet Monte Carlo	32	Dale Quarterley 1	N/A
Roush Racing	Ford Taurus	9	Jeff Burton 14	Tommy Morgan
Roush Racing	Ford Taurus	60	Mark Martin 14	Tony Lambert
Sasser Motorsports	Chevrolet Monte Carlo	65	Ed Berrier 1	N/A
Smith Motorsports	Chevrolet Monte Carlo	79	R. D. Smith 1	N/A
Smith Brothers Motorsports	Pontiac Grand Prix	67	C. W. Smith 1	N/A
Buford Racing	Ford Taurus	67	Joe Buford 1	N/A
TDS Enterprises	Chevrolet Monte Carlo	78	Sammy Ragan 2	N/A
Washington-Erving Motorsports	Chevrolet Monte Carlo	50	Tony Roper 12	Darrell Bryant
Washington-Erving Motorsports	Chevrolet Monte Carlo	50	Stanton Barrett 1	Darrell Bryant
Wings Racing	Chevrolet Monte Carlo	58	Mario Gosselin 3	N/A
Young Racing	Chevrolet Monte Carlo	70	Ron Young 4	Larry Rapp
Young Racing	Chevrolet Monte Carlo	71	Ron Young 1	Larry Rapp
Petty-Huggins Motorsports	Chevrolet Monte Carlo	96	Gus Wasson 6	Greg Guarry
Petty-Huggins Motorsports	Chevrolet Monte Carlo	96	Mark McFarland 1	Greg Guarry
Petty-Huggins Motorsports	Chevrolet Monte Carlo	84	Mark McFarland 1	N/A
Petty-Huggins Motorsports	Chevrolet Monte Carlo	84	Greg Sacks 1	N/A
Joe Bessey Motorsports	Chevrolet Monte Carlo	6	Joe Bessey 1	N/A
Spencer Motor Ventures	Chevrolet Monte Carlo	12	Boris Said 2	N/A
Spencer Motor Ventures	Chevrolet Monte Carlo	12	Tracy Hines 1	N/A
Spencer Motor Ventures	Chevrolet Monte Carlo	12	Jimmy Spencer 6	N/A
Spencer Motor Ventures	Chevrolet Monte Carlo	12	John Preston 2	N/A
Spencer Motor Ventures	Chevrolet Monte Carlo	12	Ted Smokstad 1	N/A
Spencer Motor Ventures	Chevrolet Monte Carlo	12	Stanton Barrett 1	N/A
Baker Curb Racing	Chevrolet Monte Carlo	13	Brad Baker 5	N/A
Labonte Motorsports	Chevrolet Monte Carlo	04	Terry Labonte 1	N/A
Lockamy Racing	Chevrolet Monte Carlo	28	Tyler Walker 1	N/A
Ken Alexander	Chevrolet Monte Carlo	03	Ken Alexander 2	N/A
GTS Motorsports	Chevrolet Monte Carlo	90	Mike Stefanik 16	N/A
Bickle-Smith Motorsports	Pontiac Grand Prix	91	Rich Bickle 16	N/A
Herzog Motorsports	Chevrolet Monte Carlo	91	Johnny Benson Jr. 1	N/A
Marcrum Motorsports	Chevrolet Monte Carlo	86	Doug Reid III 5	N/A
Marcrum Motorsports	Chevrolet Monte Carlo	86	Gary Bradberry 1	N/A
Ken Schrader Racing	Chevrolet Monte Carlo	86	Rick Carelli 1	N/A
Sadler Brothers Racing	Chevrolet Monte Carlo	95	David Keith 1	N/A
Team Amick	Chevrolet Monte Carlo	88	Ken Schrader 1	N/A
Jarrett/Favre Motorsports	Pontiac Grand Prix	88	Hut Stricklin 1	N/A
Rob Totenhagen	Ford Taurus	88	Mel Walen 1	N/A
Rob Totenhagen	Ford Taurus	85	Mel Walen 2	N/A
Hoff Motorsports	Chevrolet Monte Carlo	93	Bill Hoff 3	N/A
Wittman Motorsports	Ford Taurus	93	Wayman Wittman 1	N/A
Verres Racing	Chevrolet Monte Carlo	67N	Jamie Aube 1	N/A
Dennis Demers	Chevrolet Monte Carlo	86N	Dennis Demers 1	N/A
Olsen Racing	Chevrolet Monte Carlo	61N	Mike Olsen 2	N/A
John Wall	Ford Taurus	73	Bryan Wall 2	N/A

Notes:

- If under "team", the owner's name is listed and in italics, that means the name of the race team that fielded the car is unknown.
- At Races 17 and 19 (Watkins Glen and Nazareth) they were combination races with NASCAR Busch North Series: John Preston, Jamie Aube, Mike Olsen, Dennis Demers, Bryan Wall and Dale Quarterley were competing for NASCAR Busch North Series championship and for that reason they did not scored points for Busch Series in that races.

== Races ==
=== NAPA Auto Parts 300 ===
The NAPA Auto Parts 300 was held February 19 at Daytona International Speedway. Hut Stricklin won the pole.

Top ten results

1. #17 - Matt Kenseth
2. #87 - Joe Nemechek
3. #44 - Terry Labonte
4. #43 - Jay Sauter
5. #2 - Kevin Harvick
6. #25 - Kenny Wallace
7. #1 - Randy LaJoie
8. #00 - Buckshot Jones
9. #21 - Mike Dillon
10. #53 - Hank Parker Jr.

Failed to qualify: Blaise Alexander (#81), Lyndon Amick (#35), Kevin Grubb (#37), C. W. Smith (#67), David Starr (#16), Tony Roper (#50), Ashton Lewis (#46), Michael Ritch (#55), Jimmie Johnson (#92), Shane Hall (#0), Ed Berrier (#65), Greg Sacks (#84), Glenn Allen Jr. (#99), Gus Wasson (#96)

- This race was marred by two separate flips involving Jeff Green and Michael Waltrip. Green's car went airborne and flipped once on lap 15, causing a 7-car pileup. Waltrip's car flipped several times in a single-car crash on lap 104. Both drivers were uninjured.

=== Alltel 200 ===
The Alltel 200 was held February 26 at North Carolina Speedway. Mark Martin won the pole.

Top ten results

1. #60 - Mark Martin
2. #10 - Jeff Green
3. #3 - Ron Hornaday Jr.
4. #57 - Jason Keller
5. #9 - Jeff Burton
6. #25 - Kenny Wallace
7. #37 - Kevin Grubb
8. #66 - Todd Bodine
9. #17 - Matt Kenseth
10. #35 - Lyndon Amick

Failed to qualify: Mike Skinner (#19), Ward Burton (#22), Hut Stricklin (#61), Kevin Harvick (#2), Dick Trickle (#5)*, Shane Hall (#0), Jason Jarrett (#11), Mike Stefanik (#90), Wayne Grubb (#83), Ricky Hendrick (#24), Ken Alexander (#03), Johnny Benson (#91)

- Dick Trickle failed to qualify his #5 car so he bought Michael Waltrip's place in the field and renumbered Waltrip's #7 to #5 car.

=== Sam's Town 300 ===
The Sam's Town 300 was held March 4 at Las Vegas Motor Speedway. Hank Parker Jr. won the pole.

Top ten results

1. #9 - Jeff Burton
2. #60 - Mark Martin
3. #87 - Joe Nemechek
4. #66 - Todd Bodine
5. #17 - Matt Kenseth
6. #10 - Jeff Green
7. #4 - Jeff Purvis
8. #3 - Ron Hornaday Jr.
9. #1 - Randy LaJoie
10. #61 - Hut Stricklin

Failed to qualify: Anthony Lazzaro (#97), Jay Sauter (#43), Rich Bickle (#91), Boris Said (#12), Gus Wasson (#96), Steve Park (#31), Tony Roper (#50), Hermie Sadler (#30), Shane Hall (#0), Mike Skinner (#19), Dave Steele (#82), Kenny Irwin Jr. (#42)

=== Aaron's 312 ===
The Aaron's 312 was held March 11 at Atlanta Motor Speedway. Matt Kenseth won the pole.

Top ten results

1. #60 - Mark Martin
2. #17 - Matt Kenseth
3. #71 - Kevin Lepage
4. #66 - Todd Bodine
5. #37 - Kevin Grubb
6. #34 - David Green
7. #81 - Blaise Alexander
8. #5 - Dick Trickle
9. #1 - Randy LaJoie
10. #42 - Kenny Irwin Jr.

Failed to qualify: Hermie Sadler (#30), Rich Bickle (#91), Tony Roper (#50), Gus Wasson (#96), Michael Ritch (#55), Jason Leffler (#18), Terry Labonte/Glenn Allen Jr. (#44), Dave Steele (#82), Gary Bradberry (#86), Ron Young (#70)

=== SunCom 200 ===
The SunCom 200 was held March 18 at Darlington Raceway. Mark Martin won the pole.

Top ten results

1. #60 - Mark Martin
2. #17 - Matt Kenseth
3. #9 - Jeff Burton
4. #10 - Jeff Green
5. #66 - Todd Bodine
6. #53 - Hank Parker Jr.
7. #34 - David Green
8. #3 - Ron Hornaday Jr.
9. #98 - Elton Sawyer
10. #35 - Lyndon Amick

Failed to qualify: Jason Jarrett (#11), Dave Steele (#82), Terry Labonte (#44), Wayne Grubb (#83), Ricky Hendrick (#24), Shane Hall (#0), Bobby Hillin Jr. (#8), Jeff Purvis (#4), Morgan Shepherd (#19), Tony Roper (#50)

=== Cheez-It 250 ===
The Cheez-It 250 was held March 25 at Bristol Motor Speedway. Jeff Green won the pole.

Top ten results

1. #82 - Sterling Marlin*
2. #10 - Jeff Green
3. #66 - Todd Bodine
4. #25 - Kenny Wallace
5. #1 - Randy LaJoie
6. #34 - David Green
7. #32 - Ricky Craven
8. #53 - Hank Parker Jr.
9. #57 - Jason Keller
10. #5 - Dick Trickle

Failed to qualify: Hermie Sadler (#30), Bobby Hillin Jr. (#8), Tony Roper (#50), Mike Borkowski (#20), Brad Teague (#49), Michael Ritch (#55), Shane Hall (#0), Tracy Hines (#12), Jason Jarrett (#11), Mark Day (#16)

- This would be Marlin's 2nd and final Busch Series victory, and his first since the 1990 All Pro 300.

=== Albertsons 300 ===
The Albertsons 300 was held April 1 at Texas Motor Speedway. Jason Leffler won the pole.

Top ten results

1. #60 - Mark Martin
2. #17 - Matt Kenseth
3. #34 - David Green
4. #66 - Todd Bodine
5. #10 - Jeff Green
6. #9 - Jeff Burton
7. #27 - Casey Atwood
8. #1 - Randy LaJoie
9. #2 - Kevin Harvick
10. #4 - Jeff Purvis

Failed to qualify: Chad Little (#30), Terry Labonte (#44), Bobby Hillin Jr. (#8), Anthony Lazzaro (#97), Michael Waltrip (#7), Tony Roper (#50), Jeff Fuller (#82), Michael Ritch (#55), Jason Jarrett (#11), Rich Bickle (#91), Dave Blaney (#20)

- The race was known for a controversial move by MTV Networks to not broadcast the race after a rain delay.

=== BellSouth Mobility 320 ===
The final BellSouth Mobility 320 was held April 8 at Nashville Speedway USA. Casey Atwood won the pole.

Top ten results

1. #1 - Randy LaJoie
2. #48 - Mike McLaughlin
3. #3 - Ron Hornaday Jr.
4. #2 - Kevin Harvick
5. #24 - Ricky Hendrick
6. #43 - Jay Sauter
7. #4 - Jeff Purvis
8. #34 - David Green
9. #66 - Todd Bodine
10. #92 - Jimmie Johnson

Failed to qualify: Andy Kirby (#39), Joe Buford (#67), Brad Baker (#13), David Keith (#95), Ron Young (#71), Kelly Denton (#75), Ashton Lewis (#46), Tyler Walker (#28), P. J. Jones (#19), Sammy Ragan (#78), Philip Morris (#30)

- This would be the last Busch Series race to be held at the old Nashville Fairgrounds Speedway, as the series would move to the new Nashville Superspeedway in 2001.

=== Touchstone Energy 300 ===
The Touchstone Energy 300 was held April 15 at Talladega Superspeedway. Todd Bodine won the pole.

Top ten results

1. #87 - Joe Nemechek
2. #00 - Buckshot Jones
3. #4 - Jeff Purvis
4. #26 - Bobby Hamilton Jr.
5. #10 - Jeff Green*
6. #61 - Hut Stricklin
7. #63 - Mark Green
8. #44 - Terry Labonte
9. #42 - Kenny Irwin Jr.
10. #20 - Mike Borkowski

Failed to qualify: Bobby Hillin Jr. (#8), Anthony Lazzaro (#97), Chad Little (#30), Kelly Denton (#75), Johnny Rumley (#0)

- Todd Bodine and Randy LaJoie finished outside the top-20, allowing Jeff Green to take the championship lead, and Green would hold it for the rest of the season.

=== Auto Club 300 ===
The Auto Club 300 was held April 29 at California Speedway. Jeff Green won the pole.

Top ten results

1. #17 - Matt Kenseth
2. #9 - Jeff Burton
3. #10 - Jeff Green
4. #7 - Michael Waltrip
5. #66 - Todd Bodine
6. #15 - Mike Skinner
7. #57 - Jason Keller
8. #53 - Hank Parker Jr.
9. #98 - Elton Sawyer
10. #43 - Jay Sauter

Failed to qualify: Bobby Hillin Jr. (#8), Tim Fedewa (#36), Lance Hooper (#0), Chad Chaffin (#77), Terry Labonte (#44), Tony Roper (#50), Michael Ritch (#55)

=== Hardee's 250 ===
The Hardee's 250 was held May 5 at Richmond International Raceway. Jeff Green won the pole.

Top ten results

1. #10 - Jeff Green
2. #17 - Matt Kenseth
3. #2 - Kevin Harvick
4. #60 - Mark Martin
5. #57 - Jason Keller
6. #31 - Steve Park
7. #66 - Todd Bodine
8. #27 - Casey Atwood
9. #35 - Lyndon Amick
10. #59 - Phil Parsons

Failed to qualify: Mike Stefanik (#90), Curtis Markham (#29), Lance Hooper (#0), Kenny Wallace (#25), P. J. Jones (#19)*, Kenny Irwin Jr. (#42), Jason Jarrett (#11), Tony Roper (#50), Chad Little (#30), Ken Alexander (#03)

- Final Busch Series start for Adam Petty.
- Christian Lovendahl, the crew chief for P. J. Jones and the Emerald Performance Group #19 team, was killed in a car crash in Mooresville, NC earlier in the day after Jones failed to qualify for the race.

=== Busch 200 ===
The Busch 200 was held May 13 at New Hampshire International Speedway. Tim Fedewa won the pole. The weekend was marred by the death of 19-year-old Adam Petty, who was killed after a stuck throttle sent his car crashing into the Turn 3 wall during practice.

Top ten results

1. #36 - Tim Fedewa
2. #10 - Jeff Green
3. #57 - Jason Keller
4. #66 - Todd Bodine
5. #53 - Hank Parker Jr.
6. #25 - Andy Santerre
7. #27 - Casey Atwood
8. #34 - David Green
9. #98 - Elton Sawyer
10. #31 - Steve Park

Failed to qualify: Ricky Hendrick (#24), Tony Roper (#50), Wayne Grubb (#83), Ashton Lewis (#46), Andy Kirby (#39)

Withdrew: Adam Petty (#45)

=== Carquest Auto Parts 300 ===
The Carquest Auto Parts 300 was held May 27 at Lowe's Motor Speedway. Dave Blaney won the pole.

Top ten results

1. #9 - Jeff Burton
2. #60 - Mark Martin
3. #10 - Jeff Green
4. #24 - Jeff Gordon
5. #66 - Todd Bodine
6. #87 - Joe Nemechek
7. #71 - Kevin Lepage
8. #2 - Kevin Harvick
9. #98 - Elton Sawyer
10. #81 - Blaise Alexander

Failed to qualify: P. J. Jones (#19), Michael Waltrip (#7), Anthony Lazzaro (#97), Jeff Purvis (#4), Mark Green (#63), Wayne Grubb (#83), Jim Bown (#51), Ashton Lewis (#46), Stanton Barrett (#50), Roberto Guerrero (#72), Michael Ritch (#55), Bobby Hillin Jr. (#8), Rich Bickle (#91), Justin Labonte (#44)

=== MBNA Platinum 200 ===
The MBNA Platinum 200 was held June 3 at Dover International Speedway. Kevin Harvick won the pole.

Top ten results

1. #57 - Jason Keller
2. #60 - Mark Martin
3. #17 - Matt Kenseth
4. #10 - Jeff Green
5. #87 - Joe Nemechek
6. #2 - Kevin Harvick
7. #7 - Michael Waltrip
8. #20 - Dave Blaney
9. #98 - Elton Sawyer
10. #48 - Mike McLaughlin

Failed to qualify: Mike Stefanik (#90), Bobby Hillin Jr. (#8), Jason Jarrett (#11), Chad Little (#30), Rich Bickle (#91)

- This race saw the Petty Enterprises #45 team return to competition for the first time since Adam Petty's death, with Adam's father Kyle driving.

=== Textilease/Medique 300 ===
The final Textilease/Medique 300 was held June 10 at South Boston Speedway. Casey Atwood won the pole.

Top ten results

1. #10 - Jeff Green
2. #33 - Tony Raines
3. #98 - Elton Sawyer
4. #3 - Ron Hornaday Jr.
5. #91 - Rich Bickle
6. #92 - Jimmie Johnson
7. #57 - Jason Keller
8. #2 - Kevin Harvick
9. #8 - Bobby Hillin Jr.
10. #25 - Andy Santerre

Failed to qualify: R. D. Smith (#79), Forrest Urban Jr. (#54)

- This was the last Busch Series race to be held at South Boston Speedway.

=== Myrtle Beach 250 ===
The final Myrtle Beach 250 was held June 17 at Myrtle Beach Speedway. Jeff Green won the pole.

Top ten results

1. #10 - Jeff Green
2. #2 - Kevin Harvick
3. #98 - Elton Sawyer
4. #57 - Jason Keller
5. #91 - Rich Bickle
6. #66 - Todd Bodine
7. #18 - Jason Leffler
8. #37 - Kevin Grubb
9. #3 - Ron Hornaday Jr.
10. #43 - Jay Sauter

Failed to qualify: Richard Jarvis Jr. (#54), Jason Jarrett (#11), Andy Kirby (#39), Lance Hooper (#0)

- This was the last Busch Series race to be held at Myrtle Beach Speedway.
- Jay Robinson Racing made its NASCAR debut in this race, fielding the #49 Chevy with future championship-winning crew chief Rodney Childers driving. Childers started 33rd and finished 43rd after crashing out on lap 69. This was also Childers' only career start as a driver in NASCAR's top-3 series'.

=== Lysol 200 ===
The Lysol 200 was held June 25 at Watkins Glen International. Ron Fellows won the pole.

Top ten results

1. #87 - Ron Fellows
2. #30 - Butch Leitzinger
3. #2 - Kevin Harvick
4. #66 - Todd Bodine
5. #48 - Mike McLaughlin
6. #36 - Tim Fedewa
7. #98 - Elton Sawyer
8. #43 - Jay Sauter
9. #19 - P. J. Jones
10. #10 - Jeff Green

Failed to qualify: Michael Ritch (#55), Dale Quarterley (#32), Jaime Guerrero (#72), John Preston (#12)

- This race was known for a massive crash involving Jimmie Johnson. On lap 45, Johnson suffered a brake failure entering turn 1, sending his car careening off the track and into the foam barrier at high-speed. Johnson was uninjured, even standing on top of the car and pumping his fists in the air after the wreck.

=== Sears DieHard 250 ===
The Sears DieHard 250 was held July 2 at The Milwaukee Mile. Jeff Green won the pole.

Top ten results

1. #10 - Jeff Green
2. #4 - Jeff Purvis
3. #1 - Randy LaJoie
4. #36 - Tim Fedewa
5. #57 - Jason Keller
6. #98 - Elton Sawyer
7. #53 - Hank Parker Jr.
8. #45 - Kyle Petty*
9. #92 - Jimmie Johnson
10. #3 - Ron Hornaday Jr.

Failed to qualify: Ricky Hendrick (#24), Ted Smokstad (#12), Ashton Lewis (#46), Mario Gosselin (#58), Brad Baker (#13), David Starr (#16), Mel Walen (#88), Doug Reid III (#86)

- Scott Hansen qualified the #45 for Kyle Petty.

=== Econo Lodge 200 ===
The Econo Lodge 200 was held July 16 at Nazareth Speedway. Jeff Green won the pole.

Top ten results

1. #3 - Ron Hornaday Jr.*
2. #98 - Elton Sawyer
3. #57 - Jason Keller
4. #10 - Jeff Green
5. #45 - Kyle Petty
6. #4 - Jeff Purvis
7. #27 - Casey Atwood
8. #1 - Randy LaJoie
9. #37 - Kevin Grubb
10. #43 - Jay Sauter

Failed to qualify: Jason Jarrett (#11), Bill Hoff (#93), Derrick Gilchrest (#15)

- This was Hornaday's first career Busch Series victory.

=== NAPA Autocare 250 ===
The NAPA Autocare 250 was held July 22 at Pikes Peak International Raceway. Jeff Purvis won the pole.

Top ten results

1. #10 - Jeff Green
2. #34 - David Green
3. #25 - Andy Santerre
4. #53 - Hank Parker Jr.
5. #59 - Phil Parsons
6. #27 - Casey Atwood
7. #30 - Hermie Sadler
8. #48 - Mike McLaughlin
9. #3 - Ron Hornaday Jr.
10. #36 - Tim Fedewa

Failed to qualify: Brendan Gaughan (#16)

=== Carquest Auto Parts 250 ===
The Carquest Auto Parts 250 was held July 29 at Gateway International Raceway. Jeff Green won the pole. Qualifying for this event was rained out.

Top ten results

1. #2 - Kevin Harvick*
2. #4 - Jeff Purvis
3. #66 - Todd Bodine
4. #57 - Jason Keller
5. #10 - Jeff Green
6. #3 - Ron Hornaday Jr.
7. #87 - Joe Nemechek
8. #25 - Kenny Wallace
9. #45 - Kyle Petty
10. #98 - Elton Sawyer

Failed to qualify: Bobby Hillin Jr. (#8), Andy Kirby (#39), Hut Stricklin (#11), Johnny Rumley (#0), Mel Walen (#85), Doug Reid III (#86), Curtis Markham (#29), Jay Fogleman (#68)

- This was Harvick's first career Busch Series victory.

=== Kroger 200 ===
The Kroger 200 was held August 4 at Indianapolis Raceway Park at Indianapolis Raceway Park. Jason Leffler won the pole.

Top ten results

1. #3 - Ron Hornaday Jr.
2. #4 - Jeff Purvis
3. #10 - Jeff Green
4. #18 - Jason Leffler
5. #57 - Jason Keller
6. #98 - Elton Sawyer
7. #66 - Todd Bodine
8. #2 - Kevin Harvick
9. #34 - David Green
10. #25 - Andy Santerre

Failed to qualify: Brad Baker (#13), Justin Labonte (#44), Sammy Sanders (#16), Jay Fogleman (#68), Brian Tyler (#49), Mel Walen (#85), Forrest Urban Jr. (#54), Bill Hoff (#93)

=== NAPAonline.com 250 ===
The NAPAonline.com 250 was held August 19 at Michigan International Speedway. Buckshot Jones won the pole.

Top ten results

1. #66 - Todd Bodine
2. #7 - Michael Waltrip
3. #9 - Jeff Burton
4. #22 - Ward Burton
5. #48 - Mike McLaughlin
6. #92 - Jimmie Johnson
7. #24 - Jeff Gordon
8. #17 - Matt Kenseth
9. #2 - Kevin Harvick
10. #97 - Chad Little

Failed to qualify: Morgan Shepherd (#11), Michael Ritch (#55), P. J. Jones (#19), Rich Bickle (#91), Brett Bodine (#44), Doug Reid III (#86), Mark Martin (#60)

=== Food City 250 ===
The Food City 250 was held August 25 at Bristol Motor Speedway. Kevin Harvick won the pole.

Top ten results

1. #2 - Kevin Harvick
2. #57 - Jason Keller
3. #10 - Jeff Green
4. #25 - Kenny Wallace
5. #01 - Sterling Marlin
6. #43 - Jay Sauter
7. #4 - Jeff Purvis
8. #99 - Michael Waltrip
9. #27 - Casey Atwood
10. #34 - David Green

Failed to qualify: Jay Fogleman (#68), Wayne Grubb (#83), David Starr (#16), Matt Kenseth (#17), P. J. Jones (#19), Ashton Lewis (#46), Ron Young (#70), Tom Hubert (#20), Ricky Hendrick (#24), Doug Reid III (#86), Justin Labonte (#44)

=== Dura Lube/All Pro Bumper to Bumper 200 ===
The Dura Lube/All Pro Bumper to Bumper 200 was held September 2 at Darlington Raceway. Mark Martin won the pole.

Top ten results

1. #60 - Mark Martin*
2. #9 - Jeff Burton
3. #98 - Elton Sawyer
4. #10 - Jeff Green
5. #48 - Ward Burton
6. #57 - Jason Keller
7. #01 - Sterling Marlin
8. #17 - Matt Kenseth
9. #20 - Dave Blaney
10. #2 - Kevin Harvick

Failed to qualify: Steve Park (#31), Justin Labonte (#44), Andy Kirby (#39), Mike Stefanik (#90), Jason Jarrett (#11), Stanton Barrett (#12)

- This would be Martin's last Busch Series victory until February 2005.

=== Autolite/Fram 250 ===
The Autolite/Fram 250 was held September 8 at Richmond International Raceway. Todd Bodine won the pole.

Top ten results

1. #9 - Jeff Burton
2. #10 - Jeff Green
3. #60 - Mark Martin
4. #66 - Todd Bodine
5. #37 - Kevin Grubb
6. #25 - Kenny Wallace
7. #5 - Dick Trickle
8. #17 - Matt Kenseth
9. #12 - Jimmy Spencer
10. #34 - David Green

Failed to qualify: Michael Ritch (#55), Rich Bickle (#91), Tim Sauter (#61), Steve Park (#31), Ashton Lewis (#46), Mike Stefanik (#90), Justin Labonte (#44), Wayne Grubb (#83), Jay Fogleman (#68), Hermie Sadler (#07), Forrest Urban Jr. (#54), Richard Jarvis Jr. (#80), Bill Hoff (#93)

=== MBNA.com 200 ===
The MBNA.com 200 was held September 23 at Dover International Speedway. Mike Skinner won the pole.

Top ten results

1. #17 - Matt Kenseth
2. #57 - Jason Keller
3. #20 - Dave Blaney
4. #66 - Todd Bodine
5. #87 - Joe Nemechek
6. #00 - Buckshot Jones
7. #37 - Kevin Grubb
8. #21 - Mike Dillon
9. #31 - Steve Park
10. #18 - Jason Leffler

Failed to qualify: Terry Labonte (#44), P. J. Jones (#19), Andy Kirby (#39)

- Championship leader Jeff Green crashed out on lap 30 and finished 42nd. This finish, along with Daytona in February, would be Green's only DNFs of the season, and his only finishes outside the top-15.

=== All Pro Bumper to Bumper 300 ===
The All Pro Bumper to Bumper 300 was held October 7 at Lowe's Motor Speedway. Matt Kenseth won the pole.

Top ten results

1. #17 - Matt Kenseth
2. #60 - Mark Martin
3. #20 - Dave Blaney
4. #10 - Jeff Green
5. #87 - Joe Nemechek
6. #57 - Jason Keller
7. #26 - Bobby Hamilton Jr.
8. #82 - Ted Musgrave
9. #3 - Ron Hornaday Jr.
10. #9 - Jeff Burton

Failed to qualify: Justin Labonte (#44), Steve Park (#31), Sterling Marlin (#01), Rich Bickle (#91), Mike Stefanik (#90), Johnny Rumley (#0), Chad Little (#74), Michael Ritch (#55), Terry Labonte (#04), Ricky Craven (#19), Ashton Lewis (#46), Jay Fogleman (#68)

=== Sam's Club 200 ===
The Sam's Club 200 was held October 21 at North Carolina Speedway. Mark Martin won the pole.

Top ten results

1. #10 - Jeff Green*
2. #9 - Jeff Burton
3. #57 - Jason Keller
4. #66 - Todd Bodine
5. #22 - Ward Burton
6. #60 - Mark Martin
7. #17 - Matt Kenseth
8. #27 - Casey Atwood
9. #25 - Kenny Wallace
10. #2 - Kevin Harvick

Failed to qualify: Jason Jarrett (#11), Andy Kirby (#39), Michael Waltrip (#99), Lyndon Amick (#35), Brandon Butler (#83), Mike Stefanik (#90), Tim Sauter (#61), Scott Wimmer (#20), Rich Bickle (#91), Jay Fogleman (#68)

- This victory extended Jeff Green's championship lead to 536 points ahead of Jason Keller, whose 3rd-place finish meant that Green would have to start the next race at Memphis to lock-up the championship.

=== Sam's Town 250 ===
The Sam's Town 250 was held October 29 at Memphis Motorsports Park. Jeff Green won the pole.

Top ten results

1. #2 - Kevin Harvick
2. #98 - Elton Sawyer
3. #10 - Jeff Green*
4. #1 - Randy LaJoie
5. #36 - Tim Fedewa
6. #27 - Casey Atwood
7. #26 - Bobby Hamilton Jr.
8. #92 - Jimmie Johnson
9. #43 - Jay Sauter
10. #4 - Jeff Purvis

Failed to qualify: Ashton Lewis (#46), Mike Stefanik (#90), Jason Jarrett (#11), Ron Young (#70), Sammy Sanders (#16), Steadman Marlin (#01), Richard Jarvis Jr. (#80), Wayman Wittman (#93)

- By starting the race, Jeff Green clinched the 2000 Busch Series championship with two races remaining.

=== Outback Steakhouse 200 ===
The Outback Steakhouse 200 was held November 4 at Phoenix International Raceway. Jason Leffler won the pole.

Top ten results

1. #9 - Jeff Burton
2. #18 - Jason Leffler
3. #15 - Mike Skinner
4. #10 - Jeff Green
5. #3 - Ron Hornaday Jr.
6. #17 - Matt Kenseth
7. #25 - Kenny Wallace
8. #57 - Jason Keller
9. #34 - David Green
10. #4 - Jeff Purvis

Failed to qualify: Curtis Markham (#29), Hut Stricklin (#11), Justin Labonte (#44), Ashton Lewis (#46), Rich Bickle (#91), Brandon Butler (#83), Rick Carelli (#86)

=== Miami 300 ===
The Miami 300 was held November 11 at Homestead-Miami Speedway. Bobby Hamilton Jr. won the pole.

Top ten results

1. #24 - Jeff Gordon*
2. #60 - Mark Martin
3. #10 - Jeff Green
4. #57 - Jason Keller
5. #9 - Jeff Burton
6. #92 - Jimmie Johnson
7. #53 - Hank Parker Jr.
8. #17 - Matt Kenseth
9. #45 - Kyle Petty
10. #36 - Tim Fedewa

Failed to qualify: Mike Dillon (#21), Sterling Marlin (#01), Chad Little (#74), Justin Labonte (#44), Michael Ritch (#55), Rich Bickle (#91), Lyndon Amick (#35), Curtis Markham (#29), Ricky Craven (#19), Mark McFarland (#84), Ashton Lewis (#46), Mark Green (#63)

- This was Jeff Gordon's last career Busch Series victory, and his last Busch Series start. This was also the last start for JG Motorsports.

== Full Drivers' Championship ==
(key) Bold – Pole position awarded by time. Italics – Pole position set by owner's points. * – Most laps led.

Pos	Driver	DAY	CAR	LVS	ATL	DAR	BRI	TEX	NSV	TAL	CAL	RCH	NHA	CLT	DOV	SBO	MYB	GLN	MIL	NAZ	PPR	GTY	IRP	MCH	BRI	DAR	RCH	DOV	CLT	CAR	MEM	PHO	HOM	Pts
1	Jeff Green	42	2	6	13	4	**2**	5	12*	5	**3**	**1**	2	3	4	1*	**1***	10	**1***	**4**	1*	5	3*	14	3	4	2	42	4	1	**3***	4	3	5005
2	Jason Keller	12	4	34	43	14	9	11	22	22	7	5	3	19	1	7	4	11	5	3	12	4	5	23	2	6	11	2	6	3	15	8	4	4389
3	Kevin Harvick **(R)**	5	DNQ	13	34	15	26	9*	4	16	14	3	18	8	**6***	8	2	3	11	17	11	1*	8	9	**1***	10	20	22	24	10	1	27	21	4113
4	Todd Bodine	34	8	4	4	5	3	4	9	25	5	7	4	5	13	36	6	4	31	40	21	3	7	1*	30	16	**4**	4	42	4	20	12	32	4075
5	Ron Hornaday Jr. **(R)**	32*	3	8	16	8	18	17	3	20	19	17	20	12	18	4	9	36	10	1*	9	6	1	30	15	34	37	14	9	11	14	5	38	3870
6	Elton Sawyer	30	12	25	18	9	12	28	13	18	9	34	9	9	9	3	3	7	6	2	25	10	6	31	29	3	19	33	29	19	2	11	40	3776
7	Randy LaJoie	7	11	9	9	18	5	8	1	36	16	21	39	22	25	23	14	15	3	8	41	11	13	26	31	14	13	31	15	18	4	13	24	3670
8	Casey Atwood	31	32	11	26	42	21	7	**24**	17	22	8	7	14	11	**13**	11	12	43	7	6	29	31	37	9	27	34	17	22	8	6	14	20	3404
9	David Green	11	36	19	6	7	6	3	8	40	40	18	8	13	24	22	25	44	30	18	2	26	9	33	10	24	10	37	37	27	41	9	17	3316
10	Jimmie Johnson **(R)**	DNQ	22	26	27	36	24	24	10	29	15	12	13	16	20	6	15	43	9	14	18	13	11	6	23	38	22	18	28	13	8	40	6	3264
11	Jeff Purvis	29	43	7	30	DNQ	14	10	7	3	29	38	41	DNQ	12	17	42		2	6	**13**	2	2	12	7	23	31	19	27	38	10	10	11	3212
12	Phil Parsons	13	23	14	14	20	17	34	29	23	24	10	12	24	29	15	27	25	42	20	5	23	22	19	14	17	39	15	31	22	19	26	19	3176
13	Kevin Grubb	DNQ	7	12	5	12	11	14	14	15	17	37	38	28	36	37	8	24	12	9	16	31	30	34	43	25	5	7	18	41	13	17	41	3124
14	Hank Parker Jr.	10	25	**31**	17	6	8	35	16	41	8	33	5	42	41	19	22	39	7	21	4	12	35	25	16	19	40	12	21	43	34	22	7	3109
15	Tony Raines	21	24	16	12	21	22	15	36	33	20	15	15	25	16	2	17	14	26	12	43	28	40	35	11	39	41	24	19	26	12	18	33	3061
16	Jay Sauter **(R)**	4	14	DNQ	39	22	31	19	6	27	10	36	16	35	30	40	10	8	27	10	27	18	32	32	6	22	25	30	25	20	9	43	13	3037
17	Matt Kenseth	1	9	5	**2**	2	27	2		21	1	2		30	3									8	DNQ	8	8	1*	**1**	7		6	8	3022
18	Tim Fedewa	24	39	20	40	11	28	41	11	31	DNQ	20	**1***	27	19	12	38	6	4	19	10	21	41	16	13	37	36	11	23		5	29	10	3009
19	Bobby Hamilton Jr.	28	21	41	38	30	36	29	19	4	35	14	11	23	37	14	18	21	13	33	17	19	24	18	38	43	33	13	7	25	7	24	**22**	2968
20	Jason Leffler **(R)**	20	19	28	DNQ	37	25	**22**	21	28	39	35	24	21	28	32	7	28	15	15	24	15	**4**	41	36	28	15	10	36	30	16	**2**	12	2956
21	Buckshot Jones	8	38	24	36	25	34	26	38	2	23	26	19	17	23	33	31	20	40	25	19	20	29	**40**	27	20	26	6	26	17	11	25	16	2952
22	Dick Trickle	16	41	29	8	32	10	12	33	37	13	23	30	37	17	39	26	40	19	35	14	16	25	15	35	33	7	20	34	40	25	23	23	2808
23	Mike Dillon	9	17	22	19	13	37	38	37	34	28	19	36	18	32	20	37	19	25	37	20	32	12	22	32	21	17	8	20	36	27	31	DNQ	2743
24	Mike McLaughlin	26	15	43	21	33	42	40	2	14	41	25	33	32	10	24	30	5	28	34	8	36	34	5	28		30	34	39	16	24	15	31	2690
25	Blaise Alexander	DNQ	30	21	7	28	22	18	28	30	38	31	40	10	31	27	34	13	18	26	22	35	16	39	41	35	18	21	30	34	31	38	28	2540
26	Mark Green	18	26	27	29	40	13	25	41	7	25	24	25	DNQ	33	30	29	18	23	42	31	30	18	28	26	36	23	26	33	23	26	33	DNQ	2470
27	Mark Martin		**1***	2	1*	**1**		1				4*		2	2									DNQ		**1**	3		2	**6**			2*	2280
28	Lyndon Amick	DNQ	10	37	15	10	19	33	43	35	11	9	37	11	35	16	16	38	34	41	23	39	43	38	17	40	35	39	35	DNQ	30	36	DNQ	2266
29	Jeff Burton		5	1*		3*		6			2*	41		1*										3		2*	1*		10	2*		1*	5	2259
30	Kenny Wallace	6	6		41	31	4	30		11		DNQ		41								8			4	11	6		11	9		7		1814
31	Kyle Petty														26				8	5		9	15	11	19	13	29	40	17	15	21	16	9	1710
32	Joe Nemechek	2		3	33			36		1*	37			6	5							7		13				5	5*			42	35	1691
33	Michael Ritch **(R)**	DNQ	16	39	DNQ	39	DNQ	DNQ	39	13	DNQ	42	22	DNQ	15	25	24	DNQ	16	43	32	22	20	DNQ	25	42	DNQ	23	DNQ	21	42	35	DNQ	1643
34	Andy Santerre			30				20	15		21		6		39	10	19	27	14	23	3		10								32			1498
35	Hermie Sadler	14	20	DNQ	DNQ	41	DNQ												17	11	7	27	17	36	24	31	DNQ	27		24	23	30	42	1449
36	Chad Chaffin	35	18	38	37	24	16	32	26	26	DNQ	11	42	26	27	34	40		20	44													26	1373
37	Michael Waltrip	27	QL	15			32	DNQ			4			DNQ	7									2	8	15	16	36	14	DNQ		37		1356
38	P. J. Jones **(R)**	40	35	35	24	27	39	31	DNQ	38	42	DNQ	17	DNQ	40	35	41	9	38	39	40	37	26	DNQ	DNQ			DNQ					37	1262
39	Jason Jarrett	17	DNQ	42	22	DNQ	DNQ	DNQ	23	39	33	DNQ	35	33	DNQ	26	DNQ	32	33	DNQ			27		22	DNQ	24	43	41	DNQ	DNQ		36	1187
40	Wayne Grubb	41	DNQ	23	20	DNQ	29	21				39	DNQ	DNQ	22	43	20		29	32	15	24	39		DNQ	32	DNQ							1158
41	Bobby Hillin Jr.	33	42	32	23	DNQ	DNQ	DNQ	18	DNQ	DNQ	13	32	DNQ	DNQ	9	23	29	22	24	42	DNQ	42											1137
42	Kevin Lepage		13		3			27				43		7											12	12	12		38				27	1063
43	Steve Park			DNQ		17		13				6	10		Wth							25				DNQ	DNQ	9	DNQ	12		41	29	999
44	Jason Schuler								32				14			38	32	22	21	16	30	14	33								17			991
45	Hut Stricklin	**36**	DNQ	10	11	26	38	37	17	6	36										28	DNQ		27								DNQ		983
46	Dave Blaney							DNQ			18	22		**36**	8											9	21	3	3					976
47	Adam Petty	37	27	17	25	16	40	39	34	12	27	16	Wth																					928
48	Justin Labonte		28						20			27	23	DNQ		31	33	33	37	22	36	40	DNQ		DNQ	DNQ	DNQ	DNQ	DNQ	33	39	DNQ	DNQ	913
49	Ricky Hendrick		DNQ			DNQ			5			28	DNQ			42	13		DNQ		26	38	36		DNQ	29			13	39			39	876
50	Kenny Irwin Jr.	39	31	DNQ	10	19	30	16		9	32	DNQ		20																				852
51	Ashton Lewis	DNQ				38			DNQ			29	DNQ	DNQ	42			23	DNQ	28	29		23	17	DNQ	30	DNQ	25	DNQ	31	DNQ	DNQ	DNQ	848
52	Mike Skinner	43	DNQ	DNQ	32						6			15	14													**35**	16			3		833
53	Ted Musgrave																					17	21	20	37	41	27	32	8		22			795
54	Ward Burton		DNQ								34			34										4		5			12	5				724
55	Anthony Lazzaro **(R)**		29	DNQ	42	34	43	DNQ	25	DNQ	26	30	27	DNQ				17	32															718
56	Mike Stefanik **(R)**		DNQ			23	20					DNQ		39	DNQ			31		13					20	DNQ	DNQ	41	DNQ	DNQ	DNQ		18	689
57	Jeff Gordon			18				42						4										7									1	637
58	Tom Hubert															29	21	37	24	36	34	34	38	29	DNQ									626
59	Mike Wallace																	41				33	14	21		26	28	Wth	43			28		602
60	Mike Borkowski **(R)**	22	40	40	28	43	DNQ		42	10			21																					567
61	Derrick Gilchrist **(R)**				35				27	32	43		28						41	DNQ	38		19	43										549
62	Sterling Marlin						1*																		5	7	43		DNQ				DNQ	525
63	Ricky Craven						7						34											24	18				DNQ	42		39	DNQ	490
64	Terry Labonte	3			DNQ	DNQ	35	DNQ		8	DNQ				21														DNQ					470
65	Jimmy Spencer													40										42	39		9	38					25	406
66	Chad Little							DNQ		DNQ	12	DNQ		31	DNQ									10					DNQ	32			DNQ	398
67	Glenn Allen Jr.	DNQ		33							31	40	31	29	34																			384
68	Johnny Rumley								35	DNQ										29	33	DNQ	37		42			29	DNQ					363
69	Brandon Butler											32															14	16		DNQ	40	DNQ		346
70	Rich Bickle			DNQ	DNQ	29		DNQ						DNQ	DNQ	5	5		35			41		DNQ			DNQ		DNQ	DNQ		DNQ	DNQ	329
71	Kelly Denton	38					15		DNQ	DNQ															34								30	301
72	Andy Kirby	Wth							DNQ	19			DNQ				DNQ					DNQ	28		33	DNQ		DNQ		DNQ	38			298
73	Tim Sauter																										DNQ			DNQ	29	21	15	294
74	Philip Morris								DNQ							28	36								40		42		32					286
75	Marty Houston																													28		32	14	267
76	Scott Pruett	15													43											18								261
77	Jay Fogleman															11	12					DNQ	DNQ		DNQ		DNQ		DNQ	DNQ				257
78	Scott Wimmer																													DNQ	18	19	43	254
79	Lance Hooper										DNQ	DNQ		43	38	18	DNQ		39															238
80	Elliott Sadler																										32			35		20		228
81	Ted Christopher												29					30													28			228
82	Tony Roper	DNQ	37	DNQ	DNQ	DNQ	DNQ	DNQ	31	24	DNQ	DNQ	DNQ	QL																				213
83	Gus Wasson	DNQ	33	DNQ	DNQ	35	33	Wth																										186
84	Ron Fellows																	**1***																185
85	Jason White															21	28																	179
86	Jack Sprague	25		36				43																										177
87	Butch Leitzinger																	2																175
88	Dave Steele	23	34	DNQ	DNQ	DNQ	QL																											155
89	Geoff Bodine																													14				121
90	Shane Hall	DNQ	DNQ	DNQ	31	DNQ	DNQ										39																	116
91	Jamie McMurray																														36	34		116
92	Curtis Markham											DNQ						17				DNQ										DNQ	DNQ	112
93	Brad Baker								DNQ										DNQ		39		DNQ								33			110
94	Austin Cameron																			38	35													107
95	Matt Hutter	19								43																								106
96	Jeff Fuller							DNQ																	21									100
97	Mario Gosselin																35		DNQ			42												95
98	Mike Bliss							23																										94
99	Mike Olsen												26					42		27														85
100	Randy Tolsma																											28						79
101	Ed Berrier	DNQ																												29				76
102	Boris Said			DNQ							30																							73
103	Steadman Marlin								30																						DNQ			73
104	Ron Young				DNQ				DNQ																DNQ						DNQ		34	61
105	Billy Parker																														35			58
106	Andy Houston																		36															55
107	Scott Gaylord																				37													52
108	Sammy Ragan								DNQ																						37			52
109	Steve Grissom																													37				52
110	Darrell Lanigan													38																				49
111	Mark McFarland																										38						DNQ	49
112	Jim Bown													DNQ															40					43
113	Mark Day						DNQ		40																									43
114	Doug Reid III															41			DNQ			DNQ		DNQ	DNQ									40
115	Jamie Skinner						41																											40
116	David Starr	DNQ								42									DNQ						DNQ									37
117	Ken Schrader																					43												34
118	Kieran Dynes																														43			34
119	Rodney Childers																43																	34
120	Joe Bessey												43																					34
121	Bryan Wall																	26		30														
122	John Preston																	DNQ		31														
123	Jamie Aube																	34																
124	Dennis Demers																	35																
125	C. W. Smith	DNQ																																
126	Greg Sacks	DNQ																																
127	Johnny Benson		DNQ																															
128	Ken Alexander		DNQ									DNQ																						
129	Gary Bradberry				DNQ																													
130	Morgan Shepherd					DNQ																		DNQ										
131	Brad Teague						DNQ																											
132	Tracy Hines						DNQ																											
133	David Keith								DNQ																									
134	Tyler Walker								DNQ																									
135	Joe Buford								DNQ																									
136	Roberto Guerrero										Wth			DNQ																				
137	Stanton Barrett													DNQ												DNQ								
138	R. D. Smith															DNQ																		
139	Forrest Urban Jr.															DNQ							DNQ				DNQ							
140	Richard Jarvis Jr.																DNQ										DNQ				DNQ			
141	Dale Quarterley																	DNQ																
142	Jaime Guerrero																	DNQ																
143	Ted Smokstad																		DNQ															
144	Mel Walen																		DNQ			DNQ	DNQ											
145	Bill Hoff																			DNQ			DNQ				DNQ	Wth						
146	Brendan Gaughan																				DNQ													
147	Brian Tyler																						DNQ											
148	Sammy Sanders																						DNQ								DNQ			
149	Brett Bodine																							DNQ										
150	Wayman Wittman																														DNQ			
151	Rick Carelli																															DNQ		
152	Scott Hansen																		QL															
Pos	Driver	DAY	CAR	LVS	ATL	DAR	BRI	TEX	NSV	TAL	CAL	RCH	NHA	CLT	DOV	SBO	MYB	GLN	MIL	NAZ	PPR	GTY	IRP	MCH	BRI	DAR	RCH	DOV	CLT	CAR	MEM	PHO	HOM	Pts

== Rookie of the Year ==
Kevin Harvick tied for a record three wins and beat out pre-season favorite Ron Hornaday Jr. for the Rookie of the Year award in 2000, despite missing one race. Hornaday, the only rookie candidate to compete in every race, had two wins and a fifth-place points finish. Jimmie Johnson drove for a brand-new team and had a tenth-place points finish, while Jay Sauter had eight top-ten finishes. Michael Ritch struggled with qualifying problems all year, while P. J. Jones, Anthony Lazzaro, Mike Borkowski, and Dave Steele were all open-wheel drivers who were released from their rides early in the season. Mike Stefanik was the only other rookie candidate.

== See also ==
- 2000 NASCAR Winston Cup Series
- 2000 NASCAR Craftsman Truck Series
- 2000 ARCA Bondo/Mar-Hyde Series
- 2000 NASCAR Goody's Dash Series
