= Ken Alexander =

American racing driver (born 1953)

- Born: Kenneth Alexander; January 4, 1953 (age 73); Anderson, South Carolina, U.S.
- Height: 6 ft 1 in (185 cm)
- Weight: 220 lb (100 kg)

NASCAR O'Reilly Auto Parts Series career
- 12 races run over 4 years
- 2002 position: 74th
- Best finish: 58th (2001)
- First race: 2001 Food City 250 (Bristol)
- Last race: 2002 Channellock 250 (Bristol)
Wins	Top tens	Poles
0	0	0
- Statistics up to date as of July 4, 2020.

Kenneth Alexander (born January 4, 1953) is an American stock car racing driver during the 2000s. He competed full-time in the NASCAR Southeast Series and the ASA Series before moving up to race part-time in the NASCAR Busch Series. Alexander is also the owner of A & M Cleaning Products, which made the Greased Lightning degreaser an occasional sponsor for Alexander's NASCAR career.

== Racing career ==
Alexander made eight starts in the Busch Series in 2001 and four starts in 2002. In 2001, he drove seven races for Jay Robinson and one for Tony Hall. Ken Alexander made all his 2002 starts for Hubert Hensley. During the Bristol race in March, Alexander became a major nuisance as he was very slow on the track and caused or got caught up in multiple accidents during the race before finally dropping with ten laps to go, doing major damage to the front of his car and breaking the radiator after running into the back of Stacy Compton in an incident that was caused by Greg Biffle turning Kevin Harvick into the wall; Harvick and Biffle would get into it after the race in what would be one of the most notable fights of the season. The bad race also proved to be Alexander's final NASCAR Busch Series start as he hasn't appeared at another NASCAR sanctioned race since.

== Motorsports career results ==
=== NASCAR ===
(key) (Bold – Pole position awarded by qualifying time. Italics – Pole position earned by points standings or practice time. * – Most laps led.)

==== Busch Series ====
NASCAR Busch Series results
Year	Team	No.	Make	1	2	3	4	5	6	7	8	9	10	11	12	13	14	15	16	17	18	19	20	21	22	23	24	25	26	27	28	29	30	31	32	33	34	NBSC	Pts	Ref
1999	Ken Alexander	03	Chevy	DAY	CAR	LVS	ATL	DAR	TEX	NSV	BRI	TAL	CAL	NHA	RCH	NZH	CLT	DOV	SBO	GLN	MLW	MYB	PPR	GTY	IRP	MCH	BRI	DAR	RCH	DOV; DNQ	CLT	CAR	MEM	PHO	HOM			N/A	0	
2000	Ken Alexander	03	Chevy	DAY	CAR; DNQ	LVS	ATL	DAR	BRI	TEX	NSV	TAL	CAL	RCH; DNQ	NHA	CLT	DOV	SBO	MYB	GLN	MLW	NZH	PPR	GTY	IRP	MCH	BRI	DAR	RCH	DOV	CLT	CAR	MEM	PHO	HOM			N/A	0	
2001	Jay Robinson Racing	49	Pontiac	DAY	CAR	LVS	ATL	DAR	BRI	TEX	NSH	TAL	CAL	RCH	NHA	NZH	CLT	DOV	KEN	MLW	GLN	CHI	GTY	PPR	IRP	MCH	BRI; 43	DAR										58th	461	
2001	Jay Robinson Racing	49	Ford																										RCH; 30		KAN; 37							58th	461	
2001	Jay Robinson Racing	49	Chevy																											DOV; 32			MEM; 30	PHO; 32	CAR; 36	HOM		58th	461	
2001	PRW Racing	77	Ford																													CLT; 41						58th	461	
2002	Hensley Motorsports	63	Chevy	DAY	CAR; 33	LVS; 35	DAR; 29	BRI; 31	TEX	NSH	TAL	CAL	RCH	NHA	NZH	CLT	DOV	NSH	KEN	MLW	DAY	CHI	GTY	PPR	IRP	MCH	BRI	DAR	RCH	DOV	KAN	CLT	MEM	ATL	CAR	PHO	HOM	74th	268	
