= 1995 NAPA 500 =

Auto race held at Atlanta Motor Speedway in 1995

Race details
- Race 31 of 31 in the 1995 NASCAR Winston Cup Series season
- 1995 NAPA 500 program cover
- Date: November 12, 1995
- Official name: NAPA 500
- Location: Atlanta International Raceway, Hampton, Georgia
- Course: Permanent racing facility
- Course length: 1.522 miles (2.449 km)
- Distance: 328 laps, 499.2 mi (803.3 km)
- Weather: Comfortable and sunny with temperatures reaching up to 66 °F (19 °C); wind speeds reaching of 12 miles per hour (19 km/h)
- Average speed: 163.633 mph (263.342 km/h)

Pole position
Driver	Darrell Waltrip	DarWal Inc.
- Time: 29.610

Most laps led
Driver	Dale Earnhardt	Richard Childress Racing
- Laps: 268

Winner
No. 3	Dale Earnhardt	Richard Childress Racing

Television in the United States
- Network: ESPN
- Announcers: Bob Jenkins; Benny Parsons; Ned Jarrett

The 1995 NAPA 500 was a NASCAR racing event that took place on November 12, 1995, at Atlanta Motor Speedway in Hampton, Georgia, United States. It was the final round of the 1995 NASCAR Winston Cup Series and was won by Dale Earnhardt, who also led the most laps, while Jeff Gordon won the championship.

== Background ==
Atlanta Motor Speedway, the race track where the race was held.

Atlanta Motor Speedway is one of ten intermediate to hold NASCAR races. The standard track at Atlanta Motor Speedway is a four-turn quad-oval track that is 1.54 miles (2.48 km) long. The track's turns are banked at twenty-four degrees, while the front stretch, the location of the finish line, and the back stretch are banked at five.

NASCAR banned tinted windshields starting with this race, confiscating any that teams had in the pits before this one. The move to mandate clear windshields was to make it easier for drivers to see through cars ahead of them and see if a driver in front was signaling them for any reason.

Most of the cars entered were Chevrolets and Fords, with a limited number of Pontiacs competing. This was the final career race for owner Alan Dillard Jr., the owner of A.G. Dillard Motorsports. It was also the final career race for long time veteran owner D.K. Ulrich. The 1995 NAPA 500 was also the final race for Bobby Hillin in the #77, Michael Waltrip in the #30, Morgan Shepherd in the #21, Dick Trickle in the #15, Dale Jarrett in the #28, Jeff Burton in the #8, Hut Stricklin in the #26 and Todd Bodine in the #75. Junior Johnson would make his final appearance in this race as a car owner. He sold his #11 team to Brett Bodine during the off-season. Some of the more notable crew chiefs to fully participate in this race were Robin Pemberton, Andy Petree, Donnie Wingo, Cecil Gordon, Ray Evernham, Larry McReynolds, and Tim Brewer. Kenny Bernstein would retire from his career as a NASCAR team owner to spend more time with his family after this race.

Points leader Jeff Gordon was ahead of Dale Earnhardt by 147 points entering the race. To win his eighth Cup championship, Earnhardt had to win the race and lead the most laps during the race to earn the maximum 185 points while Gordon had to finish 42nd (the last-place finish) and not lead a single lap during the race (drivers that lead a lap during a race earn 5 bonus points). If all this occurred, Earnhardt would win the championship by only one point. For Gordon to win his first Cup championship, he had to finish no worse than 41st without leading a single lap during the race. If Gordon led a single lap during the race, he would secure his first championship regardless of where he finished.

== Race report ==
Dale Earnhardt defeated Sterling Marlin by nearly four seconds after 22 lead changes during the event, with a record low of two safety car periods totaling eleven laps. Earnhardt started in 11th place and came back from behind to win this race, which set a new race record for fastest 500-mile Cup race at the circuit in 3 hours, 3 minutes, 3 seconds, with an average speed of 163.633 MPH, a record that still stands after the 2019 season at the circuit. Dale Earnhardt was able to dominate this race, as they set up a very aggressive engine package that would make him untouchable all race long, and the engine held up for the win. The average speed of the race was 163.632 miles per hour or 263.340 kilometres per hour.

Darrell Waltrip scored his 59th pole position with a qualifying time of 29.6099 seconds for an average speed of 185.046 miles per hour or 297.803 kilometres per hour, in what would be the final pole of his illustrious Hall of Fame career. Ken Schrader finished 42nd in this race in a coincidental manner; his engine blew and that happened to be a situation that helped Jeff Gordon clinch his championship, as he was required to finish 41st or better to win. The #26 of Hut Stricklin would be involved in an accident on the third turn. Billy Standridge, Jack Sprague, Mike Wallace, Shane Hall, Delma Cowart, and Eric Smith would fail to qualify for this race. Out of the 42-driver grid, only six of them would not finish the race. All 42 of the qualifying drivers were born in the United States.

Jeff Gordon won the 1995 NASCAR Winston Cup Series championship after finishing in 32nd-place in this race.

== Qualifying ==
Grid	No.	Driver	Manufacturer	Team	Time	Avg. Speed (mph)
1	17	Darrell Waltrip	Chevrolet	DarWal Inc.	29.610	185.046
2	10	Ricky Rudd	Ford	Rudd Performance Motorsports	29.630	184.921
3	43	Bobby Hamilton	Pontiac	Petty Enterprises	29.653	184.777
4	15	Dick Trickle	Ford	Bud Moore Engineering	29.667	184.690
5	98	Jeremy Mayfield	Ford	Cale Yarborough Motorsports	29.672	184.659
6	2	Rusty Wallace	Ford	Penske Racing South	29.717	184.379
7	30	Michael Waltrip	Pontiac	Bahari Racing	29.732	184.286
8	24	Jeff Gordon	Chevrolet	Hendrick Motorsports	29.756	184.138
9	6	Mark Martin	Ford	Roush Racing	29.805	183.835
10	41	Ricky Craven	Chevrolet	Larry Hedrick Motorsports	29.811	183.798
11	3	Dale Earnhardt	Chevrolet	Richard Childress Racing	29.823	183.724
12	5	Terry Labonte	Chevrolet	Hendrick Motorsports	29.849	183.564
13	1	Rick Mast	Ford	Precision Products Racing	29.856	183.521
14	26	Hut Stricklin	Ford	King Racing	29.875	183.404
15	94	Bill Elliott	Ford	Bill Elliott Racing	29.886	183.337
16	7	Geoffrey Bodine	Ford	Geoff Bodine Racing	29.890	183.312
17	16	Ted Musgrave	Ford	Roush Racing	29.909	183.196
18	4	Sterling Marlin	Chevrolet	Morgan–McClure Motorsports	29.929	183.073
19	8	Jeff Burton	Ford	Stavola Brothers Racing	29.930	183.067
20	11	Brett Bodine	Ford	Junior Johnson & Associates	29.931	183.061
21	18	Bobby Labonte	Chevrolet	Joe Gibbs Racing	29.934	183.043
22	37	John Andretti	Ford	Kranefuss-Haas Racing	29.938	183.018
23	31	Gary Bradberry	Chevrolet	A.G. Dillard Motorsports	29.959	182.890
24	12	Derrike Cope	Ford	Bobby Allison Motorsports	29.972	182.811
25	19	Loy Allen, Jr.	Ford	TriStar Motorsports	29.978	182.774
26	88	Ernie Irvan	Ford	Robert Yates Racing	29.983	182.744
27	27	Elton Sawyer	Ford	Junior Johnson & Associates	30.001	182.654
28	87	Joe Nemechek	Chevrolet	NEMCO Motorsports	30.010	182.579
29	71	Dave Marcis	Chevrolet	Marcis Auto Racing	30.018	182.530
30	32	Greg Sacks	Chevrolet	Active Motorsports	30.029	182.464
31	22	Ward Burton	Pontiac	Bill Davis Racing	30.062	182.263
32	25	Ken Schrader	Chevrolet	Hendrick Motorsports	30.065	182.245
33	21	Morgan Shepherd	Ford	Wood Brothers Racing	30.101	182.027
34	58	Jimmy Horton	Chevrolet	Hendrick Motorsports	30.137	181.810
35	77	Bobby Hillin, Jr.	Ford	Jasper Motorsports	30.152	181.719
36	9	Lake Speed	Ford	Melling Racing	30.170	181.611
37	23	Jimmy Spencer	Ford	Travis Carter Enterprises	30.184	181.527
38	28	Dale Jarrett	Ford	Robert Yates Racing	30.225	181.280
Provisionals
39	29	Steve Grissom	Chevrolet	Diamond Ridge Motorsports	30.403	180.219
40	33	Robert Pressley	Chevrolet	Leo Jackson Motorsports	30.346	180.558
41	42	Kyle Petty	Pontiac	Petty Enterprises	30.323	180.695
42	75	Todd Bodine	Ford	Butch Mock Motorsports	30.239	181.196
Failed to qualify
43	66	Billy Standridge	Ford	RaDiUs Motorsports	30.335	180.623
44	44	Jeff Purvis	Chevrolet	Phoenix Racing	30.477	179.781
45	90	Mike Wallace	Ford	Donlavey Racing	30.609	179.006
46	59	Jack Sprague	Chevrolet	Hendrick Motorsports	30.692	178.522
47	40	Shane Hall	Pontiac	Dick Brooks Racing	30.695	178.505
48	0	Delma Cowart	Ford	H. L. Waters Racing	32.068	170.862
49	49	Eric Smith	Ford	Smith Racing	33.200	165.036

== Race results ==
Fin	St	#	Driver	Make	Team	Laps	Led	Status	Pts	Winnings
1	11	3	Dale Earnhardt	Chevrolet	Richard Childress Racing	328	268	running	185	$141,850
2	18	4	Sterling Marlin	Chevrolet	Morgan–McClure Motorsports	328	6	running	175	$58,250
3	6	2	Rusty Wallace	Ford	Penske Racing South	328	0	running	165	$40,300
4	15	94	Bill Elliott	Ford	Bill Elliott Racing	328	17	running	165	$29,700
5	31	22	Ward Burton	Pontiac	Bill Davis Racing	328	0	running	155	$30,000
6	37	23	Jimmy Spencer	Ford	Travis Carter Enterprises	328	0	running	150	$21,025
7	26	88	Ernie Irvan	Ford	Robert Yates Racing	327	0	running	146	$19,955
8	21	18	Bobby Labonte	Chevrolet	Joe Gibbs Racing	327	13	running	147	$27,275
9	35	77	Bobby Hillin, Jr.	Ford	Jasper Motorsports	327	0	running	138	$12,350
10	2	10	Ricky Rudd	Ford	Rudd Performance Motorsports	327	11	running	139	$29,775
11	16	7	Geoffrey Bodine	Ford	Geoff Bodine Racing	327	0	running	130	$26,100
12	7	30	Michael Waltrip	Pontiac	Bahari Racing	326	0	running	127	$20,575
13	12	5	Terry Labonte	Chevrolet	Hendrick Motorsports	326	0	running	124	$25,650
14	28	87	Joe Nemechek	Chevrolet	NEMCO Motorsports	326	0	running	121	$14,825
15	22	37	John Andretti	Ford	Kranefuss-Haas Racing	325	0	running	118	$15,800
16	1	17	Darrell Waltrip	Chevrolet	DarWal Inc.	325	3	running	120	$30,100
17	9	6	Mark Martin	Ford	Roush Racing	325	0	running	112	$23,530
18	5	98	Jeremy Mayfield	Ford	Cale Yarborough Motorsports	325	0	running	109	$13,215
19	36	9	Lake Speed	Ford	Melling Racing	324	0	running	106	$12,775
20	20	11	Brett Bodine	Ford	Junior Johnson & Associates	324	0	running	103	$23,410
21	13	1	Rick Mast	Ford	Precision Products Racing	324	0	running	100	$17,145
22	33	21	Morgan Shepherd	Ford	Wood Brothers Racing	322	0	running	97	$16,730
23	4	15	Dick Trickle	Ford	Bud Moore Engineering	322	0	running	94	$16,415
24	25	19	Loy Allen, Jr.	Ford	TriStar Motorsports	322	0	running	91	$7,730
25	3	43	Bobby Hamilton	Pontiac	Petty Enterprises	321	9	running	93	$11,985
26	34	58	Jeff Purvis	Chevrolet	Hendrick Motorsports	320	0	running	85	$7,370
27	17	16	Ted Musgrave	Ford	Roush Racing	320	0	running	82	$15,555
28	27	27	Elton Sawyer	Ford	Junior Johnson & Associates	318	0	running	79	$15,140
29	23	31	Gary Bradberry	Chevrolet	A.G. Dillard Motorsports	318	0	running	76	$10,280
30	10	41	Ricky Craven	Chevrolet	Larry Hedrick Motorsports	317	0	running	73	$10,105
31	38	28	Dale Jarrett	Ford	Robert Yates Racing	316	0	running	70	$21,340
32	8	24	Jeff Gordon	Chevrolet	Hendrick Motorsports	314	1	running	72	$19,975
33	41	42	Kyle Petty	Pontiac	Petty Enterprises	312	0	running	64	$14,810
34	30	32	Greg Sacks	Chevrolet	Active Motorsports	307	0	running	61	$6,745
35	24	12	Derrike Cope	Ford	Bobby Allison Motorsports	301	0	running	58	$9,680
36	19	8	Jeff Burton	Ford	Stavola Brothers Racing	294	0	running	55	$14,115
37	29	71	Dave Marcis	Chevrolet	Marcis Auto Racing	289	0	engine	52	$6,585
38	14	26	Hut Stricklin	Ford	King Racing	202	0	crash	49	$11,500
39	39	29	Steve Grissom	Chevrolet	Diamond Ridge Motorsports	194	0	transmission	46	$6,500
40	42	75	Todd Bodine	Ford	Butch Mock Motorsports	141	0	engine	43	$11,500
41	40	33	Robert Pressley	Chevrolet	Leo Jackson Motorsports	104	0	engine	40	$12,000
42	32	25	Ken Schrader	Chevrolet	Hendrick Motorsports	92	0	engine	37	$12,500

=== Timeline ===
Section reference:

- Start of race: Darrell Waltrip had the pole position to start the race.
- Lap 2: Ricky Rudd took over the lead from Darrell Waltrip.
- Lap 7: Bobby Hamilton took over the lead from Ricky Rudd.
- Lap 16: Ricky Rudd took over the lead from Bobby Hamilton.
- Lap 18: Dale Earnhardt took over the lead from Ricky Rudd.
- Lap 55: Darrell Waltrip took over the lead from Dale Earnhardt.
- Lap 56: Sterling Marlin took over the lead from Darrell Waltrip.
- Lap 61: Jeff Gordon took over the lead from Sterling Marlin.
- Lap 62: Bill Elliott took over the lead from Jeff Gordon.
- Lap 64: Dale Earnhardt took over the lead from Bill Elliott.
- Lap 72: Caution for debris; ended on lap 77.
- Lap 82: Dale Earnhardt took over the lead from Ricky Rudd.
- Lap 92: Ken Schrader became the last-place finisher due to a faulty engine. Jeff Gordon officially clinches the championship.
- Lap 104: Robert Pressley had problems with his engine, forcing him to end the race early.
- Lap 138: Dale Earnhardt took over the lead from Bobby Labonte.
- Lap 141: Todd Bodine's engine started acting up, ending his NASCAR race weekend prematurely.
- Lap 194: Steve Grissom's transmission stopped working properly, causing him to be the fourth DNF.
- Lap 201: Dale Earnhardt took over the lead from Bobby Labonte.
- Lap 202: Hut Stricklin had a terminal crash.
- Lap 204: Caution due to Hut Stricklin's accident, ended on lap 208.
- Lap 270: Dale Earnhardt took over the lead from Bill Elliott.
- Lap 289: Dave Marcis' engine gave out, making him the 37th-place finisher in the race.
- Finish: Dale Earnhardt was officially declared the winner of the event.

== Standings after the race ==
Pos	Driver	Points	Differential
1	Jeff Gordon	4614	0
2	Dale Earnhardt	4580	-34
3 ▲	Sterling Marlin	4361	-253
4 ▼	Mark Martin	4320	-294
5	Rusty Wallace	4240	-374
6	Terry Labonte	4146	-468
7	Ted Musgrave	3949	-665
8 ▲	Bill Elliott	3746	-868
9 ▼	Ricky Rudd	3734	-880
10	Bobby Labonte	3718	-896

Preceded by 1995 Dura Lube 500	NASCAR Winston Cup Series Season; 1995-96	Succeeded by 1996 Daytona 500
