= NASCAR operations of Chip Ganassi Racing =

NASCAR team

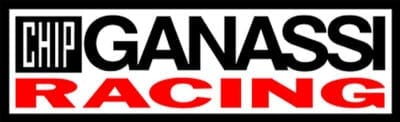

The NASCAR operation of Chip Ganassi Racing was established in 1989 by Cuban-American businessman Felix Sabates. The team was known as SABCO Racing, formed after Sabates purchased an R&D team from Hendrick Motorsports. The team was renamed Team SABCO in 1996. In 2001, Ganassi bought 80% of the ownership interest in the then-two-car team to form Chip Ganassi Racing with Felix Sabates; the same year the team switched from Chevrolet to full-works then-DaimlerChrysler-owned Dodge and received a same partnership treatment as Penske Racing (from 2003), Evernham Motorsports, Bill Davis Racing, Melling Racing and Petty Enterprises teams. In 2009, Ganassi partnered with Dale Earnhardt, Inc. owner Teresa Earnhardt to merge their NASCAR operations into Ganassi's shop and entered under the Earnhardt Ganassi Racing with Felix Sabates banner, while returning to Chevrolet equipment. The NASCAR team dropped the Earnhardt name in 2014, and Ganassi revealed that Teresa was never truly involved with the team. Rob Kauffman, chairman of the Race Team Alliance, purchased a stake in the team in 2015. The NASCAR program has fielded full-time entries for notable drivers including Kyle Petty, Joe Nemechek, Sterling Marlin, Jimmy Spencer, Juan Pablo Montoya, Jamie McMurray, Kyle Larson, Kurt Busch, and Ross Chastain. After already having his name removed from the team previously, at the end of the 2019 season, Sabates announced his retirement as a co-owner from the team, taking effect after the 2020 season.

In June 2021, Ganassi accepted an unsolicited offer from former CGR Xfinity Series driver Justin Marks to sell the entire NASCAR operation to Marks' Trackhouse Racing team, with the deal finalized after that season.

== NASCAR Cup Series ==
On November 12, 2008, Chip Ganassi and Dale Earnhardt, Inc. owner Teresa Earnhardt, widow of seven-time Cup Series champion and DEI namesake Dale Earnhardt, announced that the two teams would merge in time for the 2009 season and run under the name of Earnhardt Ganassi Racing with Felix Sabates (EGR). The Chevrolet equipment of DEI and its engine partnership with Richard Childress Racing (as Earnhardt Childress Racing Technologies) were moved under the Ganassi umbrella, and the new team operated out of the CGR NASCAR shop. The move contracted the two organizations with six collective entries to three Sprint Cup Series teams – the No. 1 Bass Pro Shops car driven by Martin Truex Jr. and the No. 8 car of Aric Almirola from the former DEI stable, and the No. 42 car of Juan Pablo Montoya from Ganassi's stable. The other two DEI cars – the No. 01 and the No. 15 – were disbanded. The No. 41 Ganassi team was planned to continue, but was ultimately shut down when driver Reed Sorenson left for Gillett Evernham Motorsports and when sponsor Target was moved to the No. 42, with the number transferred by NASCAR to Jeremy Mayfield's short-lived owner-driver team. The No. 8 car was also shut down early in the 2009 season.

In 2010 former Ganassi driver Jamie McMurray replaced Martin Truex Jr. in the No. 1 car, making Truex the final driver from the DEI stable to leave. In 2013 Earnhardt Ganassi Racing switched to Hendrick Motorsports engines after four years with Earnhardt-Childress Racing engines. During the five-year tenure of EGR, Teresa Earnhardt had little influence in day-to-day operations of the team, leading Ganassi and Sabates to revert to the team's original name for the 2014 season.

In mid-2015, Rob Kauffman, then co-owner of Michael Waltrip Racing, purchased a stake in the team. Initially expected to absorb one of the two MWR entries, CGR later announced it would remain a two-car operation.

The pit crew department won the 2017 Comcast Community Champion Award in recognition of their charitable work.

== Earnhardt-Ganassi Era ==
=== Car No. 1 history (2009-2021) ===
Note: Before merging with Chip Ganassi Racing, Dale Earnhardt Inc. fielded a No. 1 car through 2008, most notably with Steve Park driving. For more information, see Dale Earnhardt, Inc. This section concerns the lineage of Chip Ganassi Racing's entry that later became the No. 1 after the merger with Dale Earnhardt Inc.

Martin Truex Jr. (2009)

Ganassi would move the Target sponsorship to the No. 42 car to replace Texaco/Havoline for 2009, leaving the No. 41 without a driver or a sponsor. As a result, Ganassi merged his team with the struggling Dale Earnhardt, Inc., and the DEI No. 1 car. DEI's driver (Martin Truex Jr.) and sponsor (Bass Pro Shops) also came over to join Ganassi. Bass Pro Shops, however, reduced its schedule to 20 races. The team also carried its Earnhardt-Childress Engine program over to Ganassi, and switched manufacturers from Dodge to Chevrolet. Truex failed to win a race in his only season driving for Ganassi, and left the team after the season for Michael Waltrip Racing.

Jamie McMurray (2010–2018)

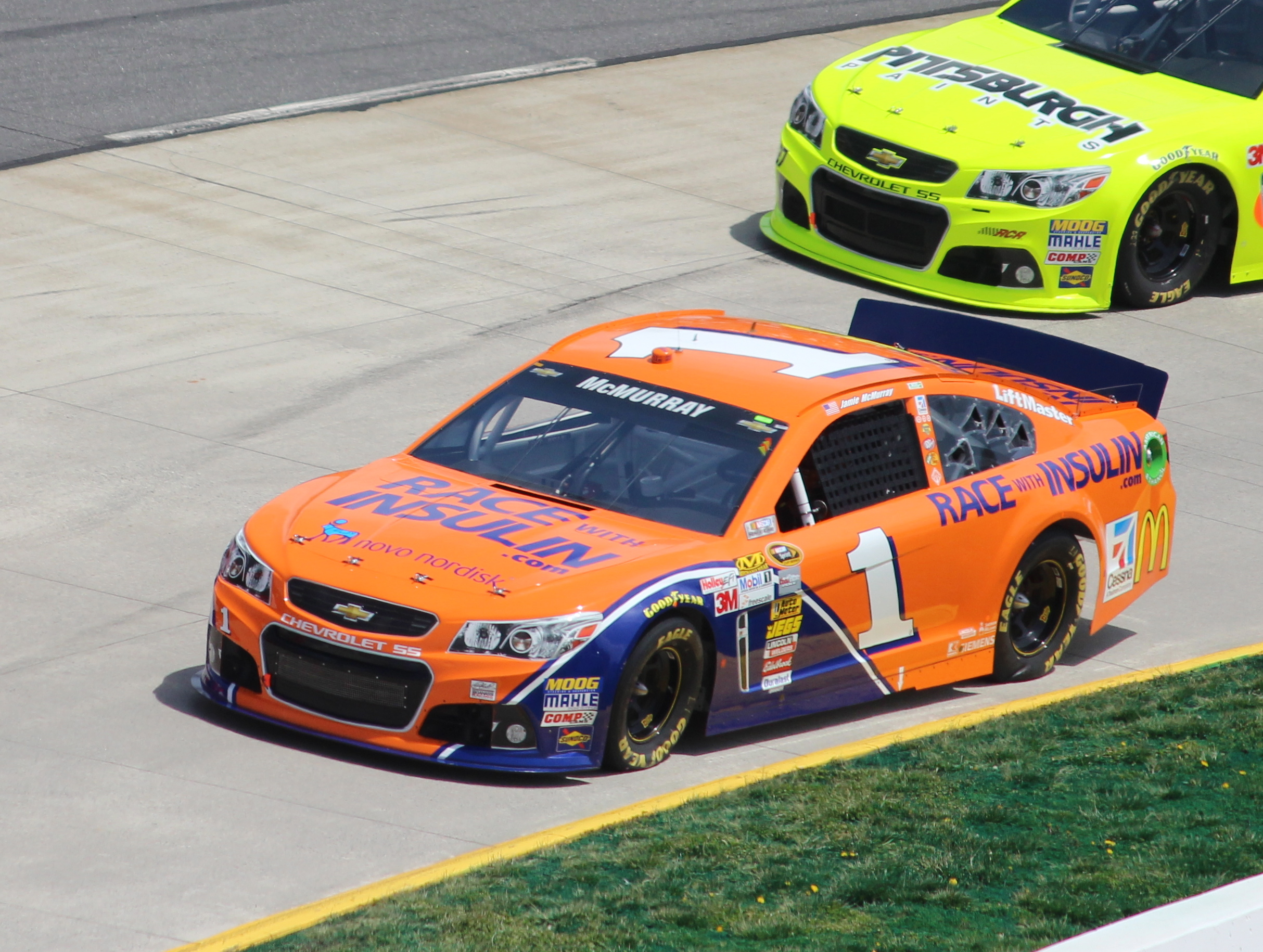
McMurray's No. 1 during the 2013 STP Gas Booster 500.

Truex was replaced by Jamie McMurray, who had previously driven for the Ganassi organization from 2002 until 2005, winning his first Cup race with the team as a substitute driver. Bass Pro Shops was joined by McDonald's as a primary sponsor. McMurray started the year off with a bang, winning the 2010 Daytona 500 for Ganassi in his first race in the No. 1 car. It was the first win for a Ganassi team car since Juan Pablo Montoya won the 2007 Toyota/Save Mart 350. McMurray returned to the winner's circle by winning the Brickyard 400 at Indianapolis, the first time that he had won multiple races in a season since joining the Cup Series full-time in 2003. Inconsistency throughout the season, however, kept McMurray out of the Chase for the Cup. He added a third win at the Bank of America 500 at Charlotte during the Chase, the same race he won for the 40 team in 2002. McMurray earned four poles, nine top fives and twelve top tens to finish 14th in the final standings, his best points finish since his earlier tenure with Ganassi.

McMurray and the Ganassi team struggled in 2011, earning two top fives and four top tens while failing to finish five races, with a dismal 27th-place points finish. The struggles continued in 2012, with only three top tens and a 21st-place points finish. For 2013, CGR would switch to Hendrick engines looking to improve performance. McDonald's would become the main sponsor as Bass Pro Shops scaled down to two races. The team also gained a 10 race sponsorship from the Textron Company, with brands Cessna, Bell Helicopter, Bad Boy Buggies, and E-Z-Go adorning the car. After more struggles in the first half of 2013, McMurray finally broke back into victory lane at the fall Talladega race, his first victory in three seasons. After an improved 15th-place points finish, McMurray would sign a contract extension to return in 2014.

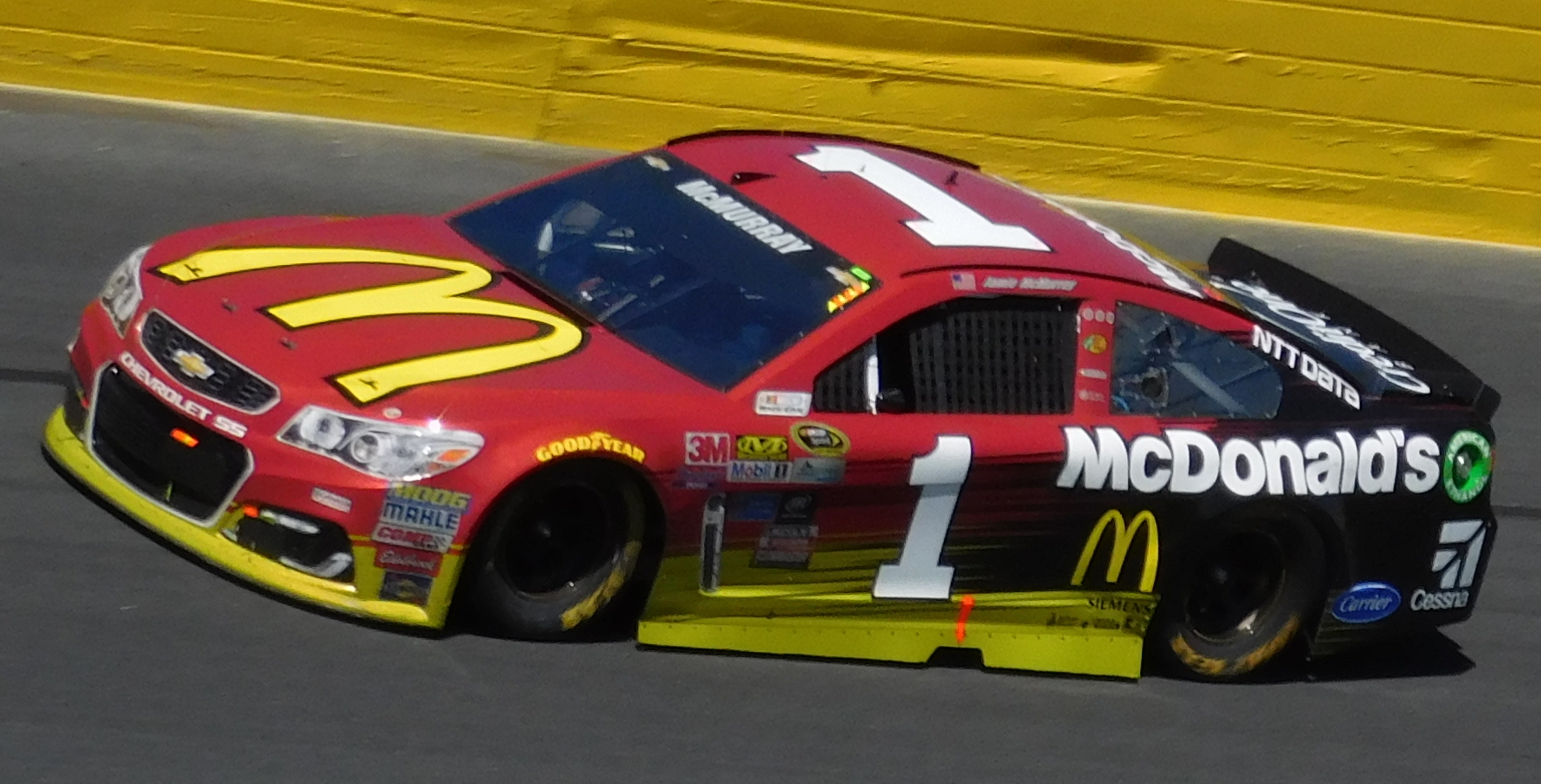
Jamie McMurray in the No. 1 at Charlotte Motor Speedway in 2016

McMurray won the Sprint All-Star Race in 2014, taking two tires under the final caution and passing leader Carl Edwards within the final ten laps to score the victory and the $1 million bonus. However, the team did not win a points race during the season and missed the Chase for the Sprint Cup. Both McMurray and teammate Kyle Larson would rebound after missing the playoff, with the 1 car scoring a pole and four top-fives in the final ten races of the year. Overall, McMurray had seven top fives and 13 top tens to finish 18th in points.

For 2015, former Yates Racing driver Matt McCall was hired as crew chief for McMurray, replacing Keith Rodden. McMurray started 2015 on a high note, climbing to 8th in the standings within the first ten races and making the Chase for the first time in his career, but ended up being eliminated in the first round on a tiebreaker. He finished 13th in points. McMurray would once again be eliminated from championship contention in the first round of the Chase in 2016, following an engine failure at Dover, he finished 13th in points for the 2nd year in a row. In 2017, McMurray scored 17 top 10s, his best number since 2004, advancing to the Chase once again. This time, he was able to make past the first round but was eliminated in the Round of 12 after crashing at Talladega and Kansas. He finished the season 12th in points.

McMurray failed to make the 2018 Playoffs with a string of disappointing finishes, with one top-five and six top-10s during the regular season. A second-place finish at the 2018 Bank of America Roval 400 was the high point of his season. McMurray finished the 2018 season 20th in points. On September 10, 2018, it was announced that McMurray will not return to Chip Ganassi Racing in 2019.

Kurt Busch (2019–2021)

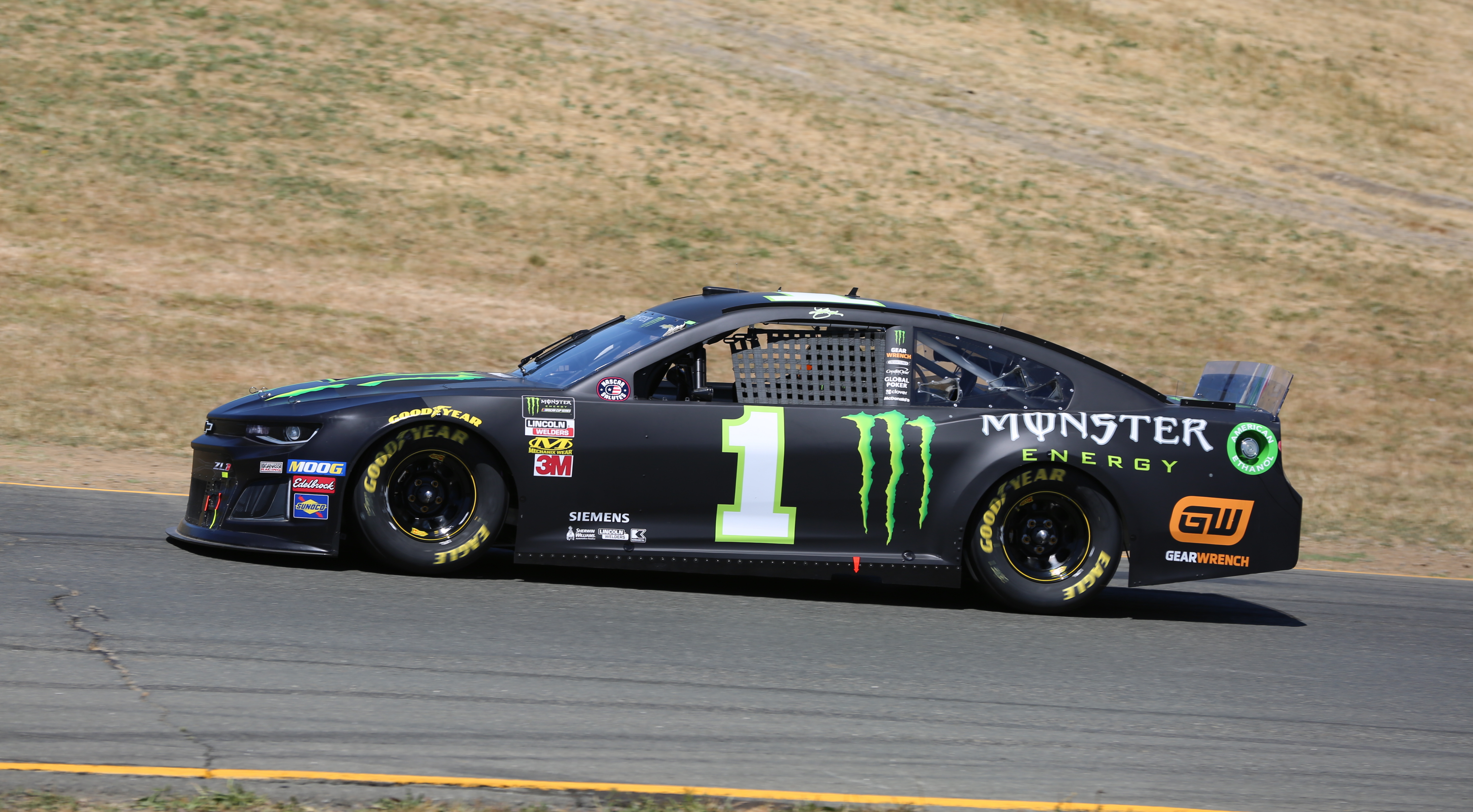
Kurt Busch in the No. 1 at Sonoma Raceway in 2019

On December 4, 2018, it was announced that former Stewart–Haas Racing driver and 2004 NASCAR Nextel Cup Series Champion Kurt Busch, along with sponsor Monster Energy, would move to the No. 1 team in the 2019 season. Busch scored his first win with CGR at Kentucky. On November 2, CGR officially announced that Busch had signed on with the No. 1 team for at least two more years.

Busch managed to make the 2020 playoffs without winning a race by staying consistent with four top-fives and 14 top-10 finishes. He scored his 32nd career win and his first of 2020 at Las Vegas; the win secured him a spot in the Round of 8. He failed to advance to the Championship 4 and finished 10th in the final standings.

In 2021, Busch won at Quaker State 400 on July 11, holding off his younger brother Kyle Busch and locking himself into the playoffs. However, Busch was eliminated from the playoffs following the conclusion of the Round of 16 at Bristol, which also ended Ganassi's final chance at a Cup championship as an owner. After the season concluded when Trackhouse bought the assets to the team, the second team used the number 1, however that team is the old 42 team including driver, crew chief, crew members, and sponsors.

==== Car No. 1 results ====
Year	Driver	No.	Make	1	2	3	4	5	6	7	8	9	10	11	12	13	14	15	16	17	18	19	20	21	22	23	24	25	26	27	28	29	30	31	32	33	34	35	36	Owners	Pts
2009	Martin Truex Jr.	1	Chevy	DAY; 11	CAL; 27	LVS; 32	ATL; 10	BRI; 26	MAR; 29	TEX; 25	PHO; 7	TAL; 33	RCH; 22	DAR; 6	CLT; 23	DOV; 21	POC; 18	MCH; 26	SON; 25	NHA; 37	DAY; 25	CHI; 16	IND; 17	POC; 19	GLN; 28	MCH; 21	BRI; 22	ATL; 26*	RCH; 39	NHA; 19	DOV; 33	KAN; 16	CAL; 22	CLT; 9	MAR; 28	TAL; 31	TEX; 14	PHO; 5	HOM; 9	23rd	3503
2010	Jamie McMurray	1	Chevy	DAY; 1	CAL; 17	LVS; 34	ATL; 29	BRI; 8	MAR; 30	PHO; 24	TEX; 30	TAL; 2	RCH; 19	DAR; 2	DOV; 32	CLT; 2	POC; 36	MCH; 24	SON; 15	NHA; 18	DAY; 39	CHI; 5	IND; 1	POC; 22	GLN; 6	MCH; 20	BRI; 3	ATL; 15	RCH; 17	NHA; 3	DOV; 13	KAN; 11	CAL; 17	CLT; 1	MAR; 11	TAL; 36	TEX; 16	PHO; 10	HOM; 21	14th	4325
2011	Jamie McMurray	1	Chevy	DAY; 18	PHO; 35	LVS; 27	BRI; 21	CAL; 23	MAR; 7	TEX; 22	TAL; 21	RCH; 18	DAR; 9	DOV; 20	CLT; 37	KAN; 29	POC; 33	MCH; 19	SON; 15	DAY; 22	KEN; 36	NHA; 31	IND; 4	POC; 22	GLN; 17	MCH; 23	BRI; 5	ATL; 16	RCH; 14	CHI; 38	NHA; 23	DOV; 15	KAN; 22	CLT; 27	TAL; 29	MAR; 35	TEX; 36	PHO; 17	HOM; 14	27th	795
2012	Jamie McMurray	1	Chevy	DAY; 31	PHO; 37	LVS; 8	BRI; 7	CAL; 32	MAR; 20	TEX; 14	KAN; 14	RCH; 14	TAL; 11	DAR; 34	CLT; 21	DOV; 19	POC; 10	MCH; 14	SON; 19	KEN; 15	DAY; 13	NHA; 20	IND; 22	POC; 17	GLN; 39	MCH; 14	BRI; 17	ATL; 24	RCH; 22	CHI; 21	NHA; 26	DOV; 24	TAL; 34*	CLT; 17	KAN; 15	MAR; 17	TEX; 18	PHO; 23	HOM; 20	21st	868
2013	Jamie McMurray	1	Chevy	DAY; 32	PHO; 22	LVS; 13	BRI; 10	CAL; 19	MAR; 7	TEX; 16	KAN; 7	RCH; 26	TAL; 23	DAR; 16	CLT; 19	DOV; 33	POC; 13	MCH; 33	SON; 25	KEN; 2	DAY; 7	NHA; 12	IND; 15	POC; 16	GLN; 11	MCH; 22	BRI; 19	ATL; 11	RCH; 4	CHI; 19	NHA; 5	DOV; 11	KAN; 16	CLT; 19	TAL; 1	MAR; 10	TEX; 31	PHO; 18	HOM; 30	15th	1007
2014	Jamie McMurray	1	Chevy	DAY; 14	PHO; 10	LVS; 15	BRI; 38	CAL; 6	MAR; 42	TEX; 17	DAR; 16	RCH; 13	TAL; 29	KAN; 39	CLT; 5	DOV; 13	POC; 10	MCH; 12	SON; 4	KEN; 37	DAY; 30	NHA; 16	IND; 20	POC; 7	GLN; 14	MCH; 14	BRI; 8*	ATL; 12	RCH; 4	CHI; 9	NHA; 4	DOV; 22	KAN; 25	CLT; 3	TAL; 35	MAR; 16	TEX; 5	PHO; 14	HOM; 5	18th	1014
2015	Jamie McMurray	1	Chevy	DAY; 27	ATL; 40	LVS; 11	PHO; 2	CAL; 21	MAR; 10	TEX; 6	BRI; 14	RCH; 4	TAL; 11	KAN; 13	CLT; 19	DOV; 7	POC; 7	MCH; 7	SON; 11	DAY; 15	KEN; 14	NHA; 26	IND; 17	POC; 15	GLN; 40	MCH; 16	BRI; 11	DAR; 14	RCH; 13	CHI; 16	NHA; 14	DOV; 4	CLT; 12	KAN; 20	TAL; 39	MAR; 2	TEX; 10	PHO; 15	HOM; 13	13th	2295
2016	Jamie McMurray	1	Chevy	DAY; 17	ATL; 21	LVS; 16	PHO; 16	CAL; 10	MAR; 23	TEX; 13	BRI; 13	RCH; 16	TAL; 4	KAN; 26	DOV; 21	CLT; 19	POC; 17	MCH; 9	SON; 17	DAY; 34	KEN; 7	NHA; 6	IND; 19	POC; 20	GLN; 8	BRI; 8	MCH; 8	DAR; 15	RCH; 7	CHI; 11	NHA; 19	DOV; 40	CLT; 10	KAN; 37	TAL; 19	MAR; 8	TEX; 19	PHO; 11	HOM; 5	13th	2231
2017	Jamie McMurray	1	Chevy	DAY; 28	ATL; 10	LVS; 8	PHO; 15	CAL; 6	MAR; 38	TEX; 7	BRI; 12	RCH; 6	TAL; 2	KAN; 8	CLT; 12	DOV; 7	POC; 37	MCH; 5	SON; 10	DAY; 14	KEN; 7	NHA; 17	IND; 15	POC; 26	GLN; 14	MCH; 9	BRI; 12	DAR; 10	RCH; 14	CHI; 10	NHA; 16	DOV; 9	CLT; 5	TAL; 37	KAN; 34	MAR; 29	TEX; 18	PHO; 6	HOM; 13	12th	2224
2018	Jamie McMurray	1	Chevy	DAY; 16	ATL; 19	LVS; 36	PHO; 26	CAL; 17	MAR; 26	TEX; 3	BRI; 19	RCH; 19	TAL; 28	DOV; 16	KAN; 31	CLT; 6	POC; 15	MCH; 10	SON; 37	CHI; 12	DAY; 30	KEN; 17	NHA; 18	POC; 20	GLN; 7	MCH; 21	BRI; 29	DAR; 9	IND; 7	LVS; 35	RCH; 21	CLT; 2	DOV; 18	TAL; 35	KAN; 17	MAR; 16	TEX; 19	PHO; 6	HOM; 18	20th	683
2019	Kurt Busch	1	Chevy	DAY; 25	ATL; 3	LVS; 5	PHO; 7	CAL; 6	MAR; 12	TEX; 9	BRI; 2	RCH; 11	TAL; 6	DOV; 13	KAN; 7	CLT; 27	POC; 11	MCH; 2	SON; 13	CHI; 13	DAY; 10	KEN; 1	NHA; 18	POC; 27	GLN; 10	MCH; 23	BRI; 9	DAR; 7	IND; 30	LVS; 39	RCH; 18	CLT; 20	DOV; 9	TAL; 28	KAN; 4	MAR; 6	TEX; 9	PHO; 11	HOM; 21	13th	2237
2020	Kurt Busch	1	Chevy	DAY; 33	LVS; 25	CAL; 3	PHO; 6	DAR; 3	DAR; 15	CLT; 7	CLT; 5	BRI; 7	ATL; 6	MAR; 9	HOM; 17	TAL; 9	POC; 18	POC; 13	IND; 13	KEN; 5	TEX; 8	KAN; 9	NHA; 17	MCH; 10	MCH; 10	DAY; 14	DOV; 40	DOV; 13	DAY; 34	DAR; 8	RCH; 13	BRI; 15	LVS; 1	TAL; 32	CLT; 4	KAN; 38	TEX; 7	MAR; 5	PHO; 12	10th	2287
2021	Kurt Busch	1	Chevy	DAY; 22	DAY; 4	HOM; 8	LVS; 19	PHO; 15	ATL; 39	BRI; 16	MAR; 21	RCH; 13	TAL; 35	KAN; 15	DAR; 35	DOV; 13	COA; 27	CLT; 38	SON; 6	NSH; 8	POC; 6	POC; 20	ROA; 4	ATL; 1*	NHA; 16	GLN; 13	IND; 6	MCH; 4	DAY; 12	DAR; 6	RCH; 37	BRI; 19	LVS; 8	TAL; 4	CLT; 25	TEX; 16	KAN; 4	MAR; 7	PHO; 16	11th	2297

=== Car No. 42 history (2002-2021) ===
Jamie McMurray (2003–2005)

Originally the 42 was planned to run the Daytona 500 with Swedish CART driver Kenny Bräck in the car and even completed testing at Daytona, the team never attempted the Daytona 500. The car came back as No. 42 in 2002 at Watkins Glen when Jimmy Spencer attempted but failed to qualify the car while Scott Pruett drove Spencer's normal car, the No. 41. The car was scheduled to run seven more races with Jamie McMurray driving, but when McMurray filled in for Sterling Marlin, the team did not run until 2003. The No. 42 team ran full-time in 2003, with McMurray as the driver and Texaco/Havoline as the sponsor. McMurray won Rookie of the Year honors in the Winston Cup Series. He failed to win a race in 2004, but had a very good season, with 23 Top-10s. He finished 11th in series points, the best of the non-Chasers. In 2005, McMurray missed the Chase after he was passed by Ryan Newman just before the Chase started, and McMurray finished 12th in points.

Casey Mears (2006)

McMurray left after the 2005 season to replace Kurt Busch at Roush Racing. Casey Mears moved over from the No. 41 to take his place during the 2006 season. He finished runner-up at the Daytona 500, but failed to win a race during the season and finished 14th in points. Mears decided to leave Ganassi, moving to Hendrick Motorsports for 2007.

Juan Pablo Montoya (2007–2013)

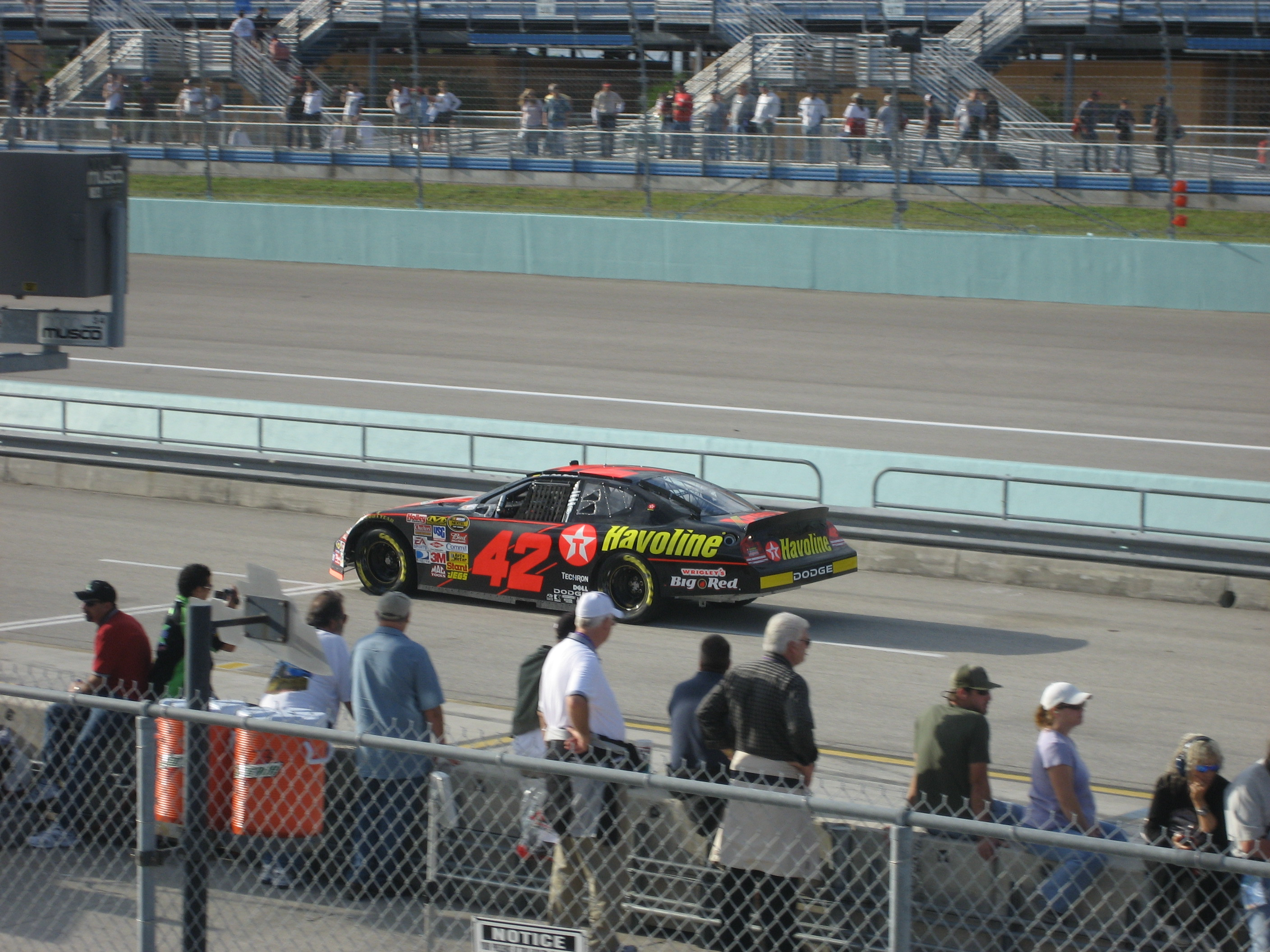
Juan Pablo Montoya in Texaco colors in 2007.

In July 2006, it was announced that former Indianapolis 500 winner, CART Champion, and at-that-time Formula One driver Juan Pablo Montoya would replace Mears in the No. 42 for 2007. Texaco returned to sponsor the car, with additional funding from Wrigley gum brands Big Red and Juicy Fruit. Montoya won his first career Nextel Cup race during his rookie season at Sonoma in the Toyota/Save Mart 350, ending a nearly five-year victory drought the Chip Ganassi Racing organization had since the 2002 UAW-GM Quality 500. He ended the year 20th in points and won Rookie of the Year. After he failed to return to victory lane and dropped to 25th in points despite some good results and a second place in the Aaron's 499 in 2008, Texaco/Havoline left the team.

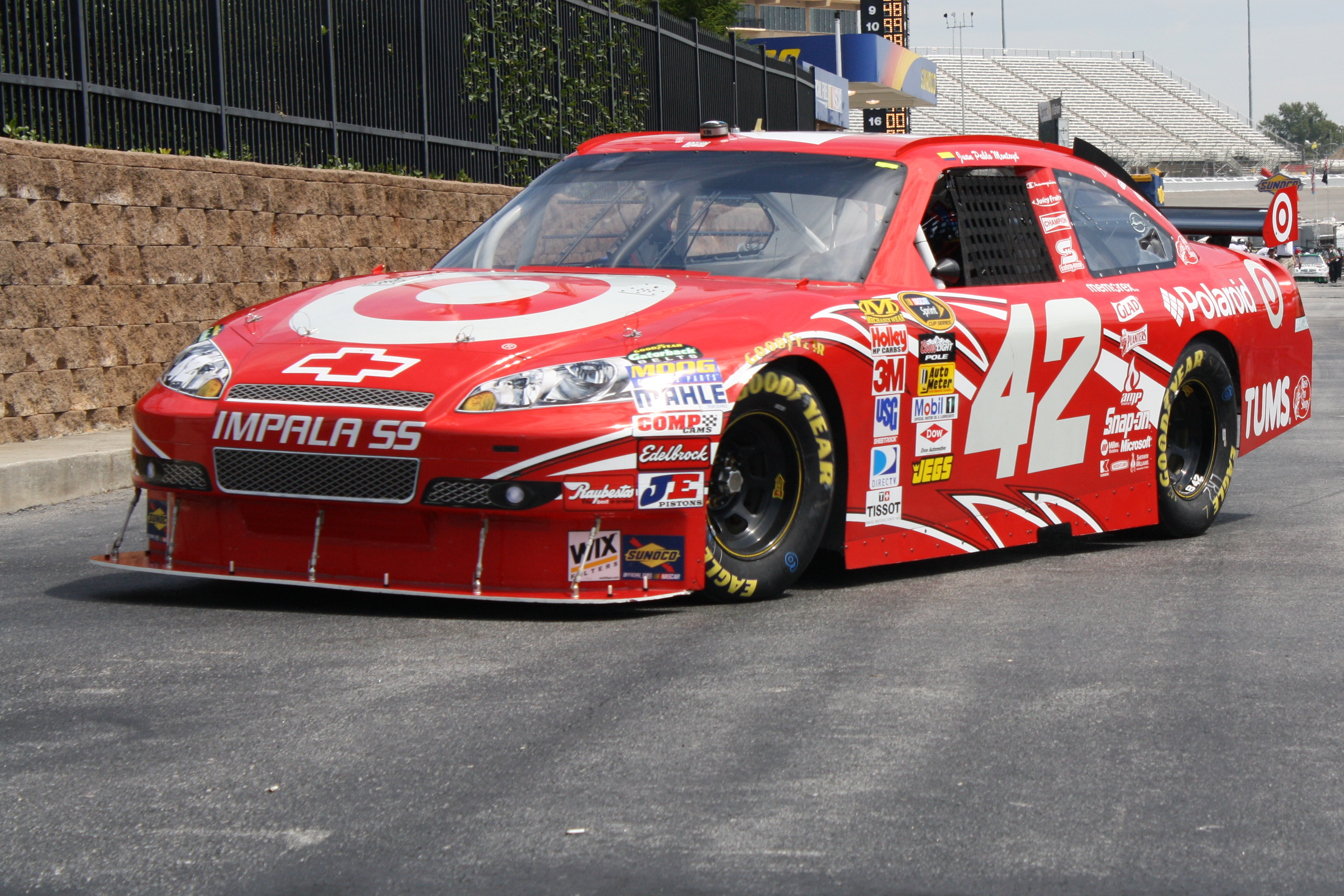
Montoya's Target Corporation scheme in 2009.

With Texaco leaving and the Wrigley Company not able to cover the full season, long-time Ganassi sponsor Target moved over from the No. 41 to the No. 42 for 2009. Upon merging with DEI, the team absorbed the team's Chevrolet equipment after running Dodges since 2001. In 2009, Montoya had a breakout season, with seven top 5s, 18 top 10s, and 2 poles. He qualified for the Chase for the Sprint Cup and finished eighth in the overall standings, the best season-ending points position for Ganassi since Sterling Marlin's third-place finish in the final standings in 2001. Midway through 2010, Montoya had sported great runs but didn't have the finishes to show for it, specifically at the Indianapolis Motor Speedway where Montoya dominated, but his crew chief Brian Pattie called for four tires late in the race, causing Montoya to fall to 8th and never recover. A similar situation happened the following week at Pocono when Montoya was running second at a late stage in the race, and Pattie again called for four tires, placing Montoya back in traffic. Montoya and Pattie were heard arguing over the radio. The next weekend, however, Montoya won his second career race, dominating at Watkins Glen. Montoya ended up placing 17th in the overall standings for 2010.

The 2011 season started fast for the 42 bunch. Montoya posted a 6th in the season opener at Daytona and then finished 3rd at the Las Vegas. At Talladega Montoya was involved in a late crash with the No. 39 car of Ryan Newman. Two weeks later at Richmond, Newman and Montoya were involved in two crashes, relegating them to 20th and 29th-place finishes respectively. At Dover Montoya was running for the lead but after a vibration and a crash involving the No. 27 car of Paul Menard, Montoya finished 32nd. Later at the Toyota/Save Mart 350, Montoya had a great run and looked like he was going to fight Kurt Busch for the lead but crashed in an incident with Brad Keselowski near the end of the race and finished in 22nd. Montoya was inconsistent for the rest of the year except for a 7th-place finish at Watkins Glen on August 14 and a 9th-place finish on August 25 at the Sylvania 300 at New Hampshire.

Montoya's struggles continued through 2012, as the Ganassi program as a whole was looking for answers. In 2013, after Ganassi switched to Hendrick Motorsports engines, Montoya nearly won at Dover, but was passed in the final laps by Tony Stewart, and finished second. Montoya would also have a strong run at Richmond leading several laps, but would again come up short. Later, on August 13, 2013, it was announced that Montoya's contract with Ganassi would not be renewed for the 2014 season.

Kyle Larson (2014–2020)

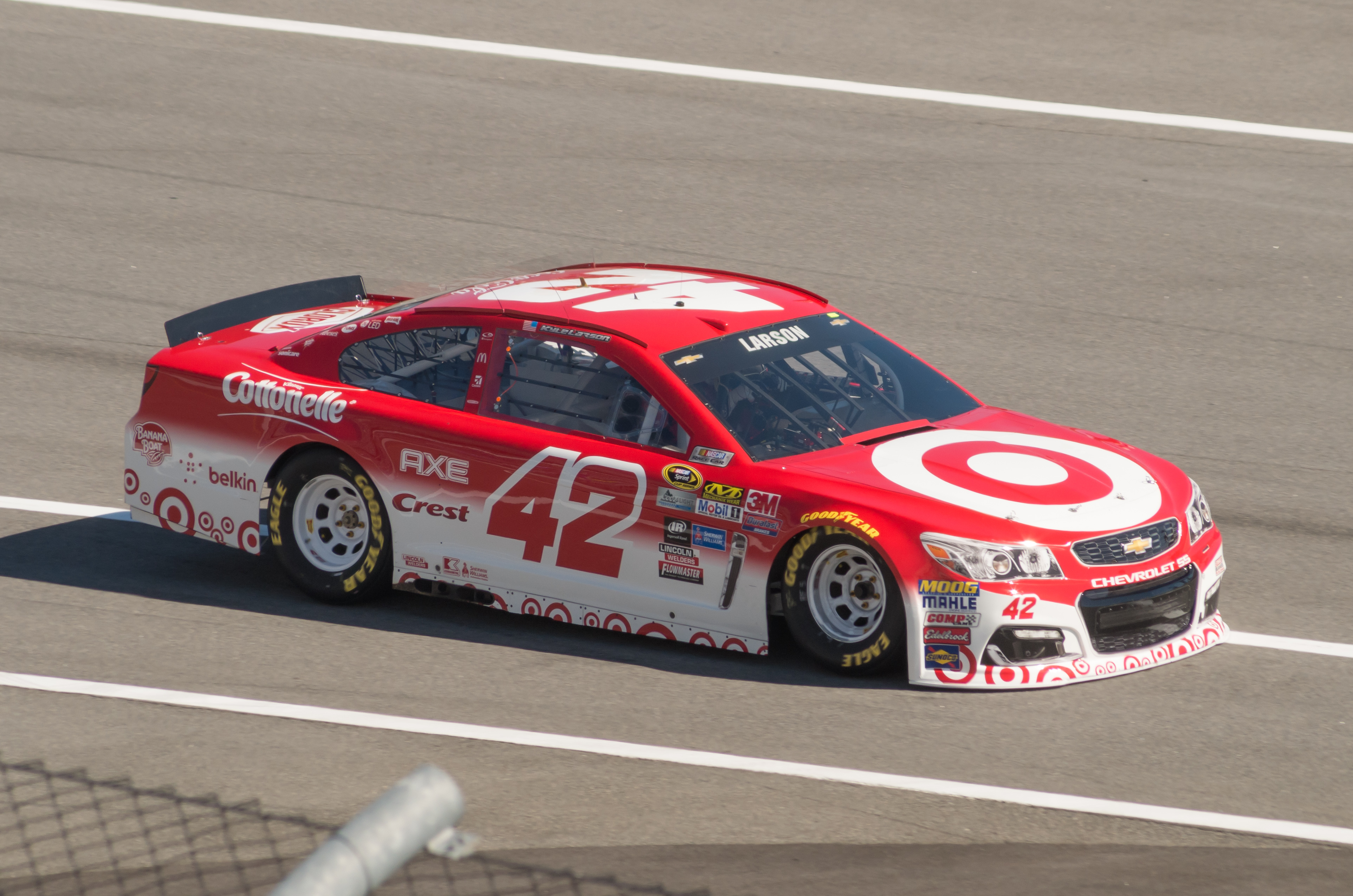
Kyle Larson at Daytona in 2016.

For 2014, promising development driver Kyle Larson took over the No. 42 after winning the 2013 NASCAR Nationwide Series Rookie of the Year. Montoya, meanwhile departed for Chip Ganassi's rival, Team Penske, in the IndyCar Series. For 2014, Larson competed with what many deemed to be the strongest rookie class in the series' history, including 2013 Nationwide Series champion Austin Dillon and several of their former Nationwide Series competitors. Larson nearly won at Fontana, finishing second to Kyle Busch after a late-race restart. Larson defeated Busch the day before to capture the victory in the Nationwide Series race. He had a steady amount of top 10 finishes in the first half of 2014 and finished fourth at his second road course race at Watkins Glen. Larson had numerous crashes and tire failures but won a competitive Rookie of the Year title. He would struggle in 2015, including having to miss the 2015 STP 500 due to dehydration. Larson's best finish that year would be third at the spring Dover race, but he would finish 19th in points. In 2016, Larson would rebound from his sophomore year, taking his first career victory at the 2016 Pure Michigan 400, qualifying him for the Chase for the Sprint Cup. However, both he and teammate McMurray would be eliminated from championship contention after the Citizen Soldier 400.

In 2017, Larson captured his second career victory at Fontana after securing pole position for the race. This completed his first "Weekend Sweep", which is when a driver wins every race run during the weekend. Larson would win three more races that year, sweeping both Michigan races and winning the last race before the playoffs at Richmond. Larson looked like a championship contender for most of the year, staying in the top-three in points from races 3 to 31 of the season. However, an engine failure at Kansas resulted in him being eliminated at the Round of 12 of the Playoffs, the first of four straight DNFs for Larson, relegating him to an eighth-place finish in points.

In 2018, Larson returned with his Credit One Bank/DC Solar Chevrolet Camaro ZL1. Despite being winless, he made the Playoffs by staying consistent in the regular season with four second-place finishes, eight top-fives, and 14 top-10s. Larson had a dominant car at the Inaugural Charlotte Roval race but was caught in a multi-car pileup in a late restart that also involved Playoff contenders Brad Keselowski and Kyle Busch. His heavily damaged No. 42 car took advantage of Jeffrey Earnhardt being spun out by Daniel Hemric on the final lap and limped across the finish line in 25th place, securing him in the top 12. Larson experienced further bad luck at the fall Talladega race when he blew a right-front tire and spun out. He finished 11th in the race but was docked 10 driver and 10 owner points after the team violated the damaged vehicle policy by using metal tabs instead of fasteners and/or tape to repair the torn right front fender. Despite finishing third at the fall Kansas race, Larson was eliminated in the Round of 12 of the Playoffs. He finished the season ninth in points.

During the 2019 season, Larson made history by becoming only the third driver to win the Monster Energy Open and the Monster Energy NASCAR All-Star Race. Larson once again made the Playoffs, his 4th straight appearance. Right after advancing past the Round of 16, Larson broke a 75-race winless streak by winning at Dover after qualifying second, immediately advancing to the Round of 8.

On April 13, 2020, NASCAR and iRacing indefinitely suspended Larson after he used a racial slur during an iRacing event. In a statement posted to Twitter, Chip Ganassi Racing had announced that they had suspended Larson without pay. As a result of his actions, McDonald's, Credit One Bank, Advent Health and Fiserv terminated their sponsorship of Larson. In addition, Chevrolet suspended its relationship with Larson indefinitely. CGR fired Larson the following day.

Matt Kenseth (2020)

On April 27, 2020, it was announced that Matt Kenseth would fill in for the remainder of the season. In addition, NASCAR granted him a waiver for eligibility in the 2020 playoffs. Other than a second-place run in the Brickyard 400, the season was forgettable for the 42 team as Kenseth finished 28th in the final standings with two Top 10's in his 32 races. After the year, Kenseth formally retired from NASCAR and primary sponsor Credit One Bank left the organization.

Ross Chastain (2021)

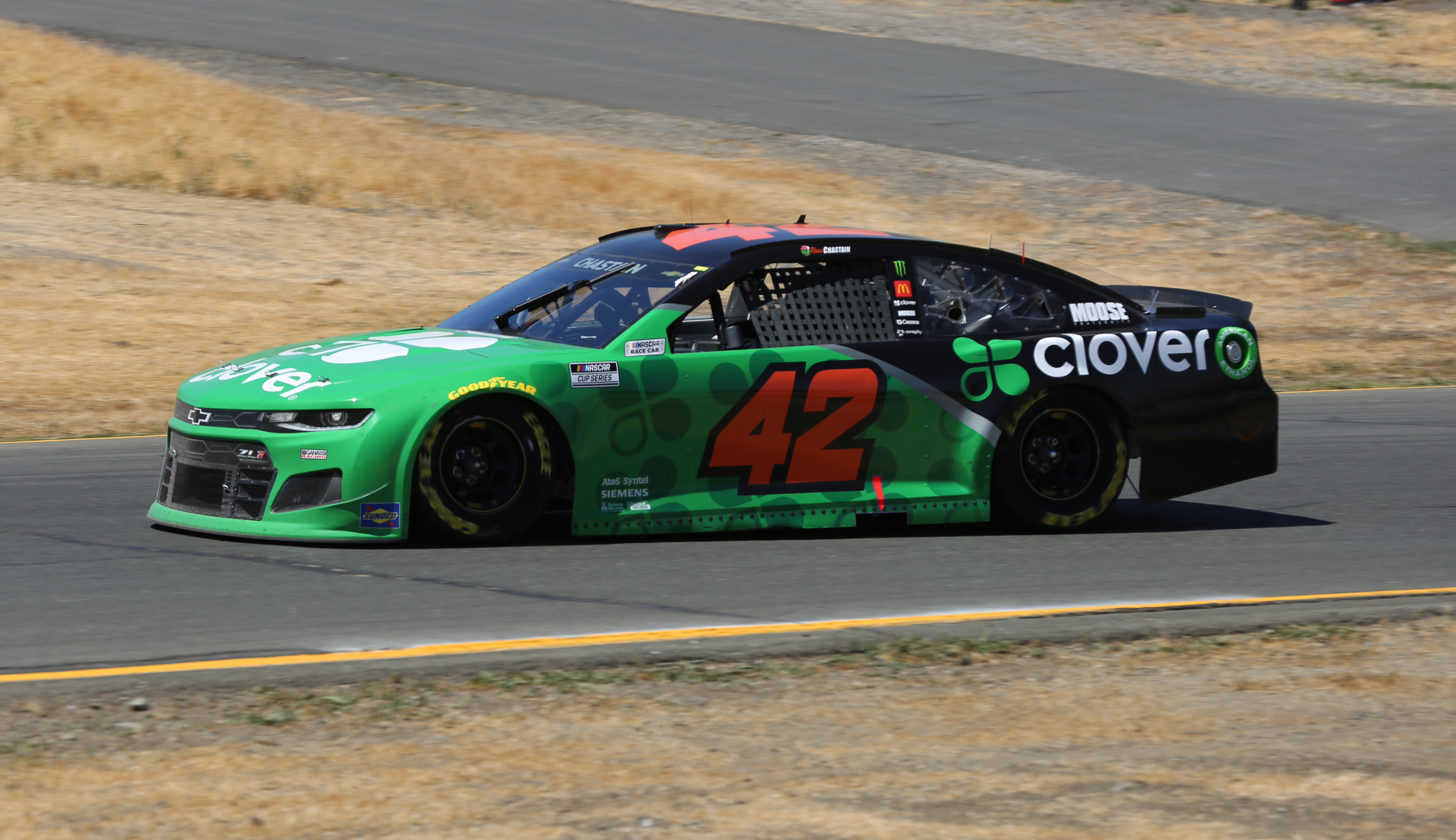
Chastain in the No. 42 at Sonoma Raceway in 2021

On September 21, Chip Ganassi Racing announced that Ross Chastain would replace Kenseth in the No. 42 Chevrolet in 2021. After a few great runs including a third-place finish in the Southern 500 and a second place at the inaugural Ally 400 at Nashville, the team missed the playoffs and finished 20th in points in his first fulltime season as a Cup driver. After the season however, Ganassi sold his assets to Justin Marks and the Trackhouse Racing. After a short decision, the team decided to bring the whole 42 team over including Ross, crew chief Phil Surgen, the crew and sponsors including AdventHealth but the 42 number did not come over as that team now runs as the 1 car. The 42 number however was not out of use long as the Petty GMS Racing team picked up its second car as the 42.

==== Car No. 42 results ====
Year	Driver	No.	Make	1	2	3	4	5	6	7	8	9	10	11	12	13	14	15	16	17	18	19	20	21	22	23	24	25	26	27	28	29	30	31	32	33	34	35	36	Owners	Pts
2002	Jimmy Spencer	42	Dodge	DAY	CAR	LVS	ATL	DAR	BRI	TEX	MAR	TAL	CAL	RCH	CLT	DOV	POC	MCH	SON	DAY	CHI	NHA	POC	IND	GLN; DNQ	MCH	BRI	DAR	RCH	NHA	DOV	KAN	TAL	CLT	MAR	ATL	CAR	PHO	HOM	72nd	22
2003	Jamie McMurray	42	Dodge	DAY; 31	CAR; 5	LVS; 32	ATL; 36	DAR; 22	BRI; 11	TEX; 10	TAL; 27	MAR; 39	CAL; 5	RCH; 22	CLT; 25	DOV; 13	POC; 32	MCH; 14	SON; 20	DAY; 37	CHI; 8	NHA; 40	POC; 28	IND; 3	GLN; 22	MCH; 36	BRI; 3	DAR; 4	RCH; 19	NHA; 10	DOV; 6	TAL; 16	KAN; 8	CLT; 7	MAR; 8	ATL; 15	PHO; 12	CAR; 35	HOM; 9	13th	3965
2004	Jamie McMurray	42	Dodge	DAY; 36	CAR; 3	LVS; 4	ATL; 37	DAR; 21	BRI; 8	TEX; 10	MAR; 7	TAL; 9	CAL; 15	RCH; 38	CLT; 4	DOV; 15	POC; 9	MCH; 37	SON; 2	DAY; 37	CHI; 13	NHA; 7	POC; 30	IND; 7	GLN; 13	MCH; 4	BRI; 7	CAL; 4	RCH; 9	NHA; 5	DOV; 8	TAL; 17	KAN; 7	CLT; 8	MAR; 2	ATL; 8	PHO; 24	DAR; 4	HOM; 7	11th	4597
2005	Jamie McMurray	42	Dodge	DAY; 32	CAL; 4	LVS; 15	ATL; 11	BRI; 24	MAR; 25	TEX; 2	PHO; 25	TAL; 5	DAR; 6	RCH; 10	CLT; 21	DOV; 26	POC; 10	MCH; 13	SON; 13	DAY; 2	CHI; 22	NHA; 40	POC; 11	IND; 17	GLN; 13	MCH; 20	BRI; 26	CAL; 8	RCH; 40	NHA; 12	DOV; 29	TAL; 12	KAN; 18	CLT; 31	MAR; 7	ATL; 6	TEX; 11	PHO; 18	HOM; 18	12th	4130
2006	Casey Mears	42	Dodge	DAY; 2	CAL; 7	LVS; 9	ATL; 21	BRI; 25	MAR; 27	TEX; 14	PHO; 20	TAL; 20	RCH; 17	DAR; 17	CLT; 23	DOV; 21	POC; 43	MCH; 7	SON; 20	DAY; 7	CHI; 25	NHA; 21	POC; 23	IND; 23	GLN; 35	MCH; 16	BRI; 17	CAL; 14	RCH; 11	NHA; 21	DOV; 22	KAN; 2	TAL; 30	CLT; 12	MAR; 6	ATL; 28	TEX; 7	PHO; 26	HOM; 32	14th	3914
2007	Juan Pablo Montoya	42	Dodge	DAY; 19	CAL; 26	LVS; 22	ATL; 5	BRI; 32	MAR; 16	TEX; 8	PHO; 33	TAL; 31	RCH; 26	DAR; 23	CLT; 28	DOV; 31	POC; 20	MCH; 43	SON; 1	NHA; 19	DAY; 32	CHI; 15	IND; 2	POC; 16	GLN; 39	MCH; 26	BRI; 17	CAL; 33	RCH; 41	NHA; 23	DOV; 10	KAN; 28	TAL; 15	CLT; 37	MAR; 8	ATL; 34	TEX; 25	PHO; 17	HOM; 15	20th	3487
2008	Juan Pablo Montoya	42	Dodge	DAY; 32	CAL; 20	LVS; 19	ATL; 16	BRI; 15	MAR; 13	TEX; 19	PHO; 16	TAL; 2	RCH; 32	DAR; 23	CLT; 30	DOV; 12	POC; 38	MCH; 38	SON; 6	NHA; 32	DAY; 38	CHI; 18	IND; 38	POC; 40	GLN; 4	MCH; 25	BRI; 19	CAL; 20	RCH; 31	NHA; 17	DOV; 39	KAN; 20	TAL; 25	CLT; 34	MAR; 14	ATL; 40	TEX; 43	PHO; 17	HOM; 17	25th	3329
2009	Juan Pablo Montoya	42	Chevy	DAY; 14	CAL; 11	LVS; 31	ATL; 27	BRI; 9	MAR; 12	TEX; 7	PHO; 24	TAL; 20	RCH; 10	DAR; 20	CLT; 8	DOV; 30	POC; 8	MCH; 6	SON; 6	NHA; 12	DAY; 9	CHI; 10	IND; 11	POC; 2	GLN; 6	MCH; 19	BRI; 25	ATL; 3	RCH; 19	NHA; 3	DOV; 4	KAN; 4	CAL; 3	CLT; 35	MAR; 3	TAL; 19	TEX; 37	PHO; 8	HOM; 38	8th	6252
2010	Juan Pablo Montoya	42	Chevy	DAY; 10	CAL; 37	LVS; 37	ATL; 3	BRI; 26	MAR; 36	PHO; 5	TEX; 34	TAL; 3	RCH; 6	DAR; 5	DOV; 35	CLT; 38	POC; 8	MCH; 13	SON; 10	NHA; 34	DAY; 27	CHI; 16	IND; 32	POC; 16	GLN; 1	MCH; 7	BRI; 7	ATL; 9	RCH; 7	NHA; 16	DOV; 14	KAN; 29	CAL; 14	CLT; 11	MAR; 19	TAL; 3	TEX; 28	PHO; 16	HOM; 35	17th	4118
2011	Juan Pablo Montoya	42	Chevy	DAY; 6	PHO; 19	LVS; 3	BRI; 24	CAL; 10	MAR; 4	TEX; 13	TAL; 30	RCH; 29	DAR; 23	DOV; 32	CLT; 12	KAN; 17	POC; 7	MCH; 30	SON; 22	DAY; 9	KEN; 15	NHA; 30	IND; 28	POC; 32	GLN; 7	MCH; 25	BRI; 19	ATL; 15	RCH; 15	CHI; 14	NHA; 9	DOV; 22	KAN; 23	CLT; 14	TAL; 23	MAR; 22	TEX; 18	PHO; 15	HOM; 31	21st	932
2012	Juan Pablo Montoya	42	Chevy	DAY; 36	PHO; 11	LVS; 25	BRI; 8	CAL; 17	MAR; 21	TEX; 16	KAN; 12	RCH; 12	TAL; 32	DAR; 24	CLT; 20	DOV; 28	POC; 17	MCH; 8	SON; 34	KEN; 14	DAY; 28	NHA; 25	IND; 21	POC; 20	GLN; 33	MCH; 26	BRI; 13	ATL; 21	RCH; 20	CHI; 23	NHA; 22	DOV; 26	TAL; 38	CLT; 19	KAN; 16	MAR; 20	TEX; 34	PHO; 12	HOM; 28	22nd	810
2013	Juan Pablo Montoya	42	Chevy	DAY; 39	PHO; 12	LVS; 19	BRI; 30	CAL; 38	MAR; 26	TEX; 20	KAN; 27	RCH; 4	TAL; 25	DAR; 8	CLT; 18	DOV; 2	POC; 14	MCH; 20	SON; 34	KEN; 16	DAY; 39	NHA; 24	IND; 9	POC; 28	GLN; 5	MCH; 11	BRI; 3	ATL; 7	RCH; 16	CHI; 32	NHA; 19	DOV; 23	KAN; 18	CLT; 12	TAL; 41	MAR; 13	TEX; 20	PHO; 6	HOM; 18	21st	894
2014	Kyle Larson	42	Chevy	DAY; 38	PHO; 20	LVS; 19	BRI; 10	CAL; 2	MAR; 27	TEX; 5	DAR; 8	RCH; 16	TAL; 9	KAN; 12	CLT; 18	DOV; 11	POC; 5	MCH; 8	SON; 28	KEN; 40	DAY; 36	NHA; 3	IND; 7	POC; 11	GLN; 4	MCH; 43	BRI; 12	ATL; 8	RCH; 11	CHI; 3	NHA; 2	DOV; 6	KAN; 2	CLT; 6	TAL; 17	MAR; 30	TEX; 7	PHO; 13	HOM; 13	17th	1080
2015	Kyle Larson	42	Chevy	DAY; 34	ATL; 26	LVS; 8	PHO; 10	CAL; 26		TEX; 25	BRI; 7	RCH; 12	TAL; 42	KAN; 15	CLT; 25	DOV; 3	POC; 8	MCH; 17	SON; 15	DAY; 39	KEN; 35	NHA; 31	IND; 9	POC; 12	GLN; 12	MCH; 13	BRI; 41	DAR; 10	RCH; 12	CHI; 7	NHA; 17	DOV; 9	CLT; 21	KAN; 29	TAL; 24	MAR; 19	TEX; 37	PHO; 21	HOM; 5	19th	872
2015	Regan Smith	42	Chevy						MAR; 16																															19th	872
2016	Kyle Larson	42	Chevy	DAY; 7	ATL; 26	LVS; 34	PHO; 12	CAL; 39	MAR; 3	TEX; 14	BRI; 35	RCH; 15	TAL; 29	KAN; 35	DOV; 2	CLT; 13	POC; 11	MCH; 3	SON; 12	DAY; 6	KEN; 19	NHA; 17	IND; 5	POC; 6	GLN; 29	BRI; 24	MCH; 1*	DAR; 3	RCH; 2	CHI; 18	NHA; 10	DOV; 25	CLT; 5	KAN; 30	TAL; 6	MAR; 14	TEX; 15	PHO; 3	HOM; 2*	9th	2288
2017	Kyle Larson	42	Chevy	DAY; 12	ATL; 2	LVS; 2	PHO; 2	CAL; 1*	MAR; 17	TEX; 2	BRI; 6*	RCH; 14	TAL; 12	KAN; 6	CLT; 33	DOV; 2*	POC; 7	MCH; 1*	SON; 26	DAY; 29	KEN; 2	NHA; 2	IND; 28	POC; 33	GLN; 23	MCH; 1	BRI; 9	DAR; 14*	RCH; 1	CHI; 5	NHA; 2	DOV; 5	CLT; 10	TAL; 13	KAN; 39	MAR; 37	TEX; 37	PHO; 40	HOM; 3*	8th	2320
2018	Kyle Larson	42	Chevy	DAY; 19	ATL; 9	LVS; 3	PHO; 18	CAL; 2	MAR; 16	TEX; 36	BRI; 2*	RCH; 7	TAL; 40	DOV; 10	KAN; 4*	CLT; 7	POC; 2	MCH; 28	SON; 14	CHI; 2	DAY; 29	KEN; 9	NHA; 12	POC; 23	GLN; 6	MCH; 17	BRI; 2	DAR; 3*	IND; 14	LVS; 2	RCH; 7	CLT; 25*	DOV; 12	TAL; 11	KAN; 3	MAR; 37	TEX; 5	PHO; 3	HOM; 13	9th	2299
2019	Kyle Larson	42	Chevy	DAY; 7	ATL; 12*	LVS; 12	PHO; 6	CAL; 12	MAR; 18	TEX; 39	BRI; 19	RCH; 37	TAL; 24	DOV; 3	KAN; 8	CLT; 33	POC; 26	MCH; 14	SON; 10	CHI; 2	DAY; 20	KEN; 4	NHA; 33	POC; 5	GLN; 8	MCH; 3	BRI; 6	DAR; 2	IND; 33	LVS; 8	RCH; 6	CLT; 13	DOV; 1	TAL; 39	KAN; 14	MAR; 9	TEX; 12	PHO; 4	HOM; 40	6th	2339
2020	Kyle Larson	42	Chevy	DAY; 10	LVS; 9	CAL; 21	PHO; 4																																	22nd	642
2020	Matt Kenseth	42	Chevy					DAR; 10	DAR; 30	CLT; 26	CLT; 23	BRI; 16	ATL; 15	MAR; 23	HOM; 25	TAL; 40	POC; 11	POC; 12	IND; 2	KEN; 25	TEX; 18	KAN; 17	NHA; 37	MCH; 17	MCH; 15	DAY; 26	DOV; 23	DOV; 15	DAY; 28	DAR; 14	RCH; 16	BRI; 14	LVS; 18	TAL; 16	CLT; 34	KAN; 40	TEX; 39	MAR; 14	PHO; 25	22nd	642
2021	Ross Chastain	42	Chevy	DAY; 7	DAY; 39	HOM; 17	LVS; 23	PHO; 19	ATL; 14	BRI; 35	MAR; 17	RCH; 15	TAL; 16	KAN; 14	DAR; 15	DOV; 15	COA; 4	CLT; 37	SON; 7	NSH; 2	POC; 33	POC; 26	ROA; 7	ATL; 21	NHA; 8	GLN; 12	IND; 29	MCH; 35	DAY; 18	DAR; 3	RCH; 7	BRI; 14	LVS; 23	TAL; 33	CLT; 23	TEX; 28	KAN; 13	MAR; 27	PHO; 14	20th	729

=== Aric Almirola and the No. 8 (2009) ===
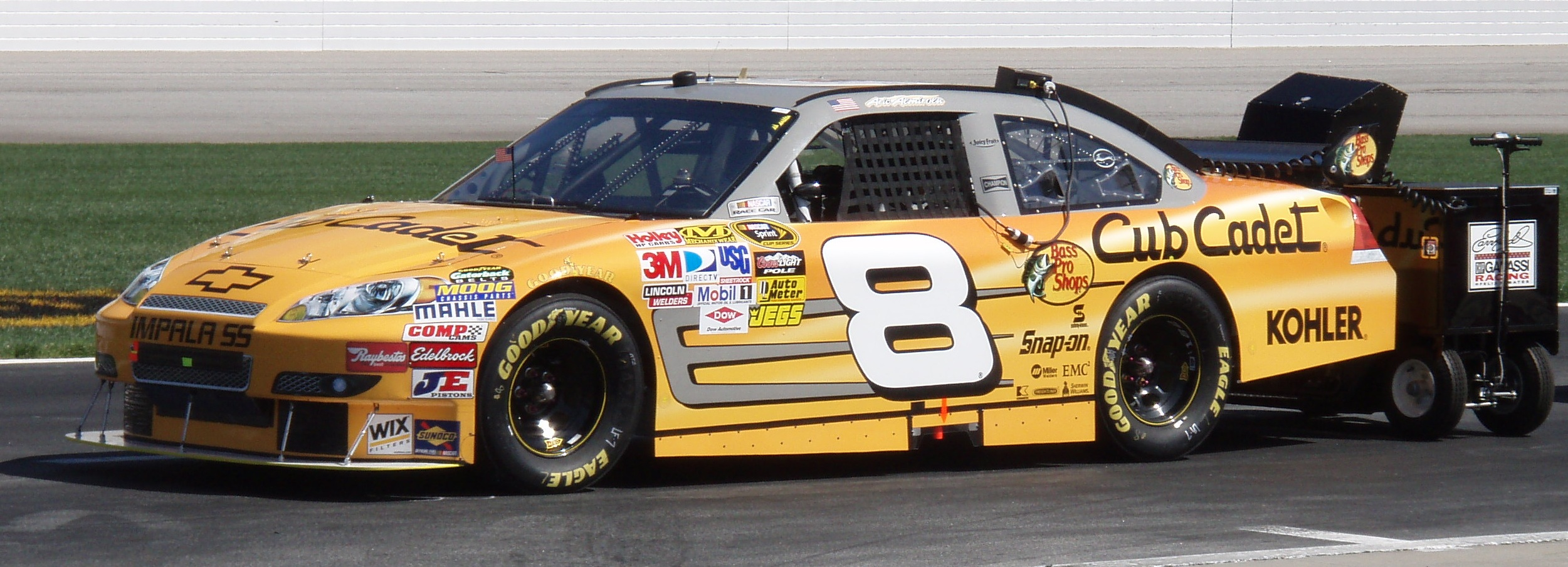
Aric Almirola's No. 8 car in 2009.

After the DEI merger, Ganassi gained a set of owners' points from the former DEI No. 8 car, which had been driven by Mark Martin and Aric Almirola in 2008. (For more information about the No. 8 prior to the merger, including the time during which the car was driven by Dale Earnhardt Jr., see Dale Earnhardt, Inc.). Although Ganassi did not have enough sponsorship to run three cars, and after Bobby Labonte turned down an offer to drive the car, Aric Almirola was tentatively signed to return to the No. 8 Chevrolet for the full 2009 season, pending sponsorship. The team was able to sign Guitar Hero for four races including the Daytona 500, and one-race deals with Cub Cadet, TomTom, and Champion Apparel. After seven races and while sitting 37th in owner points, Ganassi announced that the operations of the No. 8 team were being suspended indefinitely due to lack of sponsorship. Almirola later sued Ganassi for breach of contract, which he alleged promised a full-season ride, and the dispute was settled out of court.

==== Car No. 8 results ====
Year	Driver	No.	Make	1	2	3	4	5	6	7	8	9	10	11	12	13	14	15	16	17	18	19	20	21	22	23	24	25	26	27	28	29	30	31	32	33	34	35	36	Owners	Pts
2009	Aric Almirola	8	Chevy	DAY; 30	CAL; 35	LVS; 39	ATL; 21	BRI; 35	MAR; 37	TEX; 33	PHO	TAL	RCH	DAR	CLT	DOV	POC	MCH	SON	NHA	DAY	CHI	IND	POC	GLN	MCH	BRI	ATL	RCH	NHA	DOV	KAN	CAL	CLT	MAR	TAL	TEX	PHO	HOM	49th	451

=== Alliance with Front Row Motorsports No. 34 (2009) ===
In addition to the No. 8 car, for 2009 EGR formed an alliance with Front Row Motorsports's No. 34 car and driver John Andretti. FRM received the owner points of DEI's former No. 15 car, allowing the team to qualify for the first five races of the season. The teams also formed a technical alliance, with EGR crew chief Steve Lane moving to FRM and the No. 34 fielded as a fourth EGR entry in select races including the Daytona 500.

== Team SABCO era ==
=== Primary Car History ===
==== Original No. 42 (1989-2000) ====
Kyle Petty (1989–1996)

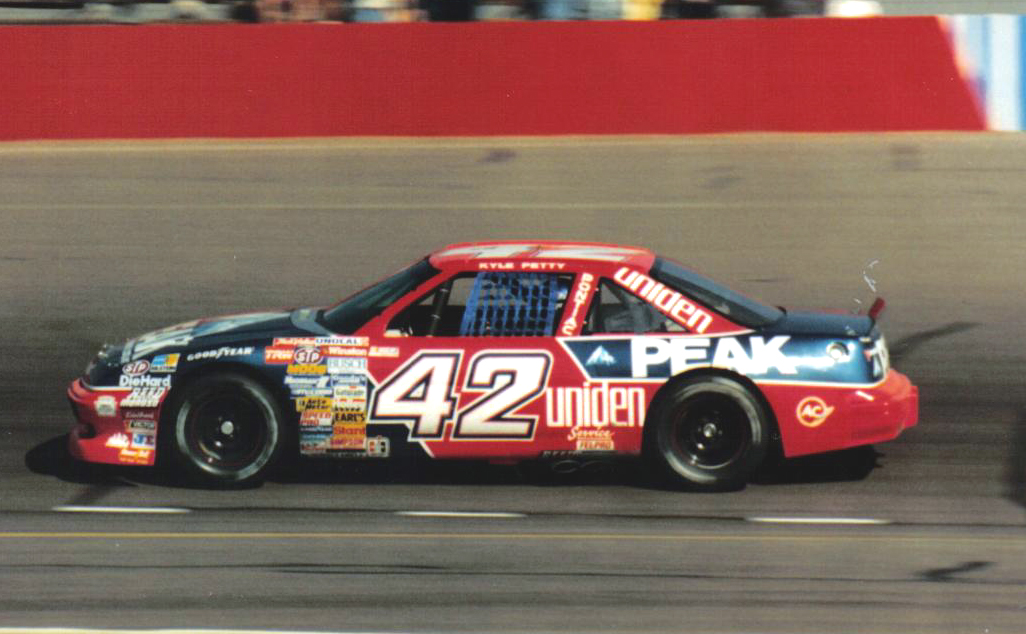
Kyle Petty's No. 42 SABCO Pontiac in 1989.

The No. 42 car debuted in 1989 at Atlanta Motor Speedway, as PEAK-sponsored Pontiac for SABCO Racing, Felix Sabates' race team. The car was driven by Kyle Petty, who finished fourth in the race. The car ran on and off for the rest of the year before moving to full-time status in 1990. Petty scored one victory and finished 11th in points that year. He was running strong in 1991 with a new sponsorship from Mello Yello, before he broke his leg in a crash at Talladega Superspeedway. Over the next 11 races, he was replaced by Bobby Hillin Jr., Tommy Kendall, and Kenny Wallace while recovering. After returning, he won four races finished fifth in points in both 1992 and 1993. After that, Petty's career began to run out of steam. He won his final race in 1995 at Dover, the first year the car had Coors Light as a sponsor. In 1996, Petty was temporarily replaced by Jim Sauter to recover from more injuries.

Joe Nemechek (1997–1999)

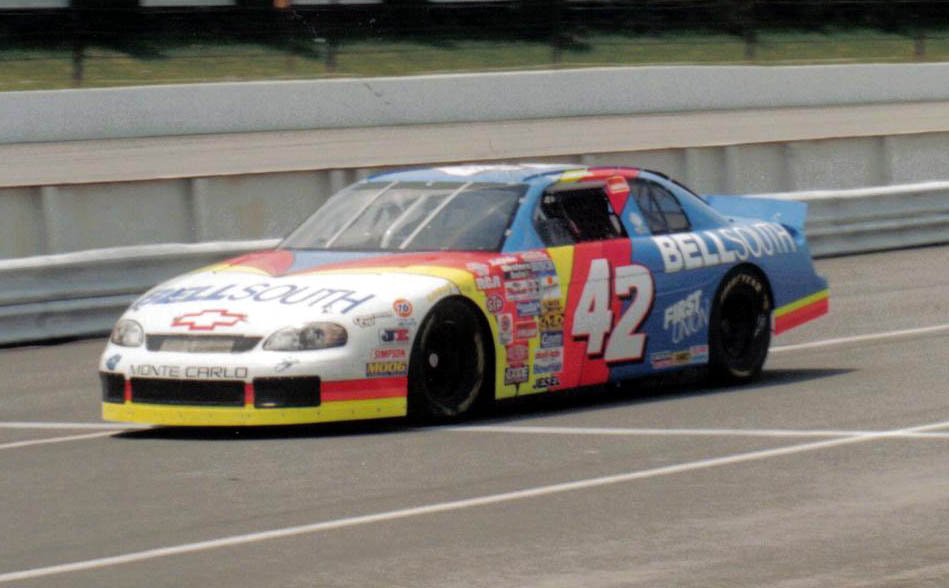
Joe Nemechek in the Team SABCO No. 42 in 1997.

In 1997, Kyle Petty and team owner Sabates split and sponsor Coors Light moved to the No. 40 car. The team switched from Pontiac to Chevy. Joe Nemechek and sponsor BellSouth proceeded to come on board. The year got off to a rocky start when Nemechek did not qualify for the Daytona 500 but was able to get in on a car bought from Phil Barkdoll. After losing his brother John in a crash at Homestead (and missing Darlington to attend his funeral, during which he was replaced by Phil Parsons), Nemechek won two pole positions and finished 28th in points, followed up by a then-career best 26th in 1998. Weeks after announcing that they would not race together after the 1999 season had ended, Nemechek won his first Winston Cup race at New Hampshire International Speedway, and won two more poles. The No. 42 was 87 in 1996.

Kenny Irwin Jr. (2000)

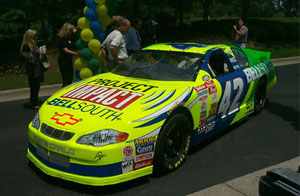
Kenny Irwin Jr.'s BellSouth Chevrolet in 2000.

In 2000, former Winston Cup Rookie of the Year Kenny Irwin Jr. took over the 42 car. He was just adjusting to his new team, scoring a single top ten in the first 17 races, when in July he was killed in an accident at New Hampshire during Cup Series practice, the first race since the team won there the previous year. The team took one week off and returned as the No. 01 driven by Ted Musgrave.

==== Transition to Chip Ganassi Racing, Car No. 01 (2000-2001) ====
Part-time (1999–2000)

In 1999, the team fielded No. 01 and served as the team's research and development car. Jeff Green, Steve Grissom, and Ron Hornaday Jr. drove the car on a limited schedule.

In 2000, The No. 01 replaced the No. 42 after New Hampshire and was driven by Ted Musgrave.

Jason Leffler (2001)

For 2001, Chip Ganassi purchased a majority stake in SABCO, and the BellSouth brand Cingular Wireless became the sponsor. Busch Series driver and former USAC standout Jason Leffler was hired to drive the car, which was now a Dodge. Leffler's rookie season was a struggle, despite winning a pole at the inaugural race at Kansas Speedway. Leffler failed to qualify for four races, and was replaced with Trans-Am Series driver Dorsey Schroeder at Sonoma and Scott Pruett at Watkins Glen. Leffler would fail to qualify for the race at Sonoma in the No. 04 car and he was released at the end of the season.

==== No. 41 history (2002-2008) ====
Jimmy Spencer (2002)

With Cingular moving to Richard Childress Racing to sponsor the No. 31 car, long time Ganassi backer Target became the sponsor of the former 01 team, the number was changed to No. 41, and veteran Jimmy Spencer was tabbed to replace Leffler. Spencer did not qualify for the Daytona 500, and was replaced by road course ringer Scott Pruett at Watkins Glen, with Pruett finishing a strong sixth. The high point of the season was at the Food City 500 at Bristol in the spring, when Spencer and fierce rival Kurt Busch engaged in a heated battle at the end of the race. Busch, on worn tires, would go to victory lane while Spencer scored a season-best second-place finish. In 34 races, Spencer scored two Top 5's and six Top 10 finishes en route to a 27th-place points finish, and was released to make way for Ganassi's Busch driver, Casey Mears.

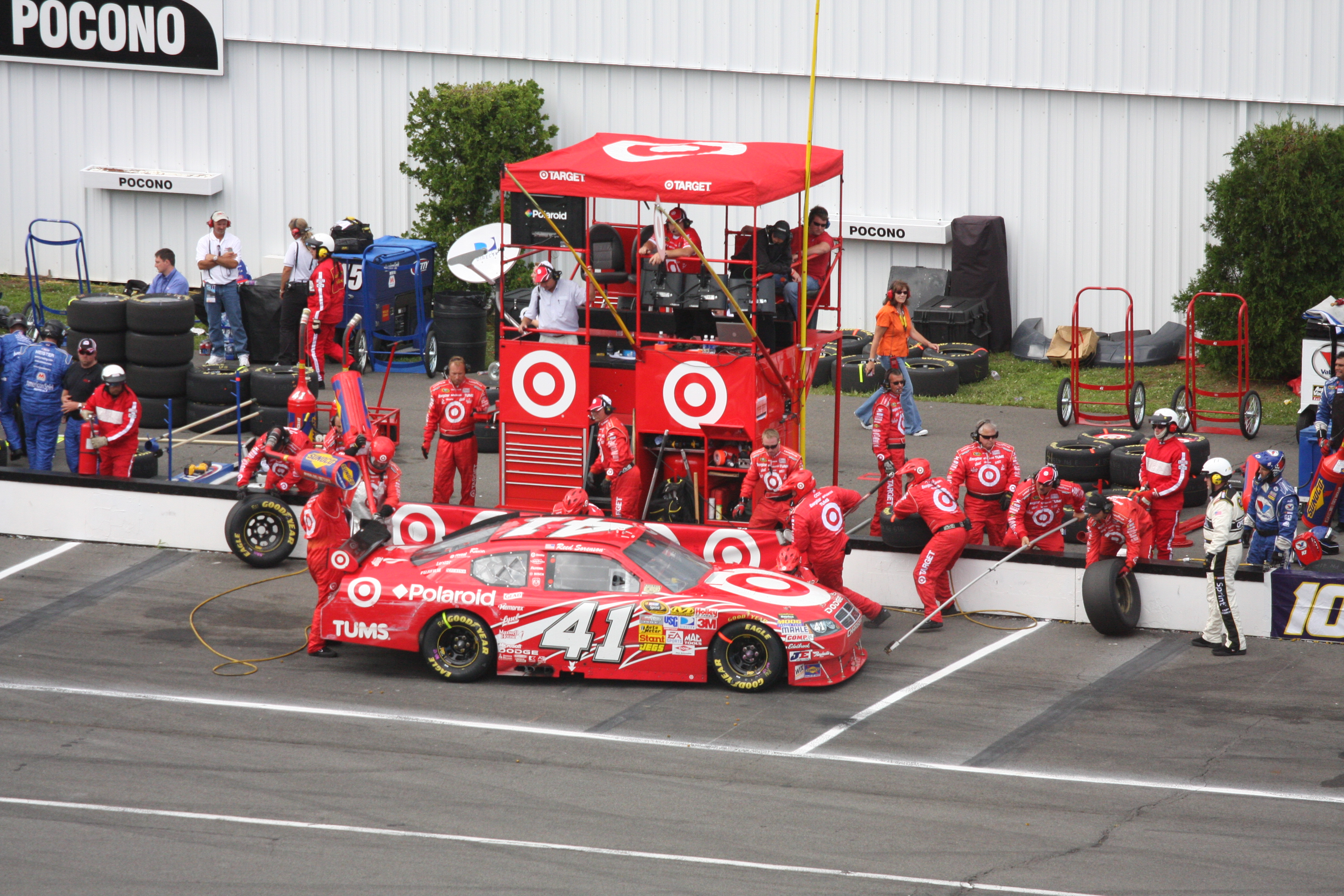
Reed Sorenson in 2008.

Casey Mears (2003–2005)

Busch Series driver Casey Mears was hired to drive the car, joining fellow rookie teammate Jamie McMurray. Mears struggled in his rookie season but steadily improved over the next two seasons.

Reed Sorenson (2006–2008)

For 2006 another young driver, Reed Sorenson was hired to drive the No. 41 car full-time, and Mears replaced McMurray in the No. 42 car. Sorenson had five Top 10's and ended the 2006 season 24th in the standings. After finishing 22nd in the standings with three Top 5's and six Top 10's in 2007, the No. 41 team only managed one Top 5 and two Top 10's and dropped to 32nd in the final standings in 2008. In an effort to keep the car higher in points, Scott Pruett took over at Sonoma, finishing 38th after a late-race wreck. Sorenson left the team to drive for Richard Petty Motorsports.

==== Primary Car results ====
Year	Driver	No.	Make	1	2	3	4	5	6	7	8	9	10	11	12	13	14	15	16	17	18	19	20	21	22	23	24	25	26	27	28	29	30	31	32	33	34	35	36	Owners	Pts
1989	Kyle Petty	42	Pontiac	DAY; DNQ	CAR	ATL; 4	RCH; DNQ	DAR; 28	BRI	NWS	MAR	TAL; 28	CLT	DOV	SON	POC	MCH; 6	DAY; 14	POC; 14	TAL; 7	GLN	MCH; 9	BRI; 27	DAR; 14	RCH; 32	DOV; 11	MAR; 30	CLT; 29	NWS; 31	CAR; 10	PHO; 21	ATL; 6								30th	2099
1990	Kyle Petty	42	Pontiac	DAY; 24	RCH; 11	CAR; 1*	ATL; 6	DAR; 13	BRI; 10	NWS; 10	MAR; 16	TAL; 7	CLT; 17	DOV; 9	SON; 16	POC; 10	MCH; 8	DAY; 10	POC; 35	TAL; 8	GLN; 17	MCH; 16	BRI; 28	DAR; 25	RCH; 6	DOV; 8	MAR; 23	NWS; 10	CLT; 4	CAR; 20*	PHO; 41	ATL; 41								12th	3501
1991	Kyle Petty	42	Pontiac	DAY; 16*	RCH; 25	CAR; 1*	ATL; 39	DAR; 6	BRI; 21	NWS; 18	MAR; 2	TAL; 33												DAR; 22	RCH; 26	DOV; 12	MAR; 12	NWS; 16	CLT; 15	CAR; 9	PHO; 20	ATL; 19								25th	2810
1991	Kenny Wallace	42	Pontiac										CLT; 13	DOV; 26																										25th	2810
1991	Tommy Kendall	42	Pontiac												SON; 18																									25th	2810
1991	Bobby Hillin Jr.	42	Pontiac													POC; 15	MCH; 15	DAY; 15	POC; 28	TAL; 11	GLN; 18	MCH; 33	BRI; 30																	25th	2810
1992	Kyle Petty	42	Pontiac	DAY; 6	CAR; 29	RCH; 20	ATL; 8	DAR; 27	BRI; 19	NWS; 28	MAR; 18	TAL; 10	CLT; 3*	DOV; 29	SON; 12	POC; 6	MCH; 4	DAY; 14	POC; 7	TAL; 6	GLN; 1*	MCH; 6	BRI; 4	DAR; 7	RCH; 12	DOV; 3	MAR; 4	NWS; 3	CLT; 3*	CAR; 1*	PHO; 19	ATL; 16								5th	3945
1993	Kyle Petty	42	Pontiac	DAY; 31	CAR; 32	RCH; 5*	ATL; 7	DAR; 7	BRI; 3	NWS; 2	MAR; 5	TAL; 18	SON; 5	CLT; 14	DOV; 29	POC; 1*	MCH; 12	DAY; 33	NHA; 8	POC; 27	TAL; 4	GLN; 26	MCH; 18	BRI; 30	DAR; 16	RCH; 9	DOV; 14	MAR; 10	NWS; 4	CLT; 7	CAR; 13	PHO; 3	ATL; 11							5th	3860
1994	Kyle Petty	42	Pontiac	DAY; 39	CAR; 8	RCH; 5	ATL; 13	DAR; 11	BRI; 20	NWS; 4	MAR; 26	TAL; 13	SON; 11	CLT; 26	DOV; 11	POC; 12	MCH; 17	DAY; 34	NHA; 8	POC; 27	TAL; 19	IND; 25	GLN; 37	MCH; 6	BRI; 15	DAR; 12	RCH; 38	DOV; 6	MAR; 24	NWS; 26	CLT; 30	CAR; 36	PHO; 6	ATL; 22						16th	3339
1995	Kyle Petty	42	Pontiac	DAY; 12	CAR; 10	RCH; 33	ATL; 14	DAR; 35	BRI; 35	NWS; 31	MAR; 9	TAL; 31	SON; 28	CLT; 29	DOV; 1*	POC; 39	MCH; 42	DAY; 7	NHA; 37	POC; 28	TAL; 6	IND; 25	GLN; 39	MCH; 42	BRI; DNQ	DAR; 24	RCH; 25	DOV; 26	MAR; 11	NWS; 30	CLT; 15	CAR; 32	PHO; 39	ATL; 33						30th	2638
1996	Kyle Petty	42	Pontiac	DAY; 18	CAR; 11	RCH; 20	ATL; 22	DAR; 12	BRI; 15	NWS; 30	MAR; 30	TAL; 18	SON; 30	CLT; 23	DOV; 18	POC; 20	MCH; 38	DAY; 24	NHA; 28	POC; 26	TAL; 12	IND; 38	GLN; 23			DAR; 17	RCH; 18	DOV; 8	MAR; 8	NWS; 31	CLT; 41	CAR; 25	PHO; 29	ATL; DNQ						27th	2696
1996	Jim Sauter	42	Pontiac																					MCH; 21	BRI; 31															27th	2696
1997	Joe Nemechek	42	Chevy	DAY; DNQ	CAR; 35	RCH; 39	ATL; 39		TEX; 29	BRI; 19	MAR; 19	SON; DNQ	TAL; DNQ	CLT; 19	DOV; 15	POC; 36	MCH; 41	CAL; 18	DAY; 24	NHA; 40	POC; 21	IND; 32	GLN; 12	MCH; 27	BRI; 38	DAR; 23	RCH; 6	NHA; 13	DOV; 20	MAR; 25	CLT; 16	TAL; 31	CAR; 10	PHO; 24	ATL; 8					30th	2714
1997	Phil Parsons	42	Chevy					DAR; 31																																30th	2714
1998	Joe Nemechek	42	Chevy	DAY; 26	CAR; 39	LVS; 37	ATL; 35	DAR; 37	BRI; DNQ	TEX; 4	MAR; 24	TAL; 32	CAL; 22	CLT; 6	DOV; 26	RCH; 12	MCH; 9	POC; 35	SON; 25	NHA; 36	POC; 17	IND; 24	GLN; 12	MCH; 12	BRI; 31	NHA; 18	DAR; 35	RCH; 37	DOV; 29	MAR; 40	CLT; 7	TAL; 29	DAY; 17	PHO; 18	CAR; 17	ATL; 40				26th	2897
1999	Joe Nemechek	42	Chevy	DAY; 36	CAR; 24	LVS; 35	ATL; 14	DAR; 19	TEX; 33	BRI; 36	MAR; 37	TAL; 34	CAL; 40	RCH; 6	CLT; 32	DOV; 25	MCH; 34	POC; 42	SON; 19	DAY; 16	NHA; 37	POC; 29	IND; 22	GLN; 30	MCH; 22	BRI; 19	DAR; 6	RCH; 20	NHA; 1	DOV; 35	MAR; 38	CLT; 13	TAL; 30	CAR; 26	PHO; 19	HOM; 21	ATL; 32			30th	2956
2000	Kenny Irwin Jr.	42	Chevy	DAY; 14	CAR; 22	LVS; 24	ATL; 24	DAR; 38	BRI; 40	TEX; 17	MAR; 37	TAL; 4	CAL; 42	RCH; 42	CLT; 24	DOV; 17	MCH; 35	POC; 25	SON; 23	DAY; 22	NHA	POC	IND	GLN	MCH	BRI	DAR	RCH	NHA	DOV	MAR	CLT	TAL	CAR	PHO	HOM	ATL			28th	2815
2000	Ted Musgrave	01	Dodge	DAY	CAR	LVS	ATL	DAR	BRI	TEX	MAR	TAL	CAL	RCH	CLT	DOV	MCH	POC	SON	DAY	NHA	POC; 16	IND; 24		MCH; 26	BRI; 17	DAR; 13	RCH; 21	NHA; 14	DOV; 23	MAR; 21	CLT; 29	TAL; 32	CAR; DNQ	PHO; 25	HOM; DNQ				28th	2815
2000	P. J. Jones	01	Dodge																					GLN; 21																28th	2815
2000	Bobby Hamilton Jr.	01	Dodge																																		ATL; 31			28th	2815
2001	Jason Leffler	01	Dodge	DAY; 34	CAR; 33	LVS; 28	ATL; 32	DAR; 39	BRI; DNQ	TEX; 17	MAR; DNQ	TAL; 20	CAL; 18	RCH; 26	CLT; 30	DOV; 13	MCH; 19	POC; 41		DAY; 24	CHI; 24	NHA; 27	POC; 21	IND; 26		MCH; 24	BRI; 30	DAR; 43	RCH; 28	DOV; DNQ	KAN; 28	CLT; 43	MAR; 37	TAL; 15	PHO; 41	CAR; 30	HOM; 10	ATL; DNQ	NHA; 30	37th	2413
2001	Dorsey Schroeder	01	Dodge																SON; 25																					37th	2413
2001	Scott Pruett	01	Dodge																						GLN; 11															37th	2413
2002	Jimmy Spencer	41	Dodge	DAY; DNQ	CAR; 20	LVS; 10	ATL; 26	DAR; 37	BRI; 2	TEX; 8	MAR; 21	TAL; 17	CAL; 27	RCH; 10	CLT; 25	DOV; 23	POC; 21	MCH; 28	SON; 36	DAY; 4	CHI; 32	NHA; 11	POC; 32	IND; 31		MCH; 34	BRI; 8	DAR; 18	RCH; 42	NHA; 15	DOV; 35	KAN; 24	TAL; 21	CLT; 32	MAR; 24	ATL; 30	CAR; 31	PHO; 23	HOM; 42	27th	3187
2002	Scott Pruett	41	Dodge																						GLN; 6															27th	3187
2003	Casey Mears	41	Dodge	DAY; 27	CAR; 30	LVS; 15	ATL; 23	DAR; 34	BRI; 32	TEX; 27	TAL; 40	MAR; 36	CAL; 34	RCH; 28	CLT; 35	DOV; 40	POC; 21	MCH; 20	SON; 26	DAY; 25	CHI; 34	NHA; 16	POC; 35	IND; 29	GLN; 32	MCH; 41	BRI; 21	DAR; 35	RCH; 41	NHA; 17	DOV; 36	TAL; 37	KAN; 24	CLT; 42	MAR; 17	ATL; 28	PHO; 42	CAR; 33	HOM; 27	35th	2638
2004	Casey Mears	41	Dodge	DAY; 14	CAR; 21	LVS; 7	ATL; 34	DAR; 15	BRI; 36	TEX; 7	MAR; 37	TAL; 8	CAL; 8	RCH; 32	CLT; 7	DOV; 28	POC; 10	MCH; 31	SON; 7	DAY; 11	CHI; 15	NHA; 26	POC; 18	IND; 26	GLN; 4	MCH; 20	BRI; 30	CAL; 29	RCH; 35	NHA; 29	DOV; 24	TAL; 8	KAN; 31	CLT; 20	MAR; 29	ATL; 13	PHO; 34	DAR; 26	HOM; 26	22nd	3690
2005	Casey Mears	41	Dodge	DAY; 26	CAL; 22	LVS; 7	ATL; 19	BRI; 43	MAR; 17	TEX; 4	PHO; 39	TAL; 14	DAR; 39	RCH; 28	CLT; 34	DOV; 24	POC; 18	MCH; 21	SON; 20	DAY; 43	CHI; 9	NHA; 33	POC; 21	IND; 6	GLN; 23	MCH; 14	BRI; 34	CAL; 32	RCH; 23	NHA; 23	DOV; 10	TAL; 38	KAN; 8	CLT; 6	MAR; 22	ATL; 21	TEX; 4	PHO; 22	HOM; 5	22nd	3637
2006	Reed Sorenson	41	Dodge	DAY; 29	CAL; 21	LVS; 40	ATL; 10	BRI; 22	MAR; 12	TEX; 13	PHO; 40	TAL; 26	RCH; 23	DAR; 11	CLT; 10	DOV; 19	POC; 36	MCH; 5	SON; 29	DAY; 34	CHI; 7	NHA; 24	POC; 26	IND; 30	GLN; 12	MCH; 8	BRI; 36	CAL; 21	RCH; 14	NHA; 17	DOV; 11	KAN; 43	TAL; 39	CLT; 36	MAR; 35	ATL; 29	TEX; 17	PHO; 29	HOM; 16	24th	3434
2007	Reed Sorenson	41	Dodge	DAY; 13	CAL; 43	LVS; 31	ATL; 9	BRI; 43	MAR; 18	TEX; 40	PHO; 15	TAL; 25	RCH; 21	DAR; 40	CLT; 4	DOV; 27	POC; 24	MCH; 23	SON; 40	NHA; 26	DAY; 42	CHI; 12	IND; 5	POC; 28	GLN; 28	MCH; 38	BRI; 15	CAL; 21	RCH; 32	NHA; 14	DOV; 30	KAN; 7	TAL; 10	CLT; 30	MAR; 41	ATL; 3	TEX; 40	PHO; 19	HOM; 22	22nd	3275
2008	Reed Sorenson	41	Dodge	DAY; 5	CAL; 37	LVS; 18	ATL; 31	BRI; 31	MAR; 36	TEX; 24	PHO; 42	TAL; 43	RCH; 12	DAR; 32	CLT; 22	DOV; 26	POC; 33	MCH; 34		NHA; 6	DAY; 22	CHI; 31	IND; 17	POC; 35	GLN; 31	MCH; 33	BRI; 36	CAL; 27	RCH; 26	NHA; 22	DOV; 30	KAN; 26	TAL; 23	CLT; 15	MAR; 35	ATL; 39	TEX; 37	PHO; 31	HOM; 31	32nd	2795
2008	Scott Pruett	41	Dodge																SON; 38																					32nd	2795

=== Secdondary Car history ===
==== Car No.40 (1993-2008) ====
Kenny Wallace (1993)

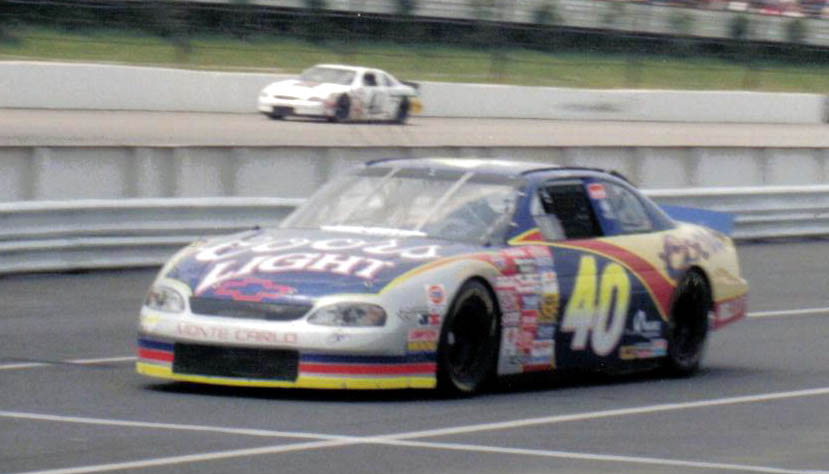
Greg Sacks in 1997 for SABCO

The No. 40 car debuted in 1993 as the second car in the SABCO stable. It had sponsorship from Dirt Devil and was piloted by rookie driver Kenny Wallace. After Wallace finished 3rd behind Bobby Labonte and Jeff Gordon in the NASCAR Rookie of the Year standings, he was released at the end of the season.

Multiple Drivers (1994–1997)

Bobby Hamilton drove the car the next season with sponsorship from Kendall Motor Oil, during which the No. 40 car was bought by Dick Brooks. Hamilton finished 23rd in points that year.

The 1995 season saw multiple drivers such as Rich Bickle, Greg Sacks, and Shane Hall pilot the car. But at the end of the season, Brooks closed up shop and sold the team back to Sabates. The team came back in the 1996 season with First Union sponsoring the car and Greg Sacks, Jay Sauter, and Robby Gordon in select events

The team returned for 1997 full-time with rookie driver Robby Gordon, Coors Light moving over from the No. 42, and the team switching from Pontiac to Chevrolet. Gordon won the pole at the spring Atlanta race. Unfortunately, open-wheel ace Gordon suffered burns during the Indianapolis 500. By the time he returned, the damage was done and despite picking up a Top 5 finish at Watkins Glen, Gordon was released. Sabates later said in a 2007 interview that hiring Robby Gordon was "a mistake", while Gordon said that his departure stemmed from Sabates focusing more on making money than improving the team. Sacks returned to finish out the year.

Sterling Marlin (1998–2005)

For the 1998 season, Sabates chose a more experienced driver in 2-time Daytona 500 winner Sterling Marlin. Marlin did not qualify at the spring Atlanta race—one year after the team won the pole position there, marking the first time since 1986 that Marlin missed a race. At the end of the year, Marlin had six top-10 finishes and ended up 13th in the points standings. Marlin showed a brief resurgence in the 1999 season when he won the pole at Pocono. The next year, Marlin placed runner-up to Jeff Gordon at Sonoma, which was his best finish of the season.

In 2001, the car got a new silver-red paint scheme, a manufacturer switch to Dodge, a new crew chief in Lee McCall, and a new owner in Ganassi. Marlin won his qualifying race for the Daytona 500. On the last lap of the 500, Marlin was involved in the crash that killed Dale Earnhardt. Many fans sent misguided hate mail and death threats to Marlin and his wife, blaming him for Earnhardt's death. Earnhardt's drivers Dale Earnhardt Jr. and Michael Waltrip came to Marlin's defense, and Marlin was cleared of any responsibility by NASCAR's investigation into the crash.

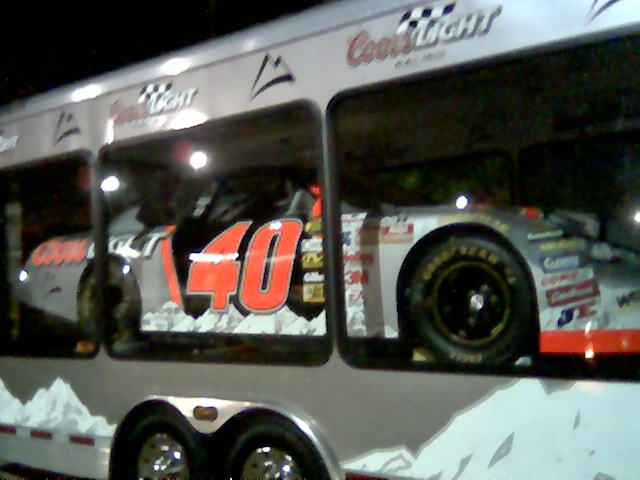
The No. 40 car in 2006, in the silver Coors Light paint scheme

Marlin was able to rise above the controversy, and gave Dodge its first win since its return to NASCAR at Michigan, won again at the UAW-GM Quality 500, and finished 3rd in points, well ahead of the factory-backed Dodges from Evernham Motorsports. Marlin led the points standings for most of the 2002 season and won two races, but he suffered a fractured vertebra in a crash at Kansas Speedway, which ended his season. Some say that Marlin's injury signified the beginning of the struggles for the team. Jamie McMurray, who was scheduled to drive the No. 42 car the following season, filled in for Marlin in six races, with Mike Bliss running the car at Martinsville. At Charlotte, McMurray beat out Bobby Labonte to win his 1st race in just his 2nd Winston Cup start. This emotional victory was capped off with a phone call from Marlin through the television network congratulating McMurray on his victory. Marlin would go winless over the next three seasons, with a best finish of 18th in points in 2003 and was released after 2005.

David Stremme (2006–2007)

Rookie David Stremme replaced Marlin in the 2006 season. This move outraged some fans, since Coors Light and Ganassi both stated that the decision was partly due to Coors Light attempting to target the younger demographic. A new primary sponsor, Lone Star Steakhouse & Saloon, joined the team and split time with Coors. Stremme did not finish higher than 11th, with an average finish of 26th, and had a 33rd-place finish in the points.

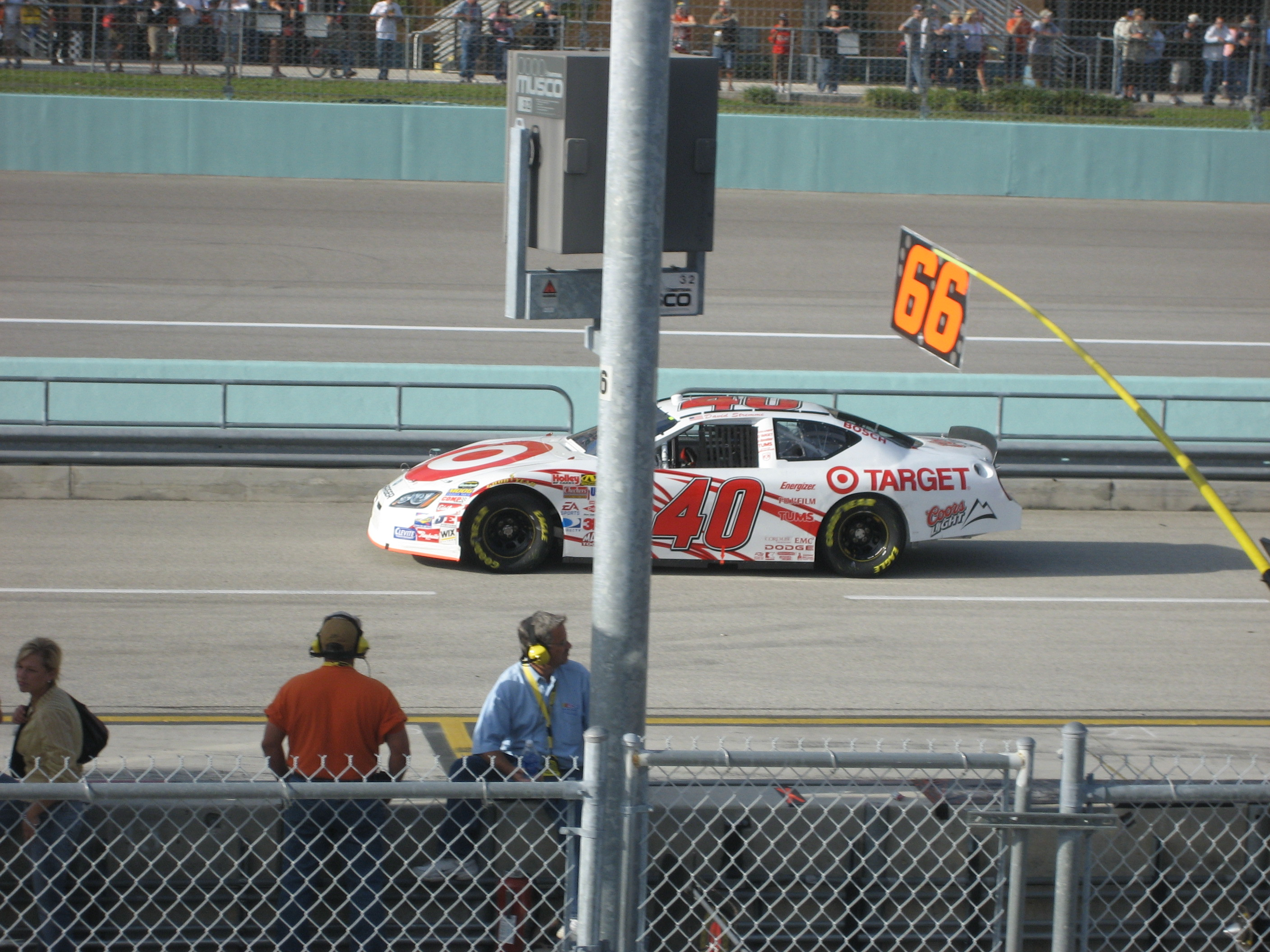
David Stremme at Homestead in 2007

Before the 2007 season started, Lone Star left the No. 40 team as primary sponsor, leaving only Coors Light. After the beginning of the season, Tums also came on as a sponsor of the No. 40 team. Stremme had a much better start to the season, earning his first Top 10 in the Samsung 500 at Texas Motor Speedway, posting his best career finish, 8th, two weeks later in the Aaron's 499 at Talladega Superspeedway, and ended the season with three Top 10s. Stremme was released due to Coors Light's departure to become the "Official Beer of NASCAR".

Dario Franchitti (2008)

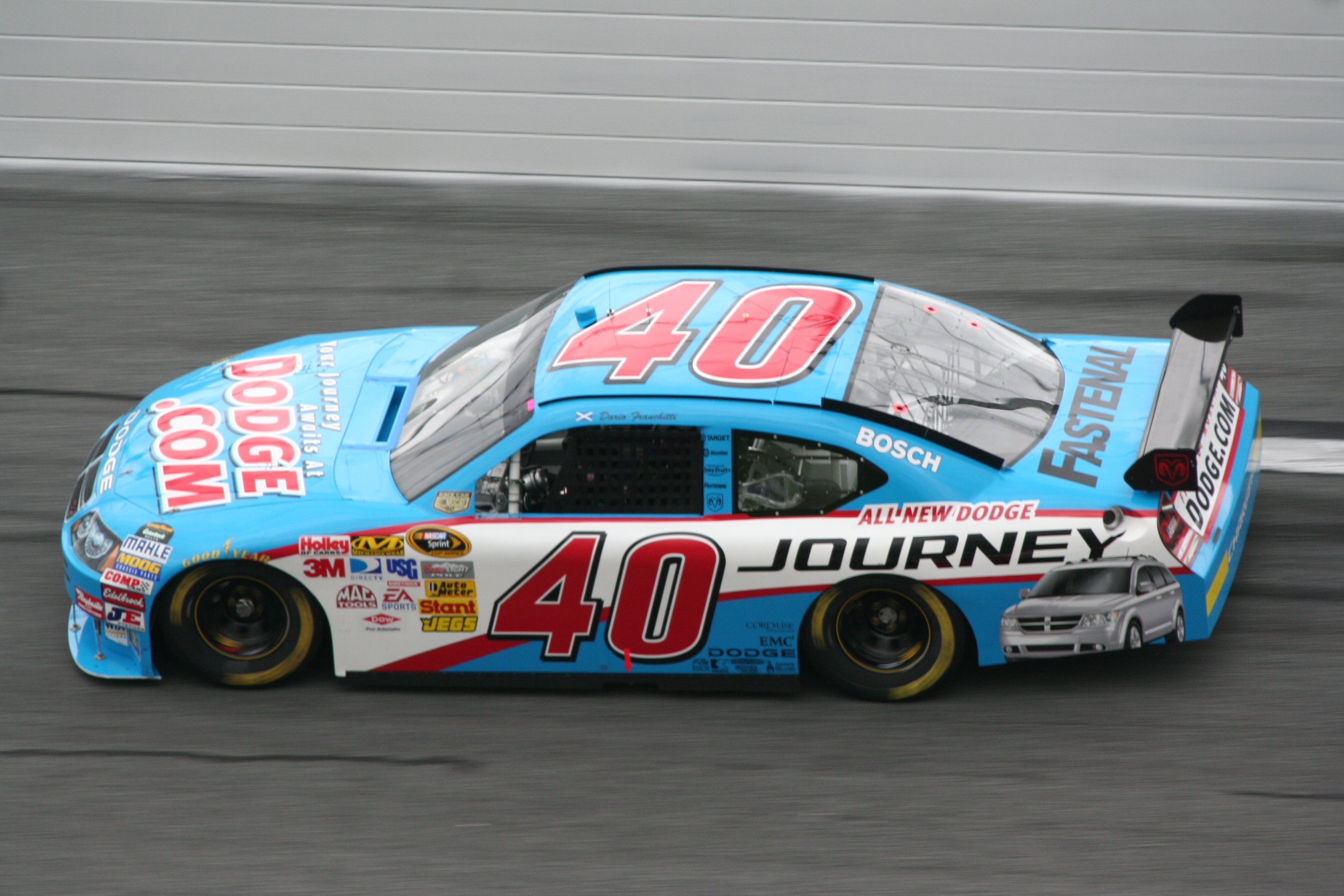
Dario Franchitti at Daytona in 2008.

On October 3, 2007, reigning Indianapolis 500 winner and IndyCar Champion Dario Franchitti was announced as the new driver of the No. 40 car for the 2008 season. Due to the lack of sponsorship, the team had to procure one-race partnerships on a rotational basis, with The Hartford, Kennametal, Dodge Journey, Target, Dodge Avenger, and Wii Fit appearing on the car. Franchitti suffered ankle injuries in a Nationwide Series race at Talladega, causing him to miss several races. Marlin, Stremme, Ken Schrader, and Jeremy Mayfield filled in during his absence.

Ganassi shut the team down in July due to its lack of funding mid-season, with around 70 employees laid off. Franchitti, meanwhile, moved to CGR's IndyCar operation. The team was revived for several fall races with Bryan Clauson driving, but race qualifying was rained out twice and the team did not make the field due to being too low in the owner points. When qualifying was finally staged at Texas, Clauson subsequently failed to qualify, and the team was shut down again.

==== Car No. 40 results ====
Year	Driver	No.	Make	1	2	3	4	5	6	7	8	9	10	11	12	13	14	15	16	17	18	19	20	21	22	23	24	25	26	27	28	29	30	31	32	33	34	35	36	Owners	Pts
1993	Kenny Wallace	40	Pontiac	DAY; 23	CAR; 23	RCH; 26	ATL; 16	DAR; 32	BRI; 13	NWS; 15	MAR; 24	TAL; 14	SON; 36	CLT; 23	DOV; 13	POC; 15	MCH; 29	DAY; 28	NHA; 21	POC; 23	TAL; 35	GLN; 9	MCH; 23	BRI; 9	DAR; 10	RCH; 32	DOV; 16	MAR; 15	NWS; 27	CLT; 35	CAR; 37	PHO; 17	ATL; 30							25th	2893
1994	Bobby Hamilton	40	Pontiac	DAY; 12	CAR; 38	RCH; 33	ATL; 19	DAR; 25	BRI; 9	NWS; 14	MAR; 13	TAL; 12	SON; 33	CLT; 17	DOV; 34	POC; 27	MCH; 41	DAY; 24	NHA; 40	POC; 23	TAL; 22	IND; 24	GLN; 34	MCH; DNQ	BRI; 28	DAR; 22	RCH; 34	DOV; 31	MAR; 13	NWS; 12	CLT; 19	CAR; 33	PHO; 11	ATL; 24						23rd	2749
1995	Greg Sacks	40	Pontiac	DAY; DNQ	CAR; 41	RCH; 19	ATL; 29	DAR; 22	BRI; 36	NWS; 35	MAR; 22	TAL; 35	SON; DNQ	CLT; DNQ	DOV; 28	POC; 33	MCH; DNQ																							40th	1548
1995	Andy Hillenburg	40	Pontiac															DAY; 36																						40th	1548
1995	Rich Bickle	40	Pontiac																NHA; 38	POC; 30		IND; 37		MCH; DNQ	BRI; 31	DAR; 21		DOV; 35	MAR; DNQ	NWS; 27	CLT; 38									40th	1548
1995	Randy LaJoie	40	Pontiac																		TAL; 40																			40th	1548
1995	Butch Leitzinger	40	Pontiac																				GLN; 12																	40th	1548
1995	Shane Hall	40	Pontiac																								RCH; DNQ					CAR; 36	PHO; DNQ	ATL; DNQ						40th	1548
1996	Jay Sauter	40	Pontiac	DAY	CAR	RCH	ATL	DAR	BRI	NWS	MAR	TAL	SON	CLT	DOV	POC	MCH	DAY	NHA	POC	TAL	IND	GLN	MCH	BRI	DAR; DNQ	RCH; DNQ	DOV	MAR	NWS										56th	235
1996	Greg Sacks	40	Chevy																												CLT; 24			ATL; 18						56th	235
1996	Robby Gordon	40	Chevy																													CAR; 42	PHO; 42							56th	235
1997	Robby Gordon	40	Chevy	DAY; 16	CAR; 33	RCH; 28	ATL; 14	DAR; 34	TEX; 34	BRI; 43	MAR; 41	SON; 41		CLT; 41					DAY; 22	NHA; 34	POC; 42	IND; 28	GLN; 4	MCH; 17	BRI; DNQ	DAR; 22	RCH; 42	NHA; 24	DOV; 33											37th	1940
1997	Joe Nemechek	40	Chevy										TAL; 19																											37th	1940
1997	Wally Dallenbach Jr.	40	Chevy												DOV; 36																									37th	1940
1997	Greg Sacks	40	Chevy													POC; 42	MCH; DNQ	CAL; 27														TAL; 39	CAR; 39	PHO; 21	ATL; DNQ					37th	1940
1997	Steve Park	40	Chevy																											MAR; 41										37th	1940
1997	Elliott Sadler	40	Chevy																												CLT; DNQ									37th	1940
1998	Sterling Marlin	40	Chevy	DAY; 22	CAR; 25	LVS; 24	ATL; DNQ	DAR; 14	BRI; 40	TEX; 14	MAR; 36	TAL; 9	CAL; 14	CLT; 15	DOV; 19	RCH; 10	MCH; 18	POC; 9	SON; 7	NHA; 35	POC; 11	IND; 11	GLN; 7	MCH; 15	BRI; 21	NHA; 17	DAR; 8	RCH; 15	DOV; 16	MAR; 18*	CLT; 30	TAL; 14	DAY; 18	PHO; 12	CAR; 13	ATL; 42				13th	3530
1999	Sterling Marlin	40	Chevy	DAY; 32	CAR; 37	LVS; 15	ATL; 18	DAR; 16	TEX; 9	BRI; 14	MAR; 13	TAL; 25	CAL; 16	RCH; 18	CLT; 40	DOV; 29	MCH; 22	POC; 4	SON; 25	DAY; 12	NHA; 34	POC; 28	IND; 16	GLN; 33	MCH; 15	BRI; 7	DAR; 40	RCH; 4	NHA; 21	DOV; 38	MAR; 11	CLT; 29	TAL; 22	CAR; 8	PHO; 40	HOM; 17	ATL; 31			16th	3397
2000	Sterling Marlin	40	Chevy	DAY; 24	CAR; 15	LVS; 18	ATL; 12	DAR; 21	BRI; 10	TEX; 34	MAR; 24	TAL; 8	CAL; 32	RCH; 29	CLT; 19	DOV; 31	MCH; 10	POC; 22	SON; 2	DAY; 25	NHA; 25	POC; 42	IND; 30	GLN; 30	MCH; 15	BRI; 8	DAR; 17	RCH; 20	NHA; 22	DOV; 37	MAR; 9	CLT; 31	TAL; 41	CAR; 33	PHO; 15	HOM; 26	ATL; 8			19th	3363
2001	Sterling Marlin	40	Dodge	DAY; 7	CAR; 8	LVS; 3	ATL; 35	DAR; 5	BRI; 12	TEX; 34	MAR; 5	TAL; 23*	CAL; 9	RCH; 11	CLT; 15	DOV; 6	MCH; 3	POC; 4	SON; 28	DAY; 39	CHI; 9	NHA; 17	POC; 16	IND; 2	GLN; 25	MCH; 1	BRI; 9	DAR; 16	RCH; 32	DOV; 8	KAN; 5	CLT; 1*	MAR; 10	TAL; 17	PHO; 34	CAR; 11	HOM; 5	ATL; 2	NHA; 2	3rd	4741
2002	Sterling Marlin	40	Dodge	DAY; 8*	CAR; 2	LVS; 1	ATL; 9	DAR; 1	BRI; 19	TEX; 7	MAR; 12	TAL; 5	CAL; 7	RCH; 11	CLT; 11	DOV; 13	POC; 4	MCH; 21	SON; 43	DAY; 3	CHI; 16	NHA; 14	POC; 3*	IND; 27	GLN; 30	MCH; 6	BRI; 7	DAR; 4	RCH; 43	NHA; 21	DOV; 21	KAN; 33								8th	4503
2002	Jamie McMurray	40	Dodge																														TAL; 26	CLT; 1*		ATL; 7	CAR; 15	PHO; 40	HOM; 22	8th	4503
2002	Mike Bliss	40	Dodge																																MAR; 14					8th	4503
2003	Sterling Marlin	40	Dodge	DAY; 17	CAR; 40	LVS; 8	ATL; 14	DAR; 39	BRI; 6	TEX; 29	TAL; 6	MAR; 7	CAL; 10	RCH; 13	CLT; 7	DOV; 35	POC; 6*	MCH; 6*	SON; 18	DAY; 19	CHI; 21	NHA; 39	POC; 10	IND; 34	GLN; 43	MCH; 19	BRI; 17	DAR; 31	RCH; 22	NHA; 29	DOV; 13	TAL; 39	KAN; 34	CLT; 15	MAR; 43	ATL; 16	PHO; 11	CAR; 10	HOM; 10	18th	3745
2004	Sterling Marlin	40	Dodge	DAY; 37	CAR; 4	LVS; 18	ATL; 16	DAR; 14	BRI; 4	TEX; 26	MAR; 9	TAL; 31	CAL; 27	RCH; 15	CLT; 39	DOV; 29	POC; 31	MCH; 6	SON; 21	DAY; 20	CHI; 7	NHA; 21	POC; 15	IND; 33	GLN; 36	MCH; 15	BRI; 6	CAL; 26	RCH; 14	NHA; 12	DOV; 15	TAL; 34	KAN; 34	CLT; 12	MAR; 4	ATL; 19	PHO; 25	DAR; 12	HOM; 16	21st	3857
2005	Sterling Marlin	40	Dodge	DAY; 8	CAL; 15	LVS; 35	ATL; 16	BRI; 11	MAR; 6	TEX; 5	PHO; 26	TAL; 34	DAR; 41	RCH; 23	CLT; 39	DOV; 32	POC; 16	MCH; 40	SON; 26	DAY; 22	CHI; 32	NHA; 34	POC; 28	IND; 9		MCH; 21	BRI; 29	CAL; 19	RCH; 41	NHA; 11	DOV; 41	TAL; 7	KAN; 13	CLT; 40	MAR; 38	ATL; 20	TEX; 23	PHO; 34	HOM; 26	30th	3183
2005	Scott Pruett	40	Dodge																						GLN; 4															30th	3183
2006	David Stremme	40	Dodge	DAY; 28	CAL; 33	LVS; 33	ATL; 33	BRI; 36	MAR; 38	TEX; 21	PHO; 29	TAL; 34	RCH; 33	DAR; 25	CLT; 31	DOV; 41	POC; 26	MCH; 19		DAY; 16	CHI; 21	NHA; 11	POC; 29	IND; 18		MCH; 28	BRI; 35	CAL; 36	RCH; 26	NHA; 20	DOV; 18	KAN; 26	TAL; 33	CLT; 15	MAR; 15	ATL; 39	TEX; 24	PHO; 18	HOM; 11	33rd	2865
2006	Scott Pruett	40	Dodge																SON; 30						GLN; 6															33rd	2865
2007	David Stremme	40	Dodge	DAY; 11	CAL; 19	LVS; 20	ATL; 13	BRI; 13	MAR; 35	TEX; 10	PHO; 43	TAL; 8	RCH; 38	DAR; 37	CLT; 17	DOV; 36	POC; 23	MCH; 40	SON; 32	NHA; 27	DAY; 22	CHI; 34	IND; 26	POC; 25	GLN; 21	MCH; 21	BRI; 14	CAL; 34	RCH; 19	NHA; 42	DOV; 39	KAN; 17	TAL; 17	CLT; 9	MAR; 37	ATL; 39	TEX; 41	PHO; 20	HOM; 11	24th	3163
2008	Dario Franchitti	40	Dodge	DAY; 33	CAL; 32	LVS; 33	ATL; 33	BRI; 36	MAR; 22	TEX; DNQ	PHO; 32						POC; 41	MCH; 43	SON; DNQ	NHA; 38	DAY	CHI	IND	POC	GLN	MCH	BRI	CAL	RCH	NHA	DOV	KAN	TAL							44th	1058
2008	David Stremme	40	Dodge									TAL; 28																												44th	1058
2008	Ken Schrader	40	Dodge										RCH; DNQ																											44th	1058
2008	Sterling Marlin	40	Dodge											DAR; 34	CLT; 31																									44th	1058
2008	Jeremy Mayfield	40	Dodge													DOV; 25																								44th	1058
2008	Bryan Clauson	40	Dodge																															CLT; DNQ	MAR	ATL; DNQ	TEX; DNQ	PHO	HOM	44th	1058

=== Additional cars ===
Part Time as the No. 46 (1997–1998)

The No. 46 car began as the No. 87 NEMCO Motorsports car owned and driven by Joe Nemechek. After he signed with SABCO in 1996, Sabates became the majority owner of the team, which debuted at the 1997 Daytona 500 as the No. 46 First Union Chevrolet driven by Wally Dallenbach Jr. After skipping several races, the team moved to full-time racing. Dallenbach competed in 22 races and finished 41st in points. He only raced in four races in the 1998 NASCAR Winston Cup Series before he was replaced by a rotation of drivers including Jeff Green, Morgan Shepherd, and Tommy Kendall.

After First Union stopped their backing at the end of the season, the team was scheduled to close down, but instead it changed its number to No. 01 and served as the team's research and development car.

No. 04 Extra entry for Jason Leffler (2001)

In 2001, The team fielded the No. 04 at Sears Point for Jason Leffler. He attempted to make the race while Dorsey Schroeder piloted Leffler's regular ride, the No. 01; Leffler did not qualify for the race.

Part Time as the No. 09/39 (2003-2005)

CGR has occasionally run an additional part-time entry for research and development or for rookie drivers making their debut. The team debuted in 2003 at Sonoma Raceway as the No. 09 Target Dodge, run under the Phoenix Racing banner, with road course specialist Scott Pruett, finishing a lap down in 34th after an incident while running in the top ten.

In the same year, Pruett would run for CGR itself at Watkins Glen as the No. 39. Pruett started 28th and finished 2nd. Pruett and the car reappeared in 2004 and 2005 at Sonoma, where Pruett finished 3rd and 31st, respectively. He also attempted Watkins Glen, but he failed to qualify both years. In 2005, former champion Bill Elliott drove the car in the Bud Shootout, due to his ride at Evernham Motorsports being unavailable. The car was sponsored by Coors, running a tribute scheme that Elliott had run in the past with the sponsor. Development driver David Stremme then drove seven races in preparation for his bid in 2006 for NASCAR Rookie of the Year, making his debut at Chicagoland Speedway in July. Stremme finished 16th in his debut. Reed Sorenson also drove at Atlanta with Discount Tire sponsorship in preparation for his full-time cup season in 2006.

In August 2005, CGR announced their plans to expand to four full-time teams, with Home123 moving up from the Busch Series to sponsor the new entry. Casey Mears, then the driver of the 41 car, was selected to drive the new entry, with Reed Sorenson moving into his old ride. Home123, then the "official mortgage company of NASCAR", was one of several mortgage companies that specialized in subprime loans to make a large investment in the sport during the peak of the U.S. housing bubble. By November, however, Home123 and Ganassi mutually ended their agreement, and Mears was tabbed to replace the departing Jamie McMurray in the No. 42 Texaco Havoline Dodge.

No. 30, Juan Pablo Motoya's Debut(2006)

In preparation for running full-time in the No. 42 car in 2007, Formula One and Indy 500 winner Juan Pablo Montoya made his Cup debut at the 2006 season finale Ford 400 at Homestead, in a Texaco Havoline car numbered No. 30. Montoya qualified 29th and ran as high as 13th, but was involved in an incident with Ryan Newman on lap 254, leading Montoya's car to crash and erupt in flames. Montoya was credited with a 34th-place finish.

==== Part Time Car results ====
Year	Driver	No.	Make	1	2	3	4	5	6	7	8	9	10	11	12	13	14	15	16	17	18	19	20	21	22	23	24	25	26	27	28	29	30	31	32	33	34	35	36	Owners	Pts
1997	Wally Dallenbach Jr.	46	Chevy	DAY; 42	CAR	RCH	ATL; DNQ	DAR	TEX; DNQ	BRI	MAR	SON; 15	TAL; 17	CLT; 35	DOV	POC; 17	MCH; 20	CAL; 39	DAY; 39	NHA	POC; 38	IND; 36	GLN; 10	MCH; 41	BRI; 26	DAR; 41	RCH; 41	NHA; 31	DOV	MAR; 34	CLT; 37	TAL; 41	CAR; 35	PHO; DNQ	ATL; 38					43rd	1501
1998	Wally Dallenbach Jr.	46	Chevy	DAY; DNQ	CAR; DNQ	LVS; 38	ATL; 39	DAR; DNQ		TEX; 19	MAR; DNQ	TAL; 26																												42nd	2139
1998	Morgan Shepherd	46	Chevy						BRI; 24				CAL; 24	CLT; DNQ	DOV; DNQ																									42nd	2139
1998	Jeff Green	46	Chevy													RCH; 42	MCH; 30	POC; 33		NHA; 12	POC; 24	IND; 30		MCH; 41	BRI; 17	NHA; 38	DAR; 16	RCH; 20	DOV; 34	MAR; 31	CLT; DNQ	TAL; 33	DAY; 37	PHO; 28	CAR; 27	ATL; 36				42nd	2139
1998	Tommy Kendall	46	Chevy																SON; DNQ				GLN; 17																	42nd	2139
1999	Jeff Green	01	Chevy	DAY	CAR	LVS	ATL	DAR	TEX	BRI	MAR	TAL	CAL	RCH	CLT; DNQ	DOV	MCH	POC; 21	SON	DAY	NHA	POC																		60th	100
1999	Steve Grissom	01	Chevy																				IND; DNQ	GLN	MCH	BRI	DAR						TAL; 28	CAR	PHO	HOM	ATL			60th	100
1999	Ron Hornaday Jr.	01	Chevy																									RCH; 29	NHA	DOV	MAR; DNQ	CLT								60th	100
2001	Jason Leffler	04	Dodge	DAY	CAR	LVS	ATL	DAR	BRI	TEX	MAR	TAL	CAL	RCH	CLT	DOV	MCH	POC	SON; DNQ	DAY	CHI	NHA	POC	IND	GLN	MCH	BRI	DAR	RCH	DOV	KAN	CLT	MAR	TAL	PHO	CAR	HOM	ATL	NHA	73rd	0
2003	Scott Pruett	09	Dodge	DAY	CAR	LVS	ATL	DAR	BRI	TEX	TAL	MAR	CAL	RCH	CLT	DOV	POC	MCH	SON; 34	DAY	CHI	NHA	POC	IND	GLN	MCH	BRI	DAR	RCH	NHA	DOV	TAL	KAN	CLT	MAR	ATL	PHO	CAR	HOM	44th	788
2003	Scott Pruett	39	Dodge	DAY	CAR	LVS	ATL	DAR	BRI	TEX	TAL	MAR	CAL	RCH	CLT	DOV	POC	MCH	SON	DAY	CHI	NHA	POC	IND	GLN; 2	MCH	BRI	DAR	RCH	NHA	DOV	TAL	KAN	CLT	MAR	ATL	PHO	CAR	HOM	49th	236
2004	Scott Pruett	39	Dodge	DAY	CAR	LVS	ATL	DAR	BRI	TEX	MAR	TAL	CAL	RCH	CLT	DOV	POC	MCH	SON; 3	DAY	CHI	NHA	POC	IND	GLN; DNQ	MCH	BRI	CAL	RCH	NHA	DOV	TAL	KAN	CLT	MAR	ATL	PHO	DAR	HOM	60th	201
2005	Scott Pruett	39	Dodge	DAY	CAL	LVS	ATL	BRI	MAR	TEX	PHO	TAL	DAR	RCH	CLT	DOV	POC	MCH	SON; 31	DAY					GLN; DNQ	MCH	BRI	CAL												54th	416
2005	David Stremme	39	Dodge																		CHI; 16	NHA	POC	IND					RCH; 42	NHA	DOV	TAL	KAN	CLT; 36	MAR				HOM; 42	54th	416
2005	Reed Sorenson	39	Dodge																																	ATL; 41	TEX; DNQ	PHO		54th	416
2006	Juan Pablo Montoya	30	Dodge	DAY	CAL	LVS	ATL	BRI	MAR	TEX	PHO	TAL	RCH	DAR	CLT	DOV	POC	MCH	SON	DAY	CHI	NHA	POC	IND	GLN	MCH	BRI	CAL	RCH	NHA	DOV	KAN	TAL	CLT	MAR	ATL	TEX	PHO	HOM; 34	66th	61

== Xfinity Series ==
CGR/FS began running in the then-Busch Series as SABCO Racing in 1995, attempting nine races in the No. 42 Pontiac with Kyle Petty, Bobby Hamilton and Dennis Setzer. Band-Aid and Service Merchandise sponsored Hamilton and Turner’s attempts while Coors Light came onboard for Petty’s one-off at Homestead. Overall, the team qualified for seven races, their best finish being a 15th place with Hamilton at Nashville. SABCO returned to the series in 2000, fielding two full-time teams (numbered 81 and 82) and one part-time (numbered 42). The No. 42 BellSouth-sponsored Chevrolet was primarily driven by Kenny Irwin Jr., with Steadman Marlin running two races at Nashville and Memphis. The No. 42 had run 10 races with Irwin finishing in the Top 10 twice before he was killed in a practice accident at New Hampshire. Like Irwin's Cup team, the number was switched to 01, and Sterling Marlin became the new driver. He raced three races in the 01, finishing in the Top 10 twice. Blaise Alexander drove the No. 81 TracFone/WCW Chevy full-time in 2000, and had two top-tens and finished 25th in points, despite failing to qualify for the season-opening race. Dave Steele was hired by SABCO to drive the No. 82 Channellock-sponsored Chevy full-time, but after failing to qualify for three out of the first five races, he was released. Sterling Marlin won the next race at Bristol in the No. 82, while Jeff Fuller failed to qualify in his attempt in the car the following week at Texas. After Derek Gilcrest drove for a pair of races, Glenn Allen Jr. drove for the next five races, not finishing better than 29th. Jason White drove for two short track races, followed by Anthony Lazzaro at Watkins Glen, Andy Houston at Milwaukee, and Austin Cameron at Nazareth and Pikes Peak. Ted Musgrave then signed on for the next eight races, finishing eighth at Lowe's. Marty Houston finished the season in the No. 82, with a best finish of 14th. At the end of the 2000 season, SABCO's Busch equipment was sold to HighLine Performance Group (later FitzBradshaw Racing), owned by Sabates' son-in-law Armando Fitz.

The Busch Series program was restarted by CGR from 2004 to 2008, run primarily to develop drivers including Reed Sorenson, David Stremme, Dario Franchitti, and Bryan Clauson. The team won eight races over the five year stretch, but shut down following CGR's merger with Dale Earnhardt, Inc. At the end of 2014, CGR acquired Steve Turner's interest in the Nationwide (now Xfinity) operations of Turner Scott Motorsports, which had fielded entries in the Nationwide Series, Truck Series, K&N Pro Series East and West, and ARCA Racing Series for Ganassi drivers Kyle Larson and Dylan Kwasniewski between late 2012 and 2014. Though Turner Scott was a two car Xfinity operation (at one point operating as many as five entries), the operation under Ganassi was reduced to a single-car entry running under Harry Scott's banner, HScott Motorsports with Chip Ganassi.

On January 4, 2019, Chip Ganassi Racing announced the closure of their Xfinity program due to lack of sponsorship. The shutdown was announced after the home of the CEO of DC Solar, the team's primary sponsor, was raided by the FBI on December 18, 2018.

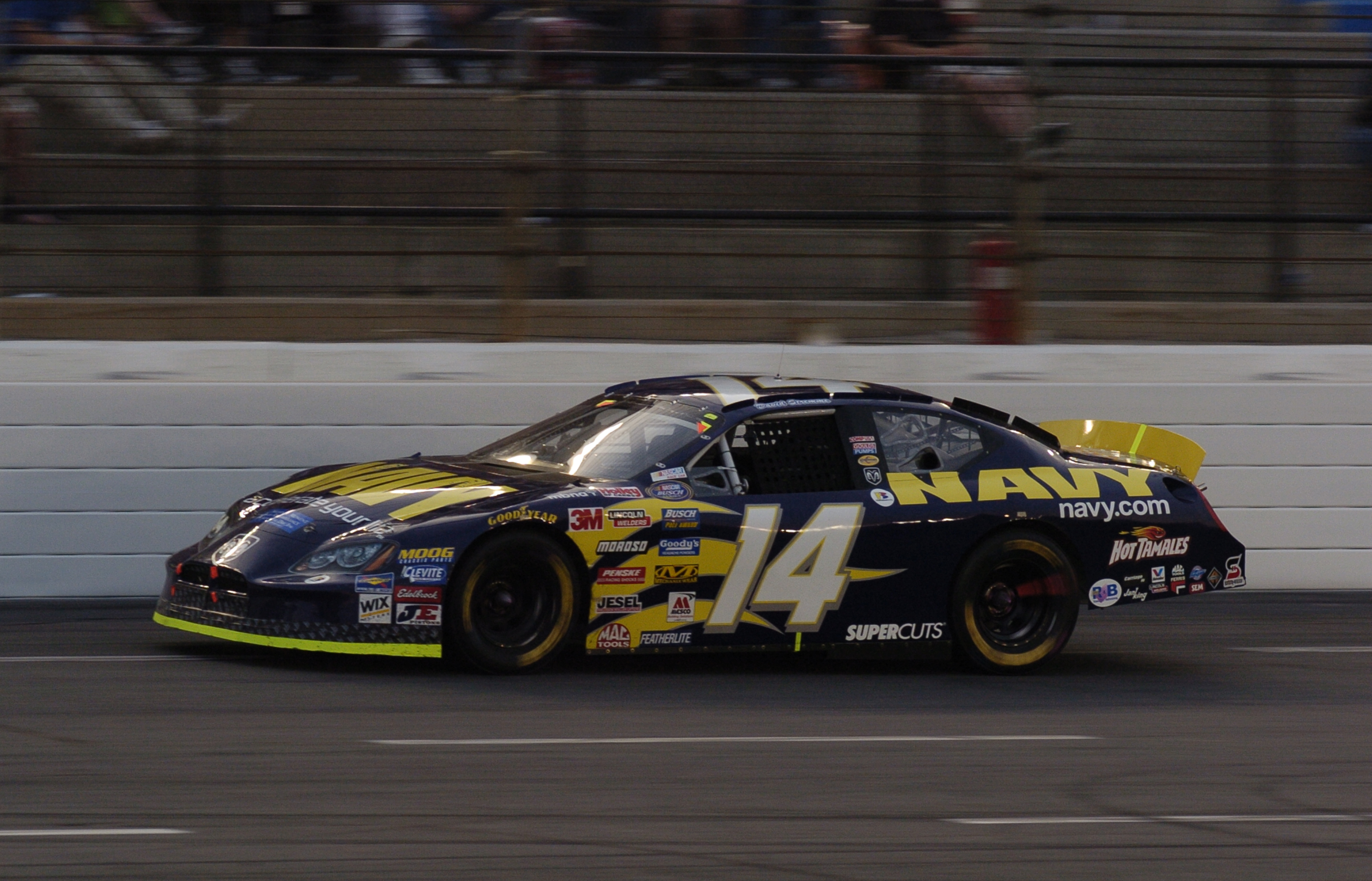
David Stremme at Charlotte in 2005.

=== Car No. 14 history (Fitz-Bradshaw Racing Alliance) ===
In 2003, CGR Cup driver Casey Mears drove 14 races in the No. 19 Dodge for Braun Racing sponsored by CGR partner Target, with Braun forming a technical alliance with Ganassi. For 2004, the alliance continued, with Braun fielding the No. 32 TrimSpa Dodge for Ganassi development driver David Stremme. Late in the season, Stremme left Braun to drive the No. 14 NAVY Chevrolet for FitzBradshaw Racing – formed from Felix Sabates' former Busch Series team in 2000 – replacing Casey Atwood. In a similar technical alliance with Ganassi, the team switched to Dodge to field Stremme for the full 2005 season. Stremme had five top 5s and 10 top 10s en route to a 13th-place finish, then moved up to the No. 40 Cup ride with Ganassi for 2006.

=== Car No. 40 history ===
As part of the alliance with FitzBradshaw Racing, in 2005 a new No. 40 car was fielded by Fitz as a Dodge team with Ganassi's veteran Cup driver Sterling Marlin as the primary driver. Cottman Transmission, Family Dollar and Jani-King served as primary sponsors. Marlin ran 18 races for the team with five Top 10s, then replaced Tim Fedewa in the team's No. 12 car at Gateway. Reed Sorenson moved over to the No. 40 at Atlanta when his No. 41 Ganassi car missed the race, finishing 19th. CGR development driver Scott Lagasse Jr. ran five races in the car, with a best finish of 22nd. Carlos Contreras, Paul Wolfe, and Erin Crocker also ran races in the 40 car.

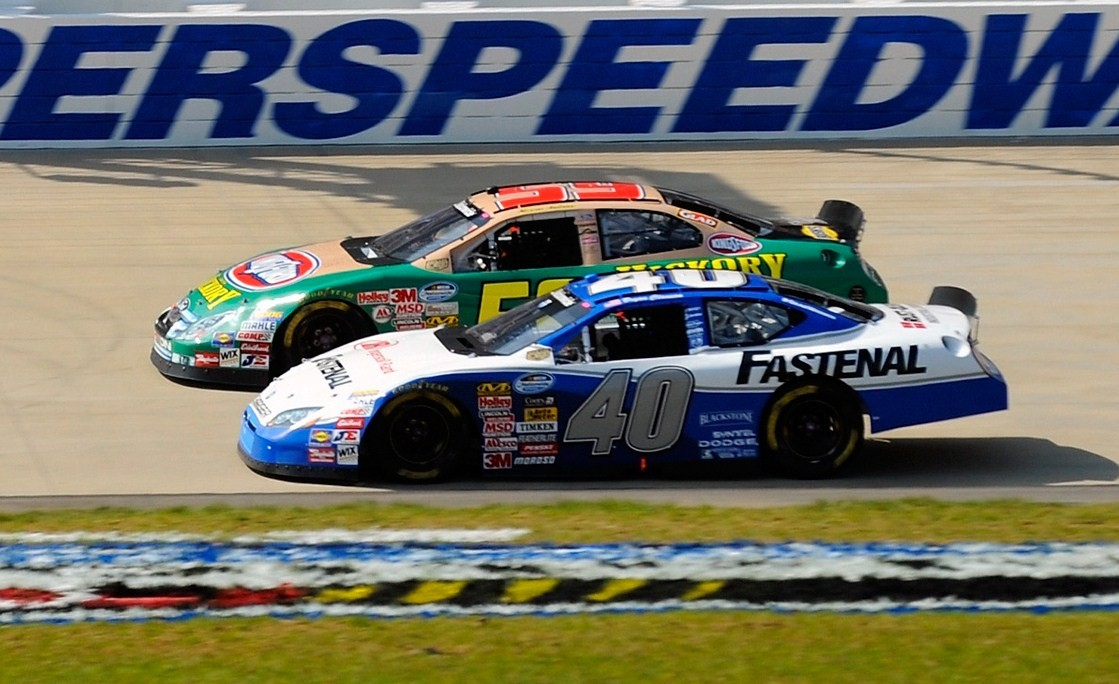
Bryan Clauson racing Marcos Ambrose at Nashville in 2008.

For 2008, rookies Franchitti and Bryan Clauson shared the No. 40 car, along with Reed Sorenson, Juan Pablo Montoya, Scott Pruett, and Kevin Hamlin, with sponsorship coming from Fastenal. Late in the season, with Franchitti departing from the sport, Clauson took over the car permanently. The drivers combined for three Top 5 finishes and five Top 10s, with a best finish of third at Autódromo Hermanos Rodríguez with Pruett. Clauson finished second in Rookie of the Year standings to Landon Cassill. In December 2008, the newly formed Earnhardt Ganassi Racing announced that they had closed the No. 40 team down, due to a lack of sponsorship.

=== Car No. 41 history ===
Reed Sorenson (2004–2006)

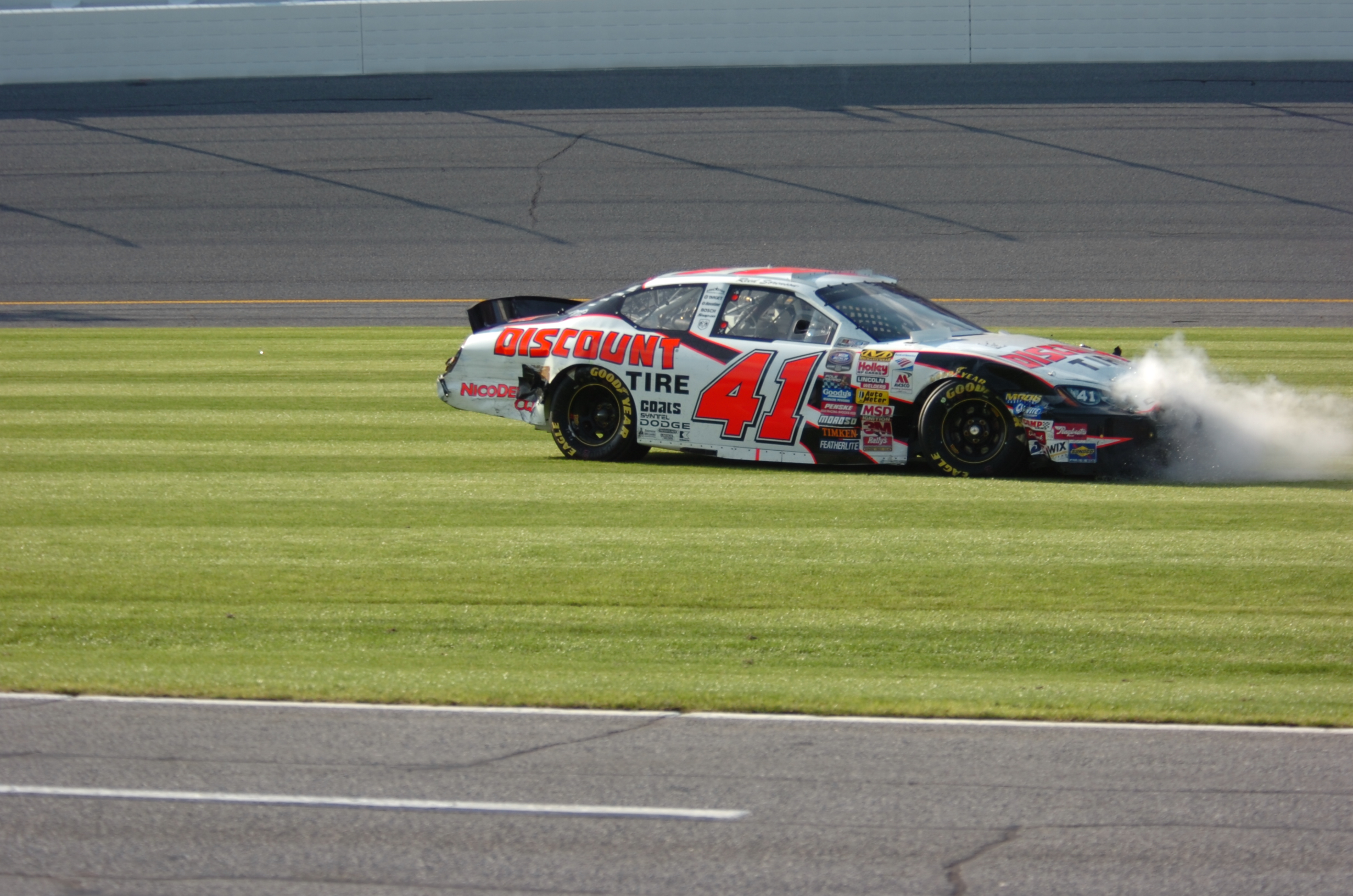
Reed Sorenson at Daytona in 2006.

The 41 car began racing at the 2004 Kroger 200 when Reed Sorenson made his NASCAR debut with sponsorship from Discount Tire. He qualified third and finished 13th. For the rest of the season, Sorenson, Casey Mears, and Jamie McMurray ran limited schedules in the No. 41, with McMurray picking up a win at Phoenix. In 2005, Sorenson drove full-time, picking up two wins and finishing fourth in points. He drove most of the 2006 season, except the AT&T 250, where David Stremme finished eleventh in his place.

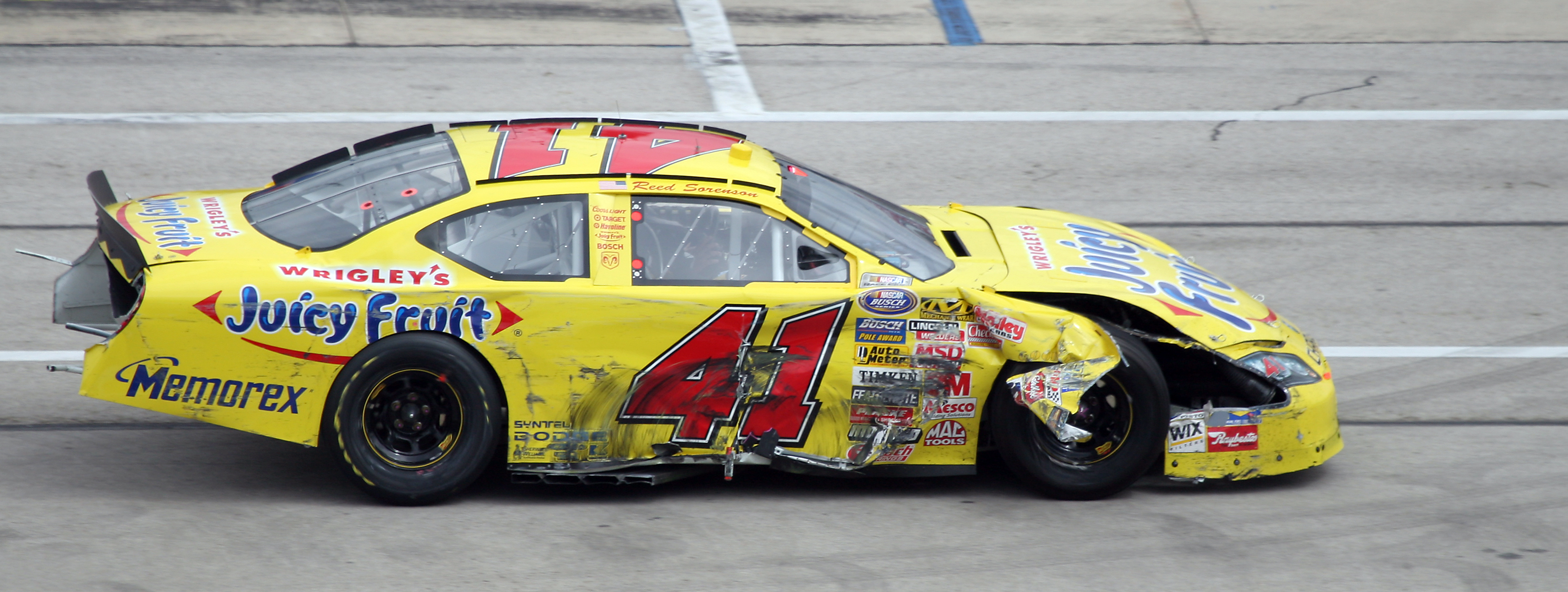
Sorenson in 2007.

Multiple drivers (2007–2008)

For 2007 Discount Tire left for Roush Fenway Racing and Wrigley's became the new sponsor. Brian Pattie was the team crew chief. Sorenson and Stremme shared the No. 41 for most of the season, with Sorenson winning at Gateway. Scott Pruett ran the road courses. At Montreal with 3 laps left, Pruett was running in third place when he got in contact with Kevin Harvick. Harvick responded by waving his hand in anger and spinning Pruett around in turn 1. Pruett's accident collected Ron Fellows, Jeff Burton, Ron Hornaday Jr., and several others. Pruett restarted in 10th place but his speed never returned; finishing him in 14th place. Later in the season, Bryan Clauson came on board with Memorex sponsorship then drove for five races with a best finish of eighteenth, before A. J. Allmendinger finished out the season in the No. 41. Bryan Clauson began the 2008 season in the No. 41 with Polaroid sponsorship, before Kyle Krisiloff drove for a few races. After the spring Talladega race, the 41 was shut down.

=== Car No. 42 history ===
In 1995, SABCO Racing, running the No. 42 Band-Aid-sponsored Pontiac in eight races with Bobby Hamilton and Dennis Setzer. SABCO returned to the series in 2000, fielding the No. 42 BellSouth-sponsored Chevrolet was primarily driven by Kenny Irwin Jr., with Steadman Marlin running two races at Nashville and Memphis. The No. 42 had run 10 races with Irwin finishing in the Top 10 twice before he was killed in a practice accident at New Hampshire.

Casey Mears (2006)

The car debuted under Ganassi in 2006 as the No. 42 Texaco/Havoline-sponsored Dodge. Casey Mears drove nine races and won his first career race at Chicagoland Speedway. Juan Pablo Montoya drove the last four races of the year, posting an 11th-place finish in his series debut at Memphis, and two top tens.

Multiple drivers (2007)

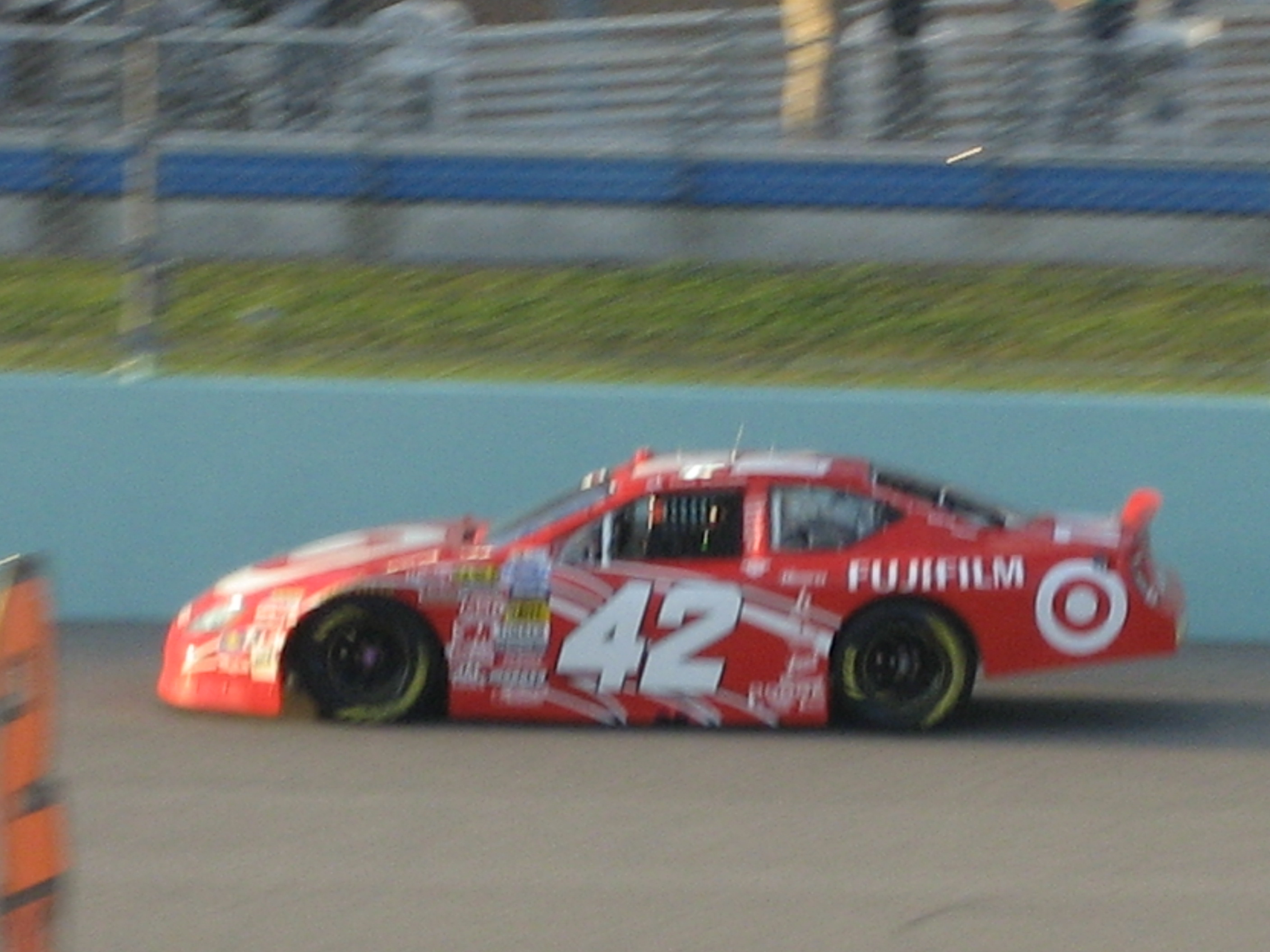
Dario Franchitti at Homestead in 2007.

For 2007, Ganassi announced that Montoya and Kevin Hamlin would split the driving duties. Montoya drove seventeen races the next season, and won his first race at Autódromo Hermanos Rodríguez and had three top-tens. Hamlin made seven starts, including two consecutive Top 10's at Gateway and IRP. After Michael Valiante drove at Circuit Gilles Villeneuve and David Stremme at Bristol, it was announced the 42 team would shut down effective immediately, but that decision and was rescinded and A. J. Allmendinger was named driver for the next five races, though he failed to finish higher than 14th. Dario Franchitti finished out the year with Target sponsorship, qualifying in the Top 10 twice.

Smith-Ganassi Racing (2009)

With Ganassi switching to Chevrolet, the remnants of the No. 40 team were purchased by businessman Eddie Smith and professional boxer Evander Holyfield in February 2009 to form Smith-Ganassi Racing, later known as Team 42 Racing, renumbering the car once again to 42. The team ran part-time schedules over the next two years, primarily with Kenny Hendrick, David Gilliland, and Team Penske development driver Parker Kligerman. Ganassi driver Kevin Hamlin also ran a single 2009 race at Gateway.

At the 2009 Bristol spring race, EGR fielded a car for then-DEI development driver Trevor Bayne, leasing the No. 52 owner's points from Means Racing. The car was provided to Ganassi by then-partner Front Row Motorsports, with FRM sponsor Taco Bell appearing on the car. Bayne would finish 23rd in his series debut, later moving to Michael Waltrip Racing.

Multiple drivers (2013–2018)

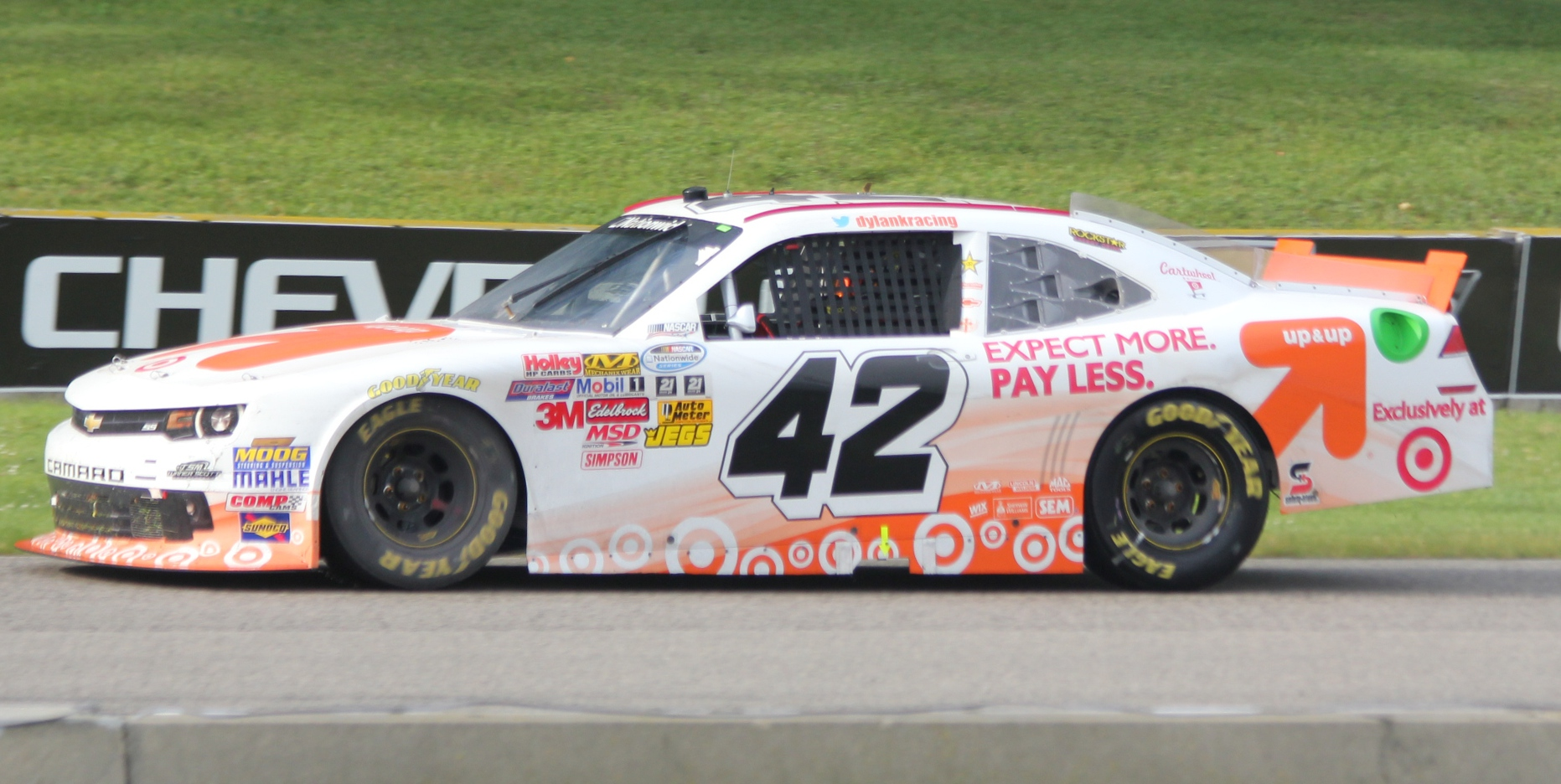
Kwasniewski racing in the No. 42 at Road America in 2014

In 2013, Turner Scott Motorsports was contracted to field CGR development driver Kyle Larson in their No. 32 car, with Larson winning Rookie of the Year. In 2014, the car was renumbered to Ganassi's No. 42, with Larson and Dylan Kwasniewski sharing the ride, with Kwasniewski ran the majority of the season in TSM's No. 31 car. Larson scored his first win at Fontana in March, and won again at Charlotte in May.

At the end of 2014, crew chief Scott Zipadelli was released from the team. In December 2014, it was announced that Chip Ganassi Racing would partner with TSM co-owner Harry Scott to bring the 42 car in-house under the name HScott Motorsports with Chip Ganassi. The 31 team was shut down due to logistical and funding issues. Larson returned for a part-time schedule. Larson's sponsors included Parker Hannifin, which sponsored him as an adolescent midget car racer, and returning sponsor ENEOS. Target, and its associated brands, also ran some races. On February 10, 2015, ARCA Racing Series race winner Brennan Poole was signed to contest a 15-race schedule – later expanded to 17 races – in the 42, sponsored by DC Solar Solutions. Poole replaced Kwasniewski, whose sponsor Rockstar Energy chose not to renew. In March after two races, it was confirmed that Kwasniewski would not drive for the team at all. This expanded Larson's schedule to around 14 races. Justin Marks, partner with Harry Scott in the K&N Series, ran the three road course events for the team. Poole finished 9th in his series debut at Las Vegas. He scored two top tens and ten top-15s during the season. Larson scored a win in the season finale at Homestead, after leading 118 laps and passing Austin Dillon with four laps to go.

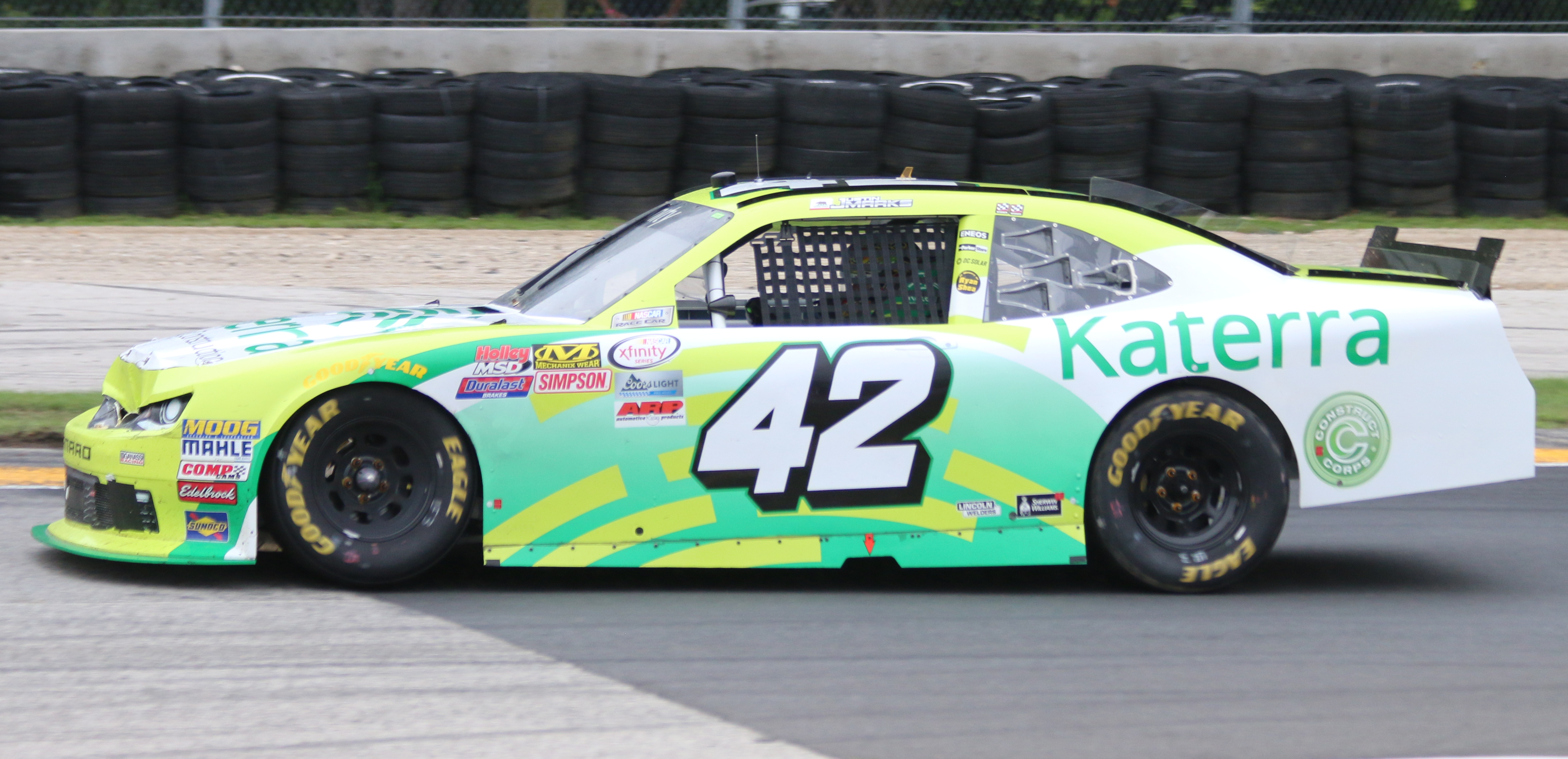
Justin Marks at Road America in 2016.

Though the team was run in-house in 2015, the No. 42 was brought back under the Ganassi umbrella in full for 2016. Larson returned for 17 races, with the same sponsorship from Eneos and Parker. With Poole moving to a new No. 48 Ganassi entry, Marks expanded his schedule to take over all of the oval races not run by Larson, in addition to road courses. Marks, in the No. 42 Katerra-sponsored Chevrolet picked up the win in the 2016 Mid-Ohio Challenge at Mid-Ohio Sports Car Course in rainy conditions.

In 2017, Larson returned with the same sponsors and schedule (Eneos and Parker), winning two races. The team also added former Brad Keselowski Racing driver Tyler Reddick to drive on a part-time basis in 2017. Hendrick Motorsports development driver Alex Bowman also made two starts in the car. In addition to Larson's two wins, both young drivers also won a race in 2017. Reddick won at Kentucky with Broken Bow Records on the car, while Bowman was victorious at Charlotte with Hendrick and Vannoy Construction sponsorship.

In 2018, Larson returned once again for a part-time schedule. This time, series rookie John Hunter Nemechek ran the majority of the races in the 2018 season after Tyler Reddick left the team at the end of 2017 to go to JR Motorsports. Nemechek previously was running full-time in the NASCAR Camping World Truck Series in 2017. Larson won in four of his six starts in the car, while Nemechek took his first Xfinity win at Kansas. Late in the season, JD Motorsports driver Ross Chastain joined the team for three races, winning at Las Vegas. McMurray and Marks also each made three starts in the car.

Chastain had been hired to drive the No. 42 full-time for 2019 at the time of the shutdown announcement, and remained "tied to us" according to a team statement; he would eventually drive Ganassi's #42 Cup Series car in 2021. MBM Motorsports purchased the Xfinity #42 owner points and some of the equipment before the 2019 season.

==== Car No. 42 Results ====
Year	Driver	No.	Make	1	2	3	4	5	6	7	8	9	10	11	12	13	14	15	16	17	18	19	20	21	22	23	24	25	26	27	28	29	30	31	32	33	34	35	Owners	Pts	Ref
1995	Bobby Hamilton	42	Pontiac	DAY; 36	CAR	RCH	ATL	NSV; 15	DAR	BRI; 21	HCY	NHA	NZH	CLT; DNQ	DOV	MYB	GLN	MLW	TAL; 37	SBO																					
1995	Dennis Setzer	42	Pontiac																		IRP; 23	MCH	BRI	DAR	RCH; 31	DOV	CLT; 22	CAR	HOM												
2000	Kenny Irwin Jr.	42	Chevy	DAY; 39	CAR; 31	LVS; DNQ	ATL; 10	DAR; 19	BRI; 30	TEX; 16		TAL; 9	CAL; 32	RCH; DNQ	NHA	CLT; 20	DOV	SBO	MYB	GLN	MLW	NZH	PPR	GTY	IRP	MCH	BRI	DAR	RCH	DOV	CLT	CAR	MEM	PHO	HOM						
2000	Steadman Marlin	42	Chevy								NSV; 30																														
2006	Casey Mears	42	Dodge	DAY	CAL; 40	MXC	LVS	ATL; 16	BRI	TEX; 3	NSH	PHO; 8	TAL	RCH	DAR	CLT; 4	DOV	NSH	KEN	MLW	DAY	CHI; 1	NHA	MAR	GTW	IRP	GLN	MCH; 2	BRI	CAL; 16	RCH	DOV	KAN	CLT; 26							
2006	Juan Pablo Montoya	42	Dodge																																MEM; 11	TEX; 28	PHO; 20	HOM; 14			
2007	Juan Pablo Montoya	42	Dodge	DAY; 40	CAL; 39	MXC; 1*	LVS; 20	ATL; 8	BRI; 14		TEX; 30	PHO; 21	TAL; 7	RCH; 11	DAR; 15	CLT; 40	DOV; 14				NHA; 34	DAY; 30	CHI; 21				GLN; 33														
2007	Kevin Hamlin	42	Dodge							NSH; 18								NSH; 23	KEN; 21	MLW; 16				GTY; 7	IRP; 8			MCH; 42													
2007	Michael Valiante	42	Dodge																							CGV; 34															
2007	David Stremme	42	Dodge																										BRI; 15												
2007	A. J. Allmendinger	42	Dodge																											CAL; 36	RCH; 14	DOV; 21	KAN; 25	CLT; 26							
2007	Dario Franchitti	42	Dodge																																MEM; 32	TEX; 25	PHO; 29	HOM; 39			
2008	Juan Pablo Montoya	42	Dodge	DAY	CAL	LVS	ATL	BRI	NSH	TEX	PHO	MXC	TAL	RCH	DAR	CLT	DOV	NSH	KEN	MLW	NHA	DAY	CHI	GTY	IRP	CGV	GLN	MCH	BRI	CAL	RCH	DOV	KAN	CLT	MEM	TEX	PHO	HOM; 17			
2009	Kenny Hendrick	42	Dodge	DAY; 41	CAL; 26	LVS; 12	BRI; 30	TEX; 25	NSH; 35	PHO; DNQ	TAL; 42	RCH; DNQ	DAR; 36				KEN; 34	MLW	NHA																						
2009	David Gilliland	42	Dodge											CLT; 15	DOV	NSH				DAY; 27	CHI								ATL; 15	RCH	DOV	KAN	CAL								
2009	Kevin Hamlin	42	Dodge																			GTY; 43	IRP	IOW	GLN	MCH															
2009	Scott Lagasse Jr.	42	Dodge																								BRI; DNQ	CGV													
2009	Aric Almirola	42	Dodge																															CLT; 27							
2009	Todd Kluever	42	Dodge																																MEM; DNQ	TEX	PHO				
2009	Parker Kligerman	42	Dodge																																			HOM; 25			
2010	Parker Kligerman	42	Dodge	DAY; Wth	CAL; 22	LVS; 35	BRI; DNQ	NSH	PHO	TEX	TAL; 31	RCH	DAR	DOV	CLT; DNQ	NSH	KEN	ROA	NHA	DAY	CHI; 13	GTY	IRP	IOW	GLN	MCH	BRI; 9	CGV				KAN; 24	CAL	CLT		TEX; 34	PHO	HOM; 13			
2010	David Gilliland	42	Dodge																										ATL; 17	RCH	DOV										
2010	Brandon McReynolds	42	Dodge																																GTW; 19						
2013	Kyle Larson	32	Chevy	DAY; 13	PHO; 13	LVS; 32	BRI; 2	CAL; 6	TEX; 32	RCH; 8	TAL; 38	DAR; 6	CLT; 4	DOV; 10	IOW; 5	MCH; 2	ROA; 7	KEN; 7	DAY; 6	NHA; 14	CHI; 12	IND; 11	IOW; 5	GLN; 30	MOH; 14	BRI; 5	ATL; 5	RCH; 14	CHI; 32	KEN; 33	DOV; 2	KAN; 30	CLT; 13	TEX; 9	PHO; 32	HOM; 2*					
2014	Kyle Larson	42	Chevy	DAY; 10	PHO; 4	LVS; 3	BRI; 2	CAL; 1	TEX; 3	DAR; 6	RCH; 4	TAL; 30		CLT; 1*	DOV; 6	MCH; 8*		KEN; 9	DAY; 5	NHA; 4	CHI; 3	IND; 8		GLN; 15		BRI; 26	ATL; 3	RCH; 13	CHI; 2		DOV; 6	KAN; 30	CLT; 5	TEX; 12	PHO; 13	HOM; 3*			4th	1173	
2014	Dylan Kwasniewski	42	Chevy										IOW; 11				ROA; 26						IOW; 9		MOH; 8					KEN; 12									4th	1173	
2015	Kyle Larson	42	Chevy	DAY; 8	ATL; 10			CAL; 7						CLT; 33		MCH; 3					IND; 7		GLN; 28		BRI; 2		DAR; 7		CHI; 22		DOV; 5			TEX; 33	PHO; 15	HOM; 1*			15th	942	
2015	Brennan Poole	42	Chevy			LVS; 9	PHO; 26		TEX; 13	BRI; 11	RCH; 13	TAL; 28	IOW; 38		DOV; 12		CHI; 17	DAY; 36	KEN; 12	NHA; 10		IOW; 14						RCH; 11		KEN; 32		CLT; 21	KAN; 13						15th	942	
2015	Justin Marks	42	Chevy																					MOH; 15		ROA; 7													15th	942	
2016	Kyle Larson	42	Chevy	DAY; 34	ATL; 2			CAL; 8	TEX; 11	BRI; 3*				CLT; 6	POC; 1*						IND; 4		GLN; 3		BRI; 3*		DAR; 4		CHI; 2			CLT; 4*	KAN; 5	TEX; 1		HOM; 7			7th	2222	
2016	Justin Marks	42	Chevy			LVS; 34	PHO; 15				RCH; 13	TAL; 11	DOV; 40			MCH; 22	IOW; 18	DAY; 37	KEN; 12	NHA; 18		IOW; 19		MOH; 1*		ROA; 32		RCH; 22		KEN; 15	DOV; 31				PHO; 15				7th	2222	
2017	Tyler Reddick	42	Chevy	DAY; 20			PHO; 14		TEX; 33			TAL; 20	CLT; 10			MCH; 13	IOW; 3	DAY; 27	KEN; 10		IND; 37	IOW; 36			BRI; 11		DAR; 16	RCH; 17		KEN; 1*	DOV; 26		KAN; 2			HOM; 4			5th	2351	
2017	Kyle Larson	42	Chevy		ATL; 3	LVS; 2		CAL; 1		BRI; 7*	RCH; 1			DOV; 1*	POC; 3					NHA; 4			GLN; 40						CHI; 2					TEX; 3					5th	2351	
2017	Justin Marks	42	Chevy																					MOH; 9		ROA; 4													5th	2351	
2017	Alex Bowman	42	Chevy																													CLT; 1			PHO; 8				5th	2351	
2018	Kyle Larson	42	Chevy	DAY; 29*		LVS; 1*												CHI; 1*	DAY; 1*				GLN; 27		BRI; 1*														2nd	4034	
2018	John Hunter Nemechek	42	Chevy		ATL; 4			CAL; 29		BRI; 13	RCH; 13	TAL; 7	DOV; 14		POC; 7	MCH; 13	IOW; 15			KEN; 7	NHA; 4	IOW; 5						IND; 25				DOV; 9	KAN; 1	TEX; 4	PHO; 9	HOM; 3			2nd	4034	
2018	Jamie McMurray	42	Chevy				PHO; 5		TEX; 7					CLT; 31																									2nd	4034	
2018	Justin Marks	42	Chevy																					MOH; 22		ROA; 6					ROV; 2								2nd	4034	
2018	Ross Chastain	42	Chevy																								DAR; 25*		LVS; 1*	RCH; 2									2nd	4034	

=== Car No. 48 history ===
Brennan Poole (2016–2017)

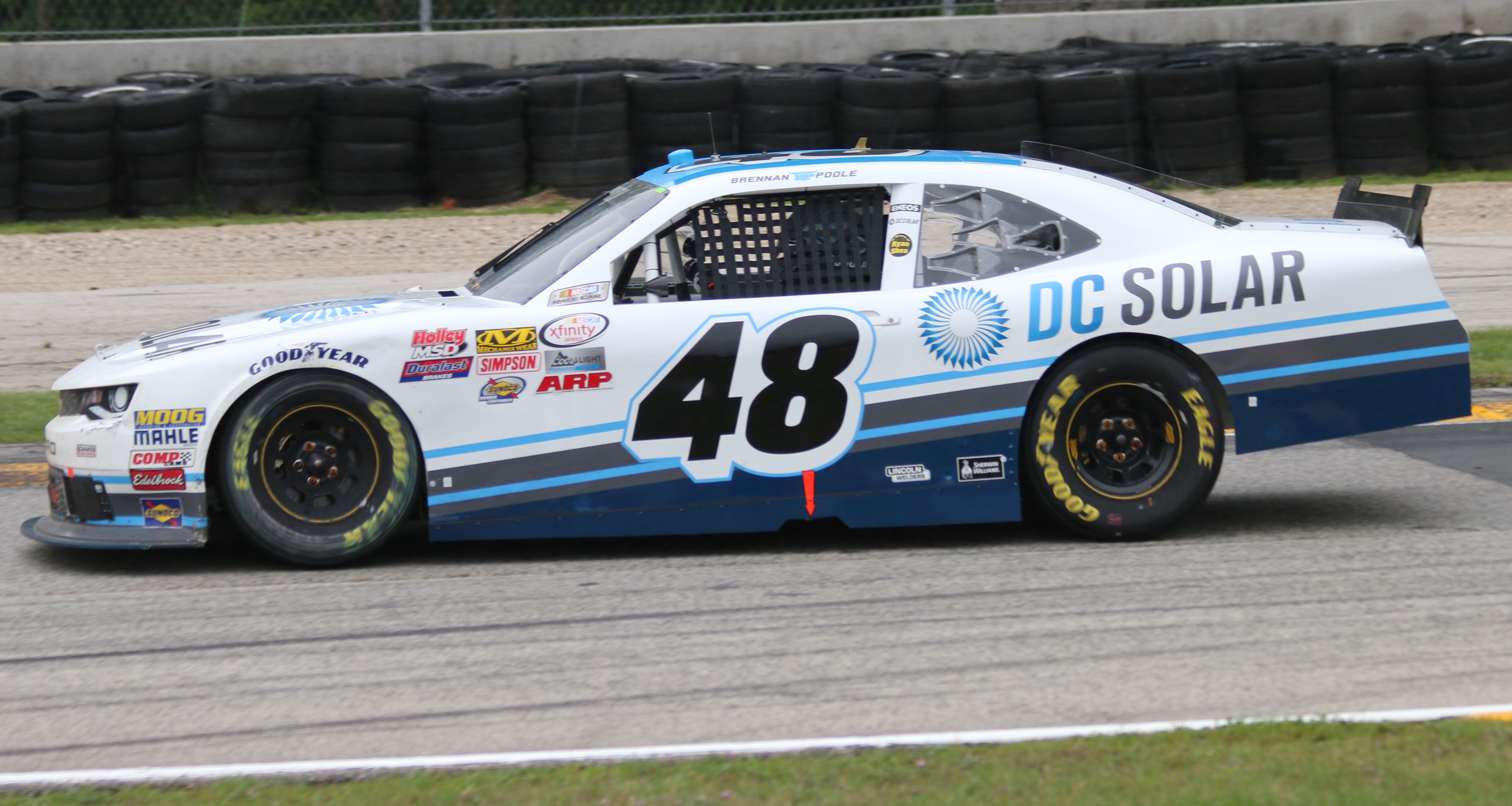
Brennan Poole at Road America in 2016.

For 2016, Brennan Poole, who drove a part-time schedule in Ganassi's No. 42 the previous season, moved into a new No. 48 car full-time with DC Solar sponsoring the full season. Chad Norris is the crew chief for the No. 48. Poole's best finish thus far has been a second-place finish at Kentucky. He also almost won the 2016 spring race in Talladega in which he passed two cars on the final lap, only to be told that he had in fact finished third after a yellow-flag came out on the final lap.

It was announced before the end of 2017 that Poole would not return in 2018, and after the season was over, CGR shut down the #48 team, focusing their Xfinity operation solely on the #42.

On June 18, 2018, it was announced that Poole would sue Chip Ganassi Racing and Spire Sports + Entertainment for breach of contract, alleging that CGR and Spire conspired to take away DC Solar's sponsorship from Poole and move it to the No. 42 CGR Cup Series team of Kyle Larson and that Spire's involvement representing both driver and team constituted a conflict of interest. Ganassi and Spire both released statements through attorneys denying the claims, with CGR's statement saying the sponsorship of Poole ended "because he never won a race despite the advantages of the best equipment in the garage." The dispute was later settled in the aftermath of DC Solar's FBI raid, though terms were not specified.

== Partnerships ==
=== Richard Childress Racing ===
Earnhardt-Childress Racing Technologies was formed in May 2007 as a cooperation between Dale Earnhardt, Inc. and Richard Childress Racing to develop and build common engines for the Chevrolet Monster Energy NASCAR Cup Series and Xfinity Series teams campaigned by the two companies. The partnership was inherited by CGR following its merger with DEI. The company is now known as ECR Engines, no longer connected with DEI or CGR.

=== Hendrick Motorsports ===
On November 2, 2012, Chip Ganassi Racing announced that it would get its engine supply from Hendrick Motorsports whilst retaining its Chevrolet stable.

=== Turner Scott Motorsports ===
Turner Scott Motorsports ran Ganassi development drivers in the NASCAR Xfinity Series and NASCAR Camping World Truck Series. They were Kyle Larson and Dylan Kwasniewski. Kwasniewski drove for TSM in the K&N Pro Series East before signing with Ganassi as a development driver. Ganassi would eventually assume complete control of the team's Xfinity program.
