= HANS device =

Auto racing safety and support apparel

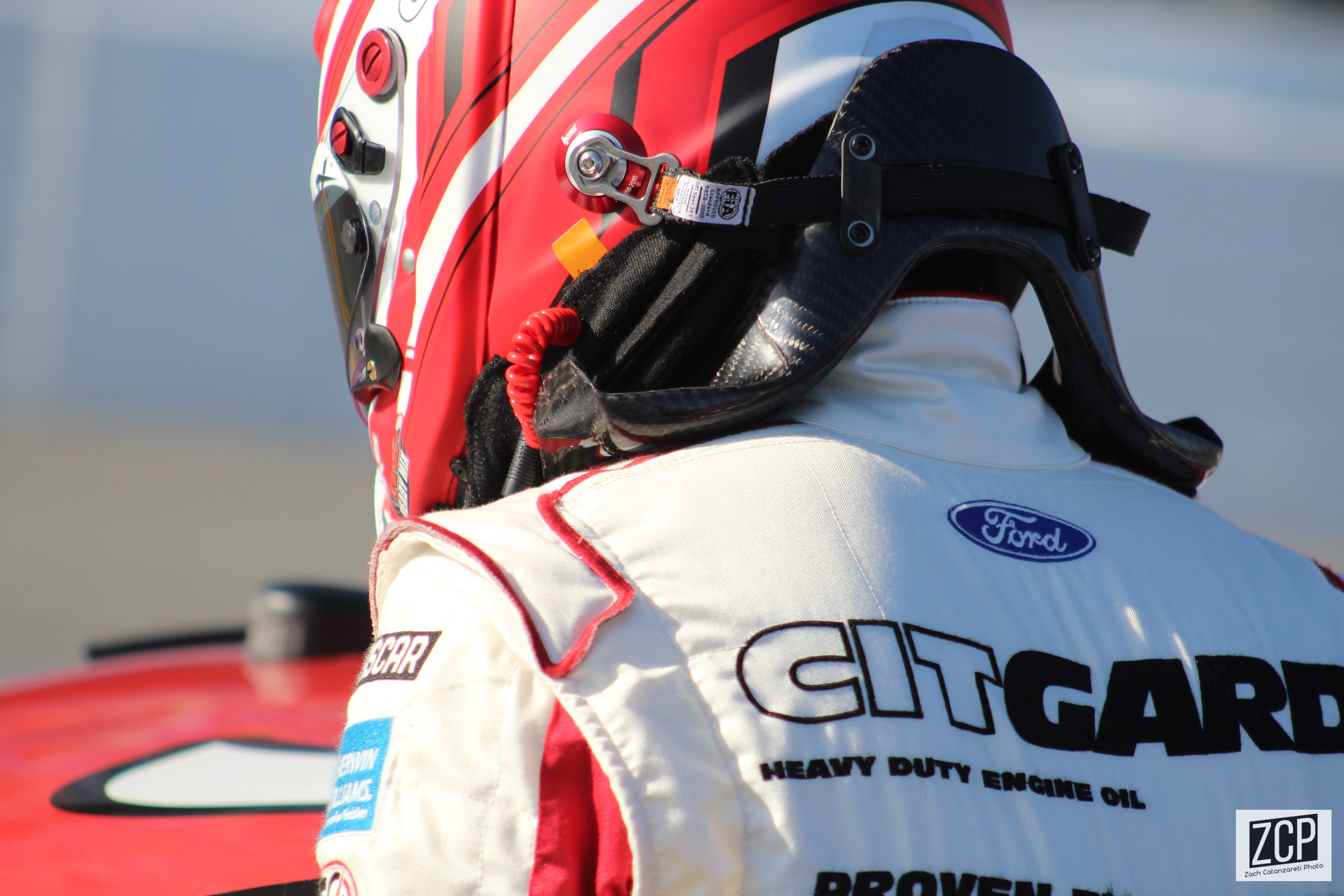
- NASCAR driver John Hunter Nemechek wearing a HANS Pro Ultra model device in 2020.
- Other names: Head and Neck Support Device
- Uses: Auto racing
- Used with: Helmet seatbelts
- Inventor: Dr. Robert Hubbard; Jim Downing
- Manufacturer: Simpson Performance Products
- Model: HANS I (1989); HANS II (2005); HANS III (2014); HANS IV (2024); HANS Pro Ultra (2015); HANS Zero (2019)
- Related: Hutchens device

A HANS device (head and neck support device) is a type of head restraint and a safety device in motorsports. Head restraints are mandatory when competing with most major motorsports sanctioning bodies. They reduce the likelihood of head or neck injuries, including basilar skull fracture, in the event of a crash. There are many such devices on the market today, like the Hutchens device now known as the Simpson Hybrid Device, but the HANS is the original and most commonly used name.

== Description ==
1. HANS device, 2. Tether (one per side), 3. Helmet anchor (one per side), and 4. Shoulder support.

Primarily made of carbon fiber reinforced polymer, the HANS device is shaped like a "U", with the back of the "U" set behind the nape of the neck and the two arms lying flat along the top of the chest over the pectoral muscles. The device, in general, is supported by the shoulders. It is attached only to the helmet, not to the belts, the driver's body, or the seat.

The helmet is attached to the device with the help of an anchor on each side, much like the Hutchens device, but placed slightly back. In a properly installed 5- or 6-point racing harness, the belts that cross the driver's upper body pass directly over the HANS device on the driver's shoulders and buckle at the center of the driver's abdomen. Therefore, the HANS device is secured by the body of the driver, not the seat.

The purpose of the HANS device is to keep the head from whipping in a crash, preventing excessive rotational movement as a secondary protection, without otherwise restricting movement of the neck. In other words, it allows the wearer's head to move normally, but prevents or restricts head movements during a crash that would exceed the normal articulation range of the musculoskeletal system and cause severe injury.

In any kind of crash, the person's body, when not protected, is decelerated by the seat belt, with the head maintaining velocity until it is decelerated by the neck. The HANS device maintains the relative position of the head to the body, in addition to transferring energy to the much stronger chest, torso, shoulder, seat belts, and seat as the head is decelerated.

== History ==
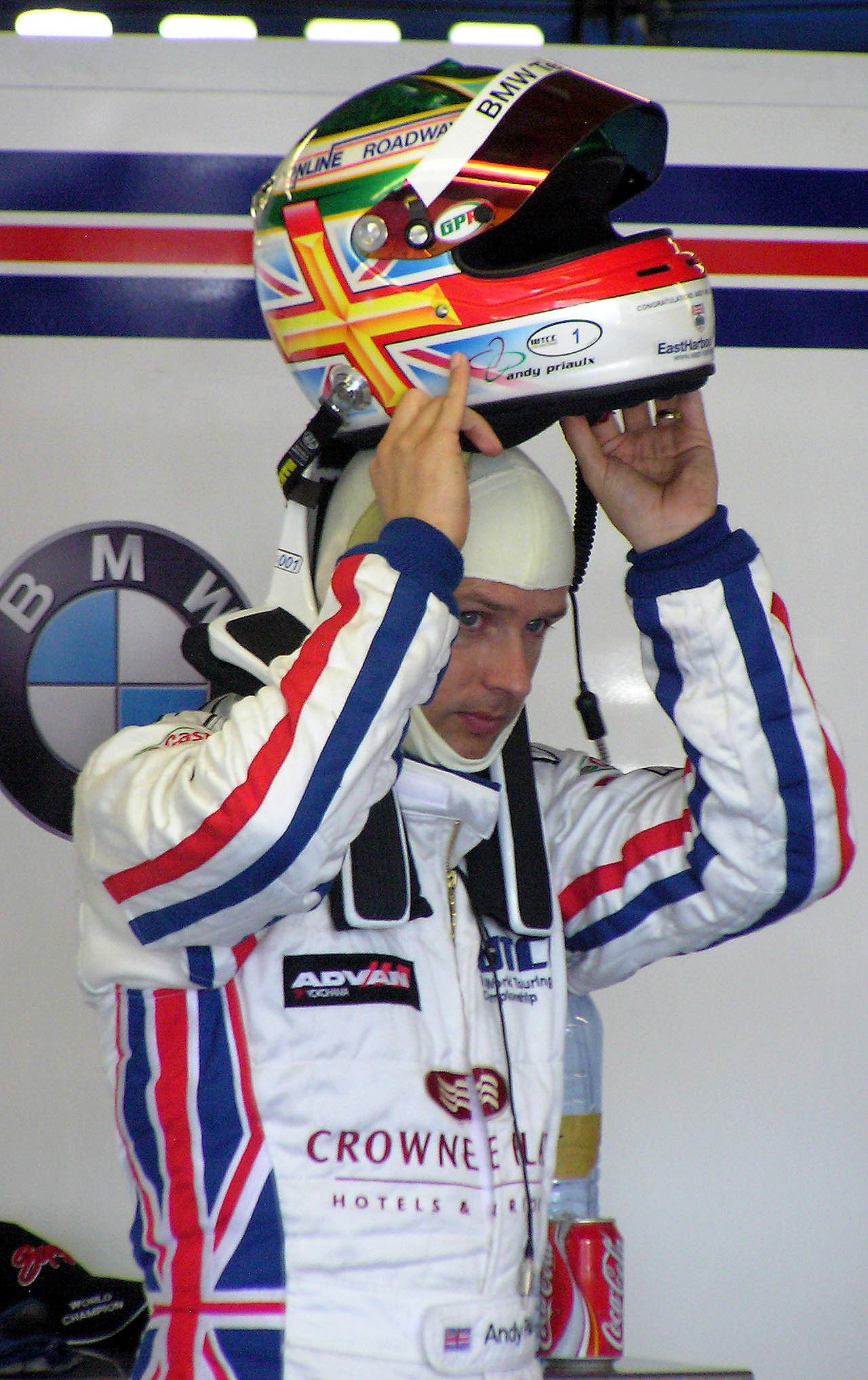
2005, 2006, and 2007 WTCC Champion Andy Priaulx with a HANS device

The device was designed in the early 1980s by American scientist and researcher Dr. Robert Hubbard (1943–2019), a professor of biomechanical engineering at Michigan State University. After talking to his brother-in-law, accomplished American road-racer Jim Downing, following the death of Patrick Jacquemart, a mutual friend who was killed in a testing accident at the Mid-Ohio Sports Car Course, leaving him dead on arrival with head injuries,

IMSA officials decided that some sort of protection was required to help prevent injuries from sudden stops, especially during accidents. A major cause of death among drivers during races was through violent head movements, where the body remains in place because of the seat belts, but the momentum keeps the head moving forward, causing a basilar skull fracture, resulting in serious injury or immediate death.

Notable race car drivers who died from basilar skull fractures include:

- Formula 1 driver Roland Ratzenberger in the 1994 San Marino Formula One Grand Prix
- IndyCar drivers Scott Brayton, Bill Vukovich and Tony Bettenhausen
- NASCAR drivers Adam Petty, Kenny Irwin Jr., Terry Schoonover, Grant Adcox, Neil Bonnett, John Nemechek, Dale Earnhardt, J. D. McDuffie, and Clifford Allison
- ARCA driver Blaise Alexander
- CART drivers Jovy Marcelo, Greg Moore, and Gonzalo Rodriguez
- Trans Am, Sports Car Club of America (SCCA) driver Jim Fitzgerald

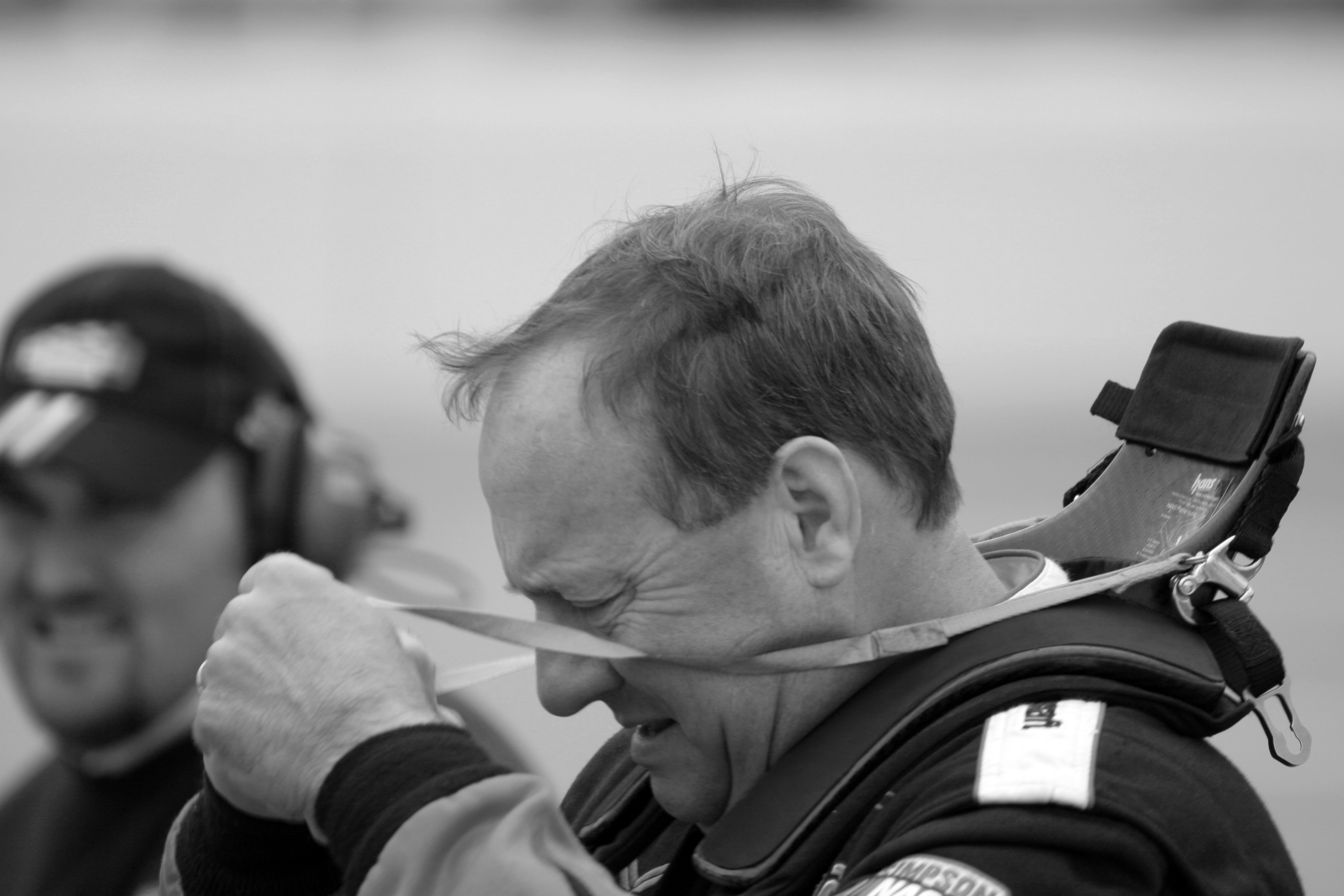
NASCAR driver Ken Schrader wearing a HANS device

While death from such injuries is usually immediate, some drivers have survived basilar skull fractures, such as NASCAR's Larry Pollard, Ernie Irvan, Stanley Smith, Rick Carelli and F1's Philippe Streiff.

Hubbard had extensive experience as a biomechanical crash engineer, including in General Motors' auto safety program. His first prototype was developed in 1985, and in crash tests in 1989 – the first to use crash sleds and crash dummies using race car seat belt harnesses – the energy exerted on the head and neck was lowered by approximately 80%. Prior tests had established the thresholds for acute basilar skull fracture to be 740 lbs of vertical neck tension and 700 lbs of forward neck shear; the HANS device greatly reduced both these values to 210 lbs. Neck compression was also reduced by about 28 millimetres.

After major racing safety companies declined to produce the product, Hubbard and Downing formed Hubbard Downing Inc., to develop, manufacture, sell and promote the HANS in 1990. The device is covered by United States patent 6,371,510, issued April 16, 2002, listing Hubbard and Downing as inventors.

The product languished until 1994, when Formula One showed interest in the wake of the deaths of Roland Ratzenberger and Ayrton Senna. In 1999, CART driver Gonzalo Rodríguez was killed after suffering a basilar skull fracture in a crash. At the same time, Mercedes was completing research of the HANS on behalf of the FIA for Formula One, finally deciding that it out-performed their airbag project.

The device was first adopted by the National Hot Rod Association (NHRA) in 1996, following the death of Top Fuel driver Blaine Johnson, though was not mandatory in the series until 2004, after the death of 2003 Top Fuel Rookie of the Year Darrell Russell, who was killed by flying debris during the Sears Craftsman Nationals in Madison, Illinois. Other racing series were also slow to follow suit. Many drivers resisted the HANS devices or anything that was similar to them, claiming that they were uncomfortable and more restrictive.

There were also fears that it would cause more injuries and problems than it prevented. Some even stated that the positioning of the device made the seat belts feel less secure or rubbed on the shoulders or the collar bone. Earnhardt referred to the device as "that damn noose", claiming the tethers would more likely hang him than save him in the event of a crash.

On February 18, 2001, Dale Earnhardt was killed on the last lap of the Daytona 500. Earnhardt was the fourth NASCAR driver killed by basilar skull fractures in an eight-month span, following Adam Petty in May 2000, Kenny Irwin Jr. in July 2000, and Tony Roper in October 2000. While Earnhardt's death was the result of multiple safety issues taking place at once, having a broken seat belt and the lack of a head and neck restraint, one thing remained true, he died of a basilar skull fracture. In the wake of his death, most agreed, this likely would have been prevented by the proper use of belts and a head and neck restraint.

Media members immediately turned focus to the HANS device after Earnhardt's death. HANS device co-founder Hubbard was quoted:

"... (I was) shocked by that. I recorded about 80 entries in my telephone log the first day [after the fatal accident]. And I didn't even write them all down. I was on national television ten times that Monday. I had been down in Florida and came home on Friday and went cross-country skiing in Michigan. So, I didn't know he died until I got home and there was a voicemail on my answering machine at 10 o'clock at night. I actually had two interviews that night before I went to bed."

Even after Earnhardt's death, use of the HANS device or similar products was resisted. The following weekend, Mark Martin said at Rockingham, "I would not wear one for anything. I'll just keep my fingers crossed and take my chances".

Following an extensive investigation into Earnhardt’s death that ended in August 2001, NASCAR did not make any immediate changes regarding use of HANS. Then on October 4, 2001, in an Automobile Racing Club of America (ARCA) race being held in conjunction with the fall NASCAR racing weekend at the Charlotte Motor Speedway, Blaise Alexander was killed in a two-car incident while battling for the lead in the final laps of the race. NASCAR mandated use of the HANS device in its top three series on October 17, 2001.

Formula One mandated HANS devices in 2003 after extensive testing by Mercedes from 1996 to 1998, sharing the results with other Fédération Internationale de l'Automobile (FIA) affiliates. Using that information, CART made the device compulsory for oval tracks in 2001, and subsequently requiring the HANS devices for all circuits the following season. Starting in October 2001, NASCAR mandated the use of either the HANS or Hutchens device, changing to the HANS device exclusively starting in 2005. ARCA also followed suit in the wake of Alexander's death. The World Rally Championship and Australian V8 Supercar Series made the device compulsory for drivers in the 2005 season.

Acceptance by drivers was helped by the addition of quick-release shackles developed and implemented by Ashley Tilling. They were sourced from the marine industry, being used on racing sailboat rigging. The shackles allowed the drivers a simple and quick pull to release the HANS device and exit their vehicle. The first driver to utilize them was NASCAR driver Scott Pruett of PPI Motorsports. Such shackles were also used on the Hutchens device and others.

Beginning in July 2007, many sanctioning bodies have approved any head-and-neck restraint that passes the SFI Foundation Specification 38.1 standard. These include the HANS device, the Moto-R Sport, the R3, the Hutch-II, the Hutchens Hybrid, or the Hybrid X.

Today, most major auto racing sanctioning bodies mandate the use of head and neck restraints; the FIA has made HANS devices use compulsory for all International-level events from the beginning of 2009. Even monster truck drivers use the HANS device in many events. Grassroots Motorsports awarded the HANS device the Editors' Choice award in 2002. Autosport magazine also awarded HANS their pioneering and innovation award in 2007.

In 2016, Hubbard and Downing, along with FIA's Hubert Gramling, were awarded the initial "SAE International Award for Motorsport Safety Honoring John Melvin" for their lifesaving work on the HANS Device.

Awards
Preceded by Audi R10 TDI	Autosport; Pioneering and Innovation Award; 2007	Succeeded by 2008 Singapore GP
