= Blaise Alexander =

American racing driver (1976–2001)

- Born: Blaise Robert Alexander Jr. March 26, 1976; State College, Pennsylvania, U.S.
- Died: October 4, 2001 (aged 25); Lowe's Motor Speedway; Concord, North Carolina, U.S.
- Cause of death: Basilar skull fracture caused by race car crash
- Awards: 1996 ARCA Rookie of the Year

NASCAR O'Reilly Auto Parts Series career
- 65 races run over 5 years
- Best finish: 25th (2000)
- First race: 1997 Kenwood Home & Car Audio 300 (California)
- Last race: 2001 MBNA.com 200 (Dover)
Wins	Top tens	Poles
0	2	0

NASCAR FedEx Freight Truck Series career
- 2 races run over 1 year
- Best finish: 53rd (1997)
- First race: 1997 Loadhandler 200 (Bristol)
- Last race: 1997 Parts America 150 (Watkins Glen)
Wins	Top tens	Poles
0	1	0

ARCA Menards Series career
- 68 races run over 6 years
- Best finish: 5th (1996)
- First race: 1995 ARCA 200 (Daytona)
- Last race: 2001 EasyCare Vehicle Services Contracts 100 (Lowe's)
- First win: 1999 Jasper Engines & Transmissions 150 (Toledo)
- Last win: 2001 Michigan ARCA Re/Max 200 (Michigan)
Wins	Top tens	Poles
3	38	4

Blaise Robert Alexander Jr. (March 26, 1976 – October 4, 2001) was an American racing driver. He began racing at the age of twelve in go-karts, winning the coveted World Karting Association East Regional championship in 1992. In 1995, he moved south to Mooresville, North Carolina, and drove in the ARCA Racing Series. Named ARCA's rookie of the year in 1996, Alexander was a regular driver in that series while also driving in both the NASCAR Busch Series and Craftsman Truck Series.

On October 4, 2001, during the ARCA EasyCare 100 at Lowe's Motor Speedway, Alexander's car crashed into the outside retaining wall nearly head-on. He died from a basilar skull fracture, the fifth driver death from rapid-deceleration head-and-neck movements in 17 months, convincing NASCAR to mandate the HANS or Hutchens devices for all drivers, despite the accident happening in ARCA.

== Early life ==
Alexander was born on March 26, 1976, in State College, Pennsylvania. He was the son of Blaise Alexander Sr., founder and CEO of Blaise Alexander Family Dealerships, and Anne Alexander who was a nurse. He had two brothers and one sister. The family moved to Montoursville, Pennsylvania in 1980.

He began his stock car career at the age of twelve in the World Karting Association and was the champion of the East Series in 1992. From that point, Alexander moved onto the Micro-Sprint racing series at tracks in different states including Pennsylvania, Ohio, and New York, posting a total of 48 wins in the series. In 1995, Alexander moved from Montoursville to Mooresville, North Carolina, to pursue a racing career.

== Racing career ==
=== ARCA ===
Alexander drove a few races in the ARCA Re-Max Series in 1995. With a full season in 1996, Alexander won ARCA's Rookie of the Year Award. During his 1996 rookie season, Alexander pulled off a second-place finish at Lowe's Motor Speedway. Alexander achieved two more second-place finishes in 1997. Alexander won his first ARCA race in 1999 at Toledo Speedway and won a second race the same year at Pocono Raceway. He led in eighteen ARCA races for a total of 490 laps led. Alexander's final win came in July 2001, at Michigan International Speedway. Alexander earned a total of four career pole awards, in races at Michigan, Watkins Glen, Toledo and Winchester.

=== NASCAR ===
In 1997, still running fifteen races in ARCA, Alexander began driving in NASCAR in the Busch Series and the Craftsman Truck Series. He only raced twice in the truck series, and had modest success in Busch. Alexander signed to run for Team SABCO during the 2000 Busch season, posting two top-ten finishes and finishing 25th in points. After that year, he decided to return to the ARCA series in 2001.

== Death ==
At the EasyCare 100 at Lowe's Motor Speedway on October 4, 2001, Alexander was involved in a two-car accident during lap 63 of the race. He was fighting for the lead position with Kerry Earnhardt for most of the race. During the lap, Earnhardt had to dodge a lapped car by hitting his brakes, which caused Alexander's No. 75 to catch up to Earnhardt's No. 2. Alexander began to inch into the lead when Earnhardt's car made contact with Alexander's, sending Alexander's car head-on into the wall and then back into Earnhardt's car, causing Earnhardt to flip over onto his roof and slide into the grass. After the wreck, Earnhardt got away unharmed, while Alexander was knocked unconscious. The ARCA race officials quickly threw out the red flag to send rescue workers onto the track to check on Alexander. Earnhardt had already got out of his car and wanted to go check on Alexander, a friend of his. Officials would not allow Earnhardt to see him and was taken to the infield care center. Alexander was pronounced dead at the infield care center at 10:20 PM. He was 25 years old. Alexander was interred at the Our Lady of Lourdes Catholic Church in Montoursville, Pennsylvania.

=== Aftermath ===
Alexander's death, caused by a basilar skull fracture sustained in the impact, was the sixth in two years. Other high-profile drivers killed in this period included Dale Earnhardt (Kerry Earnhardt's father, who was killed in February that same year), Adam Petty, Kenny Irwin Jr. and Tony Roper. As a result of Alexander's crash, NASCAR announced that the use of head and neck restraint devices would be required to keep drivers safe from these types of injuries, caused by rapid deceleration in wrecks. The use of such devices had been optional up until Alexander's death, though 41 out of 43 drivers in NASCAR's top series were already using them; only Tony Stewart and Jimmy Spencer had not worn them yet.

In response to these deaths, NASCAR eventually installed SAFER barriers on all NASCAR oval tracks. As of 2026, most tracks have the exterior and interior walls covered with the barriers.

==== Legacy ====
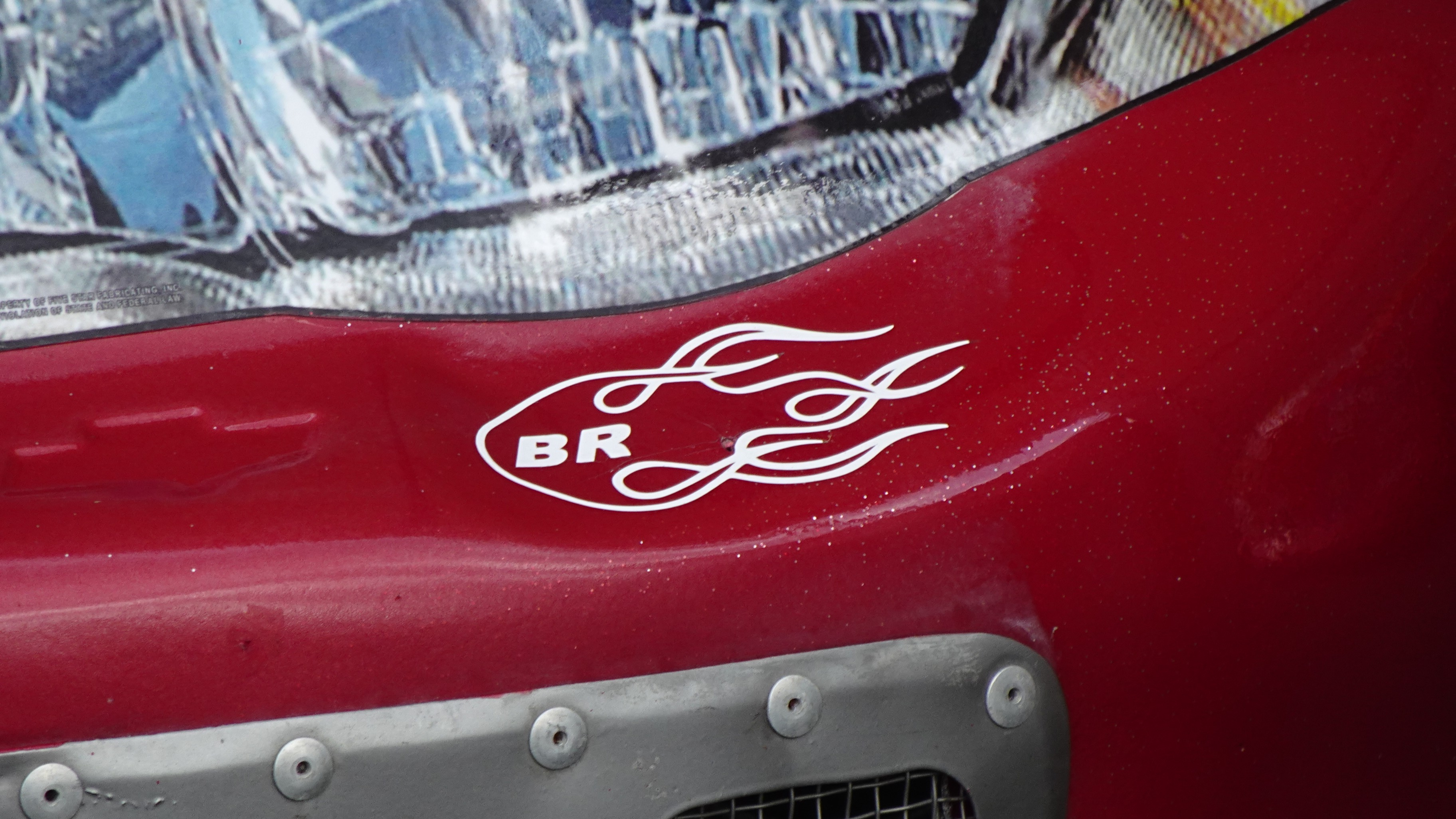
Tribute decal to Alexander

After his 1995 move to North Carolina, Alexander enjoyed a close friendship with fellow Busch rookie driver and eventual NASCAR superstar, Jimmie Johnson, as they competed against each other on the track, while supporting each other off it. Other close relations included Spencer, a fellow Pennsylvanian who served as his mentor, and IndyCar driver P. J. Jones.

Alexander's memory has been honored by Johnson in several public and private ways. He dedicated his first Cup win to Alexander during a televised interview in Victory Lane, sent condolences in a Victory Lane interview after the death of Alexander's mother, and supported various charity causes and events that Alexander initiated in his hometown area of Central Pennsylvania. Shortly after Alexander's death, one of Johnson's crewmen drew a flame pattern with Alexander's initials on his driver's front left bumper; the tribute was continued in the form of a decal on Johnson's Cup cars.

== Motorsports career results ==
=== NASCAR ===
(key) (Bold – Pole position awarded by qualifying time. Italics – Pole position earned by points standings or practice time. * – Most laps led.)

==== Winston Cup Series ====
NASCAR Winston Cup Series results
Year	Team	No.	Make	1	2	3	4	5	6	7	8	9	10	11	12	13	14	15	16	17	18	19	20	21	22	23	24	25	26	27	28	29	30	31	32	33	34	NWCC	Pts	Ref
2000	LJ Racing	91	Chevy	DAY	CAR	LVS	ATL	DAR	BRI	TEX	MAR	TAL	CAL	RCH	CLT	DOV	MCH	POC	SON	DAY	NHA	POC	IND	GLN	MCH	BRI	DAR	RCH	NHA	DOV	MAR	CLT	TAL; DNQ	CAR	PHO	HOM	ATL; DNQ	NA	-	

==== Busch Series ====
NASCAR Busch Series results
Year	Team	No.	Make	1	2	3	4	5	6	7	8	9	10	11	12	13	14	15	16	17	18	19	20	21	22	23	24	25	26	27	28	29	30	31	32	33	NBSC	Pts	Ref
1997	Keystone Motorsports	20	Chevy	DAY	CAR	RCH	ATL	LVS	DAR	HCY	TEX	BRI	NSV	TAL	NHA	NZH	CLT	DOV	SBO	GLN	MLW	MYB	GTY	IRP	MCH	BRI	DAR	RCH	DOV	CLT	CAL; 20	CAR; 24					77th	194	
1997	Key Motorsports	11	Chevy																														HOM; DNQ				77th	194	
1998	Keystone Motorsports	20	Chevy	DAY; DNQ	CAR; 23	LVS; 25	NSV; 21	DAR; 12	BRI; 35	TEX; 33	HCY; DNQ	TAL; 14	NHA; 26	NZH; 38	CLT; DNQ	DOV; 38	RCH; DNQ	PPR; 27	GLN; 43	MLW; 27	MYB; DNQ	CAL; 35	SBO	IRP	MCH; 20	BRI; 41	DAR; 37	RCH; 42	DOV; 26	CLT; 40	GTY; 33	CAR; 31	ATL; 39	HOM; 23			32nd	1730	
1999	Blaise Alexander Racing	20	Chevy	DAY; DNQ	CAR	LVS	ATL	DAR	TEX	NSV	BRI	TAL	CAL	NHA	RCH	NZH	CLT; 24	DOV	SBO	GLN	MLW	MYB	PPR	GTY	IRP	MCH	BRI	DAR	RCH	DOV							91st	158	
1999	Sterling Marlin Racing	14	Chevy																												CLT; 32	CAR	MEM	PHO	HOM		91st	158	
2000	SABCO Racing	81	Chevy	DAY; DNQ	CAR; 30	LVS; 21	ATL; 7	DAR; 28	BRI; 23	TEX; 18	NSV; 28	TAL; 30	CAL; 38	RCH; 31	NHA; 40	CLT; 10	DOV; 31	SBO; 27	MYB; 34	GLN; 13	MLW; 18	NZH; 26	PPR; 22	GTY; 35	IRP; 16	MCH; 39	BRI; 41	DAR; 35	RCH; 18	DOV; 21	CLT; 30	CAR; 34	MEM; 31	PHO; 38	HOM; 28		25th	2540	
2001	HighLine Performance Group	8	Chevy	DAY; 30	CAR; 16	LVS; 43	ATL; 12	DAR	BRI	TEX	NSH	TAL	CAL	RCH	NHA	NZH	CLT	DOV	KEN	MLW	GLN	CHI	GTY	PPR	IRP												54th	558	
2001	Carroll Racing	08	Chevy																							MCH; 11	BRI	DAR	RCH	DOV; 28	KAN	CLT	MEM	PHO	CAR	HOM	54th	558	

==== Craftsman Truck Series ====
NASCAR Craftsman Truck Series results
Year	Team	No.	Make	1	2	3	4	5	6	7	8	9	10	11	12	13	14	15	16	17	18	19	20	21	22	23	24	25	26	NCTC	Pts	Ref
1997	Blaise Alexander Racing	62	Chevy	WDW	TUS	HOM; DNQ	PHO	POR	EVG	I70	NHA	TEX	BRI; 14	NZH	MLW	LVL	CNS	HPT	IRP	FLM	NSV; DNQ	GLN; 9	RCH	MAR; DNQ	SON	MMR	CAL	PHO	LVS	53rd	373	

=== ARCA Re/Max Series ===
(key) (Bold – Pole position awarded by qualifying time. Italics – Pole position earned by points standings or practice time. * – Most laps led.)

ARCA Re/Max Series results
Year	Team	No.	Make	1	2	3	4	5	6	7	8	9	10	11	12	13	14	15	16	17	18	19	20	21	22	23	24	25	ARMC	Pts	Ref
1995	Blaise Alexander Racing	26	Chevy	DAY; 12	ATL	TAL; 13	FIF	KIL	FRS	MCH	I80	MCS	FRS	POC; 5	POC; 33	KIL	FRS	SBS	LVL	ISF	DSF	SLM	WIN	ATL; 8					33rd	1045	
1996	Blaise Alexander Racing	26	Chevy	DAY; 27	ATL; 7	SLM; 9	TAL; 15	FIF; 7	LVL; 15	CLT; 2	CLT; 25	KIL; 3	FRS; 5	POC; 23	MCH; 6	FRS; 20	TOL; 11	POC; 4	MCH; 20	INF; 17	SBS; 3	ISF; 28	DSF; 27	KIL; 18	SLM; 3	WIN; 8	CLT; 35	ATL; 33	5th	5325	
1997	Blaise Alexander Racing	26	Chevy	DAY; 37	ATL; 17	SLM; 22	CLT; 39	CLT; 24	POC; 30	MCH; 6	SBS	TOL; 2	KIL; 2	FRS	MIN; 2	POC; 3	MCH; 7	DSF	GTW; 6	SLM; 6	WIN	CLT; 34	TAL	ISF	ATL				9th	2655	
1998	Keystone Motorsports	20	Chevy	DAY; 35	ATL	SLM	CLT	MEM	MCH																				NA	0	
1998	Mike Brandt	66	Ford							POC; 9	SBS	TOL	PPR	POC	KIL	FRS	ISF	ATL	DSF	SLM	TEX	WIN	CLT	TAL	ATL				NA	0	
1999	Baltes Racing	18	Chevy	DAY	ATL; 3	SLM																							16th	2330	
1999	Blaise Alexander Racing	97	Chevy				AND; 3	CLT; 14	MCH; 2	POC; 11	TOL; 1	SBS; 25	BLN	**POC**; 1*	KIL	FRS	FLM; 9	ISF	**WIN**; 2	DSF	SLM	CLT; 4	TAL	ATL; 26					16th	2330	
2001	LJ Racing	91	Chevy	DAY; 8	NSH																								23rd	1820	
2001	Gerhart Racing	7	Pontiac			WIN; 28																							23rd	1820	
2001	LJ Racing	91	Pontiac				SLM; 6	GTY	KEN	CLT	KAN	MCH; 6	POC; 9	MEM	**GLN**; 2	KEN		POC; 2	NSH	ISF	CHI	DSF	SLM	TOL	BLN				23rd	1820	
2001	Bob Schacht Motorsports	75	Pontiac														**MCH**; 1									CLT; 2	TAL	ATL	23rd	1820	

== See also ==
- Driver deaths in motorsport
