= Adam Petty =

American racing driver (1980–2000)

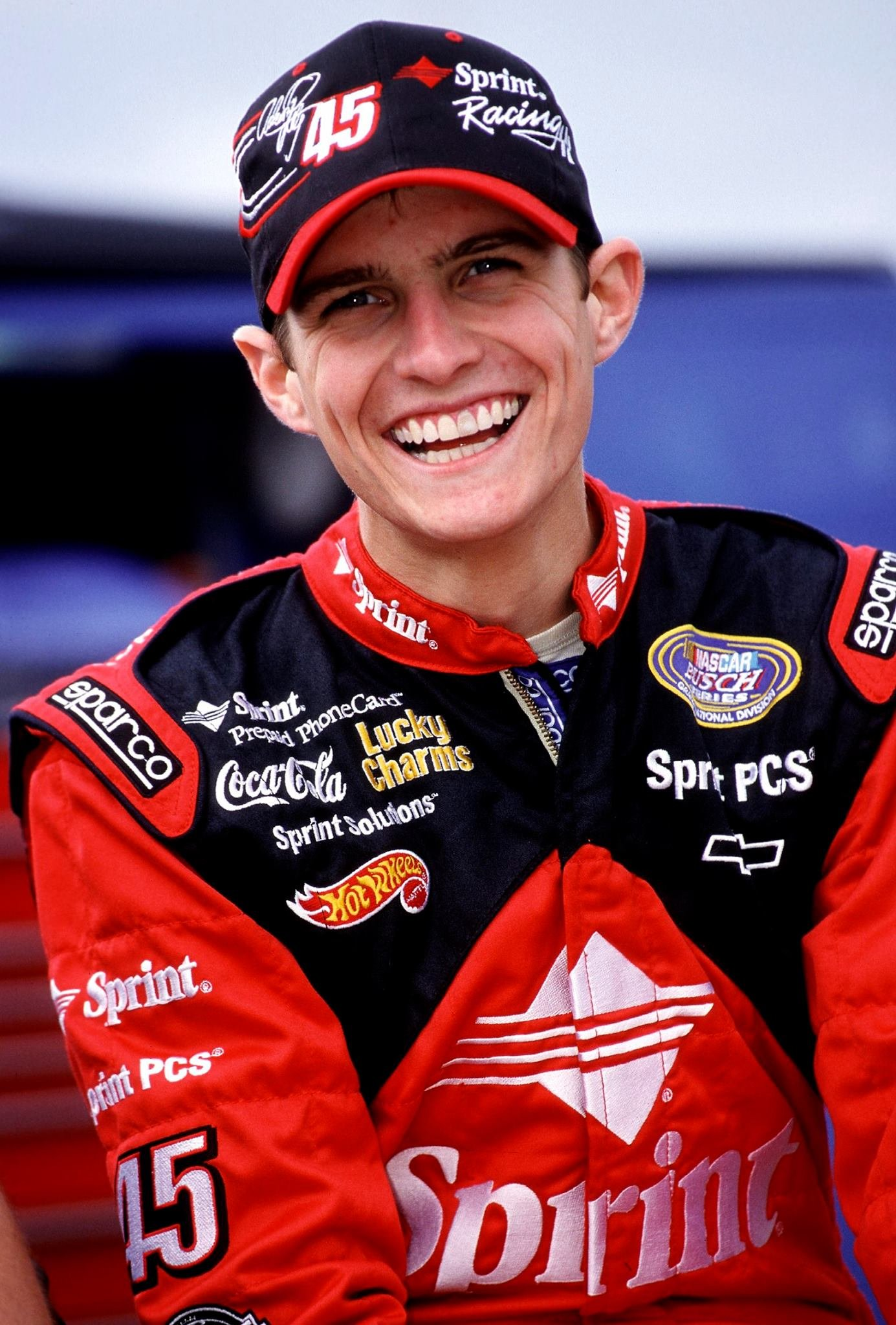
- Petty in 2000
- Born: Adam Kyler Petty; July 10, 1980; High Point, North Carolina, U.S.
- Died: May 12, 2000 (aged 19); Loudon, New Hampshire, U.S.
- Cause of death: Basilar skull fracture from crash in Turn 3 of practice for the 2000 Busch 200

NASCAR Cup Series career
- 1 race run over 1 year
- 2000 position: 68th
- Best finish: 68th (2000)
- First race: 2000 DirecTV 500 (Texas)
| Wins | Top tens | Poles |
|---|---|---|
| 0 | 0 | 0 |

NASCAR O'Reilly Auto Parts Series career
- 47 races run over 3 years
- Best finish: 20th (1999)
- First race: 1998 CarQuest Auto Parts 250 (Gateway)
- Last race: 2000 Hardee's 250 (Richmond)
| Wins | Top tens | Poles |
|---|---|---|
| 0 | 4 | 0 |

NASCAR FedEx Freight Truck Series career
- 2 races run over 1 year
- Best finish: 58th (1999)
- First race: 1999 Virginia Is For Lovers 200 (Richmond)
- Last race: 1999 O'Reilly 300 (Texas)
| Wins | Top tens | Poles |
|---|---|---|
| 0 | 1 | 0 |

Adam Kyler Petty (July 10, 1980 – May 12, 2000) was an American professional stock car racing driver. A member of the Petty racing family, he was the fourth generation from the Petty family to drive in races in the highest division of NASCAR racing, mostly in what was then known as the NASCAR Busch Series. He was believed to be the first fourth-generation athlete in all of modern American professional sports.

== Early life ==
Petty was raised in High Point, North Carolina, into stock car racing "royalty." The son of Kyle Petty, he was widely expected to become the next great Petty, following in the footsteps of his father, grandfather Richard, and great grandfather Lee.

== Racing career ==
Petty began his career in 1998, shortly after he turned eighteen, in the ARCA RE/MAX Series. Like his father Kyle, he won his first ARCA race, driving the No. 45 Pontiac at Lowe's Motor Speedway. Petty moved to NASCAR Busch Series full-time in 1999, driving the No. 45 Chevrolet. Petty finished sixth in his first Busch Series race at Daytona and had a best finish of fourth place at Fontana, though he also failed to qualify for three of the Busch races. Petty finished the 1999 season 20th overall in points.

Petty Enterprises planned to have Petty run a second Busch season in 2000, while giving him seven starts in the 2000 NASCAR Winston Cup Series, in preparation for a full Winston Cup campaign in 2001. He struggled early in the Busch season, but managed to qualify in his first attempt at Winston Cup during the DirecTV 500 at Texas Motor Speedway on April 2. He qualified 33rd and ran in the middle of the pack most of the day before his engine expired, forcing him to finish fortieth. Adam never got to race alongside his father. Kyle failed to qualify and eventually relieved an ill Elliott Sadler, but Adam was already out of the race. Lee Petty, Adam's great-grandfather, and three-time NASCAR champion, lived to see his Winston Cup debut, but died just three days later.

== Death ==
On May 12, 2000, in a practice session for the Busch 200 race at New Hampshire Motor Speedway, which would have been his 48th career Busch Series start, Petty's throttle had stuck wide open going into the third turn of the track, causing the car to hit the outside wall virtually head on, killing him instantly as he developed a basilar skull fracture. He was nineteen years old.

Petty's death, along with the death of Kenny Irwin Jr. in the same corner at the same track eight weeks later, led NASCAR to mandate the use of a kill switch on the steering wheel and the adoption of the Whelen Modified Tour restrictor plate for the September Cup race; which was abandoned following the race, in which Jeff Burton led all the laps to win. Both adjustments addressed the cause of the deadly accidents, with the exception of the basilar skull fractures suffered by both drivers. At Texas Motor Speedway, Truck Series driver Tony Roper died on October 14, 2000, of a similar skull fracture. Use of the HANS or Hutchens device (designed to prevent the rapid-deceleration head-and-neck movements associated with the injuries and skull fractures associated with the Petty, Irwin, Jr., and Roper deaths) was mandated by NASCAR in October 2001, following the later deaths of seven-time Winston Cup champion Dale Earnhardt on the last lap of the Daytona 500 on February 18, 2001, and ARCA RE/MAX Series competitor Blaise Alexander during ARCA EasyCare 100 at Charlotte Motor Speedway on October 4, 2001, both of whom died from the same fatal skull injuries. In 2002, oval tracks hosting NASCAR and IndyCar races also adopted the SAFER barriers jointly developed by University of Nebraska–Lincoln and Indianapolis Motor Speedway; drivers had requested installation of soft walls prior to the September New Hampshire Cup race.

Adam's father, Kyle Petty, who had driven the No. 44 Hot Wheels-sponsored Pontiac Grand Prix Winston Cup car at the time of his son's fatal crash at New Hampshire, chose to take over Adam's No. 45 car in the Busch Series for the remainder of 2000, with Steve Grissom taking the wheel of the blue No. 44 Pontiac. He then used the No. 45 in the Cup Series throughout the rest of his driving career during most of the 2000s decade. Kyle Petty later admitted he struggled with a personal depression during the 2001 Cup Series season about the loss of his son, which partly resulted in his poor finish in the 2001 Cup standings, but inspiring him to keep on driving the 45 car paying his tributes to Adam.

== Legacy ==
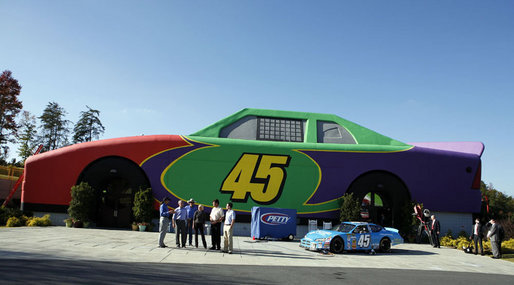
President George W. Bush is joined at Adam's Race Shop on the grounds of Victory Junction Gang Camp, Inc., in Randleman, N.C., by Kyle and Richard Petty, Michael Waltrip and Jimmie Johnson.

In October 2000, five months after Petty's death, his family partnered with Paul Newman and the Hole in the Wall Gang Camp to begin the Victory Junction Gang Camp in Randleman, North Carolina, as a memorial to Petty. The camp has received support from many NASCAR drivers, teams, and sponsors, including Cup Series sponsor Sprint, which has placed a replica of Petty's 1998 car in the camp. The camp began operation in 2004 and is an official charity of NASCAR.

Petty also appears as a special guest driver in the video games NASCAR 2000, NASCAR Rumble, NASCAR 2001 and NASCAR Arcade. Both NASCAR 2001 and NASCAR Heat include tributes to both him and Irwin Jr.

In December 2013, Adam's brother Austin named his newborn son after Adam in tribute.

The car number 45, which was driven by Petty, is currently used by 23XI Racing to represent the jersey number worn by co-owner Michael Jordan. Kurt Busch drove the 45 car to victory at Kansas Speedway in 2022, and dedicated his win to Petty. Bubba Wallace and Tyler Reddick have also won races while driving the 45 car.

== Motorsports career results ==
=== NASCAR ===
(key) (Bold – Pole position awarded by qualifying time. Italics – Pole position earned by points standings or practice time. * – Most laps led.)

==== Winston Cup Series ====
NASCAR Winston Cup Series results
| Year | Team | No. | Make | 1 | 2 | 3 | 4 | 5 | 6 | 7 | 8 | 9 | 10 | 11 | 12 | 13 | 14 | 15 | 16 | 17 | 18 | 19 | 20 | 21 | 22 | 23 | 24 | 25 | 26 | 27 | 28 | 29 | 30 | 31 | 32 | 33 | 34 | NWCC | Pts | Ref |
|---|---|---|---|---|---|---|---|---|---|---|---|---|---|---|---|---|---|---|---|---|---|---|---|---|---|---|---|---|---|---|---|---|---|---|---|---|---|---|---|---|
| 2000 | Petty Enterprises | 45 | Chevy | DAY | CAR | LVS | ATL | DAR | BRI | TEX; 40 | MAR | TAL | CAL | RCH | CLT | DOV | MCH | POC | SON | DAY | NHA | POC | IND | GLN | MCH | BRI | DAR | RCH | NHA | DOV | MAR | CLT | TAL | CAR | PHO | HOM | ATL | 68th | 43 | |

==== Busch Series ====
NASCAR Busch Series results
| Year | Team | No. | Make | 1 | 2 | 3 | 4 | 5 | 6 | 7 | 8 | 9 | 10 | 11 | 12 | 13 | 14 | 15 | 16 | 17 | 18 | 19 | 20 | 21 | 22 | 23 | 24 | 25 | 26 | 27 | 28 | 29 | 30 | 31 | 32 | NBSC | Pts | Ref |
|---|---|---|---|---|---|---|---|---|---|---|---|---|---|---|---|---|---|---|---|---|---|---|---|---|---|---|---|---|---|---|---|---|---|---|---|---|---|---|
| 1998 | ST Motorsports | 22 | Chevy | DAY | CAR | LVS | NSV | DAR | BRI | TEX | HCY | TAL | NHA | NZH | CLT | DOV | RCH | PPR | GLN | MLW | MYB | CAL | SBO | IRP | MCH | BRI | DAR | RCH | DOV | CLT | GTY; 27 | CAR; 38 | ATL | HOM; 27 | | 73rd | 213 | |
| 1999 | Petty Enterprises | 45 | Chevy | DAY; 6 | CAR; DNQ | | | DAR; 24 | TEX; 39 | NSV; 13 | BRI; 18 | TAL; 23 | CAL; 4 | NHA; 24 | RCH; 28 | NZH; 5 | CLT; 43 | DOV; 40 | SBO; 33 | GLN; 32 | MLW; 30 | MYB; DNQ | PPR; 29 | GTY; 34 | IRP; 27 | MCH; 35 | BRI; 22 | DAR; 15 | RCH; 40 | DOV; 30 | CLT; DNQ | CAR; 30 | MEM; 5 | PHO; 38 | HOM; 33 | 20th | 2471 | |
| 1999 | Petty Enterprises | 45 | Pontiac | | | LVS; 29 | ATL; 34 | | | | | | | | | | | | | | | | | | | | | | | | | | | | | 20th | 2471 | |
| 2000 | Petty Enterprises | 45 | Chevy | DAY; 37 | CAR; 27 | LVS; 17 | ATL; 25 | DAR; 16 | BRI; 40 | TEX; 39 | NSV; 34 | TAL; 12 | CAL; 27 | RCH; 16 | NHA; Wth | CLT | DOV | SBO | MYB | GLN | MLW | NZH | PPR | GTY | IRP | MCH | BRI | DAR | RCH | DOV | CLT | CAR | MEM | PHO | HOM | 47th | 928 | |

==== Craftsman Truck Series ====
NASCAR Craftsman Truck Series results
| Year | Team | No. | Make | 1 | 2 | 3 | 4 | 5 | 6 | 7 | 8 | 9 | 10 | 11 | 12 | 13 | 14 | 15 | 16 | 17 | 18 | 19 | 20 | 21 | 22 | 23 | 24 | 25 | NCTC | Pts | Ref |
|---|---|---|---|---|---|---|---|---|---|---|---|---|---|---|---|---|---|---|---|---|---|---|---|---|---|---|---|---|---|---|---|
| 1999 | Petty Enterprises | 34 | Dodge | HOM | PHO | EVG | MMR | MAR | MEM | PPR | I70 | BRI | TEX | PIR | GLN | MLW | NSV | NZH | MCH | NHA | IRP | GTY | HPT | RCH; 10 | LVS | LVL | TEX; 16 | CAL | 58th | 249 | |

=== ARCA Bondo/Mar-Hyde Series ===
(key) (Bold – Pole position awarded by qualifying time. Italics – Pole position earned by points standings or practice time. * – Most laps led.)

ARCA Bondo/Mar-Hyde Series results
| Year | Team | No. | Make | 1 | 2 | 3 | 4 | 5 | 6 | 7 | 8 | 9 | 10 | 11 | 12 | 13 | 14 | 15 | 16 | 17 | 18 | 19 | 20 | 21 | 22 | ABMSC | Pts | Ref |
|---|---|---|---|---|---|---|---|---|---|---|---|---|---|---|---|---|---|---|---|---|---|---|---|---|---|---|---|---|
| 1998 | Petty Enterprises | 45 | Pontiac | DAY | ATL | SLM | CLT | MEM | MCH | POC | SBS | TOL | PPR | POC | KIL | FRS | ISF | ATL | DSF | SLM | TEX | WIN | CLT; 1 | TAL; 29 | ATL | NA | - | |
