= Death of Dale Earnhardt =

Fatal auto racing accident

- Date: February 18, 2001; 25 years ago
- Time: 5:16 p.m. (US Eastern time (UTC−05:00))
- Venue: Daytona International Speedway
- Location: Daytona Beach, Florida, U.S.
- Type: Auto racing accident
- Cause: Basilar skull fracture as a result of an auto racing crash
- Outcome: Introduction of the Car of Tomorrow; Introduction of the SAFER barrier; Mandatory HANS device use
- Deaths: Dale Earnhardt

On February 18, 2001, American stock car racing driver and team owner Dale Earnhardt was involved in a fatal collision in the 2001 Daytona 500. In the final lap of the race, Earnhardt crashed into a retaining wall after making contact with Sterling Marlin and Ken Schrader. He was pronounced dead at Halifax Medical Center a short time later. The cause of death was a basilar skull fracture, which was determined to have killed him instantly.

Earnhardt's death was officially pronounced at the nearby Halifax Medical Center at 5:16 p.m. EST (22:16 UTC). At the time of the crash, he was 49 years old. His funeral was held four days later at the Calvary Church in Charlotte, North Carolina. Earnhardt was the fourth NASCAR driver killed by a basilar skull fracture during an eight-month span, following Adam Petty in May 2000, Kenny Irwin Jr. in July 2000, and Tony Roper in October 2000. Earnhardt's death, seen on a live television broadcast with more than 17 million viewers, was highly publicized and resulted in various safety improvements in NASCAR auto racing.

After Earnhardt's death, NASCAR began an intensive focus on driver safety, from mandating the use of head-and-neck restraints and installing SAFER barriers at oval tracks, setting rigorous new inspection rules for seats and seat belts, and developing a roof-hatch escape system and the Car of Tomorrow. This eventually led to the development of a next-generation car built with an emphasis on safety. No other driver fatalities have occurred in NASCAR's three major series following Earnhardt's death.

== Circumstances of Earnhardt's death ==
=== Rules of competition ===
Earnhardt died while competing in the 2001 Daytona 500, a NASCAR-sanctioned automobile race at Daytona International Speedway. NASCAR sanctions required the use of a carburetor restrictor plate for races held at that track as well as Talladega Superspeedway. In 2000, the year before Earnhardt died, NASCAR instituted additional restrictions to the springs and shocks used on the cars, causing Earnhardt to complain to the media, "[The rules] took Nascar Winston Cup racing and made it some of the sorriest racing. They took racing out of the hands of the drivers and the crews. We can't adjust and make our cars drive like we want. They just killed the racing at Daytona. This is a joke to have to race like this."

In response to criticism such as Earnhardt's, NASCAR developed a new aerodynamic package for the cars competing in Winston Cup Series races at Daytona and Talladega. In the initial running of this aerodynamic package at Talladega, Earnhardt passed 17 cars within four laps to win the fall 2000 Talladega race which proved to be his 76th and final career win. The 2001 Daytona 500 was the first 500-mile (800 km) race run at the track with this package, which was designed to keep cars bunched up close together and to allow more frequent passing at high speed.

=== Pre-race events ===
In the weeks before the Daytona 500, Earnhardt elected not to attend the annual fan and media preview event, drawing vocal criticism from fellow driver Jimmy Spencer. On February 3 and 4, 2001, for the first time in his career, Earnhardt participated in the Rolex 24 endurance race at Daytona, the event which kicks off Speedweeks at the track. Earnhardt and his teammates, Dale Earnhardt Jr. (Earnhardt's son), Andy Pilgrim and Kelly Collins, finished fourth overall and second in class.

=== Race events ===
The morning of the race, Earnhardt appeared confident and relaxed. He was a front-runner throughout the race, leading 17 laps. In the first three quarters of the race, there were only two caution flags: the first one on lap 49 when Jeff Purvis hit the wall exiting turn 4 and the other on lap 157 when rookie Kurt Busch hit the frontstretch wall while trying to pass Joe Nemechek and slid through the infield and onto pit road.

On lap 173, Earnhardt's car was in seventh place, with two of his team's cars, the blue No. 15 Chevrolet driven by Michael Waltrip and the red No. 8 Chevrolet driven by his son Dale Earnhardt Jr., running first and second in front of him. On that lap, a huge crash on the back straightaway eliminated 18 cars in a spectacular fashion. Those involved in the crash were Jason Leffler, Steve Park (another of Earnhardt's drivers), both Rusty (who would rally back to finish third) and Kenny Wallace, Jeff Gordon (the eventual Winston Cup champion for 2001) and Robby Gordon, both Bobby (the defending Winston Cup Champion) and Terry Labonte, Mark Martin, Tony Stewart, Elliott Sadler, Jeff Burton and Ward Burton (who had led the most laps in the race so far with 53), Jerry Nadeau, John Andretti, Buckshot Jones, Dale Jarrett (the defending Daytona 500 winner), and Andy Houston. The crash began when Robby Gordon turned into Ward Burton at the exit of turn 2. Stewart got hit by Ward, turned backwards against the outside wall, and was pushed airborne over Gordon. Stewart then flipped over twice, hooking to Bobby Labonte's hood, and stood on his front wheels before coasting to a stop in the infield, while Burton's car turned sideways and collected most of the field behind him. Earnhardt, Ron Hornaday Jr., Ricky Rudd, Ken Schrader, and Jeremy Mayfield were several of the drivers who escaped the crash scene. The race was red-flagged to allow for cleanup.

Between the time of the lap 173 crash and a lap 180 restart, Earnhardt conversed with his pit crew over the radio. Richard Childress, the owner of Earnhardt's car, described one remark made by Earnhardt during that time: "Richard, if they don't do something to these cars, it's gonna end up killing somebody."

During the ensuing caution, Earnhardt had his last conversation with his crew, between him and his Rolex 24 teammate Andy Pilgrim:

Earnhardt: So, you got any advice for me here coming up?
Pilgrim: No, man, I haven't got any advice for you. Just keep doing what you're doing.
Earnhardt: Okay, just wondering.
Pilgrim: Cheers; talk to you later.

Pilgrim related that there was no further crew conversation with Earnhardt, but that he did cheer on teammates Waltrip and Dale Jr. over the radio, up to the end of the race.

The race restarted on lap 180, with Waltrip and Earnhardt Jr. still out in front. Sterling Marlin, who had beaten Earnhardt in the Gatorade Duel, led the next three laps before Waltrip took the lead again. The lead changed several times between Waltrip and Earnhardt Jr. during the next few laps.

As the laps wound down, Waltrip and Earnhardt Jr. were running in first and second place, with Earnhardt Sr. behind them, blocking Marlin's attempts to pass. With less than two laps remaining, Fox commentator Darrell Waltrip noted that "Sterling had beat the front end off of that ol' Dodge (Marlin's car) just trying to get around Dale Earnhardt Sr."

==== Final lap crash ====
The accident occurred in turn 4, the final turn of the final lap, when Earnhardt made light contact with Marlin and slid off course. When Earnhardt attempted to regain control and turned back onto the track, he crossed in front of Schrader, hitting Schrader and dragging his car up the track. Earnhardt collided head-on into the retaining wall at a critical angle with his car going an estimated speed between 155 and 160 miles per hour (249 and 257 km/h), enough to break the right rear wheel assembly off the car. Upon impact, his hood pins severed, causing his hood to open and slam up against the windshield multiple times. As Michael Waltrip and Dale Earnhardt Jr. were about to complete the race, both of the wrecked cars went down the steep banking and slid into the infield grass near the exit of turn 4. All other drivers were able to make it past them without incident. After both cars came to a stop on the infield, Schrader climbed out of his car uninjured and went to check on Earnhardt. Earnhardt's window net was still up, and Schrader pulled it down himself, then frantically signaled for paramedics who were just arriving at the crash site. That day, and in retellings of the events, Schrader described what he saw in indirect terms: "We've got bigger problems. Look, I'm not a doctor, I'm telling you it don't look good." His brief interview after being released from the mandatory trip to the infield care center was likely the first indication to most observers that the situation was serious. Only shortly after the tenth anniversary when asked about it, did Schrader finally say, "Here's the deal. When I went up to the car ... I knew. I knew he was dead, yeah. ... I didn't want to be the one who said 'Dale is dead.'"

This is undoubtedly one of the toughest announcements that I've ever personally had to make, but after the accident in turn four at the end of the Daytona 500, we've lost Dale Earnhardt.

— Mike Helton, announcing the confirmation of Earnhardt's death to the media

Race officials threw the checkered flag and the yellow simultaneously as the front-runners crossed the finish line, aware only that a crash had occurred behind the finishers but not sure of the seriousness. Waltrip won the race, with Earnhardt Jr. finishing second behind him. Rusty Wallace finished third (after taking damage in the lap 173 crash), Ricky Rudd finished fourth, polesitter Bill Elliott finished fifth, Wallace's brother Mike finished sixth, Marlin finished seventh, Bobby Hamilton finished eighth, Jeremy Mayfield finished ninth, and outside polesitter Stacy Compton finished 10th. Joe Nemechek finished 11th. Earnhardt and Schrader were credited finishing 12th and 13th despite not completing the final lap (only 11 cars – Waltrip and Earnhardt Jr. included – finished on the lead lap as a result of the long green flag runs and the lap 173 crash).

Per NASCAR rules, any driver involved in a crash and unable to drive back to the pits or who must be extricated from their car must report to the infield hospital. However, in severe cases, the driver may be sent directly to the emergency trauma room at a hospital near the circuit. Earnhardt was extricated from his car by Daytona's safety teams and was taken by ambulance to Halifax Medical Center which was two miles (3.2 km) from the Speedway. He was pronounced dead on arrival at 5:16 p.m. Eastern Standard Time (22:16 UTC). The official cause of Earnhardt's death was given by the Volusia County medical examiner's office as blunt force trauma to his head among other injuries due to the incident.

Less than two hours after the accident, NASCAR president Mike Helton announced Earnhardt's death. A later investigation revealed that Earnhardt's car struck the concrete retaining wall at a heading angle (angle of the vehicle measured from the wall face to the center-line of the car at point of impact) of between 55–59°, combined with a trajectory angle of 13.6° (path of vehicle approaching the wall) and an estimated speed between 157 and 161 miles per hour (253 and 259 km/h). Earnhardt experienced a crash impulse of approximately 80 milliseconds in duration. The result of the wall impact and the impact from Schrader's car combined to yield a change in velocity of approximately 42–44 miles per hour (68–71 km/h). The force exerted was equivalent to a vertical drop from a height of 61.8 feet (18.8 m). Later sled testing of an exemplar vehicle yielded g-forces ranging from −68 to −48 g, variation dependent on method of measurement.

== Aftermath ==
Earnhardt's death triggered widespread media attention. One newspaper called the day "Black Sunday".

Earnhardt's public funeral service was held on February 22, 2001, at the Calvary Church in Charlotte, North Carolina.

Days after the crash, Sterling Marlin received hate mail and death threats from fans who blamed him for Earnhardt's death. Dale Earnhardt Jr. absolved Marlin of responsibility and asked everyone who loved his father to stop assigning blame for his death. On February 20, Marlin publicly announced his perspective:

I definitely didn't do anything intentional. We were just racing our guts out for the last lap of the Daytona 500. Everybody was going for it. Dale's car got caught in the middle [three-wide with Ken Schrader]. I was as low as I could go. Whether Rusty Wallace got him loose and down into me, I don't know. You have to talk to Rusty Wallace. I watched the tape one time and that is all I want to see it.

In the week following the accident, Bill Simpson, whose company Simpson Performance Products made the seatbelt Earnhardt wore during the race, reported that he had also received death threats from angry fans. When asked about this, Darrell Waltrip stated that "NASCAR is an emotion sport and that all the fans love their drivers, so when something like this happens, the connection to these racers makes you want to blame somebody and that somebody had to be involved and unfortunately, the blame was placed in the wrong place here".

Brad Keselowski later compared Earnhardt's death to that of Brazilian Formula One 3-time world champion Ayrton Senna. Keselowski, who was 10 years old when Senna died in a crash on Lap 7 of the 1994 San Marino Grand Prix at the Autodromo Enzo e Dino Ferrari in Imola, Italy, said, "For me personally it (Senna's death) reminded me a lot of when Dale Earnhardt died in the sense of the kind of general mood and atmosphere within my own family's household. My dad and brother used to wake up early and watch the Formula One races and I was only nine or 10 years old but I can remember my dad was a big Senna fan, and I can remember that he was never really a loud cheerleader type but I can remember him being more so of that than anything else I have ever seen, which was always unique to me. I just remember the somber tone in the household."

During the 2021 Daytona 500, fans and crew members at Daytona International Speedway paid tribute to Earnhardt on Lap 3, the 20th anniversary of his death. They stood and saluted him by holding up three fingers.

== Replacing Earnhardt ==
Team owner Richard Childress made a public pledge that a black car with a GM Goodwrench sponsorship would no longer use the number 3, honoring the color scheme and sponsor that Earnhardt had driven with since 1988. Given the No. 3 team's 12th-place finish in the race, 2000 season status as second in owner points, and presence on the Winner's Circle bonus program, Childress requested (and NASCAR approved) that the team be renumbered to 29, which was the first number available in order without a 3 in it (13 and 23 were open at that time). Kevin Harvick was tapped to drive the 29, causing him to do double duty in the NASCAR Busch Series and Cup Series for the rest of 2001. The renumbered team retained the same sponsor, although the car was adorned with an inverted color scheme—a white body with black numerals and a black stripe on the bottom—for races at Rockingham and Las Vegas. The team kept all bonuses earned as the No. 3 team in 2000 and the Daytona 500. For the race at Atlanta, a new GM Goodwrench Service Plus paint-scheme was introduced, along with angled red stripes and a thin blue pinstripe resembling the AC Delco-sponsored Chevrolets driven in the Busch Series. From 2002 to 2006, when the GM Goodwrench Service Plus sponsorship came to an end, the No. 29 car was painted in black and silver, bearing a resemblance to the No. 3. From 2001 - 2013, a small No. 3 decal was placed alongside the No. 29 in Earnhardt's memory and the team's legacy. On December 11, 2013, RCR announced that the No. 3 car would return to the Cup Series for Childress' grandson, Austin Dillon.

== Cause of death controversy ==
At a news conference five days after the crash, NASCAR officials announced that the left lap belt on Earnhardt's seat belt harness had broken. Dr. Steve Bohannon, NASCAR's medical expert, said he thought the faulty belt had allowed Earnhardt's chin to strike the steering wheel, causing the fatal basilar skull fracture. This led to speculation that Earnhardt would have survived if his seat belt had not broken.

The first paramedics to respond to the crash scene maintained that the seat belts had been loose, but the lap belt was not broken or cut when the belts were unbuckled to cut Earnhardt from the car. However, NASCAR's investigation concluded that each of the EMTs who attended to Earnhardt after the crash reported that the buckle position of Earnhardt's harness was off-center by four to eight inches (100 to 200 mm), which would have been impossible had the lap belt not broken.

At the time of the accident, Simpson Performance Products manufactured the seat belts used in nearly every NASCAR competitor's machine. Bill Simpson, the company's founder, maintained that the belt had failed because it had been installed in an unapproved fashion in order to increase Earnhardt's comfort, an allegation that had been supported by some who were familiar with the situation. Ed Hinton, a sportswriter for the Orlando Sentinel, attempted to acquire Earnhardt's autopsy records and photos for study, as autopsy records were normally public documents in Florida. However, Earnhardt's widow Teresa Earnhardt petitioned a judge to seal the records. After a short court battle, it was mutually agreed to appoint Dr. Barry Myers, an expert on crash injuries at Duke University, to independently study Earnhardt's death. On April 10, 2001, Myers published his report rejecting NASCAR's explanation, finding that Earnhardt's death was the result of his inadequately restrained head and neck snapping forward, independent of the broken seat belt (rendering the question of improper installation moot).

Philip Villanueva, a University of Miami neurosurgeon who had previously analyzed the crash for the Sentinel before the autopsy records were available, said he had reached the same conclusion but had wanted to examine the autopsy photos to be certain. Dr. Steve Olvey, who had been the medical director of CART for 22 years (and who presided over the 1999 Marlboro 500 where Greg Moore was killed), and Wayne State University crash expert John Melvin also agreed with Myers' report. Bill Simpson said that the report was "The best news I've heard in seven weeks. I've been living in daily hell."

On the same day as Myers' report was made public, NASCAR announced its own investigation, after having remained silent for six weeks since the crash. The official NASCAR report, which had cost over a million dollars and was published on August 21, 2001, concluded that Earnhardt's death was the result of a combination of factors, which included the last-second collision with Schrader's car, the speed and angle of impact, and the separation of the seat belt as being contributing factors. It was also noted that investigators could not determine whether a head and neck support (HANS) device would have saved Earnhardt's life, and that airline-style black boxes would be mandated for all vehicles in order to better understand the forces at work in a crash such as Earnhardt's.

The Simpson company attorneys asked NASCAR to unequivocally assert the following in regards to the broken lap belt found in Earnhardt's car:

- The belts were of high quality in workmanship and there were no design or manufacturing defects.
- The belts met the NASCAR rule book requirements.
- The belts, as installed, did not conform to manufacturer installation requirements.
- The separation of the left lap belt was not a result of design or manufacturing defect, but caused by improper installation.
- The belt separation was not the cause of Earnhardt's death.

NASCAR did not publicly issue a statement adopting these assertions. In 2002, Simpson filed a defamation lawsuit against NASCAR related to the report’s conclusions.

In July 2001, Bill Simpson left Simpson Performance Products, citing the stress as "too much". A year after leaving his own company under controversy, Simpson returned to the motorsports safety industry after his one-year non-compete clause expired, starting IMPACT! Racing Products.

== Safety improvements ==
After the accident, there were several safety improvements made in the sport of stock car racing.

In response to the speculation about the broken lap belt in Earnhardt's car, many teams migrated from traditional five to six-point safety harnesses.

Following the investigation into Earnhardt's death, results of which were released on August 21, 2001, NASCAR did not make any immediate changes regarding use of the HANS device. NASCAR president Mike Helton stated, "We are still not going to react for the sake of reacting." However, NASCAR did wish to "encourage their use". Most drivers had already begun to act voluntarily to wear the devices. Two days before the report was released, 41 out of 43 drivers were wearing them at the Pepsi 400 by Meijer at Michigan International Speedway.

NASCAR mandated use of the HANS or Hutchens device in its top three series on October 17, 2001, with the Hutchens device being phased out in 2005, leaving only the HANS device.

In addition to head and neck restraints, NASCAR began requiring the use of SAFER barriers at race tracks in which its top touring series compete.

Soon after Earnhardt's death, NASCAR began developing the Car of Tomorrow (CoT), which was used in competition in the NASCAR Cup Series until it was replaced by the so-called "Gen 6" car for the 2013 season. The design of the CoT incorporated the result of research conducted in the aftermath of Earnhardt's death. All of the safety improvements from the CoT remain in the Gen 6 design (which have been credited as having saved Ryan Newman's life after he suffered a last-lap crash during the 2020 Daytona 500).

== Autopsy pictures ==
On February 19, 2001, the Volusia County Medical Examiner performed an autopsy for Earnhardt. The unusual act of notifying NASCAR and Teresa Earnhardt was made prior to releasing the records sought by members of the public and media. Three days later, Teresa Earnhardt filed a legal brief in the Circuit Court of the Seventh Judicial Circuit, in and for Volusia County, Florida (Case No. 2001-30373-CICI Div. 32).

On February 28, March 13, and March 16, 2001, the Orlando Sentinel; Michael Uribe, founder of WebsiteCity.com; and Campus Communications, Inc., publisher of the University of Florida's student newspaper The Independent Florida Alligator filed motions to intervene into the Earnhardt v. Volusia litigation in order to uphold their rights to inspect and copy public records held by the Volusia County Medical Examiner to include the photographs and videotape of Dale Earnhardt's autopsy examination.

From June 12 to June 13, 2001, a trial was then conducted before Judge Joseph Will. Will eventually ruled against Uribe and CCI's original public records requests and constitutional arguments to inspect and copy the medical examiner files pertaining to Earnhardt, to include autopsy photographs. Judge Will's ruling set forth in motion an extensive legal battle later fought in the appellate courts by both Uribe and CCI seeking to deem the denial of their public records request unconstitutional under Florida State and Federal laws. Then on December 1, 2003, the United States Supreme Court declined to hear Uribe and CCI's appeal.

== See also ==
- Blink of an Eye (film) – 2019 film
- List of driver deaths in motorsport
- List of NASCAR fatalities
