= Restrictor plate =

Device installed at the intake of an engine to limit its power

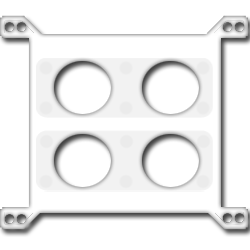
Artist rendering of a NASCAR restrictor plate

A restrictor plate or air restrictor is a device installed at the intake of an engine to limit its power. This kind of system is occasionally used in road vehicles (e.g., motorcycles) for insurance purposes, but mainly in automobile racing, to limit top speed to provide equal level of competition, and to lower costs; insurance purposes have also factored in for motorsports.

== Racing series ==
A few top classes like Formula One limit only the displacement and air intake mouth dimension. However, in 2006 air restrictors (as well as rev limiters) were used by Scuderia Toro Rosso to facilitate the transition to a new engine formula.

Many other racing series use additional air restrictors.

- Formula 3, 2000cc, 215 hp
- Formula SAE, 710cc, 20 mm restrictor.
- Deutsche Tourenwagen Masters, 4000cc, 470 hp
- FIA GT Championship (now FIA GT1 World Championship) and other series using FIA GT regulations
- Le Mans Prototypes used in American Le Mans Series and Le Mans Series have restrictors based on precalculated tables depending on the type and size of the engine and fuel
  - The ALMS in the 2010 season combines both LMP1 and LMP2 into a single LMP class on all races except 12 Hours of Sebring and Petit Le Mans; LMP1-categorized cars use a 5% smaller air restrictor compared to LMP2- categorized cars to balance performance in the races

== Rallying ==
After Group B cars were outlawed from rallying because they were too powerful (rumored to have had 600 hp), too fast and too dangerous, the FISA decided that rally cars should have no more than 300 hp (220 kW). For a while, no special restrictions were needed for that (e.g. the Group A Lancia Delta HF 4WD had about 250 hp in 1987). But with development in the 1990s, Group A cars were rumored to have reached 405 hp or more. So the FIA mandated restrictors for supercharged and turbocharged engines in all categories (World Rally Car, Group A and Group N).

This means that the rally versions of cars like the Mitsubishi Lancer Evolution may have less power than their road-going counterparts (the "280" hp Evo VII was believed to have more than 300 hp, and in some markets the FQ-320, FQ-340, FQ-360, FQ-400 versions were sold, with the number representing the total horsepower). The restrictors also make the torque and power curves of the rally car's engine unusual compared to most other cars. The engine produces peak torque and almost maximum power at a relatively low RPM, and from there to the rev limiter, the torque drops and the power does not increase much.

In 1995, Toyota Team Europe was found using an illegal device to bypass the restrictor (allowing an estimated extra 50 hp). Due to this, the team lost their results in that year's WRC season and was banned from rallying for the subsequent year.

== NASCAR ==
The NASCAR Cup Series and O'Reilly Auto Parts Series have mandated the use of restrictor plates at Daytona International Speedway and Talladega Superspeedway since 1988, and until the 2019 Daytona 500 for Cup Series only. The plates were put into use in 1988 as a result of a wreck in the 1987 Winston 500 at Talladega that involved the car of Bobby Allison crashing into the frontstretch catch fence at a high enough speed to destroy almost 100 feet (30 m) of the fence and put the race under a red flag condition for two hours. The following race at Talladega that year would be run with a smaller carburetor, however, NASCAR mandated the use of the restrictor plate at the end of the season.

The restrictions are in the interest of driver and fan safety because speeds higher than the 190 mph (310 km/h) range used for Daytona and Talladega risk cars turning over through sheer aerodynamic forces alone. The severity of crashes at higher speeds is also much greater, shown by telemetry readings of wrecks such as Elliott Sadler at Pocono Raceway and Michael McDowell at Texas Motor Speedway that were far higher than registered on restrictor plate tracks. Drivers such as Rusty Wallace have cited data showing that the roof flaps used on the cars cannot keep them on the ground above 204 mph (328 km/h).

The drawback to the use of the restrictor plates has been the increased size of packs of cars caused by the decreased power coupled with the drag the vehicles naturally produce. At Daytona and Talladega, most races are marred by at least one wreck, usually referred to as "the Big One", as cars rarely become separated. Talladega has been considered the more likely track for these instances to occur as the track is incredibly wide, enough to have three to four distinct lines of cars running side by side. With the new pavement at Daytona, three-wide racing became far easier, and multi-car wrecks became more common. The 2011 Daytona 500 saw a record number of cautions including an early 17-car pile-up. These wrecks tend to be singled out for criticism despite multicar crashes at other tracks and the generally greater severity of impact on non-restricted tracks. In addition, the packs were far smaller in 1988 through 1990 until more teams mastered the nuances of this kind of racing and improved their cars (and drivers) accordingly.

The 2011 Sprint Cup season was the last complete Cup season with carbureted engines; at the end of the 2011 season, NASCAR announced that it would change to an electronic fuel injection system for the 2012 racing season. The injection system used by NASCAR is a different system from that used in IndyCar Racing and other motorsports series; the EFI system that NASCAR put into use was compatible with the old restrictor plates, allowing NASCAR to continue to use them to keep the speeds lower at the superspeedways and save costs for race teams. The restrictor plates were bolted beneath a throttle body that sits in the same place as the former carburetors.

The last race with the original restrictor plates was the 2019 Daytona 500; after that race, the cars moved to a variable-sized tapered spacer already used at all other tracks, with the exception that the spacer would have smaller holes than the ones used at the smaller tracks, to ensure speeds stay under 200 mph (320 km/h). The shape of the spacer helps a car funnel more air smoothly into the manifold, increasing fuel performance, while ensuring airflow is still restricted. With that change, NASCAR also mandated the use of larger rear spoilers, larger front splitters, and specially-placed front end aero ducts. The combination of those features increased drag on the cars, counteracting the increased horsepower, keeping the cars close to the speeds they were running prior to the switch to the tapered spacer. While the racing quality noticeably improved, and passing was made easier with larger horsepower and bigger runs, speeds also noticeably increased past 200 mph (320 km/h), and even into 205 mph (330 km/h) ranges.

Starting in 2022, restrictor plate rules were used for Atlanta Motor Speedway because of concerns over speed after the circuit was repaved and reconfigured to 28 degree banking.

=== Reason for restrictor plates ===
NASCAR used restrictor plates first in 1970 as part of a phased transition from the seven-litre (430-cubic-inch) era to the six-litre (370-cubic-inch) era engine that would be in effect at the end of the 1973 season. Following testing and input from drivers such as David Pearson, Bobby Isaac, and Bobby Allison, NASCAR mandated the use of a restrictor plate for the big block seven-litre engines. Small block engines, in the 358 cubic inch range (which is still used today in NASCAR), were exempt from the plates; the first car to race with a small block engine was Dick Brooks at the 1971 Daytona 500, where he ran a 1969 Dodge Charger Daytona with a five-litre engine (to be exact, 305 CID). The transition period lasted until 1974, when the current 358 cubic inch (5870cc) limit was imposed. As the early 1970s use of restrictor plates was considered a transitional process, and as not every car used restrictor plates, this is not what most fans call "restrictor plate racing". This is similar to the 2006 Formula One season, where teams using V10 engines were run with air restrictors and rev limiters while teams running V8 engines were not.

The second use came following the crash of Bobby Allison at the 1987 Winston 500 at Talladega Superspeedway. Allison's Buick LeSabre blew a tire going into the tri-oval at 200 mph (320 km/h), spun around and became airborne, flying tail-first into the catch fencing. While the car did not enter the grandstands it tore down nearly 100 feet of fencing and flying debris injured several spectators. After a summer where the two subsequent superspeedway races were run with smaller carburetors (390 cubic feet per minute (cfm) instead of 830 cfm) proved to be inadequate to sufficiently slow the cars, NASCAR imposed restrictor plates again, this time at the two fastest circuits, both superspeedways: Daytona for all NASCAR-sanctioned races and Talladega for Cup races. The Automobile Racing Club of America also enforced restrictor plates at their events at the two tracks. In 1992, when the Busch Grand National series began racing at Talladega, the plates were implemented, in keeping with their use at Daytona.

NASCAR's concerns with speeds because of power-to-weight ratios result in restrictor plates at other tracks. The Goody's Dash Series (known now as the ISCARS series with its new ownership) used restrictor plates at Bristol during at least the last years of the series' existence when the cars were using six-cylinder engines (compared to the traditional four cylinder engines), in addition to their Daytona races.

However, restrictor plates were not initially used for Craftsman Truck Series trucks. Rather, aerodynamic air intake reduction through the use of a 390 cfm carburetor, and eventually a tapered carburetor spacer were implemented for those races. Combined with the aerodynamic disadvantage of the trucks, this allowed NASCAR to avoid the use of such equipment for the trucks until 2008. In 2008, the Nationwide Series (now known as the O'Reilly Auto Parts Series) and Truck Series began implementation of tapered spacers in the engines to restrict power compared to Sprint Cup cars at all 35 (NNS) and 25 (NCTS) races. Both these NASCAR series now use a restrictor plate and tapered spacer at the two tracks.

The third use came in 2000. Following fatal crashes of Adam Petty and Kenny Irwin Jr. at the New Hampshire International Speedway during the May Busch Series and July Winston Cup Series races, respectively, NASCAR adopted a one-inch (2.54 cm) restrictor plate to slow the cars headed towards the tight turns as part of a series of reforms to alleviate stuck throttle problems which were alleged to have caused both fatal crashes. For the Winston Cup race, it was used just once at the 2000 Dura Lube 300. Jeff Burton led all 300 laps in the ensuing race, despite a 23-car two-abreast battle in the first ten laps, a dramatic charge past 22 cars in 100 laps by John Andretti (who finished seventh), and two charges by Bobby Labonte in the final 50 laps where he took the lead but Burton beat him back to the stripe. The use of restrictor plates, intended as an emergency measure pending a more permanent replacement in any event, was discontinued at New Hampshire for the following race for Cup only. However, the Modifieds still use a restrictor plate because the speeds are too great for that class of racecar without them. The track has since been changed with SAFER Barriers to improve racing safety. Restrictor plates remain a permanent fixture on the Modifieds and the racing has often broken 20 official lead changes for 100–125 laps of competition.

Rusty Wallace tested a car at Talladega Superspeedway without a restrictor plate in 2004, reaching a top speed of 240 mph (390 km/h) in the backstretch and a one-lap average of 221 mph (356 km/h). While admitting excitement at the achievement, Wallace also conceded, "There's no way we could be out there racing at those speeds... it would be insane to think we could have a pack of cars out there doing that."

In 2016, following a series of uncompetitive races at Indianapolis Motor Speedway, NASCAR began a series of tests for the Xfinity Series (now known as the O'Reilly Auto Parts Series) using a smaller restrictor plate than used at Daytona and Talladega and aerodynamic aids. After the tests were successful, the rules package was imposed for the 2017 race at Indianapolis. For 2018, the package was used at Indianapolis, Michigan, and Pocono for the O'Reilly Auto Parts Series and in the All-Star Race in the Cup Series.

=== The competitive quality of restrictor plate racing ===
A frequent criticism of restrictor plates is the enormous size of packs in races, with "Big One" wrecks as noted above singled out for condemnation despite the greater violence of smaller-scale crashes on unrestricted tracks. In restrictor plate racing, the packs have brought about an often-enormous increase in positional passing; at Talladega Superspeedway, the Sprint Cup cars have surpassed 40 official lead changes sixteen times from 1988 onward, including both 2010 Sprint Cup races at Talladega, which had 87 official lead changes in the regulation 188 laps. (The 2010 Aaron's 499 had 88 lead changes, but the 88th – the race-winning pass by Kevin Harvick – was on the last lap of the third attempt at a green–white–checkered finish). Daytona International Speedway has generally been less competitive because the age of the asphalt (the track was repaved in 1978 and again in 2010) has reduced grip for the cars and thus handling has impeded passing ability to a significant extent. The 2000 New Hampshire race was criticized because Jeff Burton led wire to wire; the plates were singled out as impeding ability to pass, a criticism contradicted by the use of restrictor plates in a Busch North support race the day before, where the lead changed seven times in 100 laps, and by the highly competitive nature of restrictor plated Modified races; as noted above, the 300 also saw a 23-car battle for third in the first ten laps and a burst by 22 cars from John Andretti.

The criticism stems from reduction in throttle response brought by the restriction. The reduction in throttle response, however, has never been shown to have impeded ability to pass; the criticism was shot down in the first "modern" plate race, the 1988 Daytona 500, as the lead changed 25 times officially and saw several bursts where the lead changed several times a lap and also several bursts of sustained side-by-side racing, notably in the final 50 laps between Bobby Allison, Darrell Waltrip, Neil Bonnett, and Buddy Baker.

Said Waltrip before the race, "I feel, as a driver, now I can do more than I could before [the plates]. Now, instead of a car just blasting by me with a burst of speed and a lot of horsepower, he's got to think his way, he got to drive his way around me."

In the transitional years (1971–76) where the seven-litre engines (430 cubic inches) had restrictor plates, Daytona and Talladega broke 40 official lead changes six times, while Michigan International Speedway broke 35 official lead changes in both of its 1971 races.
