= R3 device =

Race driver head protection gear

The R3 Head and neck restraint device is a device for protecting race car drivers in the event of an accident by controlling head movement, reducing head and neck injuries due to whiplash. It consists of a carbon fiber cross which is worn like a vest. The cross goes against the driver's back and Kevlar straps hold it on. These are clipped at the front. The top of the cross has straps which attach with clips to the helmet.

The R3 is certified to meet the SFI 38.1 safety standard. It has yet to pass tests from FIA.
