= 2000 Dura Lube 300 =

Race 26 of 2000 NASCAR Winston Cup series

Race details
- Race 26 of 34 in the 2000 NASCAR Winston Cup Series
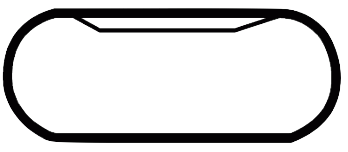
- Layout of New Hampshire Motor Speedway
- Date: September 17, 2000
- Official name: 2000 Dura Lube 300 Sponsored by Kmart
- Location: New Hampshire International Speedway, Loudon, New Hampshire
- Course: Permanent racing facility
- Course length: 1.06 miles (1.703 km)
- Distance: 300 laps, 317.4 mi (510.8 km)
- Average speed: 102.003 mph (164.158 km/h)

Pole position
Driver	Bobby Labonte	Joe Gibbs Racing

Most laps led
Driver	Jeff Burton	Roush Racing
- Laps: 300

Winner
No. 99	Jeff Burton	Roush Racing

Television in the United States
- Network: TNN

The 2000 Dura Lube 300 was a NASCAR Winston Cup Series race that was held on September 17, 2000, at New Hampshire International Speedway in Loudon, New Hampshire. The race was the twenty-sixth of the 2000 NASCAR Winston Cup Series season. The pole position was won by Bobby Labonte of Joe Gibbs Racing, while Roush Racing's Jeff Burton won after leading all 300 laps. As of 2026, this was the last time that a driver led every single lap in a Cup Series race.

== Background ==
New Hampshire Motor Speedway is one of ten intermediate tracks to hold NASCAR races. The standard track at New Hampshire Motor Speedway is a four-turn oval track, 1.06 mi (1.71 km) long. Its banking in the turns varies from two to seven degrees, while the front stretch, the finish line, and the back stretch are all banked at one degree.

After the deaths of Adam Petty and Kenny Irwin Jr. in practice session accidents at the track during the previous summer, NASCAR mandated the use of restrictor plates for the event. The use marked the first time the plate was used at a track shorter than 2.5 mi (4.0 km), as Daytona International Speedway and Talladega Superspeedway had been the only tracks to use it. Because of this, Burton and Steve Park (who finished 34th at Loudon) tested at the Milwaukee Mile with restrictor plates, which had a similar layout to New Hampshire. As a result of the installation of the restrictor plate, speeds at the track dropped by approximately 10 mph (16 km/h).

Another effect of Petty and Irwin's deaths is the possibility of a drivers' strike, as drivers had requested the addition of "soft walls". Eventually, the drivers stated that they would run the Dura Lube 300, although they would not be pleased with running. A variation of soft walls, the SAFER barriers, was eventually adopted in 2002, but were not added to New Hampshire until a year later.

== Race ==
Pole-sitter Bobby Labonte lost the lead on the first lap while entering turn 1 to Jeff Burton. On lap 96, Scott Pruett crashed in turn 4, and the caution flag was flown for three laps until lap 99. The green flag flew for 101 laps until a debris caution was flown. On lap 216, Jeremy Mayfield, Mike Bliss, Ward Burton, Wally Dallenbach Jr., Dave Blaney, Rick Mast and Kevin Lepage crashed in turn 2. The green was flown again on lap 220, and the race was run under green until lap 247, in which Bill Elliott crashed on the frontstretch. Another caution was thrown for Chad Little and Steve Park's accident in turn 4 on lap 279. On lap 290, Ward Burton, Rick Mast, Jerry Nadeau, Jeff Gordon and Dale Earnhardt Jr. were involved in a crash in turn 2. The green waved for four laps from lap 294 to 297, in which the final caution was waved for Sterling Marlin's spin in turn 2. The race ended under caution, and Jeff Burton claimed his fourteenth career victory and third of the season, after leading all 300 laps. Bobby Labonte finished second, followed by Ricky Rudd, Dale Jarrett and Rusty Wallace; Jeff Gordon, John Andretti, Mark Martin, Joe Nemechek and Ken Schrader closed out the top ten.

His feat of leading every lap was the third to occur in Cup history, after Cale Yarborough accomplished it at Bristol in 1973 and at Nashville Fairgrounds in 1978. It was also the third in NASCAR history to occur at a superspeedway, with Fireball Roberts at Marchbanks Speedway in 1961, along with Yarborough's Nashville win in 1978. Burton's accomplishment was the last such instance in the Cup Series; the closest since is Martin Truex Jr.'s 2016 Coca-Cola 600 victory, in which he led 392 of 400 laps.

== Race results ==
Pos	Start	No.	Driver	Team	Manufacturer	Laps	Laps led	Status
1	2	99	Jeff Burton	Roush Racing	Ford	300	300	Running
2	1	18	Bobby Labonte	Joe Gibbs Racing	Pontiac	300	0	Running
3	19	28	Ricky Rudd	Robert Yates Racing	Ford	300	0	Running
4	4	88	Dale Jarrett	Robert Yates Racing	Ford	300	0	Running
5	5	2	Rusty Wallace	Penske–Kranefuss Racing	Ford	300	0	Running
6	18	24	Jeff Gordon	Hendrick Motorsports	Chevrolet	300	0	Running
7	31	43	John Andretti	Petty Enterprises	Pontiac	300	0	Running
8	15	6	Mark Martin	Roush Racing	Ford	300	0	Running
9	30	33	Joe Nemechek	Andy Petree Racing	Chevrolet	300	0	Running
10	9	36	Ken Schrader	MB2 Motorsports	Pontiac	300	0	Running
11	27	10	Johnny Benson Jr.	MB2 Motorsports	Pontiac	300	0	Running
12	37	3	Dale Earnhardt	Richard Childress Racing	Chevrolet	299	0	Running
13	7	21	Elliott Sadler	Wood Brothers Racing	Ford	299	0	Running
14	11	01	Ted Musgrave	Team SABCO	Chevrolet	299	0	Running
15	29	26	Jimmy Spencer	Haas-Carter Motorsports	Ford	298	0	Running
16	24	9	Stacy Compton	Melling Racing	Ford	298	0	Running
17	38	17	Matt Kenseth	Roush Racing	Ford	298	0	Running
18	39	77	Robert Pressley	Jasper Motorsports	Ford	298	0	Running
19	10	27	Mike Bliss	Eel River Racing	Pontiac	298	0	Running
20	13	7	Michael Waltrip	Ultra Motorsports	Chevrolet	298	0	Running
21	8	25	Jerry Nadeau	Hendrick Motorsports	Chevrolet	298	0	Running
22	3	40	Sterling Marlin	Team SABCO	Chevrolet	298	0	Running
23	16	20	Tony Stewart	Joe Gibbs Racing	Pontiac	297	0	Running
24	23	31	Mike Skinner	Richard Childress Racing	Chevrolet	297	0	Running
25	34	5	Terry Labonte	Hendrick Motorsports	Chevrolet	297	0	Running
26	40	93	Dave Blaney	Bill Davis Racing	Pontiac	297	0	Running
27	42	60	Geoff Bodine	Joe Bessey Motorsports	Chevrolet	297	0	Running
28	43	90	Hut Stricklin	Donlavey Racing	Ford	297	0	Running
29	36	66	Darrell Waltrip	Haas-Carter Motorsports	Ford	293	0	Running
30	28	22	Ward Burton	Bill Davis Racing	Pontiac	291	0	Crash
31	20	8	Dale Earnhardt Jr.	Dale Earnhardt, Inc.	Chevrolet	288	0	Crash
32	26	14	Rick Mast	A. J. Foyt Enterprises	Pontiac	287	0	Crash
33	35	97	Chad Little	Roush Racing	Ford	275	0	Crash
34	6	1	Steve Park	Dale Earnhardt, Inc.	Chevrolet	275	0	Crash
35	14	4	Bobby Hamilton	Morgan–McClure Motorsports	Chevrolet	260	0	Running
36	12	50	Ricky Craven	Midwest Transit Racing	Chevrolet	249	0	Transmission
37	21	94	Bill Elliott	Bill Elliott Racing	Ford	244	0	Crash
38	32	16	Kevin Lepage	Roush Racing	Ford	234	0	Crash
39	41	75	Wally Dallenbach Jr.	Galaxy Motorsports	Ford	233	0	Crash
40	17	12	Jeremy Mayfield	Penske–Kranefuss Racing	Ford	212	0	Crash
41	33	32	Scott Pruett	PPI Motorsports	Ford	93	0	Crash
42	22	11	Brett Bodine	Brett Bodine Racing	Ford	60	0	Engine
43	25	55	Kenny Wallace	Andy Petree Racing	Chevrolet	39	0	Engine

=== Failed to qualify ===
- Steve Grissom (#44)
- Dave Marcis (#71)
- Robby Gordon (#13) (withdrawn)

== Standings ==
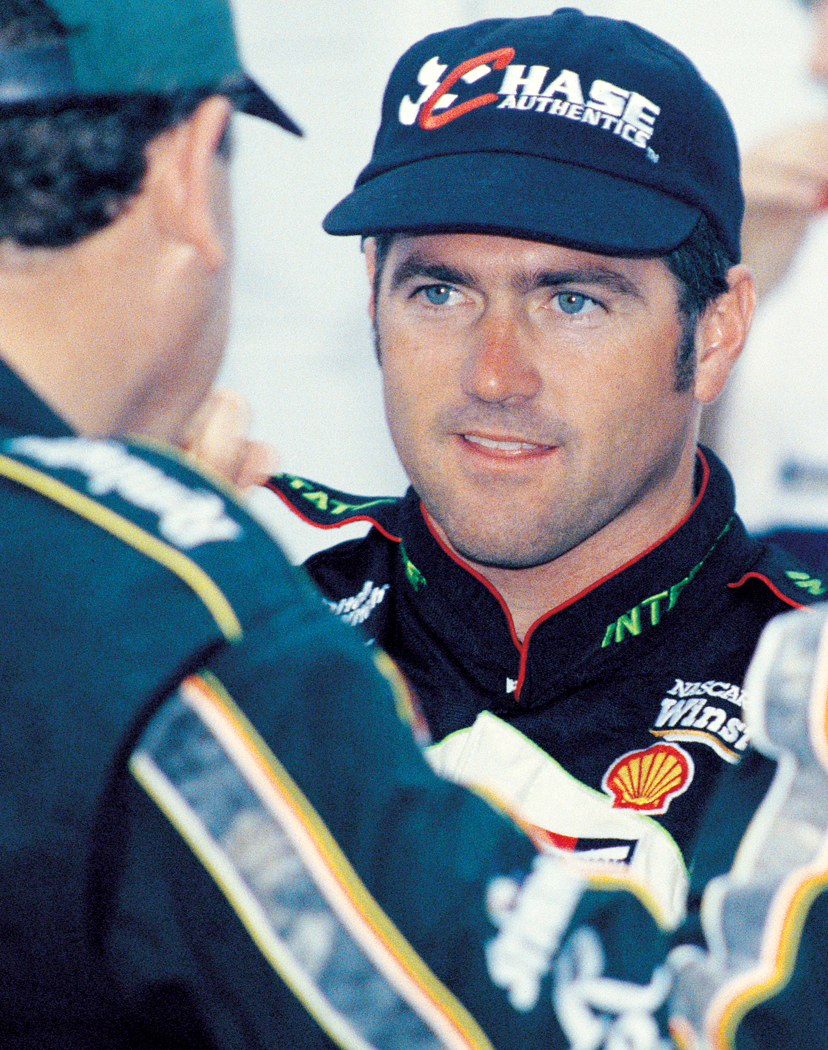
After finishing in second at the Dura Lube 300, Bobby Labonte retained his points lead.

Pos	Driver	Points
1	Bobby Labonte	3931
2	Jeff Burton	3763
3	Dale Jarrett	3757
4	Dale Earnhardt	3730
5	Ricky Rudd	3462
6	Rusty Wallace	3462
7	Tony Stewart	3447
8	Mark Martin	3429
9	Ward Burton	3354
10	Jeff Gordon	3220

Previous race: 2000 Chevrolet Monte Carlo 400	Winston Cup Series; 2000 season	Next race: 2000 MBNA.com 400
