= Hutchens device =

Safety device for race car drivers

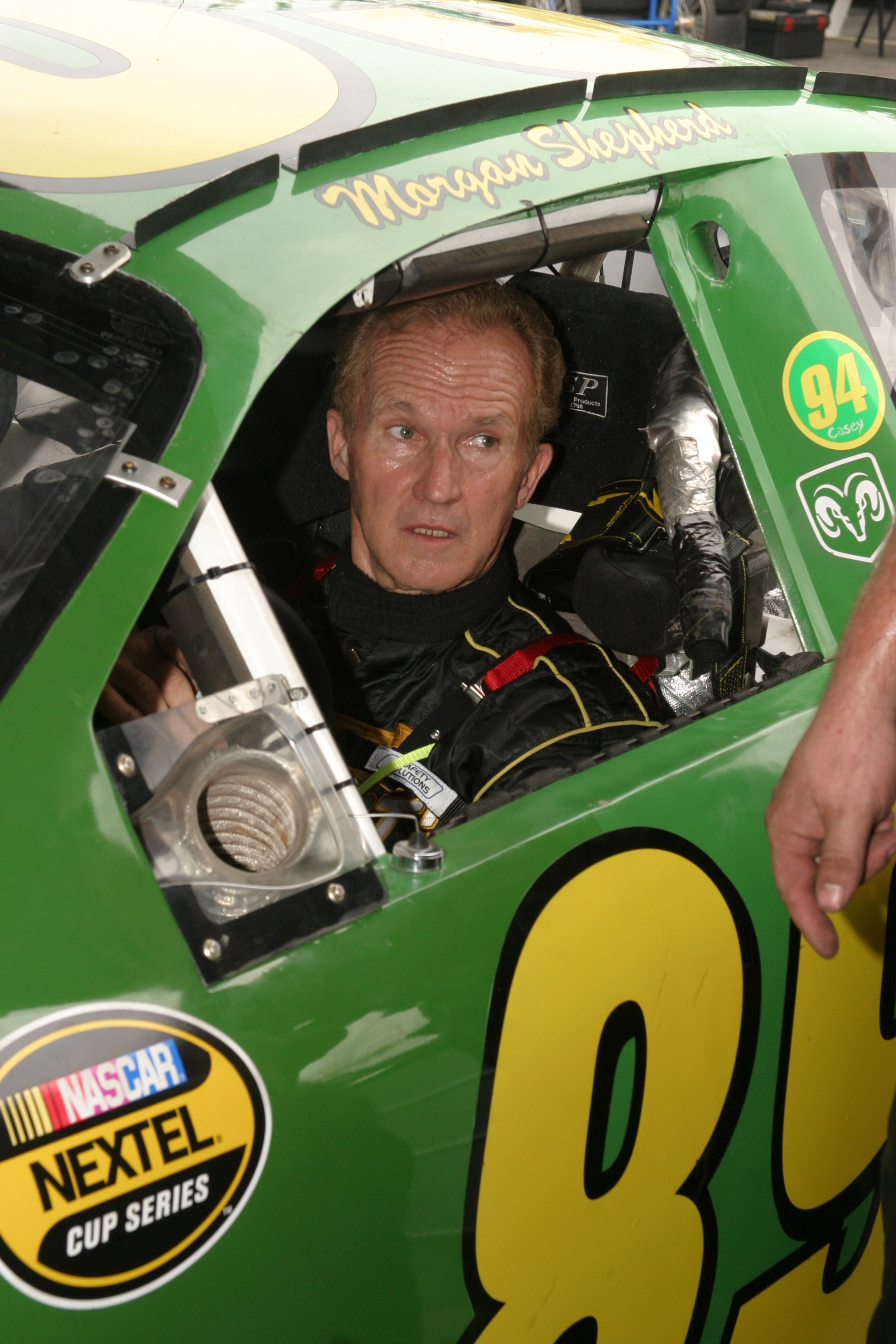
NASCAR driver Morgan Shepherd wearing a Hutchens device in 2004

A Hutchens device is used for protecting race car drivers in the event of an accident by controlling head movement, reducing head and neck injuries due to whiplash. It consists of a series of straps, attached to the helmet and connected across the chest and at the waist, depending on the lap belt for anchoring. The device was developed beginning in 2000.

From 2001 until 2004 NASCAR mandated that drivers use either a Hutchens device or the HANS device. NASCAR banned the use of the Hutchens device in January 2005, due to it failing SFI Foundation safety tests, and required all drivers to use the HANS device instead.

== Description ==
The Hutchens device was developed by engineer Trevor Ashline. It was named after Bobby Hutchens, who also helped develop the product. Hutchens was a driver on the NASCAR Whelen Modified Tour, and was a racing engineer and the general manager of Richard Childress Racing at the time of the device's creation. The Hutchens device consists of several straps which wrap around the driver's shoulders, chest and waist. Additional straps travel up the back and, like the HANS device, connect to anchors on the driver's helmet. Another set of straps travels down to the driver's lower body. In its original design, the Hutchens device was affixed to the racing harness (seat belt) in order to restrain the driver's head, connecting to the lap belt. A redesigned version used the driver's own body as an anchor, specifically the pelvis.

Both the HANS and Hutchens devices are designed to restrict "forward whipping of the head" due to the change in velocity during an impact, which can lead to a fatal basilar skull fracture. In a crash, the straps of the Hutchens device tighten as the driver's head begins to move forward, and use the driver's pelvic area as an anchor to prevent whipping of the head and neck.

When first introduced, many drivers gravitated to the Hutchens device over the HANS device, particularly those who had resisted using any device, due to greater comfort and range of movement versus the HANS. The Hutchens device was also more affordable than the HANS device, as the Hutchens was priced at less than $500 while the price for the HANS could run as high as $2,000. Because of its price point, the device was considered more practical for amateur racers.

== History ==
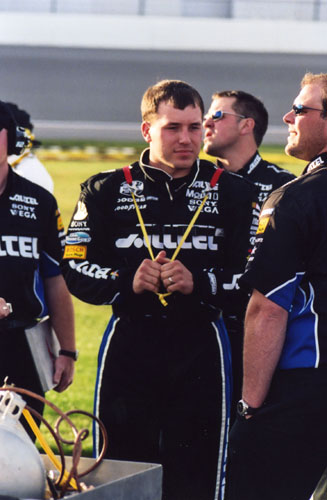
Ryan Newman wearing a Hutchens device in 2003. The device consists of a series of straps.

In 2000, Bobby Hutchens and Richard Childress along with two other individuals started Mattec Inc. That year, Trevor Ashline began developing the device.

Following the death of Dale Earnhardt in the Daytona 500 in February 2001, many NASCAR drivers began voluntarily wearing head-and-neck restraint devices such as the HANS device and the Hutchens device. One week after Earnhardt's death at the Dura Lube 400, drivers Mike Skinner, Kevin Harvick, Bobby Labonte, and Elliott Sadler utilized the Hutchens device during the race. Skinner and Harvick were drivers for Richard Childress Racing, the team Earnhardt drove for. Sadler and Labonte, meanwhile, requested the device from Hutchens and Ashline. The name "Hutchens device" was coined by a reporter from NASCAR.com at that time. At the Pepsi 400 in July, 41 of the 43 competitors used a restraint device, Tony Stewart and Jimmy Spencer being the only drivers not to use a device. During the race, Earnhardt's son Dale Earnhardt Jr. used the Hutchens device; it was the first time he had used a head-and-neck restraint during a race. In September 2001, Mattec Inc. was licensed to produce the Hutchens device. The device is covered by United States patent 6,499,149, issued December 31, 2002.US 6499149, Hutchens, Robert, "Head and neck restraint system", issued 2002-12-31 Prior to the EA Sports 500 at Talladega Superspeedway in October of that year, shortly after the death of Blaise Alexander in an ARCA race, NASCAR mandated the use of either the HANS or Hutchens device in its top three touring series (Winston Cup Series, Busch Series, Craftsman Truck Series). ARCA also mandated its drivers to use a restraint device beginning at Talladega. Tony Stewart was the only notable driver on the Winston Cup circuit who had yet to use either device on a regular basis. Stewart cited claustrophobia issues with the HANS device, and reliability issues with the Hutchens device.

In April 2002, Safety Solutions Inc. purchased the license to the device from Mattec. During the 2002 NASCAR season, doubts were raised about the effectiveness of the Hutchens device. In April of that year, Earnhardt Jr. crashed in a race at California Speedway while wearing the device, suffering a concussion and blurred vision. In June of that year, driver John Baker was killed in an accident in a NASCAR Southwest Series event, while wearing a Hutchens device and an open-face helmet. In September of that year, Sterling Marlin suffered chest injuries in a crash at Richmond, then a fractured vertebra at Kansas, both while wearing the Hutchens device. The injuries led to Marlin missing the final seven Cup Series races of the year, and required him to wear a neck brace while recovering. In October of that year, NASCAR safety consultant John Melvin stated that the HANS was a safer restraint than the Hutchens device, the former better preventing forward head movement during a crash.

By June 2004, the majority of NASCAR NEXTEL Cup Series drivers were wearing HANS devices instead of Hutchens devices. In January 2005 prior to the 2005 season, NASCAR banned use of the Hutchens device and mandated use of the HANS. The Hutchens device was said to have failed two of the three tests performed by NASCAR and the SFI Foundation, under new standards for head-and-neck restraints implemented for the 2005 season. By this time, only Tony Stewart, Ryan Newman, and Rusty Wallace were known to use the Hutchens device. Ashline would go on to develop the R3 and Hutchens II head-and-neck devices, and in 2007 created the Hutchens Hybrid device which was approved by NASCAR. In May 2011, Safety Solutions was purchased by Simpson Performance Products. Simpson would also purchase HANS Performance Products in 2012.
