= John Melvin (engineer) =

Biomechanics research engineer (1938–2014)

John William Melvin (May 15, 1938 – July 17, 2014) was a research engineer in the field of the biomechanics of automobile crashes and a safety consultant in the field of automotive racing safety.

== Early life and education ==
Melvin was born in Washington D.C. to Eleanor (Joness) Melvin and Eugene H. Melvin. He received his B.S. (1960), M.S. (1962) and Ph.D. (1964) degrees in Theoretical and Applied Mechanics from the University of Illinois.

== Career ==
Melvin worked as a research scientist at the University of Michigan Transportation Research Institute (UMTRI) from 1968 to 1985. He was an associate professor in the Mechanical Engineering and Applied Mechanics Department at the University of Michigan from 1978 to 1986. He was an Adjunct Associate Professor of Mechanical Engineering at Wayne State University from 1987 to 1998, and an adjunct professor of biomedical engineering at the same institution from 1998 until his death.

From 1985 to 1998 Melvin was a Senior Staff Research Engineer at the General Motors Research Laboratories. He retired from General Motors in 1998 and became an independent consultant for the automotive industry and for organizations such as the Indy Racing League, the FIA / Formula 1, and NASA. In 2001, he became a safety consultant for NASCAR, serving as the Technical Consultant to NASCAR for Race Car Safety.

John Melvin held four patents in the field of automotive safety:

- U.S. patent 3,876,979, "Data link arrangement with error checking and retransmission control".
- U.S. patent 5,282,646, "Multi-chamber air bag with displacement responsive valve".
- U.S. patent 6,139,111, "Four point seat-mounted restraint apparatus".
- U.S. patent 6,305,713, "Four point restraint apparatus".

== Honors and awards ==
Melvin was an elected fellow of AIMBE (2002), the SAE (2002), and the FIA Institute for Motorsports Safety (2004).

His work in transportation and motorsports safety was recognized by the US Department of Transportation with their Award for Safety Engineering Excellence and the SAE Louis Schwitzer Award for Innovation and Engineering Excellence in the Field of Race Car Design, both in 1998.

In 2016, the SAE Motorsports Council created the SAE International Award for Motorsport Safety Honoring John Melvin, which was endowed through funding from NASCAR.
