= 2000 Winston 500 =

30th race of the 2000 NASCAR Winston Cup Series

Race details
- Race 30 of 34 in the 2000 NASCAR Winston Cup Series
- The 2000 Winston 500 program cover, featuring Dale Earnhardt.
- Date: October 15, 2000
- Official name: 32nd Annual Winston 500 Presented By UPS
- Location: Lincoln, Alabama, Talladega Superspeedway
- Course: Permanent racing facility
- Course length: 2.66 miles (4.28 km)
- Distance: 188 laps, 500.08 mi (804.8 km)
- Average speed: 165.681 miles per hour (266.638 km/h)
- Attendance: 140,000

Pole position
Driver	Joe Nemechek	Andy Petree Racing
- Time: 50.326

Most laps led
Driver	Bill Elliott	Bill Elliott Racing
- Laps: 40

Winner
No. 3	Dale Earnhardt	Richard Childress Racing

Television in the United States
- Network: ESPN
- Announcers: Jerry Punch, Ned Jarrett, Benny Parsons

Radio in the United States
- Radio: Motor Racing Network

The 2000 Winston 500 Presented By UPS was the 30th stock car race of the 2000 NASCAR Winston Cup Series, the last of five No Bull 5 events in that year's season, and the 32nd iteration of the event. The race was held on Sunday, October 15, 2000, before an audience of 140,000 in Lincoln, Alabama at Talladega Superspeedway, a 2.66 miles (4.28 km) permanent triangle-shaped superspeedway. The race took the scheduled 188 laps to complete.

In what is considered by NASCAR as one of the most memorable finishes in NASCAR Winston Cup Series history, Richard Childress Racing's Dale Earnhardt managed to come back from the 18th position with five laps left in the race, making a late-race charge to gain the lead by the start of the final lap. Defending against Andy Petree Racing's Kenny Wallace, Earnhardt was able to defend the field to take his 76th and final career NASCAR Winston Cup Series victory, his second and final victory of the season, and a No Bull 5 victory, netting him a bonus of $1,000,000. To fill out the top three, the aforementioned Kenny Wallace and his teammate, Joe Nemechek finished second and third, respectively.

== Background ==
The layout of Talladega Superspeedway, the venue where the race was held.

Talladega Superspeedway, originally known as Alabama International Motor Superspeedway (AIMS), is a motorsports complex located north of Talladega, Alabama. It is located on the former Anniston Air Force Base in the small city of Lincoln. The track is a tri-oval and was constructed in the 1960s by the International Speedway Corporation, a business controlled by the France family. Talladega is most known for its steep banking and the unique location of the start/finish line that's located just past the exit to pit road. Talladega is the longest NASCAR oval, a 2.66-mile-long (4.28 km) tri-oval like the Daytona International Speedway, which also is a 2.5-mile-long (4.0 km) tri-oval.

=== Entry list ===
- (R) denotes rookie driver.
- (N) denotes driver eligible for the No Bull 5.

#	Driver	Team	Make
1	Steve Park (N)	Dale Earnhardt, Inc.	Chevrolet
01	Ted Musgrave	Team SABCO	Chevrolet
2	Rusty Wallace	Penske-Kranefuss Racing	Ford
3	Dale Earnhardt (N)	Richard Childress Racing	Chevrolet
4	Bobby Hamilton	Morgan–McClure Motorsports	Chevrolet
5	Terry Labonte	Hendrick Motorsports	Chevrolet
6	Mark Martin (N)	Roush Racing	Ford
7	Michael Waltrip	Mattei Motorsports	Chevrolet
8	Dale Earnhardt Jr. (R)	Dale Earnhardt, Inc.	Chevrolet
9	Stacy Compton (R)	Melling Racing	Ford
10	Johnny Benson Jr.	MB2 Motorsports	Pontiac
11	Brett Bodine	Brett Bodine Racing	Ford
12	Jeremy Mayfield	Penske-Kranefuss Racing	Ford
14	Rick Mast	A. J. Foyt Enterprises	Pontiac
16	Kevin Lepage	Roush Racing	Ford
17	Matt Kenseth (R)	Roush Racing	Ford
18	Bobby Labonte	Joe Gibbs Racing	Pontiac
20	Tony Stewart	Joe Gibbs Racing	Pontiac
21	Elliott Sadler	Wood Brothers Racing	Ford
22	Ward Burton	Bill Davis Racing	Pontiac
24	Jeff Gordon (N)	Hendrick Motorsports	Chevrolet
25	Jerry Nadeau	Hendrick Motorsports	Chevrolet
26	Jimmy Spencer	Haas-Carter Motorsports	Ford
27	Mike Bliss (R)	Eel River Racing	Pontiac
28	Ricky Rudd	Robert Yates Racing	Ford
31	Mike Skinner	Richard Childress Racing	Chevrolet
32	Scott Pruett (R)	PPI Motorsports	Ford
33	Joe Nemechek	Andy Petree Racing	Chevrolet
36	Ken Schrader	MB2 Motorsports	Pontiac
40	Sterling Marlin	Team SABCO	Chevrolet
43	John Andretti	Petty Enterprises	Pontiac
44	Steve Grissom	Petty Enterprises	Pontiac
50	Ricky Craven	Midwest Transit Racing	Chevrolet
55	Kenny Wallace	Andy Petree Racing	Chevrolet
60	Rich Bickle	Joe Bessey Racing	Chevrolet
66	Darrell Waltrip	Haas-Carter Motorsports	Ford
71	Dave Marcis	Marcis Auto Racing	Chevrolet
75	Wally Dallenbach Jr.	Galaxy Motorsports	Ford
77	Robert Pressley	Jasper Motorsports	Ford
88	Dale Jarrett	Robert Yates Racing	Ford
90	Hut Stricklin	Donlavey Racing	Ford
91	Blaise Alexander	LJ Racing	Chevrolet
93	Dave Blaney (R)	Bill Davis Racing	Pontiac
94	Bill Elliott	Bill Elliott Racing	Ford
97	Chad Little	Roush Racing	Ford
99	Jeff Burton (N)	Roush Racing	Ford
Official entry list

== Practice ==
=== First practice ===
The first practice session was held on Friday, October 13, at 12:00 PM EST. The session lasted for two hours. Dale Earnhardt, Inc.'s Steve Park set the fastest time in the session, with a lap of 50.105 and an average speed of 191.119 mph (307.576 km/h).

Pos.	#	Driver	Team	Make	Time	Speed
1	1	Steve Park (N)	Dale Earnhardt, Inc.	Chevrolet	50.105	191.119
2	55	Kenny Wallace	Andy Petree Racing	Chevrolet	50.357	190.162
3	8	Dale Earnhardt Jr. (R)	Dale Earnhardt, Inc.	Chevrolet	50.465	189.755
Full first practice results

=== Second practice ===
The second practice session was held on Saturday, October 14, at 9:15 AM EST. The session lasted for one hour and 15 minutes. Joe Gibbs Racing's Bobby Labonte set the fastest time in the session, with a lap of 48.248 and an average speed of 198.475 mph (319.415 km/h).

Pos.	#	Driver	Team	Make	Time	Speed
1	18	Bobby Labonte	Joe Gibbs Racing	Pontiac	48.248	198.475
2	77	Robert Pressley	Jasper Motorsports	Ford	48.583	197.106
3	1	Steve Park (N)	Dale Earnhardt, Inc.	Chevrolet	48.683	196.701
Full second practice results

=== Third practice ===
The final practice session, sometimes referred to as Happy Hour, was held on Saturday, October 14, at 12:45 PM EST. The session lasted for one hour. Penske-Kranefuss Racing's Rusty Wallace set the fastest time in the session, with a lap of 49.693 and an average speed of 192.703 mph (310.125 km/h).

Pos.	#	Driver	Team	Make	Time	Speed
1	2	Rusty Wallace	Penske-Kranefuss Racing	Ford	49.693	192.703
2	01	Ted Musgrave	Team SABCO	Chevrolet	49.701	192.672
3	10	Johnny Benson Jr.	MB2 Motorsports	Pontiac	49.875	192.000
Full Happy Hour practice results

== Qualifying ==
Qualifying was split into two rounds. The first round was held on Friday, October 13, at 4:00 PM EST. Each driver had two laps to set a fastest time; the fastest of the two counted as their official qualifying lap. During the first round, the top 25 drivers in the round was guaranteed a starting spot in the race. If a driver was not able to guarantee a spot in the first round, they had the option to scrub their time from the first round and try and run a faster lap time in a second round qualifying run, held on Saturday, October 14, at 11:45 AM EST. As with the first round, each driver had two laps to set a fastest time; the fastest of the two would count as their official qualifying lap. Positions 26–36 were decided on time, while positions 37–43 were based on provisionals. Six spots were awarded by the use of provisionals based on owner's points. The seventh was awarded to a past champion who has not otherwise qualified for the race. If no past champion needs the provisional, the next team in the owner points was awarded a provisional.

Joe Nemechek, driving for Andy Petree Racing, managed to win the pole, setting a time of 50.326 and an average speed of 190.279 miles per hour (306.224 km/h) in the first round.

Three drivers failed to qualify: Wally Dallenbach Jr., Blaise Alexander, & Hut Stricklin.

=== Full qualifying results ===
Pos.	#	Driver	Team	Make	Time	Speed
1	33	Joe Nemechek	Andy Petree Racing	Chevrolet	50.326	190.279
2	94	Bill Elliott	Bill Elliott Racing	Ford	50.388	190.045
3	8	Dale Earnhardt Jr. (R)	Dale Earnhardt, Inc.	Chevrolet	50.562	189.391
4	25	Jerry Nadeau	Hendrick Motorsports	Chevrolet	50.681	188.947
5	20	Tony Stewart	Joe Gibbs Racing	Pontiac	50.713	188.827
6	18	Bobby Labonte	Joe Gibbs Racing	Pontiac	50.737	188.738
7	55	Kenny Wallace	Andy Petree Racing	Chevrolet	50.811	188.463
8	24	Jeff Gordon (N)	Hendrick Motorsports	Chevrolet	50.817	188.441
9	71	Dave Marcis	Marcis Auto Racing	Chevrolet	50.844	188.341
10	1	Steve Park (N)	Dale Earnhardt, Inc.	Chevrolet	50.934	188.008
11	28	Ricky Rudd	Robert Yates Racing	Ford	50.948	187.956
12	88	Dale Jarrett	Robert Yates Racing	Ford	51.005	187.746
13	9	Stacy Compton (R)	Melling Racing	Ford	51.115	187.342
14	36	Ken Schrader	MB2 Motorsports	Pontiac	51.116	187.339
15	43	John Andretti	Petty Enterprises	Pontiac	51.122	187.317
16	16	Kevin Lepage	Roush Racing	Ford	51.231	186.918
17	5	Terry Labonte	Hendrick Motorsports	Chevrolet	51.247	186.860
18	7	Michael Waltrip	Ultra Motorsports	Chevrolet	51.262	186.805
19	4	Bobby Hamilton	Morgan–McClure Motorsports	Chevrolet	51.262	186.805
20	3	Dale Earnhardt (N)	Richard Childress Racing	Chevrolet	51.263	186.801
21	22	Ward Burton	Bill Davis Racing	Pontiac	51.296	186.681
22	26	Jimmy Spencer	Haas-Carter Motorsports	Ford	51.308	186.638
23	10	Johnny Benson Jr.	MB2 Motorsports	Pontiac	51.340	186.521
24	31	Mike Skinner	Richard Childress Racing	Chevrolet	51.439	186.162
25	21	Elliott Sadler	Wood Brothers Racing	Ford	51.462	186.079
Failed to lock in the first round
26	50	Ricky Craven	Midwest Transit Racing	Chevrolet	51.394	186.325
27	6	Mark Martin (N)	Roush Racing	Ford	51.466	186.065
28	60	Rich Bickle	Joe Bessey Racing	Chevrolet	51.474	186.036
29	14	Rick Mast	A. J. Foyt Racing	Pontiac	51.482	186.007
30	01	Ted Musgrave	Team SABCO	Chevrolet	51.484	186.000
31	44	Steve Grissom	Petty Enterprises	Pontiac	51.535	185.815
32	40	Sterling Marlin	Team SABCO	Chevrolet	51.552	185.754
33	93	Dave Blaney (R)	Bill Davis Racing	Pontiac	51.566	185.704
34	66	Darrell Waltrip	Haas-Carter Motorsports	Ford	51.576	185.668
35	32	Scott Pruett (R)	PPI Motorsports	Ford	51.583	185.643
36	17	Matt Kenseth (R)	Roush Racing	Ford	51.672	185.323
Provisionals
37	99	Jeff Burton (N)	Roush Racing	Ford	51.728	185.122
38	2	Rusty Wallace	Penske-Kranefuss Racing	Ford	51.757	185.018
39	97	Chad Little	Roush Racing	Ford	51.696	185.237
40	12	Jeremy Mayfield	Penske-Kranefuss Racing	Ford	52.069	183.910
41	77	Robert Pressley	Jasper Motorsports	Ford	51.757	185.018
42	11	Brett Bodine	Brett Bodine Racing	Ford	51.699	185.226
43	27	Mike Bliss (R)	Eel River Racing	Pontiac	51.805	184.847
Failed to qualify
44	75	Wally Dallenbach Jr.	Galaxy Motorsports	Ford	51.682	185.287
45	91	Blaise Alexander	LJ Racing	Chevrolet	52.104	183.786
46	90	Hut Stricklin	Donlavey Racing	Ford	52.221	183.375
Official first round qualifying results
Official starting lineup

== Race results ==
Fin	St	#	Driver	Team	Make	Laps	Led	Status	Pts	Winnings
1	20	3	Dale Earnhardt (N)	Richard Childress Racing	Chevrolet	188	34	running	180	$135,900
2	7	55	Kenny Wallace	Andy Petree Racing	Chevrolet	188	0	running	170	$98,170
3	1	33	Joe Nemechek	Andy Petree Racing	Chevrolet	188	0	running	165	$85,685
4	8	24	Jeff Gordon (N)	Hendrick Motorsports	Chevrolet	188	26	running	165	$82,100
5	17	5	Terry Labonte	Hendrick Motorsports	Chevrolet	188	4	running	160	$73,700
6	24	31	Mike Skinner	Richard Childress Racing	Chevrolet	188	3	running	155	$62,450
7	27	6	Mark Martin (N)	Roush Racing	Ford	188	8	running	151	$62,350
8	38	2	Rusty Wallace	Penske-Kranefuss Racing	Ford	188	1	running	147	$59,500
9	43	27	Mike Bliss (R)	Eel River Racing	Pontiac	188	4	running	143	$46,770
10	36	17	Matt Kenseth (R)	Roush Racing	Ford	188	2	running	139	$65,100
11	11	28	Ricky Rudd	Robert Yates Racing	Ford	188	0	running	130	$52,930
12	6	18	Bobby Labonte	Joe Gibbs Racing	Pontiac	188	7	running	132	$59,450
13	4	25	Jerry Nadeau	Hendrick Motorsports	Chevrolet	188	3	running	129	$51,730
14	3	8	Dale Earnhardt Jr. (R)	Dale Earnhardt, Inc.	Chevrolet	188	28	running	126	$49,260
15	12	88	Dale Jarrett	Robert Yates Racing	Ford	188	0	running	118	$66,185
16	31	44	Steve Grissom	Petty Enterprises	Pontiac	188	0	running	115	$51,250
17	25	21	Elliott Sadler	Wood Brothers Racing	Ford	188	0	running	112	$51,185
18	39	97	Chad Little	Roush Racing	Ford	188	0	running	109	$50,280
19	10	1	Steve Park (N)	Dale Earnhardt, Inc.	Chevrolet	188	0	running	106	$50,000
20	15	43	John Andretti	Petty Enterprises	Pontiac	188	1	running	108	$57,960
21	28	60	Rich Bickle	Joe Bessey Racing	Chevrolet	188	0	running	100	$52,160
22	21	22	Ward Burton	Bill Davis Racing	Pontiac	188	1	running	102	$55,750
23	13	9	Stacy Compton (R)	Melling Racing	Ford	188	2	running	99	$41,070
24	2	94	Bill Elliott	Bill Elliott Racing	Ford	188	40	running	101	$59,290
25	41	77	Robert Pressley	Jasper Motorsports	Ford	188	0	running	88	$40,910
26	42	11	Brett Bodine	Brett Bodine Racing	Ford	188	0	running	85	$37,135
27	5	20	Tony Stewart	Joe Gibbs Racing	Pontiac	187	12	running	87	$56,465
28	33	93	Dave Blaney (R)	Bill Davis Racing	Pontiac	187	0	running	79	$36,945
29	37	99	Jeff Burton (N)	Roush Racing	Ford	187	0	running	76	$56,875
30	26	50	Ricky Craven	Midwest Transit Racing	Chevrolet	187	0	running	73	$38,105
31	29	14	Rick Mast	A. J. Foyt Racing	Pontiac	187	0	running	70	$36,715
32	30	01	Ted Musgrave	Team SABCO	Chevrolet	186	1	engine	72	$47,820
33	23	10	Johnny Benson Jr.	MB2 Motorsports	Pontiac	186	0	running	64	$39,640
34	18	7	Michael Waltrip	Ultra Motorsports	Chevrolet	186	1	running	66	$47,495
35	34	66	Darrell Waltrip	Haas-Carter Motorsports	Ford	186	0	running	58	$39,620
36	19	4	Bobby Hamilton	Morgan–McClure Motorsports	Chevrolet	167	3	accident	60	$46,935
37	14	36	Ken Schrader	MB2 Motorsports	Pontiac	166	6	engine	57	$36,400
38	22	26	Jimmy Spencer	Haas-Carter Motorsports	Ford	134	0	handling	49	$44,350
39	35	32	Scott Pruett (R)	PPI Motorsports	Ford	120	0	engine	46	$36,300
40	9	71	Dave Marcis	Marcis Auto Racing	Chevrolet	101	1	engine	48	$36,225
41	32	40	Sterling Marlin	Team SABCO	Chevrolet	81	0	engine	40	$44,175
42	40	12	Jeremy Mayfield	Penske-Kranefuss Racing	Ford	69	0	engine	37	$44,125
43	16	16	Kevin Lepage	Roush Racing	Ford	20	0	ignition	34	$44,086
Failed to qualify
44		75	Wally Dallenbach Jr.	Galaxy Motorsports	Ford					
45		91	Blaise Alexander	LJ Racing	Chevrolet					
46		90	Hut Stricklin	Donlavey Racing	Ford					
Official race results

== Media ==
=== Television ===
The race was aired live on ESPN. Jerry Punch, 1973 Cup Series champion Benny Parsons and two-time NASCAR Cup Series champion Ned Jarrett called the race from the broadcast booth. Punch filled in for regular commentator Bob Jenkins, who was covering ABC's coverage of the Excite 500 IndyCar Series race at Texas Motor Speedway. Bill Weber, John Kernan and Ray Dunlap handled pit road for the television side.

ESPN
Booth announcers		Pit reporters
Lap-by-lap	Color-commentators	Pit reporters
Jerry Punch	Ned Jarrett; Benny Parsons	Bill Weber; John Kernan; Ray Dunlap

== Standings after the race ==
Drivers' Championship standings

	Pos	Driver	Points
	1	Bobby Labonte	4,537
1	2	Dale Earnhardt	4,327 (-210)
1	3	Jeff Burton	4,229 (-308)
	4	Dale Jarrett	4,135 (–402)
1	5	Ricky Rudd	4,102 (–435)
1	6	Tony Stewart	4,064 (–473)
	7	Mark Martin	3,999 (–538)
	8	Rusty Wallace	3,955 (–582)
1	9	Jeff Gordon	3,729 (–808)
1	10	Ward Burton	3,667 (–870)
Official driver's standings

- Note: Only the first 10 positions are included for the driver standings.

Previous race: 2000 UAW-GM Quality 500	NASCAR Winston Cup Series; 2000 season	Next race: 2000 Pop Secret Microwave Popcorn 400
