= Kenny Irwin Jr. =

American racing driver (1969–2000)

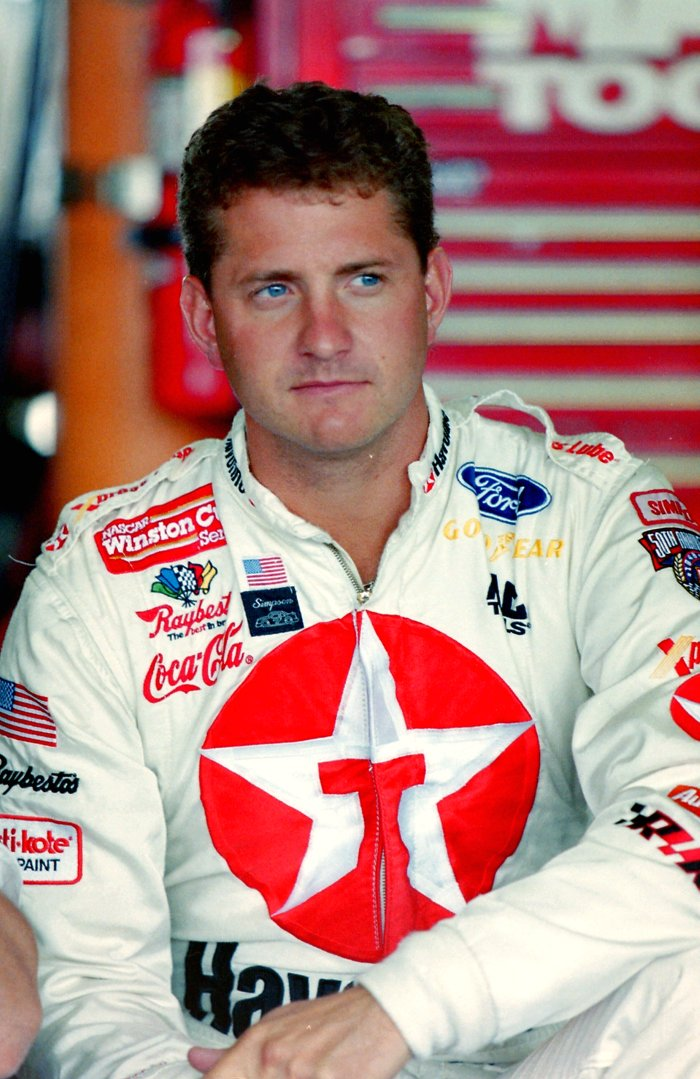
- Irwin in 1998
- Born: Kenneth Dale Irwin Jr. August 5, 1969; Indianapolis, Indiana, U.S.
- Died: July 7, 2000 (aged 30); Loudon, New Hampshire, U.S.
- Cause of death: Basilar skull fracture due to auto racing accident.
- Achievements: 1996 USAC National Midget Champion
- Awards: 1998 Winston Cup Series Rookie of the Year; 1997 Craftsman Truck Series Rookie of the Year

NASCAR Cup Series career
- 87 races run over 4 years
- Best finish: 19th (1999)
- First race: 1997 Exide NASCAR Select Batteries 400 (Richmond)
- Last race: 2000 Pepsi 400 (Daytona)
Wins	Top tens	Poles
0	12	3

NASCAR O'Reilly Auto Parts Series career
- 14 races run over 2 years
- Best finish: 50th (2000)
- First race: 1999 Coca-Cola 300 (Texas)
- Last race: 2000 Carquest Auto Parts 300 (Charlotte)
Wins	Top tens	Poles
0	4	0

NASCAR FedEx Freight Truck Series career
- 32 races run over 3 years
- Best finish: 10th (1997)
- First race: 1996 Chevy Desert Star Classic (Phoenix)
- Last race: 1998 GM Goodwrench Service Plus / AC Delco 300 (Phoenix)
- First win: 1997 Florida Dodge Dealers 400K (Homestead)
- Last win: 1997 Pronto Auto Parts 400K (Texas)
Wins	Top tens	Poles
2	11	1

Kenneth Dale Irwin Jr. (August 5, 1969 – July 7, 2000) was an American stock car racing driver. He had driven in all three NASCAR national touring series, and had two total victories, both in the Craftsman Truck Series. Before that, he raced in the United States Auto Club against Tony Stewart, who was one of his fiercest rivals. He died as a result of injuries suffered in a crash during a practice session at New Hampshire Motor Speedway.

== Early life ==
Irwin grew up in Indianapolis and was the third youngest of four children. He began racing quarter-midgets before he was in the second grade. He graduated from Lawrence North High School in 1988 where he played varsity soccer, while continuing his career as a driver. Between 1988 and 1991, he earned his SCCA competition license and competed in the GT1 category, driving a turbocharged Buick Grand National, then raced for his father in the IMSA American Challenge (road racing) stock car series, all while he was still a teenager.

Irwin then went on to race in USAC. He began open wheel racing in 1991. He had seven career USAC Sprint Car Series wins, and was the series Rookie of the Year in 1993. In 1994, he was the USAC Silver Crown Series Rookie of the Year and finished second in the 1995 USAC standings. In 1996, he was the USAC National Midget Series champion. After his successful run in USAC, many open-wheel enthusiasts began comparing him to NASCAR star Jeff Gordon.

== NASCAR ==
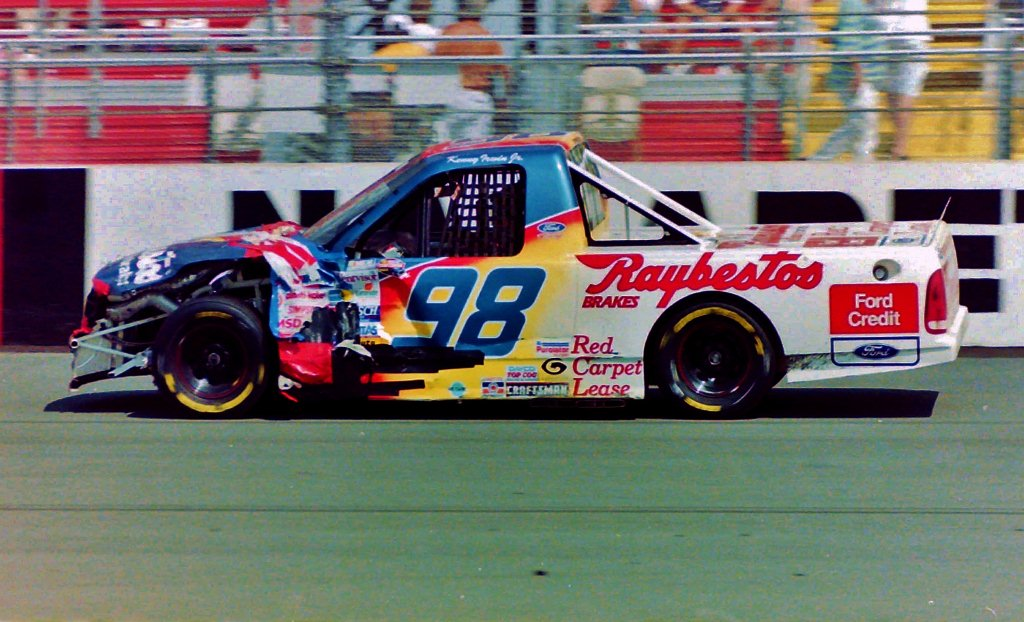
Irwin's 1997 truck

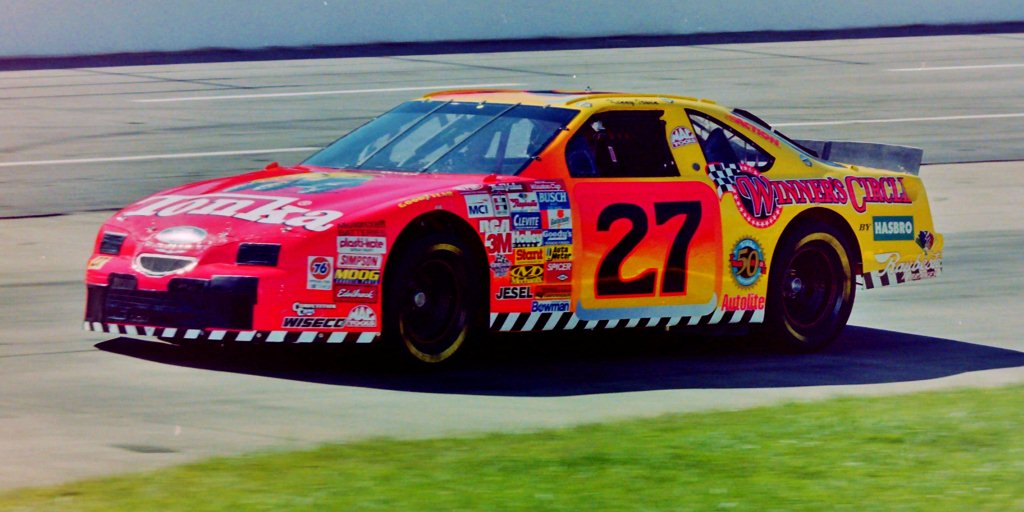
Irwin's 1997 Winston Cup car

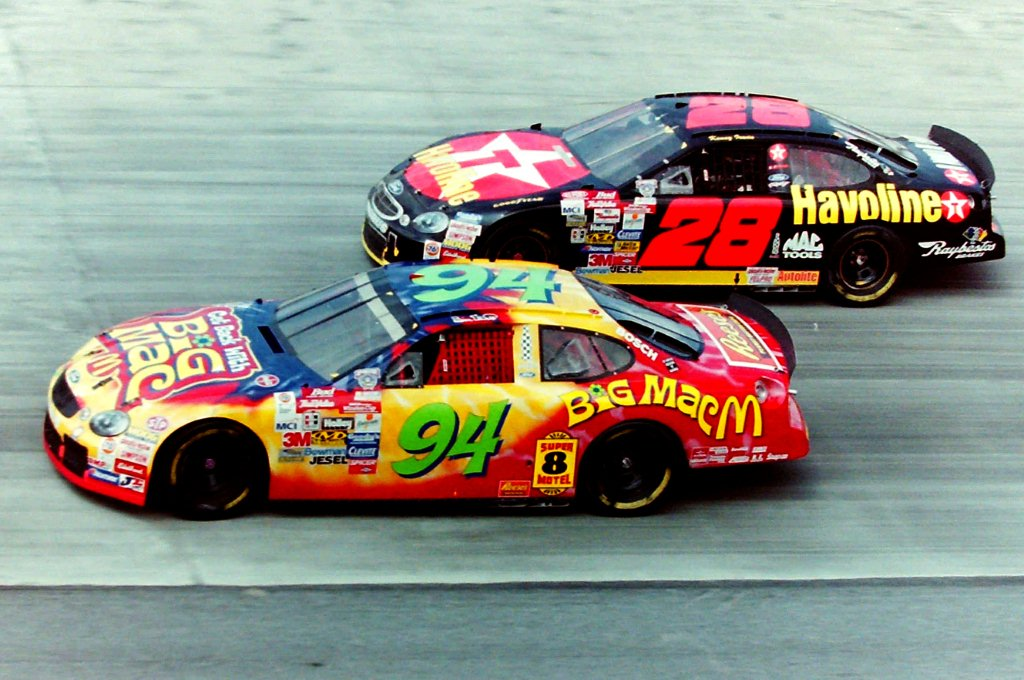
Irwin (No. 28) racing Matt Kenseth at Dover, 1998

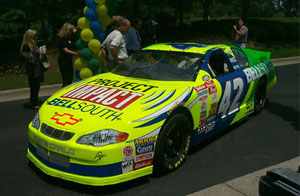
Irwin's Project Impact car, May 2000

Irwin began his major-league NASCAR career in the Craftsman Truck Series. He made his debut in that series in 1996 at Phoenix International Raceway, driving the No. 26 Ford F-150 for MB Motorsports. He started and finished 32nd after an engine failure. In his second start at Richmond International Raceway, he won the pole in the No. 62 Raybestos Ford for Liberty Racing, finishing fifth in the event.

Irwin moved up to drive full-time in 1997, driving the No. 98 Ford for Liberty Racing. He had two wins, seven top-fives, and ten top-ten finishes that season, on his way to a tenth-place finish in the final point standings. He also won Rookie of the Year honors that season. Irwin also made his debut in the Winston Cup Series in 1997 with David Blair Motorsports at Richmond. He qualified on the outside pole and led for twelve laps, finishing in eighth place. He ran three more races with Blair that season, qualifying no worse than eleventh.

"Everyone has been hoping to find the next Jeff Gordon, I think we found him."

— David Blair, after the 1997 season-ending race at Atlanta Motor Speedway

Irwin won the 1998 Rookie of the Year award in the Cup Series driving the Robert Yates Racing No. 28 car, replacing Ernie Irvan. Irwin started the 1998 season by winning the Automobile Racing Club of America race in Daytona in February in a car owned by Yates. During that season, he had one pole, one top-five, and four top-ten finishes on his way to a disappointing 28th-place finish in the final points standings. In 1999, he had two poles, two top-five and six top-ten finishes, and finished in nineteenth place in the final points standings.

Irwin made his debut in the NASCAR Busch Series in 1999, driving the No. 11 Ford Taurus owned by his teammate, Dale Jarrett, and then-Green Bay Packers quarterback Brett Favre. He had two fifth-place finishes in five starts in the series during the 1999 season, at Texas Motor Speedway and Dover International Speedway, respectively.

Irwin is also known for one incident where he bumped the car of Tony Stewart, a former rival of his in USAC open-wheel competition, into the wall in the NAPA Autocare 500 at Martinsville Speedway. After Stewart wrecked Irwin twice in the same race in turn four, Irwin retaliated against Stewart by spinning him in turn 1 on the restart. Stewart exited his wrecked car, clapped at Irwin, threw his gloves at his car, and tried to enter Irwin's car as it was driving under the caution flag in a show of displeasure.

For the 2000 season, Irwin was tabbed by Felix Sabates to replace Joe Nemechek in Team SABCO's No. 42 Chevrolet. He had a single top-ten finish, fourth at Talladega Superspeedway, in his first seventeen races with the team. He made nine starts in the Busch Series for SABCO as well, posting a best finish of ninth at Talladega. His final race for the team was at Daytona International Speedway in the Pepsi 400, finishing 22nd; he was seen as having a bright future with the team, which had just had a majority interest purchased by Chip Ganassi.

== Death ==
During practice for the thatlook.com 300 at New Hampshire Motor Speedway on July 7, 2000, Irwin slammed head on into the wall, causing his car to flip onto its side. According to fellow driver Brett Bodine speaking to CNN, the car slid along its side for a long time before rolling on its roof. Irwin likely died instantly of a basilar skull fracture at the age of 30. Fellow Indiana native (and rival) Tony Stewart would win the race that Sunday, and donate the trophy to Irwin's parents. Irwin's accident was blamed on a stuck throttle, which was the same cause of the accident that had killed Adam Petty at nearly that exact spot on the track just two months prior. Ted Musgrave drove the renumbered No. 01 car for the remainder of the 2000 season. The car was renumbered to 41 in 2002 and Sabates brought back the 42 number in 2003 with driver Jamie McMurray.

Irwin's parents founded the Kenny Irwin Jr. Foundation and the Dare to Dream Camp for underprivileged children located in New Castle, Indiana, in his honor. The 2000 Brickyard 400, held on what would have been Irwin's 31st birthday, was dedicated in his memory.

== Motorsports career results ==
=== NASCAR ===
(key) (Bold – Pole position awarded by qualifying time. Italics – Pole position earned by points standings or practice time. * – Most laps led.)

==== Winston Cup Series ====
NASCAR Winston Cup Series results
Year	Team	No.	Make	1	2	3	4	5	6	7	8	9	10	11	12	13	14	15	16	17	18	19	20	21	22	23	24	25	26	27	28	29	30	31	32	33	34	NWCC	Pts	Ref
1997	David Blair Motorsports	27	Ford	DAY	CAR	RCH	ATL	DAR	TEX	BRI	MAR	SON	TAL	CLT	DOV	POC	MCH	CAL	DAY	NHA	POC	IND	GLN	MCH	BRI	DAR	RCH; 8	NHA	DOV	MAR; 37	CLT	TAL	CAR; DNQ	PHO; 20	ATL; 25			49th	390	
1998	Yates Racing	28	Ford	DAY; 19	CAR; 26	LVS; 36	ATL; 5*	DAR; 39	BRI; 43	TEX; 39	MAR; 19	TAL; 40	CAL; 16	CLT; DNQ	DOV; 33	RCH; 9	MCH; 13	POC; 11	SON; 9	NHA; 33	POC; 22	IND; 38	GLN; 37	MCH; 16	BRI; 15	NHA; 11	DAR; 41	RCH; 10	DOV; 40	MAR; 27	CLT; 20	TAL; 43	DAY; 32	PHO; 40	CAR; 33	**ATL**; 16		28th	2760	
1999	Yates Racing	28	Ford	DAY; 3	CAR; 23	LVS; 41	ATL; 23	DAR; 35	**TEX**; 15	BRI; 11	MAR; 36	TAL; 35	CAL; 13	RCH; 40	CLT; 15	DOV; 10	MCH; 11	POC; 18	SON; 22	DAY; 14	NHA; 26	POC; 43	IND; 13	GLN; 26	MCH; 34	BRI; 24	**DAR**; 31	RCH; 5	NHA; 10	DOV; 10	MAR; 39	CLT; 15	TAL; 10	CAR; 13	PHO; 21	HOM; 33	ATL; 29	19th	3338	
2000	Team SABCO	42	Chevy	DAY; 14	CAR; 22	LVS; 24	ATL; 24	DAR; 38	BRI; 40	TEX; 17	MAR; 37	TAL; 4	CAL; 42	RCH; 42	CLT; 24	DOV; 17	MCH; 35	POC; 25	SON; 23	DAY; 22	NHA; Wth	POC	IND	GLN	MCH	BRI	DAR	RCH	NHA	DOV	MAR	CLT	TAL	CAR	PHO	HOM	ATL	42nd	1440	

===== Daytona 500 =====
Year	Team	Manufacturer	Start	Finish
1998	Yates Racing	Ford	38	19
1999	Yates Racing	Ford	41	3
2000	Team SABCO	Chevy	18	14

==== Busch Series ====
NASCAR Busch Series results
Year	Team	No.	Make	1	2	3	4	5	6	7	8	9	10	11	12	13	14	15	16	17	18	19	20	21	22	23	24	25	26	27	28	29	30	31	32	NBSC	Pts	Ref
1994		02	Chevy	DAY	CAR	RCH	ATL	MAR	DAR	HCY	BRI	ROU	NHA	NZH	CLT	DOV	MYB	GLN	MLW	SBO	TAL	HCY	IRP; DNQ	MCH	BRI	DAR	RCH	DOV	CLT	MAR	CAR					NA	-	
1997	Liberty Racing	98	Ford	DAY; DNQ	CAR	RCH	ATL	LVS	DAR	HCY	TEX; DNQ	BRI	NSV	TAL	NHA	NZH	CLT	DOV	SBO	GLN	MLW	MYB	GTY													NA	-	
1997	Liberty Racing	98	Chevy																					IRP; DNQ	MCH	BRI	DAR	RCH	DOV	CLT	CAL	CAR	HOM			NA	-	
1998	Porter Racing	48	Ford	DAY	CAR	LVS	NSV	DAR	BRI	TEX	HCY	TAL	NHA	NZH	CLT; DNQ	DOV	RCH	PPR	GLN	MLW	MYB	CAL	SBO	IRP	MCH	BRI	DAR	RCH	DOV	CLT	GTY	CAR	ATL	HOM		NA	-	
1999	Jarrett/Favre Motorsports	11	Ford	DAY	CAR	LVS	ATL	DAR	TEX; 5	NSV	BRI	TAL	CAL; DNQ	NHA	RCH	NZH	CLT; DNQ	DOV; 11	SBO	GLN	MLW	MYB	PPR	GTY	IRP; 16	MCH; 33	BRI; DNQ	DAR	RCH; DNQ	DOV; 5	CLT; DNQ	CAR	MEM	PHO	HOM	61st	619	
2000	SABCO Racing	42	Chevy	DAY; 39	CAR; 31	LVS; DNQ	ATL; 10	DAR; 19	BRI; 30	TEX; 16	NSV	TAL; 9	CAL; 32	RCH; DNQ	NHA	CLT; 20	DOV	SBO	MYB	GLN	MLW	NZH	PPR	GTY	IRP	MCH	BRI	DAR	RCH	DOV	CLT	CAR	MEM	PHO	HOM	50th	852	

==== Craftsman Truck Series ====
NASCAR Craftsman Truck Series results
Year	Team	No.	Make	1	2	3	4	5	6	7	8	9	10	11	12	13	14	15	16	17	18	19	20	21	22	23	24	25	26	27	NCTC	Pts	Ref
1996	MB Motorsports	26	Ford	HOM	PHO; 32	POR	EVG	TUS	CNS	HPT	BRI	NZH	MLW	LVL	I70	IRP	FLM	GLN	NSV												45th	468	
1996	Liberty Racing	62	Ford																	**RCH**; 5	NHA	MAR	NWS	SON							45th	468	
1996	Liberty Racing	98	Ford																						MMR; 15	PHO; 26	LVS; 40				45th	468	
1997	Liberty Racing	98	Ford	WDW; 7	TUS; 14	HOM; 1	PHO; 17	POR; 15	EVG; 5	I70; 14	NHA; 5	TEX; 1	BRI; 26	NZH; 27	MLW; 15	LVL; 18	CNS; 14	HPT; 18	IRP; 7	FLM; 25	NSV; 21	GLN; 28	RCH; 5	MAR; 8	SON; 31	MMR; 16	CAL; 3	PHO; 4	LVS; 25		10th	3220	
1998	Ultra Motorsports	28	Ford	WDW	HOM	PHO	POR	EVG	I70	GLN	TEX	BRI	MLW	NZH	CAL	PPR	IRP	NHA	FLM	NSV	HPT	LVL	RCH	MEM	GTY	MAR	SON	MMR	PHO; 20	LVS	92nd	103	

==== Winston West Series ====
NASCAR Winston West Series results
Year	Team	No.	Make	1	2	3	4	5	6	7	8	9	10	11	12	13	14	NWWC	Pts	Ref
1997	Yates Racing	28	Ford	TUS	AMP	SON	TUS	MMR	LVS	CAL	EVG	POR	PPR	AMP	SON	MMR	LVS; 28	75th	89	

=== ARCA Bondo/Mar-Hyde Series ===
(key) (Bold – Pole position awarded by qualifying time. Italics – Pole position earned by points standings or practice time. * – Most laps led.)

ARCA Bondo/Mar-Hyde Series results
Year	Team	No.	Make	1	2	3	4	5	6	7	8	9	10	11	12	13	14	15	16	17	18	19	20	21	22	ABMHSC	Pts	Ref
1998	David Blair Motorsports	27	Ford	DAY; 1*	ATL	SLM	CLT	MEM	MCH	POC	SBS	TOL	PPR	POC	KIL	FRS	ISF	ATL	DSF	SLM	TEX	WIN	CLT	TAL	ATL	NA	-	

Preceded by Rodney Orr	NASCAR Cup Series fatal accidents 2000	Succeeded by Dale Earnhardt
Achievements
Preceded by Mike Skinner	NASCAR Winston Cup Series Rookie of the Year; 1998	Succeeded by Tony Stewart
Preceded by Bryan Reffner	NASCAR Craftsman Truck Series Rookie of the Year; 1997	Succeeded by Greg Biffle
