= EID1 =

Protein-coding gene in the species Homo sapiens

Available structures
PDB	Ortholog search: PDBe RCSB
PDB	List of PDB id codes 4NUF

Identifiers
- Aliases: EID1, C15orf3, CRI1, EID-1, IRO45620, PTD014, RBP21, PNAS-22, EP300 interacting inhibitor of differentiation 1
- External IDs: OMIM: 605894; MGI: 1889651; HomoloGene: 49376; GeneCards: EID1; OMA:EID1 - orthologs

Gene location (Human)
Chr.	Chromosome 15 (human)
Band	15q21.1	Start	48,878,134 bp
Band	15q21.1	End	48,880,173 bp

Gene location (Mouse)
Chr.	Chromosome 2 (mouse)
Band	2|2 F1	Start	125,515,015 bp
Band	2|2 F1	End	125,516,705 bp
RNA expression pattern
Bgee	Human / Mouse (ortholog); Top expressed in: tendon of biceps brachii; Achilles tendon; germinal epithelium; right ventricle; internal globus pallidus; seminal vesicula; superficial temporal artery; ganglionic eminence; retinal pigment epithelium; myocardium / Top expressed in: barrel cortex; dorsomedial hypothalamic nucleus; Gonadal ridge; median eminence; human fetus; fossa; atrium; habenula; condyle; subiculum; More reference expression data
BioGPS	n/a
Gene ontology
Molecular function	protein binding; histone acetyltransferase binding; transcription corepressor activity; histone acetyltransferase regulator activity
Cellular component	cytoplasm; nucleus; nucleoplasm; cytoplasmic ribonucleoprotein granule
Biological process	cell cycle; cell differentiation; negative regulation of transcription, DNA-templated; regulation of transcription, DNA-templated; transcription, DNA-templated; negative regulation of transcription by RNA polymerase II; regulation of histone acetylation; regulation of cell differentiation
Sources:Amigo / QuickGO
Orthologs
Species	Human	Mouse
Entrez	23741	58521
Ensembl	ENSG00000255302	ENSMUSG00000091337
UniProt	Q9Y6B2	Q9DCR4
RefSeq (mRNA)	NM_014335	NM_025613
RefSeq (protein)	NP_055150	NP_079889
Location (UCSC)	Chr 15: 48.88 – 48.88 Mb	Chr 2: 125.52 – 125.52 Mb
PubMed search
- Wikidata
View/Edit Human	View/Edit Mouse

EP300-interacting inhibitor of differentiation 1 is a protein that in humans is encoded by the EID1 gene.

== Interactions ==
EID1 has been shown to interact with EP300 and retinoblastoma protein. Represses MYOD1 transactivation, and inhibits histone acetyltransferase activity of EP300 and CBP.

== Function ==
EID1 encodes a transcriptional regulatory protein that has been implicated in cell differentiation and negative regulation of transcription. It enables histone acetyltransferase binding activity and acting upstream of or within the negative regulation of transcription by RNA polymerase II.

== Structure ==
EID1 is a protein-coding gene whose product is assigned to the EID family.

== Isoforms ==
EID1 undergoes alternative splicing. There are multiple isoforms.

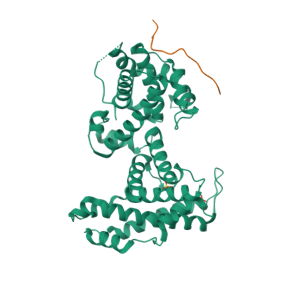

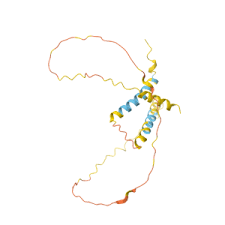
A predicted model of the EID1 protein

== Expression ==
EID1 is a broadly expressed human gene that does not show strong restriction to a single tissue. Its RNA expression pattern is classified as low tissue specificity, placing it among genes detected across many tissue contexts such as the heart, skeletal muscle, pancreas, brain, testis, etc.

EID1 is also grouped with predicted intracellular proteins, which is consistent with its assignment as a non-secreted cellular regulatory protein.

== Subcellular localization ==
The EID1 protein is in both the nucleus and the cytoplasm. It is further localized to the nucleoplasm and to cytoplasmic ribonucleoprotein granules.

== Post-translational regulation ==
EID1 is subject to post-translational regulation through ubiquitin-dependent proteolysis. The protein contains a modular peptidic degron that is recognized by an SCF ubiquitin ligase complex whose substrate-recognition component is FBOX21.

This complex mediates polyubiquitylation of EID1 and is necessary for efficient degradation of the protein in both proliferating and quiescent cells.

EID1 is described as unstable and short-lived, also that its degradation is especially pronounced in G0 cells. It was further reported that the degron overlaps in part with the RB1-binding domain of EID1, raising the possibility that binding interactions and protein turnover are automatically connected.

== Myoblast differentiation ==
Studies have implicated EID1 as in control of myogenic differentiation. A study of the Prader-Willi syndrome protein necdin identified a direct interaction between necdin and EID1. In that study, EID1 was described as suppressing transcriptional activation of genes required for myoblast differentiation, while necdin promoted differentiation by binding EID1 and relieving its repression of MyoD-dependent transcription. It was also reported that EID1 is degraded in myoblasts as cells exit the cell cycle, which further links the regulation of EID1 abundance to the progression of muscle differentiation.

== Studies in mice ==
The role of EID1 in the brain has been investigated using Eid1-knockout mouse models. In one transcriptomic study, RNA sequencing of the Eid1-knockout mouse brain identified 2,531 genes with altered expression compared to the wild-type brain, and a follow-up qRT-PCR was used to confirm the reliability of the sequencing data. Based on the changes, it was proposed that EID1 links cell proliferation in the brain.

Orthologs of EID1 have been identified in other mammals, including the rat gene Eid1, indicating that the gene is conserved across species.

== Relations ==
EID3 shares homology with a region of EID1 implicated in CBP/p300 binding. EID1 and EID3 both function as inhibitors of CBP/p300-dependent transcription in a tissue-specific manner.

EID2 was identified as a second family member and was described as a homolog of EID1 with inhibitory effects on MyoD-dependent transcription and muscle differentiation.

== Nuclear receptor interactions ==
EID1 has been identified as an interacting partner of the orphan nuclear receptor SF-1. EID1 was reported to suppress SF-1 mediated transactivation, indicating that EID1 can modulate transcriptional output downstream of steroidogenic factor signaling. The same study found that the inhibitory effect was not reproduced with several other nuclear receptors, including LRH-1, ERRy, and mCAR, which suggests a degree of specificity in the interaction between EID1 and SF-1.
