= Call–Exner bodies =

Pathognomic of Granulosa cell tumor ovary (Sex Cord Tumor)

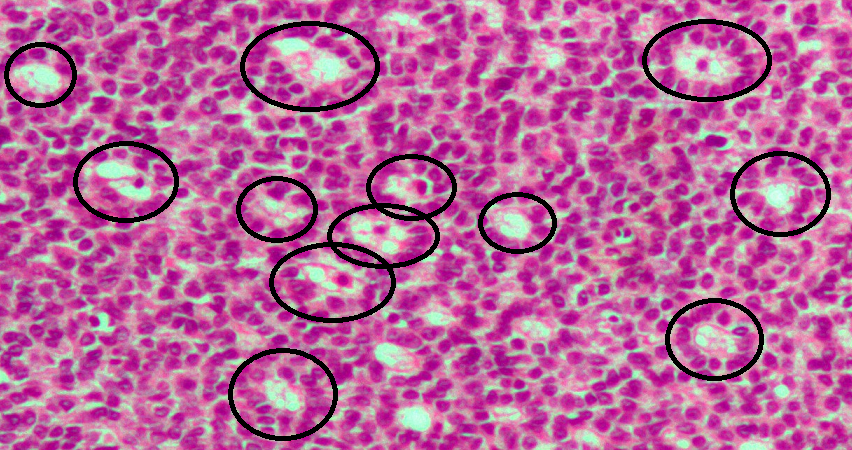
Call–Exner bodies marked with black circles in an intermediate-high magnification micrograph of a granulosa cell tumour, a type of sex cord stromal tumour. H&E stain.

Call–Exner bodies are small, circular, fluid-filled spaces commonly found in granulosa cell tumors, which occur in the ovary. Granulosa cells surround these spaces and form a "rosette-like" structure that contains cell debris or hyaline basement membrane material. These structures are common microfollicular patterns found to be present in 30% of granulosa cell tumor cases, especially when the tumor cells are mature or well-differentiated.

Call-Exner bodies received their name from the two scientists who discovered them in 1875. These scientists were American physician Emma Louise Call and Austrian physiologist and psychologist Sigmund Exner.

They can be identified through immunohistochemistry stains using antibodies specific to inhibin, which the granulosa cell tumors produce. After staining these cells, the small, white, follicle-like structures produced by the Call-Exner Bodies appear to be surrounded by purple, elongated nuclei. These nuclei sometimes take on a characteristic "coffee-bean" like appearance. These visualization techniques have been used to find Call-Exner bodies in a variety of animals, including sea otters, as it is easy to identify the fluid and cell debris filled areas surrounded by granulosa cells.

Although Call-Exner bodies are common in adult granulosa cell tumor diagnoses, they are not present in all of these tumors. Additionally, in juvenile granulosa cell tumors, it is more uncommon to see Call-Exner bodies compared to adult tumors of the same type.

== Composition ==
Upon completing a stain of granulosa cell tumors, and studying the Call-Exner bodies, it was determined that they contained aggregations of material similar to those in the basement membrane of cells, and these made up the matrix of the bodies. Call-Exner bodies have also been found to contain follicular fluid upon histology staining, which is crucial for the development of follicles within the ovaries. Another research study conducted in 1989 concluded that the Call-Exner bodies contained hyaluronic acid with a distinct peripheral membrane and proteoglycans. It was also determined there was no possibility for the transfer of materials between the small bodies and other fluid-filled cavities such as the antrum. Therefore, researchers concluded that these Call-Exner bodies were produced by secretion rather than cell death.

Research completed on bovine, or cow, ovarian follicles indicated the presence of Call-Exner bodies, which could be related to those in other species. Upon utilizing electron microscopy, it was discovered that many of the bodies contains groupings of basal lamina type material, although the composition was not consistent throughout. Some contained large groupings of irregularly shaped basal lamina, whereas others contained unassembled basal lamina materials. Examples of materials found within the bodies included type IV collagen alpha chain protein components one through five, as well as protein chain components of laminin. The ratio of these two proteins also appeared to change over time, which is consistent with normal ovarian follicle basal lamina development. This suggested that they are secreted by the same type of cell.

== Function ==
Some research suggests Call-Exner bodies are an attempt to form a basement membrane, however it is not confirmed. Although the function of Call-Exner bodies is not explicitly known, another extracellular matrix called the focimatrix that forms during later ovarian follicular development is very similar to the appearance of Call-Exner bodies. It also contains basal-lamina like material in a greater amount compared to Call-Exner bodies. Because granulosa cells appear as polarized epithelial cells in the beginning of development, the role of the focimatrix is predicted to be reducing the polarity is granulosa cells so that they can develop into mesenchymal luteal cells that eventually play a role in the corpus luteum that is involved in ovulation. It is possible that Call-Exner bodies result from early expression of the focimatrix as they contain similar features. Some researchers have suggested that Call-Exner bodies likely represent unusual basal lamina production from the granulosa cell tumors, causing the polarity to be altered, similar to the role of the focimatrix. However, the impact of the bodies doesn't seem to have too damaging of an effect on the development of the follicles as they would normally occur.

The focimatrix is also known as an aggregation of basal-lamina like material that develops in between granulosa cells but doesn't completely surround them. Therefore, it is not known to have the same functions as a normal basal lamina, similar to Call-Exner body aggregates. As follicles of the ovaries increase in size, the expression of the focimatrix increases until ovulation begins, at which point the matrix is believed to depolarize the granulosa cell membrane. This depolarization then aids in the maturation of the granulosa cells to luteal cells.

Although the focimatrix and the Call-Exner bodies do not share all of the same proteins, they share the majority of them, which may further indicate a shared purpose. The focimatrix has been found to contain the same laminin protein chains, as well as type IV collagen alpha chains 1 and 2. However, the focimatrix also contains the additional proteins nidogen-1 and perlecan. Alpha chains 3, 4, and 5 are also absent in the focimatrix.

== Regulation ==
Due to the similarities in makeup between the focimatrix and the Call-Exner bodies, their genetic regulation may be similar. According to research, the p73 gene is linked to the regulation of important focimatrix genes as binding sites for the p73 protein were found near genes encoding focimatrix components like laminin and nidogen. Cells deficient in the p73 gene had troubles forming a normal focimatrix, indicating its importance in regulating the development of the focimatrix. Additional studies have corroborated this evidence through finding that the p73 gene is responsible for establishing cellular microenvironments through regulating the expression of cell-cell adhesion and extracellular matrix molecules. This type of control would be associated with the release of focimatrix components and therefore could be related to the release of components of Call-Exner bodies as well.

Due to the fact that the p73 gene is associated with the suppression of growth, it is possible that a deficiency of this gene could lead to cancer in granulosa cell tumors, as well as abnormal focimatrix formation in the form of Call-Exner bodies.

Another gene that has been found to be involved in granulosa cell tumors is the mutated version of the gene FGFR1, which can drive the formation of tumors in the absence of a mutated FOXL2 gene. In all cases of these tumors, Call-Exner bodies were present. This gene produces a tyrosine kinase receptor that activates many downstream factors through signal transduction that are involved in multiple different processes, including wound repair, growth, and survival of the cell. They are activated through the binding of a fibroblast growth factor that is specific to the receptor. According to research done on the expression of the FGFR1 gene in granulosa cells, the gene is heavily regulated during the development of follicles. Due to the characteristic of Call-Exner bodies as microfollicular patterns, it is possible that a mutated FGFR1 gene results in abnormal cellular differentiation and proliferation, which leads to the secretion of Call-Exner body components.

However, multiple genes that are commonly mutated in granulosa cell tumors contain evidence of Call-Exner bodies. The most commonly mutated gene found in nearly all cases of GCT, the FOXL2 gene, produces a transcription factor that regulates the cell cycle. It is also involved in the differentiation of the granulosa cells during follicular development. The mutated version of this gene is found to lead to abnormal cell growth and differentiation, which is associated with Call-Exner bodies. Therefore, there is no one gene that could be the cause of Call-Exner bodies, but rather it may be the abnormal result of many different genes in the cell that control the progression of follicle development in granulosa cells.

== Process of Formation ==
Since Call-Exner body components are believed to be secreted by surrounding cells, their process of formation is likely similar to that of the focimatrix, and extracellular matrix components in general. Components of basal-lamina like materials in Call-Exner bodies and the focimatrix are proteins that are also associated with the extracellular matrix, which are brought outside the cell through exocytosis and the secretory pathway.

Once genes are translated that encode proteins of the focimatrix and Call-Exner bodies, such as laminin and collagen, the protein is sent to the Golgi apparatus, where it undergoes alterations and is packaged into a secretory vesicle. This vesicle then fuses with the plasma membrane and releases its components outside of the cell.

== Visualization of Call-Exner Bodies ==
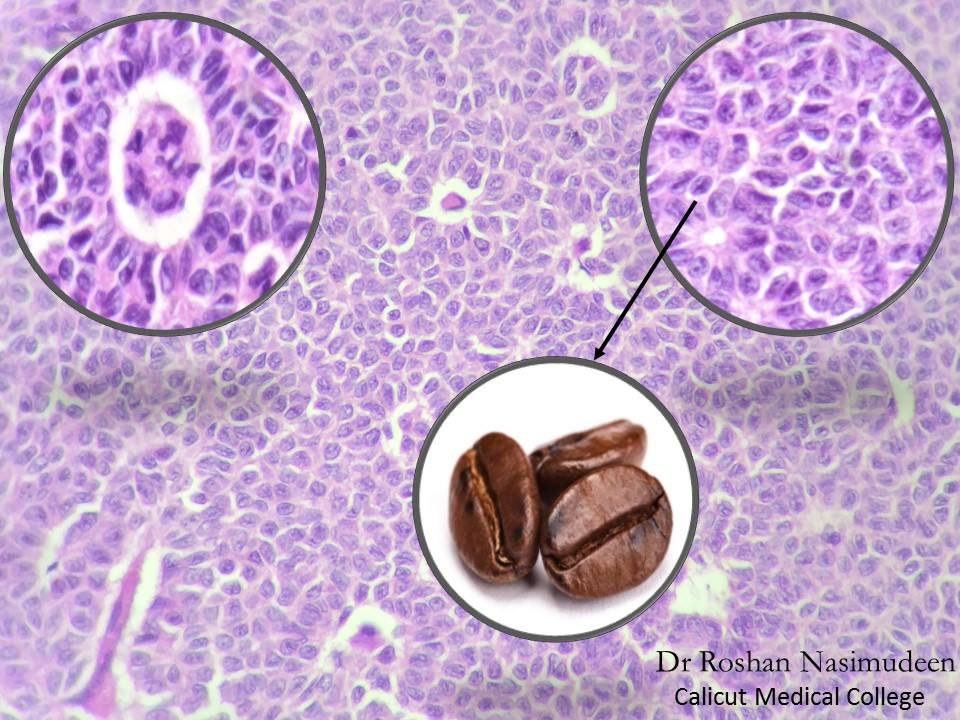
Granulosa cell tumor ovary- "Call-exner bodies and coffee bean nuclei- Granulosa cell tumour ovary by Dr. Roshan Nasimudeen, via Wikimedia Commons, licensed under CC BY-SA 4.0 (https://creativecommons.org/licenses/by-sa/4.0/deed.en). No changes were made."

One of the most common ways to visualize Call-Exner bodies is by preparing a tissue sample and staining the sample with hematoxylin and eosin, as well as adding antibodies that correspond to a common protein within the granulosa cell tumor.

In order to carry out this process, the first step is to fix the tissue samples with a compound such as formalin. This compound will cross-link proteins in the tissue sample. The sample is then dehydrated using compounds such as ethanol, and paraffin wax is added to embed the structure. The sample is then ready for sectioning into smaller pieces, typically 4-5 micrometers in diameter, so that it can be stained.

The antibodies that are added to the sample are proteins themselves, and they have specific sequences that attach to the proteins of interest. They also contain a marker in order to visualize the location of the protein. Common antibodies that bind to target proteins include antibodies against inhibin, SF-1, FOXL2, calretinin, and more. These protein products are exceedingly common in granulosa cell tumors, and their presence can indicate a positive result of a granulosa cell tumor.

Hematoxylin and eosin are the common stain compounds used for visualizing Call-Exner bodies. The hematoxylin will bind to acidic structures in the sample due to its basic nature, and the acidic eosin will bind to basic structures. Examples of these basic structures include proteins, which are present in different concentrations in Call-Exner bodies as basal-lamina like components. The result is a pink colored stain in between the granulosa cells, which are visualized with antibodies. Therefore, because eosin stains Call-Exner bodies, they are said to contain eosinophilic fluid.
