= SFI =

SFI may refer to:

== Organisations ==
- St. Francis Institution, a school in Melaka, Malaysia
- Santa Fe Institute, a theoretical research institute located in Santa Fe, US
- Saturday Football International, Taiwanese football club
- Science Foundation Ireland, the statutory body in the Republic of Ireland for funding basic science research
- Seattle Film Institute, a film school
- SFI Foundation (formerly SEMA Foundation), an organization administering equipment standards for motor sport
- Software Freedom International, a US non-profit company that coordinates Software Freedom Day
- STARFLEET: The International Star Trek Fan Association, Inc.
- Students' Federation of India, a left wing student organisation in India
- Sustainable Forestry Initiative, a forest certification standard and program of SFI Inc.
- Swedish Film Institute, for the Swedish film industry
- Swedish for immigrants, the national free Swedish language course
- Swimming Federation of India, the national governing body for aquatic sports in India
- Swiss Finance Institute, a Swiss research and scientific educational institute in the areas of banking and finance

== Technology ==
- Sequential fuel injection system
- SerDes Framer Interface, a standard for telecommunications
- Simple Firmware Interface, Intel's lightweight method for firmware to export static tables to the operating system
- Solar Flux Index, measure of solar radio flux per unit frequency

== Transportation ==
- Secure Freight Initiative, a US Department of Homeland Security program

== Other uses ==
- Postal code for Safi, Malta
- Sporadic fatal insomnia
