= Racing suit =

Clothing worn in auto racing

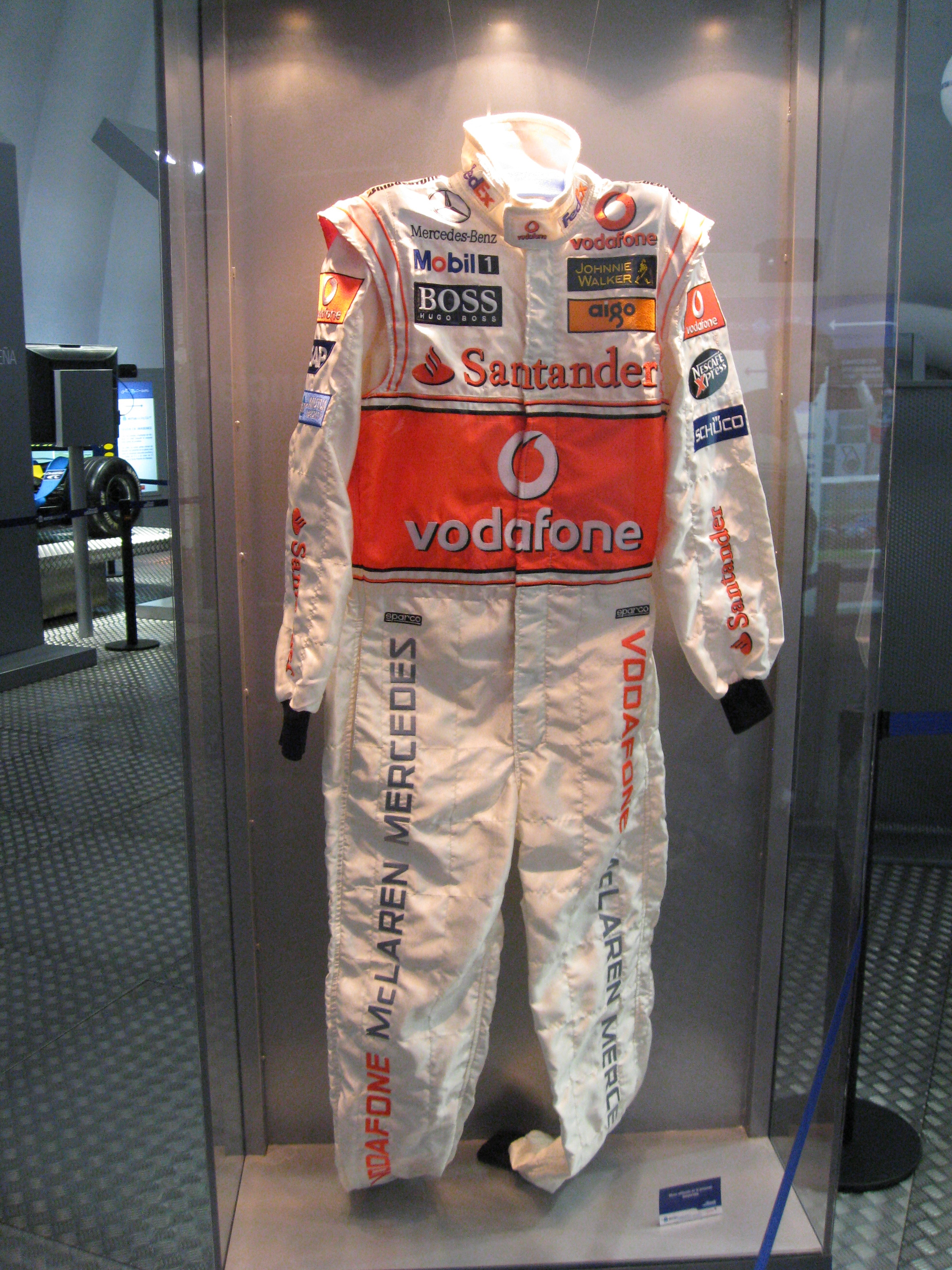
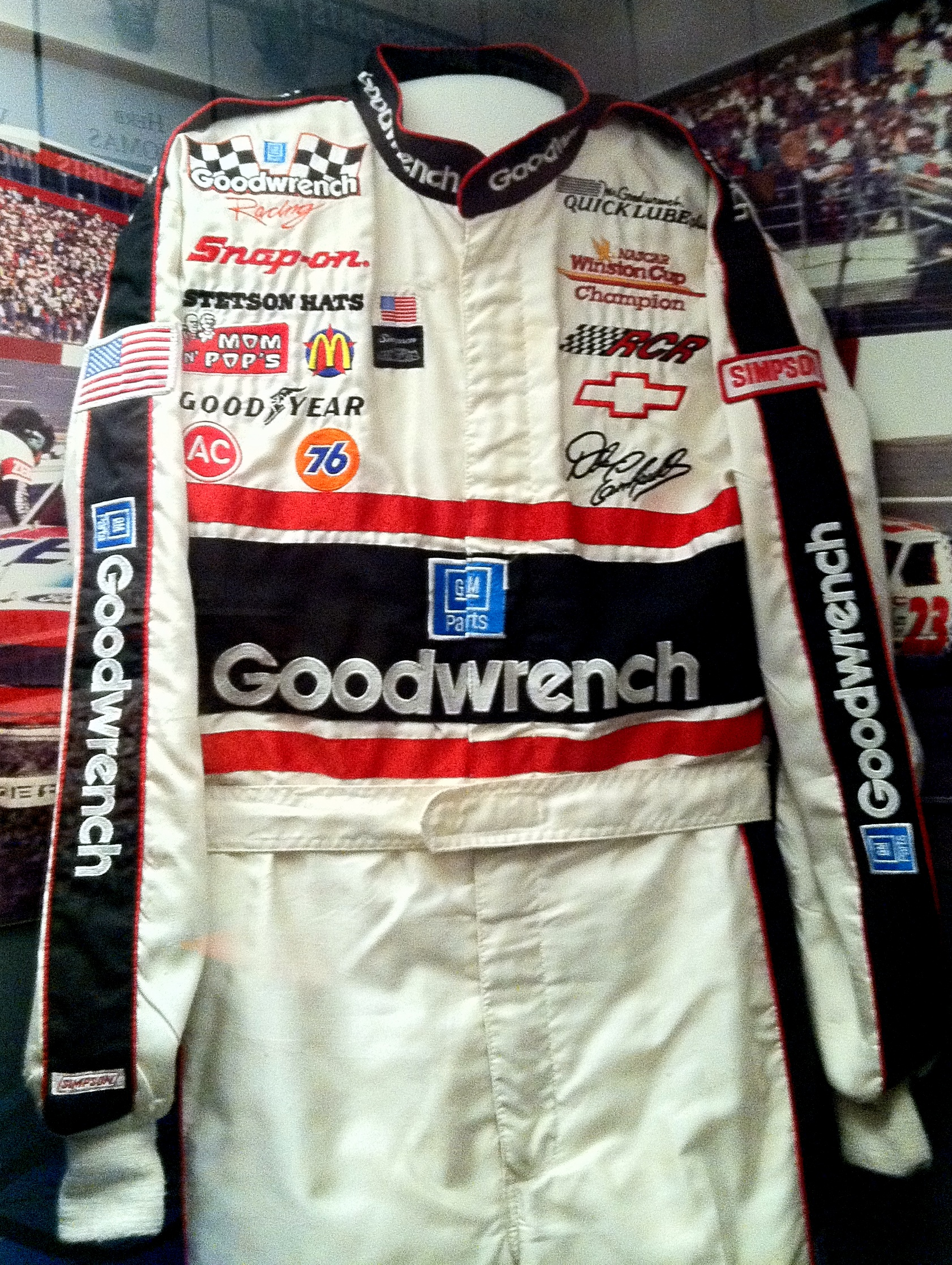
The 2007 racing suit of Formula One driver Fernando Alonso (left), and the 1990s suit of NASCAR driver Dale Earnhardt (right).

A racing suit or racing overalls, most commonly referred to as a firesuit due to its fire retardant properties, is clothing such as overalls worn in various forms of auto racing by racing drivers, crew members who work on the vehicles during races, track safety workers or marshals, and in some series commentators at the event.

In the early days of racing, most racing series had no mandated uniforms. Beginning in the 1950s and 1960s, specialized racing suits were designed to optimize driver temperature via heat transfer, and later to protect drivers from fire. By 1967, the majority of competitors in Formula One, NASCAR, the National Hot Rod Association (NHRA), United States Auto Club (USAC), and Champ Car (the predecessor to modern IndyCar) began wearing specialized fire suits. Most modern suits use Nomex, a material developed in the 1960s around the time fire suits emerged. The suits are also known for prominently displaying driver sponsors.

== Design and use ==
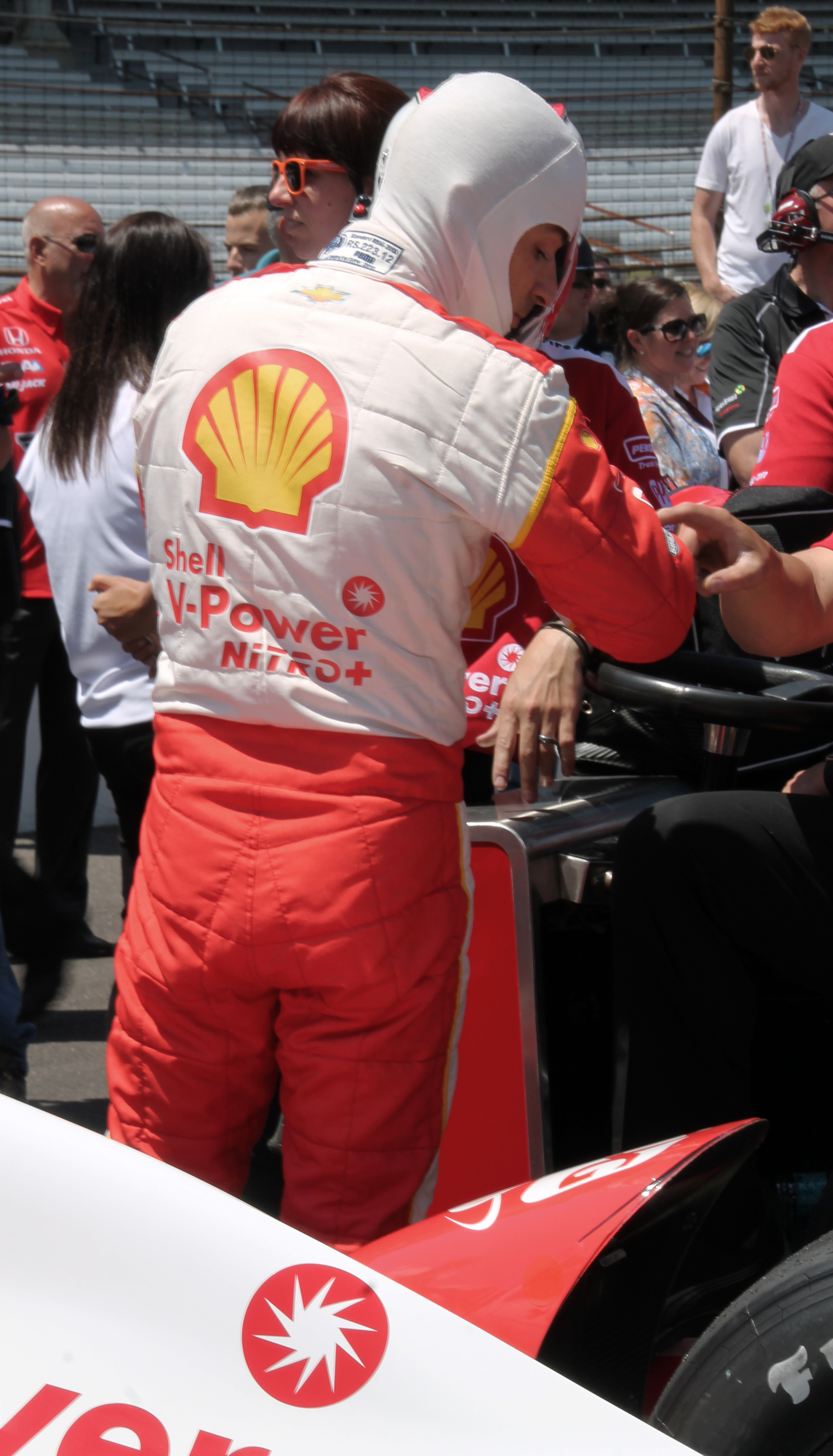
IndyCar driver Helio Castroneves wearing a Shell-branded Nomex firesuit and head sock

A racing suit is designed to cover the entire body of a driver, crew member, or marshall, including long sleeves and long pants legs. Typical driver suits are one-piece overalls, similar in appearance to a boilersuit. Other fire suits are two piece, consisting of a "jacket" and pants. The suits consist of a single or multiple layers of fire-retardant material. The suits also have special epaulettes or yokes on the shoulder area that act as "handles" in order to lift a driver strapped to a racing seat out of a vehicle. This is mandated under Fédération Internationale de l'Automobile (FIA) safety standards.

Most suits use fabric made of Nomex, a synthetic material produced by DuPont that retains its fire-retardant properties with time and use. Other suits consist of cotton treated with Proban, a chemical manufactured by Rhodia, or other substances. These suits can lose their fire-resistant properties over time, particularly after washing. Other suits are made of Kevlar, polybenzimidazole fiber (PBI), or carbon fibers, but are less widely used due to lack of comfort and color variety. Newer suits, such as those produced by Sparco, have inner liners treated with menthol to create a cooling sensation and fight odor. Additional accessories, including fire-resistant long underwear, gloves, shoes, and balaclava-like face masks or "head socks" are also worn.

When Nomex material is exposed to flame, instead of burning or melting it develops a carbon char. The char thickens the section of fiber exposed to the flame, preventing the spread of the fire to the rest of the suit and inhibiting the transfer of heat to the wearer of the garment. CarbonX is a different fabric for fire suits made of oxidized polyacrylonitrile (a precursor to carbon fiber). It is created by heating material until it oxidizes and chars, with the finished product able to last for two minutes exposed to fire. It is frequently used for racing undergarments and gloves. Using multiple layers of the material, and quilting of the fabric, meanwhile, create pockets of air which further insulate the wearer from heat.

The suits are not entirely fireproof, but rather fire retardant for a period of time, allowing an individual to escape an incident or be rescued with minimal injury. Bill Simpson, an innovator in racing safety, estimated in 1993 that a person has "20 to 30 seconds" before a fire suit begins to burn. The mandated minimum level of protection for uniforms in different racing series varies, as does the minimum standard for drivers, crew members, and officials. In the NHRA drag racing series, for example, suits are designed to last 30 to 40 seconds before the wearer suffers second degree burns. This is a higher benchmark than that of most other series, due to the high risk of fire from nitromethane and alcohol-fueled cars. SFI Foundation, Inc., formerly part of SEMA, dictates the suit fire protection standards for numerous sanctioning bodies particularly in the United States, including NASCAR, IndyCar, the NHRA, the Sports Car Club of America (SCCA), and the United States Auto Club (USAC). The FIA determines the standards for most of its series such as Formula One and the FIA World Endurance Championship, excluding the standards of its drag racing competition which are determined by SFI. SFI and FIA standards are used by other organizations outside their jurisdiction, such as the Confederation of Australian Motor Sport (CAMS).

Both SFI and the FIA use the Thermal Protective Performance (TPP) test to measure the effectiveness of fire-retardant clothing. This test, created by DuPont in the 1970s, measures the amount of time in seconds before the wearer of a garment suffers second degree burns. For example, a garment that lasts three seconds before second degree burns occur receives a TPP value of 6. Under SFI standards, this would receive a rating of 3.2A/1, the lowest possible SFI rating.

=== Non-fire retardant suits ===
Suits in several other classes of racing are similar in appearance to fire suits, but are not designed to be fire resistant. Suits used for kart racing are not typically fire retardant, but rather are made to be abrasion resistant using leather, nylon or cordura. Suits used for motorcycle racing, called motorcycle leathers, are also designed to be abrasion resistant. They consist of leather or a similarly strong material, with nylon and spandex fabrics prohibited. Fire-resistant undergarments are optional to provide fire protection. The Commission Internationale de Karting (CIK) and FIA regulate specifications for karting suits. The Fédération Internationale de Motocyclisme (FIM) regulates suits for numerous racing series such as MotoGP and the AMA Supercross Championship.

=== Branding ===
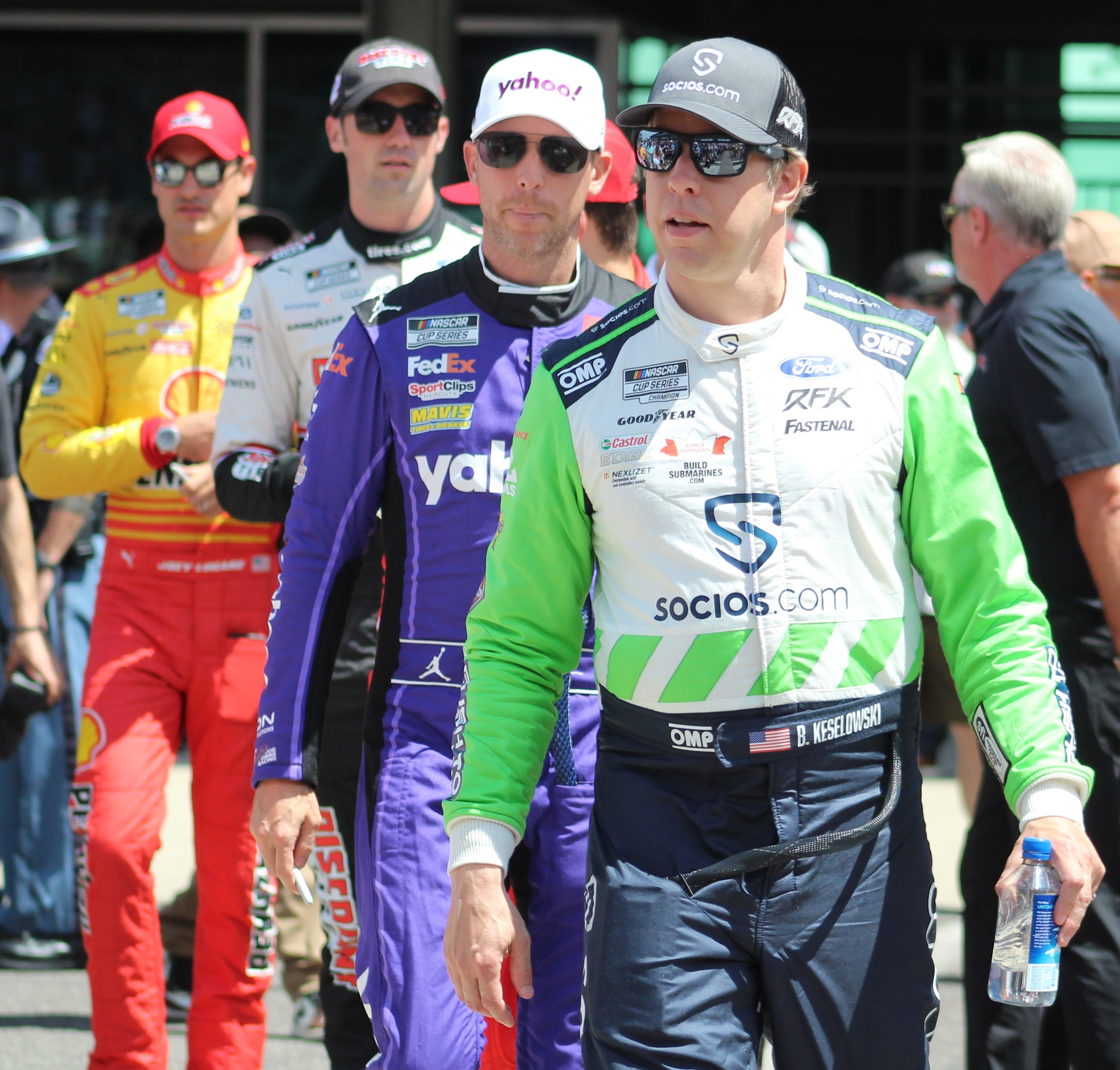
NASCAR drivers Joey Logano, Austin Cindric, Denny Hamlin, and Brad Keselowski in their firesuits.

Since the 1980s, racing suits have been customized to prominently feature the sponsors of drivers and teams, leading to designs similar to those of the race cars. For fire suits, the material used to make the sponsor patches must also be fire proof, adding additional weight to the suit. Many modern suits, however, use printed logos in order to reduce weight.

== History ==
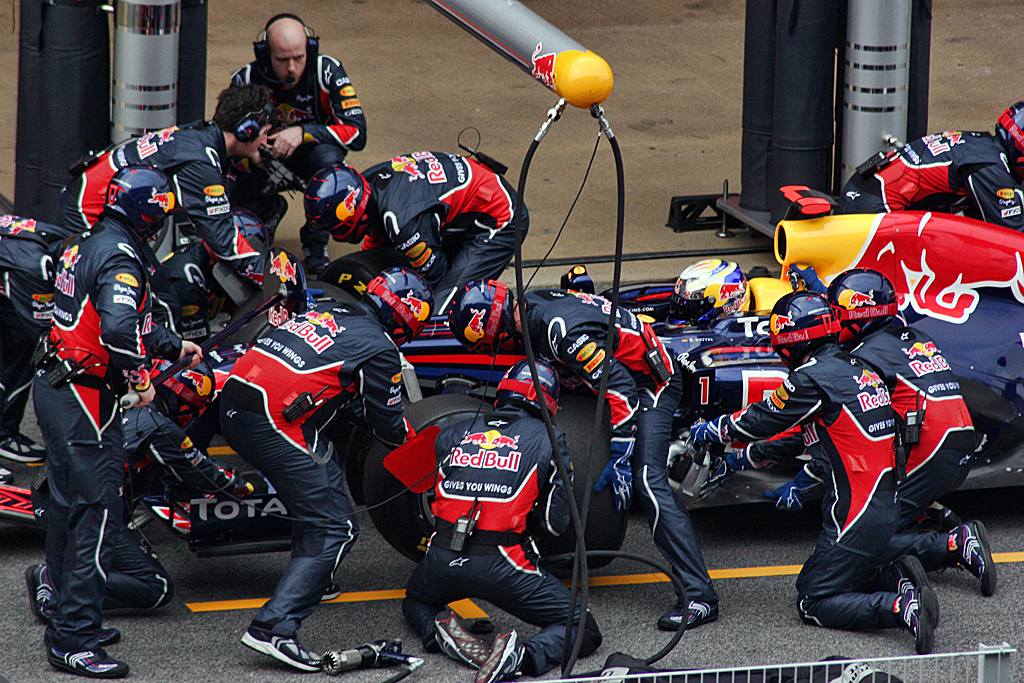
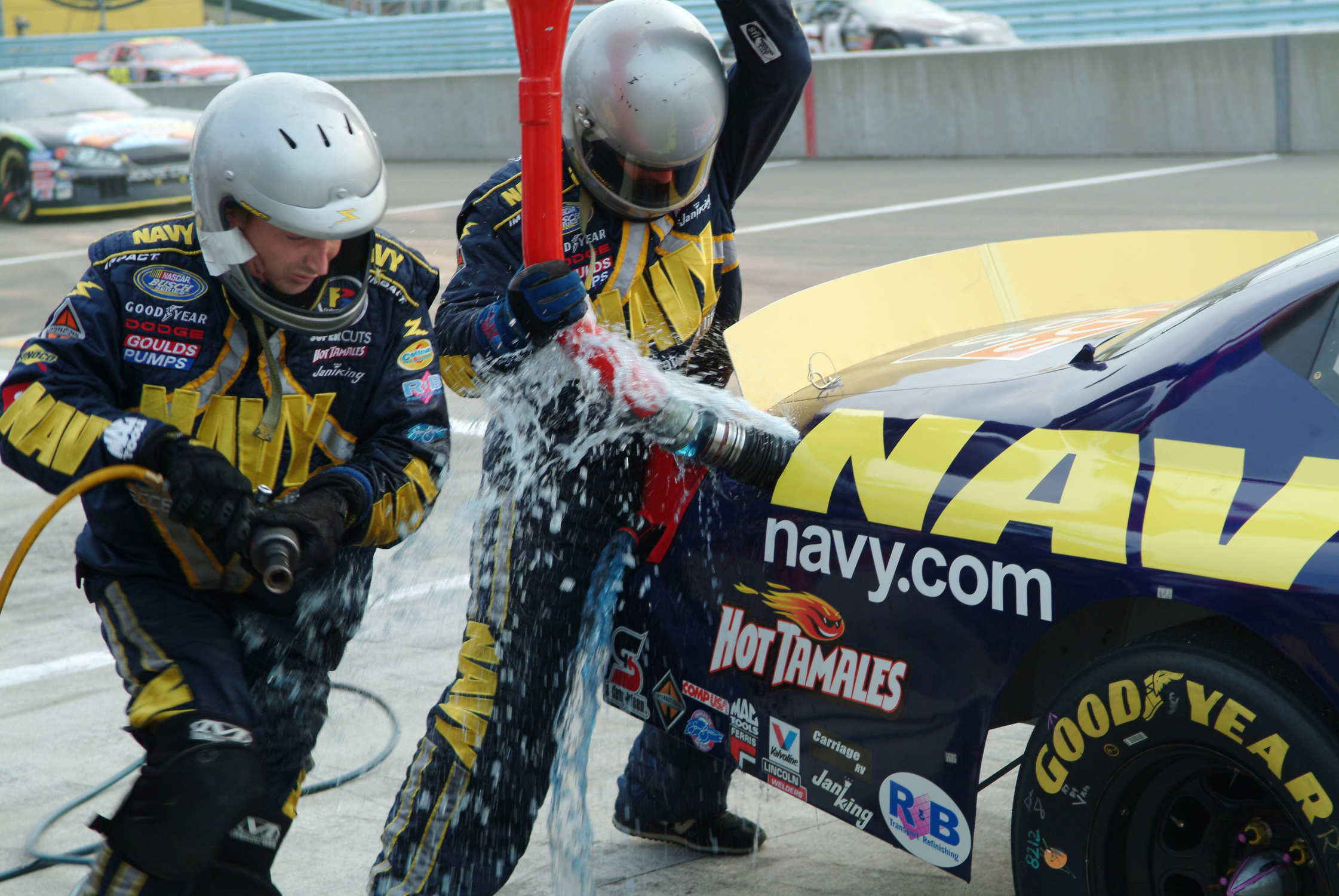
Formula One mechanics (top) and a NASCAR pit crew (bottom) perform pit stops in fire-retardant suits.

Prior to the advent of fire-retardant racing suits, there were no mandated driving uniforms in most racing series. In NASCAR competition, for example, many drivers and crew members would wear jeans and other typical street clothes. American firm Hinchman had manufactured specialized racing suits since the mid-1920s, worn by drivers Babe Stapp and Pete DePaolo. In the 1950s, NASCAR Grand National (NASCAR Cup Series) driver Tim Flock began wearing a specialized racing suit, which became popular in the 1960s. At this time, the suits were designed with an inner liner meant to keep drivers cool. Soon afterwards, in several series racing suits or any driver clothing used in competition were soaked in chemical solutions to make them fire-retardant long enough for a driver to escape an incident. In NASCAR, a baking soda solution was typically used, while the SCCA mandated racing suits treated in boric acid or borax. Boraxo, a brand of powdered soap largely composed of borax, was often used as treatment.

The catalyst for developing racing suits that could effectively resist fire came in the late 1950s and 1960s, when several fiery crashes occurred in the motorsport world. In 1959, Jerry Unser died from burns suffered in a crash practicing for the Indianapolis 500. In 1963, NHRA Top Fuel driver and Division 7 Tech Director Chuck Branham died after suffering burns in a crash. During NASCAR's 1964 World 600 (today's Coca-Cola 600), Fireball Roberts was involved in a crash on lap seven while avoiding two other cars, dying five weeks later. Roberts had asthmatic reactions to the clothing treatment used by NASCAR, and had received a waiver against using it. One week later during the 1964 Indianapolis 500, drivers Dave MacDonald and Eddie Sachs were killed in a seven-car crash on the second lap of the race.

Following the incidents, Jim Deist and Bill Simpson, who developed some of the first drag parachutes, released the first racing suits designed to be fire-retardant. Both suits were "aluminized" in order to be flame resistant. Simpson's suit consisted of a modified cotton boilersuit. In 1959 after the death of Unser, all Indy 500 competitors were required to wear fire-retardant clothing. In 1963, the FIA assumed responsibility for driver safety in its series, and mandated fire-retardant suits for Formula One drivers. In 1964, the NHRA mandated fire suits for its competitors. By the fall of that year after Roberts' crash, nearly all NASCAR competitors began wearing fire suits, although no official rule was in place.

In 1966, Simpson met NASA astronaut Pete Conrad, who introduced Simpson to the Nomex material used in spacesuits for the Apollo program. Around the same time, DuPont also approached the Hinchman company about producing Nomex racing suits. In that year's Indianapolis 500, driver Mel Kenyon wore a Nomex fire suit produced by Hinchman. Later that year, several drivers began testing experimental Nomex suits for Simpson, including F1 drivers Walt Hansgen and Masten Gregory, NASCAR driver Marvin Panch, and SCCA Trans-Am Series driver Bob Tullius. Simpson's company Simpson Performance Products released the first commercial Nomex racing suit, called the "Heat Shield Firesuit", in 1967. The suits were worn by 30 of 33 competitors in the 1967 Indianapolis 500.

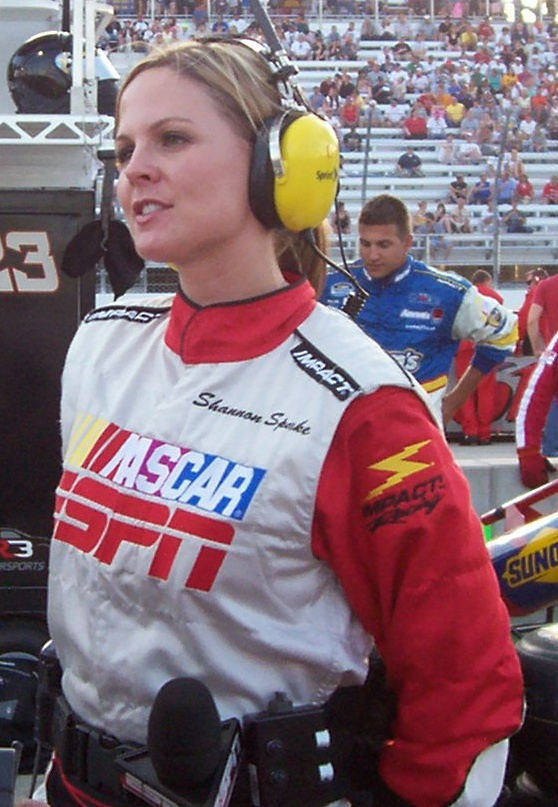
ESPN reporter Shannon Spake wearing a fire suit in 2009

By 1970, the NHRA along with SEMA began developing specifications for fire suits, using the Thermal Protective Performance (TPP) standard developed by DuPont. These specifications are now used by SFI. During the 1970s, racewear manufacturer Stand 21 partnered with Leconte, French producer of firemen's suits to create single-layer racing uniforms. Actor Steve McQueen was believed to have worn asbestos suits when performing stunts for films, which may have contributed to his contraction of mesothelioma. In 1975, the FIA introduced its current standard for fire-retardant suits. At this time, DuPont created a new Nomex blend using Kevlar to prevent tearing and increase the longevity of suits. In 1979, several F1 drivers including Niki Lauda, Mario Andretti, and Carlos Reutemann began competing in bulky five-layer suits constructed to NASA specifications.

In the mid-1980s, companies began designing fire suits to prominently display team sponsors. In 1986, the FIA introduced new specifications for fire suits, known as "FIA 1986" certification. At the 1989 Motorcraft Quality Parts 500 NASCAR event, ESPN/ABC broadcaster Dr. Jerry Punch was reporting from the pit stall of Richard Petty when a fire broke out, injuring two crew members who Punch proceeded to treat on the spot. Following the incident, in which several items of Punch's clothing were singed or melted, ESPN mandated that its pit reporters wear fire-retardant suits. Other networks have since adopted the practice.

In 1994, the FIA mandated fire suits for F1 pit crew members, coinciding with refueling being allowed (until 2009) during pit stops. By this time, crews in IndyCar were also required to wear fire suits. In 2002, NASCAR officially mandated fire suits for both drivers and crew members servicing the car during pit stops. This was in response to non-fire-related incidents in the previous season, including the death of Dale Earnhardt at the beginning of 2001, and a pit road accident at the Pennzoil Freedom 400 near the end of the season. NASCAR was one of the last major sanctioning bodies to mandate fire suits for crew members.

=== In other media ===
The members of the Red Star crew in the 2000 film Charlie's Angels wore black Momo Corse Torino firesuits. The racing suits in Charlie's Angels were designed by Joseph G. Aulisi.

== List of racing suit manufacturers ==
- Adidas
- Alpinestars
- Stand 21
- FervoGear
- Impact! Racing
- Dainese
- Oakley, Inc.
- Moto Speeds
- OMP Racing
- Puma SE
- Sabelt
- Simpson Performance Products
- Sparco
- K1 RaceGear
- Racechick

== See also ==
- Safety in NASCAR
- Racing helmet
