= SF1 =

SF1 may refer to:

== Biochemistry ==
- Helicase superfamily 1, a common protein.
- Splicing factor 1, a protein encoded by the gene SF1
- Steroidogenic factor 1, a protein encoded by the gene NR5A1

== Videogaming ==
- Star Fox (1993 video game), the first game in the Star Fox series
- Street Fighter (video game), the first game in the Street Fighter series
- SF-1 SNES TV, a television monitor sold by Sharp Corporation with a built-in Super NES

== Other uses ==
- SRF 1, a Swiss television channel formerly known as 'SF 1'
- Summary File 1, a United States Census report

== See also ==
- SF (disambiguation)
- SFI (disambiguation)
- SFL (disambiguation) (sfl)
