= Bill Simpson (racing driver) =

American racing driver (1940–2019)

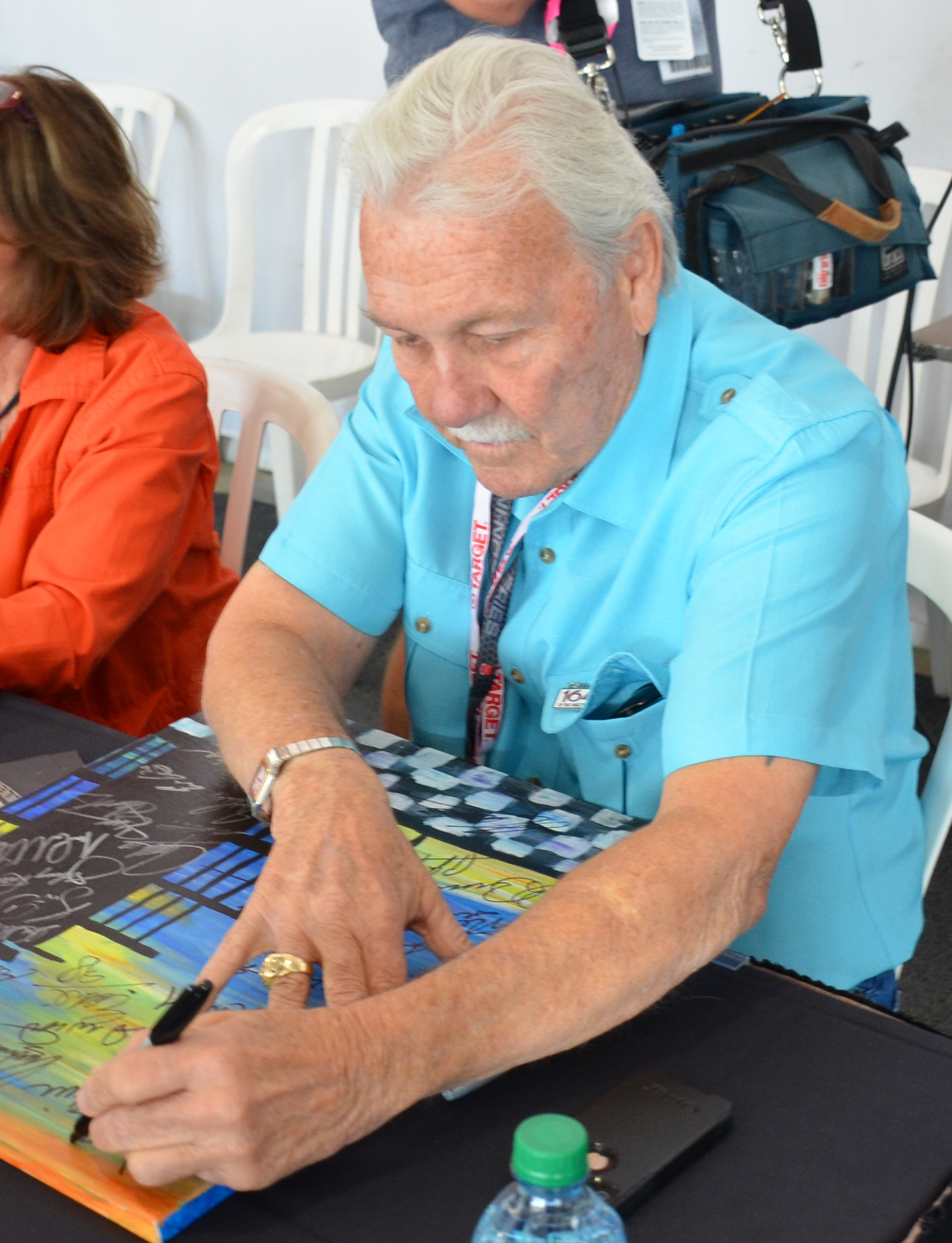
- Simpson in 2015
- Born: Elwood Jesse Simpson; March 14, 1940 Hermosa Beach, California, U.S.
- Died: December 16, 2019 (aged 79) Indianapolis, Indiana, U.S.

Elwood Jesse "Bill" Simpson (March 14, 1940 – December 16, 2019) was an American racing driver, best known as a pioneer in the racing safety business with his company Simpson Performance Products. Later during his business career, he branched into developing equipment for football safety.

== Racing career ==
Simpson started in drag racing and SCCA Formula racing, eventually moving up to the USAC Championship Car series. He raced in the 1968–1974 and 1976–1977 seasons, with 52 career starts. He qualified twentieth for the 1974 Indianapolis 500, and finished thirteenth. He finished in the top-ten 11 times, with his best finish in sixth position in 1970 at Milwaukee. He decided to end his racing career in 1977, because he started to think about a telephone call that he needed to make while he was practicing at Indianapolis Motor Speedway.

== Race safety advocate ==
In 1958, the 18-year-old Simpson broke both arms in a drag racing crash. Simpson later said, "Until then, I was like most drivers. The only time I thought about safety was after I'd been hurt. This time, I was hurt bad enough to do a lot of thinking."

Simpson's uncle owned a military surplus store, and suggested that he use a cross-form parachute to slow down the drag car. Simpson rented a sewing machine to create a prototype. Simpson got together with his friend dragster driver Mike Sorokin to test the prototype. They tested it by attaching it to a tow hitch, and dumping it from the back of the Chevy wagon while Sorokin drove down a street at 100 mph. The chute was too big for the car, and the car went airborne and crashed into a tree nursery. Both racers were jailed for the incident, but Simpson Drag Chutes was founded.

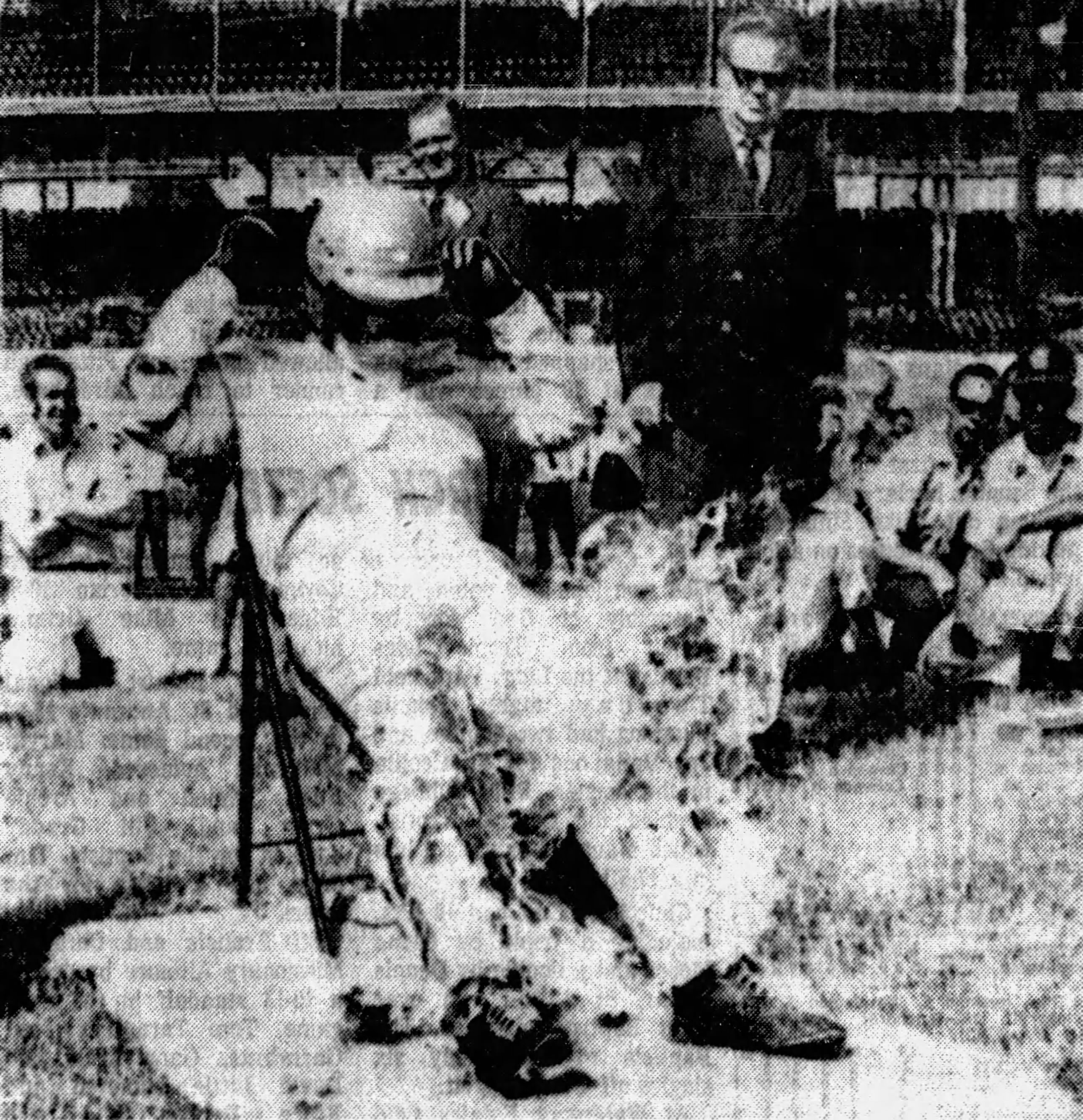
Simpson tests a fire suit in 1970

The first person to inquire about and use his parachute was "Big Daddy" Don Garlits. He evolved his business into a number of other safety items, such as gloves, helmets, restraints, and shoes. Simpson designed NASA's first umbilical cords, where he met Pete Conrad. Conrad introduced Simpson to a DuPont product, Nomex, in 1967. Simpson used the product to create the first fire suit to be used in racing. He took the suit to the 1967 Indianapolis 500 where it was worn by 30 of 33 drivers. Simpson had developed over 200 racing safety products, including three generations of fire suits. Simpson has at several times demonstrated the suit's effectiveness, by being set on fire while wearing a suit.

=== Earnhardt controversy ===
Simpson Performance Products was involved in a controversy after the February 2001 death of Dale Earnhardt over whether the seat belt manufactured by the company had malfunctioned. NASCAR's initial investigation into the crash in part blamed seat belt failure; eventually the series moved to institute long called for safety standards, such as mandated use of the HANS device.

Simpson received death threats and bullets into his house, which led to his resignation in July 2001. Simpson sued NASCAR for $8.5 million defamation of character suit in February 2003, later withdrawing it after receiving an undisclosed settlement.

=== Later career ===
After leaving Simpson Performance Products, Bill Simpson realized that he still had much to contribute to improving driver safety. After a one-year non-compete with Simpson Performance Products expired, he started Impact! Racing in 2002. In addition to the drag chutes and Nomex underwear that Bill Simpson first introduced to racing, Impact! began to manufacture restraints, helmets, race suits, shoes, and gloves for Formula One, NHRA, NASCAR, IndyCar, and other racing applications. In 2010, Simpson sold Impact! Racing to Robbie Pierce and MasterCraft Safety.

== Football helmets ==
Simpson designed a lighter football helmet after attending an Indianapolis Colts football game and witnessing a player being hit in the head by the ball. He partnered with Chip Ganassi to form Simpson Ganassi Helmets. While their safety-related products and efforts to enhance safety-related procedures were welcomed by teams at local levels, they were resisted by the NFL. Simpson and Ganassi sold the company in 2018.

== Death ==
Simpson died of complications from a stroke, in Indianapolis, on December 16, 2019.

== Awards and honors ==
- Motorsports Hall of Fame of America (2003)
- Auto Racing Hall of Fame (2014)

== Racing results ==
=== USAC Championship Car series ===
(key) (Races in bold indicate pole position)

Year	Team	1	2	3	4	5	6	7	8	9	10	11	12	13	14	15	16	17	18	19	20	21	22	23	24	25	26	27	28	Rank	Points
1968	Bill Simpson	HAN	LVG	PHX	TRE	INDY	MIL	MOS	MOS	LAN	PIP	CDR	NAZ	IRP	IRP	LAN	LAN	MTR	MTR	SPR	MIL	DUQ	ISF	TRE	SAC	MCH	HAN	PHX	RIV; 27	NC	0
1969	Bill Simpson	PHX; DNQ	HAN; 11	INDY	MIL; DNQ	LAN	PIP	CDR; 13	NAZ	TRE	IRP; 12	IRP; 8	MIL; 21	SPR	DOV; DNQ	DUQ	ISF	BRN; 12	BRN; 7	TRE	SAC	KEN; DNQ	KEN	PHX; 15	RIV; 8					30th	320
1970	Bill Simpson	PHX; 22	SON; 10	TRE; 19	INDY	MIL; 20	LAN; 19	CDR; 14	MCH	IRP; 7	SPR	MIL; 6	ONT; DNQ	DUQ	ISF	SED	TRE; 19	SAC	PHX; 21											33rd	295
1971	Bill Simpson	RAF; 17	RAF; 13	PHX; 23	TRE	INDY; DNQ	MIL; 19	POC; 18	MCH; DNQ	MIL	ONT; DNQ	TRE; 28	PHX; 12																	42nd	15
1972	Bill Simpson	PHX; 24	TRE	INDY; DNQ	MIL	MCH; 13	POC; 24	MIL; 24	ONT; 9	TRE	PHX; 17																			27th	200
1973	Joe Hunt	TWS	TRE	TRE	INDY; DNQ	MIL	POC	MCH	MIL	ONT	ONT; 14	ONT	MCH	MCH	TRE	TWS; 26	PHX													NC	0
1974	Bill Simpson	ONT	ONT; 14	ONT; 14	PHX	TRE																								32nd	105
1974	American Kids Racers						INDY; 13	MIL; 8	POC; 18	MCH	MIL; 19	MCH	TRE	TRE																32nd	105
1974	Rolla Vollstedt														PHX; 11															32nd	105
1975	Bill Simpson	ONT	ONT	ONT	PHX	TRE	INDY; DNQ	MIL	POC	MCH	MIL	MCH	TRE	PHX																–	–
1976	Bill Simpson	PHX	TRE	INDY; DNQ	MIL; 8	POC; 23	MCH; 8	TWS; 12	TRE; 14	MIL	ONT; 14	MCH; 15	TWS; 20	PHX; DNQ																28th	190
1977	Theodore Racing	ONT; 9	PHX; 22	TWS	TRE	INDY	MIL	POC	MOS	MCH	TWS	MIL	ONT	MCH	TRE	PHX														34th	80

== Bibliography ==
- Simpson, Bill; Bourcier, Bones (2000). Racing Safely, Living Dangerously: The Hard Life and Fast Times of a Motorsports Mogul. ISBN 978-0-892725182.
- Simpson, Bill (2017). Through the Fire. Speedway Motors.
