= Simpson Performance Products =

American motorsports parts supplier

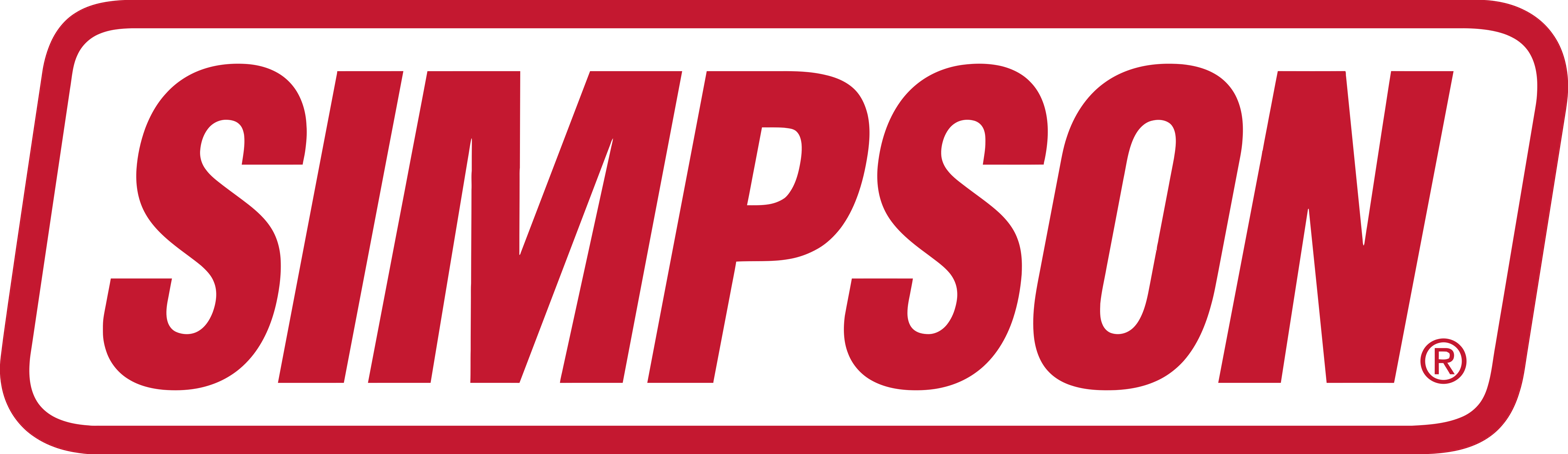

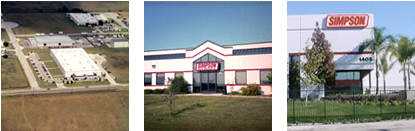
- Simpson's manufacturing facility in New Braunfels, TX, 2014
- Type: Private
- Industry: Automotive
- Founded: 1958; 68 years ago
- Founder: Bill Simpson
- Headquarters: New Braunfels, U.S.
- Products: Racing and motorcycle helmets, racing suits, gloves, shoes
- Website: simpsonraceproducts.com

Simpson Performance Products is an American motorsports parts supplier that manufactures safety products such as gloves, helmets, harness systems, driver's suits, head restraints, and shoes. It is marketed to racers ranging from participants at local track days to international Formula One and NASCAR teams. It was started by Bill Simpson as Simpson Drag Chutes.

== History ==
In 1958, the 18-year-old Simpson broke both arms in a drag racing crash. Simpson said later, "Until then, I was like most drivers. The only time I thought about safety was after I'd been hurt. This time, I was hurt bad enough to do a lot of thinking."

Simpson's uncle owned a military surplus store, and suggested that he use a cross-form parachute to slow down the drag car. Simpson rented a sewing machine to create a prototype. Simpson got together with his friend dragster driver Mike Sorokin to test the prototype. They tested it by attaching it to a tow hitch, and dumping it from the back of the Chevy wagon while Sorokin drove down a street at 100 mph. The chute was too big for the car, and the car went airborne and crashed into a tree nursery. Both racers were jailed for the incident, but Simpson Drag Chutes was founded.

The first person to inquire about and use his parachute was "Big Daddy" Don Garlits. He evolved his business into a number of other safety items, such as gloves, helmets, restraints, and shoes. Simpson designed NASA's first umbilical cords, where he met Pete Conrad. Conrad introduced Simpson to DuPont product Nomex in 1967. Simpson used the product to create the first fire suit to be used in racing. He took the suit to the 1967 Indianapolis 500 where it was worn by 30 of 33 drivers. Simpson had developed over 200 racing safety products, including three generations of fire suits. Simpson demonstrated the suit's effectiveness in 1987, when he was set on fire while wearing a suit.

== Usage ==
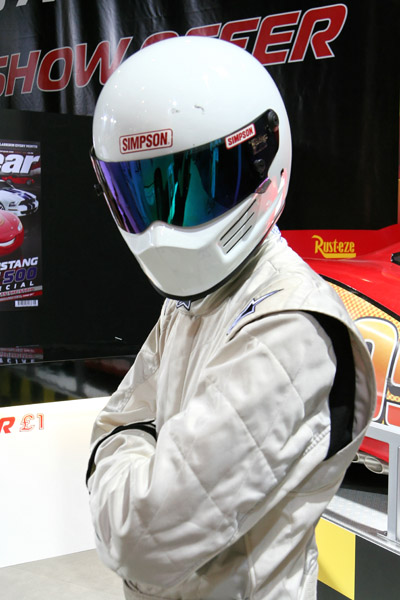
A Simpson helmet, worn by "The Stig"

Simpson Performance Products racing safety products have been used in many motorsport disciplines, including IndyCars, NASCAR, and National Hot Rod Association. All International Race of Champions (IROC) cars were fitted with Simpson belts and window nets until the sanctioning body closed. Until 2006, Simpson Performance Products was the only company to supply all of the safety items used in NASCAR racing. The modern Simpson Performance Products has grown to include a comprehensive line of racing safety products and manufactures some of their products in Texas, North Carolina, and California, while other products are manufactured overseas. Simpson has 5 locations which include Indiana, North Carolina, Texas, and California. The company was founded in 1959 by Bill Simpson. A line of Simpson helmets, nicknamed the "Star Wars" helmet has been in production since 1979. The original model was named the RX-1 (RXM-1 for motorcycle use), then renamed the Model 30 shortly thereafter. The basic design was revised with fewer air slots and renamed the "Bandit." A number of different Bandit versions have followed.

The current Bandit helmet lineup from Simpson includes a Carbon Fiber Bandit, introduced in 2012. The X-Bandit Pro is a full carbon Super Helmet, Snell 2010, and FIA 8860 approved. Simpson’s U.S. manufacturing facility is located New Braunfels, Texas. The similarly designed "Diamondback" is notably worn by The Stig from the BBC TV Top Gear series.

== Simpson today ==
Simpson Performance Products is headquartered in New Braunfels, Texas. Much of the company's harness systems, HANS head restraints, flagship parachutes are manufactured and tested at the site. Simpson firesuits and crew uniforms are manufactured outside of Los Angeles, CA in their 52,000 sq. foot facility. Simpson also has a factory in Pedrengo (Italy) where helmets are manufactured. Simpson also employs a customer service and sales team based in Mooresville, North Carolina.
