= Sparco =

Italian maker of automotive safety clothing and equipment

Sparco S.p.A.
- Type: S.p.A.
- Industry: Automotive
- Founded: 1977; 49 years ago
- Founders: Enrico Glorioso; Antonio Parisi
- Headquarters: Volpiano, Metropolitan City of Turin, Italy
- Products: Steering wheels, car seats, racing helmets, racing suits, gloves, shoes, t-shirts
- Website: sparco-official.com

Sparco S.p.A. is an Italian auto part and accessory company headquartered in Volpiano near Turin that specializes in producing items such as seats, steering wheels, harnesses, racewear and helmets. Sparco branded alloy wheels are produced under licence by OZ Group. They also sponsor many types of auto races including rallies and single-seaters. The manufacturer also makes racing gear; with gloves, simulation cockpits, performance apparel, gaming chairs, pedals, and shift knobs.

== History ==
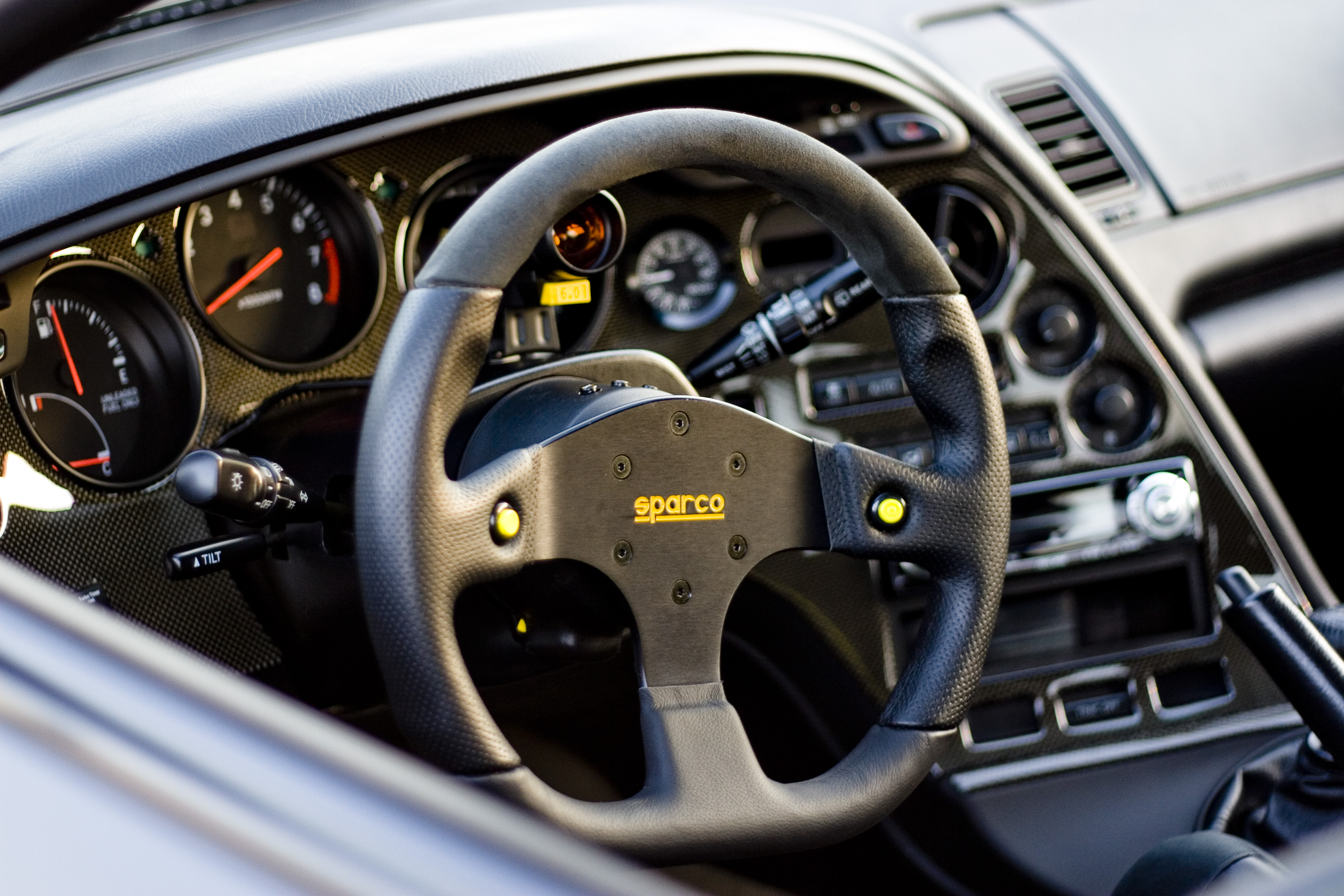
Sparco steering wheel in an A80 Toyota Supra

The company was founded in 1977 in Italy and today, the ownership is still Italian; the company is one of the leading manufacturers of racing safety equipment.

In 1977, the FIA (Fédération Internationale de I'Automobile) decided to restrict their safety standards, in order to decrease injuries during races: the first product that brought notability to Sparco, was a fireproof racing suit, that could withstand 11 seconds in fire, a record for the time. This resistance was more than enough to meet new FIA 8856-2000 requests. Moreover, that was the only effective alternative to the cotton racing suits, which were not fireproof and did not meet the new requirements. Each year Sparco improved their technology, so the fire resistance of their suits increased yearly.

In 2009, Aldino Bellazzini acquired a majority stake in Sparco and assumed the role of Chairman. Following his appointment, Bellazzini initiated a series of technical improvements within the company. These enhancements contributed to Sparco obtaining the ISO/TS16949:09 quality certification in 2010.

Sparco, in collaboration with McLaren, developed the McLaren SP16+, a race suit that is at least 10 percent lighter than any other on the market. Since 2016, this suit has been worn by drivers of the McLaren F1 Racing Team.

== Sponsorships ==
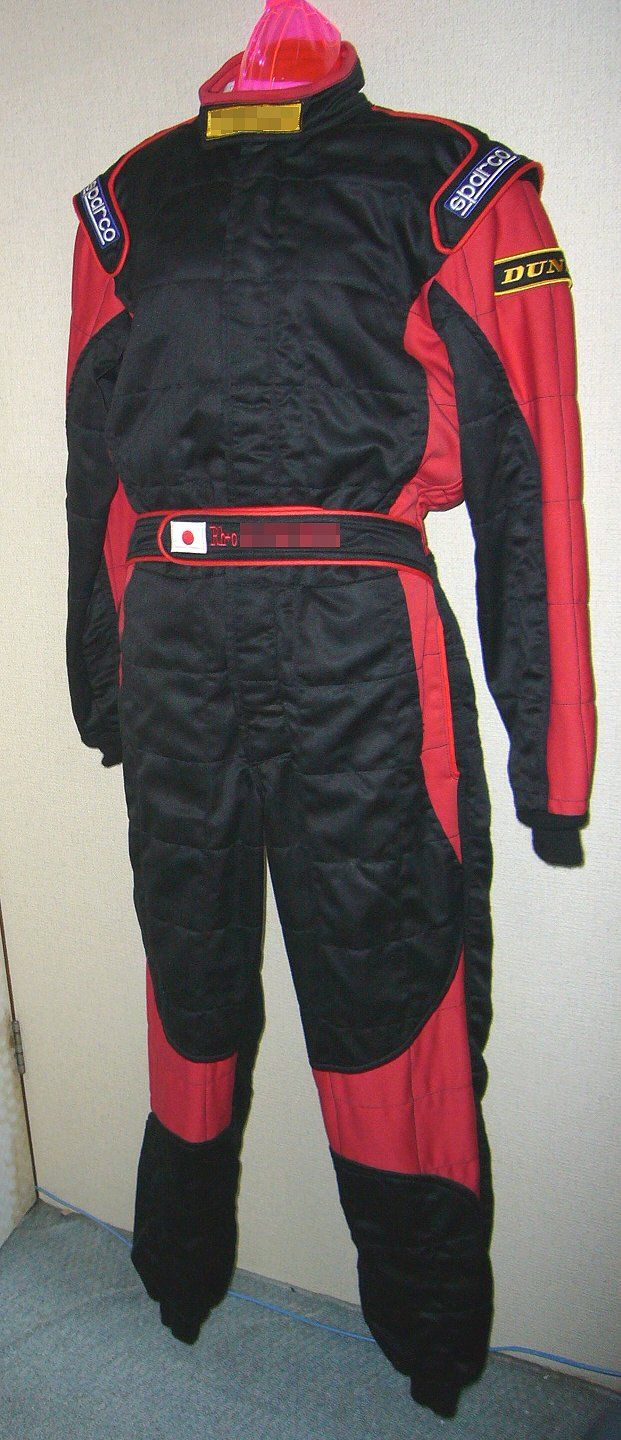
Sparco racing suit

=== Formula One ===
- (Austria) Red Bull Racing
- (United Kingdom) Williams F1 Team

=== Formula 2 ===
- (Spain) Campos Racing
- (Italy) Trident Motorsport

=== IndyCar ===
- (United States) Chip Ganassi Racing
- (United States) Rahal Letterman Lanigan Racing
- (United States) Andretti Global
- (United States) Dreyer & Reinbold Racing

=== NASCAR ===
- (United States) Kaulig Racing
- (United States) Rick Ware Racing
- (United States) Richard Childress Racing
- (United States) Front Row Motorsports

=== Former sponsorships ===
==== Formula One ====
- (United Kingdom) Arrows
- (Switzerland) Alfa Romeo Racing
- (United Kingdom) (Italy) Benetton Formula
- (Italy) Ferrari
- (Italy) Forti
- (Republic of Ireland) Jordan Grand Prix
- (United Kingdom) MasterCard Lola
- (United Kingdom) McLaren
- (Russia) Midland F1 Racing
- (Italy) Minardi
- (France) Prost Grand Prix
- (Japan) Super Aguri F1
- (Netherlands) Spyker F1
- (Malaysia) Team Lotus (2010–11)/Caterham F1 Team
- (Japan) Toyota Racing
- (United Kingdom) (Russia) Virgin Racing
- (United Kingdom) Williams

== See also ==
- List of companies of Italy
