= Granulosa cell tumour =

- Other names: Granulosa-theca cell tumours or Folliculoma
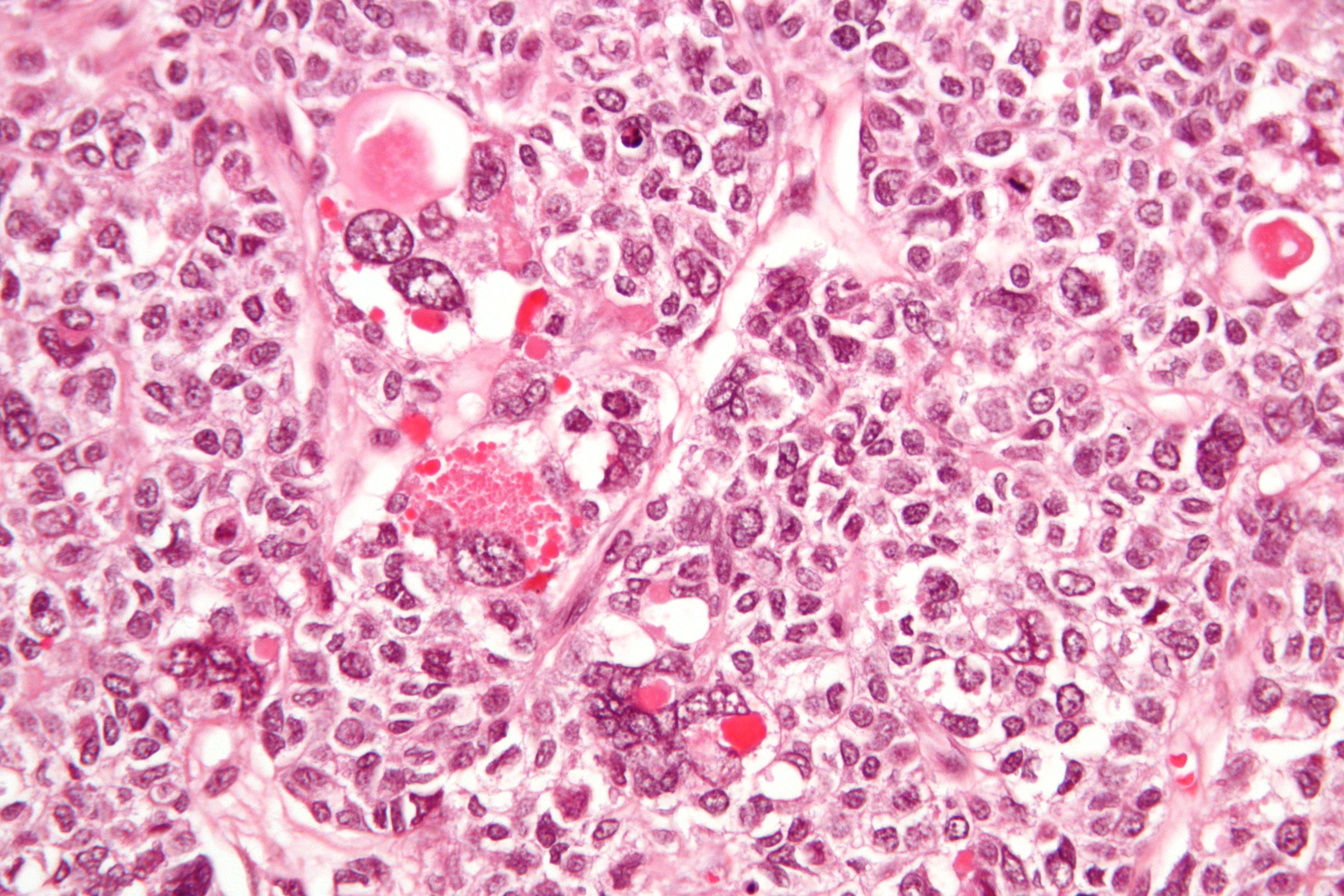
- Micrograph of a juvenile granulosa cell tumour with hyaline globules. H&E stain.
- Specialty: Gynecologic oncology, obstetrics and gynaecology, oncology, endocrinology

Granulosa cell tumours are tumours that arise from granulosa cells in the ovaries and testicles. They are estrogen-secreting tumours and present as large, complex, masses in affected glands. These tumours are part of the sex cord–gonadal stromal tumour or non-epithelial group of tumours. Although granulosa cells normally occur only in the ovary, granulosa cell tumours occur both in ovaries and testes (see ovarian cancer and testicular cancer). These tumours generally should be considered malignant and treated in the same way as other malignant tumours. Ovarian granulosa cell tumours have two forms, juvenile and adult, both of which are usually characterized by indolent growth, and therefore have high recovery rates. The staging system for these tumours is the same as for epithelial tumours, and most present as stage I. The peak age at which they occur is 50–55 years, but they may occur at any age.

Juvenile granulosa cell tumours are a similar but histologically and genetically distinct rare tumour. They also occur both in the ovary and testis. In the testis they are extremely rare, and have not been reported to be malignant. Although juvenile granulosa cell tumours usually occur in children (hence the name), they have been reported also in adults.

== Presentation ==
Estrogens are produced by functioning tumours, and the clinical presentation depends on the patient's age and sex.

- Female
  - If the patient is postmenopausal, she usually presents with abnormal uterine bleeding and in some cases hemoperitoneum.
  - If the patient is of reproductive age, she would present with menometrorrhagia. However, in some cases she may stop ovulating altogether.
  - If the patient has not reached puberty, early onset of puberty may be seen.
  - these tumours tend to have late recurrences (even after 30 years)

== Genetics ==
=== Adult granulosa cell tumours ===
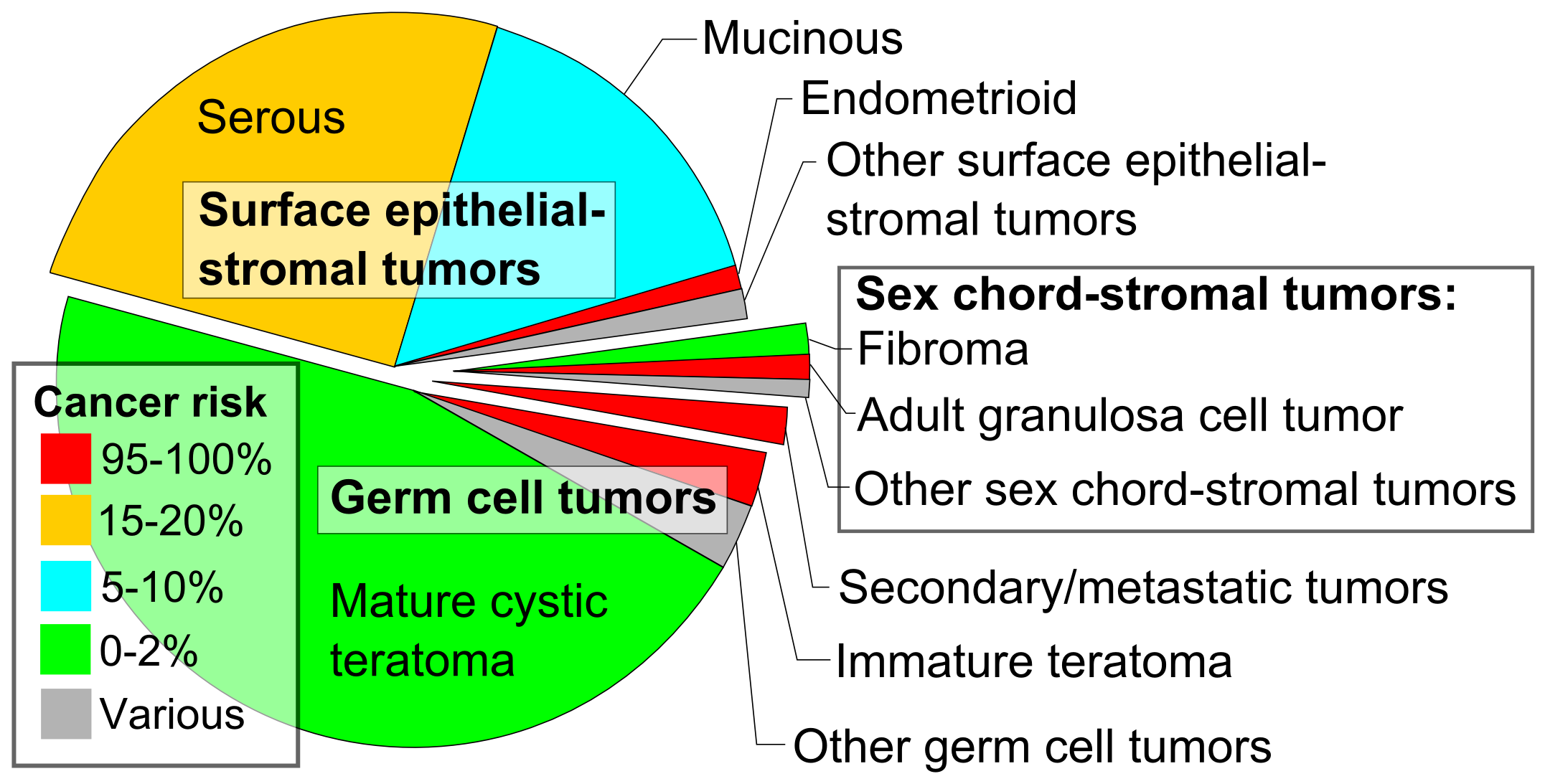
Ovarian tumours by incidence and risk of ovarian cancer, with adult granulosa cell tumour at right

Using next generation DNA sequencing, 97% of adult granulosa cell tumours were found to contain an identical mutation in the FOXL2 gene, which is an important regulator of the development of granulosa-cells . Mutation c.402C>G in the sequence of the FOXL2 gene leads to the amino acid substitution p. C134W. Because this is a somatic mutation, it is not usually transmitted to descendants. This mutation was not common in juvenile granulosa cell tumors, supporting the conclusion that the adult and juvenile forms are separate diseases .

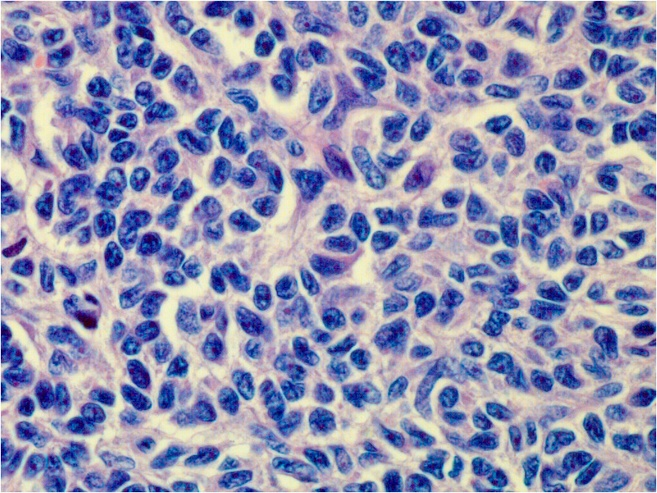
Histopathology of adult granulosa cell tumor, from a testis. It forms nest and cord composed of small cells with scant cytoplasm and typical grooved, coffee bean-like nuclei, resembling its ovarian counterpart. (H&E stain).

=== Juvenile granulosa cell tumours ===
Two recent studies show that the enzyme AKT1 is involved in juvenile granulosa cell tumours. In-frame duplications in the pleckstrin-homology domain of the protein were found in more than 60% of juvenile granulosa cell tumours occurring in girls under 15 years of age. The tumours without duplications carried point mutations affecting highly conserved residues. The mutated proteins carrying the duplications displayed a non-wild-type subcellular distribution, with a marked enrichment at the plasma membrane, leading to a strong activation of AKT1. Analysis by RNA-Seq pinpointed a series of differentially expressed genes that are involved in cytokine and hormone signaling and cell division-related processes. Further analyses pointed to a possible dedifferentiation process, and suggested that most of the transcriptomic dysregulations might be mediated by a limited set of transcription factors perturbed by AKT1 activation. These results incriminate somatic mutations of AKT1 as probable drivers of the pathogenesis of juvenile granulosa cell tumours.

== Diagnosis ==
=== Gross appearance ===
Tumours vary in size, from tiny spots to large masses, with an average of 10 cm in diameter. Tumours are oval and soft in consistency. In cut-sections, histology reveals reticular, trabecular areas with interstitial haemorrhage and Call–Exner bodies-small cyst like spaces interspersed within a Graafian follicle.

=== Tumour marker ===
Inhibin, a hormone, has been used as biomarker for granulosa cell tumours.

=== Histology ===
Juvenile granulosa cell tumors can be distinguished from adult granulosa cell tumors histologically by their abundant, eosinophilic cytoplasm; primitive, highly mitotic nuclei in polygonal cells; and disorganized follicles.

== Other animals ==
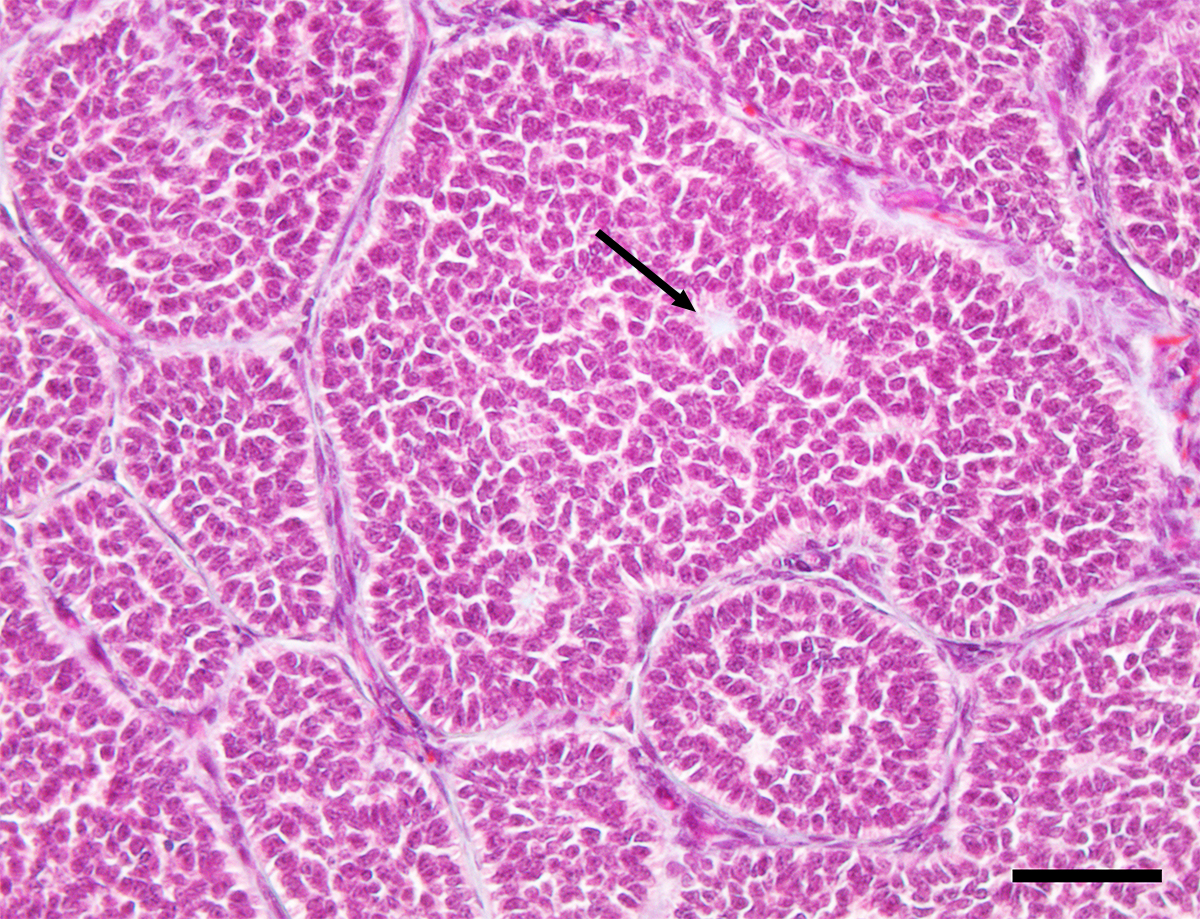
Clusters of granulosa cells in the ovary of an 18-year-old squirrel monkey; the arrow indicates a Call-Exner body, which is characteristic of granulosa cell tumours in humans. H&E stain; scale bar= 50 microns (0.05mm).

In the ovaries of aging squirrel monkeys (Saimiri sciureus), clusters of granulosa cells occur that closely resemble granulosa cell tumours in humans. These granulosa cell clusters are usually found in both ovaries and appear to be a normal change with age in this species.

== See also ==
- Inhibin, alpha
