= 2015 Axalta "We Paint Winners" 400 =

Race details
- Race 14 of 36 in the 2015 NASCAR Sprint Cup Series
- Date: June 7, 2015
- Location: Pocono Raceway in Long Pond, Pennsylvania
- Course: Permanent racing facility
- Course length: 2.5 miles (4 km)
- Distance: 160 laps, 400 mi (640 km)
- Weather: Clear blue skies with a temperature of 68 °F (20 °C); wind out of the southeast at 9 mph (14 km/h)
- Average speed: 134.266 mph (216.080 km/h)

Pole position
Driver	Kurt Busch	Stewart–Haas Racing
- Time: 50.676

Most laps led
Driver	Martin Truex Jr.	Furniture Row Racing
- Laps: 97

Winner
No. 78	Martin Truex Jr.	Furniture Row Racing

Television in the United States
- Network: Fox Sports 1
- Announcers: Mike Joy, Larry McReynolds and Darrell Waltrip
- Nielsen ratings: 2.3/4 (Overnight); 2.4/4 (Final); 3.6 Million viewers

Radio in the United States
- Radio: MRN
- Booth announcers: Joe Moore and Jeff Striegle
- Turn announcers: Dave Moody (1), Mike Bagley (2) and Kyle Rickey (3)

The 2015 Axalta "We Paint Winners" 400 was a NASCAR Sprint Cup Series race held on June 7, 2015, at Pocono Raceway in Long Pond, Pennsylvania. Contested over 160 laps on the 2.5 mile (4 km) triangular superspeedway, it was the 14th race of the 2015 NASCAR Sprint Cup Series season. Martin Truex Jr. won the race, while Kevin Harvick finished second, Jimmie Johnson finished third, Joey Logano and Kurt Busch rounded out the top five.

Kurt Busch won the pole for the race. He failed to lead a lap. Truex led the most laps for the fourth consecutive race in leading 97 laps. He took the lead with 36 laps to go and scored the victory. The race had twelve lead changes among six different drivers, as well as eight caution flag periods for 31 laps.

This was the third career win for Martin Truex Jr. and was a milestone win for MTJ as it kicked off the second half of his career, this was his first win since the 2013 Toyota/Save Mart 350 at Sonoma Raceway. It was the second win for Furniture Row Racing and first since the 2011 Showtime Southern 500 at Darlington Raceway. Despite the win, he left Pocono trailing Kevin Harvick by 39 points in the drivers standings. Chevrolet left with a 59-point lead over Ford in the manufacturer standings.

The Axalta "We Paint Winners" 400 was carried by Fox Sports on the cable/satellite Fox Sports 1 network for the American television audience. The radio broadcast for the race was carried by the Motor Racing Network and Sirius XM NASCAR Radio.

== Report ==
=== Background ===
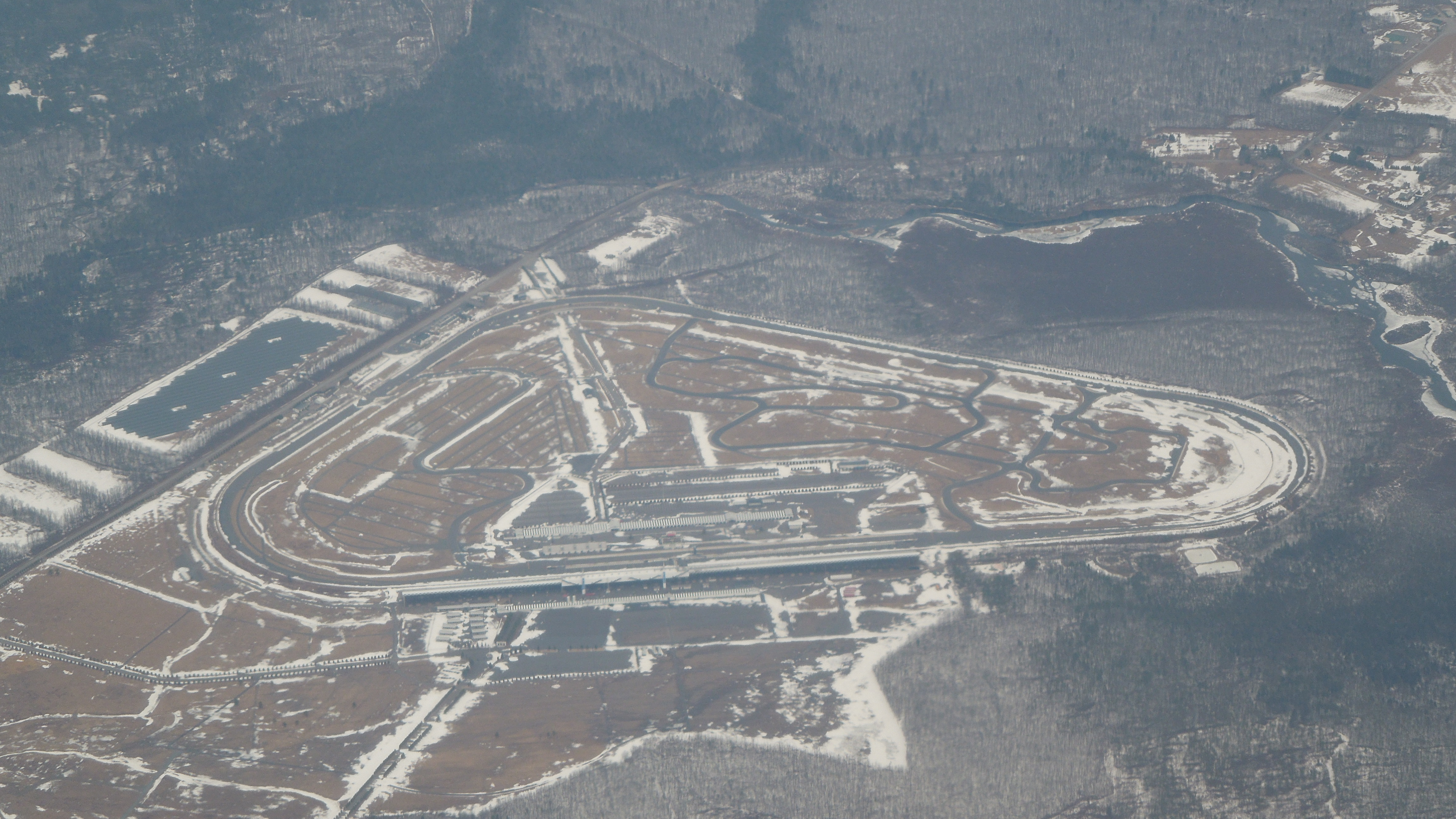
Pocono Raceway, the track where the race was held.

Pocono Raceway (formerly Pocono International Raceway) also known as the Tricky Triangle, is a superspeedway located in the Pocono Mountains of Pennsylvania at Long Pond. It is the site of two annual NASCAR Sprint Cup Series races held just weeks apart in June and August, and one NASCAR Camping World Truck Series event in August. Since 2013, the track is also host to a Verizon IndyCar Series race.

Pocono is one of a very few NASCAR tracks not owned by either Speedway Motorsports, Inc. or International Speedway Corporation, the dominant track owners in NASCAR. It is run by the Igdalsky siblings Brandon, Nicholas, and sister Ashley, and cousins Joseph IV and Chase Mattioli, all of whom are third-generation members of the family-owned Mattco Inc, started by Joseph II and Rose Mattioli. Mattco also owns South Boston Speedway in South Boston, Virginia.

Outside of the NASCAR races, Pocono is used throughout the year by Sports Car Club of America (SCCA) and motorcycle clubs as well as racing schools. The triangular oval also has three separate infield sections of racetrack – North Course, East Course and South Course. Each of these infield sections use a separate portion of the tri-oval to complete the track. During regular non-race weekends, multiple clubs can use the track by running on different infield sections. Also some of the infield sections can be run in either direction, or multiple infield sections can be put together – such as running the North Course and the South Course and using the tri-oval to connect the two.

Kevin Harvick entered Pocono with a 44-point lead over Martin Truex Jr. following a runner-up finish at Dover. Jimmie Johnson and Joey Logano entered 76 back. Dale Earnhardt Jr. entered 84 back.

==== Pit crew apparel ====
Beginning this weekend, all pit crew members were required to wear specially made gloves, head socks and underwear that are certified by the SFI Foundation. Previously, only the gas can man was required to wear all these items.

==== Entry list ====
The entry list for the Axalta "We Paint Winners" 400 was released on Monday, June 1 at 4:45 p.m. Eastern time. Forty-three cars were entered for the race. This was the first race this season in which nobody failed to qualify for the race. The two driver changes from the previous race to this race were the No. 32 Go FAS Racing Ford that was driven by Travis Kvapil and the No. 33 Hillman-Circle Sport LLC Chevrolet that was driven by Ty Dillon.

No.	Driver	Team	Manufacturer
1	Jamie McMurray	Chip Ganassi Racing	Chevrolet
2	Brad Keselowski (PC3)	Team Penske	Ford
3	Austin Dillon	Richard Childress Racing	Chevrolet
4	Kevin Harvick (PC1)	Stewart–Haas Racing	Chevrolet
5	Kasey Kahne	Hendrick Motorsports	Chevrolet
6	Trevor Bayne	Roush Fenway Racing	Ford
7	Alex Bowman	Tommy Baldwin Racing	Chevrolet
9	Sam Hornish Jr.	Richard Petty Motorsports	Ford
10	Danica Patrick	Stewart–Haas Racing	Chevrolet
11	Denny Hamlin	Joe Gibbs Racing	Toyota
13	Casey Mears	Germain Racing	Chevrolet
14	Tony Stewart (PC4)	Stewart–Haas Racing	Chevrolet
15	Clint Bowyer	Michael Waltrip Racing	Toyota
16	Greg Biffle	Roush Fenway Racing	Ford
17	Ricky Stenhouse Jr.	Roush Fenway Racing	Ford
18	Kyle Busch	Joe Gibbs Racing	Toyota
19	Carl Edwards	Joe Gibbs Racing	Toyota
20	Matt Kenseth (PC6)	Joe Gibbs Racing	Toyota
22	Joey Logano	Team Penske	Ford
23	J. J. Yeley (i)	BK Racing	Toyota
24	Jeff Gordon (PC7)	Hendrick Motorsports	Chevrolet
26	Jeb Burton (R)	BK Racing	Toyota
27	Paul Menard	Richard Childress Racing	Chevrolet
31	Ryan Newman	Richard Childress Racing	Chevrolet
32	Travis Kvapil (i)	Go FAS Racing	Ford
33	Ty Dillon (i)	Hillman-Circle Sport LLC	Chevrolet
34	Brett Moffitt (R)	Front Row Motorsports	Ford
35	Cole Whitt	Front Row Motorsports	Ford
38	David Gilliland	Front Row Motorsports	Ford
40	Landon Cassill (i)	Hillman-Circle Sport LLC	Chevrolet
41	Kurt Busch (PC5)	Stewart–Haas Racing	Chevrolet
42	Kyle Larson	Chip Ganassi Racing	Chevrolet
43	Aric Almirola	Richard Petty Motorsports	Ford
46	Michael Annett	HScott Motorsports	Chevrolet
47	A. J. Allmendinger	JTG Daugherty Racing	Chevrolet
48	Jimmie Johnson (PC2)	Hendrick Motorsports	Chevrolet
51	Justin Allgaier	HScott Motorsports	Chevrolet
55	David Ragan	Michael Waltrip Racing	Toyota
62	Brendan Gaughan (i)	Premium Motorsports	Chevrolet
78	Martin Truex Jr.	Furniture Row Racing	Chevrolet
83	Matt DiBenedetto (R)	BK Racing	Toyota
88	Dale Earnhardt Jr.	Hendrick Motorsports	Chevrolet
98	Josh Wise	Phil Parsons Racing	Ford
Official initial entry list
Official final entry list

Key	Meaning
(R)	Rookie
(i)	Ineligible for points
(PC#)	Past champions provisional

== First practice ==
Kevin Harvick was the fastest in the first practice session with a time of 50.867 and a speed of 176.932 mph (284.744 km/h). Eighty-five minutes into the session, Tony Stewart got loose exiting turn 2, slid down and crashed into the tire barrier on the inside wall. Stewart told Fox Sports 1, “I was already past the bump (from the tunnel turn), got loose on the exit of it and I couldn’t catch it. So, driver error.” The damage sustained forced the team to roll out their backup car. Because this change took place prior to qualifying, he won't be required to start the race from the rear of the field.

Pos	No.	Driver	Team	Manufacturer	Time	Speed
1	4	Kevin Harvick	Stewart–Haas Racing	Chevrolet	50.867	176.932
2	18	Kyle Busch	Joe Gibbs Racing	Toyota	50.913	176.772
3	19	Carl Edwards	Joe Gibbs Racing	Toyota	50.929	176.717
Official first practice results

== Qualifying ==
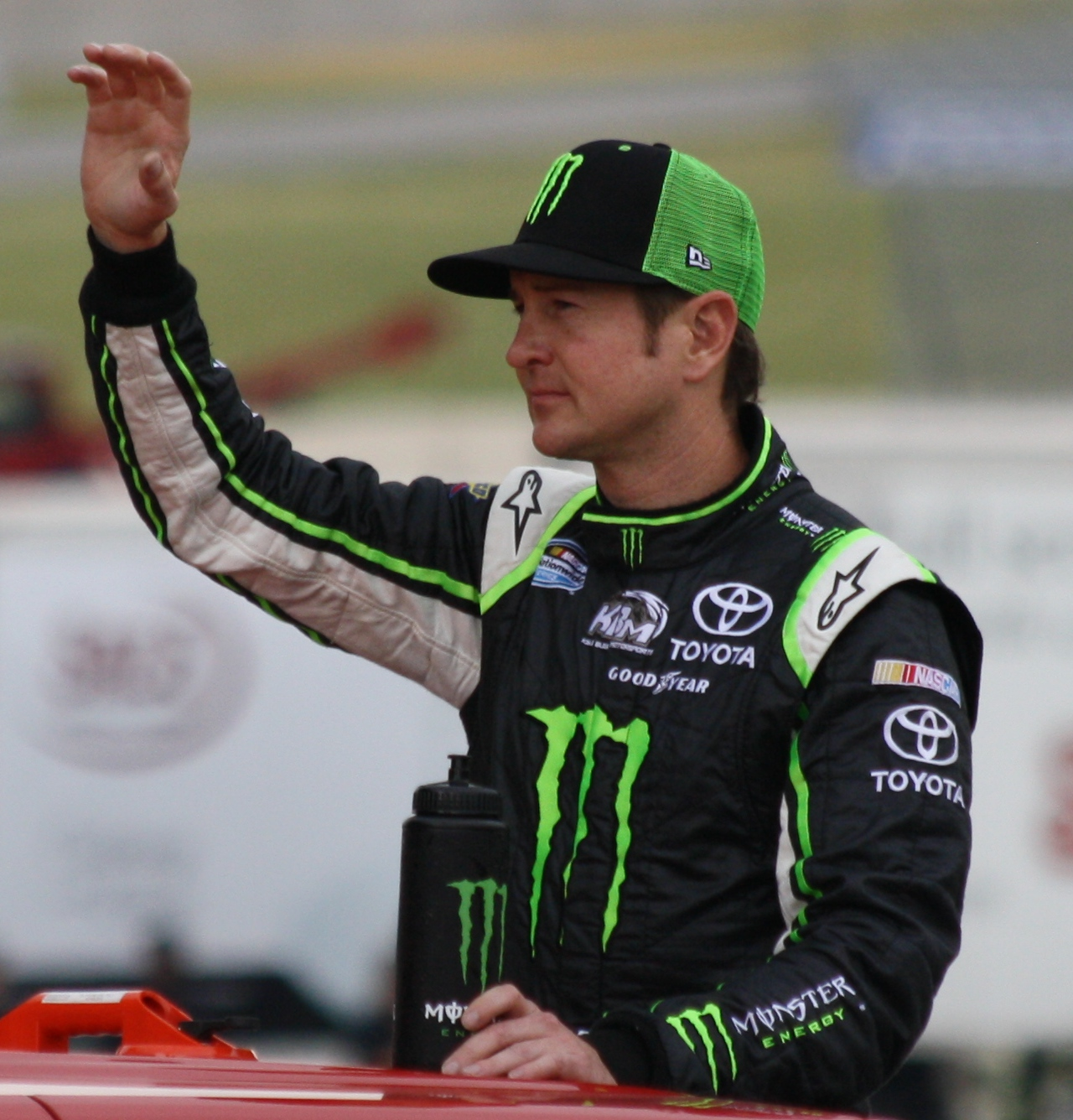
Kurt Busch, seen here in 2012, scored the pole for the race.

“It’s something we are going to look at,’’ O’Donnell said. “In this case is it the right decision to have a driver, not on purpose, cause a caution and therefore they qualify ahead of … drivers who may have not been able to go out and qualify? Some folks could say that’s on them, they should have gone out earlier, but you also look at it if that is the right move. We’re taking a hard look at that this weekend. We’ve had some dialogue with some of the industry and we’ll make a decision here shortly.’’

— NASCAR Executive Vice-President Steve O'Donnell speaking on Sirius XM NASCAR Radio.

Kurt Busch won the pole with a time of 50.676 and a speed of 177.599 mph (285.818 km/h). “Wow, what a day, today,” Busch said. “I feel like there are six corners out there as hard as I was working; corner entry, corner exit. The car was just off-balance, especially with the new bumps in Turn 2. And then we got way loose. I think we were 30th in practice. And we had to drop back and punt. (Danica Patrick’s crew chief) Daniel Knost, his set-up, is what we reverted to from last year when we qualified outside pole. So, that’s what it’s all about, team communication and working hard together as a group.” “Yeah, I was just disappointed that we didn’t have great speed,” Brad Keselowski said after qualifying seventh. “I’m not really sure why, but that’s just part of it.” Only seven drivers posted a time in the final round after Denny Hamlin spun out in turn 1. The session was stopped with 39 seconds remaining. Because no one would be able to make it around in the remaining time to start a qualifying lap, the session was concluded. “The circumstances though, I’d like to see everybody finish their lap,” Busch said. “I always thought they should freeze the time when somebody spins. That way everybody still gets to get back out there and make their lap."

Questions were raised over Denny Hamlin getting placed ahead of the other four drivers that didn't post a time in the third round since his spin caused the session to end prematurely. In his weekly appearance on the Sirius XM NASCAR Radio program The Morning Drive the Tuesday after the race, NASCAR Executive Vice-President and Chief Operating Officer Steve O'Donnell discussed with Mike Bagley and Pete Pistone about changing that particular policy.

=== Qualifying results ===
Pos	No.	Driver	Team	Manufacturer	R1	R2	R3
1	41	Kurt Busch	Stewart–Haas Racing	Chevrolet	51.116	51.055	50.676
2	19	Carl Edwards	Joe Gibbs Racing	Toyota	50.851	50.996	50.690
3	78	Martin Truex Jr.	Furniture Row Racing	Chevrolet	50.873	50.912	50.698
4	24	Jeff Gordon	Hendrick Motorsports	Chevrolet	50.725	51.006	50.787
5	4	Kevin Harvick	Stewart–Haas Racing	Chevrolet	50.693	50.645	50.790
6	3	Austin Dillon	Richard Childress Racing	Chevrolet	50.872	50.904	50.984
7	2	Brad Keselowski	Team Penske	Ford	51.215	51.124	51.146
8	11	Denny Hamlin	Joe Gibbs Racing	Toyota	50.863	50.654	0.000
9	48	Jimmie Johnson	Hendrick Motorsports	Chevrolet	50.960	50.737	0.000
10	18	Kyle Busch	Joe Gibbs Racing	Toyota	50.718	50.792	0.000
11	22	Joey Logano (Note: Joey Logano changed rear-end gears and started the race from the rear of the field.)	Team Penske	Ford	51.001	50.905	0.000
12	5	Kasey Kahne	Hendrick Motorsports	Chevrolet	51.017	51.116	0.000
13	31	Ryan Newman	Richard Childress Racing	Chevrolet	50.950	51.126	—
14	1	Jamie McMurray	Chip Ganassi Racing	Chevrolet	51.054	51.135	—
15	42	Kyle Larson	Chip Ganassi Racing	Chevrolet	51.232	51.153	—
16	27	Paul Menard	Richard Childress Racing	Chevrolet	51.094	51.167	—
17	17	Ricky Stenhouse Jr.	Roush Fenway Racing	Ford	51.429	51.224	—
18	13	Casey Mears	Germain Racing	Chevrolet	50.986	51.232	—
19	20	Matt Kenseth	Joe Gibbs Racing	Toyota	51.327	51.273	—
20	88	Dale Earnhardt Jr.	Hendrick Motorsports	Chevrolet	51.044	51.292	—
21	55	David Ragan	Michael Waltrip Racing	Toyota	51.317	51.306	—
22	10	Danica Patrick	Stewart–Haas Racing	Chevrolet	51.280	51.478	—
23	15	Clint Bowyer	Michael Waltrip Racing	Toyota	51.452	51.654	—
24	9	Sam Hornish Jr.	Richard Petty Motorsports	Ford	51.432	51.778	—
25	43	Aric Almirola	Richard Petty Motorsports	Ford	51.490	—	—
26	47	A. J. Allmendinger	JTG Daugherty Racing	Chevrolet	51.496	—	—
27	16	Greg Biffle	Roush Fenway Racing	Ford	51.522	—	—
28	14	Tony Stewart	Stewart–Haas Racing	Chevrolet	51.531	—	—
29	33	Ty Dillon (i)	Richard Childress Racing	Chevrolet	51.630	—	—
30	51	Justin Allgaier	HScott Motorsports	Chevrolet	51.715	—	—
31	46	Michael Annett	HScott Motorsports	Chevrolet	51.762	—	—
32	40	Landon Cassill (i)	Hillman-Circle Sport LLC	Chevrolet	51.792	—	—
33	6	Trevor Bayne	Roush Fenway Racing	Ford	51.815	—	—
34	7	Alex Bowman	Tommy Baldwin Racing	Chevrolet	51.900	—	—
35	38	David Gilliland	Front Row Motorsports	Ford	52.184	—	—
36	34	Brett Moffitt (R)	Front Row Motorsports	Ford	52.193	—	—
37	23	J. J. Yeley (i)	BK Racing	Toyota	52.329	—	—
38	98	Josh Wise	Phil Parsons Racing	Ford	52.360	—	—
39	35	Cole Whitt	Front Row Motorsports	Ford	52.401	—	—
40	26	Jeb Burton (R)	BK Racing	Toyota	52.748	—	—
41	83	Matt DiBenedetto (R)	BK Racing	Toyota	53.116	—	—
42	32	Travis Kvapil (i)	Go FAS Racing	Ford	53.216	—	—
43	62	Brendan Gaughan (i)	Premium Motorsports	Chevrolet	0.000	—	—
Official qualifying results

== Practice (post-qualifying) ==
=== Second practice ===
Kevin Harvick was the fastest in the second practice session with a time of 51.236 and a speed of 175.658 mph (282.694 km/h).

Pos	No.	Driver	Team	Manufacturer	Time	Speed
1	4	Kevin Harvick	Stewart–Haas Racing	Chevrolet	51.236	175.658
2	88	Dale Earnhardt Jr.	Hendrick Motorsports	Chevrolet	51.254	175.596
3	19	Carl Edwards	Joe Gibbs Racing	Toyota	51.255	175.593
Official second practice results

=== Final practice ===
Kevin Harvick was the fastest in the final practice session with a time of 51.144 and a speed of 175.974 mph (283.203 km/h).

Pos	No.	Driver	Team	Manufacturer	Time	Speed
1	4	Kevin Harvick	Stewart–Haas Racing	Chevrolet	51.144	175.974
2	42	Kyle Larson	Chip Ganassi Racing	Chevrolet	51.343	175.292
3	5	Kasey Kahne	Hendrick Motorsports	Chevrolet	51.454	174.914
Official final practice results

== Race ==
=== First half ===
==== Start ====
The race was scheduled to start at 1:20 p.m., but started one minute later when Kurt Busch led the field to the green flag. He didn't lead the first lap, however, as Carl Edwards passed him in turn 1. Jeff Gordon pulled to within a car length of him, but began pulling away from the field after a few laps. By lap 14, Martin Truex Jr. and Kevin Harvick reeled in Edwards. After a few attempts at him, Truex made the pass on Edwards and took the lead on lap 16. Brad Keselowski, running seventh, made an unscheduled stop on lap 21. He rejoined the race 37th. This triggered a wave of cars making this first pit stops of the race. Matt Kenseth, Joey Logano and Paul Menard were tagged for speeding on pit road. Kenseth and Logano were forced to serve a drive-through penalty. Menard was forced to serve a stop-go penalty for speeding in all sections after his pit box. He had to come a second time for speeding again. He cut down his left-front tire and came down pit road for a third time. Truex, Jr. made his first pit stop on lap 29 and handed the lead to Edwards. Edwards pitted on lap 30 and handed the lead to Kasey Kahne, who made his stop on lap 32. Then the lead was given back to Kevin Harvick.

==== Second quarter ====
Debris on the front stretch brought out the first caution on lap 49. The debris was a piece of the splitter from Menard's car. Truex exited pit road with the lead by taking just two tires.

The race restarted on lap 55. Truex's lead over Harvick began to shrink by lap 65. The second caution flew on lap 69 when Ricky Stenhouse Jr., going into the tunnel turn, dove into the corner to try passing Casey Mears, got loose, overcorrected, and slammed the wall. "The brakes were getting hot and we were having to pump them up," Stenhouse said. "They kind of maintained the first run and everything felt OK. I was still having to pump it up and on that last run I was having to pump them up three or four times, and then when the 13 (Mears) got into us down the back straightaway I was too busy catching it and too busy being sideways, and then once I finally caught it I didn't have time to pump up the brakes and the brakes went to the floor. Then I was just trying to make it through the corner without hitting anybody else and tried to keep it out of the wall, but didn't quite do it." Harvick chose not to pit, so he had the lead under the caution.

=== Second half ===
==== Halfway ====
The race restarted on lap 74. The third caution of the race flew on lap 88 when Jimmie Johnson cut down his left-front tire in turn 2. He was able to get his car down to the bottom of the track. Austin Dillon chose not to pit under the caution, so he assumed the lead.

The race restarted with on lap 93. Gordon passed Dillon going into turn 1 and took the lead. The fourth caution flew the same lap when Alex Bowman, going into turn 3, got turned by Brett Moffitt and spun. Gordon pitted and handed the lead to Martin Truex Jr.

The race restarted on lap 97. The fifth caution of the race flew with 39 laps to go for a single car wreck in turn 1. Going into 1, Sam Hornish Jr. cut a tire and slammed the wall hard.

==== Fourth quarter ====
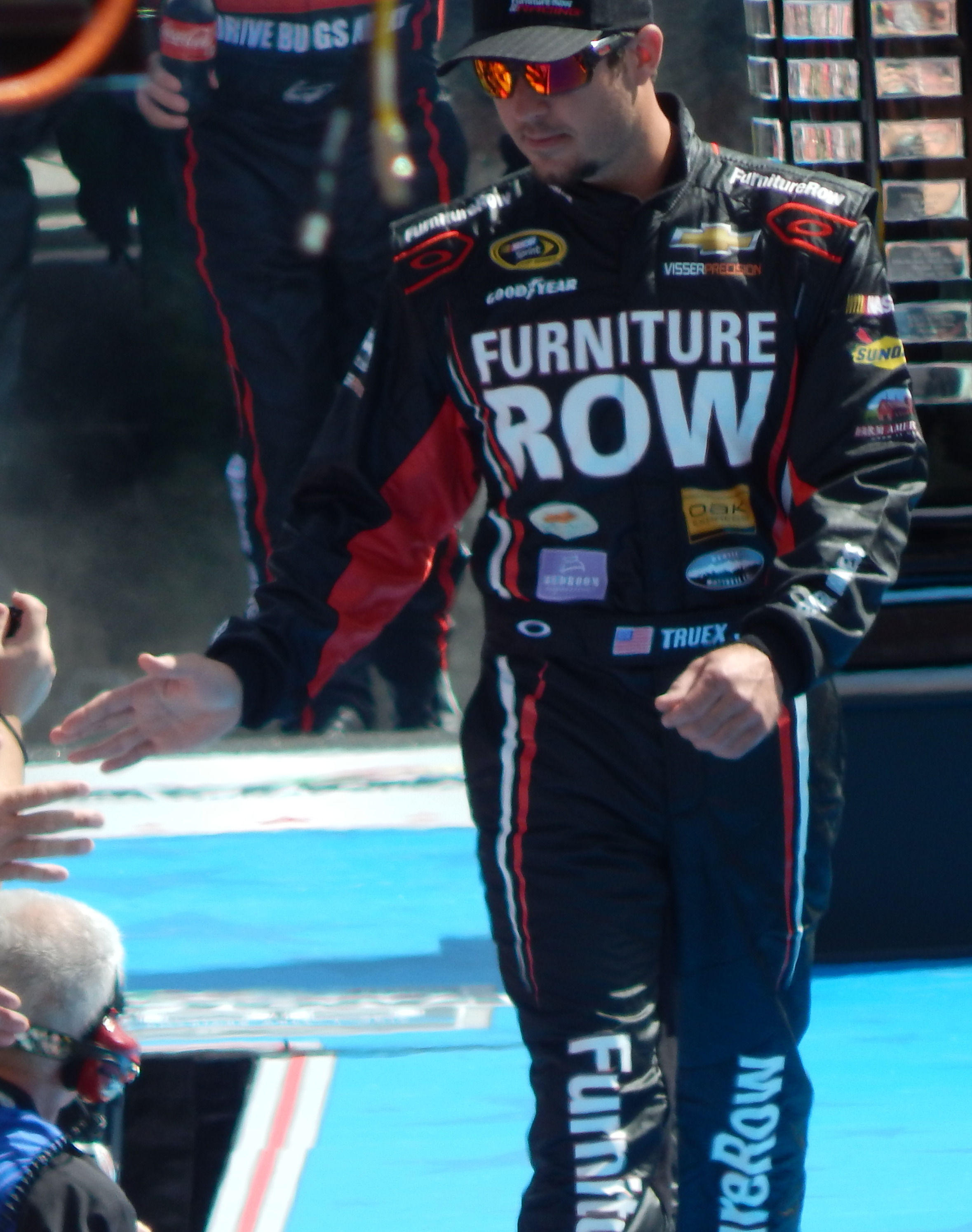
Martin Truex Jr., seen here at the 2015 Daytona 500, snapped a 69 race winless drought and scored the third victory of his career at Pocono.

The race restarted with 35 laps to go. The sixth caution of the race flew with 32 laps to go for a single car wreck in turn 1. As Moffitt was riding the high line in 1, Brad Keselowski hit him in the left rear corner and sent the No. 34 car spinning. Tony Stewart was tagged for an uncontrolled tire and was forced to restart the race from the rear of the field.

The race restarted with 27 laps to go. The seventh caution of the race flew for a single car wreck in turn 1. After making hard contact with the wall exiting turn 4, Danica Patrick cut down the right-rear tire and backed into the turn 1 wall. "I was trying the best I could to get back into the top-10, and the car just hopped the wall," Patrick said. "We were having a great race, and I hate that wrecked our day.”

The race restarted with 21 laps to go. The eighth caution of the race flew with 20 laps to go for a single car wreck in turn 1. Going through the corner, A. J. Allmendinger got loose, drifted up the track, tapped Ryan Newman and sent him right into the wall.

The race restarted with 16 laps to go. Patrick spun out exiting turn 3, but because she spun into pit road, the race remained green. Truex Jr. pulled away from the field to snap a 69 race winless streak.

== Post-race ==
=== Post-race comments ===
“It feels unbelievable, I knew we were going to get one. Everyone kept asking when are you going to get one. I knew we were going to win. I knew we had the team and what it took. I feel that I’m on Cloud Nine right now. The last year and a half have been pretty tough, but this feels real good. It never gets any better than this. It takes time to heal things especially with what Sherry and I went through. This just kind of makes you forget all about it. Tomorrow we are still going back to normal life and we always try to remember that and be ourselves and remember why we are here. And how thankful we are to be here and how lucky we are to be doing this. I just feel super blessed to be with this group of guys.” Truex said.

“I think everybody is probably frustrated that we didn't win, but I think it's frustrated in a good way, it's very rare that you can come to the racetrack and be in those positions every week. I think when you look at the just like today, we were literally coming to pit road when the caution flag flew and never really made up those ten spots that we lost, and struggled on the restarts to get going. I think as you look at the situations, I think second is better than tenth.” Harvick said of his latest second-place finish on Sunday.

Jimmie Johnson rallied from a cut tire and brushing the wall to finish third. “Today we really didn't have pace for the 78 (Truex Jr.) or the 4 (Harvick), so we've got to get to work there,” Johnson said. “With the damaged car we ran third, missing half the splitter and the right side knocked in, some hard racing on one of those restarts off Turn 3. To get a good result, we overcame a lot today, having to deal with a flat tire, the damage to the car, and then I got to third. We'll take it. Scrappy day for us, but not the end of the world, either.”

Jimmie Johnson had some words of congrats for the race winner. "He's had more to overcome personally and professionally than probably anybody sitting in that seat right now," Johnson said. "For him to still walk in the garage every week with a smile on his face, climb in the car, be the great guy he is, I think speak volumes. It's a very popular win."

== Race results ==
Pos	No.	Driver	Team	Manufacturer	Laps	Points
1	78	Martin Truex Jr.	Furniture Row Racing	Chevrolet	160	48
2	4	Kevin Harvick	Stewart–Haas Racing	Chevrolet	160	43
3	48	Jimmie Johnson	Hendrick Motorsports	Chevrolet	160	41
4	22	Joey Logano	Team Penske	Ford	160	40
5	41	Kurt Busch	Stewart–Haas Racing	Chevrolet	160	39
6	20	Matt Kenseth	Joe Gibbs Racing	Toyota	160	38
7	1	Jamie McMurray	Chip Ganassi Racing	Chevrolet	160	37
8	42	Kyle Larson	Chip Ganassi Racing	Chevrolet	160	36
9	18	Kyle Busch	Joe Gibbs Racing	Toyota	160	35
10	11	Denny Hamlin	Joe Gibbs Racing	Toyota	160	34
11	88	Dale Earnhardt Jr.	Hendrick Motorsports	Chevrolet	160	33
12	16	Greg Biffle	Roush Fenway Racing	Ford	160	32
13	5	Kasey Kahne	Hendrick Motorsports	Chevrolet	160	32
14	24	Jeff Gordon	Hendrick Motorsports	Chevrolet	160	31
15	19	Carl Edwards	Joe Gibbs Racing	Toyota	160	30
16	13	Casey Mears	Germain Racing	Chevrolet	160	28
17	2	Brad Keselowski	Team Penske	Ford	160	27
18	33	Ty Dillon (i)	Hillman-Circle Sport LLC	Chevrolet	160	0
19	3	Austin Dillon	Richard Childress Racing	Chevrolet	160	26
20	51	Justin Allgaier	HScott Motorsports	Chevrolet	160	24
21	14	Tony Stewart	Stewart–Haas Racing	Chevrolet	160	23
22	15	Clint Bowyer	Michael Waltrip Racing	Toyota	160	22
23	55	David Ragan	Michael Waltrip Racing	Toyota	160	21
24	6	Trevor Bayne	Roush Fenway Racing	Ford	160	20
25	40	Landon Cassill (i)	Hillman-Circle Sport LLC	Chevrolet	160	0
26	7	Alex Bowman	Tommy Baldwin Racing	Chevrolet	160	18
27	38	David Gilliland	Front Row Motorsports	Ford	160	17
28	35	Cole Whitt	Front Row Motorsports	Ford	160	16
29	98	Josh Wise	Phil Parsons Racing	Ford	159	15
30	34	Brett Moffitt (R)	Front Row Motorsports	Ford	158	14
31	27	Paul Menard	Richard Childress Racing	Chevrolet	158	13
32	83	Matt DiBenedetto (R)	BK Racing	Toyota	158	12
33	26	Jeb Burton (R)	BK Racing	Toyota	158	11
34	46	Michael Annett	HScott Motorsports	Chevrolet	158	10
35	32	Travis Kvapil (i)	Go FAS Racing	Ford	157	0
36	23	J. J. Yeley (i)	BK Racing	Toyota	155	0
37	10	Danica Patrick	Stewart–Haas Racing	Chevrolet	153	7
38	47	A. J. Allmendinger	JTG Daugherty Racing	Chevrolet	143	6
39	31	Ryan Newman	Richard Childress Racing	Chevrolet	141	5
40	62	Brendan Gaughan (i)	Premium Motorsports	Chevrolet	129	0
41	9	Sam Hornish Jr.	Richard Petty Motorsports	Ford	120	3
42	17	Ricky Stenhouse Jr.	Roush Fenway Racing	Ford	105	2
43	43	Aric Almirola	Richard Petty Motorsports	Ford	88	1
Official Axalta "We Paint Winners" 400 results

=== Race statistics ===
- 12 lead changes among 6 different drivers
- 8 cautions for 31 laps
- Time of race: 2 hours, 58 minutes, 45 seconds
- Average speed: 134.266 mph (216.080 km/h)
- Martin Truex Jr. took home $201,810 in winnings

Lap Leaders
Laps	Leader
1-14	Carl Edwards
15-27	Martin Truex Jr.
28-29	Carl Edwards
30-31	Kasey Kahne
32-51	Kevin Harvick
52-69	Martin Truex Jr.
70-87	Kevin Harvick
88-92	Austin Dillon
93	Jeff Gordon
94-132	Martin Truex Jr.
133	Kevin Harvick
134-160	Martin Truex Jr.

Total laps led
Leader	Laps
Martin Truex Jr.	97
Kevin Harvick	39
Carl Edwards	16
Austin Dillon	5
Kasey Kahne	2
Jeff Gordon	1

==== Race awards ====
- Coors Light Pole Award: Kurt Busch (50.676, 177.599 mph (285.818 km/h))
- 3M Lap Leader: Martin Truex Jr. (97 laps)
- American Ethanol Green Flag Restart Award: Martin Truex Jr.
- Duralast Brakes "Bake In The Race" Award: Kevin Harvick
- Freescale "Wide Open": Kevin Harvick
- Ingersoll Rand Power Move: Jeff Gordon (6 positions)
- MAHLE Clevite Engine Builder of the Race: Hendrick Engines, #4
- Mobil 1 Driver of the Race: Martin Truex Jr. (147.0 driver rating)
- Moog Steering and Suspension Problem Solver of The Race: Joey Logano (crew chief Todd Gordon (0.412))
- NASCAR Sprint Cup Leader Bonus: No winner: rolls over to $110,000 at next event
- Sherwin-Williams Fastest Lap: Kyle Busch (Lap 101, 51.852, 173.570 mph (279.334 km/h))
- Sunoco Rookie of The Race: Brett Moffitt

== Media ==
=== Television ===
Fox Sports covered their seventh race at Pocono Raceway and first since 2006. Mike Joy, Larry McReynolds and four-time Pocono winner Darrell Waltrip had the call in the booth for the race. Jamie Little, Chris Neville and Matt Yocum handled the pit road duties for the television side.

Fox Sports 1
Booth announcers	Pit reporters
Lap-by-lap: Mike Joy; Color-commentator: Larry McReynolds; Color-commentator: Darrell Waltrip	Jamie Little; Chris Neville; Matt Yocum

=== Radio ===
MRN had the radio call for the race, which was simulcast on Sirius XM NASCAR Radio. Joe Moore and Jeff Striegle called the race in the booth when the field was racing down the front stretch. Dave Moody called the race from atop a billboard outside of turn 1 when the field was racing through turn 1. Mike Bagley called the race from a billboard outside turn 2 when the field was racing through turn 2. Kyle Rickey called the race from a billboard outside turn 3 when the field was racing through turn 3. Alex Hayden, Winston Kelley and Steve Post worked pit road for MRN.

MRN
Booth announcers	Turn announcers	Pit reporters
Lead announcer: Joe Moore; Announcer: Jeff Striegle	Turn 1: Dave Moody; Turn 2: Mike Bagley; Turn 3: Kyle Rickey	Alex Hayden; Winston Kelley; Steve Post

== Standings after the race ==
Drivers' Championship standings

	Pos	Driver	Points
	1	Kevin Harvick	559
	2	Martin Truex Jr.	520 (-39)
	3	Jimmie Johnson	481 (-78)
	4	Joey Logano	480 (-79)
	5	Dale Earnhardt Jr.	465 (-94)
	6	Brad Keselowski	441 (-118)
	7	Jamie McMurray	427 (-132)
	8	Kasey Kahne	417 (-142)
2	9	Matt Kenseth	415 (-144)
1	10	Jeff Gordon	411 (-148)
1	11	Paul Menard	385 (-174)
3	12	Kurt Busch	379 (-180)
1	13	Denny Hamlin	379 (-180)
4	14	Aric Almirola	379 (-180)
2	15	Ryan Newman	374 (-185)
	16	Carl Edwards	368 (-191)

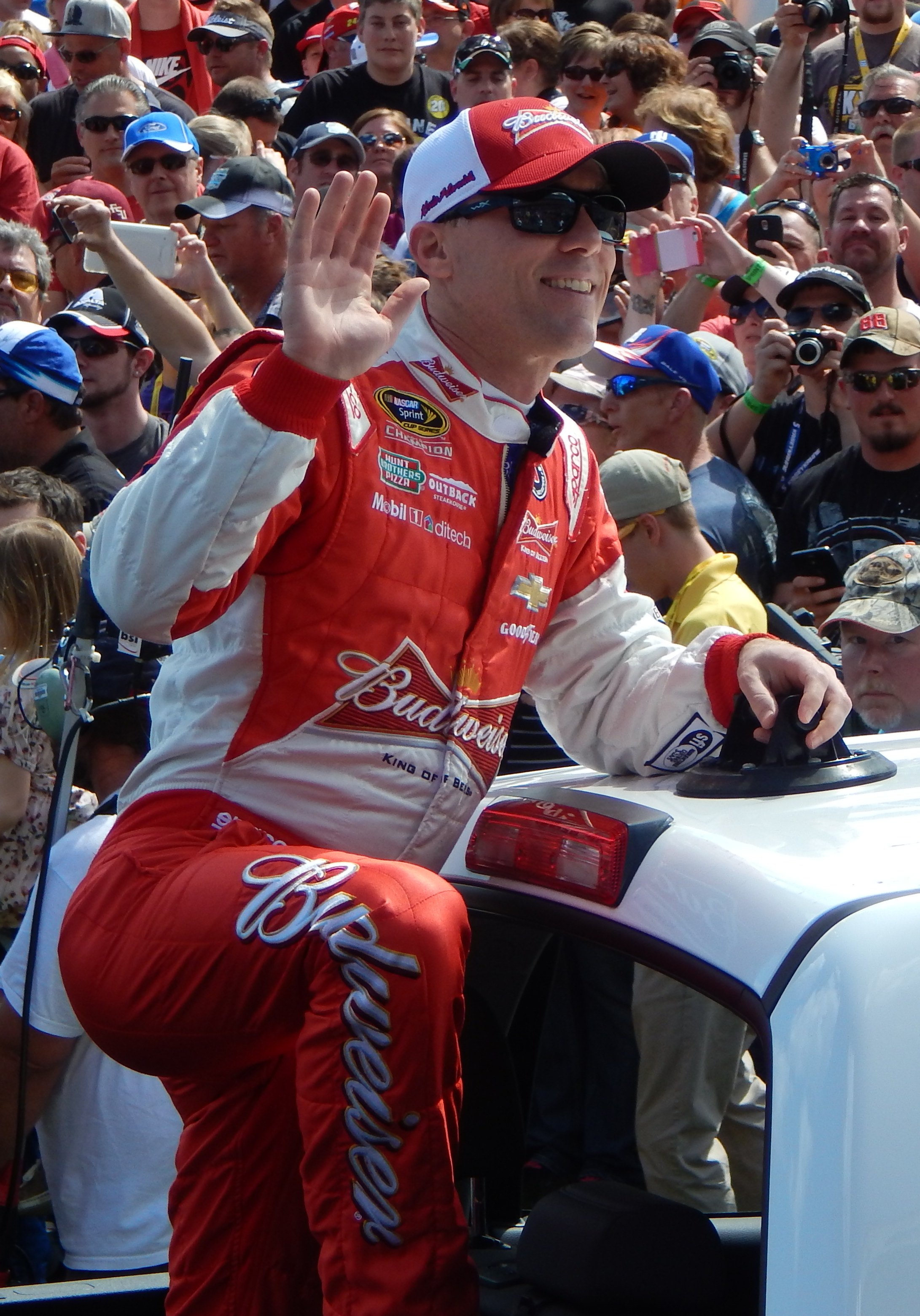
Kevin Harvick left Pocono with a 39-point lead over Martin Truex Jr.

Manufacturers' Championship standings

Pos	Manufacturer	Points
1	Chevrolet	636
2	Ford	577 (-59)
3	Toyota	544 (-92)

- Note: Only the first sixteen positions are included for the driver standings.

== Note ==
Previous race: 2015 FedEx 400	Sprint Cup Series; 2015 season	Next race: 2015 Quicken Loans 400
