= SFI Foundation =

SFI Foundation, Inc. (SFI), formerly known as SEMA Foundation, Inc., is a nonprofit organization which administers standard for motorsports equipment, including racing suits, roll cages and other technical components. The organisation was founded to prevent injuries among drivers, and today plays an important role in standardisation, certification and quality assurance of equipment. The FIA approves or in certain cases requires SFI-approved equipment in competitions.

== History ==
In 1963, there several manufacturers of racing products came together and founded the Speed Equipment Manufacturers Association (SEMA) for creating product specifications to make racing products safer. After a while, some of these specifications became requirements in auto racing through rulebooks of the sanctioning bodies.

In the 1970s, SEMA shifted its focus to legislation and government regulations, marketing, the SEMA Show and various activities in connection with trade associations in the motorsport industry. The responsibility of product specifications and testing was taken care of by the SEMA Service Bureau.

In 1978, it became clear that more focus was needed to advance product specifications, and the SEMA Service Bureau was separated and became its own under the name SEMA Foundation, Inc. (SFI). The name has since been changed to simply SFI Foundation, Inc. or SFI for short. Even though SFI started as a part of SEMA (which since has changed its name to Specialty Equipment Marketing Association), these two organisations today are independent of each other, and SFI no longer stands for the abbreviation of SEMA Foundation, Inc.

== Standards ==
=== Racing suits ===
The SFI Foundation dictates fire protection standards for racing suits for numerous sanctioning bodies particularly in the United States, including NASCAR, IndyCar, NHRA, Sports Car Club of America (SCCA), and the United States Auto Club (USAC). The SFI Foundation also compiles a list of manufacturers that make SFI rated 3.2A driver suits. The FIA has its own standards for most of its series such as Formula One and the FIA World Endurance Championship, except for FIA drag racing competitions which follows the SFI standards. SFI and FIA standards are also used by other organizations outside their jurisdiction, such as the Confederation of Australian Motor Sport (CAMS).

In 2015 in NASCAR, from the Axalta 400 race, it became a requirement that mechanics had to wear gloves, balaclavas and underwear certified by SFI. Until then, only those who filled fuel were required to wear such garments.

=== Neck devices ===
Since 2008, many many motorsport organizations have approved neck protection devices according to the SFI Foundation Specification 38.1 standard, which initially included HANS devices and Hutchens devices. From 2009, the FIA made the HANS device mandatory in international races, and a few years later this became a requirement in most car racing. Hutchens devices are mostly no longer approved.
