= SFL =

SFL may refer to:

== Sports leagues ==
=== Association football ===
- Serbian First League, an association football league in Serbia
- Southern Football League, an association football league in England
- Soviet First League, a former association football league in the Soviet Union
- Super Football League, an inter-city football league in Pakistan
- Scottish Football League, a former association football league
- Southern Football League (Scotland), wartime league
- Sunday Football League (Lithuania)
- Swiss Football League

=== Australian rules football ===
- Southern Football League (South Australia)
- Southern Football League (Tasmania)
- Southern Football League (Victoria)
- Sunday Football League, Perth, Western Australia
- Sunraysia Football League, Victoria

=== Other sports ===
- Spring Football League, former American football league
- Stars Football League, Grand Rapids, Michigan, US
- Super Fight League, mixed martial arts league, India
- Swedish Futsal League

== Other uses ==
- Saskatchewan Federation of Labour, Canada
- Scandinavian Ferry Lines
- Sci-Fi-London, a film festival in England
- Students for Liberty, American organization
- System Function Language of the ICL VME operating system
- Systemic functional linguistics, language as a social semiotic system
