= EID2 =

Protein-coding gene found in humans

Identifiers
- Aliases: EID2, CRI2, EID-2, EP300 interacting inhibitor of differentiation 2
- External IDs: OMIM: 609773; MGI: 2681174; GeneCards: EID2

Gene location (Human)
Chr.	Chromosome 19 (human)
Band	19q13.2	Start	39,538,707 bp
Band	19q13.2	End	39,540,161 bp

Gene location (Mouse)
Chr.	Chromosome 7 (mouse)
Band	7|7 A3	Start	27,967,306 bp
Band	7|7 A3	End	27,968,697 bp
RNA expression pattern
Bgee	Human / Mouse (ortholog); Top expressed in: myocardium of left ventricle; pons; cardiac muscle tissue of right atrium; cerebellar vermis; prefrontal cortex; mucosa of ileum; postcentral gyrus; tibialis anterior muscle; superior frontal gyrus; Brodmann area 9 / Top expressed in: superior cervical ganglion; hand; trigeminal ganglion; dorsomedial hypothalamic nucleus; fossa; otolith organ; utricle; condyle; suprachiasmatic nucleus; facial motor nucleus; More reference expression data
BioGPS	n/a
Gene ontology
Molecular function	protein binding; SMAD binding
Cellular component	intracellular anatomical structure; nucleus; nucleoplasm
Biological process	multicellular organism development; SMAD protein complex assembly; cell differentiation; muscle organ development; transforming growth factor beta receptor complex assembly; negative regulation of transcription, DNA-templated; regulation of transcription, DNA-templated; negative regulation of transforming growth factor beta receptor signaling pathway; regulation of cell population proliferation; transcription, DNA-templated; regulation of transforming growth factor beta receptor signaling pathway; negative regulation of transcription by RNA polymerase II
Sources:Amigo / QuickGO
Orthologs
Databases	NCBI: entry; OMA: entry
Species	Human	Mouse
Entrez	163126	386655
Ensembl	ENSG00000176396	ENSMUSG00000046058
UniProt	Q8N6I1	Q6X7S9
RefSeq (mRNA)	NM_153232	NM_198425
RefSeq (protein)	NP_694964	NP_940817
Location (UCSC)	Chr 19: 39.54 – 39.54 Mb	Chr 7: 27.97 – 27.97 Mb
PubMed search
- Wikidata
View/Edit Human	View/Edit Mouse

EP300 interacting inhibitor of differentiation 2, also known as EID2, is a human gene.

== Function ==
The protein encoded by this gene may function as an endogenous suppressor of TGF-beta signaling and inhibits differentiation by blocking the histone acetyltransferase activity of p300, class I histone deacetylase, HDACs. The N-terminal portion of EID-2 was required for the binding to HDACs. This region was also involved in the transcriptional repression and nuclear localization, suggesting the importance of the involvement of HDACs in the EID-2 function. EID-2 inhibits TGF-beta/Smad transcriptional responses. EID-2 interacts constitutively with Smad proteins, and most strongly with Smad3. Stable expression of EID-2 in the TGF-beta1-responsive cell line inhibits endogenous Smad3-Smad4 complex formation and TGF-beta1-induced expression of p21 and p15. EID-2 displays developmentally regulated expression with high levels in adult heart and brain. Overexpression of EID-2 inhibits muscle-specific gene expression through inhibition of MyoD-dependent transcription. This inhibitory effect on gene expression can be explained by EID-2's ability to associate with and inhibit the acetyltransferase activity of p300.
