= 2008 UAW-Dodge 400 =

Stock car race

Race details
- Race 3 of 36 in the 2008 NASCAR Sprint Cup Series
- The 2008 UAW-Dodge 400 program cover, with artwork by Sam Bass
- Date: March 2, 2008
- Official name: UAW-Dodge 400
- Location: Las Vegas Motor Speedway, Las Vegas, Nevada, US
- Course: Permanent racing facility
- Course length: 1.5 miles (2.41 km)
- Distance: 267 laps, 400.5 mi (644.542 km)
- Weather: Temperatures of 77 °F (25 °C); wind speeds of 28.9 miles per hour (46.5 km/h)
- Average speed: 127.729 miles per hour (205.560 km/h)

Pole position
Driver	Kyle Busch	Joe Gibbs Racing
- Time: 29.613

Most laps led
Driver	Carl Edwards	Roush Fenway Racing
- Laps: 86

Winner
No. 99	Carl Edwards	Roush Fenway Racing

Television in the United States
- Network: Fox Broadcasting Company
- Announcers: Mike Joy, Darrell Waltrip, Larry McReynolds
- Nielsen ratings: 7.1/13 (Final); 6.2/12 (Overnight); (12.1 million)

The 2008 UAW-Dodge 400 was the third stock car race of the 2008 NASCAR Sprint Cup Series. It was held on March 2, 2008, before a crowd of 153,000 at Las Vegas Motor Speedway in Las Vegas, Nevada, United States. The 267-lap race was won by Carl Edwards of the Roush Fenway Racing team, who started from second position. Hendrick Motorsports driver Dale Earnhardt Jr. finished second and Edwards's teammate Greg Biffle was third.

Kyle Busch, the pre-race Drivers' Championship leader over Ryan Newman, won the pole position with the fastest overall lap time in the qualifying session. Busch led the first twenty laps until he was passed by Edwards. He held the lead until the first green-flag pit stops and regained the position after the stops ended. Busch retook the lead on lap 81 and held it until he was passed by Matt Kenseth. Jeff Gordon took over the lead on lap 163, before Earnhardt became the leader on the 181st lap and maintained this position until Edwards regained it 14 laps later. The race was stopped for 17 minutes when Gordon crashed on lap 262, and car parts were strewn into the path of other drivers, requiring officials to clean the track. Edwards maintained the lead at the restart and held it to win the race. There were 11 cautions and 19 lead changes by nine different drivers during the race.

It was the second victory in succession that was achieved by Edwards over the course of the season, and the ninth of his career. He was later issued with a 100-point penalty after his car was found to violate NASCAR regulations, dropping him from first to seventh in the Drivers' Championship. Kyle Busch increased his lead over Ryan Newman to twenty points as a consequence. Ford took over the lead of the Manufacturers' Championship, five points ahead of Dodge. Chevrolet moved clear of Toyota in third place, with 33 races left in the season. The race attracted 12.1 million television viewers.

== Background ==
The race logo for the 2008 UAW-Dodge 400

The UAW-Dodge 400 was the third out of 36 scheduled stock car races of the 2008 NASCAR Sprint Cup Series. It ran for a total of 267 laps over a distance of 400 mi (640 km), and was held on March 2, 2008, in Las Vegas, Nevada, at Las Vegas Motor Speedway, an intermediate track that holds NASCAR races. The standard track at Las Vegas Motor Speedway is a four-turn 1.5-mile (2.4 km) oval. Its turns are banked at 20 degrees and both the front stretch (the location of the finish line) and the back stretch are banked at 9 degrees.

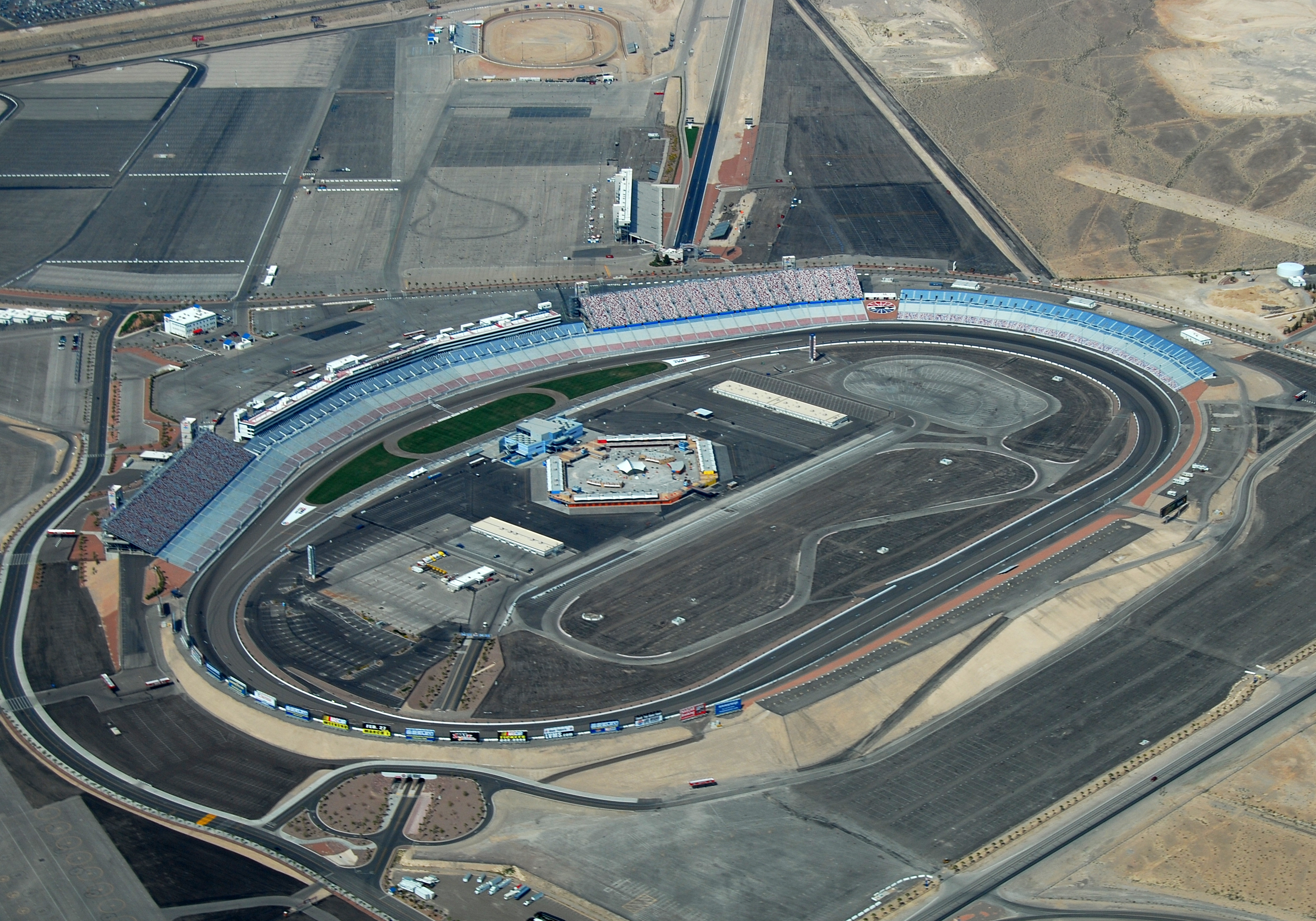
Las Vegas Motor Speedway, where the race was held

Before the race, Kyle Busch led the Drivers' Championship with 335 points, six points ahead of Ryan Newman in second and nineteen points over Tony Stewart in third. Kurt Busch and Carl Edwards were fourth and fifth, respectively, and Kasey Kahne, Kevin Harvick, Jimmie Johnson, Greg Biffle, Jeff Burton, Brian Vickers, and Martin Truex Jr. rounded out the top 12. In the Manufacturers' Championship, Dodge and Ford were tied for the lead with 12 points each; their rivals Chevrolet and Toyota were tied for third place with 10 points each. Johnson was the race's defending champion.

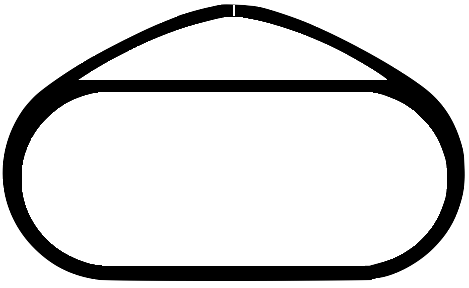
Track layout of Las Vegas Motor Speedway

In preparation for the race, NASCAR held the second of its two preseason tests for Sprint Cup entrants on January 28–29 at Las Vegas Motor Speedway. Sessions began at 9:00 am Eastern Standard Time (EST), paused from 12:00 to 1:00 pm, and concluded at 5:00 pm Sixty-seven cars participated in the January 28 morning session; Denny Hamlin was quickest with a top speed of 178.265 miles per hour (286.890 km/h), while Kyle Busch was quickest in the afternoon session, with a top speed of 183.350 miles per hour (295.073 km/h). Several incidents occurred during the second session; Regan Smith spun leaving turn two and damaged his car's nose after hitting the inside wall; Sam Hornish Jr. heavily damaged his car after scraping the wall hard; and Dario Franchitti heavily damaged his Dodge's rear after spinning. Jacques Villeneuve spun, but did not damage his car; David Ragan wrecked after spinning off turn two; and Mark Martin damaged the front of his vehicle when he hit a concrete piling after swerving to avoid a tow truck. During the third session with 74 cars, Edwards had the fastest speed of 184.256 miles per hour (296.531 km/h), and Burton damaged the right side of his car after hitting the wall. Juan Pablo Montoya recorded the fastest speed of the two days, at 186.761 miles per hour (300.563 km/h) in the fourth and final session.

Edwards was looking forward to the race weekend, and felt his result would be good. Biffle was confident he could secure a top-five finishing position, and stated if his car's handling were good, he believed he could be in contention for winning the race. Having won twice at the track in the early 2000s, Kenseth said he enjoyed racing at Las Vegas Motor Speedway and hoped the Roush Fenway Racing cars would be able to contend for race victories. Johnson was considered by some bookmakers as the favorite to win the race, and in the event he succeeded, he would have become the first person to secure four consecutive victories in a NASCAR Cup Series racing event since Jeff Gordon won the Southern 500 four times between 1995 and 1998. He said it would be "great" if he took the victory, but would not approach the event differently from at a track where he had not won a race.

One change of driver happened before the race. Jon Wood, the grandson of retired driver Glen Wood, was originally scheduled to replace 1988 NASCAR Winston Cup Series champion Bill Elliott in the No. 21 Wood Brothers Racing car, but withdrew because of a lack of experience with the Car of Tomorrow, and former Haas CNC Racing driver Johnny Sauter took over his seat. Wood said he felt Sauter was a better qualifier when Elliott was not available to drive. Kahne developed a sinus infection two days before the event, and his team had Nationwide Series driver Jason Keller ready to replace him if he could not compete.

== Practice and qualifier ==
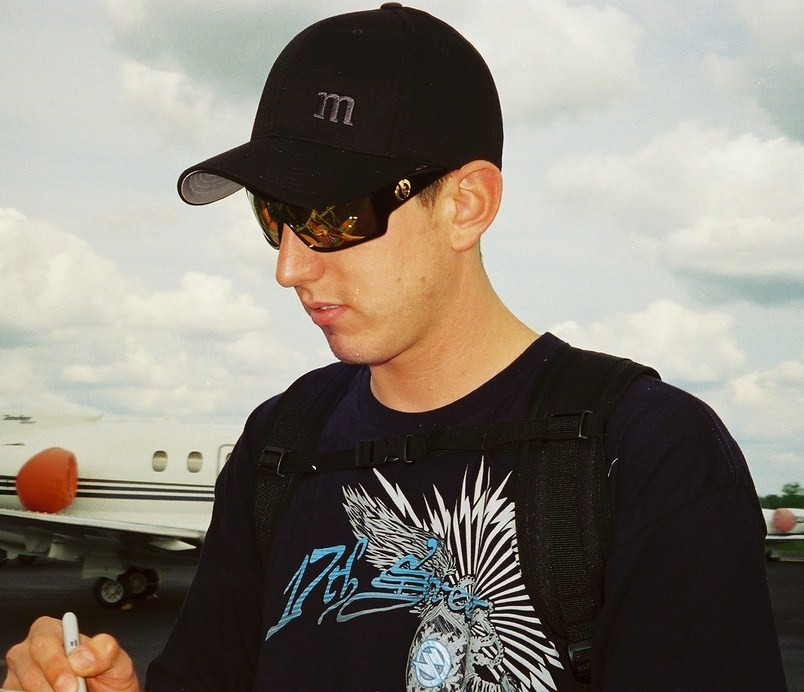
Kyle Busch had the third pole position of his career.

Three practice sessions were held before the Sunday race, one on Friday and two on Saturday. The first session lasted 90 minutes, the second 45 minutes and the third 60 minutes. In the first practice session, Kyle Busch was fastest with a time of 30.009 seconds; Jeff Gordon, Johnson, Stewart, David Reutimann, Dale Earnhardt Jr., Edwards, Elliott Sadler, Kurt Busch, and Jeremy Mayfield rounded out the session's top-10 fastest drivers. Hornish made contact with the turn-two barrier, while Reed Sorenson and Patrick Carpentier spun in turn four, but avoided damaging their cars. Montoya switched to a back-up car after heavily colliding with the turn-two wall, and Bobby Labonte did the same after he lost control in turn four and damaged his left-rear quarter. Kahne made light contact with the turn-four wall, and the car was repaired by his team.

Forty-seven drivers entered qualifying on Friday afternoon. Due to NASCAR's qualifying procedure, 43 could race. Each driver ran two laps, with the starting order determined by the competitors' fastest times. Drivers who recorded their lap times early in the session were at an advantage because the track was cooler, and thus the air was more dense and the track gave more grip. Edwards felt his car had oversteer during his run. Kyle Busch won the third pole position of his career with a time of 29.613 seconds. He was joined on the grid's front row by Edwards, who was 0.125 seconds slower and had the pole position until Kyle Busch's lap. Martin qualified third, Gordon fourth, and Mike Skinner fifth. Biffle, Scott Riggs, Earnhardt, Kurt Busch, and Sadler completed the top-10 qualifiers. The four drivers who failed to qualify were A. J. Allmendinger, Joe Nemechek, John Andretti, and Sauter (who crashed at turn two on his first qualifying lap). Burney Lamar withdrew from the race prior to qualifying. After the qualifier, Busch said his team was aware of the car's potential, which was displayed in Friday's sole practice session and the January test session; he was worried about his vehicle being very tight going into the first and second turns, having been on the accelerator pedal throughout his fastest lap.

On Saturday afternoon, Matt Kenseth was fastest in the second practice session with a time of 30.321 seconds, ahead of Clint Bowyer, Earnhardt, Travis Kvapil, David Gilliland, Biffle, Johnson, Newman, Hornish, and Edwards. Kyle Busch scraped the outside wall while driving up the track; he sustained minor damage and did not switch to a back-up car. Later that day, Kahne led the final practice session with a time of 30.580 seconds; Edwards, Paul Menard, Gordon, his Hendrick Motorsports teammates Johnson and Earnhardt, Reutimann, Biffle, Bowyer, and Dave Blaney occupied positions two through 10. Bowyer moved to the outside of the track, but was unable to steer left and hit the outside wall leaving turn two and into the backstretch; he came down the track and Kyle Petty hit Bowyer and damaged his front-left fender before Bowyer's car stopped after he made contact with the inside wall. Bowyer was required to use a back-up car, but Petty was able to repair his chassis.

=== Qualifying results ===
Grid	Car	Driver	Team	Manufacturer	Time	Speed
1	18	Kyle Busch	Joe Gibbs Racing	Toyota	29.613	182.352
2	99	Carl Edwards	Roush Fenway Racing	Ford	29.738	181.586
3	8	Mark Martin	Dale Earnhardt, Inc.	Chevrolet	29.786	181.293
4	24	Jeff Gordon	Hendrick Motorsports	Chevrolet	29.795	181.238
5	27	Mike Skinner	Bill Davis Racing	Toyota	29.815	181.117
6	16	Greg Biffle	Roush Fenway Racing	Ford	29.817	181.105
7	66	Scott Riggs	Haas CNC Racing	Chevrolet	29.856	180.868
8	88	Dale Earnhardt Jr.	Hendrick Motorsports	Chevrolet	29.861	180.838
9	2	Kurt Busch	Penske Racing South	Dodge	29.871	180.777
10	19	Elliott Sadler	Gillett Evernham Motorsports	Dodge	29.881	180.717
11	5	Casey Mears	Hendrick Motorsports	Chevrolet	29.891	180.656
12	10	Patrick Carpentier	Gillett Evernham Motorsports	Dodge	29.899	180.608
13	17	Matt Kenseth	Roush Fenway Racing	Dodge	29.922	180.469
14	00	David Reutimann	Michael Waltrip Racing	Toyota	29.937	180.379
15	12	Ryan Newman	Penske Racing South	Dodge	29.941	180.355
16	44	Dale Jarrett	Michael Waltrip Racing	Toyota	29.955	180.270
17	29	Kevin Harvick	Richard Childress Racing	Chevrolet	29.960	180.240
18	1	Martin Truex Jr.	Dale Earnhardt, Inc.	Chevrolet	29.961	180.234
19	49	Ken Schrader	BAM Racing	Dodge	30.001	179.994
20	77	Sam Hornish Jr.	Penske Racing South	Dodge	30.007	179.958
21	07	Clint Bowyer	Richard Childress Racing	Chevrolet	30.011	179.934^{1}
22	55	Michael Waltrip	Michael Waltrip Racing	Toyota	30.023	179.862
23	70	Jeremy Mayfield	Haas CNC Racing	Chevrolet	30.030	179.820
24	31	Jeff Burton	Richard Childress Racing	Chevrolet	30.034	179.976
25	20	Tony Stewart	Joe Gibbs Racing	Toyota	30.071	179.575
26	22	Dave Blaney	Bill Davis Racing	Toyota	30.108	179.354
27	11	Denny Hamlin	Joe Gibbs Racing	Toyota	30.123	179.265
28	01	Regan Smith	Dale Earnhardt, Inc.	Chevrolet	30.124	179.259
29	28	Travis Kvapil	Yates Racing	Ford	30.132	179.211
30	96	J. J. Yeley	Hall of Fame Racing	Toyota	30.140	179.164
31	42	Juan Pablo Montoya	Chip Ganassi Racing	Dodge	30.167	179.003
32	7	Robby Gordon	Robby Gordon Motorsports	Dodge	30.169	178.992
33	48	Jimmie Johnson	Hendrick Motorsports	Chevrolet	30.177	178.944
34	38	David Gilliland	Yates Racing	Ford	30.258	178.465
35	41	Reed Sorenson	Chip Ganassi Racing	Dodge	30.271	178.389
36	26	Jamie McMurray	Roush Fenway Racing	Ford	30.278	178.347
37	9	Kasey Kahne	Gillett Evernham Motorsports	Dodge	30.281	178.330^{1}
38	6	David Ragan	Roush Fenway Racing	Ford	30.284	178.312
39	43	Bobby Labonte	Petty Enterprises	Dodge	30.291	178.271
40	15	Paul Menard	Dale Earnhardt, Inc.	Chevrolet	30.352	177.913
41	45	Kyle Petty	Petty Enterprises	Dodge	30.433	177.439
42	40	Dario Franchitti	Chip Ganassi Racing	Dodge	30.472	177.212
43	83	Brian Vickers	Red Bull Racing Team	Toyota	30.029	179.826
Failed to qualify
44	84	A. J. Allmendinger	Red Bull Racing Team	Toyota	30.174	178.962
45	78	Joe Nemechek	Furniture Row Racing	Chevrolet	30.451	177.334
46	34	John Andretti	Front Row Motorsports	Chevrolet	117.513	45.952
47	21	Johnny Sauter	Wood Brothers Racing	Ford	–	–
^{1} Moved to the back of the grid for changing engines (#9) and for going to a backup car (#07)

== Race ==
Live television coverage of the race began at 3:30 pm EST in the United States on Fox. Around the start of the race, weather conditions were sunny, between 54 and 64 °F (12 and 18 °C), and no rain was expected. Gusty winds from the north created strong headwinds on the back straight. Kenny Farmer, chaplain of Las Vegas Motor Speedway, began prerace ceremonies with an invocation. Actress Carol Linnea Johnson of the stage production Mamma Mia! performed the national anthem, and John Byers, co-director of UAW-Chrysler National Training Center, commanded the drivers to start their engines. During the pace laps, two drivers moved to the rear of the field because of unapproved changes: Bowyer had switched to a back-up car, and Kahne had changed his engine.

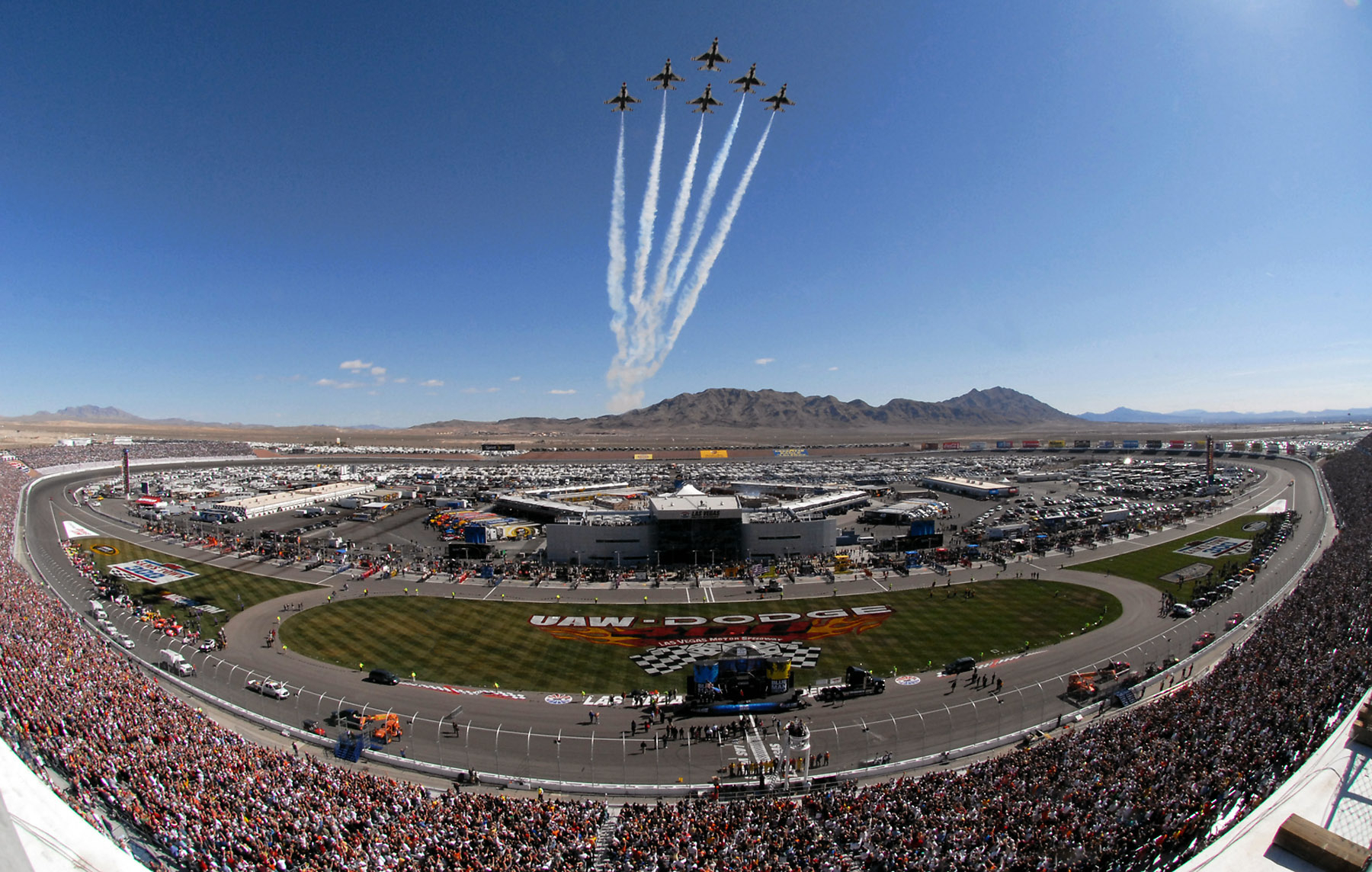
Military flyover by the United States Air Force Thunderbirds before the start of the race

The race started at 4:48 pm; Kyle Busch maintained his pole position advantage heading into the first corner and led the field on the first lap. Carpentier went up the track on the same lap, but avoided hitting the barriers, while Reutimann did the same and scraped the outside wall, causing right-rear damage to his car. He was black-flagged by NASCAR because debris was dangling from his vehicle. Reutimann's right-rear tire exploded while entering the pit road on lap 5, but no debris was left on the track. On lap 9, Bowyer hit the wall, causing Kahne to drive down the track. He also made contact with Jamie McMurray, who slid through the infield frontstretch grass, causing the first caution flag and the appearance of the pace car. During the caution, most drivers elected to make pit stops for tires, and 18 drivers remained on the track.

Kyle Busch stayed out and led the field back up to speed on the lap 13 restart. Three laps later, Edwards started to challenge Kyle Busch for the lead. Jeff Gordon moved up to third on lap 18, and Martin moved from third to eighth by the same lap. Kyle Busch and Edwards ran alongside each other in the battle for the first position on lap 20; the battle concluded after Edwards passed Kyle Busch on the following lap. Gordon was passed by Biffle for third place on lap 22, while Kurt Busch moved up to fifth on the same lap. By lap 28, Biffle had closed the gap to Kyle Busch and passed him for second position two laps later. Edwards had a 1.3-second lead over teammate Biffle on the same lap. Kyle Busch fell to fourth place after Gordon passed him on the 33rd lap. Kyle Busch reclaimed the third position from Gordon two laps later; Kurt Busch had moved into third after moving ahead of Gordon on the same lap. By the 42nd lap, Edwards and teammate Biffle had opened a 3.0-second lead over Kyle Busch. Riggs and Kurt Busch both moved in front of Kyle Busch for third and fourth positions on lap 45.

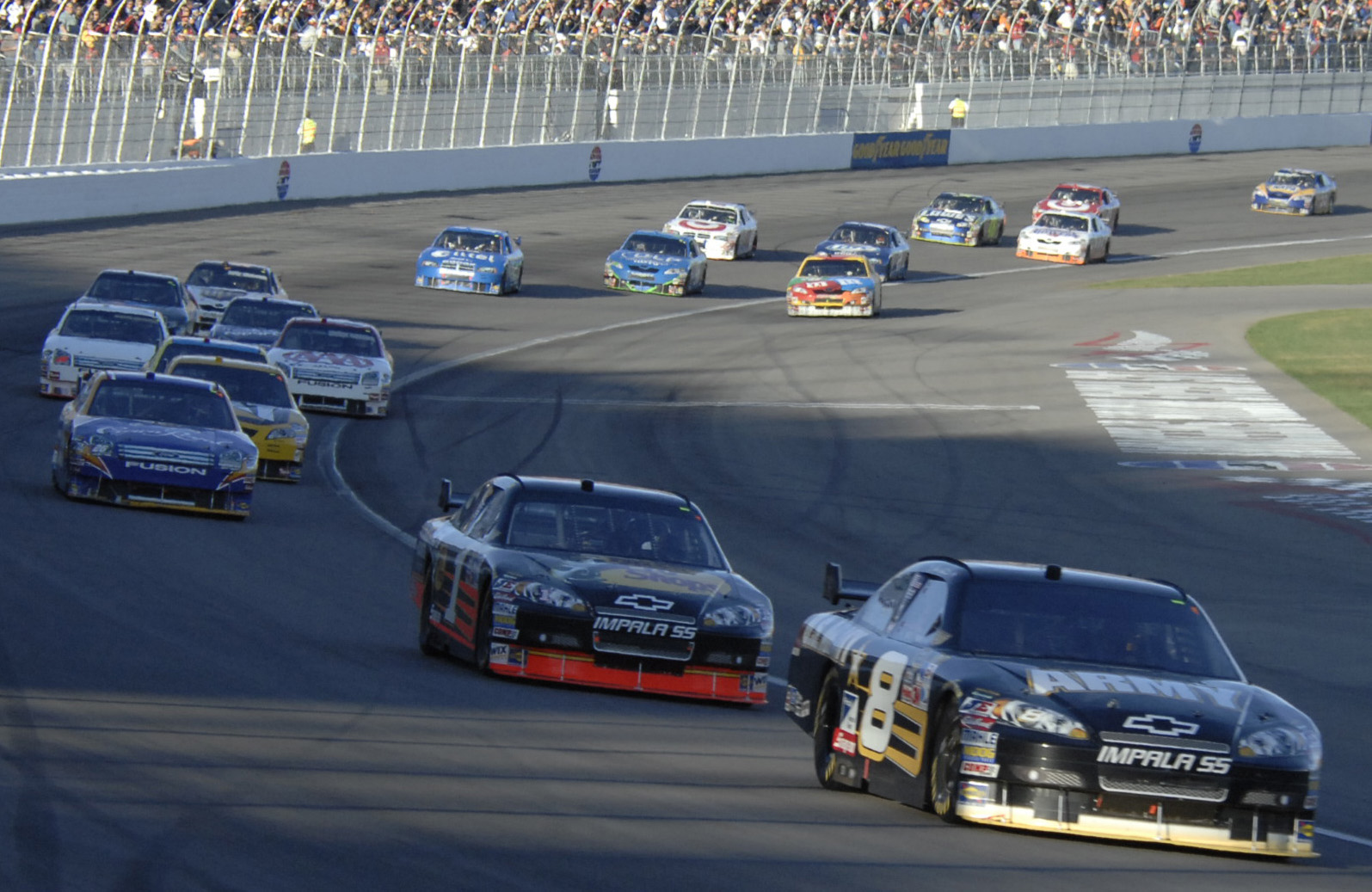
Mark Martin led the field for one lap.

Green-flag pit stops began on lap 48. Edwards and Biffle made pit stops on lap 49, handing the lead to Riggs. Hornish hit the turn-two outside wall on the following lap after his right-front tire went down in the trioval, and sustained damage to his right-front quarter panel, but no debris came off his car. After the pit stops, Edwards regained the lead and held a 5.0-second lead over Kyle Busch; Martin moved into third place, Riggs regained fourth place, and Harvick moved up to fifth place by lap 65. Four laps later, a second caution was needed when debris was spotted at turn two. Most of the leaders, including Edwards, made pit stops. Jeff Burton chose to remain on the track and led on the lap-76 restart, ahead of Earnhardt and Kyle Busch. On lap 78, Kyle Busch moved ahead of Earnhardt to take second place, and began to close the gap to Burton. Kyle Busch passed Burton to reclaim the lead three laps later, and opened up a 1.3-second advantage over Burton by the 92nd lap. Earnhardt was passed by Edwards for fifth place on lap 94, and Biffle got ahead of Gordon for seventh on the same lap. Edwards gained fourth place when he passed Stewart on the 96th lap, and Burton lost second to Kenseth two laps later. On lap 102, Burton fell to fourth place after Edwards passed him.

By lap 105, Kyle Busch held a 3.1-second lead over Kenseth. Four laps later, the third caution was triggered when Stewart's car made heavy contact with the turn-two wall after his right-front tire burst. Stewart grazed his foot and climbed out of his car; emergency workers helped take him to a waiting car, which took him to the infield medical center for further examination. All the leaders, including Edwards, chose to make pit stops for tires and adjustments under caution. NASCAR required Edwards to fall back to the end of the longest line because one of his crew members had allowed a tire to roll away from the pit box. Kyle Busch maintained the lead at the restart on lap 115; he was followed by Kenseth and Gordon. Kenseth passed Kyle Busch to take the lead on lap 116. On the next lap, Gordon passed Busch. By lap 135, Kenseth had opened up a 2.2-second lead over Gordon. Biffle moved in front of Burton for fourth place on the 139th lap. On lap 144, Robby Gordon's right-front tire blew, causing him to hit the turn-two wall, and the fourth caution was triggered. All the leaders made pit stops during the caution.

Kenseth remained the leader at the lap-150 restart; he was followed by Gordon. The fifth caution was deployed 12 laps later, when Carpentier was squeezed towards the backstretch outside wall by Newman, causing Carpentier to slide down the track and hit the inside wall. Ken Schrader was close by the incident, but swerved to avoid damaging his car. During the caution, the leading drivers, including Kenseth, elected to make pit stops for tires. Gordon took the lead and maintained it at the lap-166 restart. Biffle and his teammate Kenseth drove alongside each other in a battle for second place on lap 166, until Biffle escaped and ran onto the apron on the next lap. Mayfield burst his right-front tire on lap 171, but no debris came off his car, avoiding the need for a caution. Six laps later, Biffle passed Kyle Busch to take fifth place. Riggs experienced oversteer in the fourth turn while running down the inside of Labonte; Franchitti ran into Riggs, causing the sixth caution on lap 179. All the leaders, including Kenseth, elected to make pit stops for tires. Earnhardt led the field on the lap-184 restart; he was followed by Harvick and Edwards. Gordon moved into fifth place by lap 188. Harvick fell to fourth place when Edwards and Kenseth passed him.

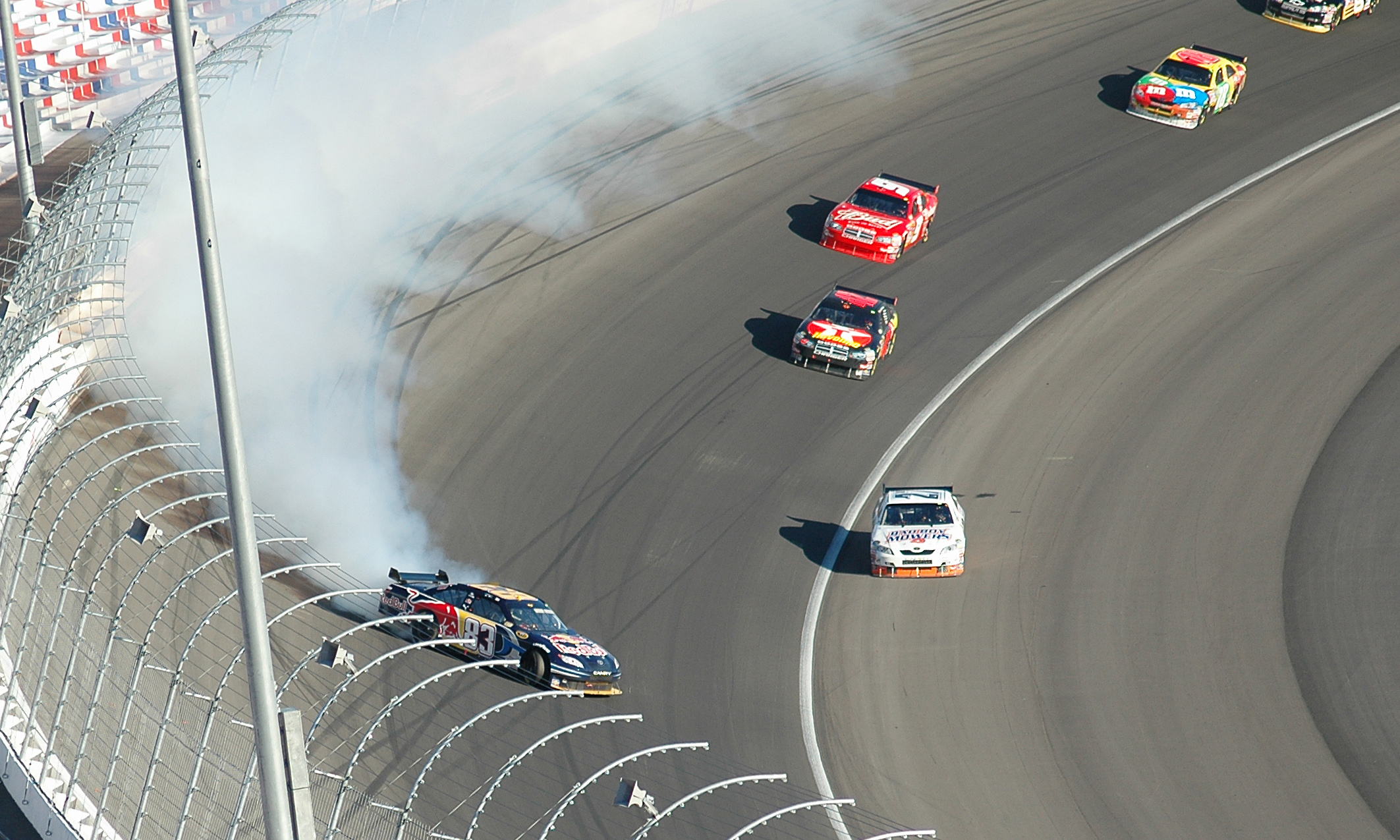
Brian Vickers spun around after he was hit by Casey Mears.

Edwards passed Earnhardt to reclaim the lead on lap 195, while Earnhardt lost a further position after Kenseth got ahead of him on the same lap. Ten laps later, Biffle moved ahead of Harvick to take fifth place, while his teammate Kenseth had a 1.5-second lead over the second-place Edwards by the 211th lap. Three laps later, the seventh caution was issued when officials located debris in the turn-two groove. The leaders, including Edwards, chose to make pit stops for tires and car adjustments. One tire from Edwards's car went outside his pit box, but he was not penalized because a cameraman blocked Edwards's crew from retrieving the tire. Kenseth led the field back up to speed on the lap-220 restart; Earnhardt was in second place and Edwards third. Casey Mears hit Vickers, who spun and triggered the eighth caution on lap 224; both drivers avoided contacting the wall. Kenseth maintained the lead on the lap-228 restart. Edwards drove up the track in an attempt to take the lead on lap 229, but Kenseth kept the position. Four laps later, the ninth caution was needed when Dale Jarrett spun and hit the turn-two outside wall. Kenseth remained the leader at the restart on lap 237. Edwards passed teammate Kenseth for the lead two laps later, and began to pull away. Earnhardt caught up to Kenseth by lap 243, and 10 laps later, he passed Kenseth for second.

Kurt Busch's right-front tire exploded, causing him to hit the wall between turns three and four, and the 10th caution happened on lap 257. Kurt Busch retired from the race because of his crash. He was transported to the infield medical center for a mandatory check-up. Edwards remained in the lead for the lap-263 restart. Earnhardt spun his tires, forcing Kenseth onto the outside lane and Gordon to the inside, where he passed Earnhardt. Kenseth moved in front of Earnhardt and then made contact with Gordon, who was sent into the inside backstretch retaining wall, which had no SAFER barrier installed. Gordon's car's radiator flew out from its chassis and into the path of oncoming traffic. Kenseth slid, but was able to straighten his car and continue. The final caution was initially waved before a red flag was shown, stopping the race to allow officials to remove debris from the track. The race resumed 17 minutes later, with Edwards leading Earnhardt and Biffle. Edwards maintained the lead for the remaining two laps to secure his second consecutive win and the ninth of his career. Earnhardt finished second, ahead of Biffle in third, Harvick fourth, and Burton fifth. Ragan, Kahne, Kvapil, Hamlin, and Martin rounded out the top-10 finishers. The race had 11 cautions and 19 lead changes among 9 drivers. Edwards led four times for a total of 86 laps, more than any other competitor.

=== Postrace comments ===
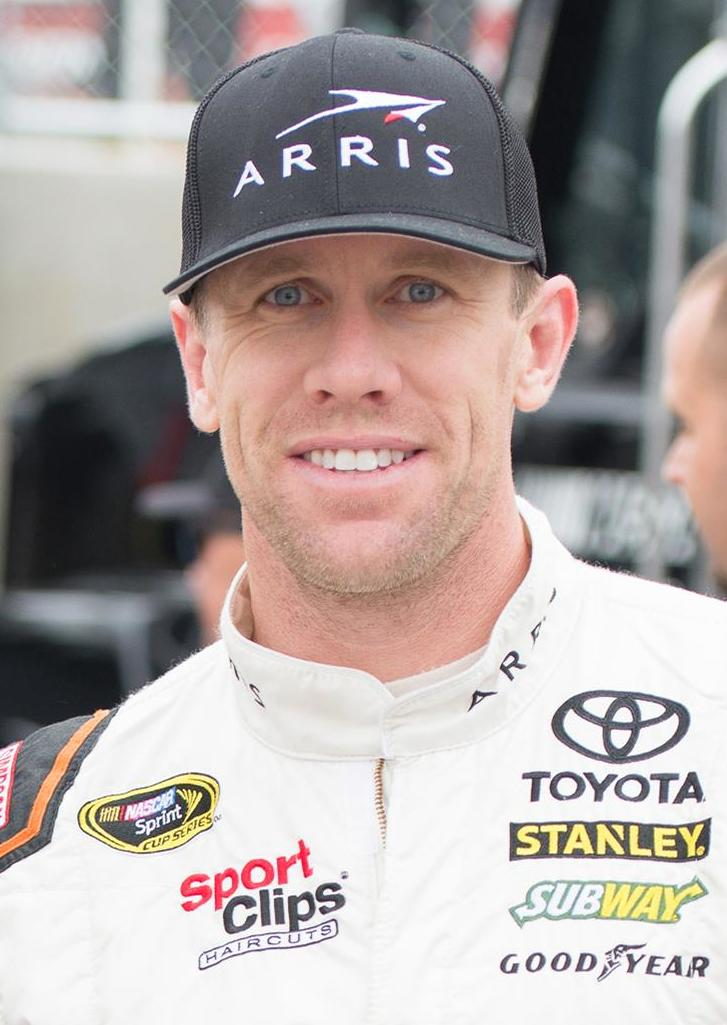
Carl Edwards won the race.

Edwards appeared in Victory Lane in front of the crowd of 153,000 people to celebrate his second victory of the season, earning him $425,675. He was pleased with the result, saying it was "a very special win" and that he felt he was close to the form he had achieved in 2005: "I tried hard to stay calm. And I'm not the best at it sometimes. We all know that." He added, "We do this to win. Winning these races is the greatest. Winning a championship would be the ultimate. What we’re trying to do is win the championship this year. That's our number-one goal." Second-place finisher Earnhardt was disappointed, saying he had his car in his chosen position, but the red-flag period prevented him from winning the race: "Carl wasn't going to get beat today. He had it in the bag. He was so strong ... I was terrible on cold tires. I wish all of you knew what that felt like. I hate it." Biffle was philosophical as he argued that he had the fastest car, but did not gain the track position he needed to challenge Edwards because he slid on pit road.

Despite his injury, Stewart said he hoped to participate in a planned two-day test session at Phoenix International Raceway. He also said he was worried about his crash because his legs and hips were tingling and his lower back was in pain. Stewart said the crash scared him and the tingling in his legs had improved after leaving the infield care center. Kurt Busch's crew chief Pat Tryson said the Penske Racing South team and he were relieved the driver emerged uninjured after his crash on lap 256, and that they would do better at the next weekend's race. Gordon said his crash on lap 264 was "probably the hardest hit I've ever taken" and admitted fault for causing the crash. According to Kenseth, "I knew he was going to get a run on me, so I laid back a little bit ... We came off [turn] 2 and I was up as high as I thought I could, and Jeff just came across. Whether it was on purpose or not, it just kind of wiped us out." Gordon said he hoped Speedway Motorsports chairman and chief executive Bruton Smith (the owner of Las Vegas Motor Speedway) would install SAFER barriers along the inside retaining walls around the track. Biffle said the circuit barriers should not have had gaps, and that all NASCAR tracks should have SAFER barriers installed. After consulting NASCAR officials, construction crews installed a 1,700-foot (520 m) long SAFER barrier along the inside backstretch wall in August 2008.

After the race, NASCAR announced it had found a problem with the lid on the oil reservoir encasement during a postrace inspection on Edwards's car, which was later taken to the NASCAR Research and Development Center in Concord, North Carolina, for further analysis. Three days after the race, Roush Fenway Racing was given penalties for "actions detrimental to stock car racing", "car, car parts, components and/or equipment used do not conform to NASCAR rules", and a device or duct work that permitted air to pass through the car from one area of the interior of the car to another, or to the outside of the car. The penalties included a $100,000 fine and a six-race suspension for Edwards's crew chief Bob Osborne, who was suspended from NASCAR until April 30, 2008, and placed on probation until December 31, 2008. Roush Fenway Racing chief engineer Chris Andrews took over Osborne's role at the next race weekend. Edwards and car owner Jack Roush incurred the loss of 100 driver and owner points. If Edwards qualified for the Chase for the Sprint Cup, he would not receive 10 bonus points awarded to him for winning the race, which was used to determine the seeding order. Edwards was allowed to keep the victory; he moved from first to seventh in the Drivers' Championship. On March 12, Roush Fenway Racing announced it would not appeal the penalties.

Roush Fenway Racing president Geoff Smith said a bolt that held the oil lid together did not work because of vibration harmonics generated by Edwards's car and the Las Vegas race track. Edwards said the infraction was "an absolute mistake" and that his team had no intention of cheating. Edwards's teammate Biffle and Newman agreed the penalties were justified. According to Sadler, the penalties were not severe enough; he argued that the driver should be penalized or required to miss one event. Toyota Racing Development general manager Lee White said Roush Fenway Racing had modified Edwards's car to enhance downforce by 240 lb (110 kg), which increased the car's horsepower leaving the corners. Roush felt White's comments were motivated by results. White later issued a statement in which he apologized for his comments. An internal investigation found no evidence another person had intentionally caused the bolt to come loose, and that the team enacted protective measures to ensure the oil lid would stay fastened in future events.

The result meant Kyle Busch maintained his lead in the Drivers' Championship, 20 points ahead of Newman in second place. Kahne's seventh-place finish allowed him to advance into third place, 16 points in front of Harvick, who also moved up three positions. Biffle was in fifth at 427 points. Burton, Edwards, Truex, Sadler, Earnhardt, Stewart, and Kurt Busch rounded out the top 12. Ford moved into the lead of the Manufacturers' Championship, five points ahead of Dodge. Chevrolet moved three points clear of Toyota. The event had a television audience of 12.1 million viewers; it took 3:08:08 to complete the race, and the margin of victory was 0.504 seconds.

=== Race results ===
Pos	Grid	Car	Driver	Team	Manufacturer	Laps run	Points
1	2	99	Carl Edwards	Roush Fenway Racing	Ford	267	95^{2, 3}
2	8	88	Dale Earnhardt Jr.	Hendrick Motorsports	Chevrolet	267	175^{1}
3	6	16	Greg Biffle	Roush Fenway Racing	Ford	267	165
4	17	29	Kevin Harvick	Richard Childress Racing	Chevrolet	267	160
5	24	31	Jeff Burton	Richard Childress Racing	Chevrolet	267	160^{1}
6	37	9	Kasey Kahne	Gillett Evernham Motorsports	Dodge	267	150
7	38	6	David Ragan	Roush Fenway Racing	Ford	267	146
8	29	28	Travis Kvapil	Yates Racing	Ford	267	142
9	27	11	Denny Hamlin	Joe Gibbs Racing	Toyota	267	138
10	3	8	Mark Martin	Dale Earnhardt, Inc.	Chevrolet	267	139^{1}
11	1	18	Kyle Busch	Joe Gibbs Racing	Toyota	267	135^{1}
12	10	19	Elliott Sadler	Gillett Evernham Motorsports	Dodge	267	127
13	11	5	Casey Mears	Hendrick Motorsports	Chevrolet	267	124
14	15	12	Ryan Newman	Penske Racing South	Dodge	267	121
15	18	1	Martin Truex Jr.	Dale Earnhardt, Inc.	Chevrolet	267	118
16	23	70	Jeremy Mayfield	Haas CNC Racing	Chevrolet	267	115
17	39	43	Bobby Labonte	Petty Enterprises	Dodge	267	112
18	35	41	Reed Sorenson	Chip Ganassi Racing	Dodge	267	109
19	31	42	Juan Pablo Montoya	Chip Ganassi Racing	Dodge	267	106
20	13	17	Matt Kenseth	Roush Fenway Racing	Ford	267	108^{1}
21	19	49	Ken Schrader	BAM Racing	Dodge	266	100
22	40	15	Paul Menard	Dale Earnhardt, Inc.	Chevrolet	266	97
23	34	38	David Gilliland	Yates Racing	Ford	266	94
24	43	83	Brian Vickers	Red Bull Racing Team	Toyota	266	91
25	36	26	Jamie McMurray	Roush Fenway Racing	Ford	266	88
26	26	22	Dave Blaney	Bill Davis Racing	Toyota	266	85
27	30	96	J. J. Yeley	Hall of Fame Racing	Toyota	266	82
28	21	07	Clint Bowyer	Richard Childress Racing	Chevrolet	265	79
29	33	48	Jimmie Johnson	Hendrick Motorsports	Chevrolet	265	76
30	5	27	Mike Skinner	Bill Davis Racing	Toyota	265	73
31	22	55	Michael Waltrip	Michael Waltrip Racing	Toyota	265	70
32	41	45	Kyle Petty	Petty Enterprises	Dodge	265	67
33	42	40	Dario Franchitti	Chip Ganassi Racing	Dodge	265	64
34	28	01	Regan Smith	Dale Earnhardt, Inc.	Chevrolet	264	61
35	4	24	Jeff Gordon	Hendrick Motorsports	Chevrolet	262	63
36	7	66	Scott Riggs	Haas CNC Racing	Chevrolet	260	60^{1}
37	14	00	David Reutimann	Michael Waltrip Racing	Toyota	258	52
38	9	2	Kurt Busch	Penske Racing South	Dodge	255	49
39	16	44	Dale Jarrett	Michael Waltrip Racing	Toyota	231	46
40	12	10	Patrick Carpentier	Gillett Evernham Motorsports	Dodge	182	43
41	20	77	Sam Hornish Jr.	Penske Racing South	Dodge	152	40
42	32	7	Robby Gordon	Robby Gordon Motorsports	Dodge	142	37
43	25	20	Tony Stewart	Joe Gibbs Racing	Toyota	107	39^{1}
^{1} Includes five bonus points for leading a lap
^{2} Includes 10 bonus points for leading the most laps
^{3} Includes a 100-point penalty for a postrace infraction

== Standings after the race ==
Drivers' Championship standings
Pos	+/–	Driver	Points
1		Kyle Busch	470
2		Ryan Newman	450 (−20)
3	3	Kasey Kahne	444 (−26)
4	3	Kevin Harvick	428 (−42)
5	4	Greg Biffle	427 (−43)
6	4	Jeff Burton	421 (−49)
7	2	Carl Edwards	391 (−79)
8	4	Martin Truex Jr.	371 (−99)
9	4	Elliott Sadler	368 (−102)
10	13	Dale Earnhardt Jr.	361 (−109)
11	8	Tony Stewart	355 (−115)
12	8	Kurt Busch	348 (−122)

Manufacturers' Championship standings
Pos	+/–	Manufacturer	Points
1		Ford	21
2		Dodge	16 (−5)
3		Chevrolet	16 (−5)
4		Toyota	13 (−8)

- Note: Only the top-12 positions are included for the driver standings.

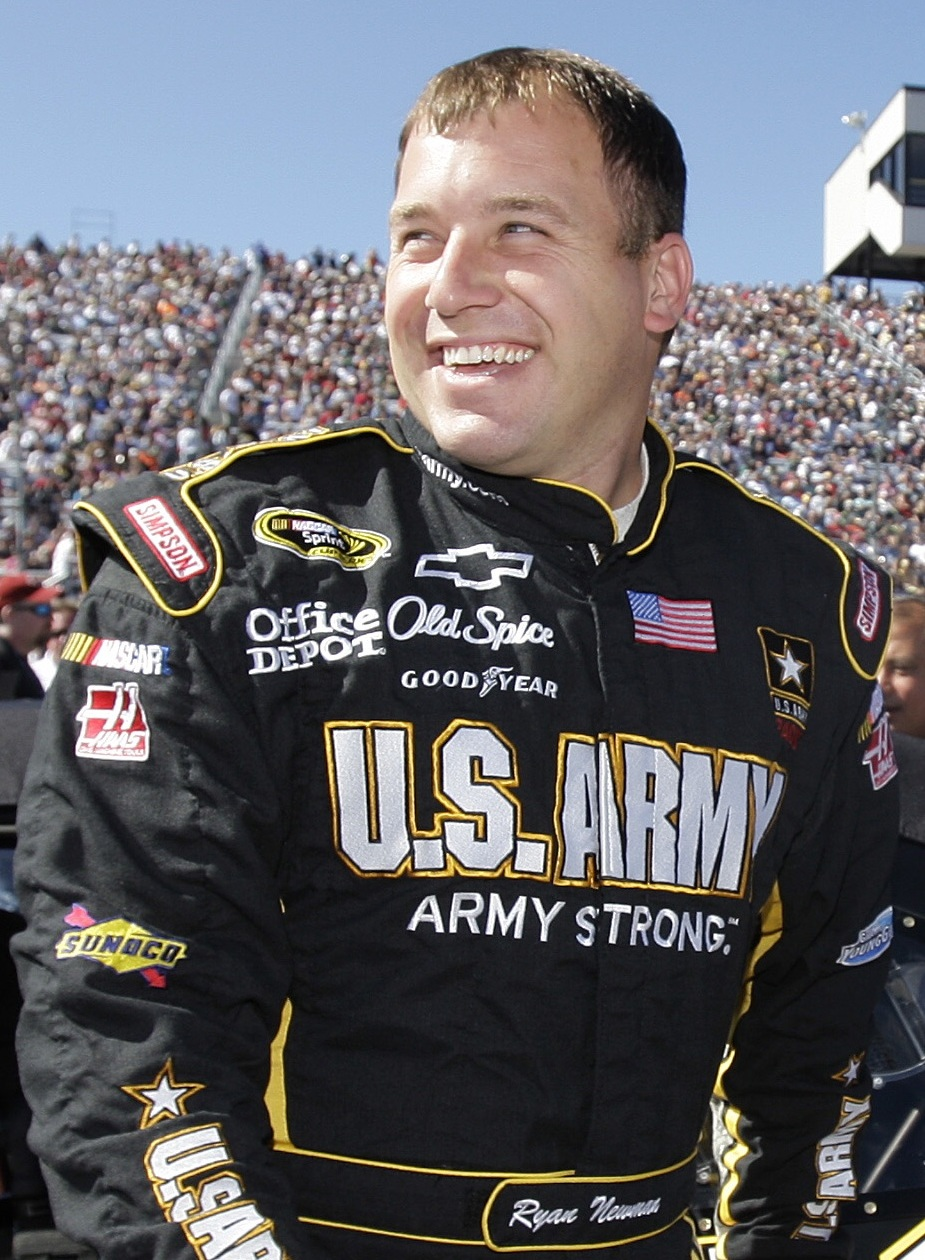
Ryan Newman (pictured in 2009) maintained second position in the Drivers' Championship.

Previous race: 2008 Auto Club 500	Sprint Cup Series; 2008 season	Next race: 2008 Kobalt Tools 500
