= Michigan Motor Sports Hall of Fame =

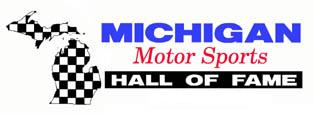

- Location within Michigan
- Established: 1982
- Location: Gilmore Car Museum in Hickory Corners
- Coordinates: 42.4405°N 85.4216°W
- Type: Hall of Fame
- President: Dan VanKoevering

The Michigan Motor Sports Hall of Fame is a non-profit hall of fame for Michigan auto racers.

It was founded in 1982 by Dick Lee and was incorporated April 19, 1982, as a non-profit 501(c) (3) non-stock Michigan corporation.

The Michigan Motor Sports Hall of Fame display is currently located at the Gilmore Car Museum in Hickory Corners. It is in conjunction with their "History of Stock Car Racing" display.

The Michigan Motor Sports Hall of Fame exhibit was located at the R. E. Olds Transportation Museum in Lansing from 1994 thru 2006.

== Mission statement ==
The initiation of the Michigan Motor Sports Hall of Fame was to:

- Preserve the history of all types of motor racing in the state of Michigan, and make this history available to the public.
- Recognize and pay tribute to those citizens of Michigan who have given of themselves, whatever their roles in racing may have been.
- Enshrine and acknowledge the deeds of those people that excelled in motor sports.
- Have a permanent museum where the public can examine motor sports racing memorabilia and recognize those who have been enshrined.

== Organization ==
Michigan Motor Sports Hall of Fame is governed by a Board of Directors, President, Vice President, Treasurer, Corresponding Secretary coupled with several Standing Committees.

== Board members ==
- Marty Blume - Rives Junction, MI
- Roger Britt - Augres, MI
- Allan E. Brown - Comstock, MI (Treasurer)
- Rose Calabrase - Lansing, MI
- Dan Crawford - St. Charles, MI (Vice President)
- Dave DeHam - Harrison Twp., MI
- Terry Fitzwater - Eaton Rapids, MI
- Darcie Fuzi - Gaylord, MI (Secretary)
- Duane Hernly - Lansing, MI
- Tom Hernly - Lansing, MI
- Don Holben - Lansing, MI
- Wayne Landon - Freeport, MI
- Dave Lehman - Hastings, MI
- Jack McCourtie - Jackson, MI
- Barry Meschke - Saginaw, MI
- Jim Pape - Saginaw, MI
- Leo Pego - Mt. Pleasant, MI
- Dan VanKoevering - Grand Rapids, MI (President)

== Biography submittals ==
Bios can be submitted either digitally by email or sent via USPS to the address listed on the Michigan Motor Sports Hall of Fame website

All nominee candidates must have started their racing career 25 years prior to being submitted for consideration. The candidate has to be a past or present legal resident of Michigan, or, if a non-resident, competed the vast majority of their career within the State of Michigan.

The Michigan Motor Sports Hall of Fame Board appreciates and welcomes all legitimate biography submittals.

The voting process involves all living inductees, and all past and present board members. Over 100 persons are eligible for the sealed ballot voting.

== List of inductees ==
* = Deceased A

- * Jim Adema - inducted 1988
- Ricky D. Adkins - inducted 2014
- Jim Aldrich - inducted 1994
- Bruce Allen - inducted 2005
- Fred Alter - inducted 2013
- Steve Ambrose - inducted 2012
- * John Anderson - inducted 2002
- Bob Andrews - inducted 2002
- * Leo Anthony - inducted 2013
- * Reynald Argenta - inducted 2012
- Jerry Arnold - inducted 1998
- * Sam Ash - inducted 1992

B

- Ralph Baker - inducted 1993
- * Ray Baker - inducted 2001
- * Henry Banks - inducted 1982
- * Erv Baumgarten - inducted 2013
- * Ernie Beckman - inducted 2011
- * Dick Beebe - inducted 1985
- * Pat Beebe - inducted 1998
- * Paul Beebe - inducted 1985
- Bob Benner - inducted 2009
- Art Bennett - inducted 1986
- John Benson, Sr. - inducted 1986
- Al Bergler - inducted 2006
- Dennis Berry - inducted 2012
- * Al Blixt, Sr. - inducted 2014
- Jeff Bloom - inducted 2000
- Dave Boertman - inducted 1990
- * Tom Bowles - inducted 2003
- * Bill Boyd - inducted 1989
- Andy Bozell - inducted 2007
- Tony Brabbs - inducted 2010
- * Bob Bracey - inducted 2014
- * Art Braithwaite - inducted 1988
- Lee Brayton - inducted 1998
- * Scott Brayton - inducted 1998
- Vic Brinkman - inducted 2003
- Allan E. Brown - inducted 2011
- Norm Brown - inducted 1987
- * Clifford 'Porky' Burkholder - inducted 2001
- * Bob Burman - inducted 1983
- Danny Byrd - inducted 2003

C

- Jack Calabrase - inducted 1993
- Fred Campbell - inducted 1998
- * Canfield & Johnson - inducted 2005
- Marv Carman - inducted 2011
- Bob Carnes - inducted 1995
- * Dick Carter - inducted 1983
- Neal Carter - inducted 1997
- * Dennis Casteele - inducted 2005
- * Jack Caswell - inducted 1992
- Chevair Racing Team - inducted 1996
- * Louis Chevrolet - inducted 1984
- * Bob Clover - inducted 2001
- Gail Cobb - inducted 1999
- Gene Coleman - inducted 2008
- * Ken Coles - inducted 1987
- Jack Conely - inducted 1987
- Dan Crawford - inducted 2009
- * Jack Cummiford - inducted 1996

D

- Tom D'Eath - inducted 1998
- * Ray Daniels - inducted 2001
- * Bob Davis - inducted 1995
- Dick Decker - inducted 2005
- Dick DeGraw - inducted 2012
- Russ Densmore - inducted 2012
- Tom DeVette - inducted 2013
- *Jack Doering - inducted 1987
- John Doering, Jr. - inducted 2011
- Denny Donaldson - inducted 1997
- Ralph Donaldson - inducted 1987
- Harry Doolittle - inducted 2004
- Joe Dorer - inducted 2006
- Butch Dowker - inducted 2010
- * Max Dowker - inducted 1984
- Ron Drager - inducted 2007
- * Ronnie Duman - inducted 1985
- * Hank Dumon - inducted 1995
- Dick Dunshee - inducted 2013

E

- Tom Earhart - inducted 1990
- Mike Eddy - inducted 1995

F

- Harold Fair, Sr. - inducted 1996
- * Joy Fair - inducted 1986
- Cy Fairchild - inducted 1988
- Butch Fedewa - inducted 1993
- Gary Fedewa - inducted 1992
- Tim Fedewa - inducted 2014
- * Wilson Fedewa - inducted 1982
- * John Fedricks - inducted 1999
- Timothy Felver - inducted 2005
- Bob Finley - inducted 2006
- Doug Finley - inducted 2011
- Jeff Finley - inducted 2010
- Doug Flannery - inducted 2011
- Bob Flinn - inducted 2012
- Ron Flinn - inducted 2007
- Mike Fons - inducted 2006
- Harry Foote, Jr. - inducted 2008
- * Harry Foote, Sr. - inducted 2014
- * Carl Forberg - inducted 1985
- * Henry Ford - inducted 1984
- * Spencer Foreman - inducted 1994
- * Danny Foster - inducted 1999
- * Jim Frankland, Jr. - inducted 1995
- * Louie Freeburn - inducted 1995
- * Vern 'Flip' Fritch - inducted 1982

G

- Chuck Gallagher - inducted 2000
- Mike Garvey - inducted 2005
- Paul Gentilozzi - inducted 1998
- Sam Gianino - inducted 2007
- * Bob Gillelan - inducted 2008
- Mel Gillett - inducted 2006
- Roger Gilligan - inducted 1986
- * Jim Gilmore, Jr. - inducted 1989
- Duane Glasgow - inducted 1996
- Paul Goldsmith - inducted 1986
- Jack Goodwin - inducted 1984
- * Leo Goossen - inducted 1985
- * John Gordenski - inducted 1986
- * Owen Granger, Sr. - inducted 1992
- John Grega - inducted 2003
- John Grivins - inducted 2004

H

- * John Haas - inducted 2010
- Henry A Haigh II - inducted 1997
- * Al Hall - inducted 1996
- Sonny Hall - inducted 2014
- Bill Hanes - inducted 1995
- Bob Hanes - inducted 2007
- * Sam Hanks - inducted 1984
- Dr. Richard Harris - inducted 1997
- * Rondie Harris - inducted 1988
- * Ray Harroun - inducted 2010
- * Bill Heeney, Sr. - inducted 2002
- Kevin Helms - inducted 2013
- Ron Hemelgarn - inducted 2013
- * Gene Henderson - inducted 1989
- Jim Hettinger - inducted 1998
- Team Highland - inducted 1992
- Don Holben - inducted 2007
- Bob Holly - inducted 2013
- * Ronney Householder - inducted 1983
- Chas Howe - inducted 2014
- Ed Howe - inducted 1988
- Jay Howell - inducted 2008
- Bob Huettman - inducted 2012
- * Harvey Hughes - inducted 2008
- * Roger Huntington - inducted 1997

I

- Bob Iverson - inducted 2000

J

- * Jake Jacobson - inducted 1986
- Russ Jacobson - inducted 1990
- Gordon Johncock - inducted 1985
- * Nolan Johncock - inducted 1989
- Danny Johnson - inducted 2006
- * Johnny Johnson - inducted 1989
- * Ed Jones - inducted 1983
- * Harry Jones - inducted 2008
- * Roger Joneson - inducted 1987

K

- Doug Kahl - inducted 1995
- Connie Kalitta - inducted 1986
- Doug Kalitta - inducted 2011
- * Scott Kalitta - inducted 2011
- * Bert Karnatz - inducted 1993
- * Mickey Katlin - inducted 1990
- * Iggy Katona - inducted 1982
- * Ron Keech - inducted 1994
- * Curt Kelley - inducted 2005
- * Rusty Kelley - inducted 2007
- The Keselowski Family - inducted 2004
- * Tom Kestenholtz - inducted 2004
- Bob Kingen - inducted 1993
- * Bob Knight - inducted 1992
- Duane Knoll - inducted 1999
- Todd Krikke - inducted 2006
- Dave Kuhlman - inducted 2006
- * Frank Kulick - inducted 1992

L

- Dick LaHaie - inducted 1993
- Frank Lamp - inducted 2009
- * Jerry Landon - inducted 1991
- Wayne Landon - inducted 1985
- George Lane - inducted 2001
- * Tommy Lane - inducted 1984
- * Jack Layton - inducted 2000
- * Jim & Mary Jo Ledford - inducted 1999
- Dick Lee - inducted 2002
- * Bob Lewis - inducted 1986
- Gary Lindahl - inducted 2004
- * Bud Lindemann - inducted 1991
- * Jack Lindhout - inducted 1994
- * Johnny Logan - inducted 1986
- Eugene Logghe - inducted 2010
- Ronald Logghe - inducted 2010
- Gary Long - inducted 2008
- Vito LoPiccolo - inducted 2006
- Hank Lower - inducted 1996
- Jon W. Lundberg, Sr. - inducted 1997
- * Frank Luptow - inducted 1988

M

- Ken Mackey - inducted 2007
- Tom Maier - inducted 1993
- Jerry Makara - inducted 2011
- * John Marcum - inducted 1982
- * Mildred Marcum - inducted 2000
- * Bart Markel - inducted 1986
- * James 'Hammer' Mason - inducted 1986
- Larry McCloskey - inducted 2002
- * Chuck McClung - inducted 1989
- Jack McCormack - inducted 2000
- Jack McCourtie - inducted 2006
- Don McElroy - inducted 2013
- * Bill McGowan - inducted 2012
- Rod McLean - inducted 1999
- * Harry Melling - inducted 2004
- Paul Mercure - inducted 2003
- Jimmy Meyer - inducted 1998
- * Al Miller - inducted 1990
- Diane Miller - inducted 2010
- Henry 'Butch' Miller - inducted 1997
- Dave Mulder - inducted 2002
- Shirley Muldowney - inducted 1989
- * Bill Muncey - inducted 1995
- * Jimmy Murphy - inducted 1989
- Brian Musselman - inducted 2002
- * Glen A. Myers - inducted 1997
- * Chet Mysliwiec - inducted 1984

N

- Bill Naida - inducted 1987
- John Naida - inducted 1996
- * Duke Nalon - inducted 1986
- * Ray Nece - inducted 1989
- * Jim Nelson - inducted 1989
- * Jack Nichols - inducted 1995
- Tim Norman - inducted 2012

O

- * Harry Obie - inducted 1995
- * Barney Oldfield - inducted 1985
- Bill Owen - inducted 2009

P

- Scott Parker - inducted 2004
- Ray Paquet - inducted 2010
- * Benny Parsons - inducted 1988
- Pat Patrick - inducted 1990
- Bob Patterson - inducted 1999
- Kris Patterson - inducted 2000
- Marv Parenteau - inducted 2014
- Leo Pego - inducted 2008
- * Neil Penny - inducted 2004
- Roger Penske - inducted 1994
- * Marvin Pifer, Sr. - inducted 1984
- * Setto Postoian - inducted 1997
- * E.J. Potter - inducted 1992
- * Norm Power - inducted 1986
- * Hod Preston - inducted 1987
- Al Provoast - inducted 2001

Q R

- The Ramchargers - inducted 1996
- Benny Rapp - inducted 1991
- Bill Reichert - inducted 2002
- Dewey Rethman - inducted 2009
- * Harold Reynolds - inducted 2005
- * Charles Rhodes - inducted 1989
- Kim (LaHaie) Richards - inducted 2014
- * Johnny Ritter - inducted 1989
- Donnie Roberts - inducted 2005
- * Jimmy Roberts - inducted 1999
- * Johnny Roberts - inducted 1983
- * Lyle Roberts - inducted 1999
- * Glen Rockey - inducted 1987
- * Ray Rogers - inducted 1992
- * Mauri Rose - inducted 1982
- * "Wild" Willie Rose - inducted 2013
- The Ross Brothers - inducted 2008
- Dick Ross - inducted 1987
- Chuck Roumell - inducted 2014
- Jack Roush - inducted 1992
- Rock Running - inducted 2002
- Maynard Rupp, Jr. - inducted 2001
- Norm Rust - inducted 2000
- * Marion 'Babe' Ruth - inducted 1992
- Joe Ruttman - inducted 1989
- * Troy Ruttman - inducted 1982

S

- * Eddie Sachs - inducted 1991
- Wally Sanders - inducted 2000
- Steve Sauve - inducted 2003
- * Sam Sayer - inducted 1991
- * Carl Scarborough - inducted 1985
- * J.Lee Schoenith - inducted 2000
- * Mick Schuler - inducted 2000
- Karl Schwartz - inducted 2012
- Frank Seder - inducted 2008
- Bob Seelman, Sr. - inducted 1990
- Bob Seibert - inducted 2002
- Bob Senneker - inducted 1988
- * Rich Senneker - inducted 2000
- * Sammy Sessions - inducted 1982
- Larry Shepard - inducted 2009
- * John Shipman - inducted 1994
- * Joan Simmons - inducted 2011
- 'Lil Richard Simmons - inducted 1993
- * Al Singer - inducted 1985
- Odie Skeen - inducted 2014
- Dick Slade - inducted 2001
- Jim Slade - inducted 2010
- * Doc Smalley - inducted 2006
- * Bob Snelenberger - inducted 1988
- * Russ Snowberger - inducted 1990
- Bob Snyder - inducted 2003
- Artie Sommers - inducted 2007
- Jay Springsteen - inducted 1993
- * Clare Stader - inducted 1983
- Tim Steele - inducted 2009
- * Elmer Stevens - inducted 1994
- * Buddy Stewart - inducted 2001
- Rick Stout - inducted 2009
- Tom Straley - inducted 2007
- Bob Studt - inducted 2001
- * Donnell Sullivan - inducted 1986
- Randy Sweet - inducted 1997

T

- Mark Tate - inducted 2005
- Don Taylor - inducted 1993
- Dutch Taylor - inducted 2006
- * John Tenney - inducted 2004
- Jim Terill - inducted 2012
- Mason Thomas - inducted 1985
- LeRoy Throop - inducted 2003
- Bill Tyler - inducted 2001
- Brian Tyler - inducted 2007

U

- * Emil Ujlaky - inducted 1993

V

- The Vakula Family - inducted 2012
- Bruce VanderLaan - inducted 2004
- * Eddie VanderLaan - inducted 1993
- * Gordy VanderLaan - inducted 1986
- * Bill VandeWater - inducted 1987
- * Ed & Carmen VanDuinen - inducted 2010
- * Charley Voelker - inducted 1982
- Donald R Voisin - inducted 2009

W

- * Bill Waddill - inducted 1991
- * Nelson Ward - inducted 1984
- Mark Weber - inducted 2014
- Pete Webster - inducted 1988
- * Lew Welch - inducted 1982
- Ben & Dave Wenzel - inducted 2000
- Chris White - inducted 1996
- * Chuck White - inducted 1989
- * Johnny White - inducted 1985
- Bill Whittington - inducted 2005
- * Willie Wik - inducted 1998
- * Les Williams - inducted 1994
- * Bill Wiltse - inducted 1985
- Roger Wing - inducted 2004
- * Johnny Wohlfeil, Sr. - inducted 1984
- * Gar Wood - inducted 1990
- * Vicki Wood - inducted 2019
- Della Woods - inducted 1999
- Jay Woolworth - inducted 2003

X Y

- * Stan Yee, Sr. - inducted 2009

Z

- * Eddie Zalucki, Sr. - inducted 1984
- * Carson Zeiter - inducted 1984
- * Dick Zimmerman - inducted 1987
- * Paul Zimmerman - inducted 2002
