= Hod Preston =

American automobile racer (1917–1995)

- Nationality: American
- Born: 1917
- Died: 1995 (aged 77–78)

Awards
- Michigan Motor Sports Hall of Fame

Harlan "Hod" Preston (1917 – 1995) was an American automobile racer inducted into the Michigan Motor Sports Hall of Fame in 1987.

In 1936, Preston started racing jalopies and gradually raced roadsters, stock cars, and midgets. Preston raced with the Hurricane Hot Rod Club from Chicago, led by Andy Granatelli; with them he raced in Cincinnati, Ohio, Springfield, Illinois, Saint Louis, Missouri; Milwaukee, Wisconsin; Crown Point, Indiana, and Soldier Field in Chicago. In addition, Preston ran some outlaw races running at Dayton, Fremont, Ohio, Toledo, Ohio, Windsor, Ontario, New Castle, Indiana, Winchester, Indiana; Tampa, Florida and Orlando, Florida.

In his home state of Michigan, he raced at Tuscola County Fairgrounds, Ionia Fairgrounds Speedway, Saginaw County Fairgrounds, Owosso Speedway, Whiskey Ridge Speedway, Maple Speedway in Adrian, Michigan, Jackson Motor Speedway and the Michigan State Fairgrounds Speedway and Motor City Speedway in Detroit.

Preston won several championships in Michigan and Ontario. Preston was later elected business manager of the Michigan Modified Stock Car Racing Association, and was also involved in setting up the live TV coverage of the Motor City Speedway races. Preston helped create several racetracks including Crystal Raceway, Mount Clemens Race Track, Flat Rock Speedway, and Raceway Park in Toledo. He also worked with John Marcum for the "Midwest Association for Race Cars" (MARC).

After retirement, Preston began producing fiberglass bodies for stock cars.

Preston was buried at Lakeland Memorial Gardens, Lakeland, Florida.
