= 2008 Kobalt Tools 500 =

Race details
- Race 4 of 36 in the 2008 NASCAR Sprint Cup Series season
- 2008 Kobalt Tools 500 program
- Date: March 9, 2008
- Official name: Kobalt Tools 500
- Location: Atlanta Motor Speedway, Hampton, Georgia
- Course: Permanent racing facility
- Course length: 1.54 miles (2.48 km)
- Distance: 325 laps, 500.5 mi (805.476 km)
- Weather: Temperatures reaching up to 57.9 °F (14.4 °C); wind speeds reaching up to 11.1 miles per hour (17.9 km/h)
- Average speed: 140.975 miles per hour (226.877 km/h)

Pole position
Driver	Jeff Gordon	Hendrick Motorsports
- Time: 29.927

Most laps led
Driver	Kyle Busch	Joe Gibbs Racing
- Laps: 173

Winner
No. 18	Kyle Busch	Joe Gibbs Racing

Television in the United States
- Network: Fox Broadcasting Company
- Announcers: Mike Joy, Darrell Waltrip and Larry McReynolds

The 2008 Kobalt Tools 500 was the fourth race in the 2008 NASCAR Sprint Cup Series, and was held on March 9, 2008 at Atlanta Motor Speedway in Hampton, Georgia, located outside the Georgia state capital. The race was televised on Fox starting at 1:30 PM US EDT, and broadcast on the Performance Racing Network and Sirius Satellite Radio starting at 1 PM US EDT.

== Pre-Race News ==
- A major shakeup at Team Red Bull finds A. J. Allmendinger out of the #84 Toyota and Mike Skinner, who drove the #27 Bill Davis Racing ride last week takes over for four races to give the team feedback on the current information. Meanwhile, Johnny Benson will replace Skinner in the #27 ride.

== Qualifying ==
Qualifying suffered from a short rain delay in the beginning stages but was finally reopened with Jeff Gordon winning the pole followed by Dale Earnhardt Jr., Martin Truex Jr., Carl Edwards and Bobby Labonte rounding out the top five. Forty-eight cars attempted to make the race but only 43 are able to start a Sprint Cup Race.

Failed to qualify: John Andretti (#34), Johnny Benson (#27), Bill Elliott (#21), Burney Lamar (#08), Ken Schrader (#49).

== Race ==
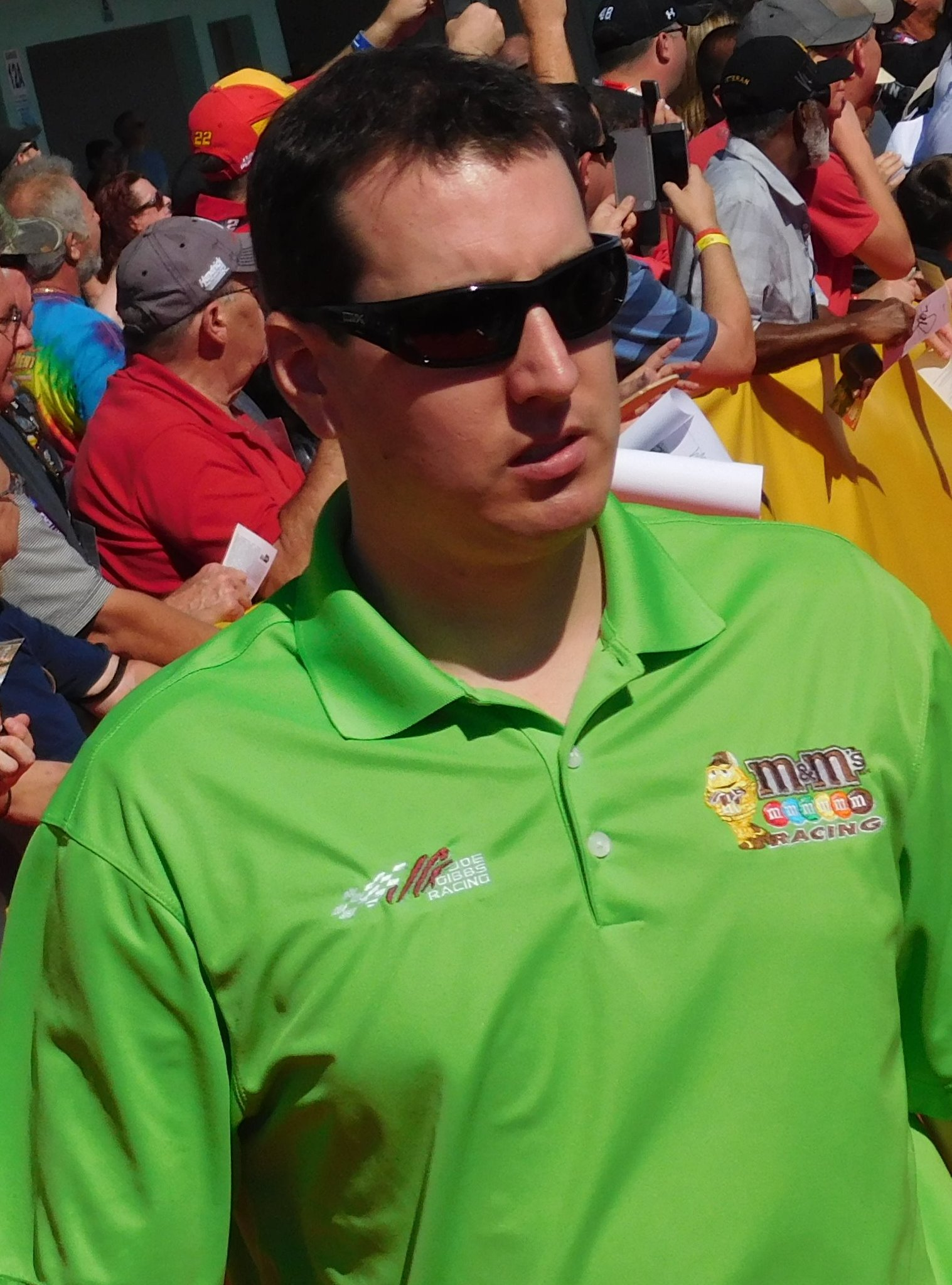
Kyle Busch won the race.

For the first time since June 1954 (when Al Keller won in a Jaguar on the road course at Linden Airport), a foreign nameplate found its way to the winners' circle as Kyle Busch dominated the field to win his fifth Cup race of his career, and his first win driving for Joe Gibbs Racing. The victory also gave Toyota their first Sprint Cup victory after 40 races. Carl Edwards, still smarting from last week's win that found a loose oil tank, costing him 100 points in the drivers chase, his owner Jack Roush 100 owners' points and suspended crew chief Bob Osborne for six races until April 30 as well as a $100,000 fine, was in the lead until there were 50 laps to go and Edwards' transmission in the #99 Ford blew up, finishing 42nd, and falling deeper out of the top 12.

Much of the pre and post-race talk was about the tires Goodyear supplied to the teams. Tony Stewart claimed that the tires were shoddy in a post-race commentary. Dale Earnhardt Jr. also said that the tires did not work well on the subject of its grip, while Jeff Gordon claimed that in light of Stewart's gripes that "I think he went a little overboard". The tiremaker commented the day after that in a press release "if the drivers aren't happy, Goodyear's not happy."

== Results ==
POS	ST	#	DRIVER	SPONSOR / OWNER	CAR	LAPS	MONEY	STATUS	LED	PTS
1	6	18	Kyle Busch	Snickers (Joe Gibbs)	Toyota	325	175575	running	173	195
2	32	20	Tony Stewart	Home Depot 10 Years Service Award (Joe Gibbs)	Toyota	325	162886	running	0	170
3	2	88	Dale Earnhardt Jr.	AMP Energy / National Guard (Rick Hendrick)	Chevrolet	325	125050	running	62	170
4	13	16	Greg Biffle	Jackson Hewitt (Jack Roush)	Ford	325	106875	running	1	165
5	1	24	Jeff Gordon	DuPont (Rick Hendrick)	Chevrolet	325	136686	running	1	160
6	7	07	Clint Bowyer	DirecTV (Richard Childress)	Chevrolet	325	94850	running	52	155
7	8	29	Kevin Harvick	Shell / Pennzoil (Richard Childress)	Chevrolet	325	124086	running	0	146
8	38	17	Matt Kenseth	DeWalt (Jack Roush)	Ford	325	124341	running	0	142
9	35	83	Brian Vickers	Red Bull (Dietrich Mateschitz)	Toyota	325	79200	running	1	143
10	15	31	Jeff Burton	AT&T Mobility (Richard Childress)	Chevrolet	325	123958	running	0	134
11	29	2	Kurt Busch	Miller Lite (Roger Penske)	Dodge	325	79325	running	0	130
12	5	43	Bobby Labonte	Cheerios / Betty Crocker (Petty Enterprises)	Dodge	325	114436	running	1	132
13	11	48	Jimmie Johnson	Lowe's / Kobalt Tools (Rick Hendrick)	Chevrolet	325	127786	running	0	124
14	12	12	Ryan Newman	Alltel (Roger Penske)	Dodge	324	115075	running	0	121
15	22	11	Denny Hamlin	FedEx Ground (Joe Gibbs)	Toyota	324	112691	running	0	118
16	19	42	Juan Pablo Montoya	Wrigley's Big Red (Chip Ganassi)	Dodge	324	104058	running	0	115
17	39	5	Casey Mears	Kellogg's / Carquest (Rick Hendrick)	Chevrolet	324	89850	running	0	112
18	28	66	Scott Riggs	State Water Heaters (Gene Haas)	Chevrolet	324	93808	running	0	109
19	20	15	Paul Menard	Menards / Energizer (Dale Earnhardt, Inc.)	Chevrolet	324	83225	running	0	106
20	30	00	David Reutimann	Aaron's Dream Machine (Michael Waltrip)	Toyota	323	92808	running	0	103
21	3	1	Martin Truex Jr.	Bass Pro Shops / Tracker Boats (Dale Earnhardt, Inc.)	Chevrolet	323	105633	running	0	100
22	10	8	Mark Martin	U.S. Army (Dale Earnhardt, Inc.)	Chevrolet	323	108458	running	0	97
23	14	6	David Ragan	AAA (Jack Roush)	Ford	323	83850	running	0	94
24	26	7	Robby Gordon	Valvoline / Jim Beam (Robby Gordon)	Dodge	323	95858	running	0	91
25	33	77	Sam Hornish Jr.	Penske Truck Rental (Roger Penske)	Dodge	323	117550	running	0	88
26	43	44	Dale Jarrett	UPS (Michael Waltrip)	Toyota	322	73725	running	0	85
27	34	84	Mike Skinner	Red Bull (Dietrich Mateschitz)	Toyota	322	69800	running	0	82
28	9	9	Kasey Kahne	Budweiser (Gillett Evernham Motorsports)	Dodge	322	107041	running	1	84
29	42	28	Travis Kvapil	Zaxby's (Yates Racing)	Ford	322	99689	running	0	76
30	27	55	Michael Waltrip	NAPA Auto Parts (Michael Waltrip)	Toyota	321	81508	running	0	73
31	25	41	Reed Sorenson	Target / Polaroid (Chip Ganassi)	Dodge	321	99489	running	0	70
32	31	38	David Gilliland	FreeCreditReport.com (Yates Racing)	Ford	321	81222	running	0	67
33	23	40	Dario Franchitti	Fastenal (Chip Ganassi)	Dodge	321	78050	running	0	64
34	16	22	Dave Blaney	Caterpillar (Bill Davis)	Toyota	321	69025	running	0	61
35	21	10	Patrick Carpentier	Cintas (Gillett Evernham Motorsports)	Dodge	320	68990	running	0	58
36	17	78	Joe Nemechek	Furniture Row Racing (Barney Visser)	Chevrolet	320	68955	running	0	55
37	37	96	J.J. Yeley	DLP HDTV / H.H. Gregg (Jeff Moorad)	Toyota	320	76920	running	0	52
38	41	01	Regan Smith	DEI / Principal Financial Group (Dale Earnhardt, Inc.)	Chevrolet	320	76885	running	0	49
39	36	70	Jeremy Mayfield	Haas Automation (Gene Haas)	Chevrolet	318	68850	running	0	46
40	24	26	Jamie McMurray	Irwin Industrial Tools (Jack Roush)	Ford	317	76810	running	0	43
41	40	45	Kyle Petty	Paralyzed Veterans of America (Petty Enterprises)	Dodge	313	68765	running	0	40
42	4	99	Carl Edwards	Aflac (Jack Roush)	Ford	274	116145	engine	33	42
43	18	19	Elliott Sadler	Best Buy / Garmin (Gillett Evernham Motorsports)	Dodge	257	94518	crash	0	34
Failed to qualify
POS	NAME	NBR	SPONSOR	OWNER	CAR					
44	Ken Schrader	49	Qtrax.com	Beth Ann Morgenthau	Dodge					
45	Bill Elliott	21	Little Debbie Nutty Bars	Wood Brothers	Ford					
46	Johnny Benson Jr.	27	Toyota Certified Used Vehicles	Bill Davis	Toyota					
47	Burney Lamar	08	Rhino's Energy Drink	John Carter	Dodge					
48	John Andretti	34	Front Row Motorsports	Bob Jenkins	Chevrolet					

Previous race: 2008 UAW-Dodge 400	Sprint Cup Series; 2008 season	Next race: 2008 Food City 500
