= John Ritter (disambiguation) =

John Ritter (1948–2003) was an American actor.

John Ritter may also refer to:

- John Ritter (congressman) (1779–1851), American legislator from Pennsylvania
- John Ritter (racing driver) (1910–1948), American racing driver
- John H. Ritter (born 1951), American novelist, short story writer, teacher, and lecturer
- John D. Ritter, vocalist for American metalcore band Myka Relocate
- John Steele Ritter, American classical keyboardist and teacher
- John Ritter (rugby union), Australian international rugby union player

== See also ==
- Johann Wilhelm Ritter (1776–1810), German chemist, physicist and philosopher
