= Joy Fair =

American race car driver (1930–2011)

Joy Fair (September 10, 1930 – December 10, 2011) was an American stock car racing driver. He competed primarily in the ARCA Racing Series on short tracks in the Midwestern United States, winning over 700 races in 12 states and Canada, retiring as the winningest race car driver in Michigan history.

== Career ==
Fair began racing in 1949, competing for 40 years, winning multiple championships at the Flat Rock Speedway in Flat Rock, Michigan, the NASCAR sanctioned track at the Mount Clemens Race Track in Mount Clemens, Michigan and the Toledo Speedway in Toledo, Ohio, winning ten late model championships at Flat Rock, seven at Toledo, and another seven in Mount Clemens.

Known as "The Fair One" due to his cooperative spirit in the racing community, Fair was dominant in the Midwest for several decades, winning the 1965 Baer Field in Ft. Wayne, Indiana, was champion for six years running at the Toledo Speedway (1967–1972), won the inaugural Glass City 200 in Toledo in 1968, won nine out of 14 features at Flat Rock Speedway in 1969, including a 100 lap invitational where he lapped the entire field, won two ARCA Supercar Series races at Toledo and at SunValley Speedway in Indiana in 1972, and was champion at Mount Clemens from 1974 to 1977.

Fair had two NASCAR Cup Series starts, both coming in 1956. His best finish was ninth at the 1956 NASCAR Grand National Series race at Soldier Field in Chicago, and his other start was on the Daytona Beach and Road Course where he experienced a DNF (clutch). Fair also won a dirt all-star race inside the Pontiac Silverdome (former home of the Detroit Lions of the NFL) in 1982, beating NASCAR greats David Pearson (second place), Neil Bonnett, Kyle Petty and short track ace Bob Senneker.

== Legacy ==
Senneker said of Fair, "Joy was a tough competitor but a gentleman to race with. Early in my career, Fair spun me out at Berlin Raceway, then waited until I got straightened out before continuing to race. How many times have you ever seen that happen?" His car #1 retired from ARCA competition in 1999, the first in series history to receive such an honor, and Fair was inducted into the Michigan Motor Sports Hall of Fame in 1986.

Fair died at his home in Pontiac, Michigan on December 10, 2011. The Flat Rock Speedway hosts the annual Joy Fair Memorial 100 each May in his honor.
