= Lockwood Aircraft =

American aircraft manufacturer

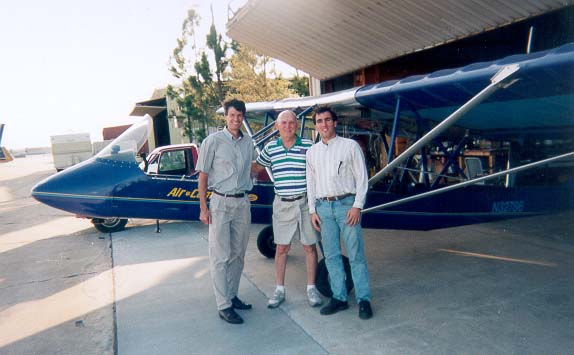
Phil Lockwood, Antonio Leza and Pedro Gonzalez pose in front of the Aircam.

The Lockwood Aircraft Corporation is an ultralight aircraft manufacturer located in Sebring, Florida.

Leza-Lockwood was started by ultralight pioneer Phil Lockwood after the National Geographic Society asked him to design a camera plane to film in the Ndoki Rain Forest in the northern Congo Basin. Lockwood wanted a plane that would allow an engine failure in the jungle so he leaned towards a twin engine. The twin engine design required a huge vertical stabilizer which required a big-torsion resistant fuselage tail. The resulting concept was the Aircam.

Phil Lockwood sought funding from Antonio Leza to form the Leza-Lockwood Company with the intention of making the Aircam kit available to the public. During the development only two engineers, Michael Schwartz and Pedro Gonzalez, worked for Leza-Lockwood.

In 2007, Lockwood Aircraft, a new company formed by Phil Lockwood, purchased all design rights, inventory and tooling from the prior owner Antonio Leza.

== Aircraft ==
- Lockwood Aircam
- Lockwood Drifter
