= Vicki Wood =

American racing driver (1919–2020)

- Born: March 15, 1919 Detroit, Michigan, U.S.
- Died: June 5, 2020 (aged 101) Troy, Michigan, U.S.

Victoria Rose Wood (née Raczak; March 15, 1919 – June 5, 2020), known as "the fastest woman in racing", was an American professional automobile racer and one of the first women to compete in NASCAR.

== Early life ==
Born in Detroit, Michigan, Wood was the only girl in a family of seven children. Her parents were homemaker Rose Krok Raczak and contractor Paul Raczak. She worked odd jobs after high school. In 1941, she married Tom Fitzpatrick, who died in Germany late in World War II. In 1947, she wed Clarence "Skeeter" Wood.

== Career ==
In 1953, her husband took her to a "powder puff" race at Motor City Speedway in Detroit. She commented, "If I couldn't drive any better than that, I'd quit". A week later, her husband had borrowed a 1937 Dodge coupe for her to compete and she finished ninth of the 25 women racing in the event that day. The next night they went to a race at Mount Clemens where she won her first race.

She became the first woman to compete against men in races in Michigan. She also set a number of women's records at American race tracks, including fastest lap (130.3 mph) and fastest one-way mark (150.375) at Daytona International Speedway in 1959 and 1960, respectively, and at Atlanta International Speedway in 1961.

In 1958, a magazine ad for Pontiac automobiles featured Wood in a photograph and the accompanying text that noted "... Vicki Wood and her '58 Pontiac taught men drivers a lesson in winning the 50 m.p.h. safe passing event".

She retired from racing in 1963. In the late 1960s she and her husband moved to Florida, where she worked in a department store.

Wood was inducted into the Michigan Motor Sports Hall of Fame in 2019.

On June 5, 2020, Wood died in a hospital in Troy, Michigan, at age 101.

== See also ==
- List of female NASCAR drivers
