= Lockwood Aircam =

American kit aircraft

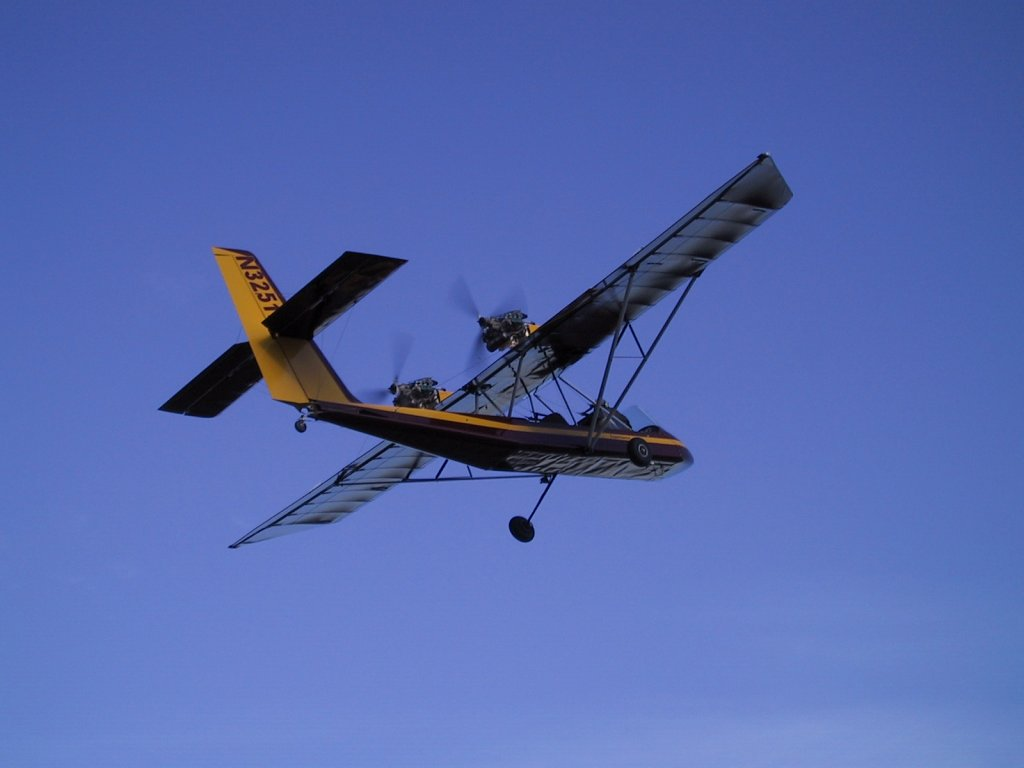

General information
- Type: Kit aircraft
- National origin: United States
- Manufacturer: Lockwood Aircraft
- Designer: Phil Lockwood
- Status: In production
- Number built: 250 (2019)

History
- Manufactured: 1995-present
- Introduction date: 1995
- First flight: 1995
- Developed from: Lockwood Drifter

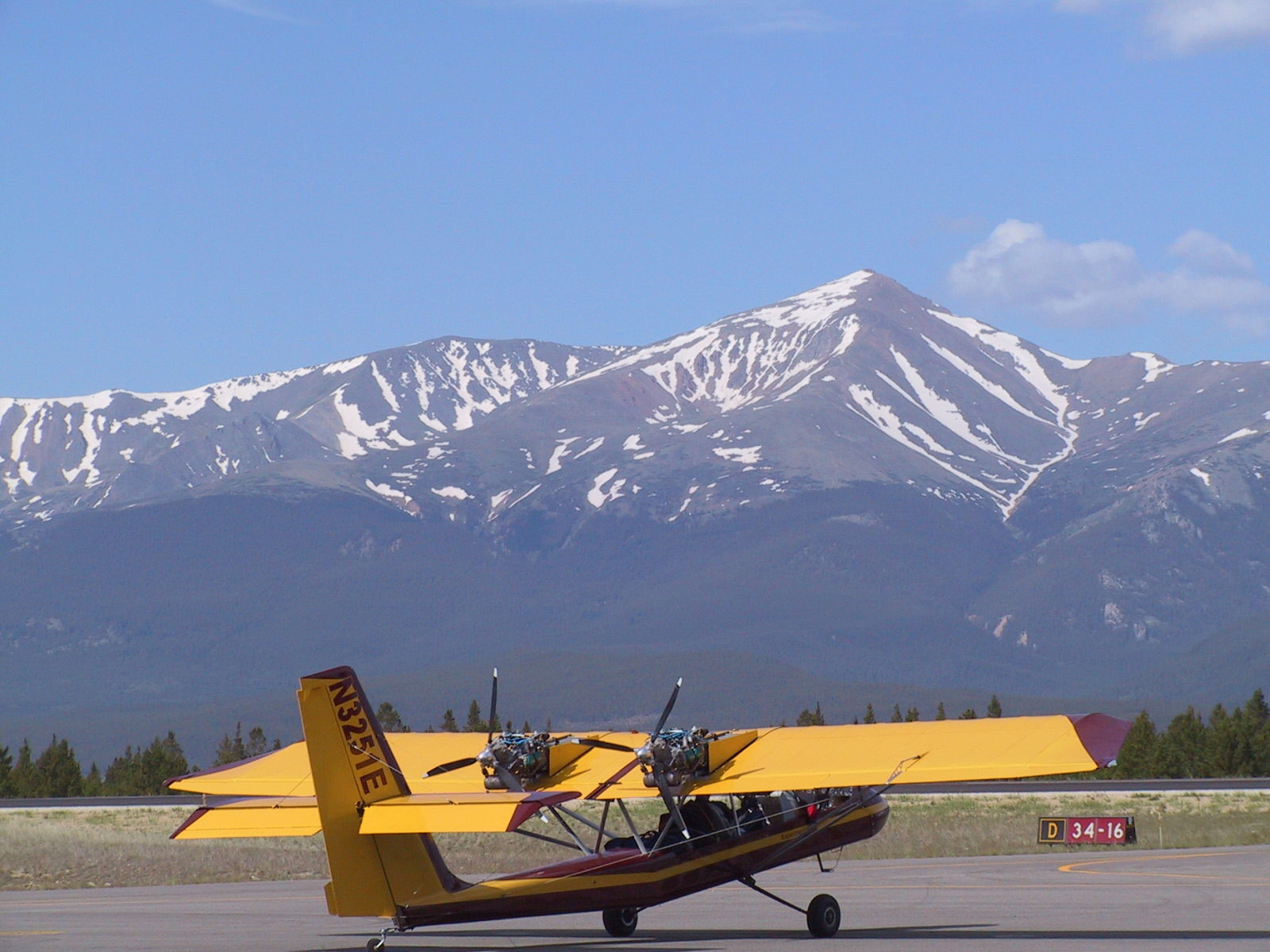
Aircam at Lake County Airport (Colorado), highest airport in the U.S.

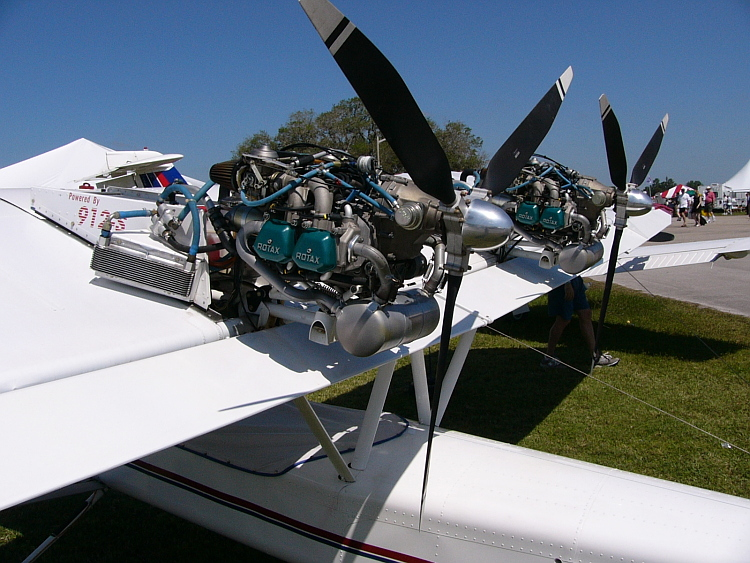
Pusher engine installation of two Rotax 912ULSs in a Lockwood Aircam

The Lockwood Aircam (also called the Air Cam and AirCam) is a high-wing, twin engine pusher configuration aircraft with conventional landing gear, based on the single engine Lockwood Drifter and sold in kit form by Lockwood Aircraft. The open-cockpit aircraft seats two in tandem. As of 2019, 250 Aircams were licensed and flying. In 2019, a complete kit with Rotax 912ULS engines, less instruments, paint, shipping and crating was priced at US$128,990.

== Design and development ==
The first prototype Aircam was built in 1995. Designed by Phil Lockwood, founder of Lockwood Aircraft, it was built for the National Geographic Society for research and photography in the Ndoki Rain Forest in the northern Congo Basin. It was built to fly low and slow and to provide a wide, unobstructed view, with the additional security of a second engine. The design has since been improved while retaining the same layout.

The initial version, produced by Leza-Lockwood Corporation, was powered by twin Rotax 582 powerplants of 64 hp (48 kW) each. Twin 80 hp (60 kW) Rotax 912 and 115 hp (86 kW) 914 engines were optional. Later, the 582 was eliminated, the 912 engine became standard and Leza-Lockwood's name was changed to Lockwood. In 2015, an optional bubble canopy kit was introduced. The aircraft can also be configured with floats to become amphibious.

The Aircam was designed to be able to take off on one engine if needed, and the positioning of the engines close to the centerline contributes to this capability as well as its benign single engine handling.

The Aircam has a landing roll of 300 feet and a takeoff roll of under 200 feet.

== Accidents and incidents ==
The United States National Transportation Safety Board (NTSB) lists eight accidents involving Aircams between 1993 and February 2010. In these eight accidents, there was one fatality, one serious injury, one minor injury and seven people uninjured.

Jack Roush of NASCAR team Roush Fenway Racing nearly lost his life after the Aircam he was flying struck a power line and sank in a lake near Troy, Alabama in April 2002. He was saved in a dramatic rescue by retired U.S. Marine Larry Hicks.

== Specifications (Aircam) ==
Data from Lockwood Aircraft website

General characteristics

- Crew: one
- Capacity: one passenger
- Length: 27 ft 0 in (8.23 m)
- Wingspan: 36 ft 0 in (10.97 m)
- Height: 8 ft 4 in (2.54 m) to top of vertical stabilizer
- Empty weight: 1,040 lb (472 kg)
- Gross weight: 1,680 lb (762 kg)
- Fuel capacity: 28 US gallons (106 litres)

Performance

- Cruise speed: 100 mph (160 km/h, 87 kn)
- Stall speed: 39 mph (63 km/h, 34 kn)
- Never exceed speed: 110 mph (180 km/h, 96 kn)
- Range: 340 mi (550 km, 300 nmi) at 70 mph (113 km/h)
- Endurance: 6 hours
- Rate of climb: 1,500 ft/min (7.6 m/s) on both engines, 300 fpm on one engine

== See also ==
Aircraft of comparable role, configuration, and era

- Blue Yonder Twin Engine EZ Flyer
