= Della Woods =

- Born: 1940 (age 85–86); Lake Orion, Michigan, U.S.
- Occupation: Drag racer

Della Woods (born 1940) is an AA/FC, National Hot Rod Association (NHRA) professional dragster driver. She was the first female driver in the five-second bracket in the funny car class, and the first female driver to go to the semifinals at an NHRA national event. She held the latter record for almost 22 years.

== Early racing career ==
Della Woods and her brother Bernie Woods were from Lake Orion, Michigan. They campaigned match races during the 1960s and early 1970s, with Bernie as crew chief and Della as driver. Woods qualified for an NHRA AA/FC license in 1968 signed by Rodger Lindamood, Don Garlits and Don Kohler, only to have the association revoke the license, saying it was too dangerous for a woman to run in that class. Losing the license caused the brother-sister team to lose several match racing engagements, provoking Woods to call the NHRA and inform them that if they took her license they would have to take the all female drivers' licenses as well.

== Career restart ==
Della and Bernie were forced to quit due to finances in 1972. Della married De Nichols in 1976. In 1982 Della Woods and De Nichols bought the famed Fighting Irish car, the only non-Mopar car she drove, from Dick Rosberg and his partners Novak and McDaniel. Della licensed in Atlanta then started entering national events. They finished 20th in the final standings after qualifying at only eight NHRA events. In 1986 she was in a serious crash at Firebird Raceway in Phoenix, Arizona.

In 1996, the couple purchased the first 4-second car from Chuck Etchells. They tested at Milan Dragway then had to trailer the car due to other commitments.

== Awards ==
Della Woods was inducted into the Michigan Motor Sports Hall of Fame in 1999, and the East Coast Drag Times Hall of Fame in 2015. In 2016, she was inducted into the Mopar Hall of Fame.
