= Mount Clemens Race Track =

Raceway

Coordinates: 42.6017°N 82.8610°W

Mt. Clemens Race Track
- Location: Mt. Clemens, Michigan
- Opened: 1951
- Surface: Asphalt
- Length: 0.5 mi (0.80 km)
- Turns: 4

Mount Clemens Race Track was located in Mount Clemens, Michigan, in suburban Detroit and opened on September 3, 1951. Grandstand seating 5,500 and included half-mile, quarter-mile ovals and a figure-eight tracks.

Notable drivers included Joy Fair, a prolific winner on short-tracks in the Midwest, Canadian driver Junior Hanley, NASCAR driver Tracy Leslie,and NASCAR legend Dick Trickle, and even featured performances from the Tommy Bartlett Show, an acrobatic water skiing show that performed on a lagoon inside the track.

In 1985, ownership placed the race track on the market and sold it to the city of Mount Clemens in 1986, ending its 36-year run. The city of Mount Clemens then sold the race track property in 1987 to Riverside Associates, who converted to use for the Gibraltar Trade Center, which opened in 1990.
