= Kim Lahaie Richards =

American drag racer and crew chief

- Born: Lansing, Michigan, United States
- Occupation: Crew chief
- Awards: Michigan Motor Sports Hall of Fame

Kim Lahaie Richards is an American drag racer and crew chief.

== Biography ==
Richards was raised in Lansing, Michigan. She is the daughter of Dick LaHaie, who started drag racing in the 1950s. Dick influenced his daughter by teaching her about the mechanical side of vehicles. While in high school, she played basketball and softball. Shortly after graduating from high school, Richards went to California and later moved back to the Midwestern United States. She had begun racing in cross-country motorbike races at the age of 14. Richards joined her brother, Jeff, in working with her father's drag team. Prior to this, she worked for a construction gang as a water truck driver. The crew won the 1987 NHRA Top-Fuel Championship. Richards was named the 1987 Top-Fuel Crew Chief of the Year. By working as her father's crew chief, Richards helped to secure top-five finishes in the Top Fuel championship between 1986 and 1990.

Richards began racing in 1992. Her best result of the year occurred at a drag strip in Gainesville, Florida where she qualified in 14th position, and was quicker than Don Prudhomme and Scott Kalitta in the first and second rounds, before losing to race winner Eddie Hill in the event's semi-final. Richards was hired as a crew member for Chuck Etchells' team in 1993. She was responsible for his car's complicated multistage four-disc clutch unit when Etchells became the first person to record a lap time under five seconds in the Funny Car category. She married crew chief Tim Richards in 1996. Richards was inducted into the Michigan Motor Sports Hall of Fame in 2014.
