= Lockwood Drifter =

Drifter
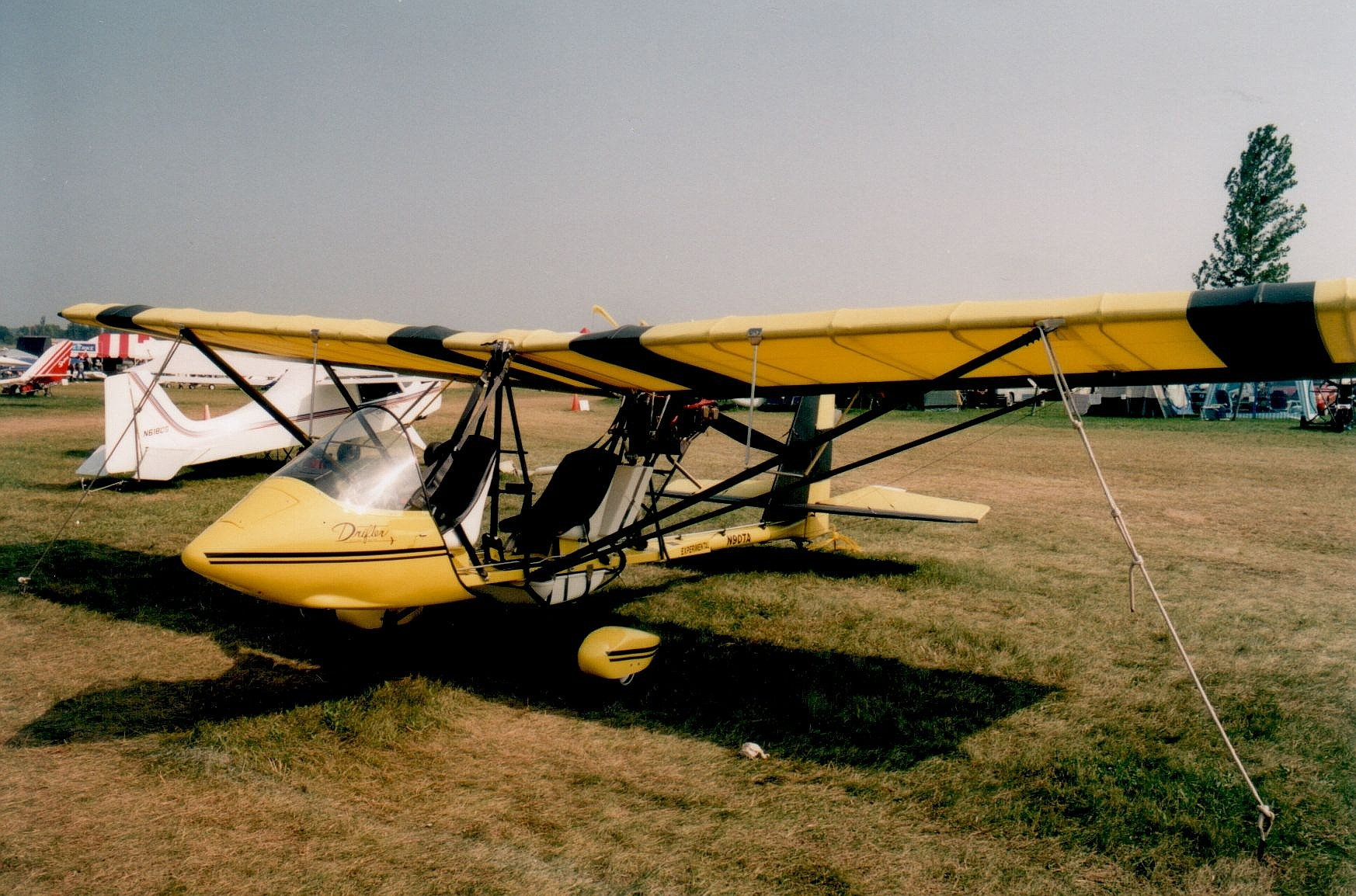
- 1999 model Tiger Aviation Drifter SB

General information
- Type: Kit aircraft
- National origin: United States
- Manufacturer: Lockwood Aircraft
- Status: Kits in production
- Number built: 1425 (2011)

History
- Variants: Lockwood Aircam; Sport Flight Talon; Advanced Aviation Explorer

The Lockwood Drifter is a family of high wing, single engine, pusher configuration, open cockpit, one and two-seat kit aircraft that was first introduced in the 1980s by Maxair and remains in production today by Lockwood Aircraft of Sebring, Florida.

== Development ==
The Drifter was first marketed by Maxair in the 1980s as both a single seat and two seats-in-tandem kitplane. The original single seater was light enough when fitted with the 28 hp (21 kW) Rotax 277 engine to qualify for the US FAR 103 Ultralight Vehicles category, with an empty weight of 240 lb (109 kg).

After Maxair went out of business, the design was picked up in 1997 by Lockwood Aircraft who produced kits for a number of single and two-seat versions, mostly differing by installed engine. The Lockwood versions are all wire-braced using a kingpost to support the ground wires. Over 1000 wire-braced Drifters have been completed and flown.

Lockwood estimates that a builder will take 300 hours to complete a Super Drifter from the currently supplied kit.

=== Australian developments ===
From the 1983, Austflight ULA originally based at Ballina, New South Wales began licence production of the Drifter. In 1986, the company moved to purpose built facilities at Boonah, Queensland where they built fully assembled Drifter variants certified by Civil Aviation Safety Authority for the Australian market with powerplants including Rotax 503 to Rotax 582 and Rotax 912 engines. Further improvements led to the Strut Braced (SB) version built to CAO 101.55 class certification in December 1993. The Drifter SB was sold in the US in the 1990s by Tiger Aviation of Trenton, South Carolina. Over 500 strut braced Drifters were completed and flown.

In late 1995 a joint venture called the Shanghai Fenton Light Aircraft Company (SFLAC) was established with the Shanghai Aircraft Manufacturing Factory for the manufacture of Australian versions in China. Austflight suffered financial losses due to the costs associated with certification and the joint venture agreement. In May 2002 Austflight sold the last of its assets and transferred the Drifter Type Certificate to Noosa Air Pty Ltd. Drifter Aircraft Pty Ltd of Dalby, Queensland was incorporated in 2006 to manufacture and market the Drifter and on the 1st of June 2006 was issued with a production certificate by CASA.

== Design ==
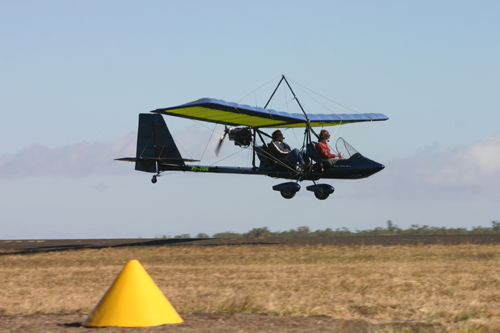
Avid Aviation's Austflight A503 being used for flying training at Dalby, Queensland, Australia.

All models of the Drifter are built around an aluminum tube keel, with aluminum tubing making up the keel-to-wing structure. There is no enclosed fuselage; the seats are open to the air. The conventional landing gear includes a steerable tailwheel. Most Drifter kits were delivered with a small fibreglass nose fairing.

The wing is built from aluminum tubing and covered with pre-sewn Dacron sailcloth envelopes. Controls are conventional three-axis, with dual controls and center-mounted control sticks. Lockwood offers optional flaps as part of its STOL kit. The single seat Drifter and XP503 are both stressed for +6/-3g.

With its large wing area, the Drifter adapted well to floats and was fitted with several types, including Full Lotus floats. The glide ratio is 9:1.

== Operational history ==
Drifters have been widely used in a number of roles, including recreational flying, agricultural spraying, aerial photography, flight training and banner towing, during which many Drifters have accumulated high numbers of flying hours, leading one reviewer to note: "its long track record has revealed no weakness in the Drifter". A number of Lockwood XP503s have been reported to have exceeded 3000 hours and one Drifter used for banner towing exceeded 10,000 flight hours.

In reviewing the Drifter, Andre Cliche said:

The outstanding aspect of the Drifter is its totally unobstructed view. The pilot sits on the boom tube with all the hardware behind him. This gives the impression of free flight. It is like you are flying a chair. The Drifter has other qualities of course. Its forgiving handling, mechanical simplicity, ease of maintenance and solid airframe all contributed to the Drifter’s good reputation.

Bayerl et al. describe the aircraft as "light in weight, but aerodynamically handicapped", due to its high-drag cable bracing.

== Variants ==
Maxair Drifter
Single seat, wire braced, equipped with 28 hp (21 kW) Rotax 277 engine, 500 lb (227 kg) gross weight.
Maxair Drifter DR447
Single seat, wire braced, equipped with 40 hp (30 kW) Rotax 447 engine, 785 lb (356 kg) gross weight. Intended for float use.
Maxair Drifter XP503
Two seats in tandem, wire braced, equipped with 50 hp (37 kW) Rotax 503 engine, 785 lb (356 kg) gross weight.
Lockwood Drifter DR447
Single seat, wire braced, equipped with 40 hp (30 kW) Rotax 447 engine, 785 lb (356 kg) gross weight.
Lockwood Drifter XP503
Two seats in tandem, wire braced, equipped with 50 hp (37 kW) Rotax 503 engine, 785 lb (356 kg) gross weight.
Lockwood Drifter MU582
Two seats in tandem, wire braced, equipped with 64 hp (48 kW) Rotax 582 engine, 900 lb (408 kg) gross weight. Intended for float and agricultural use.
Lockwood Super Drifter
Two seats in tandem, wire braced, equipped with 80 hp (60 kW) Rotax 912 engine, 1,000 lb (454 kg) gross weight. Intended for amphibious float use.
Tiger Aviation Drifter SB
Two seats in tandem, strut braced, equipped with the 64 hp (48 kW) Rotax 582 engine or optionally the 80 hp (60 kW) Jabiru 2200 engine, 1,100 lb (499 kg) gross weight. 500 reported as flying.

== Specifications (Super Drifter) ==
Data from Lockwood Aircraft & Kitplanes

General characteristics

- Crew: one
- Capacity: one passenger and 505 lbs (229 kg) useful load
- Length: 22 ft 0 in (6.71 m)
- Wingspan: 30 ft 0 in (9.15 m)
- Height: 10 ft 0 in (3.05 m)
- Wing area: 160 sq ft (14.88 m^{2})
- Empty weight: 495 lb (224 kg)
- Max takeoff weight: 1,000 lb (454 kg)
- Powerplant: 1 × Rotax 912 UL four stroke piston engine, 80 hp (60 kW)

Performance

- Cruise speed: 75 mph (122 km/h, 65 kn)
- Stall speed: 34 mph (55 km/h, 30 kn)
- Never exceed speed: 85 mph (138 km/h, 74 kn)
- Range: 230 mi (373 km, 200 nmi)
- Rate of climb: 1,000 ft/min (5.08 m/s)
- Wing loading: 6.25 lb/sq ft (30.51 kg/m^{2})
- Power/mass: 12.5 lb/hp (0.13 kW/kg)

== See also ==
Aircraft of comparable role, configuration, and era

- Aero-Works Aerolite 103
- Airdrome Dream Classic
- Avid Champion
- Beaujon Mach .07
- Beaujon Enduro
- Birdman WT-11 Chinook
- CGS Hawk
- Freebird II
- Hummel Bird
- ISON Airbike
- Skystar Kitfox Lite
- Spectrum RX-28 Beaver
