= Marion Weyant Ruth =

American aviator and aviation instructor (1918–2004)

- Born: February 7, 1918; Lansing, Michigan, U.S.
- Died: November 20, 2004 (aged 86); Lansing, Michigan, U.S.
- Occupation(s): Aviator, aviation instructor

Marion Weyant "Babe" Ruth (February 7, 1918 – November 20, 2004) was an American aviator and aviation instructor. She was inducted into the Michigan Aviation Hall of Fame, the Michigan Motor Sports Hall of Fame, and the Michigan Women's Hall of Fame during her lifetime.

== Early life ==
Marion Jane Weyant was born in Lansing, Michigan, the daughter of Lloyd Jennings Weyant and Marie Weyant. She was fascinated with airplanes from a young age, and received an encouraging letter from Amelia Earhart in 1933. She and her mother built a stand to sell sodas near Lansing's Capital City Airport to raise money for lessons. Soon after, she started flying lessons. At age 19, she had earned her private pilot's license, becoming the youngest licensed pilot in the United States, male or female, in 1937. In 1941 she qualified for a commercial pilot's license.

== Career ==
Weyant was busy doing exhibition flying in the 1930s, and for her performances in the Michigan Air Tour in 1937 and 1938, she won the Joyce Hartung trophy in 1940. In 1942, she began to teach aspiring Air Force and airline pilots using the Link Aviation Simulator. She is considered one of the first female flight instructors in the United States. In the 1970s, she taught in the aviation department at Lansing Community College in Michigan. In 1976, she competed in the All Women's International Air Race. By 1986, she had logged over 10,000 hours in the air. In her later years, Weyant taught pilot safety seminars, and worked to preserve and record Michigan aviation history.

Ruth won the "Piper Award" in 1964, as the woman who had logged the most flying hours that year in the International Flying Farmers organization. In 1980, Ruth was recognized with the Pioneer Woman Pilot Award by the OX5 Club of America; in 1988, she was inducted into the Michigan Aviation Hall of Fame, and in 1992 she was inducted into the Michigan Motor Sports Hall of Fame. In 2002, the Ninety-Nines recognized her with a lifetime achievement award. In 2003, she was inducted into the Michigan Women's Hall of Fame.

In 2003, Ruth's memoir, Airport Kid: Learning to Fly was published by Michigan Historical Press.

== Personal life ==
Marion Weyant was active in Zonta International and other women's organizations. She married Dale Charles Ruth in 1947. They had two daughters. She was widowed in 2000, and died in 2004, age 86.

In 2015, a flag that belonged to Ruth was part of the "Lansing Goes to War" exhibit at the Lansing Historical Society. February 7, 2005 was declared "Marion 'Babe' Ruth Day" in Ingham County, Michigan, by resolution of the county's Board of Commissioners.
