= Gibraltar Trade Center =

Public market

- Location: Gibraltar, Michigan (1970–1980) Taylor, Michigan (1980–2014) Mount Clemens, Michigan (1990–2017)
- Opening date: 1970
- Closing date: August, 2017
- Days normally open: Fridays, Saturdays, and Sundays
- Total retail floor area: 300,000 square feet

The Gibraltar Trade Center was a public market in the Metro Detroit region of the U.S. state of Michigan. As of its closure, it had one remaining location in Mount Clemens, Michigan which was previously home to the Mount Clemens Race Track. From 1980 to 2014, there was a second location in Taylor, Michigan.

The Gibraltar Trade Center was one of the nation's largest indoor flea markets; the location was over 600,000 square feet (56,000 m^{2}). In addition, some merchants set up shop outside the building, along its perimeter. On July 2, 2017, Gibraltar Trade Center Inc announced the closing of the Mount Clemens Weekend Market. The company blamed its closure on the rise of online sales.

According to CEO Bob Koester, the "Gibraltar Gun and Knife Shows" and the "Gibraltar Rug and Furniture" store in Warren, Michigan will remain open and operational.

In September 2026 Robert and Catrina Hensley of Detroit, Michigan announced plans to open Gibraltar Trade Center 2 located at The Mall of Monroe. The planned project will have a 56,000 square foot space, more than half the original size of the Taylor Gibraltar Trade Center. This new location is unaffiliated with the original Gibraltar Trade Center.

== History ==
The Gibraltar Trade Center started as an outdoor market, and auction house on Woodruff Road along the southern limits of Gibraltar, Michigan (hence the name) in the 1970's. It, later, relocated to a permanent location, inside of a former Joshua Doore warehouse on Eureka Road in Taylor in 1980, fully occupying the site by 1982. The Mount Clemens location opened in 1990. In 1993, the Taylor location doubled in size. During its 34 years in Taylor, the Gibraltar Trade Center went on to become a popular destination in the Downriver region of Metro Detroit.

The Taylor location closed permanently on November 16, 2014, and was demolished in 2015.

On July 2, 2017, it was officially announced by Gibraltar Trade Center Inc that the Mount Clemens location would be permanently closed after August, 2017.

On Feb 15, 2022, Pleasantrees announced plans to occupy the site.
