= John Ritter (racing driver) =

John Ritter (August 27, 1910 – October 12, 1948) was an Austrian outboard midget racing driver in the 1930s.

Standing just 5 ft 1 in (1.55 m) tall and weighing 135 lb (61 kg), Ritter was "one of the best" board track drivers of his time, racking up an unequalled winning record. He scored five wins in a row at the Nutley Velodrome in Nutley, New Jersey and four straight at the Coney Island Velodrome.

At Castle Hill Speedway in the Bronx in 1940, Ritter won the 150-lap race from last place, an "unprecedented" performance for an outboard midget. He claimed the national flat track racing title that year, also, and the Heiserman championship in 1940 and 1941.

Ritter often won against opponents in larger and more powerful cars.

He was killed in October 1948 while changing a tire at trackside, when he was hit by another competitor.

== Inductions ==
- Michigan Motor Sports Hall of Fame (1989)
- National Midget Auto Racing Hall of Fame (2003)
