= Jack Roush =

American businessman and race team owner

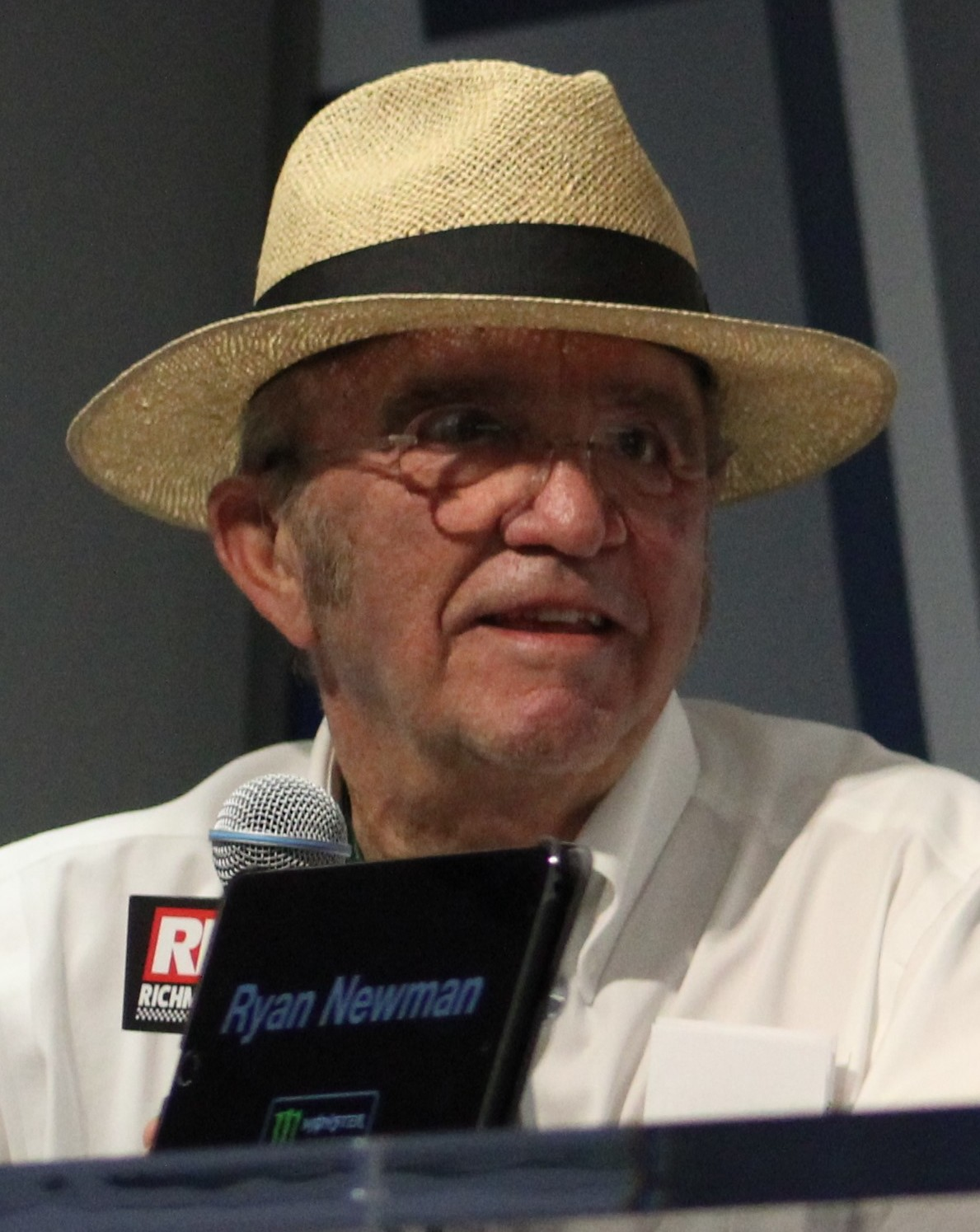
- Roush in 2018
- Born: Jackson Earnest Roush; April 19, 1942 (age 84); Covington, Kentucky, U.S.
- Occupation: NASCAR team owner
- Employer: Roush Fenway Keselowski Racing (owner)

Jackson Earnest Roush (born April 19, 1942) is an American businessman who is the founder, CEO, and co-owner of Roush Fenway Keselowski Racing, a NASCAR team headquartered in Concord, North Carolina, and is chairman of Roush Enterprises.

Roush Enterprises is the parent company for Roush Racing as well as Roush Industries, a freelance engineering firm; Roush Performance, an automotive aftermarket development company; and ROUSH CleanTech, a manufacturer of propane autogas fuel systems, all headquartered in Livonia, Michigan. His companies employ more than 2,000 people throughout North America and Europe.

Rarely seen without his trademark Panama hat, Roush is known on the NASCAR circuit as "The Cat in the Hat".

Roush was inducted into the International Motorsports Hall of Fame on April 27, 2006. In 2008, Roush was elected to the Michigan Sports Hall of Fame and was inducted on September 13, 2010, in Novi. On May 23, 2018, Roush was selected as one of the five inductees for the 2019 NASCAR Hall of Fame class. Roush was also inducted into the EAA Warbirds of America Hall of Fame on November 8, 2018, for his contributions to warbirds and the warbird community. On November 3, 2022, he was inducted into the SEMA (Specialty Aftermarket Market Association) Hall of Fame. Roush was inducted into the Motorsports Hall of Fame of America in 2022. In 2025, he was inducted into the Trans-Am Series Hall of Fame.

Roush Enterprises maintains a collection of race cars and collectible cars. The exhibit is free and is located in Livonia, Michigan.

== Early years ==
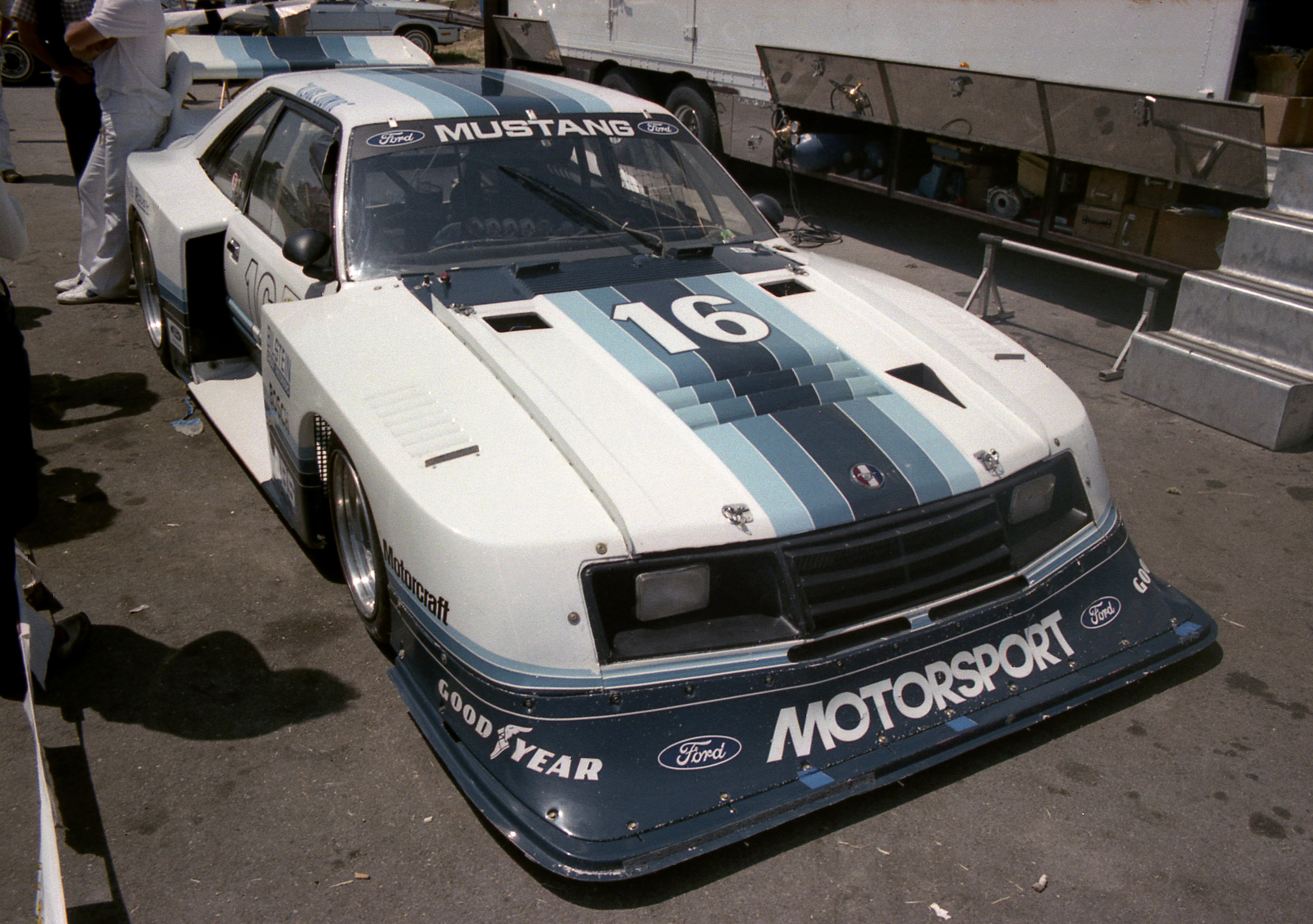
Klaus Ludwig drove the Roush-Zakspeed Ford Mustang Turbo during the 1981 and 1982 Camel GT race seasons.

Roush was born in Covington, Kentucky and grew up in Manchester, Ohio. He earned a mathematics degree with a minor in physics from Berea College, and a master's in scientific mathematics from Eastern Michigan University.

Roush worked at Ford after graduating in 1966, and left in 1970 to pursue his own company. He worked for a year at Chrysler before leaving to open his own engineering business. Roush then went on to partner with Wayne Gapp to race in NHRA, IHRA, and AHRA drag racing events.

Throughout much of his career Roush offered for sale the parts that he developed for his own team. In 1982, he partnered with German firm Zakspeed to develop road racing vehicles for Ford. This led to a very successful run in the Trans-Am series and IMSA Camel GT in the 1980s and early 90s. In 1988, Roush moved south and founded a NASCAR Winston Cup Series team with driver Mark Martin.

== NASCAR ==
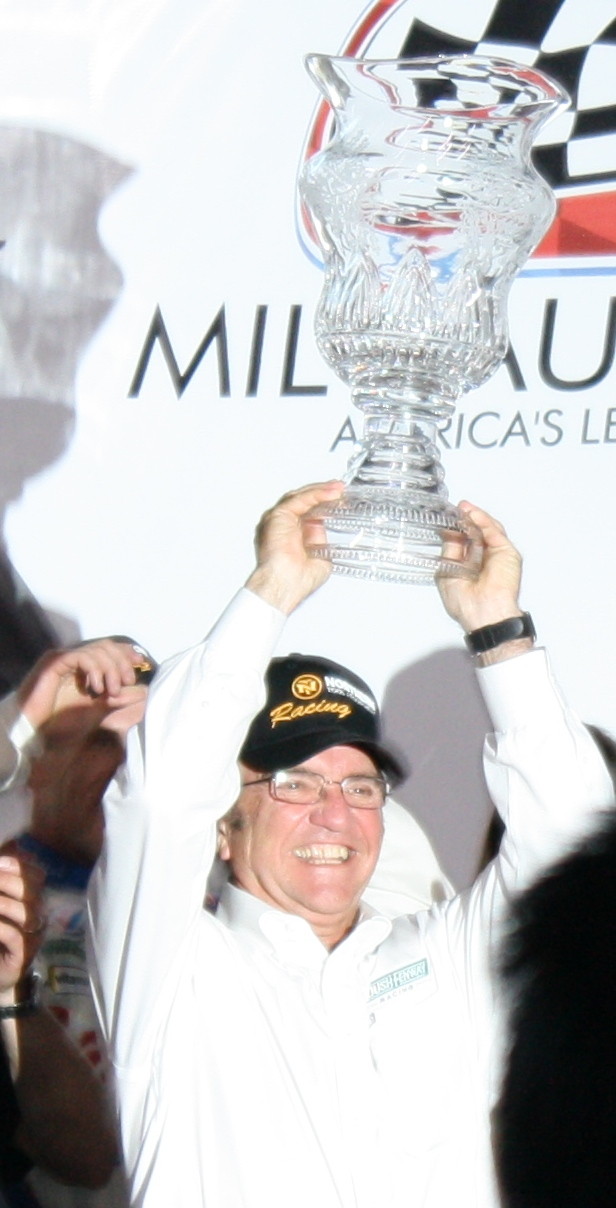
Roush at the Milwaukee Mile in 2009

RFK Racing currently fields three cars in the NASCAR Cup Series (driven by Brad Keselowski, Chris Buescher, and Ryan Preece). The Xfinity team was shut down at the end of the 2018 season. Roush has won eight championships as a car owner in NASCAR's top three series: two Cup titles (2003 with Matt Kenseth and 2004 with Kurt Busch), five Xfinity Series titles (2002 with Greg Biffle, 2007 with Carl Edwards, 2011–2012 with Stenhouse Jr., and 2015 with Chris Buescher) and a Camping World Truck Series title in 2000 with Biffle. Roush has two Daytona 500 victories as a car owner, both with driver Kenseth in 2009 and 2012. Since Roush entered NASCAR competition his team has 283 wins and 212 poles.

=== Opposition of Toyota ===
Throughout his NASCAR career Roush has been an outspoken opponent of Toyota's NASCAR operations. Roush is vocally loyal to Ford and throughout his career has made cracks against Toyota being in NASCAR. In 2007, Roush entered a verbal feud with Toyota team leader Lee White during the Toyota controversy following the rocket fuel incident.

== Roush Performance ==
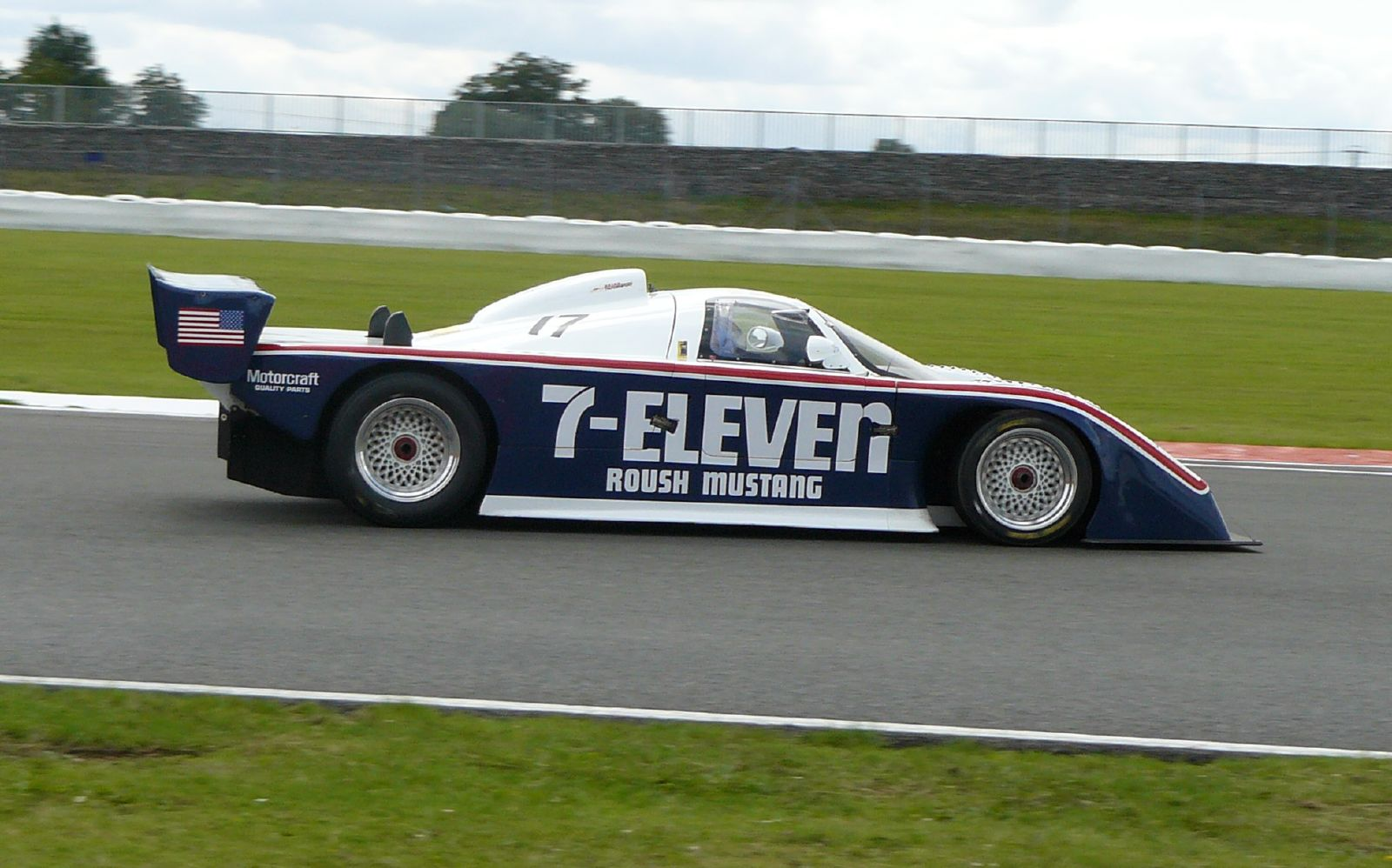
A Roush-engineered Ford Mustang Probe IMSA GTP car.

Roush Performance sells a variety of vehicles, parts, and high-performance crate engines. Perhaps best known for the line of upfitted Ford Mustangs, they have more than 16,000 vehicles on the roads today. Typical improvements on the base chassis include appearance packages (body kit, wheels, etc.), suspension and handling upgrades, and horsepower boosts through the use of a ROUSHcharger supercharger system. ROUSH Performance sells versions of their Mustang with as much as 775 horsepower and 610 lb-ft of torque.

Roush provided the development work and engines for the German V8 S.T.A.R. Series from 2001 to 2003.

== ROUSH CleanTech ==
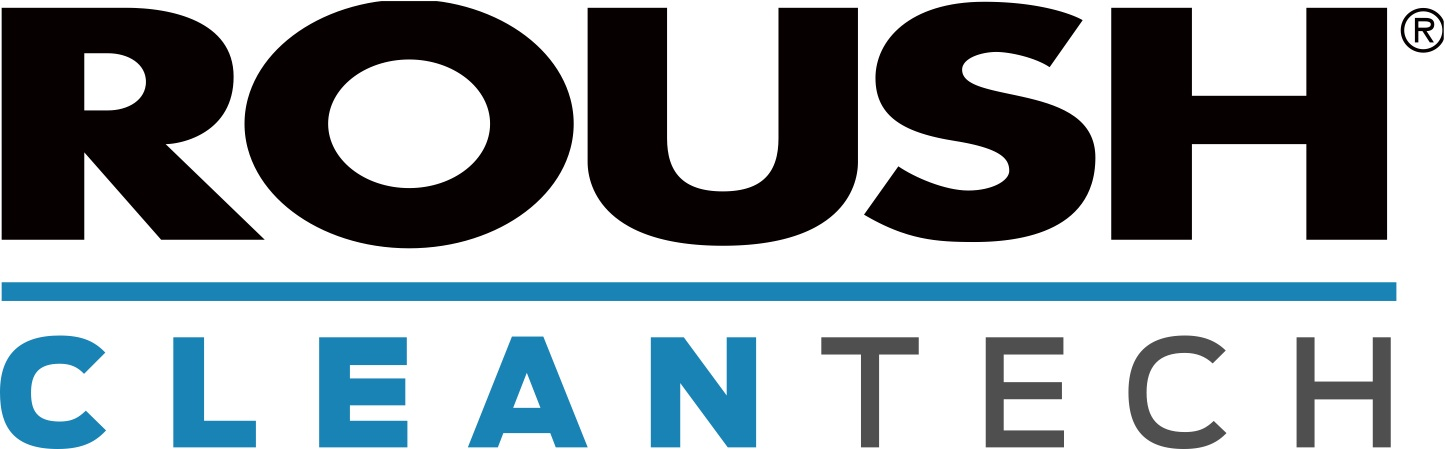
ROUSH CleanTech designs, engineers, manufactures and installs propane autogas fuel systems for Ford vehicles and Blue Bird school buses.

By 2008, Roush expanded into offering propane-autogas-fueled vehicles designed for fleet usage and in 2010, formed ROUSH CleanTech. The company designs, engineers, manufactures and installs clean technology fuel systems, including propane autogas and electric propulsion technology for medium-duty Ford commercial vehicles and Type A and Type C Blue Bird Corporation school buses

== Plane crashes ==
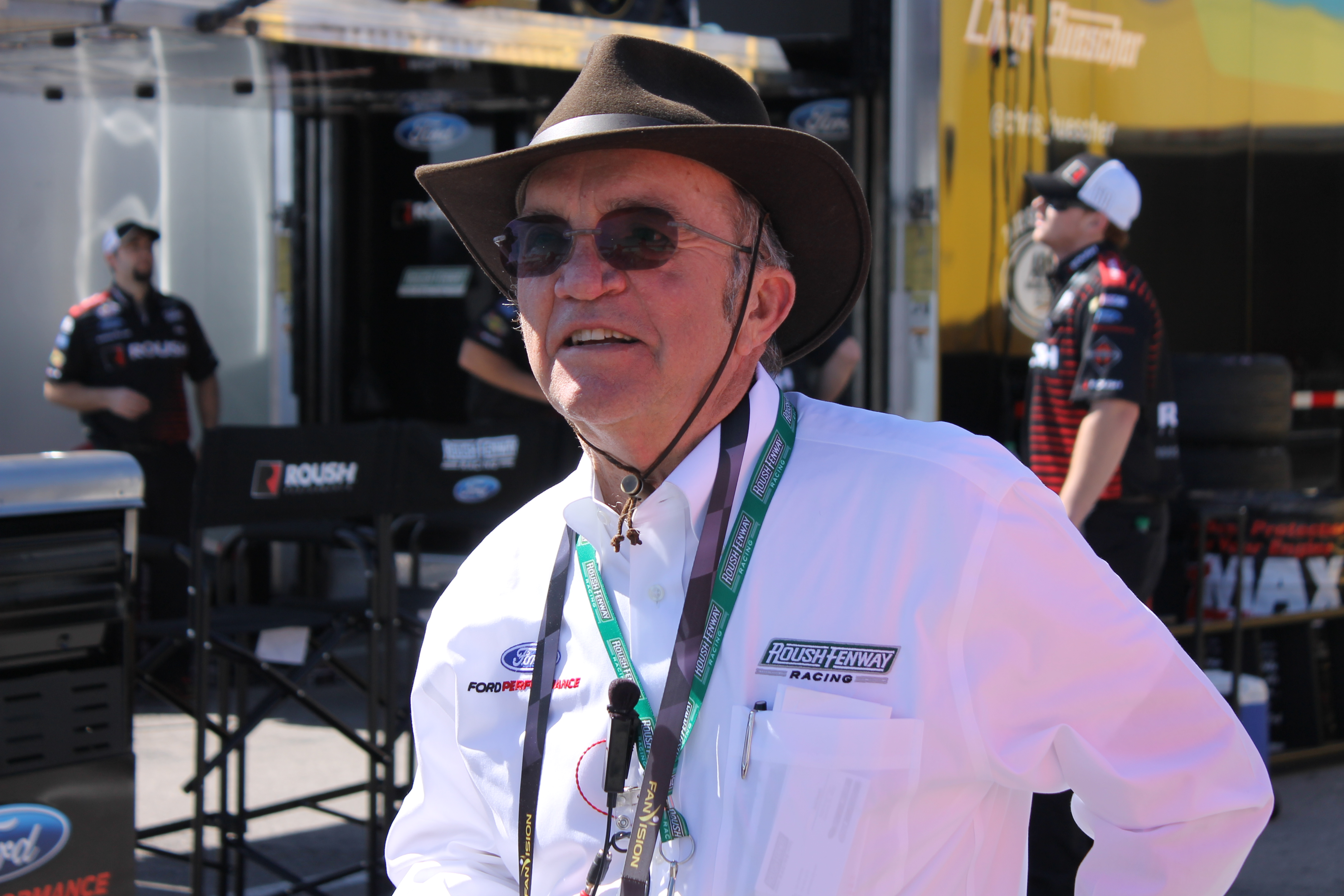
Roush at Las Vegas Motor Speedway in 2015

On April 19, 2002 (his 60th birthday), Roush almost lost his life when his private plane, an Aircam, went down in a lake in Troy, Alabama. Roush was underwater and unconscious, suffering from a concussion, when Larry Hicks, a retired Marine in a nearby boat, rescued Roush from under water, pulled him to safety, and administered CPR. Shortly afterwards, Roush was flown to UAB Hospital in Birmingham, Alabama, where he was treated for a head injury, broken ribs, and a shattered left leg. Hicks was injured as a result of the rescue, suffering cramps in both his arms and first degree chemical burns on his body from the fuel.

On July 27, 2010, Roush crashed his Hawker Beechcraft Premier 390 jet (registration N6JR) during an approach to the EAA AirVenture Oshkosh airshow in Oshkosh, Wisconsin, in the late afternoon. He walked out of the plane and was taken to a nearby hospital. His condition was listed at serious but stable that evening. On August 3, Roush was upgraded to fair condition. On August 13, Roush made his first at track appearance since the incident at the Michigan International Speedway. During that time he confirmed that he fractured his back, broke his jaw, and lost vision in his left eye as a result. The National Transportation Safety Board attributed the cause of the crash to pilot error, specifically, "pilot's decision not to advance the engines to takeoff power during the go-around, as stipulated by the airplane flight manual, which resulted in an aerodynamic stall at a low altitude."
