= I-70 Motorsports Park =

Racetrack

- 1/2 Mile Asphalt Oval (1969–2008)
- Location: Washington Township, Lafayette County, at 12773 North Outer Rd., Odessa, Missouri
- Coordinates: 39°0′38″N 93°52′33″W
- Owner: Chris Payne (July 2018–present)
- Opened: 1969; Re-opened: 2021
- Closed: 2008
- Former names: I-70 Speedway (1969–2008)
- Major events: Current: World of Outlaws (2021–present); Former: NASCAR Craftsman Truck Series; O'Reilly Auto Parts 200 (1995–1999); ASA National Tour (1998–2003); NASCAR Midwest Series (1999–2001); NASCAR Southeast Series (1991–1992, 1994–1998); ARCA Hooters SuperCar Series (1994)
- Website: https://www.i70motorsportspark.com/

3/8 Mile Dirt Oval (2021–present)
- Surface: Dirt
- Length: 0.375 mi (0.604 km)

1/4 Mile Dragstrip (2024–present)
- Surface: Asphalt
- Length: 0.250 mi (0.402 km)

1/2 Mile Asphalt Oval (1969–2008)
- Surface: Asphalt
- Length: 0.500 mi (0.805 km)
- Banking: 30° (corners), 4° (front), 7° (back)

I-70 Motorsports Park, also known as I-70 Speedway, is a multi-purpose motorsports facility near Interstate 70 east of Odessa, Missouri, USA. The track, first opened in 1969, and has since been completely rebuilt and renovated in 2021 under new ownership.

I-70 Speedway includes a 1/2 mile dirt oval racetrack. It hosts events for 410 winged sprint cars, non-winged sprint cars, super dirt late models, modifieds, monster trucks, flat track motorcycles, and motocross bikes.

== History ==
The track was built and opened by Bill Roberts and other partners in 1969. Roberts had previously built and owned the Kansas City International Raceway dragstrip in Kansas City, Missouri.

Roberts sold I-70 Speedway to Greg Weld (of WELD wheels) sometime in the late 1970s or early 1980s (?). Weld turned the track into a dirt track. Late in 1989 Roberts, who had continued holding the note on the track, repossessed I-70 Speedway from Weld. At that time, Roberts, along with sons Dennis and Randy, resurfaced the track with asphalt and got it NASCAR sanctioned. Roberts' third son Dan, a Kansas City area country music DJ on KFKF-FM and later a long-time announcer at Arrowhead Stadium, got his start in sports broadcasting at I-70 Speedway.

In 2006, a new 0.375 mi (0.604 km) dirt track was built on the site. The asphalt track is a long 0.500 mi (0.805 km). The backstretch has a small dog-leg. It is regarded as one of the fastest and highest banked short tracks in the nation. I-70 Speedway was also one of the first tracks to feature a prototypical SAFER barrier; during a World Cup race in the early 1990s, huge styrofoam blocks were placed high along the retaining wall in all four turns. All-Pro Series driver and former NASCAR Rookie of the Year, Jody Ridley, hit one of the blocks which sent him airborne over the wall in turn four upside down. Ridley walked away from the wreck, but this style of the barrier was only used in a few more races at I-70.

I-70 was considered the "home" track of many NASCAR drivers such as Rusty Wallace, Clint Bowyer, and Larry Phillips. James Ince, who was Larry Phillips crew chief and later a NASCAR Crew Chief of the Year with Johnny Benson Jr., also started his career at I-70 Speedway. Other notable drivers who had driven there (not all of them on a full-time basis) included Mark Martin, Butch Miller, Bob Senneker, Dick Trickle, Mike Eddy, Johnny Benson Jr., Jamie McMurray, John O'Neal Jr., track champion Terry Bivins, Jenny White, and Jennifer Jo Cobb. Short track driver Joe Shear once held the 4 barrel Late Model track record. Adam Petty, grandson of Richard Petty, once won an ASA race there.

Actor and race car driver Paul Newman rented the race track in 1990, while he was filming in the Kansas City area, for a private practice session. He drove some of the local race cars including that of the 1989 Late Model Track Champion, Jay Truelove.

Bill Roberts sold the track to Ted Carlson in the mid-1990s. Carlson later sold the track to Brad McDonald. The track has hosted stock car racing and kart racing events. It used to offer a twin-billing Saturday night dirt track and asphalt track show. The dirt track is directly behind the original asphalt facility. On July 5, 2018, it was announced that I-70 Speedway was bought by Chris Payne, owner of Heartland Motorsports Park and would reopen in 2019. The half-mile asphalt oval at I-70 would be converted to a dirt track with a drag strip to be included on the property. After delays due to negotiations with Lafayette County and the COVID-19 pandemic, the new complex reopened in 2021.

In 2023, Chris Payne and his partner entered into an agreement with Scott Higgs to invest in the development of a drag strip on the property next to the 1/2 mile dirt oval track. In May 2023, construction began on the drag strip. The Flying H Drag Strip is set to open to the public in summer of 2024. It was anticipated to host a NHRA Mission Foods Drag Racing Series event in 2024. As of the 2025 NHRA season, no national event has been scheduled.

== Races ==
The major asphalt event held at the track was the World Cup. This event first featured the All-Pro series, but in later years it featured the ASA Late Model Series (formerly known as ARTGO and NASCAR Midwest Series) North vs. South Showdown.

The track hosted the O'Reilly Auto Parts 200 from 1995 to 1999.

The NASCAR Midwest Series (also formerly known as ARTGO) ran 3 races under the NASCAR banner from 1999 to 2001. The track also hosted 7 NASCAR Southeast Series events between 1991 and 1998.

The ARCA Racing Series had raced one race in I-70 Speedway in 1994 and was won by Randy Churchill. The ASA National Tour had a 300-lap race in the facility from 1998 until 2003. All the six winners of ASA National Tour races drove in NASCAR: Adam Petty, Mike Miller, Tim Sauter, Johnny Sauter, Joey Clanton and Mike Garvey.

World of Outlaws announced in December 2019 that they would return to I-70 in 2020, on a new 0.375 mi (0.604 km) oval layout, surfaced with dirt. The effort was delayed a year by the COVID-19 pandemic, but a grand opening of the track featuring World of Outlaws occurred on April 30, 2021.

Since the 2021 reopening, the All Star Circuit of Champions, USAC National Sprint Car Championship, POWRi Lucas Oil WAR Sprint League, Lucas Oil American Sprint Car Series and Lucas Oil Late Model Dirt Series have also raced at I-70.
