= Mike Eddy =

American stock car racing driver; seven-time ASA champion (1952–2025)

- Nationality: American
- Born: July 17, 1952 Midland, Michigan, U.S.
- Died: May 29, 2025 (aged 72)
- Retired: 2007
- Relatives: Travis Eddy (son)

American Speed Association
- Years active: 1972–2002, 2004
- Teams: Mike Eddy Racing; Moenning Brothers
- Starts: 470
- Wins: 58
- Poles: 34
- Best finish: 1st in 1974, 1976, 1981, 1982, 1989, 1991, and 1992

Championship titles
- 1974 1976 1981 1982 1989 1991 1992: ASA National Tour Champion; ASA National Tour Champion; ASA National Tour Champion; ASA National Tour Champion; ASA National Tour Champion; ASA National Tour Champion; ASA National Tour Champion

Awards
- 1970 1995: MARC Times Rookie of the Year; Michigan Motor Sports Hall of Fame

Michael Eddy (July 17, 1952 – May 29, 2025) was an American stock car auto racer. He was most notable for having raced in the American Speed Association (ASA). He was a seven-time ASA National Champion, which is the most in ASA history. During his run in ASA Eddy drove the number 88 car.

== ASA ==
Eddy won his seven championships in 1974, 1976, 1981, 1982, 1989, 1991, and 1992. In addition to this he was ASA's all-time career leader in laps lead, starts, and top-tens. Eddy also ranks second in all-time victories with 58 and second on the all-time earnings list. During his championship season of 1992, he led 2,183 laps that year, which was a single-season record. Eddy recorded his 58th victory on June 12, 2004, at the Berlin Raceway in Marne, Michigan after a two-year absence from auto racing. Eddy was known to be an aggressive driver who wasn't shy about nudging slower cars out of his way.

== Offers from NASCAR teams ==
Because of the success that he had achieved in ASA, Eddy received several offers from NASCAR teams, turning them down each time. In the early 1990s, he was offered the No. 75 car by RahMoc Enterprises, which was a prominent Winston Cup Series ride at the time. He turned it down because his GM Goodwrench deal in ASA came along at the same time.

A few years later, Eddy was offered to drive the No. 43 truck for Petty Enterprises for the 1996 Craftsman Truck Series season, but once again had to turn down the offer due to his contract with GM Goodwrench at the time.

== Personal life and death ==
Eddy had a wife named Patsy; they had two sons; Matthew, and Travis. He died on May 29, 2025, at the age of 72 from cancer.

== Awards ==
Eddy was inducted into the Michigan Motor Sports Hall of Fame in 1995.

Sporting positions
Preceded by Dave Sorg	ASA National Tour Champion; 1974	Succeeded by Rodney Combs
Preceded by Rodney Combs	ASA National Tour Champion; 1976	Succeeded by Rodney Combs
Preceded by Mark Martin	ASA National Tour Champion; 1981, 1982	Succeeded by Rusty Wallace
Preceded by Butch Miller	ASA National Tour Champion; 1989	Succeeded by Bob Senneker
Preceded by Bob Senneker	ASA National Tour Champion; 1991, 1992	Succeeded by Johnny Benson
