= American Speed Association =

Motorsports organization of the United States

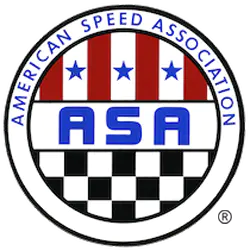
- Sport: Auto racing, Stock car racing
- Jurisdiction: United States
- Abbreviation: ASA
- Founded: 1968 (original); 2022 (revival)
- Owner: Marty Melo
- Closure date: 2013 (original)

The American Speed Association (ASA) is a sanctioning body of motorsports in the United States formed in 1968 by Rex Robbins. The Association was based in Pendleton, Indiana, and later in Daytona Beach, Florida. The ASA sanctioned asphalt in their ASA Member Track program along with racing series in the United States and Canada. The ASA currently sanctions the STARS National Tour, the Midwest Tour, the Southern Super Series and all CRA sanctioned series.

The ASA was most famous for a national touring series which began in 1973 but was sold in 2003 to Steve Dale. Money troubles happened in 2004. In 2005, ASA became primarily a short track sanctioning clearinghouse under the leadership of Dennis Huth.

The cars from the ASA National tour also raced in England in the now-defunct Stock Car Speed Association (formally ASCAR).

On December 10, 2022, racing promoter Track Enterprises announced that the ASA would make a return to sanction the 2023 ASA STARS National Tour, a super late model racing series, under a licensing agreement with ARCA. Previous to the announcement, the organization had not been active since 2014. A few months later, the ASA purchased CRA and the Midwest Tour as well as partnering with the Southern Super Series.

== ASA National Tour ==
The national touring series held until 2004 used late model racecar body styles, where they raced primarily in the Midwest. Many series races were televised on several cable channels (especially The Nashville Network) beginning from 1991.

ASA is notable as the only nationally touring stock car series that used passenger car technology for its racing engines. Unlike NASCAR, which up until 2012 required carbureted engines for all its nationally touring series, ASA required fuel injection in all of its engines. During the mid-1980s, it also became one of the first stock car groups to offer a six-cylinder, lower-price alternative to the popular V8 engines, designed for less power but more race-capable for drivers. Following the 2000 rule changes, it was also known for introducing crate motors to a national audience. (NASCAR adopted crate motors in 2006 for the Grand National Division, presently known as the ARCA Menards Series East and ARCA Menards Series West.)

In 1991, Gaylord Entertainment (owners of The Nashville Network) and an independent production company, Group Five Sports, signed an agreement where the ASA would add live race broadcasts to their schedule.

The first live ASA ACDelco Challenge Series race was held in June 1991 at Nashville Speedway USA. The race featured NASCAR star Darrell Waltrip (who won the ASA's first Challenge of Champions race in 1972) defeating ASA regular Bob Senneker. The exposure led to national television coverage for the entire season by TNN and Group Five doing the production.

In 1999, CBS (which purchased TNN in 1997) officials announced the purchase of 25% of the American Speed Association from owner Rex Robbins in exchange for live television rights to the entire ASA ACDelco Series schedule for five years. CBS made this move after losing coverage of NASCAR races, and the network chose to market the ASA on its CBS Cable family of networks (TNN and CMT).

=== MTV lawsuit ===
When Viacom took over TNN in 2000, CBS Cable operations were shut down as TNN's Charlotte and Nashville offices were closed and the signals transferred to MTV Networks for the creation of a channel, Spike TV. At the time, MTV Networks honored its remaining motorsports contracts signed by CBS.

In August 2001, MTV ended its association with ASA and the World of Outlaws (which also had a TNN contract signed by CBS management) by announcing they would tape delay the popular sprint car Knoxville Nationals, and also tape delay the two remaining ASA ACDelco Series races. The ASA filed a lawsuit in an attempt to stop the tape delays, but dropped the lawsuit after MTV agreed to air one of the two races in the lawsuit live. MTV terminated the five-year CBS contract after less than 20 months.

Brian Robbins, the son of the ASA founder Rex Robbins, blasted MTV, saying, "It appears new (MTV) management does not have the same vision for the partnership as we had with TNN (CBS Cable) at the time we made the agreement."

== Sale to Steve Dale ==
The 2003 ASA National Tour season had drastic changes because of the move of television coverage to the lower-rated (but motorsports-focused) Speed Channel. Robbins ended his involvement with ASA.

Car owner Steve Dale, along with a group of investors, purchased the ASA at the end of the 2003 season, and began massive changes for 2004 hoping for further expansion of the series.

The ASA then further expanded its Member Track program, hoping to deliver tracks to their side with a lower sanctioning fee than rival NASCAR's sanctioning fees. ASA did not have the high-dollar or high-exposure status NASCAR's Dodge Weekly Series offered.

Under Steve Dale, the ASA purchased a fairly new Midwest-based late model series called the US Pro Series. The series used "crate" engines and "template" bodies to help develop a new "Approved Body Configuration" template for race cars. The standardized bodies saved money for teams at every track which wasn't a NASCAR-sanctioned track. The US Pro Series was renamed to the ASA Late Model Series. When the new ASA Late Model series began, it debuted with Matt Kenseth and Tony Stewart racing in the inaugural race under the new name and ownership.

The ASA also purchased the Southern Modified Auto Racing Teams (SMART), a modified racing organization, and the Speed Truck Challenge, a West Coast-based short-track series using compact pickup truck-shaped fiberglass bodies, in hopes to help sanction both series.

Car liveries began to take a new look in 2004, with the cars having numbers on the rear fenders and sponsors on the door, which is opposite of what most stock cars traditionally have used.

Despite these expansion attempts, financial problems developed midway in the 2004 season when the ASA began to cancel National Tour races and television contracts. By the end of the season, the series' demise came when the series raced at Lowe's Motor Speedway. In October 2004, during the driver's meeting for the 99-lap Aaron's 99 event (held after NASCAR Nextel Cup qualifying for the UAW-GM Quality 500), they informed competitors they did not have funds to pay teams after the race, and they asked for an extension. This despite the fact that Lowe's Motor Speedway had wired the entire purse and sanction fee to ASA as per the sanction agreement. Disappointed by Steve Dale's decision to cancel his trip to the event, the track impounded ASA's vehicles and equipment. A settlement was made where Speedway Motorsports, Inc. (owners of Atlanta Motor Speedway and Lowe's Motor Speedway) decided to pay the competitors directly after the final ASA race at Atlanta.

The sanctioning body collapsed and was shut down after the 2004 season, and the National Tour folded.

== Dennis Huth era ==
After the National Tour folded, ASA's Member Track program and asaracing.com domain were sold to Racing Speed Associates, which was run by former NASCAR official Dennis Huth, along with other ASA-sanctioned short track programs, the ASA Midwest Tour, ASA Midwest Truck Tour, ASA Truck Series, ASA Pro Truck Series, ASA ProAutoSports, ASA Advance Testing British Columbia Late Model Tour and the ASA NW Sprint Car Series (NSRA).

NASCAR took advantage of the demise of the organization and started a Modified series in the Southeast, the Whelen Southern Modified Tour. The series features identical rules to NASCAR's northern brethren, which it merged with in 2017. In response, the Racing Speed Associates started the ASA Southern Modified Racing Team concept to once again bring modifieds to the ASA.

The American Stockcar League (which used the ASA formula cars) was run under the sanctioning of Mid-American Racing in an effort to keep the National Tour active. The ASL ran only four races before its founder, Gary Vercauteren, died from a heart attack on October 6, 2005. Technical director and former racer Doug Strasburg took over Mid-American Racing, but conducted a major house cleaning early in 2006 and pared down Mid-American Racing, ending the ASL after only one season.

After NASCAR announced it was ending its AutoZone Elite divisions, which featured regional late model racing, following the 2006 season, the ASA began sanctioning replacement series around the United States. The ASA Midwest Tour and ASA Northwest Tour were launched for 2007 and the ASA Southeast Asphalt Tour for 2008. The sanctioning of the Midwest Tour was given to ARCA in 2013, becoming the ARCA Midwest Tour, which indirectly reunited the series with NASCAR after the purchase of ARCA in 2018.

In 2008, ASA began sanctioning the ISCARS sport compact series, which had been independent since breaking from NASCAR at the end of the 2003 season. Also, the ASA Member Track program added a national short-track points championship similar to NASCAR's Whelen All-American Series concept, with the winner receiving a test with Joe Gibbs Racing, which sponsors the program through its Joe Gibbs Driven Racing Oil brand. The ASA sanctioning of the former Goody's Dash Series took place until 2011.

=== ASA Free State 500 ===
On January 31, 2010, ASA Racing made history as the first American sanctioning body to race in the Republic of South Africa. The ASA Free State 500 took place at the Phakisa Freeway located in Welkom, Free State, South Africa; it was also the first major race to be hosted on the circuit's oval. Contested using used fourth-generation Cup cars, John Mickel from the United Kingdom passed Toni McCray from California on the last lap to win the 207-lap (500 km) event.

The Free State 500 was planned as part of the ASA Transcontinental Series, a track championship hosted at Phakisa Freeway's oval. However, no further races were ever held.

== Naming dispute ==
The related split of the assets of the former American Speed Association led to a naming dispute when the Late Model Series was reacquired by Ron Varney, while the other portions of the American Speed Association were sold to Huth.

On December 4, 2007, Dennis Huth filed a lawsuit against the ASA Late Model Series seeking to invalidate and cancel the ASA Late Model Series trademark registration. The ASA Late Model Series responded that the lawsuit is frivolous and without merit and counter-sued Huth for damages caused by suit.

On January 14, 2009, the naming dispute was settled. Both parties were allowed to keep the "ASA" name, but the ASA Late Model Series was forced to come up with a new logo, and both parties agreed to inform the racing public that the ASA Late Model Series is not related to, affiliated with, nor sponsored or endorsed by American Speed Association or ASA Racing.

On October 11, 2010, it was announced that in an order signed on October 7, 2010, by US District Court Judge Matthew Kennelly, has permanently barred Louis R. (Ron) Varney, Jr, ASA Late Model Series, LLC and all those acting in concert or participation with them, including specifically ASALMS, LLC from any further use of the ASA or ASA Late Model Series brand on or in connection with automobile race events anywhere in the United States. The injunction was delivered at the 2010 Oktoberfest Race Weekend at the La Crosse Fairgrounds Speedway. The Varney-led organization has not been active following the injunction.

== 2025 ASA STARS National Tour Schedule ==
Date	Track	Location	Winner
February 11	New Smyrna Speedway	New Smyrna Beach, Florida	Gavan Boschele
March 23	Five Flags Speedway	Pensacola, Florida	Cole Butcher
April 5	Dominion Raceway (Note: Co-sanctioned race with ASA/CRA Super Series, results will count towards both championships.)	Thornburg, Virginia	Cole Butcher
May 22	Hickory Motor Speedway	Hickory, North Carolina	Colby Howard
May 24	Newport Speedway	Newport, Tennessee	Derek Kraus
June 13	Madison International Speedway	Oregon, Wisconsin	
June 15	Slinger Speedway	Slinger, Wisconsin	
July 26	Anderson Speedway (Note: Redbud 400 Co-sanctioned race with ASA/CRA Super Series, results will count towards both championships.)	Anderson, Indiana	
August 20	Owosso Speedway (Note: Co-sanctioned race with ASA/CRA Super Series, results will count towards both championships.)	Ovid, Michigan	
September 13	Toledo Speedway (Note: Co-sanctioned race with ASA/CRA Super Series, results will count towards both championships.)	Toledo, Ohio	
October 12	Winchester Speedway (Note: Winchester 400 Co-sanctioned race with ASA/CRA Super Series, results will count towards both championships.)	Winchester, Indiana	
November 9	Nashville Fairgrounds Speedway (Note: All American 400 Co-sanctioned race with ASA/CRA Super Series and ASA Southern Super Series, non-championship event for CRA and SSS.)	Nashville, Tennessee	

== 2025 ASA Southern Super Series Schedule ==
Date	Track	Location	Winner
January 17 (Note: Race moved from January 18 due to threat of weather.)	Cordele Speedway (Note: Co-sanctioned race with ASA/CRA Super Series, non-championship event for CRA Super Series.)	Cordele, Georgia	Bubba Pollard
February 11	New Smyrna Speedway (Note: Co-sanctioned race with STARS National Tour, results will count towards both championships.)	New Smyrna, Florida	Gavan Boschele
March 21	Five Flags Speedway (Note: Co-sanctioned race with STARS National Tour, results will count towards both championships.)	Pensacola, Florida	Cole Butcher
April 11	Five Flags Speedway	Pensacola, Florida	Cole Butcher
April 12	Mobile International Speedway	Mobile, Alabama	Bubba Pollard
May 3	Nashville Fairgrounds Speedway (Note: Co-sanctioned race with ASA/CRA Super Series, results will count towards both championships.)	Nashville, Tennessee	Cole Butcher
May 22	Hickory Motor Speedway (Note: Co-sanctioned race with STARS National Tour, results will count towards both championships.)	Hickory, North Carolina	Colby Howard
May 24	Newport Speedway (Note: Co-sanctioned race with STARS National Tour, results will count towards both championships.)	Newport, Tennessee	Derek Kraus
June 7	Montgomery Motor Speedway	Montgomery, Alabama	
June 27	Five Flags Speedway	Pensacola, Florida	
August 2	Mobile International Speedway	Mobile, Alabama	
September 27	Five Flags Speedway	Pensacola, Florida	
November 8	New Smyrna Speedway (Note: Florida Governor's Cup will be season finale for SSS and the track.)	New Smyrna Speedway	
November 9	Nashville Fairgrounds Speedway (Note: All American 400 co-sanctioned race with STARS National Tour and ASA/CRA Super Series, non-championship event for SSS and CRA.)	Nashville, Tennessee	

== List of ASA National Champions ==
- 2025: Cole Butcher
- 2024: Casey Roderick
- 2023: Ty Majeski
- 2013: Dalton Zehr - ASA Member Track National Champion - Norway Speedway
- 2012: Shelby Stroebel - ASA Member Track National Champion - Meridian Speedway
- 2011: Barry Beggarly - ASA Member Track National Champion - Ace Speedway
- 2010: Bryan Wordelman - ASA Member Track National Champion - Rocky Mountain Raceways
- 2009: Tommy Cloce - ASA Member Track National Champion - Adirondack Speedway
- 2008: Cary Stapp - ASA Member Track National Champion - Thunderhill Raceway
- 2005: Bryan Reffner (2) - Awarded Championship for the 2005 ASL Season
- 2004: Kevin Cywinski (3)
- 2003: Kevin Cywinski (2)
- 2002: Joey Clanton
- 2001 Johnny Sauter
- 2000: Gary St. Amant (2)
- 1999: Tim Sauter
- 1998 Gary St. Amant
- 1997: Kevin Cywinski
- 1996: Tony Raines
- 1995: Bryan Reffner
- 1994: Butch Miller (3)
- 1993: Johnny Benson
- 1992: Mike Eddy (7)
- 1991: Mike Eddy (6)
- 1990: Bob Senneker
- 1989: Mike Eddy (5)
- 1988: Butch Miller (2)
- 1987: Butch Miller
- 1986: Mark Martin (4)
- 1985: Dick Trickle (2)
- 1984: Dick Trickle
- 1983: Rusty Wallace
- 1982: Mike Eddy (4)
- 1981: Mike Eddy (3)
- 1980: Mark Martin (3)
- 1979: Mark Martin (2)
- 1978: Mark Martin
- 1977: Dave Watson
- 1976: Mike Eddy (2)
- 1975: Moose Myers
- 1974: Mike Eddy
- 1973: Dave Sorg

== Pat Schauer Memorial Rookies of the Year ==
The Pat Schauer Memorial Rookies of the Year is named after Pat Schauer, of Watertown, Wisconsin, who was killed October 4, 1981, at Winchester Speedway during an ASA race. Schauer was the rookie point leader at the time.

- 2005 Brian Campbell (for American Stockcar League)
- 2004 Brett Sontag
- 2003 Reed Sorenson
- 2002 David Stremme
- 2001 Johnny Sauter
- 2000 Joey Clanton
- 1999 Rick Johnson
- 1998 Jimmie Johnson
- 1997 Steve Carlson
- 1996 Kevin Cywinski
- 1995 Rick Beebe
- 1994 Dave Sensiba
- 1993 Randy MacDonald
- 1992 Steve Holzhausen
- 1991 Tim Fedewa
- 1990 Johnny Benson
- 1989 Scott Hansen
- 1988 Jeff Neal
- 1987 Ted Musgrave
- 1986 Kenny Wallace
- 1985 Russ Urlin
- 1984 Ken Lund
- 1983 Muttly Kurkowski
- 1982 Harold Fair Sr.
- 1981 Pat Schauer (awarded posthumously)
- 1980 Ryl Magoon
- 1979 Bob Strait
- 1978 Alan Kulwicki
- 1977 Mark Martin
- 1976 Larry Schuler
- 1975 None named
- 1974 David Cope
- 1973 Kenny Simpson

== Other notable alumni drivers ==
- Jimmie Johnson
- Kyle Busch
- Scott Hansen
- Matt Kenseth
- Todd Kluever
- Alan Kulwicki
- Adam Petty
- Jay Sauter
- Jim Sauter
- Joe Shear
- Chris Wimmer
- Scott Wimmer

== Former ASA member tracks ==
- Ace Speedway
- Big Country Speedway
- Desoto Super Speedway
- Dillon Motor Speedway
- East Bay Raceway Park
- Hartford Motor Speedway
- Hawkeye Downs Speedway
- Havasu 95 Speedway
- I-25 Speedway
- Illiana Motor Speedway
- INDE Motorsports Ranch
- Lebanon I-44 Speedway
- Lonesome Pine Raceway
- Marshfield Motor Speedway
- Meridian Speedway
- Newport Motor Speedway
- Rocky Mountain Raceways
- Shangri-La II Motor Speedway
- Shasta Speedway
- Skagit Speedway
- Southern Oregon Speedway
- State Park Speedway
- Toledo Speedway
- Virginia Motor Speedway
- Yakima Speedway

== Tracks that hosted ASA national events (2004 and earlier) ==
- Anderson Speedway (home of the Little 500 sprint car race run the night before the Indianapolis 500)
- Atlanta Motor Speedway (hosted the final ever ASA National Tour event in 2004)
- Auto City Speedway
- Baer Field Raceway
- Berlin Raceway
- Birmingham Super Speedway
- Brainerd International Raceway
- Cayuga Speedway (now known as Jukasa Motor Speedway)
- Chicago Motor Speedway
- Colorado National Speedway
- Columbus Motor Speedway (Hosted the season opener throughout the early-to-mid 1990s. The field for the 200-lap feature was set by twin 50-lap qualifying races, the only event on the schedule to utilize this format.)
- Elko Speedway
- Five Flags Speedway (Home of the Snowball Derby)
- Gateway Motorsports Park (currently World Wide Technology Raceway and formerly Gateway International Raceway and Gateway Motorsports Park)
- Hawkeye Downs Speedway (first track to participate in the ASA Member Track Program in 2001)
- Heartland Park Topeka
- Hickory Motor Speedway
- Houston Motor Speedway (now Houston Motorsports Park)
- I-70 Speedway
- Illiana Motor Speedway
- Indianapolis Raceway Park
- Irwindale Speedway (home of the NASCAR Toyota All-Star Showdown from 2003–present)
- Jennerstown Speedway
- La Crosse Fairgrounds Speedway
- Lanier Raceplex (formerly Lanier Raceway and Lanier National Speedway)
- Lonesome Pine Raceway
- Louisville Motor Speedway
- Lowe's Motor Speedway
- Madison International Speedway (hosted the first-ever ASA Late Model Series event in 2005)
- Mansfield Motorsports Speedway
- Memphis International Raceway (formerly known as Memphis Motorsports Park)
- Michigan International Speedway (held the first ASA race on a superspeedway in 1982)
- The Milwaukee Mile Former name is Wisconsin State Fair Park. (the largest track that the ASA normally raced on annually)
- Minnesota State Fair Speedway (hosted the ASA annually on Labor Day weekend from 1978 to 2002; race moved to Elko Speedway in 2003)
- Montgomery Motor Speedway
- Mosport Park (road course)
- Music City Motorplex (formerly Nashville Speedway USA)
- Peach State Speedway
- Pikes Peak International Raceway
- Pontiac Silverdome (Hosted season opener in 1983)
- Queen City Speedway
- Race City Speedway (Calgary, Alberta, Canada; hosted several 500-lap ASA races. The last one was shorted due to a freak mid-summer snow storm)
- Salem Speedway
- Sanair Super Speedway
- Sandusky Speedway
- Slinger Super Speedway
- Southern National Speedway
- Toledo Speedway
- Tri-City Motor Speedway
- USA International Speedway (former home track of the USAR Hooters ProCup Series)
- Winchester Speedway
- Wisconsin International Raceway

== See also ==
- ACT
- CRA
- CRA Super Series
- CARS Tour
- PASS
- SRL Southwest Tour
