= Johnny Benson Jr. =

American racing driver (born 1963)

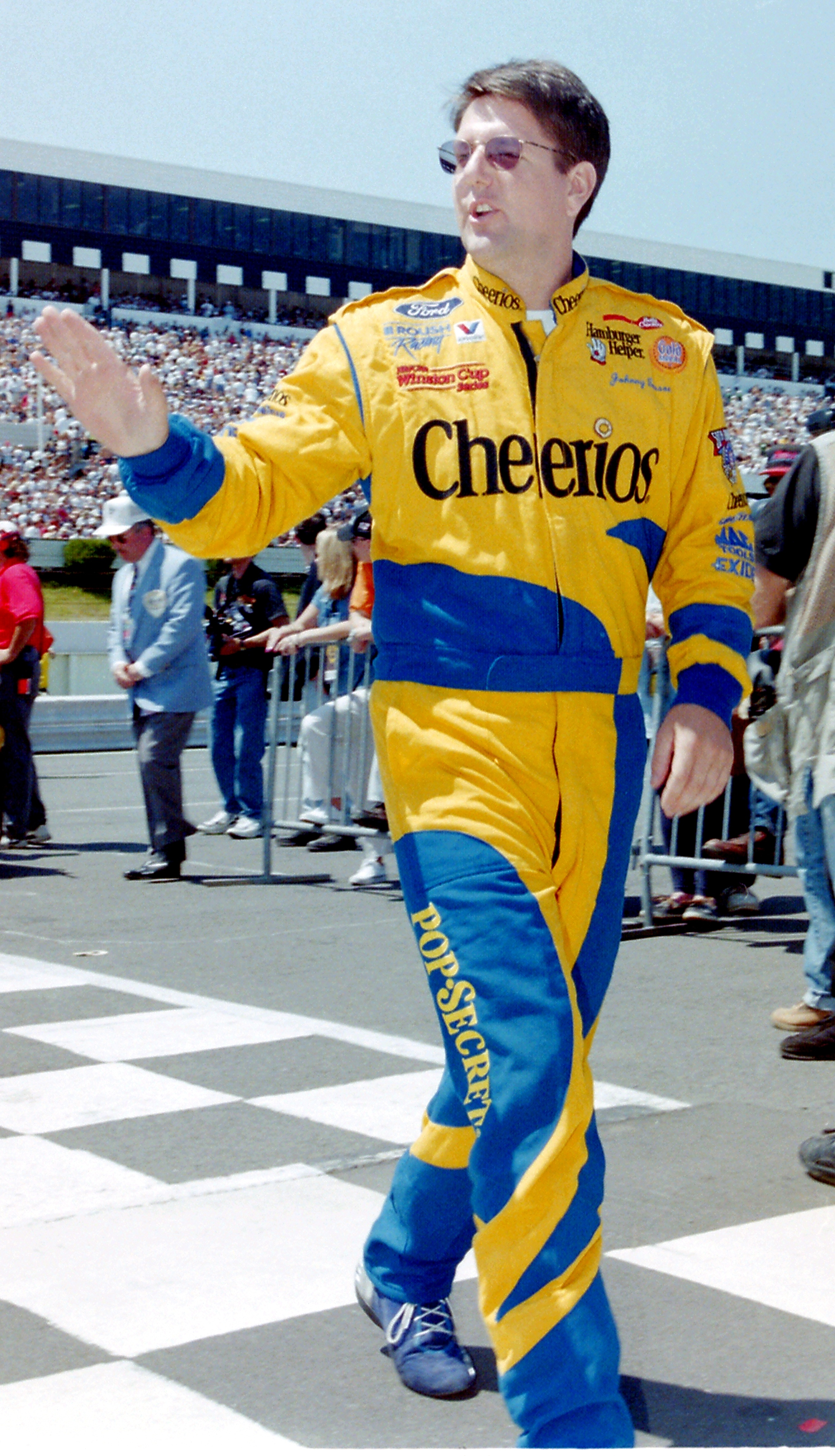
- Benson in 1998
- Born: June 27, 1963 (age 63); Grand Rapids, Michigan, U.S.
- Achievements: 1995 Busch Series Champion; 2008 Craftsman Truck Series Champion; 1993 ASA National Tour Champion
- Awards: 1996 Winston Cup Series Rookie of the Year; 1994 Busch Series Rookie of the Year; 1990 ASA National Tour Rookie of the Year; 2006, 2007, 2008 Craftsman Truck Series Most Popular Driver

NASCAR Cup Series career
- 274 races run over 11 years
- Best finish: 11th (1997, 2001)
- First race: 1996 Daytona 500 (Daytona)
- Last race: 2007 Ford 400 (Homestead)
- First win: 2002 Pop Secret Microwave Popcorn 400 (Rockingham)
| Wins | Top tens | Poles |
|---|---|---|
| 1 | 58 | 2 |

NASCAR O'Reilly Auto Parts Series career
- 91 races run over 10 years
- Best finish: 1st (1995)
- First race: 1993 Detroit Gasket 200 (Michigan)
- Last race: 2007 AT&T 250 (Milwaukee)
- First win: 1994 SplitFire 200 (Dover)
- Last win: 1995 Sundrop 400 (Hickory)
| Wins | Top tens | Poles |
|---|---|---|
| 3 | 35 | 1 |

NASCAR FedEx Freight Truck Series career
- 138 races run over 10 years
- Best finish: 1st (2008)
- First race: 1995 Skoal Bandit Copper World Classic (Phoenix)
- Last race: 2010 WinStar World Casino 400K (Texas)
- First win: 2006 Con-way Freight 200 (Michigan)
- Last win: 2008 Kroger 200 (Martinsville)
| Wins | Top tens | Poles |
|---|---|---|
| 14 | 90 | 5 |

NASCAR Canada Series career
- 1 race run over 1 year
- First race: 2002 Canada Day Shootout (Hamilton)
- Last race: 2002 Canada Day Shootout (Hamilton)
| Wins | Top tens | Poles |
|---|---|---|
| 0 | 0 | 0 |
- Statistics up to date as of June 7, 2014.

Jonathan Frederick Benson Jr. (born June 27, 1963) is an American retired stock car racing driver and the son of former Michigan modified driver John Benson Sr. Benson has raced across NASCAR's three national series (Cup, Busch, Truck), and his career highlights include the 1993 American Speed Association AC-Delco Challenge series championship, the 1995 NASCAR Busch Series championship, the 1996 NASCAR Winston Cup Series Rookie of the Year Award, and the 2008 NASCAR Craftsman Truck Series championship.

Benson, who began his NASCAR career in 1993, is the second of only three drivers that have won a championship in both the Busch Series and the Craftsman Truck Series, and the seventeenth of only thirty-six drivers to win a race in each of NASCAR's three national series.

== Early career ==
Benson was born in Grand Rapids, Michigan. He graduated from Forest Hills Northern High School in 1981. He became a late model champion at Berlin Raceway in Marne, Michigan before joining the American Speed Association (ASA) in 1990. During Benson's rookie season in the ASA he captured one pole position, led 174 laps and scored eight top-ten finishes to blitz the competition for the ASA's Pat Schauer Rookie of the Year award. In 1991, Benson compiled 13 top-tens including four second-place finishes. Benson ranked fourth in the ASA AC-Delco Challenge Series in 1991. Benson later went on to win the 1993 ASA championship. During his time in the ASA Series, he drove the No. 21 Valvoline Chevrolet for Throop Motorsports.

== NASCAR career ==
=== 1993–1999 ===
In 1993, Benson made his Busch Series debut at Michigan International Speedway, driving the No. 41 Delco Remy Chevrolet for Ernie Irvan. He started 20th, but finished 40th after an early crash when he had flipped in the race. He ran three more races that season in the No. 74 Staff America Chevy for BACE Motorsports, qualifying 3rd at Hickory Motor Speedway. His best finish was 18th at Atlanta Motor Speedway.

Benson was hired to drive full-time for BACE in 1994. He won his first career race at the SplitFire 200 and finished 6th in points, winning Rookie of the Year honors. The following season, Benson won early in the season at Atlanta and Hickory and had nineteen Top 10 finishes, winning the championship. He also began running in the Truck Series in the No. 18 Performance Friction Chevrolet C/K for Kurt Roehrig. In his first season, his best finish was 2nd at Indianapolis Raceway Park. The following season, he won the pole at North Wilkesboro Speedway.

In 1996, Benson moved up to the Winston Cup Series, a series Benson's father John Benson Sr. competed in for one race back in 1973. He joined the No. 30 Pennzoil team owned by Bahari Racing. He failed to qualify for one race at the Food City 500, but won the 1996 NASCAR Winston Cup Rookie of the Year title. He won one pole at Atlanta Motor Speedway. In August, he dominated the Brickyard 400 before a problem on the last pit stop ended his chances for victory. He ended the season with seven Top 10's and was 21st in points. He was invited to the 1996 International Race of Champions as the reigning Busch Series champion, and finished 3rd in the final points, finishing in the Top 10 in all four races.

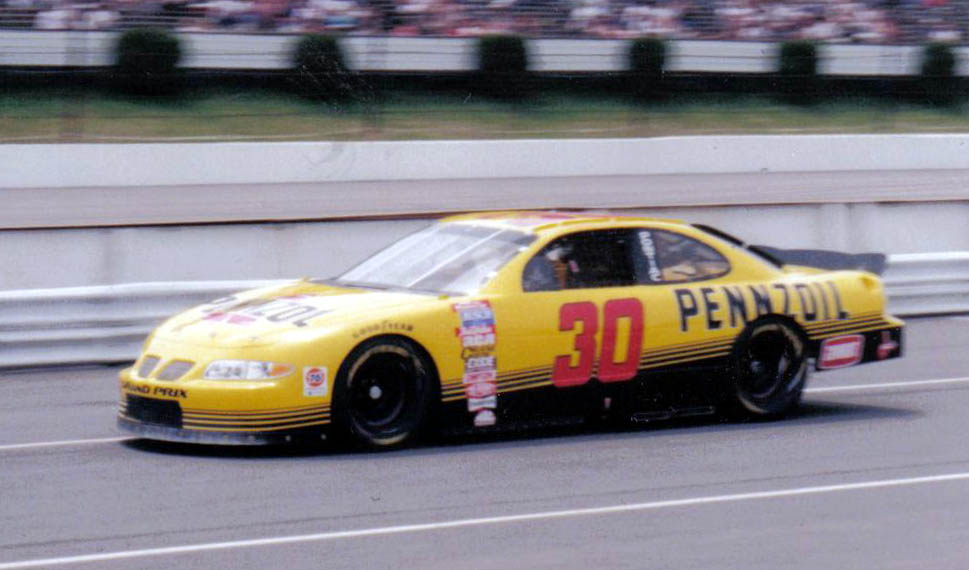
1997 racecar

In 1997, Benson had eight Top 10's, but did not finish in the Top 5 once. He won his second career pole at Michigan and finished outside of the Top 10 by one point to Ken Schrader. At the end of the season, he announced he would be joining Roush Racing to run the brand-new No. 26 General Mills/Cheerios Ford Taurus.

Benson missed the season opening Daytona 500, then finished 30th at the following race. He then had a streak of no finishes worse than 9th over the next five races and rose as high as 10th in points, before he finished 38th and 41st in the next two races. For the rest of the season, his best finish was 9th and he qualified no higher than 2nd. He finished 20th in points. Benson had numerous crew chiefs in 1999. He had two Top 10 finishes and finished 28th in points. After a long negotiation, he was able to buy out his contract and announced he would leave Roush.

=== 2000–2003 ===
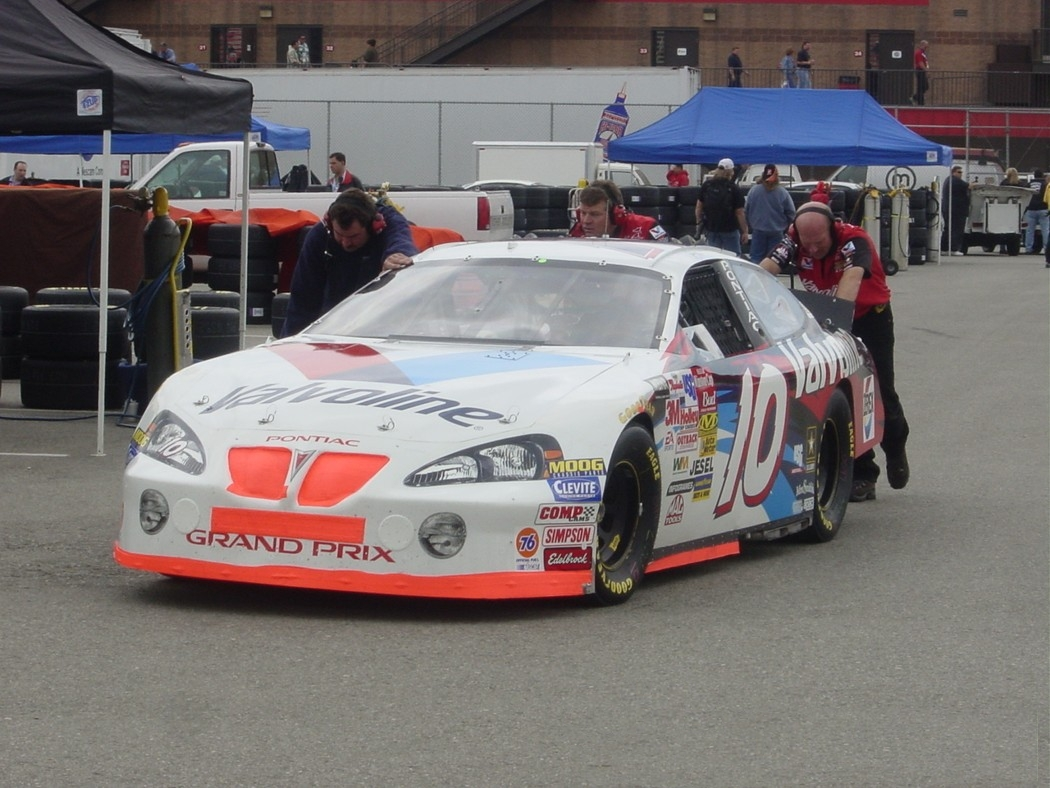
The No. 10 at the 2003 Auto Club 500

At the start of the 2000 Winston Cup season, Benson found himself without a sponsor when he signed on to join Tyler Jet Motorsports to run the No. 10 car. The team showed up at Daytona Speedweeks with a white unsponsored Pontiac Grand Prix. Lycos signed on to be the team's sponsor for the year on the morning of the Daytona 500. During the race, Benson and crew chief James Ince gambled on a late pitstop when they took only two right side tires and fuel, to come out with the lead with 43 laps to go. He held off the field until a multi-car crash brought out the caution in the final ten laps. On the restart with four laps to go, Benson was leading with Dale Jarrett and Jeff Burton right behind. Jarrett bumped Benson, sending him up the track going into turn 1, then passed him for the win while Benson slid back in twelfth. Benson finished 6th in the third race at the Las Vegas Motor Speedway, and was 11th in points. At the next race at Atlanta, Benson did not qualify in first-round qualifying, and he missed the race after the second round was canceled. Benson finished 2nd three weeks later.

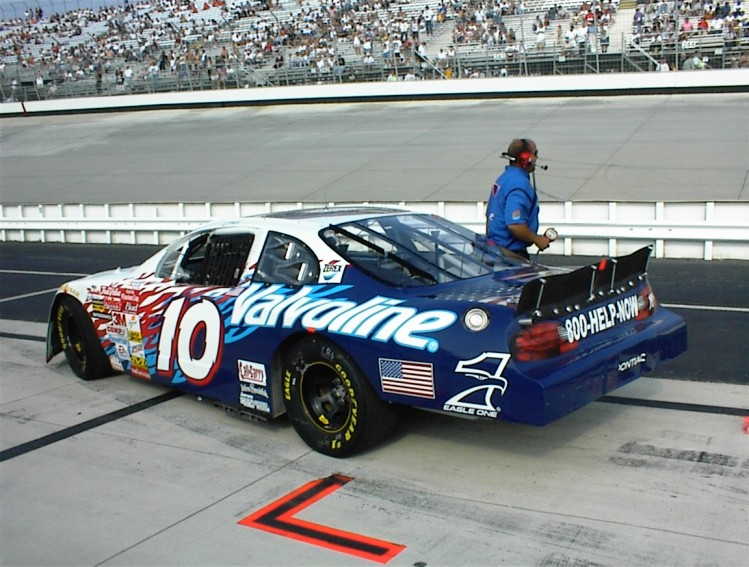
Benson's car in the pits at Dover in 2001.

At the Pepsi 400 in July, the Tyler Jet Motorsports car showed up at Daytona again with a white car. During the weekend before the race, the team removed the Lycos.com decals. Reports said that it was because Lycos never paid. Tyler Jet went sponsorless for the next four races before Aaron's came aboard right before the team shut down. During the sponsorless run the team was sold to MB2 Motorsports. In August, Valvoline announced they would not only sponsor the team but become part owner. Benson finished 13th in points.

Benson began his 2001 season with an engine failure that relegated him to 28th place, a few laps after the race's "Big One" involving nineteen cars took place. He had Top 10 finishes in each of the next four races, including a 4th-place run in the UAW-Daimler Chrysler 400, which allowed him to be a career-high 2nd in the points (tied with Sterling Marlin) following the spring Darlington Race. He finished 3rd at Texas and Indianapolis. He did not win a points race, even though he did win the non-points Winston Open at Charlotte from the pole after leader Ryan Newman in the No. 02 Alltel Ford suffered a blown engine late in the race. Benson finished the 2001 season 11th in points.

Benson started 2002 with a 10th-place finish in the Daytona 500 despite a crash early in the race. In May, Benson agreed to race in the Richmond Busch Series race for Marsh Racing in the No. 31 Whelen Engineering Chevrolet. Benson was involved in a wreck in the early stages of the races and ended up with broken ribs and he missed three Cup races. At the Pepsi 400 in Daytona, he started 6th, and on the eighth lap he got together with Michael Waltrip. Benson ended up rebreaking his ribs which put him out of action for two more races. At Loudon, Benson started 2nd, led 53 of 207 laps, and finished 4th. Benson tied a career-best 2nd-place finish at Martinsville Speedway, which he got twice in 2000. On November 3, he started 26th in the 43 car field at the Pop Secret Microwave Popcorn 400 at Rockingham. With fifty laps to go, he was running in 5th, and with 28 laps left he passed Mark Martin (who coincidentally had Valvoline as his sponsor for many years) for the lead. In the last ten laps, other drivers were running out of gas, including his teammate Ken Schrader. However, Benson held off Martin by 0.26 seconds to win the race.

Benson was 6th in points after the first four races of the 2003 season. Benson had Top 5 finishes at Dover and Homestead, and finished 24th in the points. Valvoline decided to release Benson in favor of rookie driver Scott Riggs after the season was over.

=== Busch and Trucks: 2004–2010 ===
2004 started off with Benson signing on with Phoenix Racing to run the full 2004 Busch Series schedule. Benson won his first and only career Busch pole at Rockingham, but a rules violation relegated him to last place when the green flag dropped for the race. He was poised to win at Bristol in the spring until Benson was caught up in a late race incident between Kevin Harvick and David Stremme. Benson was also involved in a crash between the top-four drivers at Nashville while racing for the win, and parted ways with Phoenix before the Richmond race. He also drove four races in Phoenix's No. 09 Cup ride, his best finish 27th at the Daytona 500.

Over the next few months, Benson ran one Busch race for Matt Kenseth and Robbie and John Reiser. In August, he was offered a ride in the Bill Davis Racing No. 23 truck in the Craftsman Truck Series, which was previously driven by Shelby Howard before he was released from the team. Benson had eight top-ten finishes in thirteen races, finishing 25th in the 2004 series' points standings. Benson had ten top-ten finishes in 25 races, and was tenth in the 2005 points standings. He ran four Busch races, one for FitzBradshaw Racing, and another for Smith Bros. Racing, finishing 18th at Nashville. He also had three Cup starts, two of them in the No. 00 Sara Lee Chevy for Michael Waltrip, and another at Atlanta in the No. 23 Dodge Charger for Bill Davis, finishing 28th.

Benson won his first Craftsman Truck Series race at the 2006 Con-way Freight 200 at the Michigan International Speedway. With the win, Benson became the seventeenth driver to win a race in all three of NASCAR's major series. He has also won a pole in each of the three series. He followed with a back-to-back win at the Toyota Tundra Milwaukee 200 at Milwaukee Mile. His third win of the season was at the Toyota Tundra 200 at Nashville Speedway. His fourth win of the season was at the Sylvania 200 at New Hampshire International Speedway. Benson won his fifth race of the year at the Casino Arizona 150 at Phoenix International Raceway. Benson finished the 2006 season in second-place, 127 behind Todd Bodine. He was named the series' Most Popular Driver for 2006.

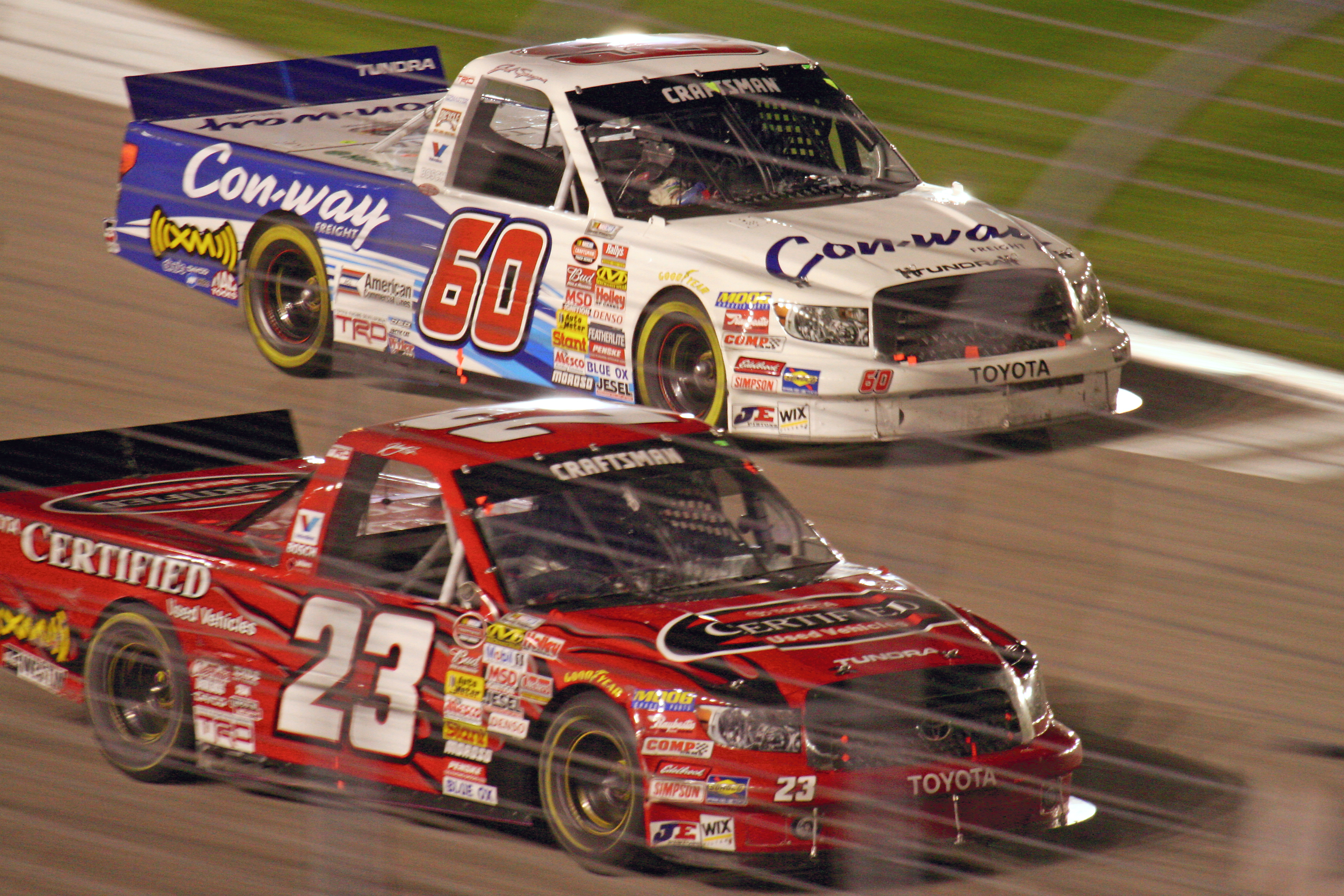
Benson in the Bill Davis Racing No. 23 truck during 2007.

For the 2007 season, Benson continued to drive in the No. 23 truck for Bill Davis Racing. He finished the season in third place with four wins: the Toyota Tundra Milwaukee 200 at Milwaukee Mile, the O'Reilly 200 presented by Valvoline Maxlife at Bristol, the Missouri/Illinois Dodge Dealers Ram Tough 200 at Gateway International Raceway, and the Ford 200 at Homestead-Miami Speedway. Benson was named the series' Most Popular Driver for the second year in row, becoming the first driver to repeat as award recipient. Benson also returned to NEXTEL Cup racing by driving the Wyler Racing No. 46 Toyota Camry in the 2007 Crown Royal Presents The Jim Stewart 400. He also returned to the Busch Series by driving the Phoenix Racing No. 1 Chevrolet Monte Carlo SS in the 2007 AT&T 250. Bill Davis also had Benson pull "double duty", driving the No. 23 truck and the No. 36 Toyota Camry in the Cup Series on the same weekend; he did so at the final two races of the year (Phoenix and Homestead-Miami).

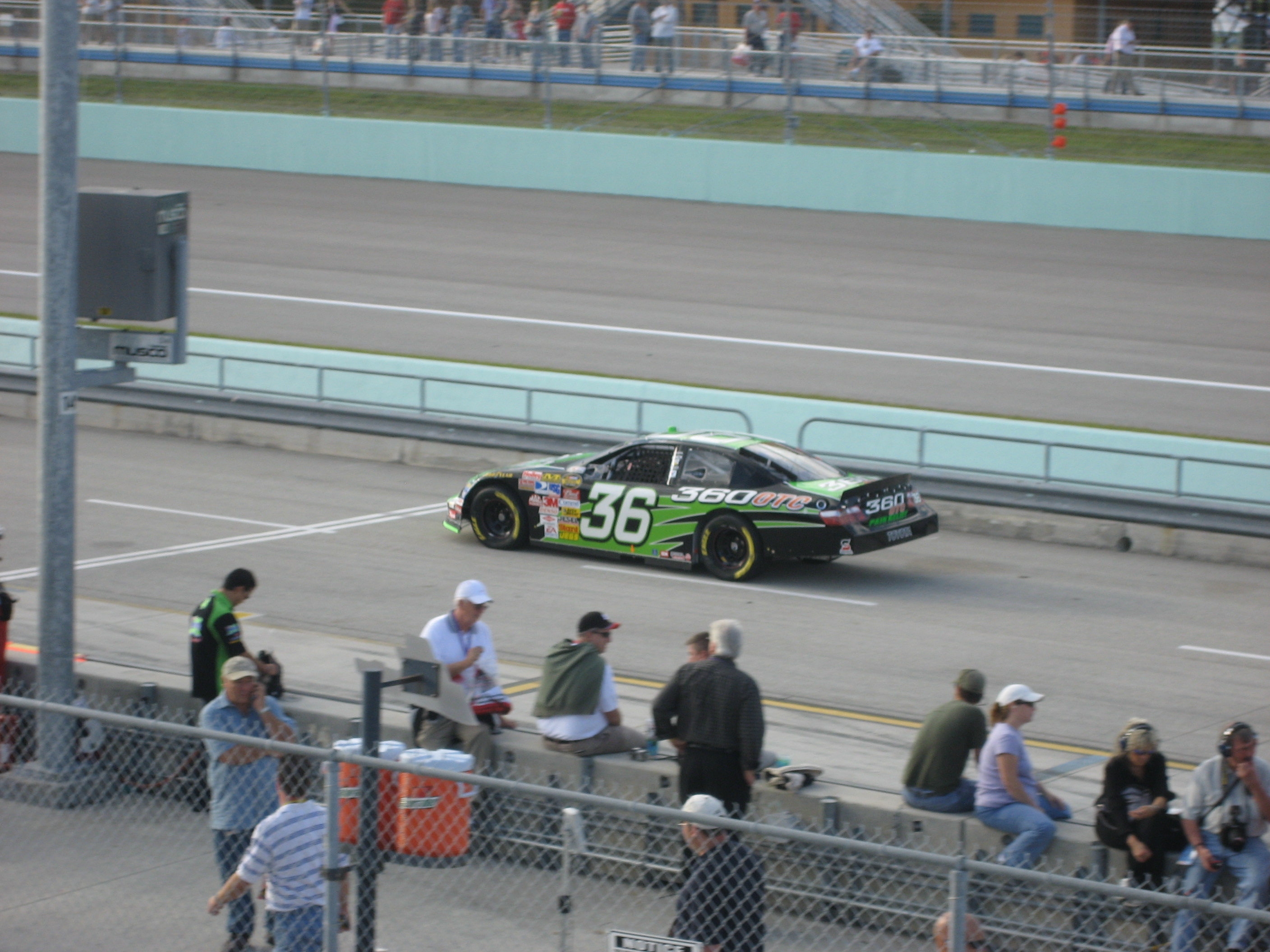
Benson in the Bill Davis Racing No. 36 car at Homestead in 2007, his final career Cup Series start.

Benson drove the No. 23 truck in the 2008 Craftsman Truck Series, winning the series championship in the last race of the season. With the title, he became the second driver to win both the Busch Grand National Series and Craftsman Truck Series championships (Greg Biffle accomplished this in 2002). In addition, to date he joined a list of only six drivers to ever win at least one championship in more than one of the three main title series (Bobby Labonte, Brad Keselowski, Kevin Harvick, and Kyle Busch are the others, and they have won championships in the second tier and Cup Series.) His first win of the season came at the Camping World RV Sales 200 at the Milwaukee Mile, the third consecutive race that Benson has won as Milwaukee Mile. His second, third, and fourth wins came at the Built Ford Tough 225 at Kentucky Speedway, the Power Stroke Diesel 200 at O'Reilly Raceway Park, and the Toyota Tundra 200 at Nashville Superspeedway. With this series of wins, he became the fifth driver in the Craftsman Truck Series to win three races in a row. His fifth win of the year came at the Kroger 200 at Martinsville Speedway. Benson was named the series' Most Popular Driver for the third year in row.

Also in 2008, after a deal for Jacques Villeneuve to drive the Bill Davis Racing No. 27 Toyota Camry fell through, it was announced that Benson and Mike Skinner would share driving duties for the No. 27. Benson failed to qualify in his first appearance in 2008 at the Kobalt Tools 500, which is also Benson's last attempt to run a Sprint Cup series race to date.

On November 6, 2008, Benson announced that he would not be returning to Bill Davis Racing after the 2008 season. On December 8, 2008, Benson announced that he would be joining the Red Horse Racing team to drive the No. 1 Toyota Tundra in the 2009 season. Benson's crew chief from the 2008 season, Trip Bruce, also joined the No. 1 team. On June 8, 2009, it was announced that Red Horse Racing was having to suspend the No. 1 due to a lack of sponsorship after competing in eight races with four top-ten finishes.

On June 13, 2009, Benson was burned in a fiery crash in an ISMA Supermodifieds race at Berlin Raceway. He was transported to Spectrum Health Butterworth Hospital with where he was hospitalized suffering from a broken collarbone, separated shoulder, three broken ribs, bruised lungs, a fractured wrist and third-degree burns on one elbow. After undergoing two surgeries for the burns and a separated shoulder, Benson fully recovered.

For the 2010 season, Kyle Busch Motorsports intended to field a truck for Benson, but did not to secure the necessary sponsorship. Benson served as a mentor to Kyle Busch Motorsports' drivers Brian Ickler and Tayler Malsam. Benson drove for Team Gill Racing in the season opener at Daytona finishing eighth. He then drove for Billy Ballew Motorsports at Martinsville, Kansas, and Dover finishing in the Top 10 in all three races including a pair of fifth-place finishes at Martinsville and Kansas. Benson's only race for Kyle Busch Motorsports came at Texas where he finished tenth. This was his final race in NASCAR.

Turn One Racing announced in 2011 that they intended to field a truck for Benson in 2012, but the deal fell through due to sponsorship issues.

== Post-racing career ==
Benson currently works for the National Motorsports Appeals Panel. Although Benson retired from NASCAR, he still raced a supermodified for car owner Brad Lichty on the ISMA tour until 2025. He also served as the pace car driver for the 2021 SRX Series. In 2023, Benson was announced as a competitor for the SRX Series in a one-off appearance at Berlin Raceway. Benson retired from driving competition on March 6, 2026.

- Johnny Benson Jr. was inducted in the Grand Rapids, MI Sports Hall of Fame (www.grshof.com) in 2013, following his Father, Johnny Sr. in 2001.
- Johnny Benson Jr. was inducted into the Michigan Motorsports Hall of Fame(www.mmshof.org) in 2018, following his Father, Johnny Sr. in 1986.
- Johnny Benson Jr. was inducted in the Berlin Raceway Hall of Fame (www.berlinraceway.com) in 2022, following his Father, Johnny Sr. in 2006.

== Motorsports career results ==
=== NASCAR ===
(key) (Bold – Pole position awarded by qualifying time. Italics – Pole position earned by points standings or practice time. * – Most laps led.)

==== Sprint Cup Series ====
NASCAR Cup Series results
| Year | Team | No. | Make | 1 | 2 | 3 | 4 | 5 | 6 | 7 | 8 | 9 | 10 | 11 | 12 | 13 | 14 | 15 | 16 | 17 | 18 | 19 | 20 | 21 | 22 | 23 | 24 | 25 | 26 | 27 | 28 | 29 | 30 | 31 | 32 | 33 | 34 | 35 | 36 | NSCC | Pts | Ref |
|---|---|---|---|---|---|---|---|---|---|---|---|---|---|---|---|---|---|---|---|---|---|---|---|---|---|---|---|---|---|---|---|---|---|---|---|---|---|---|---|---|---|---|
| 1996 | Bahari Racing | 30 | Pontiac | DAY; 23 | CAR; 20 | RCH; 37 | **ATL**; 38 | DAR; 24 | BRI; DNQ | NWS; 24 | MAR; 25 | TAL; 10 | SON; 18 | CLT; 38 | DOV; 17 | POC; 25 | MCH; 37 | DAY; 25 | NHA; 9 | POC; 5 | TAL; 18 | IND; 8* | GLN; 15 | MCH; 7 | BRI; 28 | DAR; 11 | RCH; 10 | DOV; 24 | MAR; 17 | NWS; 17 | CLT; 14 | CAR; 40 | PHO; 32 | ATL; 27 | | | | | | 21st | 3004 | |
| 1997 | Bahari Racing | 30 | Pontiac | DAY; 28 | CAR; 27 | RCH; 9 | ATL; 11 | DAR; 10 | TEX; 28 | BRI; 31 | MAR; 17 | SON; 21 | TAL; 9 | CLT; 15 | DOV; 21 | POC; 27 | MCH; 10 | CAL; 13 | DAY; 16 | NHA; 18 | POC; 13 | IND; 7 | GLN; 11 | **MCH**; 24 | BRI; 18 | DAR; 19 | RCH; 13 | NHA; 19 | DOV; 28 | MAR; 19 | CLT; 10 | TAL; 19 | CAR; 36 | PHO; 7 | ATL; 10 | | | | | 11th | 3575 | |
| 1998 | Roush Racing | 26 | Ford | DAY; DNQ | CAR; 30 | LVS; 4 | ATL; 9 | DAR; 8 | BRI; 5 | TEX; 5 | MAR; 38 | TAL; 41 | CAL; 8 | CLT; 9 | DOV; 41 | RCH; 18 | MCH; 22 | POC; 36 | SON; 21 | NHA; 21 | POC; 33 | IND; 25 | GLN; 9 | MCH; 34 | BRI; 33 | NHA; 21 | DAR; 21 | RCH; 41 | DOV; 15 | MAR; 9 | CLT; 28 | TAL; 31 | DAY; 26 | PHO; 9 | CAR; 41 | ATL; 23 | | | | 20th | 3160 | |
| 1999 | Roush Racing | 26 | Ford | DAY; 17 | CAR; 16 | LVS; 38 | ATL; 22 | DAR; 18 | TEX; 11 | BRI; 29 | MAR; 35 | TAL; 30 | CAL; 43 | RCH; 28 | CLT; 18 | DOV; 7 | MCH; 19 | POC; 30 | SON; 26 | DAY; 24 | NHA; 17 | POC; 14 | IND; 19 | GLN; 38 | MCH; 21 | BRI; 33 | DAR; 32 | RCH; 22 | NHA; 7 | DOV; 18 | MAR; 28 | CLT; 16 | TAL; 42 | CAR; 28 | PHO; 31 | HOM; 35 | ATL; 39 | | | 28th | 3012 | |
| 2000 | Tyler Jet Motorsports | 10 | Pontiac | DAY; 12 | CAR; 14 | LVS; 6 | ATL; DNQ | DAR; 24 | BRI; 2 | TEX; 42 | MAR; 16 | TAL; 13 | CAL; 23 | RCH; 25 | CLT; 16 | DOV; 15 | MCH; 24 | POC; 34 | SON; 18 | DAY; 13 | NHA; 14 | | | | | | | | | | | | | | | | | | | 13th | 3716 | |
| 2000 | MB2 Motorsports | 10 | Pontiac | | | | | | | | | | | | | | | | | | | POC; 12 | IND; 25 | GLN; 27 | MCH; 5 | BRI; 13 | DAR; 38 | RCH; 7 | NHA; 11 | DOV; 2 | MAR; 19 | CLT; 8 | TAL; 33 | CAR; 11 | PHO; 16 | HOM; 30 | ATL; 10 | | | 13th | 3716 | |
| 2001 | MB2 Motorsports | 10 | Pontiac | DAY; 28 | CAR; 6 | LVS; 4 | ATL; 7 | DAR; 7 | BRI; 26 | TEX; 3 | MAR; 20 | TAL; 7 | CAL; 11 | RCH; 6 | CLT; 20 | DOV; 41 | MCH; 12 | POC; 24 | SON; 29 | DAY; 13 | CHI; 27 | NHA; 36 | POC; 5 | IND; 3 | GLN; 16 | MCH; 5 | BRI; 36 | DAR; 14 | RCH; 10 | DOV; 31 | KAN; 37 | CLT; 36 | MAR; 6 | TAL; 23 | PHO; 10 | CAR; 3 | HOM; 20 | ATL; 23 | NHA; 12 | 11th | 4152 | |
| 2002 | MB2 Motorsports | 10 | Pontiac | DAY; 10 | CAR; 23 | LVS; 32 | ATL; 27 | DAR; 33 | BRI; 39 | TEX; 13 | MAR; 19 | TAL; 39 | CAL; 15 | RCH; INQ^{†} | CLT | DOV | POC; 20 | MCH; 6 | SON; 16 | DAY; 43 | CHI | NHA | POC; 30 | IND; 37 | GLN; 25 | MCH; 8 | BRI; 12 | DAR; 34 | RCH; 35 | NHA; 4 | DOV; 10 | KAN; 23 | TAL; 40 | CLT; 18 | MAR; 2 | ATL; 23 | CAR; 1 | PHO; 16 | HOM; 13 | 29th | 3132 | |
| 2003 | MB2 Motorsports | 10 | Pontiac | DAY; 19 | CAR; 13 | LVS; 12 | ATL; 11 | DAR; 25 | BRI; 19 | TEX; 32 | TAL; 41 | MAR; 32 | CAL; 36 | RCH; 15 | CLT; 24 | DOV; 5 | POC; 24 | MCH; 26 | SON; 30 | DAY; 27 | CHI; 18 | NHA; 26 | POC; 20 | IND; 13 | GLN; 27 | MCH; 10 | BRI; 14 | DAR; 40 | RCH; 9 | NHA; 25 | DOV; 21 | TAL; 41 | KAN; 35 | CLT; 16 | MAR; 34 | ATL; 24 | PHO; 21 | CAR; 29 | HOM; 4 | 24th | 3448 | |
| 2004 | Phoenix Racing | 09 | Dodge | DAY; 27 | CAR | LVS; 31 | ATL | DAR | BRI | TEX; 40 | MAR | TAL; 29 | CAL | RCH | CLT | DOV | POC | MCH | SON | DAY | CHI | NHA | POC | IND | GLN | MCH | BRI | CAL | RCH | NHA | DOV | TAL | KAN | CLT | MAR | ATL | PHO | DAR | HOM | 57th | 271 | |
| 2005 | Michael Waltrip Racing | 00 | Dodge | DAY | CAL | LVS | ATL | BRI | MAR | TEX | PHO | TAL | DAR | RCH | CLT | DOV | POC | MCH | SON | DAY | CHI | NHA | POC | IND | GLN | MCH; 42 | | | | | | | | | | | | | | 64th | 150 | |
| 2005 | Michael Waltrip Racing | 00 | Chevy | | | | | | | | | | | | | | | | | | | | | | | | BRI; 43 | CAL | RCH | NHA | DOV | TAL | KAN | CLT | MAR | | | | | 64th | 150 | |
| 2005 | Bill Davis Racing | 23 | Dodge | | | | | | | | | | | | | | | | | | | | | | | | | | | | | | | | | ATL; 28 | TEX | PHO | HOM | 64th | 150 | |
| 2007 | Wyler Racing | 46 | Toyota | DAY | CAL | LVS | ATL | BRI | MAR | TEX | PHO | TAL | RCH; 31 | DAR | CLT | DOV | POC | MCH | SON | NHA | DAY | CHI | IND | POC | GLN | MCH | BRI | CAL | RCH | NHA | DOV | KAN | TAL | CLT | MAR | ATL | TEX | | | 59th | 159 | |
| 2007 | Bill Davis Racing | 36 | Toyota | | | | | | | | | | | | | | | | | | | | | | | | | | | | | | | | | | | PHO; 36 | HOM; 43 | 59th | 159 | |
| 2008 | Bill Davis Racing | 27 | Toyota | DAY | CAL | LVS | ATL; DNQ | BRI | MAR | TEX | PHO | TAL | RCH | DAR | CLT | DOV | POC | MCH | SON | NHA | DAY | CHI | IND | POC | GLN | MCH | BRI | CAL | RCH | NHA | DOV | KAN | TAL | CLT | MAR | ATL | TEX | PHO | HOM | NA | - | |
^{†} - Qualified but replaced by Joe Nemechek

===== Daytona 500 =====
| Year | Team | Manufacturer | Start | Finish |
|---|---|---|---|---|
| 1996 | Bahari Racing | Pontiac | 27 | 23 |
| 1997 | Bahari Racing | Pontiac | 16 | 28 |
| 1998 | Roush Racing | Ford | DNQ | |
| 1999 | Roush Racing | Ford | 39 | 17 |
| 2000 | Tyler Jet Motorsports | Pontiac | 27 | 12 |
| 2001 | MB2 Motorsports | Pontiac | 33 | 28 |
| 2002 | MB2 Motorsports | Pontiac | 38 | 10 |
| 2003 | MB2 Motorsports | Pontiac | 40 | 19 |
| 2004 | Phoenix Racing | Dodge | 24 | 27 |

==== Busch Series ====
NASCAR Xfinity Series results
| Year | Team | No. | Make | 1 | 2 | 3 | 4 | 5 | 6 | 7 | 8 | 9 | 10 | 11 | 12 | 13 | 14 | 15 | 16 | 17 | 18 | 19 | 20 | 21 | 22 | 23 | 24 | 25 | 26 | 27 | 28 | 29 | 30 | 31 | 32 | 33 | 34 | 35 | NBGNC | Pts | Ref |
|---|---|---|---|---|---|---|---|---|---|---|---|---|---|---|---|---|---|---|---|---|---|---|---|---|---|---|---|---|---|---|---|---|---|---|---|---|---|---|---|---|---|
| 1993 | Ernie Irvan Racing | 41 | Chevy | DAY | CAR | RCH | DAR | BRI | HCY | ROU | MAR | NZH | CLT | DOV | MYB | GLN | MLW | TAL | IRP | MCH; 40 | NHA | BRI | DAR | RCH | DOV | ROU | | | | | | | | | | | | | 58th | 331 | |
| 1993 | BACE Motorsports | 74 | Chevy | | | | | | | | | | | | | | | | | | | | | | | | CLT; 30 | MAR | CAR; DNQ | HCY; 19 | ATL; 18 | | | | | | | | 58th | 331 | |
| 1994 | BACE Motorsports | 74 | Chevy | DAY; 26 | CAR; 25 | RCH; 15 | ATL; 16 | MAR; 20 | DAR; 16 | HCY; 4 | BRI; 30 | ROU; 4 | NHA; 12 | NZH; 31 | CLT; 22 | DOV; 22 | MYB; 16 | GLN; 33 | MLW; 3 | SBO; 3 | TAL; 38 | HCY; 11 | IRP; 11* | MCH; 38 | BRI; 8 | DAR; 4 | RCH; 6 | DOV; 1 | CLT; 11 | MAR; 13 | CAR; 8 | | | | | | | | 6th | 3303 | |
| 1995 | BACE Motorsports | 74 | Chevy | DAY; 10 | CAR; 4 | RCH; 3 | ATL; 1 | NSV; 6 | DAR; 2 | BRI; 6 | HCY; 1 | NHA; 5 | NZH; 3 | CLT; 30 | DOV; 14 | MYB; 9 | GLN; 7 | MLW; 33 | TAL; 5 | SBO; 16 | IRP; 13* | MCH; 5 | BRI; 12* | DAR; 2 | RCH; 3 | DOV; 9 | CLT; 26 | CAR; 3 | HOM; 9 | | | | | | | | | | 1st | 3688 | |
| 1996 | Bahari Racing | 30 | Pontiac | DAY | CAR | RCH | ATL | NSV | DAR | BRI | HCY | NZH | CLT | DOV | SBO | MYB | GLN | MLW | NHA | TAL | IRP | MCH | BRI | DAR | RCH | DOV | CLT | CAR | HOM; 42 | | | | | | | | | | 107th | 37 | |
| 1998 | BACE Motorsports | 26 | Chevy | DAY | CAR | LVS | NSV | DAR | BRI | TEX | HCY | TAL | NHA | NZH | CLT | DOV | RCH | PPR | GLN | MLW | MYB | CAL | SBO | IRP | MCH | BRI | DAR | RCH | DOV | CLT; 17 | GTY | CAR | ATL | HOM; 7 | | | | | 86th | 146 | |
| 1999 | BACE Motorsports | 26 | Chevy | DAY; 37 | CAR; 14 | LVS; 11 | ATL; 43 | DAR | TEX; 15 | NSV | BRI | TAL | CAL; 38 | | | NZH | CLT; 35 | | | | | | | | | | | | | | | | | | | | | | 46th | 1173 | |
| 1999 | BACE Motorsports | 33 | Chevy | | | | | | | | | | | NHA; 21 | RCH; DNQ | | | DOV; 12 | SBO | GLN | MLW | MYB | PPR | GTY | IRP | MCH | BRI | DAR | RCH | DOV; 34 | CLT | CAR; 6 | MEM | PHO; 14 | HOM; 27 | | | | 46th | 1173 | |
| 2000 | Herzog Motorsports | 91 | Chevy | DAY | CAR; DNQ | LVS | ATL | DAR | BRI | TEX | NSV | TAL | CAL | RCH | NHA | CLT | DOV | SBO | MYB | GLN | MLW | NZH | PPR | GTY | IRP | MCH | BRI | DAR | RCH | DOV | CLT | CAR | MEM | PHO | HOM | | | | NA | - | |
| 2002 | Marsh Racing | 31 | Chevy | DAY | CAR | LVS | DAR | BRI | TEX | NSH | TAL | CAL | RCH; 43 | NHA | NZH | CLT | DOV | NSH | KEN | MLW | DAY | CHI | GTY | PPR | IRP | MCH | BRI | DAR | RCH | DOV | KAN | CLT | MEM | ATL | CAR | PHO | HOM | | 123rd | 34 | |
| 2004 | Phoenix Racing | 1 | Dodge | DAY; 41 | **CAR**; 9 | LVS; 34 | DAR; 6 | BRI; 13 | TEX; 4 | NSH; 7 | TAL; 36 | CAL; 21 | GTY; 29 | RCH | NZH | CLT | DOV | | | | | | | | | | | | | | | | | | | | | | 39th | 1136 | |
| 2004 | Michael Waltrip Racing | 99 | Chevy | | | | | | | | | | | | | | | NSH; QL^{†} | | | | | | | | | | | | | | | | | | | | | 39th | 1136 | |
| 2004 | Reiser Enterprises | 17 | Ford | | | | | | | | | | | | | | | | KEN; 29 | MLW | DAY | CHI | NHA | PPR | IRP | MCH | BRI | CAL | RCH | DOV | KAN | CLT | MEM | ATL | PHO | DAR | HOM | | 39th | 1136 | |
| 2005 | FitzBradshaw Racing | 40 | Dodge | DAY | CAL | MXC | LVS | ATL | NSH | BRI | TEX | PHO | TAL | DAR | RCH | CLT | DOV | NSH; 18 | KEN | MLW | DAY | CHI | NHA | PPR | GTY | IRP | GLN | | | | | | | | | | | | 88th | 237 | |
| 2005 | Smith Brothers Motorsports | 67 | Dodge | | | | | | | | | | | | | | | | | | | | | | | | | MCH; 43 | BRI | CAL | RCH | DOV | KAN | CLT; DNQ | MEM | TEX; 41 | PHO | HOM; 38 | 88th | 237 | |
| 2007 | Phoenix Racing | 1 | Chevy | DAY | CAL | MXC | LVS | ATL | BRI | NSH | TEX | PHO | TAL | RCH | DAR | CLT | DOV | NSH | KEN | MLW; 9 | NHA | DAY | CHI | GTY | IRP | CGV | GLN | MCH | BRI | CAL | RCH | DOV | KAN | CLT | MEM | TEX | PHO | HOM | 116th | 138 | |
^{†} - Qualified for Michael Waltrip

==== Camping World Truck Series ====
NASCAR Craftsman Truck Series results
| Year | Team | No. | Make | 1 | 2 | 3 | 4 | 5 | 6 | 7 | 8 | 9 | 10 | 11 | 12 | 13 | 14 | 15 | 16 | 17 | 18 | 19 | 20 | 21 | 22 | 23 | 24 | 25 | 26 | NCWTC | Pts | Ref |
|---|---|---|---|---|---|---|---|---|---|---|---|---|---|---|---|---|---|---|---|---|---|---|---|---|---|---|---|---|---|---|---|---|
| 1995 | Roehrig Motorsports | 18 | Chevy | PHO; 10 | TUS | SGS | MMR | POR | EVG | I70 | LVL | BRI | MLW; 7 | CNS | HPT | IRP; 2 | FLM | RCH; 11 | MAR; 3 | NWS; DNQ | SON | MMR; 10 | PHO; 17 | | | | | | | 26th | 1049 | |
| 1996 | Roehrig Motorsports | 18 | Chevy | HOM | PHO | POR | EVG | TUS | CNS | HPT; 6 | BRI | NZH; 6 | MLW | LVL | I70 | IRP | FLM | GLN | NSV | RCH | NHA | MAR | **NWS**; 7 | SON | MMR | PHO; 2 | LVS | | | 39th | 616 | |
| 1997 | Roehrig Motorsports | 18 | Dodge | WDW | TUS | HOM | PHO | POR | EVG | I70 | NHA | TEX | BRI | NZH | MLW | LVL | CNS | HPT | IRP | FLM | NSV | GLN | RCH | MAR; 34 | SON | MMR | CAL | PHO | LVS | 129th | 61 | |
| 2004 | Bill Davis Racing | 23 | Toyota | DAY | ATL | MAR | MFD | CLT | DOV | TEX | MEM | MLW | KAN | KEN | GTW | MCH; 4 | IRP; 26 | NSH; 6 | BRI; 13 | RCH; 25 | NHA; 3 | LVS; 4 | CAL; 7 | TEX; 2 | MAR; 11 | PHO; 5 | DAR; 6 | HOM; 11 | | 25th | 1818 | |
| 2005 | Bill Davis Racing | 23 | Toyota | DAY; 10 | CAL; 12 | ATL; 11 | MAR; 17 | GTY; 11 | MFD; 23 | CLT; 4 | DOV; 34 | TEX; 2 | MCH; 24 | MLW; 35 | KAN; 28 | KEN; 9 | MEM; 9 | IRP; 16 | NSH; 8 | BRI; 4 | RCH; 13 | NHA; 32 | LVS; 33 | MAR; 15 | ATL; 3 | TEX; 13 | PHO; 3* | HOM; 3 | | 10th | 3076 | |
| 2006 | Bill Davis Racing | 23 | Toyota | DAY; 15 | CAL; 6 | ATL; 3 | MAR; 30 | GTY; 5 | CLT; 12 | MFD; 4 | DOV; 6 | TEX; 5 | MCH; 1 | MLW; 1 | KAN; 9 | KEN; 4 | MEM; 32 | IRP; 12 | NSH; 1 | BRI; 4 | NHA; 1* | LVS; 4 | TAL; 9 | MAR; 5 | ATL; 29 | TEX; 31 | **PHO**; 1 | HOM; 26 | | 2nd | 3539 | |
| 2007 | Bill Davis Racing | 23 | Toyota | DAY; 2 | CAL; 6 | ATL; 28 | MAR; 10 | KAN; 4 | CLT; 27 | MFD; 5 | DOV; 4 | TEX; 29 | MCH; 9 | MLW; 1* | MEM; 7 | KEN; 14 | IRP; 2 | NSH; 30 | BRI; 1* | GTW; 1 | NHA; 8 | LVS; 2 | TAL; 3 | MAR; 9 | ATL; 3 | TEX; 27 | PHO; 7 | HOM; 1* | | 3rd | 3557 | |
| 2008 | Bill Davis Racing | 23 | Toyota | DAY; 3 | CAL; 3 | ATL; 30 | MAR; 25 | KAN; 4 | CLT; 11 | **MFD**; 8 | DOV; 10 | TEX; 3 | MCH; 2 | **MLW**; 1* | **MEM**; 33 | KEN; 1* | IRP; 1 | NSH; 1 | BRI; 4 | GTW; 3 | NHA; 2 | LVS; 27 | TAL; 11 | MAR; 1 | ATL; 7 | TEX; 3 | PHO; 26 | HOM; 7 | | 1st | 3725 | |
| 2009 | Red Horse Racing | 1 | Toyota | DAY; 26 | CAL; 12 | ATL; 9 | MAR; 4 | KAN; 2 | CLT; 23 | DOV; 20 | TEX; 4 | MCH | MLW | MEM | KEN | IRP | NSH | BRI | CHI | IOW | GTW | NHA | LVS | MAR | TAL | TEX | PHO | HOM | | 32nd | 1047 | |
| 2010 | Team Gill Racing | 95 | Ford | DAY; 8 | ATL | | | | | | | | | | | | | | | | | | | | | | | | | 38th | 735 | |
| 2010 | Billy Ballew Motorsports | 15 | Toyota | | | MAR; 5 | NSH | KAN; 5 | DOV; 10 | CLT | | | | | | | | | | | | | | | | | | | | 38th | 735 | |
| 2010 | Kyle Busch Motorsports | 18 | Toyota | | | | | | | | TEX; 10 | MCH | IOW | GTY | IRP | POC | NSH | DAR | BRI | CHI | KEN | NHA | LVS | MAR | TAL | TEX | PHO | HOM | | 38th | 735 | |

=== Superstar Racing Experience ===
(key) * – Most laps led. ^{1} – Heat 1 winner. ^{2} – Heat 2 winner.

Superstar Racing Experience results
| Year | No. | 1 | 2 | 3 | 4 | 5 | 6 | SRXC | Pts |
|---|---|---|---|---|---|---|---|---|---|
| 2023 | 10 | STA I | STA II | MMS | BER; 12 | ELD | IRP | 26th | 0^{1} |

Sporting positions
| Preceded by David Green | NASCAR Busch Series Champion; 1995 | Succeeded by Randy LaJoie |
| Preceded by Ron Hornaday | NASCAR Craftsman Truck Series Champion; 2008 | Succeeded by Ron Hornaday |
| Preceded by Mike Eddy | ASA National Tour Champion; 1993 | Succeeded by Butch Miller |
Awards
| Preceded by Ricky Craven | NASCAR Winston Cup Series Rookie of the Year; 1996 | Succeeded by Mike Skinner |
