= Berlin Raceway =

Motorsport track in the United States

"The Berlin Effect"
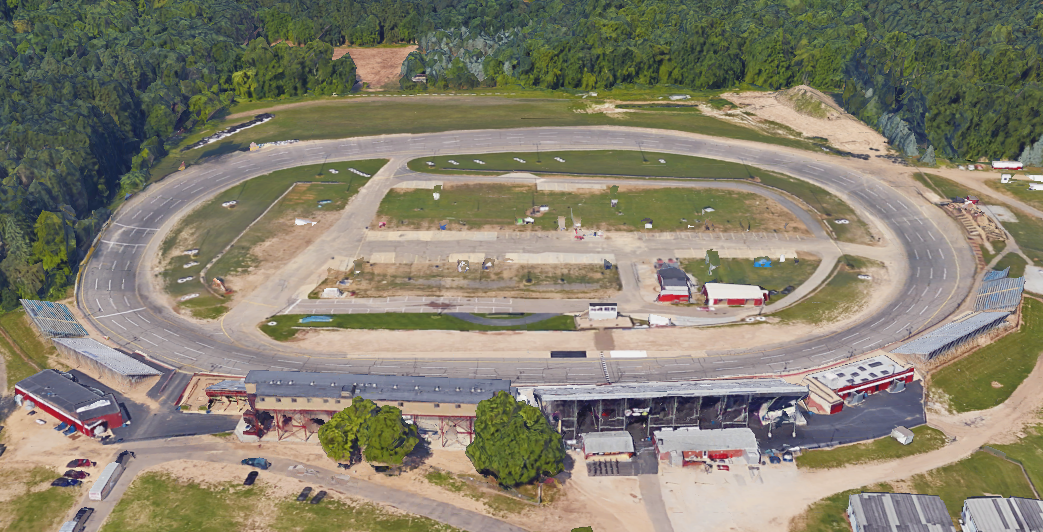
- Oval (1951–present)
- Location: 2060 Berlin Fair Drive; Marne, Michigan
- Coordinates: 43°2′8″N 85°50′7″W
- Capacity: 9,000
- Owner: Berlin Fair
- Operator: DBD Ventures
- Broke ground: 1950; 76 years ago
- Opened: 1951; 75 years ago
- Major events: Current: ARCA Menards Series; Herr's Snacks 200 (1986, 1999–2016, 2018, 2021–present); Former: NASCAR K&N Pro Series East; Stars & Stripes 150 (2017); Superstar Racing Experience (2023); ASA National Tour (1998–1999, 2001–2004); NASCAR Grand National East Series (1973)
- Website: www.berlinraceway.com

Oval
- Surface: Dirt (1951–1965); Asphalt (1966–present)
- Length: 0.437 mi (0.704 km)
- Turns: 4
- Banking: Turns: 13° Straights: 9°
- Race lap record: 0:12.513 ( (United States) Brian Gerster, Paved Sprint Car, 2018)

Berlin Raceway is a 0.438 mi (0.705 km) long paved oval race track in Marne, Michigan, near Grand Rapids. The track races weekly as part of the NASCAR Local Racing Series. It has also held touring series events on the ARCA Menards Series, ARCA Menards Series East, American Speed Association National Tour, USAC Stock Cars, USAC Silver Crown, World of Outlaws Sprint cars, and World of Outlaws Late Model Series tours.

== History ==
=== Chester Mysliwiec and family (1950–2000) ===
The track opened and was developed by the Chester Mysliwiec family in 1950. It was originally a horse track before World War II. Berlin Raceway takes its name from the town of Marne's original name "Berlin," which was changed due to Anti-German sentiment following World War I.

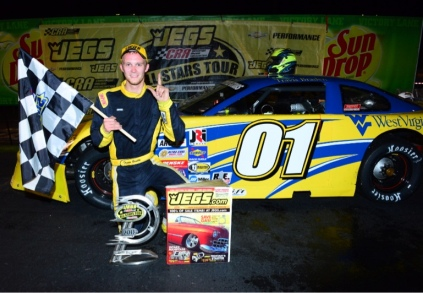
Travis Braden in victory lane at Berlin in 2014

=== Changes to ownership (2001–present) ===
It was purchased by the West Michigan Whitecaps in 2001. The group made numerous improvements to the facilities such as new bathrooms, updated catch fences, and a new sound system. Dirt was temporarily placed over the pavement after the 2017 regular season and three touring series visited the track in September / October - American Ethanol Late Model Tour, American Ethanol Modified Tour and Engine Pro Sprints On Dirt. Some racing scenes for the movie God Bless the Broken Road were recorded at the track in early 2016 for the 2018 film. The track dropped its Super Stock and Modified classes in 2020 and added a class of Limited Late Models. Other classes include Super Late Models, Sportsman, 4 Cylinder, and Mini-Wedges. Berlin Raceway won the 2021 Advance Auto Parts 'Advance My Track Challenge' $50,000 award beating out Hudson Speedway in New Hampshire and Alaska Raceway Park.

Some drivers that have come from the track are Jack Sprague, Tim Steele, 1967 track champion Bob Senneker, and 2017 Super Late Model track champion Carson Hocevar. 1989 track Outlaw Late Model champion Johnny Benson Jr. described the track as "one of the most difficult tracks in the country." The track has a 13-degree banking in turns and 9-degree banking on the straightaways. The track is notable for the lack of an outside wall on the back straightaway, a rare feature for a track featuring national series races. In addition, the short straights make it feel almost circular.

== Events ==
=== Racing ===
==== ARCA ====
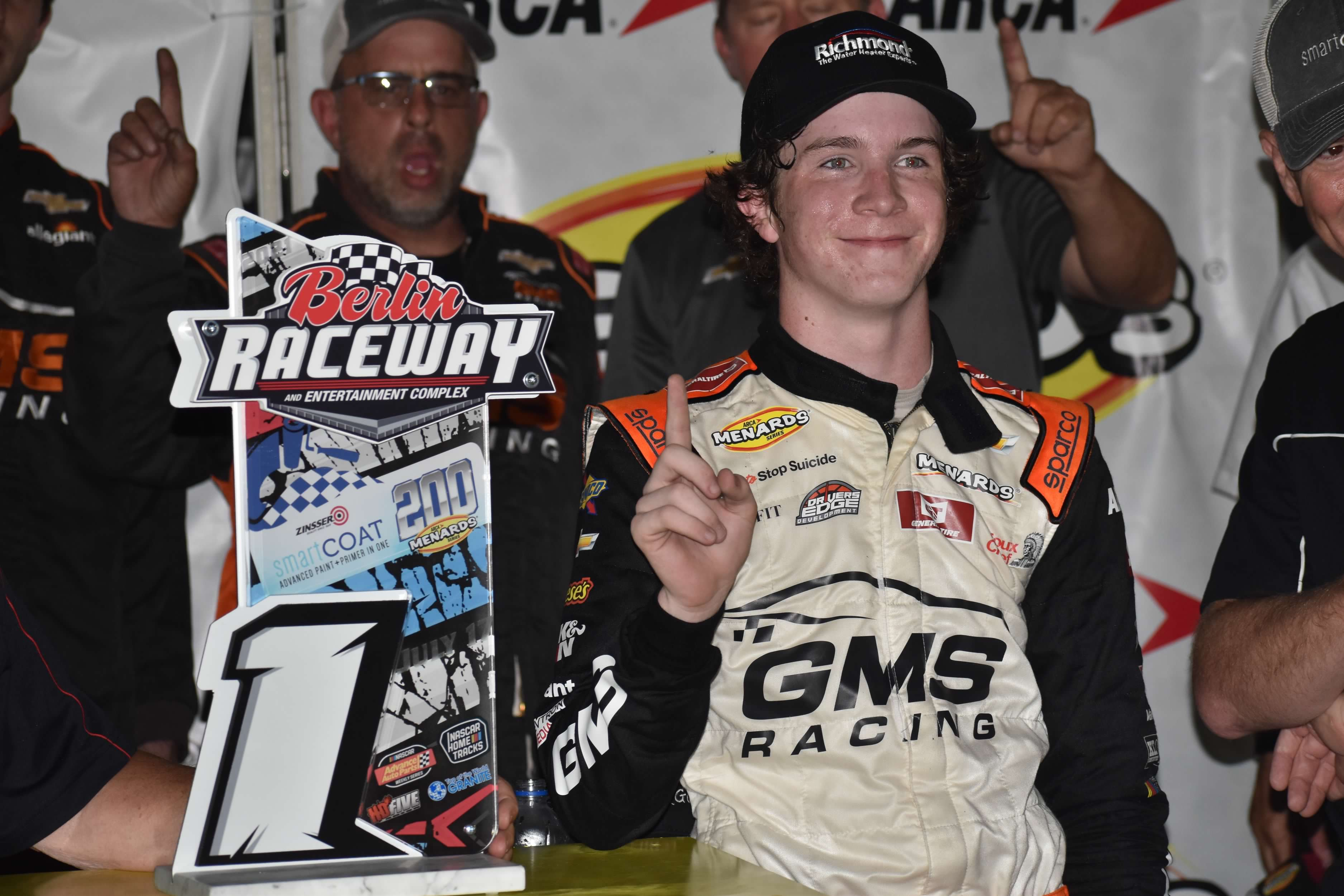
Daniel Dye, the ARCA races winner from 2021. Since 1986, Berlin has held ARCA races at the facility.

Berlin hosts one annual ARCA Menards Series weekend, highlighted by the Herr's Snacks 200. Max Reaves is the defending winner of the event, having won it in 2026.

In 2017, a race under the NASCAR K&N Pro Series East banner was held at Berlin, in which Todd Gilliland won the event.

==== Other racing events ====
In 1973, one of the final NASCAR Grand National East Series races was held. Bob Senneker won the race titled the Coca-Cola 100,m.

Bob Senneker also won seven American Speed Association (ASA) National tour races at the track. Other winners on the ASA National tour starting in 1998 included Gary St. Amant and Butch Miller.
