= Bob Senneker =

American stock car racing driver (born 1944)

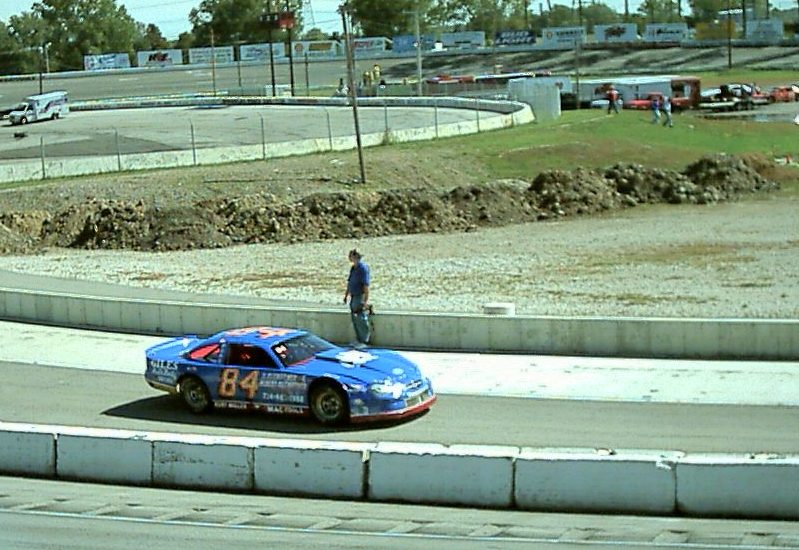
- Senneker in the Blue Bird special at Toledo Speedway
- Nationality: American
- Born: December 12, 1944 (age 81)
- Retired: 1998
- Relatives: Terry Senneker (brother)

American Speed Association
- Starts: 396
- Wins: 85
- Best finish: 1st in 1990

Championship titles
- 1990: ASA National champion

Awards
- 1988: Michigan Motor Sports Hall of Fame

NASCAR Cup Series career
- 8 races run over 4 years
- Best finish: 44th (1983)
- First race: 1968 Daytona 500 (Daytona)
- Last race: 1983 Atlanta Journal 500 (Atlanta)
| Wins | Top tens | Poles |
|---|---|---|
| 0 | 0 | 0 |
- Statistics up to date as of July 3, 2020.

Bob Senneker (born December 12, 1944) is an American stock car racing driver from Dorr, Michigan near Grand Rapids. He is best known for racing on the American Speed Association (ASA) National Tour where he was the 1990 champion. Senneker's 85 wins were the most in series history. He has also raced in eight NASCAR Cup Series races between 1968 and 1983.

== Background /Personal life ==
Senneker was born on December 12, 1944. His brother, Terry Senneker, raced against him and has done some touring series starts.

== Racing career ==
=== Local driver (1963–1972) ===
In 1963, Senneker began racing at the 1/4 mile paved Grand Rapids Speedrome in 1963. He began racing at Berlin Raceway after it was paved in 1966; he won 92 features and over 130 preliminary races between 1966 and 1980. In 1966, he won 18 features at Berlin. He was the 1966, 1967, and 1968 Berlin track champion. In the 1960s, he also won track championships at Grand Rapids Speedrome, Tri-City Motor Speedway, and Kalamazoo Speedway.

Senneker began this 1970 season by winning at Heidelberg Raceway; he also won the Glass City 200 at Toledo Speedway by two laps. In 1971, he raced Heidelberg Raceway as well at selected larger money shows. Senneker won the Goodyear 250 that season at Cayuga Speedway in Ontario, Canada. In 1972, Senneker was the U.S. Stock Car Champion at Tri-City.

=== ASA / ARTGO (1974–1998) ===
Senneker took his first ASA National Tour win at the Winchester 400 in 1974; he ended up winning the race five consecutive times (1974–1978). That season, he used a Camaro to win approximately 40 races. He began teaming up with Ed Howe in 1975 and he started using a new car. Senneker won 21 times in 1976 and 28 feature races in 1977. In his "Bluebird" car, he won 24 times in 1978, including six ASA wins - the first Milwaukee 150, his fifth consecutive Winchester 400, and a 300-lap race at I-70 Speedway. In 1979, he promoted at Hartford Motor Speedway. He cut back on weekly races and just concentrated on major races. The final year of the decade ended with five wins, including one in ASA and one in ARTGO.

Senneker started the eighties by winning 15 times including the Anderson 300, Cayuga 300, Minnesota State Fair 300, and the Queen City 300. He won five in ASA to take second in the national tour points. Senneker recorded 11 wins in 1981, including five times in ASA (Milwaukee 500 and the first ASA race at Michigan International Speedway) as well as an All-Pro race at Birmingham International Raceway. In the 1982 ASA season, Senneker primarily raced in ASA. He had eight wins, including the Badger 150 at the Milwaukee Mile, Indianapolis Raceway Park, the Molson 200 and Molson 300 at Cayuga International Speedway, the Fall Classic 300 at Indianapolis Raceway Park, and the All-American 400 at Nashville Speedway. Senneker remained racing primarily in ASA in 1983 and won six features. Senneker won ten ASA races in 1984 and finished second after an accident in the final race of the season. He raced strictly at ASA races and won once in 1985 and once in 1986 (Cayuga).

In 1991, Senneker won four consecutive ASA races in the middle of the year.

Senneker's final ASA start happened on September 26, 1998 where he won in his final race at Southern National Speedway. He had competed in 396 ASA races with 85 wins.

Senneker won nine times in frequent ARTGO starts throughout his career.

=== NASCAR ===
Senneker made eight NASCAR Cup Series starts in this career. He made his first start at the 1968 Daytona 500 in a home-built 1966 Chevelle. He had his career-best 13th place finish. His next NASCAR race happened at his home track of Michigan International Speedway in 1970. He started 30th and finished 21st. Eleven years later, Senneker started 23rd for J.D. Stacy at Charlotte Motor Speedway and finishing 21st after crashing.

Senneker made his final five NASCAR starts in 1983 for Terry Marra in the No. 80 Pontiac. He finished 28th after crashing at Atlanta, 27th with battery issues at 1983 World 600 (Charlotte), 14th and 16th at Michigan, and 15th at Atlanta.

== Driving style ==
Speed Sport describes Senneker's personality as "intensely focused, ... engrossed with the thought of winning the next race." Speed Sport also said "His smooth, calculating style was perfectly suited to long races and he had an uncanny ability to conserve his equipment." Michigan fans nicknamed him "The Sneaker" for his patience and "The Bluebird" for his blue car which was often "flew" in front.

== Awards ==
Senneker was inducted into the Michigan Motor Sports Hall of Fame in 1988. He was inducted into the Grand Rapids, MI Sports Hall of Fame(www.grshof.com) in 2006. He was added to the Berlin Raceway Hall of Fame in 2015.
