= Nashville Fairgrounds Speedway =

Motorsport track in the United States

- Layout of the Nashville Fairgrounds Speedway (1972–present)
- Location: Nashville, Tennessee
- Coordinates: 36°7′50″N 86°45′44″W
- Capacity: 15,000
- Owner: Tennessee State Fairgrounds
- Operator: Bob Sargent-Track Enterprises, Inc and Randy Dyce D & D Events, Inc.
- Broke ground: 1904
- Opened: 1904
- Former names: Music City Motorplex (2004–2009); Fairgrounds Speedway at Nashville (2002–2003); Nashville Speedway USA (1995–2001); Nashville Motor Raceway (1988–1994); Nashville Motor Speedway (1986–1987); Nashville Raceway (1984–1985); Nashville International Raceway (1979–1983); Nashville Speedway (1974–1978); Fairgrounds Speedways (1959–1973); Nashville Speedways (1904–1958)
- Major events: Current: ARCA Menards Series East; Music City 150 (1992, 2007–2008, 2015–2019, 2021–present); CARS Tour (2003–2004, 2018–2021, 2026); ASA STARS National Tour; All American 400 (1981–2010, 2012–present); North-South Challenge (2016–present); Former: Winston Cup Series; Pepsi 420 (1958–1984); Coors 420 (1959, 1964–1965, 1973–1984); NASCAR Busch Series; BellSouth Mobility 320 (1984, 1988–1989, 1995–2000); NASCAR Craftsman Truck Series; Federated Auto Parts 250 (1996–2000); Superstar Racing Experience (2021–2022); NASCAR Whelen Southern Modified Tour (2007)
- Website: nashvillefairgroundsspeedway.racing

Large Oval (1972–present)
- Surface: Asphalt
- Length: 0.596 mi (0.959 km)
- Banking: Turns: 18° Straights: 3°
- Race lap record: 0:18.288 ( (United States) William Sawalich, Super Late Model, 2023, American Speed Association)

Small Oval
- Surface: Asphalt
- Length: 0.250 mi (0.402 km)

Nashville Fairgrounds Speedway is a 0.596 mi (0.959 km) motorsport racetrack located at the Nashville Fairgrounds near downtown Nashville, Tennessee. The track is the second-oldest continually operating track in the United States. The track held NASCAR Grand National/Winston Cup (now NASCAR Cup Series) races from 1958 to 1984.

== Track configuration ==
The speedway is currently an 18 degree banked paved oval. The track is 0.596 mi (0.959 km) long. Inside the larger oval is a 0.250 mi (0.402 km) paved oval.

The track was converted to a 0.250 mi (0.402 km) paved oval in 1957, when it began to be a NASCAR series track. The speedway was lengthened between the 1969 and 1970 seasons. The corners were cut down from 35 degrees to their present 18 degrees in 1972. The track was repaved between the 1995 and 1996 seasons.

== Track history ==
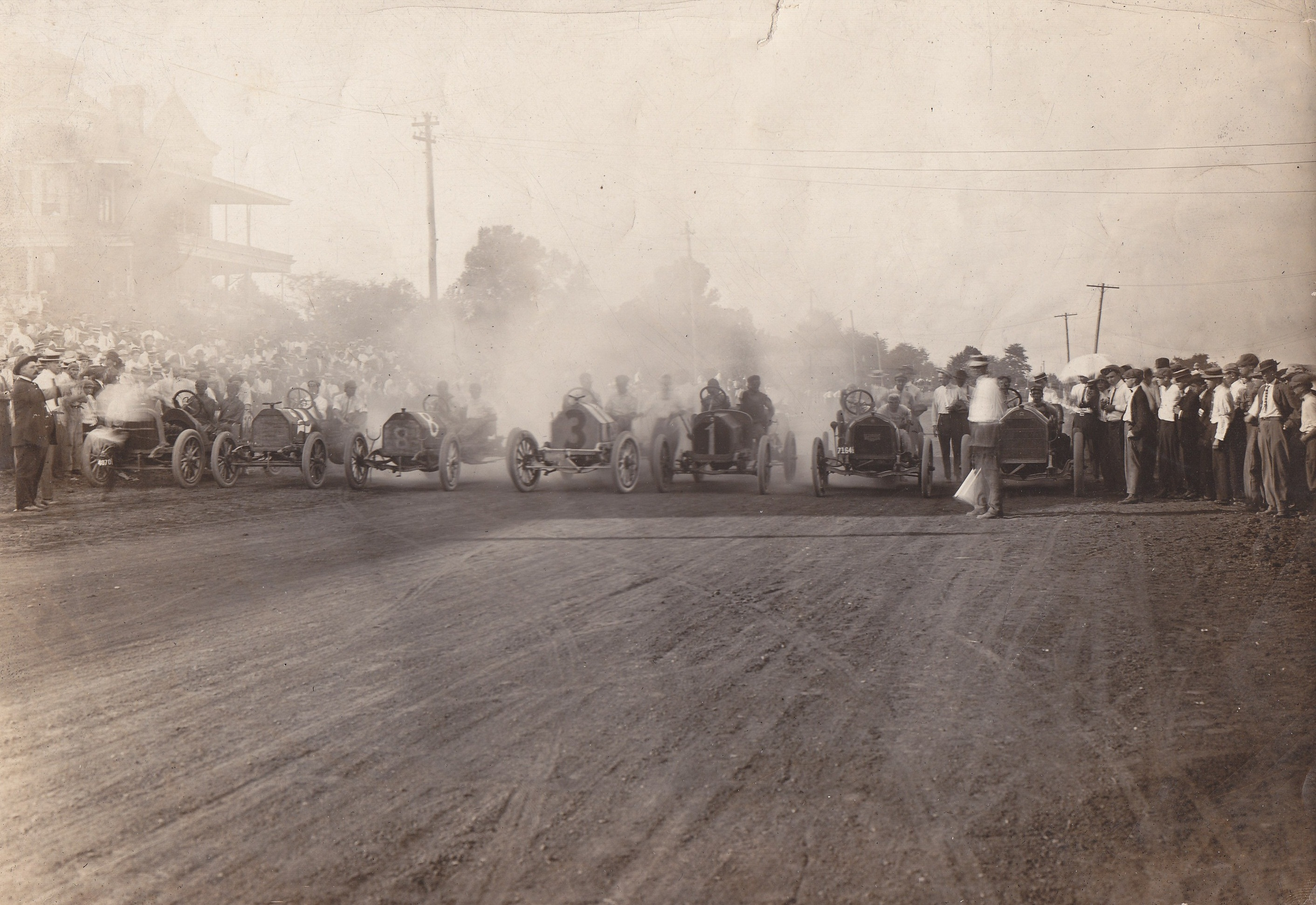
1911 race at the Fairgrounds

The track first featured "horseless carriages" and motorcycles on June 11, 1904, on a 1 1/8 mi (1.8 km) dirt oval. Races were canceled after a motorcycle ran into the back of a car that was lining up. Harness horse racing events were also held at the track.

In September 1904 another series of races was organized. Most of the entrants came directly to Nashville from the 1904 World's Fair in St. Louis, Missouri. Racing pioneer Barney Oldfield was one of the entrants. People marveled at cars driving over 60 miles per hour (97 km/h).

The track began holding annual events in September 1915 to coincide with the state fair. Many of the same drivers from the Indianapolis 500 brought their cars down to Nashville.

Local tracks sprang up and began running weekly Saturday night shows (collectively called the "Legion Bowl"), and the local racers competed at the track for the 1954 through 1957 State Fairs. In 1958 car racers decided to build a paved racetrack. The racers ended opposition from horse racers by building a horse track. The racers got a 10-year lease from the state fair board in order to build a paved 1/2 mile track which shared the frontstretch with a 1/4 mile track. On July 19, 1958, the first race was held at the new speedway. Races were held only on the 1/4 mile track (except for special events).

A 1959 NASCAR Grand National race of 200 laps in 1959 was unique; it was the first time an entire starting field (12 of 12 cars) finished the race, one of four instances it has happened in Cup Series history. That would not happen again until 36 years later, when the entire field at the 1995 Tyson Holly Farms 400 finished the race.

The original cars (since 1948) were 1930s model cars called "Modified Specials". By 1964 the parts for cars were too hard to find, so the track changed to newer 1950s model cars called "Late Model Modifieds". Some of the early stars of the track decided to retire.

=== 1960s ===
The 1960s also frequently brought drivers from outside Nashville, most notably the Alabama Gang. The Alabama Gang (from Hueytown, Alabama) included future NASCAR legends Bobby Allison, Donnie Allison, and Nashville native Red Farmer.

Coo Coo Marlin was the first back-to-back champion in 1965/1966. 1968 champion P.B. Crowell decided to retire, and hired the talented young Darrell Waltrip to drive his car. Country music legend Marty Robbins raced often at the track in his signature purple and yellow race cars.

Several changes happened at the track in the 1960s. Lights were added to the 1/2 mile track in 1965, and races in the main division moved to the big track. A fire burned the grandstands at the 1965 State Fair. Weekly Tuesday night races were added, and fans were awed by the crazy Figure-8 drivers barely missing each other as they crossed each other's paths. New grandstands were built and the track was lengthened (and banked to 35 degrees) in 1969.

=== 1970s ===
The bankings in the corners proved to be too fast, so the banking was reduced to 18 degrees. The new ownership decided to hold not weekly races in 1979.

The 1970s also featured talented drivers that would progress to NASCAR's highest division. Second generation drivers Sterling Marlin (son of Coo Coo) and Steve Spencer (NASCAR) Mike Alexander (NASCAR) (son of car owner R.C.) were all track champions. Alabama Gang member Jimmy Means took the track title home to Alabama in 1974 before he moved on to NASCAR's Winston Cup.

=== 1980s ===
The track returned to hosting weekly races in 1980. In 1984, the top NASCAR series fielded its final race at the facility after disputes with city government and track management. The new headline division featured smaller Camaro-type bodies called "Late Model Stock Cars". The new division caught on slowly, and only 13 drivers competed in the first race. The division finally caught on in 1987. NASCAR stars that raced in 1987 or 1988 included Bobby Allison, Sterling Marlin, Mike Alexander, Darrell Waltrip, Bill Elliott, and Dale Earnhardt. Third generation driver Bobby Hamilton won track championships in 1987 and 1988.

=== 1990s ===
The 1990 season was dominated by Jeff Green. Mike Reynolds won the 1991 track championship. Mike Alexander won the 1992 track championship. Chad Chaffin won the 1993 and 1995 track championships. Andy Kirby won the 1994, 1996, and 1997 track championships. Joe Buford won the 1998 and 1999 track championships.

The ARCA Racing Series held a 200-lap race in 1992. In 1995, the track returned to the NASCAR circuit, hosting a yearly Busch Series race and, later, a yearly Craftsman Truck Series race. Those races would move to the new Nashville Superspeedway in 2001.

=== 2000s ===
The track was renamed "Music City Motorplex" for 2003 by new promoter Joe Mattioli III, whose family owns Pocono Raceway and South Boston Speedway.

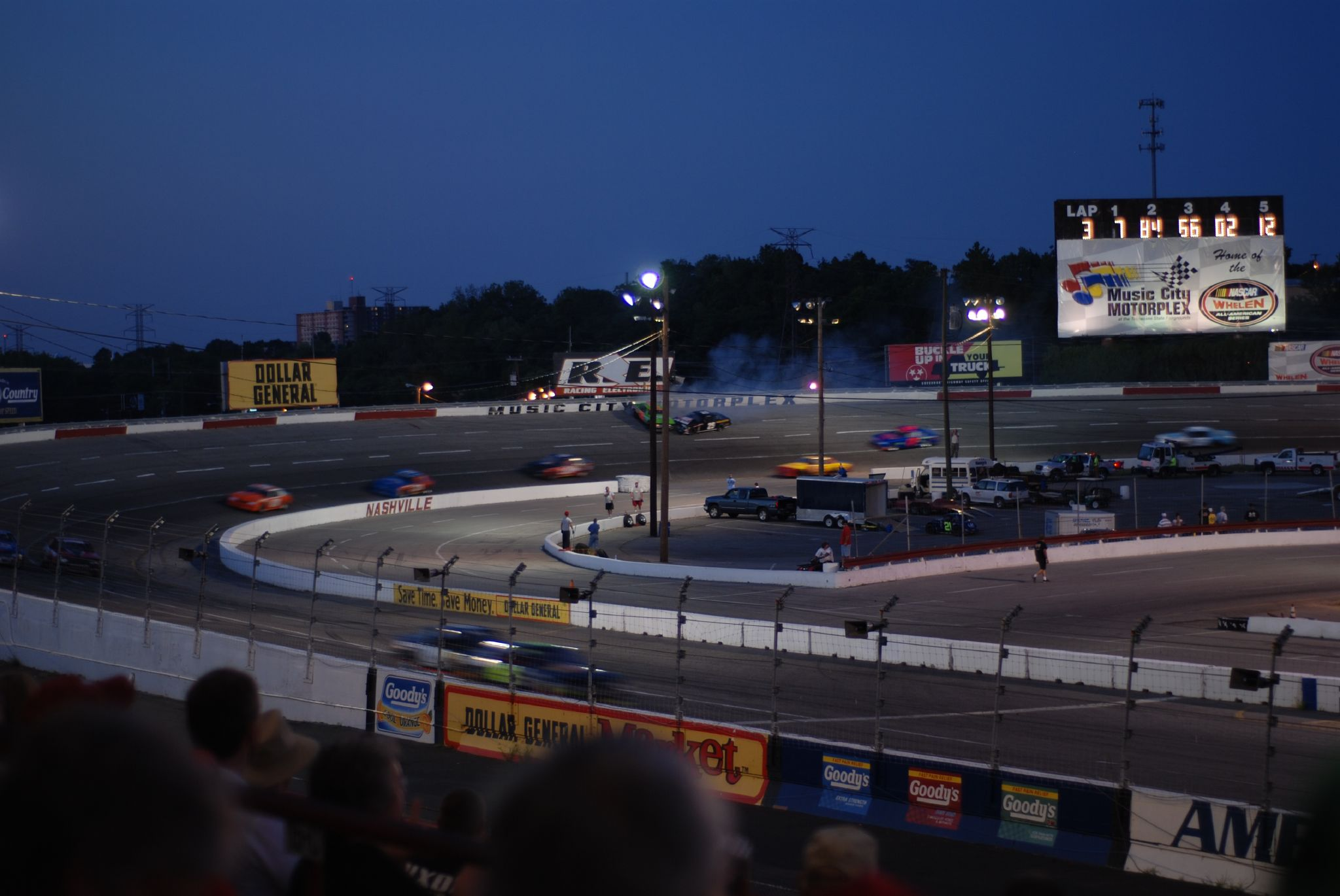
2007 race at the Tennessee Fairgrounds

The 2007 schedule featured races in NASCAR's two regional series, the Busch East Series and Whelen Southern Modified Tour.

In 2009, Music City Motorplex was to host an ARCA RE/MAX Series event on June 20, but it was announced on February 20, 2009, that the race would be moved to Mansfield Motorsports Park in Mansfield, Ohio.

In 2009, the track's prestigious All American 400 was canceled and not rescheduled because of severe rain and political issues with Nashville mayor Karl Dean, who wanted the track and the Tennessee State Fairgrounds closed in order to redevelop the site. A ballot measure protecting the track was passed and the track continued to operate.

The logo used by the speedway in the 2010s.

=== 2010s and 2020s ===
The All American 400 was resurrected for 2012. It was cancelled in 2018, but returned in 2019. The CRA Super Series and Southern Super Series also race at the track. The ARCA Menards Series has visited the venue since 2015 with a 200-lap race titled the Music City 200. The World of Outlaws Sprint Car Series had a doubleheader race in 2019, with the quarter-mile track covered in dirt.

In December 2018, then-track operator Tony Formosa Jr. reached an agreement with Speedway Motorsports and its main Tennessee track Bristol Motor Speedway to co-operate the facility and make the necessary upgrades for the track to host NASCAR Cup Series, NASCAR Xfinity Series and NASCAR Craftsman Truck Series races again and continue to host weekly racing events.

Speedway Motorsports is in talks with Nashville council about bringing NASCAR sanctioned events back to the facility, as well as renovating the track. In December 2021, Speedway Motorsports reached an agreement in principle with Mayor John Cooper on a plan to revitalize and bring the NASCAR Cup Series back to the speedway. In June 2026, The Tennessean reported that the track's grandstands caught fire.

== Races ==
=== NASCAR Cup Series ===
The track held at least one Cup race each year from 1958 to 1984.

A capacity crowd of 13,998 watched Joe Weatherly win the first NASCAR race on August 10, 1958.

Geoff Bodine beat Darrell Waltrip for his second career win in the last Cup Series event at the track, the second win for the upstart All Star Racing, now known as Hendrick Motorsports.

NASCAR left the track because of a dispute over who would manage the track took place prior to the start of the 1985 season.

Of the 42 Cup races, nine were won by Richard Petty and eight by Darrell Waltrip. Waltrip won five of the last seven races held at the track between 1981 and 1984. Waltrip's victory in the 1988 Busch Series event gave him nine total NASCAR wins at the track. Counting NASCAR, USAC, ASA, and local track races, Waltrip holds the all-time track record for wins with 67.

=== NASCAR Busch Series ===
The track held nine Busch Series races in 1984, 1988, 1989, and from 1995 to 2000. The track was replaced on the schedule by the newly opened Nashville Superspeedway for 2001.

=== NASCAR Craftsman Truck Series ===
The track held five NASCAR Craftsman Truck Series events between 1996 and 2000, known as the Federated Auto Parts 250. It was held in August from 1996 to 1998 and in 2000 and in July in 1999. The track was replaced on the schedule by the newly opened Nashville Superspeedway for 2001.

Winners

- 1996: Dave Rezendes
- 1997: Jack Sprague
- 1998: Jimmy Hensley
- 1999: Dennis Setzer
- 2000: Randy Tolsma

=== All American 400 ===
The All American 400 is a 400-lap, 240-mile super late model stock car race held at the Fairgrounds since 1981. However, some editions were shortened to 300 laps (180 miles), and others 200 laps, with the remainder being split for Pro Late Model classes since Super Late Models became the premier class.

Originally it was co-sanctioned between the All Pro Super Series (later the NASCAR Southeast Series) and the American Speed Association. In 1991, the NASCAR Southeast Series took over the race until the 2000 edition. The race returned in 2003 as part of the ARCA/CRA Super Series, and has been promoted by variants of Track Enterprises since.

Winners

- 1981: Butch Lindley
- 1982: Bob Senneker
- 1983: Jim Sauter
- 1984: Gary Balough
- 1985: Rusty Wallace
- 1986: Gary Balough
- 1987: Darrell Waltrip
- 1988: Butch Miller
- 1989: Butch Miller
- 1990: Gary St. Amant
- 1991: Jeff Purvis
- 1992: Jeff Purvis
- 1993: Mike Garvey
- 1994: Bobby Gill
- 1995: Jeff Purvis
- 1996: Wayne Anderson
- 1997: Freddie Query
- 1998: Freddie Query
- 1999: Wayne Anderson
- 2000: Mike Garvey
- 2001-2002: Not held
- 2003: Brian Hoppe (Patriot 200)
- 2004: Chuck Barnes Jr. (200 laps)
- 2005: Jason Hogan (200 laps)
- 2006: Boris Jurkovic (200 laps)
- 2007: John Van Doorn (200 laps)
- 2008: Chris Gabehart (200 laps)
- 2009: Not held (rain)
- 2010: TJ Reaid (200 laps)
- 2011: Not held (political issues with mayor)
- 2012: Ross Kenseth (PASS sanction - 220/400 laps - rain)
- 2013: Chase Elliott (300 laps)
- 2014: John Hunter Nemechek (PLM -300 laps)
- 2015: Daniel Hemric (PLM - 300 laps)
- 2016: Bubba Pollard (SLM - 400 laps)
- 2017: Donnie Wilson (SLM - 400 laps)
- 2018: Not held (rain)
- 2019: Mason Mingus (SLM - 400 laps)
- 2020: Casey Roderick (SLM - 300 laps)
- 2021: Matt Craig (SLM - 300 laps)
- 2022: Stephen Nasse (SLM - 300 laps)
- 2023: William Sawalich (SLM - 300 laps)
- 2024: Jake Garcia (SLM - 315 laps)

=== Other races ===
The ARCA Menards Series first visited the Fairgrounds in 1992, then had an annual race from 2015 to 2019. The ARCA Menards Series East took over the date in 2021.

The venue hosted a round of the American Speed Association from 1998 to 1999 and then in 2003.

The Hooters Pro Cup Series raced at the track in 2003 and 2004. Its successor the CARS Super Late Model Tour has an annual race since 2018.

Superstar Racing Experience announced that their final race of the 2021 season would be hosted by the track. Guest drivers for the event would be NASCAR driver Hailie Deegan and defending Cup Series champion Chase Elliott.

== List of notable weekly drivers ==
- Mike Alexander – 2 time track champion and current car owner
- Casey Atwood – 1996 Rookie of the Year, former weekly competitor
- Bunkie Blackburn – regular weekly competitor
- Joe Buford – 4 time track champion
- Chad Chaffin – 2 time track champion and current car owner
- Mark Day – 2006 track champion
- Jeff Green – 1-time champion
- Clay Greenfield – NASCAR Gander Outdoors Truck Series driver, competing in the Pro Late Model series and Super Truck series with two wins in 2019
- Bobby Hamilton – 2 time track champion (plus 2-time champion in a lower division)
- Andy Kirby – 3 time track champion
- Coo Coo Marlin – 4 time track champion
- Steadman Marlin – Grandson of Coo Coo Marlin, son of Sterling Marlin, former Busch series driver, former weekly competitor
- Sterling Marlin – 3 time track champion, former weekly competitor
- Steve Spencer – 1 time track Champion, Rookie of the Year, Tennessee State Champion, track record holder
- Jimmy Means – 1 time track champion, former weekly competitor
- Harold Ferguson – 1 time track champion, former weekly competitor
- Jeremy Mayfield – former weekly competitor
- Chase Montgomery – ran the full 2000 season
- Deborah Renshaw – became the first woman to ever lead a NASCAR sanctioned series when the young woman climbed to the top of the points standings at Fairgrounds Speedway at Nashville.
- Darrell Waltrip – 2 time track champion

== Use in gaming ==
The track was used in the Grand National Expansion Pack for Sierra's NASCAR Racing 2 game and was later converted for use in NASCAR Racing 1999 Edition, NASCAR4, NASCAR 2002 and NASCAR 2003. In October 2019, iRacing scanned the facility to be added into their service for their 2020 Season 4 release in September 2020. The track is also featured in SRX: The Game, released in 2021.

== See also ==
- Geodis Park – Soccer stadium opened in 2022 located adjacent to the speedway.
