= Southern Oregon Speedway =

Race track in the United States

Coordinates: 42°25′2″N 122°48′4″W

- Location: Jackson County, at 6900 Kershaw Rd; White City, Oregon, 97503
- Capacity: 2,500 bleacher and 2,000 lawn
- Owner: Jackson County, OR (Southern Oregon Motorsports: Travis Hoppes)
- Opened: May, 1996
- Construction cost: $1.5 million

Dirt Oval
- Surface: clay, dirt
- Length: 0.375 mi (.604 km)
- Race lap record: 11.108 (Justyn Cox, 410 Sprint)

Southern Oregon Speedway is a 3/8-mile banked dirt race track located at the Jackson County Sports Park near White City, Oregon, United States.

The speedway is part of the Jackson County Sports Park, which also contains a shooting range, a dragstrip, and a go-kart track.

Southern Oregon Speedway was opened in 1996, following the closure of the historic Medford Speedway at the Jackson County Posse Grounds in 1989. The track was built to continue the tradition of grassroots dirt racing, and quickly gained popularity with fans and drivers alike. In the early 2020s, the track saw a temporary decline in operations. In 2021, the track went inactive after lease complications and operational challenges. It remained dormant and partially abandoned until a revival in 2024 under new management.

The track operates on a weekly basis from April through October each year, weather permitting. It features several classes of race cars: Mini Stock, Super 4, Pro Stock, Dwarf, and Modified. Other classes, like 360 Sprint, 410 Sprint and Late Model, are featured on an irregular basis.

Since 2022, the "NARC 410 King of The West Sprint Car Series" has raced at Southern Oregon, kicking off a speed week labeled "The Fastest Five Days in Motorsports" and always been the first race of the week.
