= Butch Miller (racing driver) =

American racing driver (born 1952)

- Born: Henry Miller; June 5, 1952 (age 74); Coopersville, Michigan, U.S.
- Achievements: 1987, 1988, 1994 American Speed Association Champion; 1988 ARTGO Challenge Series champion 1988, 1995 Slinger Nationals Winner
- Awards: 1995 NASCAR SuperTruck Series Most Popular Driver

NASCAR Cup Series career
- 41 races run over 6 years
- Best finish: 27th (1990)
- First race: 1986 Valleydale 500 (Bristol)
- Last race: 1994 AC-Delco 500 (Rockingham)
Wins	Top tens	Poles
0	1	0

NASCAR O'Reilly Auto Parts Series career
- 93 races run over 8 years
- Best finish: 7th (1992)
- First race: 1985 Budweiser 200 (Bristol)
- Last race: 2002 Sam's Town 250 (Memphis)
- First win: 1986 Kroger 200 (IRP)
- Last win: 1991 Mountain Dew 400 (Hickory)
Wins	Top tens	Poles
2	27	4

NASCAR FedEx Freight Truck Series career
- 149 races run over 13 years
- 2011 position: 49th
- Best finish: 4th (1995)
- First race: 1995 Skoal Bandit Copper World Classic (Phoenix)
- Last race: 2011 Coca-Cola 250 (Talladega)
- First win: 1995 Total Petroleum 200 (Colorado)
Wins	Top tens	Poles
1	51	1
- Statistics up to date as of March 8, 2012.

Henry "Butch" Miller (born June 5, 1952) is an American former stock car racing driver. He is a multi-time champion in the American Speed Association stock car series.

== NASCAR ==
=== Early career ===
In 1985, Miller ran his first Busch Series races, driving for LeRoy Throop, driving the No. 08 MSW Spyders Pontiac in four events. He made four races, and had a second-place finish at Bristol Motor Speedway. The next year, in 1986, he went to victory lane at the Indianapolis Raceway Park. That same season, he made his Winston Cup debut, finishing sixteenth in his first race. He ran two Cup races the next season for Throop, and then two races in the No. 31 Slender You Figure Salons Oldsmobile for Bob Clark in 1988. In 1989, he returned to Throop in the No. 51 for nine races. Despite getting sponsorship from Fruit of the Loom, he was only able to finish two races. He signed with Travis Carter Enterprises to drive the No. 98 Chevrolet Lumina for 1990, with sponsorship from Banquet Foods, IGA, and Piggy Wiggly. He drove in the first 23 races of the season, and had a career-best eighth place finish at Pocono Raceway, but was released near the end of the season.

Miller ran his first full Busch Series season in 1991, beginning in the No. 52 31-W Insulation Oldsmobile/Chevy with Day Enterprise Racing. He won his most recent race early in the season at Hickory, but left in the middle of the season to join the No. 75 Food Country U.S.A. Oldsmobile for Henderson Motorsports. In 1992, as he scored ten top-tens and finished seventh in points. He ran nine races in 1993 before he was released, and spent the rest of the season out of NASCAR. He ran two Cup races in 1994, driving the No. 55 Ford Thunderbird for RaDiUs Racing.

=== Truck Series ===
In 1995, Miller joined the fledgling Craftsman Truck Series, driving the No. 98 Raybestos Ford for Liberty Racing. He won a race at Colorado National Speedway beating Mike Skinner by 0.001 seconds in the closest finish in series history and finished fourth in points. He continued to run full-time through 1998. He stayed with Herrick until the latter part of 1996, where he ran some races for Ernie Irvan and Walker Evans. He signed with Evans full-time for the 1997, where he had twelve top-tens in the No. 20 Orleans Hotel & Casino Ford. In 1998, Miller moved to L&R Racing as driver of the No. 18 Dana Dodge Ram. He fell to fifteenth in points, but took the No. 18 and Dana to Bobby Hamilton Racing for the 1999 season. Miller made nine races in 1999 for Hamilton when he resigned from the team to move back to the Busch Series, replacing Stanton Barrett in the No. 40 Channellock Chevy for Galaxy Motorsports. He had two top-ten finishes in six starts, but after two consecutive DNQ's, he was released.

Miller also won the Snowball Derby, a prestigious late model race, in 1987. Miller was inducted into the Michigan Motorsports Hall of Fame in 1997.

=== Return to racing ===
After that season, Miller stayed out of driving until 2002, serving briefly as crew chief for Larry Foyt's ASA team, as well serving as a broadcaster for ASA races. He returned to the Truck Series at Daytona International Speedway, finishing seventeenth in the No. 61 Delco Remy/Team Rensi Motorsports Chevrolet Silverado. A few weeks later, he returned to Henderson and the Busch Series and made ten starts, his best finish being a fifteenth. After another year out of the series, he returned to drive a pair of Truck races in the No. 20 Timber Wolf for Ken Weaver and No. 08 ASI Limited for Gene Christensen, respectively. The following season, he drove in three races for Green Light Racing, and had a tenth-place finish at Mansfield Motorsports Park. He ran another pair of races for Green Light in 2006, but could not finish higher than 26th. After another season off, he drove in nine races for Green Light in the No. 0/No. 07 Silverado for SS-Green Light, but did not finish a race. Miller drove for SS-Green Light on and off between 2009–2011, but primarily served under the role of crew chief to the multitude of young drivers piloting the No. 07.

== Motorsports career results ==
=== NASCAR ===
(key) (Bold – Pole position awarded by qualifying time. Italics – Pole position earned by points standings or practice time. * – Most laps led.)

==== Winston Cup Series ====
NASCAR Winston Cup Series results
Year	Team	No.	Make	1	2	3	4	5	6	7	8	9	10	11	12	13	14	15	16	17	18	19	20	21	22	23	24	25	26	27	28	29	30	31	NWCC	Pts	Ref
1986	Miller Racing	08	Buick	DAY	RCH	CAR	ATL	BRI; 16	DAR	NWS	MAR	TAL	DOV	CLT	RSD	POC																			75th	164	
1986	Miller Racing	08	Chevy														MCH; 21	DAY	POC	TAL	GLN	MCH; 33	BRI	DAR	RCH	DOV	MAR	NWS	CLT	CAR	ATL	RSD			75th	164	
1987	Miller Racing	08	Chevy	DAY	CAR	RCH	ATL	DAR	NWS	BRI	MAR	TAL	CLT	DOV	POC	RSD	MCH; 36	DAY	POC	TAL	GLN	MCH	BRI	DAR	RCH	DOV	MAR	NWS	CLT	CAR; 39	RSD	ATL; DNQ			102nd	46	
1988	Bob Clark Motorsports	31	Olds	DAY	RCH	CAR	ATL	DAR	BRI	NWS	MAR	TAL	CLT	DOV	RSD	POC	MCH	DAY	POC	TAL	GLN	MCH	BRI; 17	DAR	RCH; 25	DOV	MAR	CLT	NWS	CAR	PHO	ATL			NA	0	
1989	Miller Racing	51	Chevy	DAY	CAR; 42	ATL	RCH; 26	DAR	BRI; 31	NWS	MAR	TAL; DNQ	CLT; 42	DOV	SON	POC	MCH; 38	DAY	POC	TAL	GLN	MCH; 22	BRI	DAR	RCH; 21	DOV	MAR; 32	CLT	NWS	CAR					39th	576	
1989	Miller Racing	1	Chevy																												PHO; 43	ATL			39th	576	
1990	Travis Carter Enterprises	98	Chevy	DAY; 22	RCH; 28	CAR; 13	ATL; 20	DAR; 17	BRI; 14	NWS; 25	MAR; 18	TAL; 16	CLT; 18	DOV; 14	SON; 31	POC; 23	MCH; 23	DAY; 23	POC; 8	TAL; 34	GLN; 25	MCH; 12	BRI; 16	DAR; 29	RCH; 19	DOV; 17	MAR	NWS	CLT	CAR	PHO	ATL			27th	2377	
1994	RaDiUs Motorsports	55	Ford	DAY	CAR	RCH	ATL	DAR	BRI	NWS	MAR	TAL	SON	CLT	DOV	POC	MCH	DAY	NHA	POC	TAL	IND	GLN	MCH	BRI	DAR; 18	RCH	DOV	MAR	NWS	CLT; DNQ	CAR; 20	PHO	ATL	53rd	212	
1995	RaDiUs Motorsports	66	Ford	DAY	CAR	RCH	ATL	DAR	BRI; DNQ	NWS	MAR	TAL	SON	CLT	DOV	POC	MCH	DAY	NHA	POC	TAL	IND	GLN	MCH	BRI	DAR	RCH	DOV	MAR	NWS	CLT	CAR	PHO	ATL	NA	-	

===== Daytona 500 =====
Year	Team	Manufacturer	Start	Finish
1990	Travis Carter Enterprises	Chevrolet	17	22

==== Busch Series ====
NASCAR Busch Series results
Year	Team	No.	Make	1	2	3	4	5	6	7	8	9	10	11	12	13	14	15	16	17	18	19	20	21	22	23	24	25	26	27	28	29	30	31	32	33	34	NBSC	Pts	Ref
1985	Miller Racing	08	Pontiac	DAY	CAR	HCY	BRI; 24	MAR	DAR	SBO	LGY	DOV	CLT	SBO	HCY	ROU					MLW; 15	BRI; 2	DAR	RCH	NWS	ROU	CLT	HCY	CAR	MAR								72nd	118	
1985	Miller Racing	62	Pontiac														IRP; 11	SBO	LGY	HCY																		72nd	118	
1986	Miller Racing	08	Pontiac	DAY	CAR	HCY	MAR; 28	BRI; 7	DAR	SBO	LGY	JFC	DOV	CLT	SBO	HCY	ROU	IRP; 1	SBO	RAL	OXF	SBO	HCY	LGY	ROU	BRI	DAR	RCH	DOV	MAR	ROU	CLT	CAR	MAR				54th	259	
1989	Henderson Motorsports	75	Olds	DAY	CAR	MAR	HCY	DAR	BRI	NZH	SBO	LAN	NSV	CLT	DOV	ROU	LVL	VOL	MYB	SBO	HCY	DUB	IRP	ROU	BRI	DAR	RCH	DOV	MAR; 9	CLT	CAR	MAR						100th	-	
1991	Day Enterprise Racing	52	Olds	DAY; 12	RCH; 29	CAR; 30	MAR; 29	VOL; 3	HCY; 1																													16th	3255	
1991	Day Enterprise Racing	52	Chevy							DAR; 20	BRI; 16		SBO; 18	NZH; 16	CLT; 11	DOV; 26	ROU; 19	HCY; 29																				16th	3255	
1991	Beard Motorsports	00	Olds									LAN; 23																										16th	3255	
1991	Burgess Racing	37	Olds																MYB; 17	GLN																		16th	3255	
1991	Henderson Motorsports	75	Olds																		OXF; 22	NHA	SBO; 10	DUB; 10	IRP; 15	ROU; 3	BRI; 10	DAR; 21	RCH; 22	**DOV**; 12	CLT; DNQ	NHA; 6		MAR; 11				16th	3255	
1991	Henderson Motorsports	75	Chevy																														CAR; 12					16th	3255	
1992	Henderson Motorsports	75	Olds	DAY; 22	CAR; 15	RCH; 30	ATL; 15	MAR; 7	DAR; 3	**BRI**; 23	HCY; 9	LAN; 16	DUB; 21	NZH; 12	CLT; 17	DOV; 7	ROU; 8	MYB; 16	GLN; 8	VOL; 16	NHA; 19	TAL; 25	IRP; 4	ROU; 18	MCH; 24	NHA; 11	BRI; 10	DAR; 23	RCH; 25	DOV; 22		**MAR**; 3	CAR; 19	HCY; 2				7th	3725	
1992	Henderson Motorsports	75	Chevy																												CLT; 13							7th	3725	
1993	Henderson Motorsports	75	Chevy	DAY; 12									CLT; 15	DOV	MYB	GLN	MLW	TAL	IRP	MCH	NHA	BRI	DAR	RCH	DOV	ROU	CLT	MAR	CAR	HCY	ATL							31st	1182	
1993	Henderson Motorsports	75	Olds		CAR; 9	RCH; 10	DAR; 37	BRI; 28	HCY; 14	ROU; 5	**MAR**; 20	NZH; 5																										31st	1182	
1999	Galaxy Motorsports	40	Chevy	DAY	CAR	LVS	ATL	DAR	TEX	NSV	BRI	TAL	CAL	NHA	RCH	NZH	CLT	DOV	SBO	GLN; 6	MLW; 18	MYB; 22	PPR; 28	GTY; 23	IRP; 9	MCH; DNQ	BRI; DNQ	DAR	RCH	DOV	CLT	CAR	MEM	PHO	HOM			59th	667	
2002	Henderson Motorsports	75	Chevy	DAY	CAR	LVS	DAR; 33	BRI; 15	TEX	NSH; 21	TAL	CAL	RCH; 19	NHA	NZH	CLT	DOV	NSH; 16	KEN; 18	MLW	DAY; 32	CHI	GTY	PPR	IRP; 34	MCH	BRI; 22	DAR	RCH; DNQ	DOV	KAN	CLT	MEM; 31	ATL	CAR	PHO	HOM	47th	907	

==== Camping World Truck Series ====
NASCAR Camping World Truck Series results
Year	Team	No.	Make	1	2	3	4	5	6	7	8	9	10	11	12	13	14	15	16	17	18	19	20	21	22	23	24	25	26	27	NCWTC	Pts	Ref
1995	Liberty Racing	98	Ford	PHO; 7	TUS; 9	SGS; 4	MMR; 5	POR; 3	EVG; 3	I70; 3	LVL; 3	BRI; 3	MLW; 18	CNS; 1	HPT; 8	IRP; 12	FLM; 14	RCH; 35	MAR; 25	NWS; 2	SON; 7	MMR; 6	PHO; 22								4th	2812	
1996	Liberty Racing	98	Ford	HOM; 24	PHO; 3	POR; 5	EVG; 27	TUS; 16	CNS; 2	HPT; 19	BRI; 11	NZH; 3	MLW; 27	LVL; 9	**I70**; 11	IRP; 13	FLM; 10	GLN; 11	NSV; 4	RCH; 7	NHA; 26	MAR; 2	NWS; 3								7th	3126	
1996	Irvan-Simo Racing	28	Ford																					SON; 26							7th	3126	
1996	Walker Evans Racing	19	Dodge																						MMR; 6	PHO; 13	LVS; 13				7th	3126	
1997	Walker Evans Racing	20	Ford	WDW; 2																											11th	3185	
1997	Walker Evans Racing	20	Chevy		TUS; 4	HOM; 9	PHO; 30	POR; 3	EVG; 10	I70; 5	NHA; 14	TEX; 15	BRI; 20	NZH; 23	MLW; 14	LVL; 29	CNS; 10	HPT; 29	IRP; 17	FLM; 8	NSV; 3	GLN; 26	RCH; 10	MAR; 6	SON; 15	MMR; 17	CAL; 18	PHO; 8			11th	3185	
1997	Walker Evans Racing	21	Chevy																										LVS; 28		11th	3185	
1998	L&R Racing	18	Dodge	WDW; 9	HOM; 21	PHO; 31	POR; 11	EVG; 10	I70; 13	GLN; 20	TEX; 13	BRI; 33	MLW; 10	NZH; 4	CAL; 10	PPR; 16	IRP; 15	NHA; 30	FLM; 21	NSV; 28	HPT; 6	LVL; 14	RCH; 5	MEM; 12	GTY; 28	MAR; 28	SON; 28	MMR; 7	PHO; 33	LVS; 10	15th	3034	
1999	Bobby Hamilton Racing	18	Dodge	HOM; 9	PHO; 26	EVG; 16	MMR; 9	MAR; 27	MEM; 10	PPR; 10	I70; 20	BRI; 13	TEX	PIR	GLN	MLW	NSV	NZH	MCH	NHA	IRP	GTY	HPT	RCH	LVS	LVL	TEX				28th	1188	
1999	Gloy/Rahal Racing	55	Ford																									CAL; 11			28th	1188	
2002	Team Rensi Motorsports	61	Chevy	DAY; 17	DAR	MAR	GTY	PPR	DOV	TEX	MEM	MLW	KAN	KEN	NHA	MCH	IRP	NSH	RCH	TEX	SBO	LVS	CAL	PHO	HOM						80th	112	
2004	Ken Weaver Racing	20	Chevy	DAY	ATL	MAR	MFD	CLT	DOV	TEX	MEM	MLW	KAN	KEN	GTY	MCH	IRP; 24	NSH	BRI												63rd	209	
2004	Green Light Racing	08	Chevy																	RCH; 15	NHA	LVS	CAL	TEX	MAR	PHO	DAR	HOM			63rd	209	
2005	Green Light Racing	07	Chevy	DAY	CAL	ATL	MAR	GTY	MFD; 10																						53rd	343	
2005	Green Light Racing	08	Chevy							CLT; 16	DOV	TEX	MCH	MLW	KAN	KEN	MEM	IRP; 23	NSH	BRI	RCH	NHA	LVS	MAR	ATL	TEX	PHO	HOM			53rd	343	
2006	Green Light Racing	08	Chevy	DAY	CAL	ATL	MAR; 27	GTY	CLT	MFD	DOV																				67th	152	
2006	Green Light Racing	07	Chevy									TEX; 31	MCH	MLW	KAN	KEN	MEM	IRP	NSH	BRI	NHA	LVS	TAL	MAR	ATL	TEX	PHO	HOM			67th	152	
2008	SS-Green Light Racing	0	Chevy	DAY	CAL; 35	ATL; 32	MAR	KAN	CLT	MFD	DOV; 36	TEX; 32	MCH	MLW	MEM	KEN	IRP	NSH	BRI	GTW; 35						TEX; 27	PHO; 35	HOM			43rd	524	
2008	SS-Green Light Racing	07	Chevy																		NHA; 31	LVS	TAL	MAR	ATL; 32						43rd	524	
2009	SS-Green Light Racing	08	Chevy	DAY; 30	CAL; 31	ATL; 34	MAR	KAN; 29	CLT	DOV	TEX; 26	MCH	MLW; 31	MEM; 35	KEN	IRP; 33	NSH; 32	BRI; 35	CHI	IOW	GTW; 31	NHA	LVS; 32	MAR	TAL	TEX	PHO	HOM			37th	819	
2010	SS-Green Light Racing	21	Dodge	DAY	ATL; 32	MAR	NSH	KAN	DOV	CLT	TEX	MCH	IOW	GTY; DNQ	IRP; 18			DAR; 30	BRI	CHI											43rd	657	
2010	SS-Green Light Racing	07	Dodge													POC; 34	NSH; 18				KEN; 35	NHA; 32	LVS	MAR	TAL						43rd	657	
2010	SS-Green Light Racing	07	Toyota																							TEX; 35	PHO; 36	HOM			43rd	657	
2011	SS-Green Light Racing	07	Chevy	DAY	PHO	DAR	MAR	NSH	DOV	CLT	KAN	TEX	KEN	IOW	NSH	IRP	POC	MCH; 27	BRI	ATL	CHI	NHA; 30	KEN		TAL; 33	MAR	TEX	HOM			49th	62	
2011	SS-Green Light Racing	07	Toyota																					LVS; 24							49th	62	

=== ARCA Talladega SuperCar Series ===
(key) (Bold – Pole position awarded by qualifying time. Italics – Pole position earned by points standings or practice time. * – Most laps led.)

ARCA Talladega SuperCar Series results
Year	Team	No.	Make	1	2	3	4	5	6	7	8	9	10	11	12	13	14	ATCSC	Pts	Ref
1985	Miller Racing	62	Pontiac	ATL	DAY	ATL	TAL	ATL	SSP	IRP; 11	CSP	FRS	IRP	OEF	ISF	DSF	TOL	113th	-	

Sporting positions
Preceded by Johnny Benson	ASA National Tour Champion; 1994	Succeeded by Bryan Reffner
Preceded by Mark Martin	ASA National Tour Champion; 1987, 1988	Succeeded by Mike Eddy
Preceded by Dick Trickle	ARTGO Challenge Series Champion; 1987, 1988	Succeeded by Joe Shear
Achievements
Preceded by Gary Balough	Snowball Derby Winner; 1987	Succeeded by Ted Musgrave
