= Bobby Labonte =

American racing driver (born 1964)

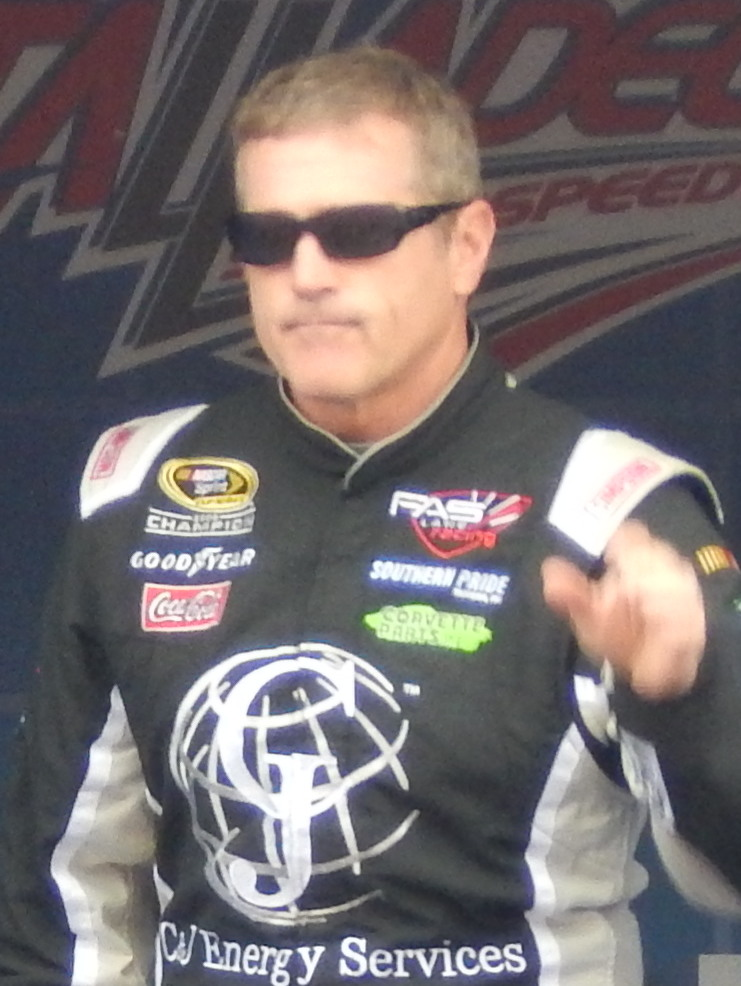
- Labonte at Talladega Superspeedway in 2015
- Born: Robert Allen Labonte; May 8, 1964 (age 62); Corpus Christi, Texas, U.S.
- Achievements: 2000 Winston Cup Series Champion; 1991 Busch Series Champion; 2001 IROC Champion; 1995 Coca-Cola 600 Winner; 2000 Brickyard 400 Winner; 2000 Southern 500 Winner; Oldest winner of a Superstar Racing Experience race (58 years, 2 months, and 1 day old at Nashville Fairgrounds Speedway in 2022)
- Awards: NASCAR Hall of Fame (2020); Named one of NASCAR's 75 Greatest Drivers (2023)

NASCAR Cup Series career
- 729 races run over 25 years
- Best finish: 1st (2000)
- First race: 1991 Budweiser 500 (Dover)
- Last race: 2016 Hellmann's 500 (Talladega)
- First win: 1995 Coca-Cola 600 (Charlotte)
- Last win: 2003 Ford 400 (Homestead)
Wins	Top tens	Poles
21	203	26

NASCAR O'Reilly Auto Parts Series career
- 203 races run over 20 years
- Best finish: 1st (1991)
- First race: 1982 Autumn 150 (Martinsville)
- Last race: 2016 PowerShares QQQ 300 (Daytona)
- First win: 1991 Budweiser 250 (Bristol)
- Last win: 2007 Aaron's 312 (Talladega)
Wins	Top tens	Poles
10	100	10

NASCAR FedEx Freight Truck Series career
- 10 races run over 5 years
- Best finish: 36th (2005)
- First race: 1996 GM Goodwrench/AC Delco 300 (Phoenix)
- Last race: 2007 Michigan 200 (Michigan)
- First win: 2005 Kroger 250 (Martinsville)
Wins	Top tens	Poles
1	5	0
- Statistics up to date as of February 3, 2022.

Robert Allen Labonte (born May 8, 1964) is an American semi-retired professional stock car racing driver and current analyst for NASCAR on Fox. He also currently competes part-time in the SMART Modified Tour, driving the No. 18L for Hermie Sadler and Bill Stanley. Labonte is the 2000 NASCAR Winston Cup Series champion. He and his older brother, Terry Labonte, are one of only two pairs of brothers to have both won the Cup championships (along with Kurt Busch and Kyle Busch). He is also the uncle of former Xfinity Series race winner Justin Labonte.

A native of Corpus Christi, Texas, Labonte was the first driver (second overall) to have won both the Winston Cup championship (2000) and the Busch Series championship (1991) since Ned Jarrett and the first to do so under the revised points championship format. He also won the IROC title in 2001. Labonte is also the first driver to complete the NASCAR Triple Threat at the same track, by winning races at Martinsville in each of NASCAR's top three racing series.

== Early life ==
Labonte was born on May 8, 1964, in Corpus Christi, Texas. He began racing in 1969 in quarter midgets in his home state of Texas, winning his first feature race one year later. From then until 1977, he drove in quarter-midgets throughout the United States, winning many races. In 1978, he advanced to the go-kart ranks but moved to North Carolina with his family following older brother Terry's advancement to the Winston Cup Series. In 1980, Bobby made his NASCAR International Sedan Series debut in Atlanta, finishing third. Two years later, he made his debut in the NASCAR Xfinity Series (subsequently rebranded as the Busch Series) at Martinsville Speedway, where he finished thirtieth. Following his graduation from Trinity High School in 1982, he worked as a fabricator on Terry's cars at Hagan Racing. Labonte returned to the Busch Series in 1985, running two races in a car he owned himself at Martinsville. In his first race, he finished 30th, bringing home only $220, but he improved to seventeenth place in his next race.

The next season, he helped prepare a car that his older brother would drive, which resulted in Terry's first ever NASCAR Busch Grand National Series pole position start and a subsequent second-place finish at Road Atlanta. Labonte's main success came driving late-model stock cars. In 1987, Labonte won twelve races at Caraway Speedway, clinching the track championship, in addition to working for Jay Hedgecock. The following season, he competed at Concord Motorsports Park, winning six times, and ran six more Busch races, finishing sixteenth at Darlington Raceway. The next season, he ran seven more races in the Busch Series and had his first top-five finish at Rockingham Speedway to go with two more finishes in the top ten.

== Full-time driving ==
=== Busch/Nationwide/Xfinity ===
==== 1990 ====
By 1990, Labonte had finally earned enough money to race in the Busch Series on a full-time basis. He founded his own team and drove the No. 44 Oldsmobile. He was successful, winning two poles (both at Bristol Motor Speedway), scoring six top-fives, and seventeen top-tens. He ended up finishing fourth in the standings and was also voted the Busch Series' "Most Popular Driver."

==== 1991 ====
In the next season, Labonte continued his second-division success by winning the NASCAR Busch Series championship with two wins, ten top-fives, and 21 top-tens. He also won his first Busch Series race, at Bristol, then won again at O'Reilly Raceway Park in August.

In addition to his Busch Series schedule, Labonte made two Winston Cup starts in a Bobby Labonte Racing car at Dover and Michigan International Speedway, finishing 34th and 38th, respectively. He won his first Busch Series title.

==== 1992 ====
Labonte's 1992 season was a successful one, and he ended up winning three races (at Lanier, Hickory, and Martinsville respectively), but lost the championship title to Joe Nemechek by three points. That championship finish is, to date, the second-closest finish in the history of NASCAR's top three series (behind the tiebreaker between Tony Stewart and Carl Edwards in the Sprint Cup Series in 2011).

==== 1993 ====
In 1993, Labonte was called up by Bill Davis Racing to drive in the Winston Cup Series. He signed a contract to drive the No. 22 Ford Thunderbird. In his rookie season, he won his first pole at Richmond International Raceway, collected six top-tens, and finished nineteenth in points. He was also second place behind Jeff Gordon for Rookie of the Year honors. He also competed in two Busch Series races, winning a pole and finishing second and 24th respectively. Also, Labonte continued to operate his main Busch Series team, hiring David Green to drive for him. Green finished third in points for Bobby Labonte Racing.

==== 1994 ====
The next season, 1994, Labonte achieved his second major success as a car owner when his Busch Series driver, David Green, won the championship. It was the second championship, and fifth top-five points finish in five years for Bobby Labonte Racing. He also ran in the Busch Series himself, making twelve starts and earning a victory at Michigan in August. In addition to his Busch Series exploits, Bobby continued running full-time in the Winston Cup series for Bill Davis Racing, driving a Pontiac Grand Prix. He collected one top-five and two top-tens and finished 21st in the standings, just missing out on the top-twenty because of Todd Bodine's two-position points standings gain in the final race of the season.

==== 1996–present ====
In 2007, Labonte won the Busch Series race at Talladega Speedway in April 2007, edging Tony Stewart to the line in a thrilling finish. This was his first Busch Series win since 1998. In the offseason following the 2007 season, Labonte agreed to a fifteen-race contract to drive the No. 21 Chevrolet for Richard Childress Racing in the now-O'Reilly Auto Parts Series for the 2008 season. RCR's No. 21 team earned six victories in 2007 with driver Kevin Harvick and has earned two of the organization's four series championships.

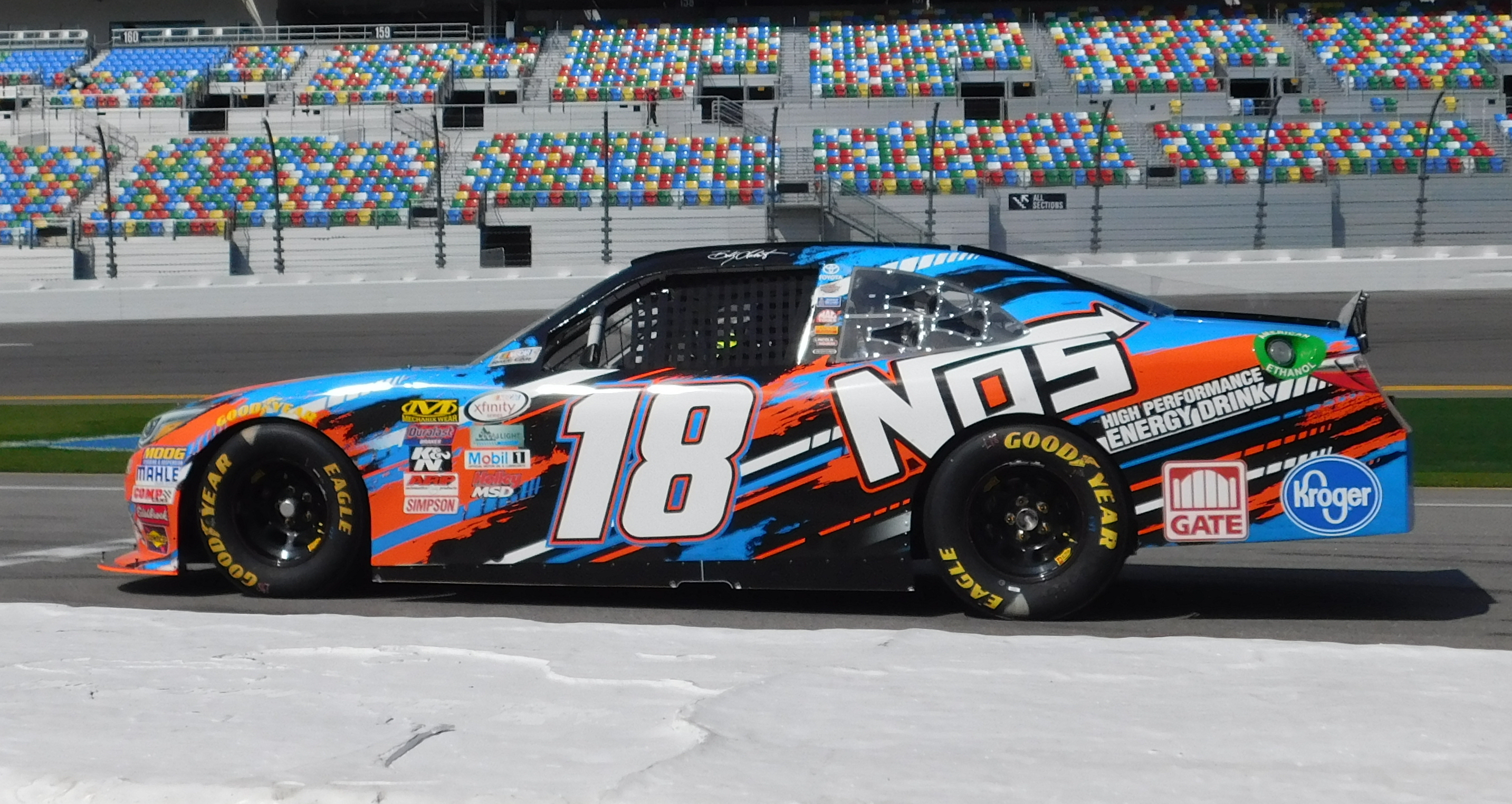
Labonte's 2016 car at Daytona

In 2016, Labonte returned to Joe Gibbs Racing to compete in the Xfinity Series opener at Daytona, driving the No. 18 Camry.

=== Cup Series ===
==== 1995–2000 ====
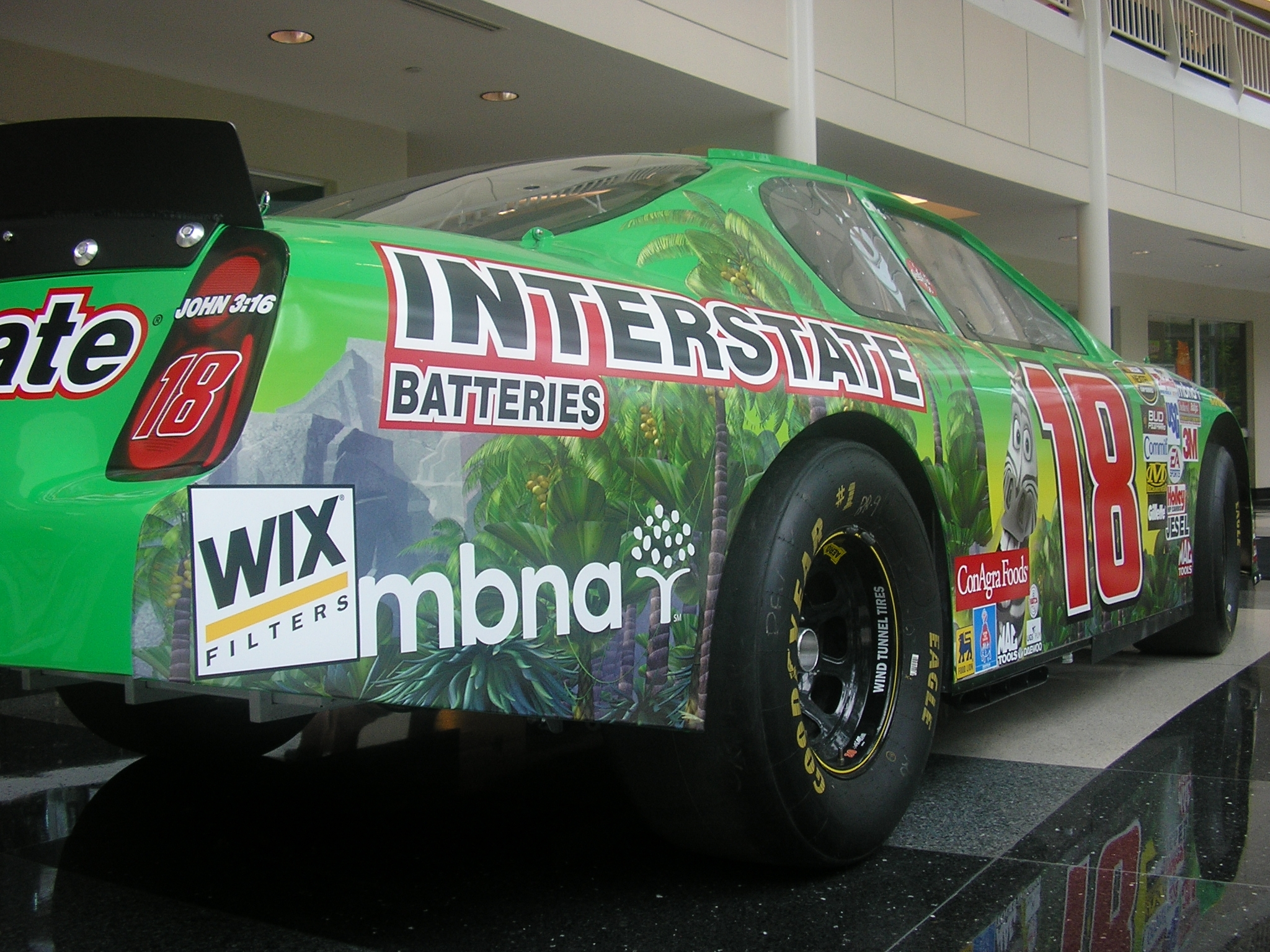
Bobby Labonte's former JGR car on display at the Joe Gibbs Racing headquarters.

At the end of the 1994 season, Labonte departed to replace Dale Jarrett as the driver of the No.18 Interstate Batteries Chevrolet for Joe Gibbs Racing. Labonte would pick up his first career win in the Coca-Cola 600 in 1995, a win he would call later in 2018 the favorite of his career. He would also go on to sweep the races at Michigan and finish tenth in the standings.

In 1996, Labonte won the season-ending race at Atlanta, the same race where his brother Terry won the championship. The two took a victory lap together in what Labonte said was one of the "most emotional and memorable moments of [his] life". That year, he finished eleventh in the points standings. In 1997, Gibbs switched car makes to a Pontiac Grand Prix. Labonte would go on to win the season-ending race at Atlanta for the second year in a row. He ended up seventh in the standings, his best finish at that point in his career.

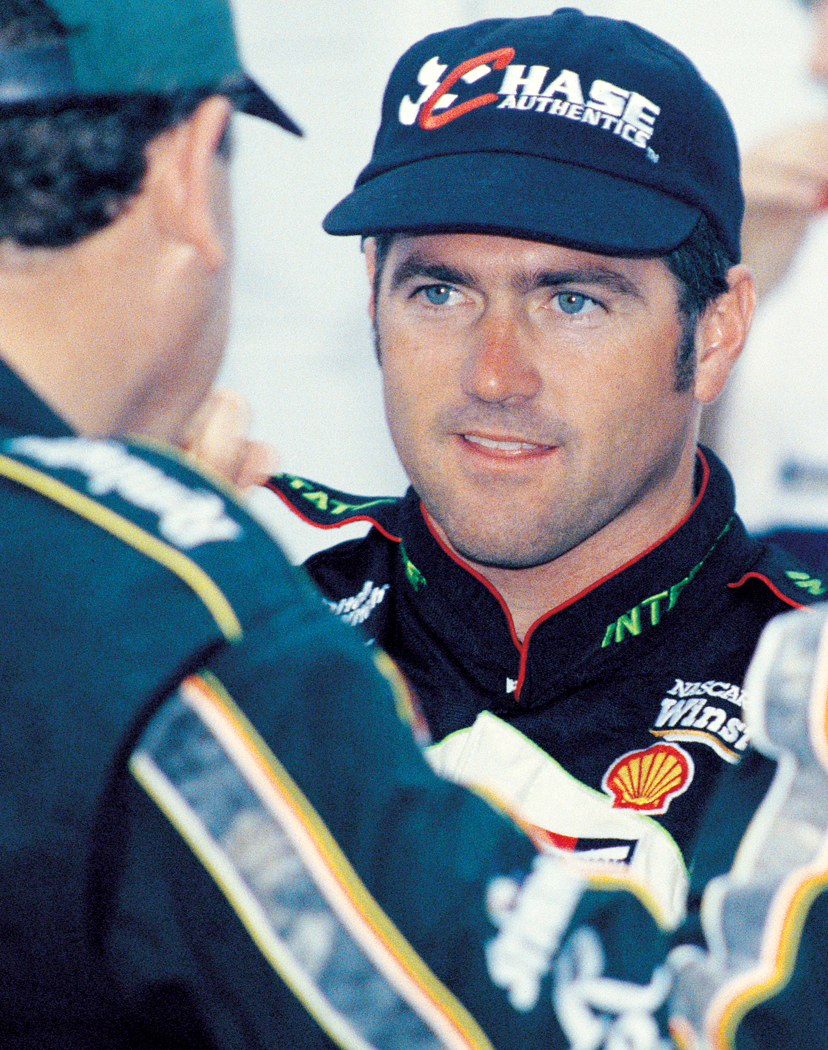
Bobby Labonte at Richmond in 1998.

In 1998, Labonte won at both Atlanta and Talladega, as well as pole positions for both Daytona races, finishing 2nd to Dale Earnhardt in the 500. He finished the year in sixth in final points, improving by a position.

In 1999, Labonte won five Winston Cup races, the most he has ever won in a single season. He won at Dover in the spring, swept both Pocono races (he was the third to accomplish this particular sweep, after Bobby Allison in 1982 and Tim Richmond in 1986; since 1999, Jimmie Johnson in 2004, Denny Hamlin in 2006, and Dale Earnhardt Jr. in 2014 have also done this), the second Michigan race, and the season finale at Atlanta. However, during the season, he suffered a broken shoulder in an accident while qualifying for a Busch Series race at Darlington Raceway, but raced in the Cup event two days later. Labonte started the race, but at the first caution was relieved by Matt Kenseth. He finished second in the points standings to Dale Jarrett, losing the championship by 201 points.

In 2000, Labonte won four races, the early-season race at Rockingham, the Brickyard 400 at Indianapolis, the Southern 500 at Darlington, and the fall race at Charlotte. He led the point standings for 25 weeks straight after taking over at California, and never relinquished it on the way to winning the Winston Cup championship, finishing ahead of Earnhardt by 265 points, completing all but nine of the 10,167 laps that season, with four wins, nineteen top-five finishes, 24 top-ten finishes, three poles, an average finish of 7.4, and had zero times of finishing with a Did not finish (DNF). Labonte became the second driver in NASCAR history to win the championship and not score a single DNF and first since Cale Yarborough in 1977. Labonte is currently the last to accomplish this.

==== 2001–2005 ====
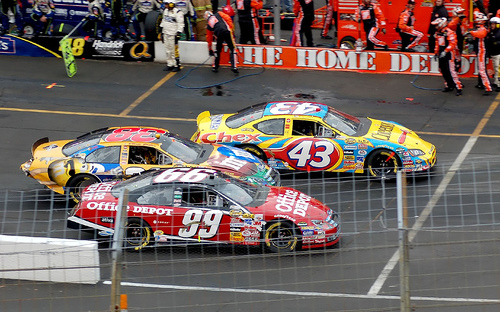
Labonte No. 43 races to the end of pit lane in 2006

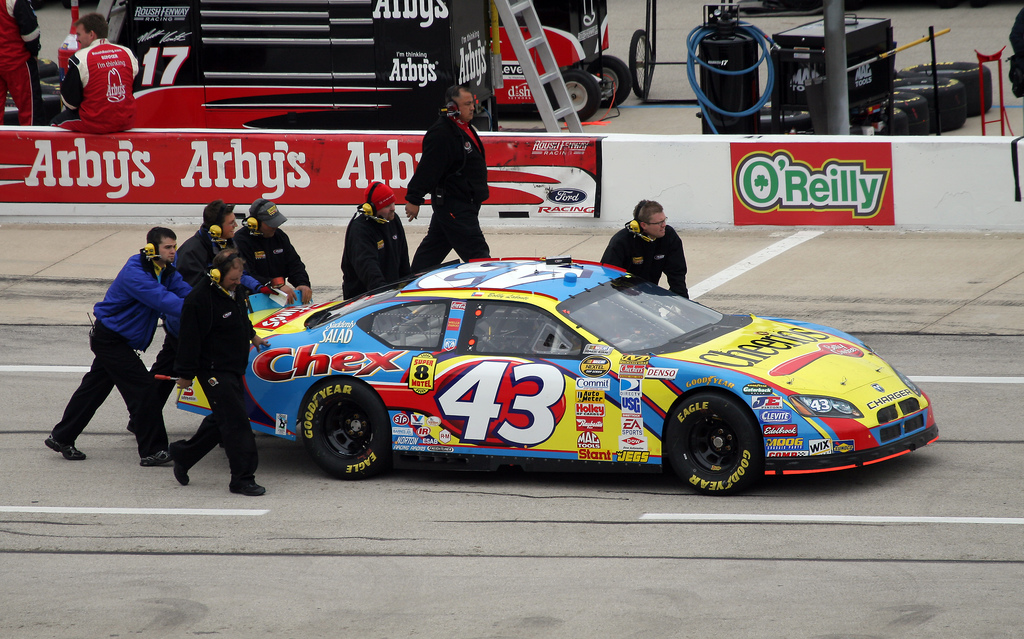
Labonte's 2007 car

Labonte began the 2001 season with a seventh-place finish in the Bud Shootout. At the Daytona 500, he and his teammate Tony Stewart were two of the eighteen drivers involved in a crash on lap 173. Labonte's hood broke off and got attached to Stewart's car, which flipped over twice. After getting out of his, Labonte was seen checking on Stewart to make sure he was okay. The accident was overshadowed by Dale Earnhardt's fatal crash on the last lap of the same race.

The following week at Rockingham, Labonte was narrowly beaten to the finish line by Steve Park in the rain-delayed Dura Lube 400. He did not have another top-ten finish until the Virginia 500 at Martinsville, where he finished eighth. This was followed by a fifth-place finish in the Talladega 500. His next top-ten was another fifth-place finish in the Coca-Cola 600. After less successful finishes at Dover and Michigan, Labonte had a second eighth-place finish at Pocono and a seventh-place finish at Sonoma. Following this was a third fifth-place finish in the Pepsi 400. At the end of July, Labonte won his first points race of the year in the Pennsylvania 500 at Pocono.

After the win, Labonte's next top-ten were a ninth-place finish at Watkins Glen, an eighth-place finish at Bristol, a third-place finish at Darlington, and a sixth-place finish at Richmond. He did not have back-to-back top-tens again until the autumn races at Charlotte and Martinsville, where he finished tenth and fourth respectively.

In the fall at Talladega, Labonte started 34th. He managed to work his way up the field and took the lead on lap 107. He led for 23 laps before falling back in the pack. He retook the lead on lap 184 but was involved in a frightening last-lap crash. After leading three laps, Labonte was leading at the white flag on the outside lane. Going into turn 1, Dale Earnhardt Jr. overtook him in the lower groove, bringing Tony Stewart and Jeff Burton with him. Labonte moved up the track, trying to block Bobby Hamilton, but coming onto the back straightaway, Hamilton tapped him from behind. Labonte made contact with Johnny Benson Jr. — sending that driver into the outside wall — and then spun, flipping over, and skidding partway down the track on his roof. This crash also collected Jason Leffler, Sterling Marlin, Robby Gordon, Mike Wallace, Ricky Craven, Terry Labonte, Buckshot Jones, Ricky Rudd, Ward Burton, and more.

Labonte's next top-ten was another ninth-place finish at Rockingham. After winning at Atlanta and a third-place finish at the postponed New Hampshire 300, he finished sixth in the final points standings.

During 2001, Labonte won the IROC XXV title, becoming the thirteenth consecutive NASCAR driver to win the IROC championship.

In 2002, Labonte only had one win, which was at Martinsville in the spring. He also drove a 9/11 Tribute car in 2002 with the phrase "Let's roll" on the hood. It was his first career short-track win at Martinsville. He went on to finish sixteenth in the final points standings and failed to finish in the Top 10 for the first time since 1996, while his teammate Stewart went on to win the championship.

In 2003, Labonte rebounded and finished eighth in the standings after winning two races (Atlanta and Homestead [leading only the final lap]). Also, Labonte went on a tear during the spring with three straight second-place finishes.

In 2004, Labonte did not win a race for the first time since 1994 (ten years later) and finished twelfth in the points standings.

2005 saw much of the same. Labonte fell out of the top-twenty in points, and only had four top-fives, one of which was a dramatic second at Charlotte Motor Speedway in the Coca-Cola 600. He also went on to race some Truck Series events, which included a win at Martinsville. His win there made him join an elite group of drivers that have won in all three divisions at one track. In fact, with his win, he became the first driver to do so.

He also ran the 24 Hours of Daytona road race, sharing a car with his brother Terry, Jan Magnussen and Bryan Herta. After the disappointing 2005 season, Labonte asked and was granted to be released from Joe Gibbs Racing, having spent the last eleven seasons there. Labonte joined Petty Enterprises to drive the famous No. 43.

==== 2006–2008 ====
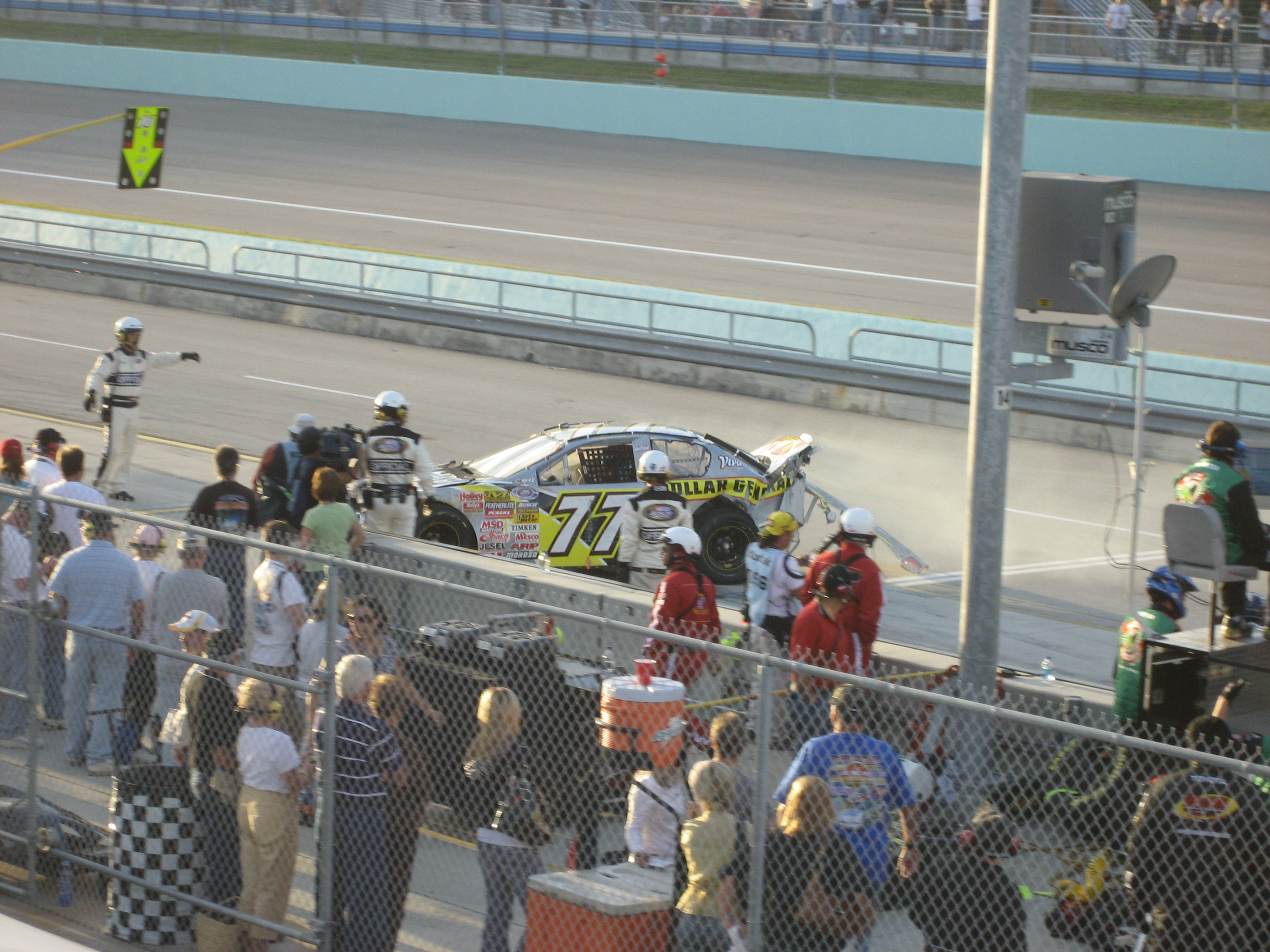
Bobby Labonte brings his car in after a crash during the 2007 Ford 300 at the Homestead.

In his inaugural season in the famous No. 43 car, Labonte collected three top-fives and eight top-tens. His top-fives included an impressive run at Martinsville, where he finished third after being in contention for the win much of the day. He ended up finishing 21st in the points standings, three spots better than he did two years before.

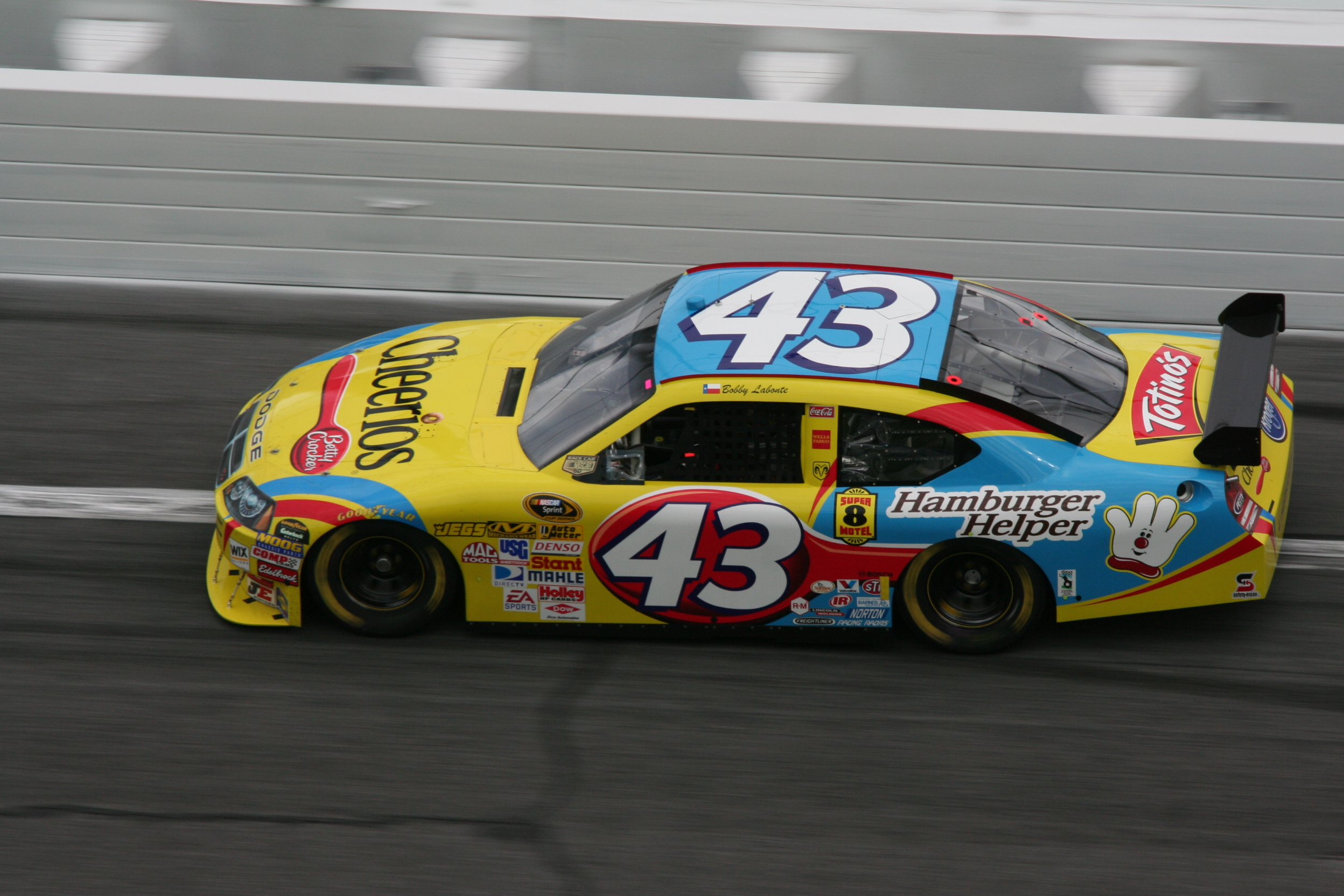
Labonte's 2008 Cup racecar

Labonte began the 2007 season with a 21st-place finish in the Daytona 500, after avoiding the many accidents the race had. Labonte would end the year with no top-fives and only three top-tens. However, due to a more consistent season, he finished eighteenth in the points standings, a three-position improvement over 2006. In November, Labonte formed a full-service marketing agency, Breaking Limits, which is based in Huntersville, North Carolina.

In 2008, Labonte continued his contract with Petty Enterprises, but experienced a largely unsuccessful season, gathering only three top-tens and no top-fives on his way to finishing 21st in the Sprint Cup point standings. In December of that year, Labonte was released from Petty Enterprises while the team was negotiating a deal with a private equity firm that fell through, and Petty partnered with Gillett Evernham Motorsports.

==== 2009 ====
On January 13, 2009, Labonte was confirmed to be the driver of the No. 96 Ford Fusion for Hall of Fame Racing, now in a partnership with Yates Racing. In the 2009 Spring Las Vegas race, the Shelby 427, Labonte recorded his first top-five with Hall of Fame Racing and his best finish since he finished third in the Fall Martinsville race in 2006. However, that was his only top-five run for the year. With eleven races remaining in the 2009 season, Labonte was replaced for Erik Darnell for seven of the final eleven races due to sponsorship problems with the No. 96. Labonte found a ride with TRG Motorsports and it's 71 for the seven races he was out of the 96. In his first race at Atlanta, Labonte ran inside the top-twenty all night and scored an eighteenth-place finish. Two races later Labonte gave TRG its best qualifying effort with an 8th-place start, Labonte came home 22nd. At Talladega, Labonte finished tenth after, at one point, running second in that race to Dale Earnhardt Jr.

==== 2010 ====
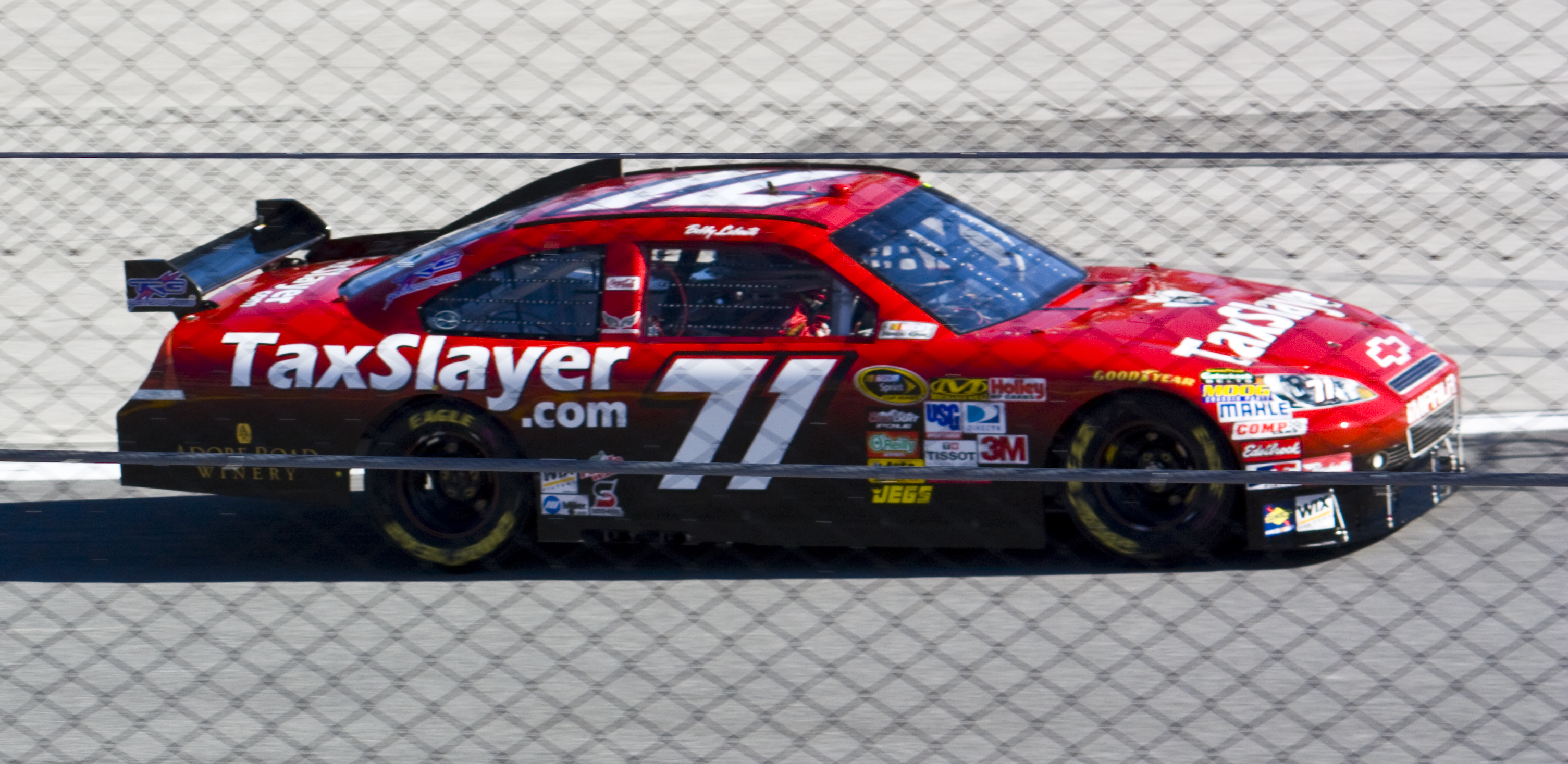
Labonte's car for the first half of the 2010 season

From February 2010 – June 2010, Labonte drove for TRG Motorsports and its No. 71. Even though TRG's 2009 owner points were not enough to make the field guaranteed for the first five races of 2010, Labonte's past championship provisional gave the team that to fall back on, in the case that Labonte's qualifying runs are not fast. For 2010, Labonte was also reunited with Doug Randolph as his crew chief. Randolph finished the 2007 season with Labonte in the No. 43 for Petty Enterprises, posting two of three of Labonte's Top 10 runs. TRG also announced an alliance with Richard Childress Racing for 2010. RCR shared technology and equipment with TRG for the season. They also allied with Stewart Haas Racing, as Tony Stewart will provide a pit crew to the team.

In his first race in the TRG, Labonte finished 21st in the Daytona 500 after he started 42nd with a champions provisional. For much of the race, Labonte was in the top-25. He would end up fading back over the next few races, as he and the team would struggle for consistency. On the May 16th Dover race, due to lack of sponsorship, Labonte and the 71 team parked the car after 66 laps. Arguably, some people might say that this season is the worst of his full-time career, as he only had two top-twenty finishes in 2010 one at the Daytona 500 and one at the Infineon Raceway road course event.

On June 22, 2010, it was announced that Labonte would be leaving the No. 71 due to the team being unable to secure sponsorship. On June 23, Labonte was hired to drive car No. 7 for Robby Gordon Motorsports at New Hampshire in a one-race deal.

C&J Energy Services entered into a partnership with Phoenix Racing which allowed Labonte to be hired to take over the No. 09 car beginning at Daytona and Labonte split the rest of the 2010 season between Phoenix Racing and TRG Motorsports. On October 11, Stavola-Labonte Racing hired Labonte to drive its No. 10 car at Charlotte and Texas in a two-race deal. The team was co-owned by Bobby's older brother Terry. Despite bouncing around, Labonte competed in every race for the 2010 season.

==== 2011–2012 ====
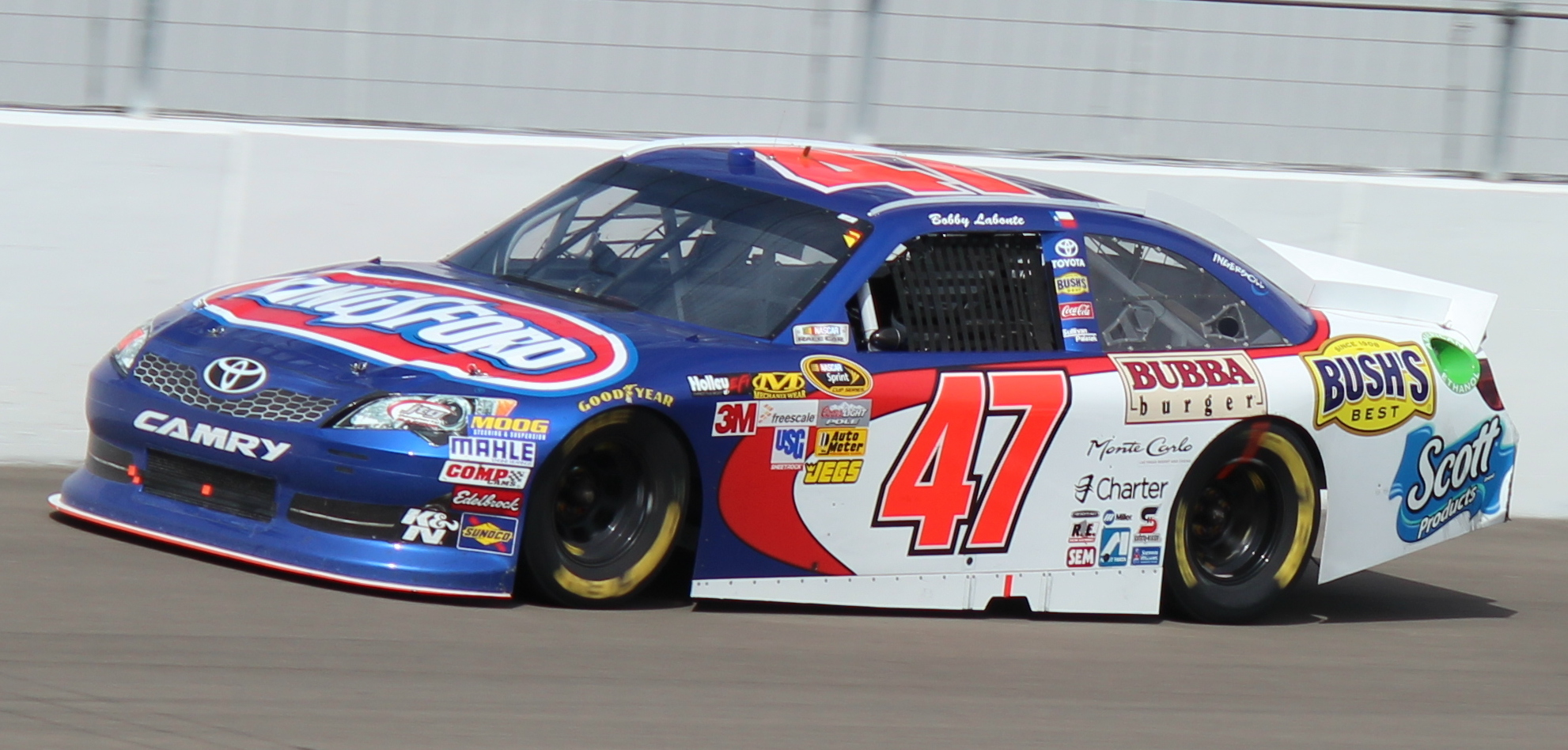
Labonte's No. 47 car during the 2012 Kobalt Tools 400

Labonte replaced Marcos Ambrose as the full-time driver of the No. 47 JTG Daugherty Racing Toyota Camry, with support from Michael Waltrip Racing. He finished fourth in the Daytona 500, earning Labonte his two-hundredth career top-ten finish in the Sprint Cup Series. Earning only one more top-ten finish so far in the season. JTG Daugherty Racing and Michael Waltrip Racing received a penalty for violating sections 12–1, 12-4-J, and 20–3.2.1A. Crew Chief Frankie Kerr was fined $50,000 and was suspended from 4 NASCAR Sprint Cup Championship events, and suspended from NASCAR until November 23. The same penalty was for Michael Waltrip Racing and the car chief for each team. The owners of the numbers 47 (Tad Geschickter); 56 (Michael Waltrip); and 00 (Rob Kauffman); were penalized 25 owner points. The drivers were also penalized 25 driver points.

For the 2012 season, Labonte returned to the No. 47 car with most of the sponsors returning also. JTG Daugherty Racing also announced they will no longer operate out of the Michael Waltrip Racing shop. Todd Berrier took over the role as the crew chief. The crew chief at the time, Frank Kerr, moved to the position of shop foreman.

==== 2013–2016 ====
Labonte ran in the No. 47 for the entire season until the 2013 Quicken Loans 400 at Michigan International Speedway, in which he ran the No. 51 for Phoenix Racing. Labonte ran at Sonoma Raceway in the 47, but was subsequently replaced by A. J. Allmendinger in the 47 for selected races starting at the 2013 Quaker State 400 at Kentucky Speedway, ending Labonte's streak of consecutive starts at 704. The streak was second only to Jeff Gordon's. Later in the year Labonte suffered broken ribs in a cycling accident, forcing him to miss three races, starting with the AdvoCare 500 at Atlanta.

His last race with JTG Daughtery was at Phoenix International Raceway in November 2013; released afterwards, in December 2013 he announced that he would be running part-time in the 2014 NASCAR Sprint Cup Series in a second car for HScott Motorsports. During practice for the 2014 Daytona 500 Labonte blew an engine, and although he qualified for his 22nd consecutive 500, he was relegated to the back of the starting grid. Labonte finished the race in 15th.

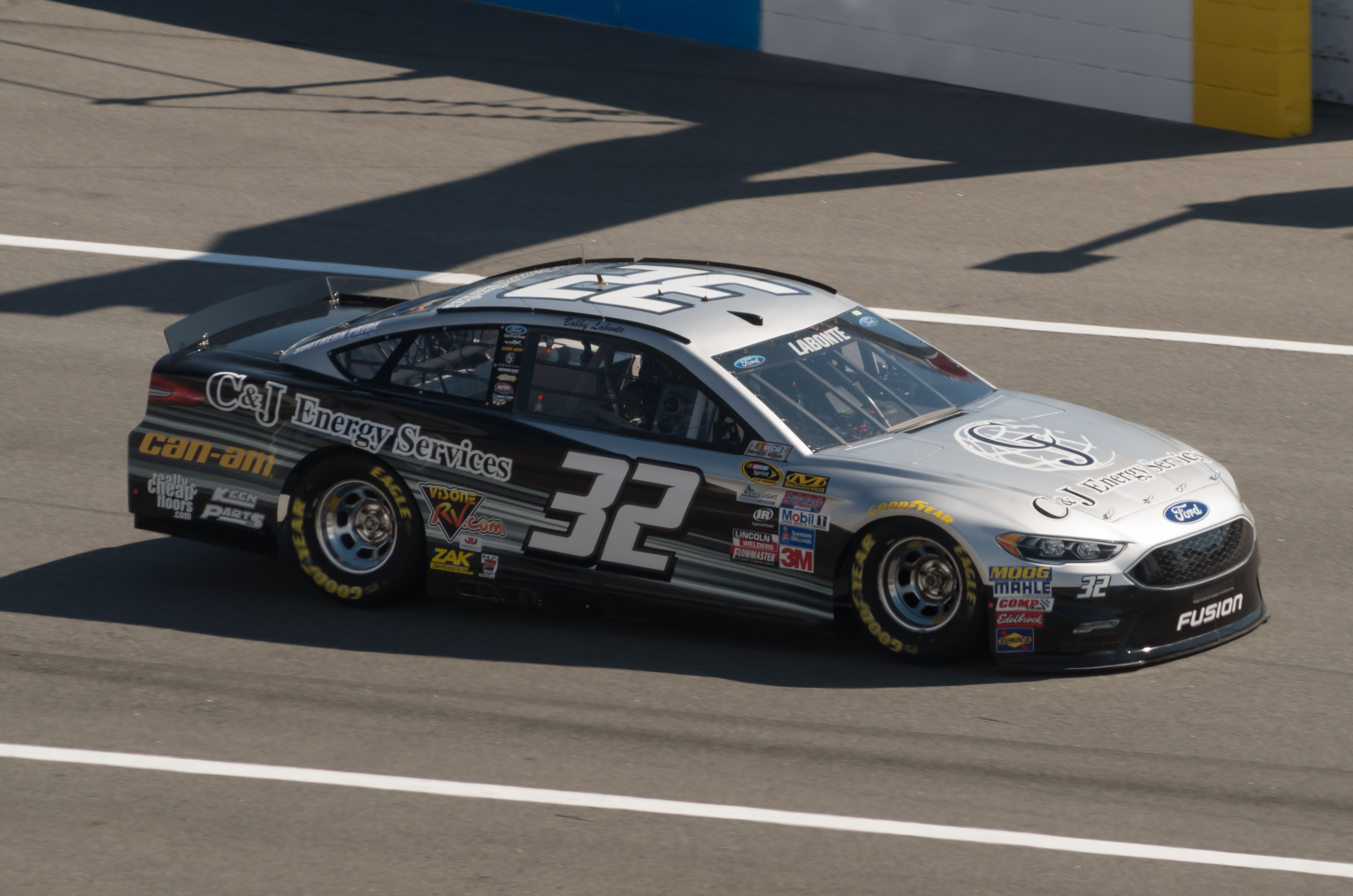
Labonte competed part-time for Go FAS Racing in 2015 and 2016.

A deal to run for James Finch in additional races fell through, thus Labonte did not make another start for the first half of the season. Instead, he tested cars for Richard Childress Racing. At the summer Daytona race, he drove the No. 33 RCR Chevrolet that Brian Scott had driven to the pole at Talladega, running under the Circle Sport banner. Labonte qualified fourth and contended for the lead at the beginning of the race, but was caught up in the Big One, finishing 26th. Tommy Baldwin Racing would field the No. 37 car with Accell Construction as the sponsor for Labonte at Indianapolis.

In December 2014, Labonte announced that he would drive for Go FAS Racing on the restrictor-plate tracks in 2015, taking over for his brother Terry who retired after the 2014 GEICO 500. He finished 24th at the 2015 Daytona 500. In the spring Talladega race, Labonte finished 27th. The 2015 Coke Zero 400 did not go well for Labonte, as he was caught up in an early crash caused by David Gilliland and finished 43rd. For the Fall Talladega race, he finished 23rd, his best finish of the season. In 2016, Labonte received the sponsorship of Bombardier Recreational Products and Cyclops Gear allowing him to run the four restrictor-plate races for Go FAS Racing. For the Daytona 500, Labonte would finish 31st. For Talladega, Labonte would finish 19th. Coming back to Daytona, Labonte would finish 24th. Coming back to Talladega, Labonte would finish 31st. Following the 2016 season, it was announced that Labonte would not return to Go FAS. As of 2025 he has not raced since then.

=== Whelen Euro Series ===
In June 2017, Labonte competed in the NASCAR Whelen Euro Series race weekend at Brands Hatch, driving the No. 1 Ford for Alex Caffi Motorsport. He became the first Cup Series champion to race in the Euro Series. He started 22nd in both of the weekend's two races, and finished tenth and fourteenth.

In 2018, Labonte joined RDV Competition to drive the No. 18 Toyota full-time in the Euro Series.

=== Modifieds/SRX (2021–) ===
Labonte began competing on the SMART Modified Tour in 2021. He won two features in 2021 but couldn't run full-time because of conflicts with him racing in the Superstar Racing Experience (SRX). In 2022, the two series do not have conflicting dates and he is competing full-time on the SMART Tour.

== Broadcasting career ==
In February 2014, it was announced that Labonte would appear as a racing analyst for the new program NASCAR America on NBCSN. He made his TV debut early in the 2014 season.

In 2017, Labonte moved to FS1 as an analyst on Race Hub and Race Day programs.

== Personal life ==
Labonte currently resides in High Point, North Carolina, with his wife Kristin. He has two children from his previous marriage to Donna Slate, Robert Tyler, and Madison, and is an avid outdoorsman. Tyler recently graduated from Texas A&M and is now in law school at Campbell University in Buies Creek, North Carolina. Tyler has worked on political campaigns for Thom Tillis and served in 2014 as an intern for Interstate Batteries, which sponsored Bobby's 2000 championship season. Madison began school at Appalachian State University in the spring of 2017. Labonte's father, Bob, died on April 8, 2024.

Labonte founded Breaking Limits, a marketing, public relations, events and sponsorship agency, working out of High Point, North Carolina. Labonte continues to own a Red Mango yogurt shop on the campus of Duke University. The Bobby Labonte Foundation continues to provide grants to non-profit organizations located in the Triad of North Carolina whose work supports building stronger foundations for children and their families. Labonte also founded Longhorn Chassis with his brother Terry in 2010. Longhorn Chassis builds dirt late model race cars.

== Motorsports career results ==
=== NASCAR ===
(key) (Bold – Pole position awarded by qualifying time. Italics – Pole position earned by points standings or practice time. * – Most laps led.)

==== Sprint Cup Series ====
NASCAR Sprint Cup Series results
Year	Team	No.	Make	1	2	3	4	5	6	7	8	9	10	11	12	13	14	15	16	17	18	19	20	21	22	23	24	25	26	27	28	29	30	31	32	33	34	35	36	NSCC	Pts	Ref
1991	Labonte Motorsports	44	Olds	DAY	RCH	CAR	ATL	DAR	BRI	NWS	MAR	TAL	CLT; DNQ									MCH; 38	BRI	DAR	RCH	DOV	MAR	NWS	CLT	CAR	PHO	ATL								64th	110	
1991	Labonte Motorsports	14	Olds											DOV; 34	SON	POC	MCH	DAY	POC	TAL	GLN																			64th	110	
1993	Bill Davis Racing	22	Ford	DAY; 20	CAR; 33	RCH; 29	ATL; 18	DAR; 18	BRI; 24	NWS; 25	MAR; 12	TAL; 35	SON; 16	CLT; 8	DOV; 19	POC; 20	MCH; 36	DAY; 41	NHA; 10	POC; 15	TAL; 15	GLN; 7	MCH; 8	BRI; 15	DAR; 14	**RCH**; 13	DOV; 7	MAR; 32	NWS; 12	CLT; 28	CAR; 22	PHO; 8	ATL; 14							19th	3221	
1994	Bill Davis Racing	22	Pontiac	DAY; 16	CAR; 19	RCH; 24	ATL; 15	DAR; 39	BRI; 6	NWS; 26	MAR; 19	TAL; 22	SON; 17	CLT; 40	DOV; 20	POC; 25	MCH; 15	DAY; 22	NHA; 13	POC; 13	TAL; 12	IND; 16	GLN; 18	MCH; 5	BRI; 31	DAR; 36	RCH; 24	DOV; 17	MAR; 31	NWS; 15	CLT; 42	CAR; 28	PHO; 16	ATL; 37						21st	3038	
1995	Joe Gibbs Racing	18	Chevy	DAY; 30	CAR; 2	RCH; 30	ATL; 2	DAR; 27	BRI; 32	NWS; 15	**MAR**; 10	TAL; 5	SON; 13	CLT; 1	DOV; 2	POC; 27	MCH; 1	DAY; 41	NHA; 15	POC; 35	TAL; 31	IND; 9	GLN; 6	**MCH**; 1	BRI; 11	DAR; 8	RCH; 17	DOV; 9	MAR; 14	NWS; 18	CLT; 8	CAR; 40	PHO; 37	ATL; 8						10th	3718	
1996	Joe Gibbs Racing	18	Chevy	DAY; 17	CAR; 33	RCH; 23	ATL; 31	DAR; 2	BRI; 7	NWS; 10	MAR; 8	TAL; 24	SON; 9	CLT; 22	DOV; 5	POC; 41	MCH; 12	DAY; 40	NHA; 31	POC; 37	TAL; 8	IND; 24	GLN; 5	MCH; 6	BRI; 32	DAR; 6	RCH; 11	**DOV**; 4	MAR; 21	NWS; 13	**CLT**; 40	CAR; 6	**PHO**; 9	**ATL**; 1*						11th	3590	
1997	Joe Gibbs Racing	18	Pontiac	DAY; 21	CAR; 14	RCH; 8	ATL; 4	DAR; 5	TEX; 3	BRI; 34	MAR; 8	SON; 20	TAL; 3	CLT; 6	**DOV**; 40	POC; 31	MCH; 9	CAL; 6	DAY; 10	NHA; 27	POC; 11	IND; 2	GLN; 37	MCH; 6	BRI; 8	**DAR**; 7	RCH; 34	NHA; 15	DOV; 4	MAR; 27	CLT; 2*	TAL; 2	**CAR**; 11	PHO; 23	ATL; 1*					7th	4101	
1998	Joe Gibbs Racing	18	Pontiac	**DAY**; 2	CAR; 33	LVS; 19	ATL; 1	DAR; 23	BRI; 34	TEX; 8	MAR; 15	**TAL**; 1	CAL; 38	CLT; 3	DOV; 4	RCH; 8	MCH; 7	POC; 15	SON; 4	NHA; 11	POC; 4	IND; 3	GLN; 10	MCH; 2	BRI; 25	NHA; 7	DAR; 15	RCH; 35	DOV; 4	MAR; 10	CLT; 39	TAL; 6	**DAY**; 2	PHO; 23	CAR; 15	ATL; 43				6th	4180	
1999	Joe Gibbs Racing	18	Pontiac	DAY; 25	CAR; 3	**LVS**; 5	**ATL**; 2	DAR; 10	TEX; 3	BRI; 37	MAR; 24	TAL; 4	CAL; 3	RCH; 3	**CLT**; 2	**DOV**; 1	MCH; 5	POC; 1	SON; 27	DAY; 5	NHA; 38	POC; 1	IND; 2	GLN; 24	MCH; 1	BRI; 26	DAR; 19	RCH; 2	NHA; 3	DOV; 5	MAR; 8	**CLT**; 2*	TAL; 7	CAR; 3	PHO; 3	HOM; 2*	ATL; 1*			2nd	5061	
2000	Joe Gibbs Racing	18	Pontiac	DAY; 6	CAR; 1*	LVS; 5	ATL; 2	DAR; 13	BRI; 6	TEX; 3	MAR; 12	TAL; 21	CAL; 2	RCH; 26	CLT; 2	DOV; 3	**MCH**; 3	POC; 13	SON; 4	DAY; 12	NHA; 9	POC; 6	IND; 1	**GLN**; 5	MCH; 3	BRI; 15	DAR; 1	RCH; 15	**NHA**; 2	DOV; 5	MAR; 10	CLT; 1	TAL; 12	CAR; 20	PHO; 5	HOM; 4	ATL; 5			1st	5130	
2001	Joe Gibbs Racing	18	Pontiac	DAY; 40	CAR; 2	LVS; 29	ATL; 33	DAR; 11	BRI; 13	TEX; 42	MAR; 8	TAL; 5	**CAL**; 22	RCH; 10	CLT; 5	DOV; 12	MCH; 13	POC; 8	SON; 7	DAY; 5	CHI; 39	NHA; 7	POC; 1	IND; 15	GLN; 9	MCH; 19	BRI; 8	DAR; 3	RCH; 6	DOV; 36	KAN; 29	CLT; 10	MAR; 4	TAL; 22	PHO; 12	CAR; 9	HOM; 8	ATL; 1	NHA; 3	6th	4561	
2002	Joe Gibbs Racing	18	Pontiac	DAY; 34	CAR; 3	LVS; 12	ATL; 37	DAR; 21	BRI; 5	TEX; 30	MAR; 1	TAL; 41	CAL; 34	RCH; 32	CLT; 14	DOV; 16	POC; 25	MCH; 24	SON; 13	DAY; 32	CHI; 18	NHA; 13	POC; 11	IND; 11	GLN; 23	MCH; 13	BRI; 9	DAR; 15	RCH; 32	NHA; 5	DOV; 41	KAN; 22	TAL; 25	CLT; 2	MAR; 12	ATL; 13	CAR; 7	PHO; 39	HOM; 29	16th	3810	
2003	Joe Gibbs Racing	18	Chevy	DAY; 41	CAR; 16	**LVS**; 4	ATL; 1*	DAR; 37	BRI; 3	**TEX**; 37	TAL; 32	MAR; 2	CAL; 2	RCH; 2	CLT; 3	DOV; 3	POC; 17	**MCH**; 2	SON; 9	DAY; 5	CHI; 36	NHA; 14	POC; 30	IND; 22	GLN; 14	**MCH**; 37	BRI; 27	DAR; 7	RCH; 6	NHA; 16	DOV; 31	TAL; 11	KAN; 17	CLT; 6	MAR; 41	ATL; 5	PHO; 36	CAR; 8	HOM; 1	8th	4377	
2004	Joe Gibbs Racing	18	Chevy	DAY; 11	CAR; 25	LVS; 8	ATL; 18	DAR; 2	BRI; 33	**TEX**; 25	MAR; 2	TAL; 10	CAL; 5	RCH; 3	CLT; 13	DOV; 25	POC; 3	MCH; 8	SON; 33	DAY; 7	CHI; 18	NHA; 17	POC; 29	IND; 15	GLN; 11	MCH; 26	BRI; 16	CAL; 20	RCH; 16	NHA; 18	DOV; 14	TAL; 35	KAN; 16	CLT; 17	MAR; 18	ATL; 20	PHO; 9	DAR; 9	HOM; 12	12th	4277	
2005	Joe Gibbs Racing	18	Chevy	DAY; 43	CAL; 13	LVS; 41	ATL; 37	BRI; 22	MAR; 33	TEX; 38	PHO; 6	TAL; 23	DAR; 17	RCH; 8	CLT; 2	DOV; 38	POC; 26	MCH; 14	SON; 18	DAY; 35	CHI; 13	NHA; 3	POC; 8	IND; 40	GLN; 36	MCH; 16	BRI; 21	CAL; 20	RCH; 22	NHA; 24	DOV; 32	TAL; 11	KAN; 39	CLT; 18	MAR; 4	ATL; 31	TEX; 26	PHO; 5	HOM; 34	24th	3488	
2006	Petty Enterprises	43	Dodge	DAY; 35	CAL; 31	LVS; 30	ATL; 43	BRI; 5	MAR; 32	TEX; 10	PHO; 8	TAL; 29	RCH; 24	DAR; 22	CLT; 17	DOV; 13	POC; 12	MCH; 28	SON; 35	DAY; 42	CHI; 12	NHA; 23	POC; 8	IND; 40	GLN; 24	MCH; 19	BRI; 23	CAL; 26	RCH; 22	NHA; 40	DOV; 7	KAN; 17	TAL; 10	CLT; 5	MAR; 3	ATL; 12	TEX; 16	PHO; 27	HOM; 41	21st	3567	
2007	Petty Enterprises	43	Dodge	DAY; 21	CAL; 28	LVS; 13	ATL; 16	BRI; 22	MAR; 43	TEX; 28	PHO; 8	TAL; 20	RCH; 15	DAR; 19	CLT; 13	DOV; 18	POC; 19	MCH; 34	SON; 33	NHA; 18	DAY; 35	CHI; 20	IND; 19	POC; 30	GLN; 24	MCH; 9	BRI; 8	CAL; 11	RCH; 16	NHA; 22	DOV; 27	KAN; 42	TAL; 35	CLT; 12	MAR; 22	ATL; 41	TEX; 16	PHO; 18	HOM; 23	18th	3517	
2008	Petty Enterprises	43	Dodge	DAY; 11	CAL; 25	LVS; 17	ATL; 12	BRI; 38	MAR; 25	TEX; 20	PHO; 12	TAL; 34	RCH; 13	DAR; 18	CLT; 11	DOV; 32	POC; 11	MCH; 31	SON; 39	NHA; 10	DAY; 13	CHI; 29	IND; 16	POC; 33	GLN; 42	MCH; 27	BRI; 23	CAL; 21	RCH; 21	NHA; 13	DOV; 14	KAN; 24	TAL; 6	CLT; 17	MAR; 37	ATL; 26	TEX; 39	PHO; 19	HOM; 33	21st	3448	
2009	Hall of Fame Racing	96	Ford	DAY; 22	CAL; 20	LVS; 5	ATL; 40	BRI; 22	MAR; 16	TEX; 40	PHO; 29	TAL; 28	RCH; 31	DAR; 18	CLT; 12	DOV; 28	POC; 28	MCH; 28	SON; 20	NHA; 21	DAY; 21	CHI; 21	IND; 23	POC; 36	GLN; 20	MCH; 43	BRI; 36		RCH; 31		DOV; 23		CAL; 26	CLT; 31	MAR; 13					30th	3128	
2009	TRG Motorsports	71	Chevy																									ATL; 18		NHA; 22		KAN; 43				TAL; 10	TEX; 31	PHO; 39	HOM; 31	30th	3128	
2010	TRG Motorsports	71	Chevy	DAY; 21	CAL; 27	LVS; 38	ATL; 22	BRI; 21	MAR; 29	PHO; 27	TEX; 23	TAL; 23	RCH; 33	DAR; 34	DOV; 39	CLT; 31	POC; 38	MCH; 41	SON; 23					POC; 28		MCH; 33		ATL; 31												31st	2583	
2010	Robby Gordon Motorsports	7	Toyota																	NHA; 30																				31st	2583	
2010	Phoenix Racing	09	Chevy																		DAY; 16	CHI; 29	IND; 31		GLN; 35		BRI; 38		RCH; 39	NHA; 39	DOV; 27	KAN; 41	CAL; 38		MAR; 43	TAL; 38		PHO; 20	HOM; 22	31st	2583	
2010	Stavola Labonte Racing	10	Chevy																															CLT; 22			TEX; 30			31st	2583	
2011	JTG Daugherty Racing	47	Toyota	DAY; 4	PHO; 21	LVS; 24	BRI; 13	CAL; 38	MAR; 27	TEX; 25	TAL; 24	RCH; 24	DAR; 18	DOV; 18	CLT; 24	KAN; 28	POC; 28	MCH; 22	SON; 38	DAY; 31	KEN; 26	NHA; 7	IND; 17	POC; 25	GLN; 19	MCH; 16	BRI; 34	ATL; 38	RCH; 20	CHI; 37	NHA; 19	DOV; 26	KAN; 30	CLT; 29	TAL; 35	MAR; 32	TEX; 28	PHO; 21	HOM; 27	29th	670	
2012	JTG Daugherty Racing	47	Toyota	DAY; 14	PHO; 16	LVS; 26	BRI; 28	CAL; 28	MAR; 17	TEX; 27	KAN; 35	RCH; 17	TAL; 21	DAR; 29	CLT; 28	DOV; 20	POC; 22	MCH; 16	SON; 24	KEN; 27	DAY; 10	NHA; 23	IND; 26	POC; 27	GLN; 19	MCH; 25	BRI; 14	ATL; 19	RCH; 25	CHI; 26	NHA; 20	DOV; 14	TAL; 18	CLT; 32	KAN; 33	MAR; 9	TEX; 33	PHO; 15	HOM; 25	23rd	772	
2013	JTG Daugherty Racing	47	Toyota	DAY; 15	PHO; 24	LVS; 30	BRI; 41	CAL; 28	MAR; 21	TEX; 42	KAN; 24	RCH; 19	TAL; 20	DAR; 26	CLT; 24	DOV; 21	POC; 27		SON; 43	KEN	DAY; 23	NHA; 27	IND; 36	POC; 19	GLN	MCH; 35	BRI; 38	ATL	RCH	CHI	NHA; 40	DOV	KAN	CLT; 28	TAL; 34	MAR; 32	TEX; 40	PHO; 22	HOM	34th	412	
2013	Phoenix Racing	51	Chevy															MCH; 43																						34th	412	
2014	HScott Motorsports	52	Chevy	DAY; 15	PHO	LVS	BRI	CAL	MAR	TEX	DAR	RCH	TAL	KAN	CLT	DOV	POC	MCH	SON	KEN																				46th	54	
2014	Hillman-Circle Sport LLC	33	Chevy																		DAY; 26	NHA																		46th	54	
2014	Tommy Baldwin Racing	37	Chevy																				IND; 37	POC	GLN	MCH	BRI	ATL	RCH	CHI	NHA	DOV	KAN	CLT	TAL	MAR	TEX	PHO	HOM	46th	54	
2015	Go Fas Racing	32	Ford	DAY; 24	ATL	LVS	PHO	CAL	MAR	TEX	BRI	RCH	TAL; 27	KAN	CLT	DOV	POC	MCH	SON	DAY; 43	KEN	NHA	IND	POC	GLN	MCH	BRI	DAR	RCH	CHI	NHA	DOV	CLT	KAN	TAL; 23	MAR	TEX	PHO	HOM	42nd	60	
2016	Go Fas Racing	32	Ford	DAY; 31	ATL	LVS	PHO	CAL	MAR	TEX	BRI	RCH	TAL; 19	KAN	DOV	CLT	POC	MCH	SON	DAY; 24	KEN	NHA	IND	POC	GLN	BRI	MCH	DAR	RCH	CHI	NHA	DOV	CLT	KAN	TAL; 31	MAR	TEX	PHO	HOM	43rd	61	

===== Daytona 500 =====
Year	Team	Manufacturer	Start	Finish
1993	Bill Davis Racing	Ford	25	20
1994	Bill Davis Racing	Pontiac	42	16
1995	Joe Gibbs Racing	Chevrolet	20	30
1996	Joe Gibbs Racing	Chevrolet	35	17
1997	Joe Gibbs Racing	Pontiac	15	21
1998	Joe Gibbs Racing	Pontiac	**1**	2
1999	Joe Gibbs Racing	Pontiac	3	25
2000	Joe Gibbs Racing	Pontiac	13	6
2001	Joe Gibbs Racing	Pontiac	37	40
2002	Joe Gibbs Racing	Pontiac	10	34
2003	Joe Gibbs Racing	Chevrolet	22	41
2004	Joe Gibbs Racing	Chevrolet	13	11
2005	Joe Gibbs Racing	Chevrolet	20	43
2006	Petty Enterprises	Dodge	8	35
2007	Petty Enterprises	Dodge	27	21
2008	Petty Enterprises	Dodge	13	11
2009	Hall of Fame Racing	Ford	12	22
2010	TRG Motorsports	Chevrolet	42	21
2011	JTG Daugherty Racing	Toyota	31	4
2012	JTG Daugherty Racing	Toyota	32	14
2013	JTG Daugherty Racing	Toyota	23	15
2014	HScott Motorsports	Chevrolet	26	15
2015	Go Fas Racing	Ford	43	24
2016	Go Fas Racing	Ford	33	31

==== Xfinity Series ====
NASCAR Xfinity Series results
Year	Team	No.	Make	1	2	3	4	5	6	7	8	9	10	11	12	13	14	15	16	17	18	19	20	21	22	23	24	25	26	27	28	29	30	31	32	33	34	35	NXSC	Pts	Ref
1982	Labonte Motorsports	44	Olds	DAY	RCH	BRI	MAR	DAR	HCY	SBO	CRW	RCH	LGY	DOV	HCY	CLT	ASH	HCY	SBO	CAR	CRW	SBO	HCY	LGY	IRP	BRI	HCY	RCH	MAR; 26	CLT	HCY	MAR							161st	85	
1985	Labonte Motorsports	81	Chevy	DAY	CAR	HCY	BRI	MAR; 30	DAR	SBO	LGY	DOV	CLT	SBO	HCY	ROU	IRP	SBO	LGY	HCY	MLW	BRI	DAR	RCH	NWS	ROU	CLT	HCY	CAR	MAR; 17									88th	73	
1988	Labonte Motorsports	88	Buick	DAY	HCY	CAR; 37	MAR	DAR; 31	BRI	LNG	NZH	SBO	NSV	CLT; 27	DOV	ROU	LAN	LVL	MYB	OXF	SBO	HCY	LNG	IRP	ROU	BRI	DAR; 16	RCH	DOV; 32	MAR	CLT; 43	CAR	MAR						53rd	298	
1989	Labonte Motorsports	44	Buick	DAY	CAR; 4	MAR	HCY	DAR; 38	BRI	NZH	SBO	LAN	NSV	CLT; 13	DOV	ROU	LVL	VOL	MYB; 31	SBO	HCY	DUB	IRP	ROU	BRI	DAR; 7	RCH	DOV	MAR	CLT; 6	CAR; 35	MAR							41st	757	
1990	Labonte Motorsports	44	Olds	DAY; 6	RCH; 3	CAR; 9	MAR; 19	HCY; 5	DAR; 2	BRI; 8	LAN; 7	SBO; 12	NZH; 19	HCY; 5	CLT; 10	**DOV**; 3	ROU; 10	VOL; 18	MYB; 10	OXF; 7	NHA; 41	SBO; 8	DUB; 12	IRP; 22	ROU; 29	**BRI**; 15	DAR; 10	RCH; 11	DOV; 37	MAR; 14	CLT; 12	NHA; 2	CAR; 16	MAR; 7					4th	3977	
1991	Labonte Motorsports	44	Olds	DAY; DNQ	RCH; 7	CAR; 6*	MAR; 4	VOL; 7	HCY; 7	DAR; 2	BRI; 1	LAN; 12	SBO; 6	NZH; 7	CLT; 8	DOV; 5	ROU; 6	HCY; 3	MYB; 21	GLN; 16	OXF; 7	NHA; 37	SBO; 11	DUB; 25	IRP; 1	ROU; 9	BRI; 2	DAR; 5	**RCH**; 16	DOV; 13	CLT; 19	NHA; 4	CAR; 8	**MAR**; 5					1st	4264	
1991	Labonte Motorsports	94	Olds	DAY; 36																																			1st	4264	
1992	Labonte Motorsports	44	Chevy	DAY; 30	CAR; 22	RCH; 3	ATL; 25	MAR; 26	DAR; 12	BRI; 6	HCY; 2	LAN; 1	DUB; 20	NZH; 2	CLT; 2	DOV; 25	ROU; 3	MYB; 2	GLN; 12	VOL; 10	NHA; 3	TAL; 10	IRP; 23	ROU; 10	MCH; 23	NHA; 6	BRI; 12	DAR; 16	RCH; 4	DOV; 2	CLT; 3	MAR; 1	CAR; 8	HCY; 1*					2nd	4272	
1993	Labonte Motorsports	14	Chevy	DAY	CAR	RCH	DAR	BRI	HCY	ROU	MAR; 2	NZH	CLT	DOV	MYB	GLN	MLW	TAL	IRP	MCH	NHA	BRI	DAR	RCH	DOV	ROU	CLT	MAR	CAR	**HCY**; 24*	ATL								60th	261	
1994	Wegner Racing	33	Pontiac	DAY; 30	CAR	RCH	ATL; 13	MAR	DAR	HCY	BRI	ROU	**NHA**; 35	NZH	CLT; 35	DOV	MYB	GLN; 26	MLW; 4	SBO	TAL; 40	HCY	IRP		BRI; 13	DAR	RCH; 10	DOV; 25											35th	1188	
1994	Wegner Racing	33	Chevy																					MCH; 1					CLT; 34	MAR	CAR								35th	1188	
1996	Labonte Motorsports	44	Chevy	DAY; 9	CAR; 5	RCH; 17	ATL; 9	NSV; 1	DAR; 5	BRI	HCY	NZH	CLT; 3	**DOV**; 15*	SBO	MYB	GLN; 4	MLW; 5	NHA; 5	TAL; 16	IRP	MCH; 6	BRI	DAR	RCH; 9	DOV	**CLT**; 2	CAR	**HOM**; 2										19th	2374	
1997	Labonte Motorsports	44	Pontiac	DAY	CAR; 41	RCH; 10	ATL; 3	LVS; 12	DAR	HCY	TEX; 28	BRI	NSV	TAL	NHA	NZH	CLT; 30	DOV; 1*	SBO	GLN; 7	MLW; 18	MYB	GTY; 20	IRP	MCH; 3	BRI; 6	DAR; 4	RCH	DOV; 31		CAL; 30*	CAR	HOM						27th	1912	
1997	Joe Gibbs Racing	18	Pontiac																											CLT; 9									27th	1912	
1998	Joe Gibbs Racing	44	Pontiac	DAY	CAR	LVS	NSV	DAR; 1	BRI	TEX	HCY	TAL	NHA	NZH	**CLT**; 6	DOV	RCH; 42	PPR	GLN	MLW	MYB	CAL	SBO	IRP	MCH; 2	BRI	DAR	RCH	DOV; 34	CLT	GTY	CAR	ATL	HOM					54th	608	
1999	Labonte Motorsports	44	Chevy	DAY	CAR; DNQ																																		101st	115	
1999	Joe Gibbs Racing	18	Pontiac			LVS; 16	ATL	DAR; DNQ	TEX	NSV	BRI	TAL	CAL	NHA	RCH	NZH	CLT	DOV	SBO	GLN	MLW	MYB	PPR	GTY	IRP	MCH	BRI	DAR	RCH	DOV	CLT	CAR	MEM	PHO	HOM				101st	115	
2004	Richard Childress Racing	29	Chevy	DAY	CAR	LVS	DAR	BRI	TEX; 11	NSH	TAL	CAL	GTY	RCH	NZH	CLT	DOV	NSH	KEN	MLW	DAY	CHI	NHA	PPR	IRP														68th	402	
2004	Joe Gibbs Racing	19	Chevy																							MCH; DNQ	BRI												68th	402	
2004	Joe Gibbs Racing	18	Chevy																									CAL; 7	RCH	DOV	KAN	CLT; 14	MEM	ATL	PHO	DAR	HOM		68th	402	
2005	Joe Gibbs Racing	19	Chevy	DAY	CAL	MXC	LVS	ATL	NSH	BRI	TEX	PHO	TAL	DAR	RCH	CLT; 6	DOV	NSH	KEN	MLW	DAY	CHI; 16	NHA	PPR	GTY	IRP	GLN	MCH; 7	BRI; 10	CAL	RCH; 8	DOV	KAN; 37	CLT	MEM	TEX; 12	PHO; DNQ	HOM	55th	866	
2006	Brewco Motorsports	66	Ford	DAY	CAL	MXC	LVS	ATL	BRI	TEX	NSH	PHO	TAL	RCH	DAR	CLT	DOV	NSH	KEN	MLW	DAY	CHI; 12	NHA	MAR	GTY	IRP	GLN	MCH; 15	BRI	CAL	RCH	DOV							54th	755	
2006	Kevin Harvick, Inc.	77	Chevy																														KAN; 9	CLT; 22	MEM	TEX; 9	PHO; 34	HOM; 29	54th	755	
2007	Kevin Harvick, Inc.	77	Chevy	DAY; 18	CAL	MXC	LVS; 8	ATL; 42	BRI; 11	NSH	TEX; 22	PHO	TAL; 1	RCH	DAR; 34	CLT; 22	DOV	NSH	KEN	MLW	NHA; 29	DAY; 23	CHI; 16	GTY	IRP	CGV	GLN; 7	MCH; 18	BRI; 27	CAL	RCH; 17	DOV; 11	KAN	CLT; 14	MEM	TEX; 29	PHO	HOM; 43	28th	1963	
2008	Richard Childress Racing	21	Chevy	DAY; 15	CAL	LVS; 34	ATL; 5	BRI; 29	NSH	TEX; 4	PHO	MXC	TAL	RCH	DAR	CLT	DOV	NSH	KEN	MLW	NHA	DAY	CHI	GTY	IRP	CGV	GLN	MCH	BRI	CAL	RCH	DOV	KAN	CLT	MEM	TEX	PHO	HOM	61st	575	
2016	Joe Gibbs Racing	18	Toyota	DAY; 23	ATL	LVS	PHO	CAL	TEX	BRI	RCH	TAL	DOV	CLT	POC	MCH	IOW	DAY	KEN	NHA	IND	IOW	GLN	MOH	BRI	ROA	DAR	RCH	CHI	KEN	DOV	CLT	KAN	TEX	PHO	HOM			118th	0^{1}	

==== Craftsman Truck Series ====
NASCAR Craftsman Truck Series results
Year	Team	No.	Make	1	2	3	4	5	6	7	8	9	10	11	12	13	14	15	16	17	18	19	20	21	22	23	24	25	NCTC	Pts	Ref
1996	Doran Racing	77	Chevy	HOM	PHO	POR	EVG	TUS	CNS	HPT	BRI	NZH	MLW	LVL	I70	IRP	FLM	GLN	NSV	RCH	NHA	MAR	NWS	SON	MMR	PHO; 34	LVS		126th	61	
2004	Morgan-Dollar Motorsports	47	Chevy	DAY	ATL	MAR	MFD	CLT	DOV	TEX	MEM	MLW	KAN	KEN	GTW	MCH	IRP	NSH	BRI	RCH	NHA	LVS	CAL	TEX	MAR; 3	PHO	DAR	HOM; 29	59th	246	
2005	Morgan-Dollar Motorsports	47	Chevy	DAY	CAL	ATL; 2	MAR; 1	GTY	MFD	CLT	DOV	TEX	MCH; 32	MLW	KAN	KEN	MEM	IRP	NSH	BRI	RCH	NHA	LVS		ATL; 5	TEX	PHO	HOM	36th	679	
2005	Xpress Motorsports	16	Chevy																					MAR; 22					36th	679	
2006	Bobby Hamilton Racing	4	Dodge	DAY	CAL	ATL	MAR	GTY	CLT	MFD	DOV	TEX	MCH; 3	MLW	KAN	KEN	MEM	IRP	NSH	BRI	NHA	LVS	TAL	MAR	ATL	TEX	PHO	HOM	64th	170	
2007	Bobby Hamilton Racing	4	Dodge	DAY	CAL	ATL	MAR	KAN	CLT	MFD	DOV	TEX	MCH; 18	MLW	MEM	KEN	IRP	NSH	BRI	GTW	NHA	LVS	TAL	MAR	ATL	TEX	PHO	HOM	87th	109	

==== Whelen Modified Tour ====
NASCAR Whelen Modified Tour results
Year	Car owner	No.	Make	1	2	3	4	5	6	7	8	9	10	11	12	13	14	15	16	17	18	NWMTC	Pts	Ref
2021	Michael Smith	25	Chevy	MAR; Wth	STA	RIV	JEN	OSW	RIV	NHA	NRP	STA	BEE	OSW	RCH	RIV	STA					N/A	0	
2022	Philip Stefanelli	17	Chevy	NSM	RCH	RIV	LEE	JEN	MND	RIV	WAL	NHA	CLM	TMP	LGY	OSW	RIV	TMP	MAR; 33			67th	11	
2023	Philip Stefanelli	38	Chevy	NSM	RCH; 6	MON	RIV	LEE	SEE	RIV	WAL	NHA	LMP	THO	LGY	OSW	MON	RIV	NWS; 33	THO		41st	83	
2023	Philip Stefanelli	7	Chevy																		MAR; 10	41st	83	
2024	Philip Stefanelli	38	Chevy	NSM	RCH; 23	THO	MON	RIV	SEE	NHA	MON	LMP	THO	OSW	RIV	MON	THO	NWS; 8	MAR; 8			40th	93	
2025	Philip Stefanelli	38	Chevy	NSM	THO	NWS; 29	SEE	RIV	WMM	LMP	MON	MON	THO	RCH	OSW	NHA	RIV	THO	MAR; 28			57th	31	
2026	Philip Stefanelli	38	Chevy	NSM; 31	MAR	THO	SEE	RIV	OXF	SEE	CLM	WMM	MON	THO	NHA	STA	OSW	RIV	THO			60th	13	

==== Whelen Euro Series – Elite 1 ====
NASCAR Whelen Euro Series - Elite 1 results
Year	Team	No.	Make	1	2	3	4	5	6	7	8	9	10	11	12	13	NWESC	Pts	Ref
2017	Alex Caffi Motorsport	1	Ford	VAL	VAL	BRH; 14	BRH; 10	VEN	VEN	HOC	HOC	FRA	FRA	ZOL	ZOL		32nd	64	
2018	RDV Competition	18	Toyota	VAL; 14	VAL; 8	FRA; 21	FRA; 13	BRH; 10	BRH; 24	TOU; 20	TOU; 2	HOC; 8	HOC; 21	ZOL; 20	ZOL; 26		14th	335	
2019	Mishumotors	70	Chevy	VAL; 18	VAL; 14	FRA	FRA	BRH	BRH	MOS	MOS	VEN	HOC	HOC	ZOL	ZOL	39th	42	

=== SMART Modified Tour ===
SMART Modified Tour results
Year	Car owner	No.	Make	1	2	3	4	5	6	7	8	9	10	11	12	13	14	SMTC	Pts	Ref
2021	Michael Smith	25	N/A	CRW; 9	FLO; 2	SBO; 17	FCS; 7	CRW	DIL; 1	CAR; 1*	CRW; 2	DOM; 13	PUL; 6	HCY; 2	ACE			4th	267	
2022	Michael Smith	25	N/A	FLO; 6	SNM; 5	CRW; 3	SBO; 4	FCS; 5	CRW; 13	NWS; 17	NWS; 3	CAR; 11*	DOM; 4	HCY; 4	TRI; 4	PUL; 4		3rd	309	
2023	Philip Stefanelli	18VA	PSR	FLO; 9	CRW; 11		HCY; 7	FCS; 4	CRW; 6	ACE; 6	CAR; 4			SBO; 6				4th	412	
2023	Philip Stefanelli	18	PSR			SBO; 21							TRI; 1					4th	412	
2023	Philip Stefanelli	18V	PSR									PUL; 18						4th	412	
2023	Philip Stefanelli	18L	PSR												ROU; 1			4th	412	
2024	Philip Stefanelli	18L	N/A	FLO	CRW; 3	SBO	TRI	ROU	HCY	FCS								21st	186	
2024	Philip Stefanelli	18VA	N/A								CRW; 1	JAC	CAR; 9	CRW			NWS; 6	21st	186	
2024	Philip Stefanelli	18	N/A												DOM; 11	SBO		21st	186	
2025	Philip Stefanelli	38	N/A	FLO	AND	SBO	ROU	HCY	FCS	CRW	CPS	CAR	CRW	DOM	FCS	TRI	NWS; 6	41st	36	
2026	Sadler-Stanley Racing	16VA	N/A	FLO	AND	SBO	DOM	HCY	WKS	FCR	CRW; 13	PUL	CAR; Wth	ROU	TRI	NWS		51st	28	

^{*} Season still in progress
^{1} Ineligible for series points

=== International Race of Champions ===
(key) (Bold – Pole position. * – Most laps led.)

International Race of Champions results
Year	Make	1	2	3	4	Pos.	Pts	Ref
1997	Pontiac	DAY	CLT	CAL; 2*	MCH	NA	0	
1999	Pontiac	DAY; 2	TAL; 8	MCH; 4	IND; 4	3rd	53	
2000	Pontiac	DAY; 7	TAL; 1*	MCH; 6	IND; 6	4th	52	
2001	Pontiac	DAY; 5	TAL; 1	MCH; 5	IND; 1	1st	68	
2002	Pontiac	DAY; 7	CAL; 2	CHI; 8	IND; 9	5th	43	

=== 24 Hours of Daytona ===
(key)

24 Hours of Daytona results
Year	Class	No	Team	Car	Co-drivers	Laps	Position	Class Pos.
2005	DP	44	(United States) Doran Racing	Pontiac Doran DP	(Denmark) Jan Magnussen (United States) Bryan Herta (United States) Terry Labonte	675	9 ^{DNF}	9 ^{DNF}
2006	DP	09	(United States) Spirit of Daytona Racing	Pontiac Crawford DP	(United States) Doug Goad (France) Harold Primat (United States) Larry Oberto	572	35 ^{DNF}	17 ^{DNF}
2007	DP	19	(United States) Finlay Motorsports	Ford Crawford DP	(United States) Rob Finlay (Canada) Michael Valiante (United States) Michael McDowell	627	10 ^{DNF}	10 ^{DNF}
2010	GT	71	(United States) The Racer's Group	Porsche GT3 Cup	(United States) Tim George Jr. (United States) Spencer Pumpelly (Germany) Timo Bernhard (France) Romain Dumas	668	16	9

=== Superstar Racing Experience ===
(key) * – Most laps led. ^{1} – Heat 1 winner. ^{2} – Heat 2 winner.

Superstar Racing Experience results
Year	No.	1	2	3	4	5	6	SRXC	Pts
2021	18	STA; 5	KNX; 6	ELD; 11	IRP; 2	SLG; 5	NSV; 4	3rd	182
2022	18	FIF; 5	SBO; 3	STA; 5^{2}	NSV; 1*	I55; 11	SHA; 5	3rd	190
2023	18	STA; 8	STA II; 6	MMS; 7	BER; 9	ELD; 4	LOS; 12^{2}	6th	145

^{*} Season still in progress

Sporting positions
Preceded by Dale Jarrett	NASCAR Winston Cup Series Champion; 2000	Succeeded by Jeff Gordon
Preceded by Chuck Bown	NASCAR Busch Series Champion; 1991	Succeeded by Joe Nemechek
Preceded by Dale Earnhardt	IROC Champion; IROC XXV (2001)	Succeeded by Kevin Harvick
Achievements
Preceded by Jeff Gordon	Coca-Cola 600 winner 1995	Succeeded by Dale Jarrett
Preceded by Dale Jarrett	Brickyard 400; 2000	Succeeded by Jeff Gordon
Preceded by Jeff Burton	Southern 500 Winner; 2000	Succeeded by Ward Burton
