= Justin Labonte =

American racing driver (born 1981)

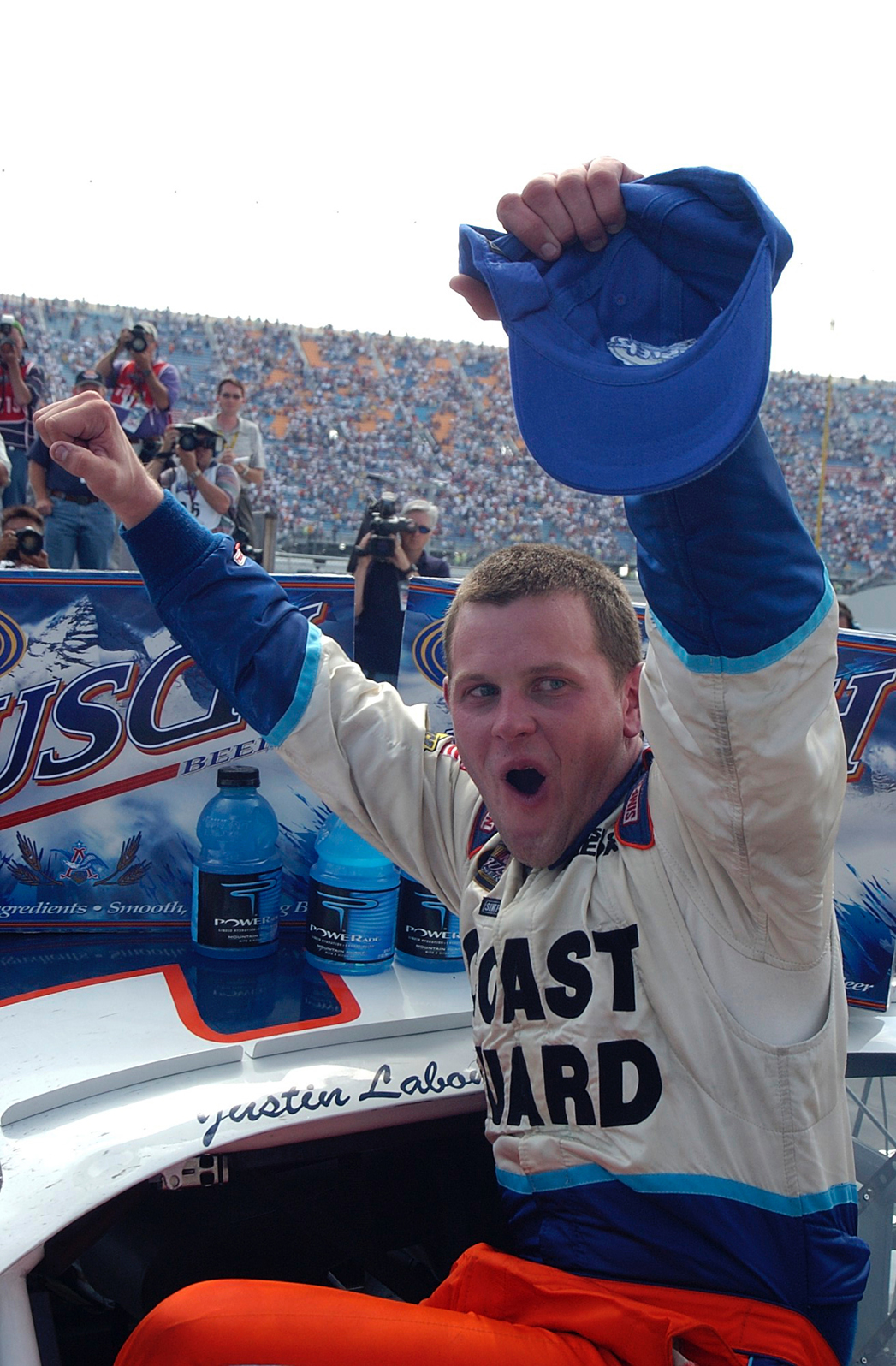
- Labonte celebrates his 2004 Twister 300 win
- Born: February 5, 1981 (age 45); Trinity, North Carolina, U.S.
- Achievements: 1996 Summer Shootout Series Champion at Charlotte; 1997 Summer Shootout Series Champion at Charlotte; 2003 Late Model Stock Champion at Caraway Speedway
- Awards: 1998 USAR Hooters Pro Cup Consistency Award

NASCAR O'Reilly Auto Parts Series career
- 76 races run over 6 years
- 2006 position: 80th
- Best finish: 17th (2005)
- First race: 1999 BellSouth Mobility 320 (Nashville)
- Last race: 2006 Sam's Town 250 (Memphis)
- First win: 2004 Twister 300 (Chicago)
| Wins | Top tens | Poles |
|---|---|---|
| 1 | 3 | 0 |

NASCAR FedEx Freight Truck Series career
- 3 races run over 2 years
- First race: 2006 Silverado 350K (Texas)
- Last race: 2007 Kroger 200 (Martinsville)
| Wins | Top tens | Poles |
|---|---|---|
| 0 | 0 | 0 |
- Statistics up to date as of November 26, 2006.

Justin Labonte (born February 5, 1981) is an American former NASCAR Busch Series driver. He is the son of two-time Winston Cup Series champion Terry Labonte, and the nephew of 2000 champion Bobby Labonte. He currently races on short tracks in North Carolina.

== Racing career ==
=== Pre-NASCAR ===
Labonte was born in Trinity, North Carolina. He began racing at the age of fifteen at Ace Speedway and Concord Motorsport Park. He also ran the Legends Summer Shootout Series at Charlotte Motor Speedway, where he won back-to-back championships in 1996 and 1997. During those two years, he split 25 career victories at Ace and Concord. In 1998, he moved to the USAR Hooters Pro Cup Series, where he finished third in points and posted thirteen top-tens. He also won the Consistency award for finishing nearly 97% of all possible laps during the season. The next season, he had three top-tens in seven starts.

=== NASCAR ===
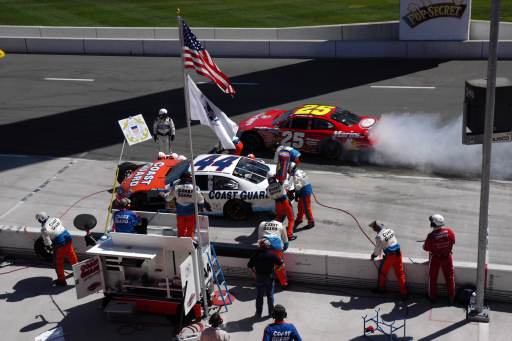
Labonte (No. 44) pits during the 2004 Fontana race

In 1999, Labonte began sharing the No. 44 Chevrolet Monte Carlo with his father in the Busch Series. Qualifying nine times, he had a best finish of fourteenth at Myrtle Beach Speedway. He ran more races in 2000, his best finish a 20th at Nashville Speedway USA. He also made three starts in the ARCA series, posting two top-five finishes. In 2001, he ran a limited ARCA schedule, making five starts, including a race at Nashville Superspeedway, where he led 70 laps.

Labonte began running late model stock series in 2002 at Caraway Speedway. In his first season at the track, he won one feature event and had ten top-tens in twelve starts. He followed that up by winning the track championship the next season. Labonte also returned to the Busch Series in 2002, attempting but failing to qualify for three races in the No. 04 Dodge for Cunningham Motorsports. He made his first start in three years in 2003, starting 23rd and finishing 29th at Michigan International Speedway in the No. 06 Dodge Intrepid for Cunningham Motorsports.

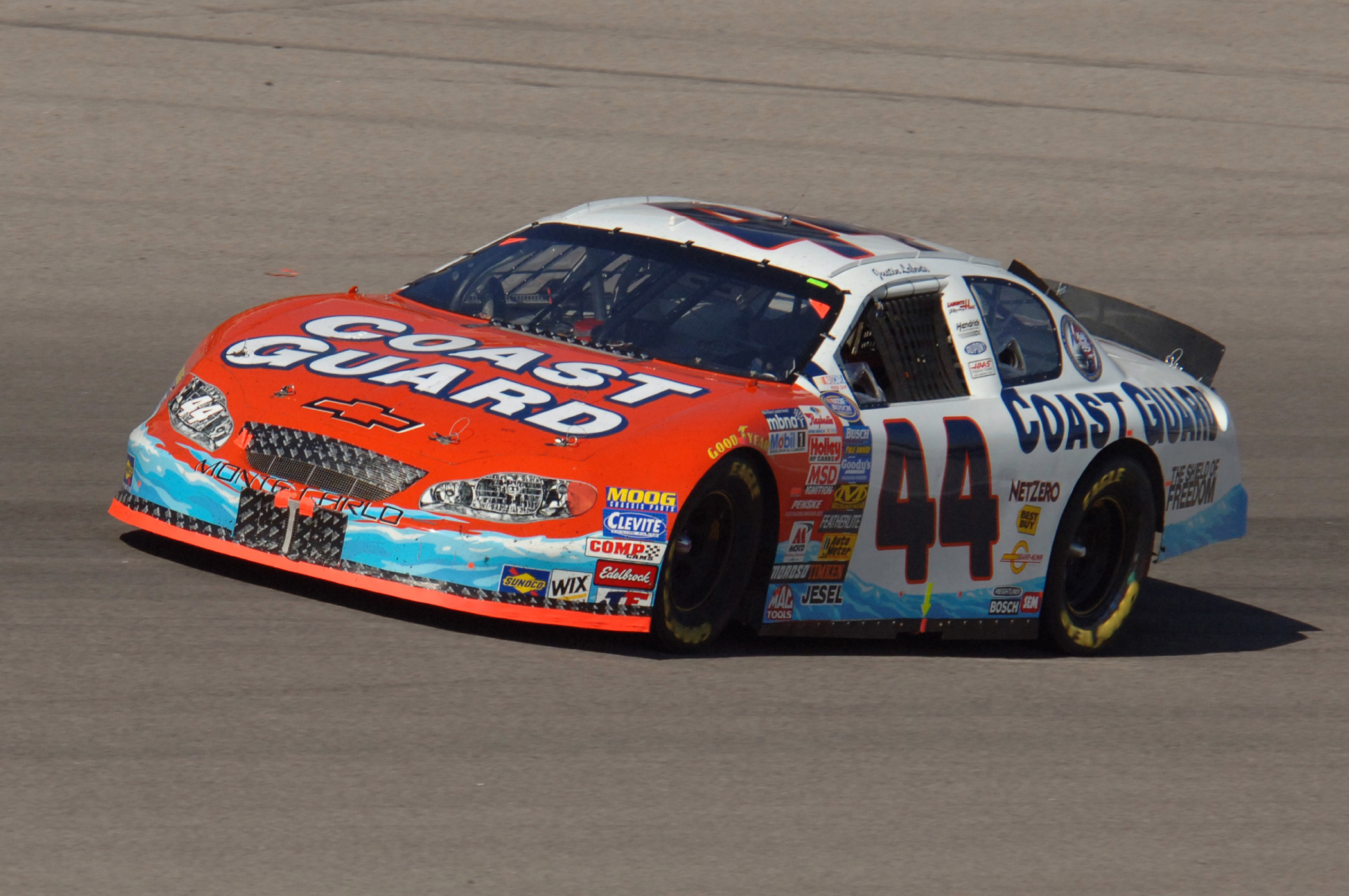
Labonte competing at Texas in 2005.

In 2004, Labonte announced he would make a limited run in the Busch Series that season in the No. 44 car owned by his father and sponsored by the United States Coast Guard. At the Twister 300, Labonte passed Mike Wallace on the last lap, after Wallace ran out of gas, to win his first career race. Out of seventeen starts that season, it was his only top-ten, but finished 35th in points. For 2005, Labonte's team merged with Haas CNC Racing, and he posted two top-tens and finished seventeenth in points. At the end of the season, he was released from his contract. He ran his only Busch race of 2006 at Memphis Motorsports Park in the No. 5 for Hendrick Motorsports, finishing 22nd. He also made his Craftsman Truck Series debut at Texas Motor Speedway, driving the No. 24 Bill Davis Racing Toyota Tundra to a 22nd finish place finish. He most recently raced in the Craftsman Truck Series in 2007 driving Michael Waltrip's No. 00 Toyota Tundra. He finished 27th at O'Reilly Raceway Park, followed by a twelfth-place finish at Martinsville.

== Motorsports career results ==
=== NASCAR ===
(key) (Bold – Pole position awarded by qualifying time. Italics – Pole position earned by points standings or practice time. * – Most laps led.)

==== Busch Series ====
NASCAR Busch Series results
| Year | Team | No. | Make | 1 | 2 | 3 | 4 | 5 | 6 | 7 | 8 | 9 | 10 | 11 | 12 | 13 | 14 | 15 | 16 | 17 | 18 | 19 | 20 | 21 | 22 | 23 | 24 | 25 | 26 | 27 | 28 | 29 | 30 | 31 | 32 | 33 | 34 | 35 | NBSC | Pts | Ref |
|---|---|---|---|---|---|---|---|---|---|---|---|---|---|---|---|---|---|---|---|---|---|---|---|---|---|---|---|---|---|---|---|---|---|---|---|---|---|---|---|---|---|
| 1999 | Labonte Motorsports | 44 | Chevy | DAY | CAR | LVS | ATL | DAR | TEX | NSV; 41 | BRI | TAL | CAL | NHA | RCH | NZH | CLT | DOV | SBO; 30 | GLN | MLW; 33 | MYB; 14 | PPR | GTY; 26 | IRP; 25 | MCH | BRI | DAR | RCH; 23 | DOV | CLT | CAR; 34 | MEM; 40 | PHO | HOM | | | | 58th | 669 | |
| 2000 | Labonte Motorsports | 44 | Chevy | DAY | CAR; 28 | LVS | ATL | DAR | BRI | TEX | NSV; 20 | TAL | CAL | RCH; 27 | NHA; 23 | CLT; DNQ | DOV | SBO; 31 | MYB; 33 | GLN; 33 | MLW; 37 | NZH; 22 | PPR; 36 | GTY; 40 | IRP; DNQ | MCH | BRI; DNQ | DAR; DNQ | RCH; DNQ | DOV; DNQ | CLT; DNQ | CAR; 33 | MEM; 39 | PHO; DNQ | HOM; DNQ | | | | 48th | 913 | |
| 2002 | Cunningham Motorsports | 04 | Dodge | DAY | CAR | LVS | DAR | BRI | TEX | NSH | TAL | CAL | RCH | NHA | NZH | CLT | DOV | NSH | KEN | MLW | DAY | CHI | GTY | PPR | IRP | MCH | BRI | DAR | RCH | DOV | KAN | CLT; DNQ | MEM | ATL; DNQ | CAR; DNQ | PHO | HOM | | NA | - | |
| 2003 | Cunningham Motorsports | 06 | Dodge | DAY | CAR | LVS | DAR | BRI | TEX | TAL | NSH | CAL | RCH | GTY | NZH | CLT | DOV | NSH | KEN | MLW | DAY | CHI | NHA | PPR | IRP | MCH; 29 | BRI | DAR | RCH | DOV | KAN | CLT | MEM | ATL | PHO | CAR | HOM | | 134th | 76 | |
| 2004 | Labonte Motorsports | 44 | Dodge | DAY | CAR | LVS | DAR | BRI | TEX; 29 | NSH | TAL | CAL; 41 | GTY | RCH; 22 | NZH | CLT; 18 | DOV; 31 | NSH | KEN; 30 | MLW | DAY; 33 | CHI; 1 | NHA; 19 | PPR | IRP | MCH; 14 | BRI | CAL; 28 | RCH; DNQ | DOV; 30 | KAN | CLT; 18 | MEM | ATL; 37 | PHO; 37 | | | | 35th | 1415 | |
| 2004 | Haas CNC Racing | 00 | Chevy | | | | | | | | | | | | | | | | | | | | | | | | | | | | | | | | | DAR; 19 | | | 35th | 1415 | |
| 2004 | Haas CNC Racing | 44 | Chevy | | | | | | | | | | | | | | | | | | | | | | | | | | | | | | | | | | HOM; 17 | | 35th | 1415 | |
| 2005 | Labonte-Haas Motorsports | 44 | Chevy | DAY; 18 | CAL; 19 | MXC; 25 | LVS; 13 | ATL; 42 | NSH; 13 | BRI; 40 | TEX; 33 | PHO; 20 | TAL; 7 | DAR; 18 | RCH; 32 | CLT; 22 | DOV; 23 | NSH; 29 | KEN; 11 | MLW; 16 | DAY; 34 | CHI; 41 | NHA; 41 | PPR; 13 | GTY; 13 | IRP; 22 | GLN; 16 | MCH; 17 | BRI; 23 | CAL; 36 | RCH; 22 | DOV; 26 | KAN; 25 | CLT; 10 | MEM; 12 | TEX; 24 | PHO; 22 | HOM; 21 | 17th | 3285 | |
| 2006 | Hendrick Motorsports | 5 | Chevy | DAY | CAL | MXC | LVS | ATL | BRI | TEX | NSH | PHO | TAL | RCH | DAR | CLT | DOV | NSH | KEN | MLW | DAY | CHI | NHA | MAR | GTY | IRP | GLN | MCH | BRI | CAL | RCH | DOV | KAN | CLT | MEM; 22 | TEX | PHO | HOM | 115th | 97 | |

==== Craftsman Truck Series ====
NASCAR Craftsman Truck Series results
| Year | Team | No. | Make | 1 | 2 | 3 | 4 | 5 | 6 | 7 | 8 | 9 | 10 | 11 | 12 | 13 | 14 | 15 | 16 | 17 | 18 | 19 | 20 | 21 | 22 | 23 | 24 | 25 | NCTC | Pts | Ref |
|---|---|---|---|---|---|---|---|---|---|---|---|---|---|---|---|---|---|---|---|---|---|---|---|---|---|---|---|---|---|---|---|
| 2006 | Bill Davis Racing | 24 | Toyota | DAY | CAL | ATL | MAR | GTY | CLT | MFD | DOV | TEX | MCH | MLW | KAN | KEN | MEM | IRP | NSH | BRI | NHA | LVS | TAL | MAR | ATL | TEX; 23 | PHO | HOM | 79th | 94 | |
| 2007 | Darrell Waltrip Motorsports | 00 | Toyota | DAY | CAL | ATL | MAR | KAN | CLT | MFD | DOV | TEX | MCH | MLW | MEM | KEN | IRP; 27 | NSH | BRI | GTW | NHA | LVS | TAL | MAR; 12 | ATL | TEX | PHO | HOM | 72nd | 209 | |

=== ARCA Re/Max Series ===
(key) (Bold – Pole position awarded by qualifying time. Italics – Pole position earned by points standings or practice time. * – Most laps led.)

ARCA Re/Max Series results
| Year | Team | No. | Make | 1 | 2 | 3 | 4 | 5 | 6 | 7 | 8 | 9 | 10 | 11 | 12 | 13 | 14 | 15 | 16 | 17 | 18 | 19 | 20 | 21 | 22 | 23 | 24 | 25 | ARSC | Pts | Ref |
|---|---|---|---|---|---|---|---|---|---|---|---|---|---|---|---|---|---|---|---|---|---|---|---|---|---|---|---|---|---|---|---|
| 2000 | Labonte Motorsports | 08 | Chevy | DAY | SLM | AND | CLT; 4 | KIL | FRS | MCH | POC | TOL | KEN | BLN | POC | WIN | ISF | KEN | DSF | SLM | CLT; 20 | TAL | ATL; 2 | | | | | | 48th | 560 | |
| 2001 | Labonte Motorsports | 44 | Chevy | DAY; 34 | NSH | WIN | SLM | GTY | KEN | | | | | | | | | | | | | | | | | | | | 61st | 595 | |
| 2001 | Cunningham Motorsports | 4 | Chevy | | | | | | | CLT; 30 | KAN | MCH | POC | MEM | GLN | KEN | MCH | POC | | | | | | | | | | ATL; 29 | 61st | 595 | |
| 2001 | Cunningham Motorsports | 4 | Dodge | | | | | | | | | | | | | | | | NSH; 14 | ISF | CHI; DNQ | DSF | SLM | TOL | BLN | CLT | TAL; 17 | | 61st | 595 | |
| 2002 | Cunningham Motorsports | 4 | Dodge | DAY; 9 | | | | | | | | | | | | | | | | | | | | | | | | | 83rd | 355 | |
| 2002 | Cunningham Motorsports | 4 | Chevy | | ATL; 28 | NSH | SLM | KEN | CLT; 32 | KAN | POC | MCH | TOL | SBO | KEN | BLN | POC | NSH | ISF | WIN | DSF | CHI | SLM | TAL | CLT | | | | 83rd | 355 | |
