= Labonte Motorsports =

Former NASCAR team

- Owner(s): Bob Labonte, Bobby Labonte, Terry Labonte, Justin Labonte
- Base: Charlotte, North Carolina
- Series: Winston Cup, Busch Series
- Manufacturer: Chevrolet, Oldsmobile, Buick, Pontiac, Dodge
- Opened: 1982
- Closed: 2004

Career
- Drivers' Championships: 2
- Race victories: 21

Labonte Motorsports is a former part-time Winston Cup team and full-time Busch Series team. It was owned by the Labonte racing family from Corpus Christi, Texas and competed for several years under various incarnations.

== 1980s ==
Labonte Motorsports debuted in 1982 at Martinsville Speedway in the No. 44 Oldsmobile, when it was owned Bob Labonte. Bobby Labonte drove the car, starting fifteenth and finishing 26th after dropping out 30 laps into the race. They did not run a race until 1985, when Bobby drove two races in the No. 81 at Martinsville, his best finish being seventeenth in the fall race. In 1986, Terry Labonte drove two races, winning the pole at Road Atlanta and finished second at the same race. Bobby returned to run six races in the No. 88 Winner's Circle Auto Parts Buick, but wrecked out of three of them. In 1989, he switched back to the No. 44 and had first three top-tens, including a fourth-place finish at Rockingham Speedway.

== 1990s ==
Labonte ran his first full season 1990, with sponsorship from Penrose Firecracker. Although he went winless, he had seventeen top-tens and finished fourth in the final standings. In 1991, he won two races and the Busch Series championship. That same season, Labonte Motorsports, ran five races at the Winston Cup level. Bobby ran two races for Bob, first in the 14, and then the 44, dropping out of both races with engine failure. Irv Hoerr then ran three races for Terry in the 44, his best finish being 19th at Pocono Raceway. Terry also began fielding his own entries in Busch, driving five races in the No. 94 Sunoco Oldsmobile and picking up a win at Watkins Glen International. In 1992, Labonte won three races but lost the championship by three points. Terry failed to win a race, but switched to the No. 14 after picking up sponsorship from MW Windows.

Bobby moved up to Cup in 1993, and was replaced by Labonte Motorsports mechanic David Green with Slim Jim becoming the team's new sponsor. Although he failed to win in his first season with the team, he had six top-fives and finished third in points. The No. 14 was shared by Bobby and Terry, who together won two pole positions. In 1994, Green won one race but also claimed the Busch Series championship. Terry had four wins out of twenty starts, and Bobby debuted the new No. 33 Dentyne Pontiac, winning at Michigan International Speedway. Green had another win in 1995, but fell to twelfth in the standings. Terry had one win and finished eighteenth in points.

In 1996, Bob retired from racing and Bobby became the new listed owner of the 44. With Shell Oil sponsoring, Bobby ran sixteen races and won at Nashville Speedway USA. Terry changed his number to 5 and picked up funding from Bayer/Actron, and won three races that season. Bobby Hamilton ran the season finale at Homestead, finishing 24th. He drove fourteen times in 1997, but failed to win a race. Andy Hillenburg and Brad Leighton drove in one-race deals for him, but they failed to finish in the top-ten. Bobby drove fifteen times in 1998, and had another win, along with sharing the ride with Tony Stewart for five races, who had two top-tens. At the end of the season, Bobby sold his team to this employer, Joe Gibbs Racing.

== 2000s ==
After taking 1998 off, Labonte Motorsports returned in 1999, with Terry owning and driving the No. 44 Slim Jim Chevrolet. He won his final career Busch race at Talladega Superspeedway, and had three top-fives. Jack Sprague and Steve Grissom drove one race deals for him, and Terry's son Justin began racing, making nine starts that season with a best finish of fourteenth at Myrtle Beach Speedway. Labonte and Glenn Allen Jr. shared the ride to begin the 2000 season, before Justin finished it out. His best finish was 20th at Nashville.

Labonte Motorsports was inactive until Justin began running a part-time schedule in 2004. Driving the No. 44 United States Coast Guard Dodge Intrepid, he made sixteen starts and won the Twister 300 at Chicagoland Speedway. The team partnered with Haas CNC Racing in 2005 to allow Justin to run a full-time schedule in the 44 Chevy. Despite three top-tens and a seventeenth-place finish in points, Coast Guard departed for Richard Childress Racing at the end of the season, causing the team to close its doors again.

== Motorsports results ==
=== Busch Series ===
==== Car No. 44 results ====
Year	Driver	No.	Make	1	2	3	4	5	6	7	8	9	10	11	12	13	14	15	16	17	18	19	20	21	22	23	24	25	26	27	28	29	30	31	32	33	34	Owners	Pts
1982	Bobby Labonte	44	Olds	DAY	RCH	BRI	MAR	DAR	HCY	SBO	CRW	RCH	LGY	DOV	HCY	CLT	ASH	HCY	SBO	CAR	CRW	SBO	HCY	LGY	IRP	BRI	HCY	RCH	MAR; 26	CLT	HCY	MAR							
1985	Bobby Labonte	81	Chevy	DAY	CAR	HCY	BRI	MAR; 30	DAR	SBO	LGY	DOV	CLT	SBO	HCY	ROU	IRP	SBO	LGY	HCY	MLW	BRI	DAR	RCH	NWS	ROU	CLT	HCY	CAR	MAR; 17									
1986	Terry Labonte	44	Olds	DAY	CAR	HCY	MAR	BRI	DAR	SBO	LGY	JFC	DOV	CLT	SBO	HCY	ROU	IRP	SBO	RAL; 2																			
1986	Terry Labonte	44	Buick																		OXF; 41	SBO	HCY	LGY	ROU	BRI	DAR	RCH	DOV	MAR	ROU	CLT	CAR	MAR					
1988	Bobby Labonte	88	Buick	DAY	HCY	CAR; 37	MAR	DAR; 31	BRI	LNG	NZH	SBO	NSV	CLT; 27	DOV	ROU	LAN	LVL	MYB	OXF	SBO	HCY	LNG	IRP	ROU	BRI	DAR; 16	RCH	DOV; 32	MAR	CLT; 43	CAR	MAR						
1989	Bobby Labonte	44	Buick	DAY	CAR; 4	MAR	HCY	DAR; 38	BRI	NZH	SBO	LAN	NSV	CLT; 13	DOV	ROU	LVL	VOL	MYB; 31	SBO	HCY	DUB	IRP	ROU	BRI	DAR; 7	RCH	DOV	MAR	CLT; 6	CAR; 35	MAR							
1990	Bobby Labonte	44	Olds	DAY; 6	RCH; 3	CAR; 9	MAR; 19	HCY; 5	DAR; 2	BRI; 8	LAN; 7	SBO; 12	NZH; 19	HCY; 5	CLT; 10	DOV; 3	ROU; 10	VOL; 18	MYB; 10	OXF; 7	NHA; 41	SBO; 8	DUB; 12	IRP; 22	ROU; 29	BRI; 15	DAR; 10	RCH; 11	DOV; 37	MAR; 14	CLT; 12	NHA; 2	CAR; 16	MAR; 7					
1991	Bobby Labonte	44	Olds	DAY; DNQ	RCH; 7	CAR; 6*	MAR; 4	VOL; 7	HCY; 7	DAR; 2	BRI; 1	LAN; 12	SBO; 6	NZH; 7	CLT; 8	DOV; 5	ROU; 6	HCY; 3	MYB; 21	GLN; 16	OXF; 7	NHA; 37	SBO; 11	DUB; 25	IRP; 1	ROU; 9	BRI; 2	DAR; 5	RCH; 16	DOV; 13	CLT; 19	NHA; 4	CAR; 8	MAR; 5					
1992	Bobby Labonte	44	Chevy	DAY; 30	CAR; 22	RCH; 3	ATL; 25	MAR; 26	DAR; 12	BRI; 6	HCY; 2	LAN; 1	DUB; 20	NZH; 2	CLT; 2	DOV; 25	ROU; 3	MYB; 2	GLN; 12	VOL; 10	NHA; 3	TAL; 10	IRP; 23	ROU; 10	MCH; 23	NHA; 6	BRI; 12	DAR; 16	RCH; 4	DOV; 2	CLT; 3	MAR; 1	CAR; 8	HCY; 1*					
1993	David Green	44	Chevy	DAY; 8	CAR; 5	RCH; 4	DAR; 6	BRI; 8	HCY; 6	ROU; 14	MAR; 6	NZH; 4	CLT; 16	DOV; 11	MYB; 8	GLN; 35	MLW; 4	TAL; 24	IRP; 2	MCH; 18	NHA; 9	BRI; 29	DAR; 12	RCH; 7	DOV; 5	ROU; 6	CLT; 17	MAR; 6	CAR; 38	HCY; 17	ATL; 33								
1994	David Green	44	Chevy	DAY; 38	CAR; 19	RCH; 16	ATL; 19	MAR; 2	DAR; 12	HCY; 3	BRI; 1	ROU; 26	NHA; 6	NZH; 4	CLT; 24	DOV; 15	MYB; 6	GLN; 4	MLW; 2	SBO; 4	TAL; 13	HCY; 3	IRP; 7	MCH; 27	BRI; 3	DAR; 14	RCH; 8	DOV; 16	CLT; 19	MAR; 2	CAR; 12								
1995	David Green	44	Chevy	DAY; 14	CAR; 33	RCH; 12	ATL; 40	NSV; 1*	DAR; 31	BRI; 36	HCY; 18	NHA; 11	NZH; 5	CLT; 38	DOV; 19	MYB; 34	GLN; 32	MLW; 17	TAL; 19	SBO; 3	IRP; 28	MCH; 24	BRI; 6	DAR; 32	RCH; 7	DOV; 14	CLT; 19	CAR; 5	HOM; 28										
1996	Bobby Labonte	44	Chevy	DAY; 9	CAR; 5	RCH; 17	ATL; 9	NSV; 1	DAR; 5	BRI	HCY	NZH	CLT; 3	DOV; 15*	SBO	MYB	GLN; 4	MLW; 5	NHA; 5	TAL; 16	IRP	MCH; 6	BRI	DAR	RCH; 9	DOV	CLT; 2	CAR	HOM; 2										
1997	Bobby Labonte	44	Pontiac	DAY	CAR; 41	RCH; 10	ATL; 3	LVS; 12	DAR	HCY	TEX; 28	BRI	NSV	TAL	NHA	NZH	CLT; 30	DOV; 1*	SBO	GLN; 7	MLW; 18	MYB	GTY; 20		MCH; 3	BRI; 6	DAR; 4		DOV; 31		CAL; 30*								
1997	Tony Stewart	44	Pontiac																					IRP; 34				RCH; 40		CLT; 3		CAR; 9	HOM; 37						
1999	Terry Labonte	44	Chevy	DAY; 19		LVS; 14	ATL; 24	DAR; 4	TEX; 14		BRI; 4	TAL; 1	CAL; 22	NHA; 20	RCH; DNQ	NZH; 38	CLT; DNQ	DOV; 14								MCH; 36	BRI; 8	DAR; DNQ		DOV; 11	CLT; 33			PHO; 34					
1999	Bobby Labonte	44	Chevy		CAR; DNQ																																		
1999	Justin Labonte	44	Chevy							NSV; 41									SBO; 30		MLW; 33	MYB; 14		GTY; 26	IRP; 25				RCH; 23			CAR; 34	MEM; 40						
1999	Jack Sprague	44	Chevy																	GLN; 12																			
1999	Steve Grissom	44	Chevy																				PPR; 30																
1999	Andy Santerre	44	Chevy																																HOM; DNQ				
2000	Terry Labonte	44	Chevy	DAY; 3			ATL; DNQ	DAR; DNQ	BRI; 35	TEX; DNQ		TAL; 8	CAL; DNQ				DOV; 21																						
2000	Justin Labonte	44	Chevy		CAR; 28						NSV; 20			RCH; 27	NHA; 23	CLT; DNQ		SBO; 31	MYB; 33	GLN; 33	MLW; 37	NZH; 22	PPR; 36	GTY; 40	IRP; DNQ		BRI; DNQ	DAR; DNQ	RCH; DNQ	DOV; DNQ	CLT; DNQ	CAR; 33	MEM; 39	PHO; DNQ	HOM; DNQ				
2000	Glenn Allen Jr.	44	Chevy			LVS; 33																																	
2000	Brett Bodine	44	Chevy																							MCH; DNQ													
2004	Justin Labonte	44	Dodge	DAY	CAR	LVS	DAR	BRI	TEX; 29	NSH	TAL	CAL; 41	GTY	RCH; 22	NZH	CLT; 18	DOV; 31	NSH	KEN; 30	MLW	DAY; 33	CHI; 1	NHA; 19	PPR	IRP	MCH; 14	BRI	CAL; 28	RCH; DNQ	DOV; 30	KAN	CLT; 18	MEM	ATL; 37	PHO; 37	DAR			
2004	Justin Labonte	44	Chevy																																		HOM; 17		
