= NASCAR O'Reilly Auto Parts Series at Watkins Glen International =

NASCAR O'Reilly Auto Parts Series race in New York, US

Mission 200 at The Glen

NASCAR O'Reilly Auto Parts Series
- Venue: Watkins Glen International
- Location: Watkins Glen, New York, United States
- Corporate sponsor: Mission Foods
- First race: 1991
- Distance: 201.228 mi (323.845 km)
- Laps: 82; Stages 1/2: 20 each Final stage: 42
- Previous names: Fay's 150 (1991–1994); Lysol 200 (1995–2000); GNC Live Well 200 (2001); Zippo 200 at The Glen (2005–2019); Skrewball Peanut Butter Whiskey 200 at The Glen (2021); Sunoco Go Rewards 200 at The Glen (2022); Shriners Children's 200 at The Glen (2023)
- Most wins (driver): Marcos Ambrose; Terry Labonte (4)
- Most wins (team): Team Penske (8)
- Most wins (manufacturer): Chevrolet (14)

Circuit information
- Surface: Asphalt
- Length: 2.454 mi (3.949 km)
- Turns: 7

Stock car races in the NASCAR O'Reilly Auto Parts Series has been held at Watkins Glen International in Watkins Glen, New York as a companion to the Cup race at the track since 1991. The 201.228 miles (323.845 km) race is currently known as Mission 200 at The Glen for sponsorship reasons. Connor Zilisch is the defending winner.

== History ==
The race was originally held from 1991 to 2001 but was dropped for the 2002 season and was replaced by a second race at Daytona on the same weekend as the Cup Series' 4th of July weekend race there. The race returned to the schedule in 2005 on the same weekend as the Cup Series race at the track and for two seasons was one of two road races on the series' schedule, the other being the Corona México 200 at Autódromo Hermanos Rodríguez in Mexico City. A third road course race, the NAPA Auto Parts 200 at Circuit Gilles Villeneuve in Montreal was added to the schedule in 2007, and there were three road courses on the schedule for the next two years until the Mexico City race was removed in 2009. Road America was added to the series' schedule in 2010 and for the next several years, Watkins Glen was one of three road courses on the series' schedule.

In the original race, NASCAR Winston Cup veteran Terry Labonte and road course ringer Ron Fellows were the only two drivers to win multiple times, with 4 and 3 wins respectively. Since the race has been revived, Marcos Ambrose has won the most races with four, followed by Joey Logano who has won three and Kurt Busch who has won twice.

Zippo was the title sponsor of the race from when it returned to the schedule in 2005 all the way until 2019. The race was not held in 2020 due to the COVID-19 pandemic. Skrewball Peanut Butter Whiskey became the title sponsor of the race in 2021. Sunoco replaced Skrewball as the title sponsor of the 2022 race. In 2023, Shriners Hospitals for Children became the title sponsor of the race.

=== Race summaries ===
- 1998: In one of the biggest upsets in series history, Canadian Ron Fellows led 54 laps en route to his first Busch victory in just his second series start, becoming the first Canadian driver in NASCAR history to win races in both of NASCAR's second- and third-tier national series.
- 1999: Fellows dominated again starting from the pole, but got beaten by Dale Earnhardt Jr. on the final lap to steal the win. It was a bit of redemption for Earnhardt as Earnhardt had engine problems while leading the 1998 Lysol 200.
- 2000: Fellows in Joe Nemechek's No. 87 Chevy, started up front, led the most laps and won the race for a second time. Future Cup champion Jimmie Johnson infamously hit the wall very hard in turn 1 after losing his brakes. He was uninjured.
- 2001: Scott Pruett won the pole leading for 16 laps. Fellows, driving for NEMCO Motorsports in the No. 87 Bully Hill Vineyards Chevy, won the race against Greg Biffle, Kevin Harvick, and Robby Gordon. It was his third Watkins Glen victory and his third Busch Series win. This initially was supposed to be the final Busch race at Watkins Glen but the event was born again in 2005. The race was aired on TNT with Mike Hogewood, Jeremy Dale, Tony Stewart, Ralph Sheheen, Matt Yocum, who was at Daytona the previous night and Liz Allison broadcasting.
- 2005: Tony Stewart, driving for Kevin Harvick Incorporated, won the pole spot. He led the first 17 laps and then after pit stops, Robby Gordon in his self-owned No. 55 Red Bull car led 6 more laps. After lead changes and several cautions, Robby Gordon would lead 6 more laps hoping to win for the first time since autumn 2004 but would find himself being outran by Jeff Burton, Brian Vickers and others. The ending laps found Ryan Newman winning in Roger Penske's No. 39 Alltel Dodge ahead of a hard charging Robby Gordon, who fought his way back to a second place. After the race ended Tony Stewart spun out Vickers resulting in a $5,000 fine from NASCAR and probation until December 31.
- 2006: This race would find a terrific battle against Kurt Busch and Robby Gordon. Busch, in Penske's No. 39 Penske Trucks Dodge, led the most laps and got by Gordon in his (Gordon's) self-owned No. 07 Chevrolet on the restart. Gordon and Busch fought for 4 laps and Gordon figured out with 2 laps left that he would have better momentum in the inner-loop. With half-a-lap left in the race, Gordon drove side by side with Kurt struggling, beating and banging with him until exiting the outer-loop. Busch would maintain momentum to win; he praised Gordon for the fight, saying it reminded him of his race with Ricky Craven at Darlington in 2003 when Craven beat Busch by 0.002 of a second to win.
- 2007: Kevin Harvick, who was under temporary probation by NASCAR and facing controversy from media and fans for wrecking Pruett and winning the NAPA 200 the previous week at Montreal, won the race for his second consecutive win and second of three road course races of 2007. Harvick would say to reporters (after the broadcasting) in victory lane that he was sorry for the incident but claimed that he, Childress and Pruett were past it and reconciled for the incident at Montreal. Gordon announced that he would field a race car for Marcos Ambrose at the Cup race the next day hoping to make amends for intentionally wrecking Ambrose at Montreal the previous week. Ambrose finished in 13th spot in this event and said after the race that he and Gordon were all past the Montreal race.
- 2008: With 10 laps left, Jeff Burton and Johnson fought for the lead in fuel crisis. With 5 laps left, Burton ran out of gas and the next lap Johnson ran out of gas. As Jimmie Johnson pitted and was later penalized for speeding exiting pit road; Ambrose took the lead driving in his Kingsford No. 59 car as the fans roared; they recalled Ambrose almost winning the previous year at Montreal in 2007 but being wrecked by a DQed Robby Gordon with 3 to go and ending up 7th. As he reached the final lap Ambrose was too far ahead for the runners-up; Kyle Busch, Matt Kenseth, Kevin Harvick, and Dario Franchitti to try to pass him for the win but his worry was he reached the bumper of a lapped Boris Said. When realizing who he was racing with, Ambrose slowed down and was told to not pass by his spotter and crews. Ambrose and Boris Said had an incident at Mexico City that spring where Said after being wrecked by him (Ambrose) furiously wagged his finger at Ambrose as he went a lap down and vowed revenge; Marcos Ambrose had to hope that Said would not commit his payback and so to try to not anger Said, Ambrose followed him to the checkers and soon a caution came out on the final turn for Steve Wallace who ran out of gas. The caution secured his first NNS win no matter if he was wrecked by Boris or passed by the others. This event would be the first victory of JTG Racing for the Busch series. Scotland's Franchitti had his greatest NASCAR finish of 5th place behind Harvick but would announce later that month that he would resign from NASCAR to return to rival racing franchise IndyCar.
- 2009: Ambrose left the No. 59 Kingsford team to drive for a teammate crew of the No. 47 car owned by a partnership with JTG Daugherty Racing and Michael Waltrip Racing. At the Glen he fought with driver Kyle Busch in a long battle ending when he accidentally caused Busch to land in an illegal place on the track and forced him to stop and reverse to get back in the pack which secured Ambrose's win. Ambrose won the race for the second time in a row with his 2-year-old daughter Adelaide watching. His win finished under green than a caution. As he did his burnout Kyle Busch who refired his car in the middle of the pack to get the runner-up spot, expressed displeasure by giving him a retaliatory bump but he and Ambrose moved on the next day when Ambrose apologized for pushing Busch on the illegal spot. Due to Marcos Ambrose leaving the No. 59 team he had a new crew chief and was emotional about his win. His win at the Glen was overshadowed by his heartbreak the next two weeks later at Montreal.
- 2010: Ambrose was having a bad year with his No. 47 crew chief due to having unluckiness or coming close to winning but losing close to the finish; his heartbreak at Montreal the previous year, his Cup Series heartbreak at Sonoma, engine problems, and some feuds with others haunted him until August. Ambrose in the final laps due to a pit stop call held off popular drivers Harvick, Joey Logano and Kyle Busch to take the 3rd consecutive win and in victory lane he expressed more emotion about beating a new record of the second driver to win 3 consecutive Glen wins. He would join Ron Fellows as 3-time winners of the race.
- 2011: Kurt Busch broke Ambrose's consecutive streak by winning against Johnson, Joey Logano, Kyle Busch, Ron Fellows and Paul Menard. Kurt's win was his second Watkins Glen victory for the Busch series. Marcos Ambrose did not race due to him trying to practice for his NSCS win hopes that weekend with new team Richard Petty Motorsports; his practice for the Cup series than Nationwide likely led him to win his first NASCAR Sprint Cup series win that weekend on RPM.
- 2012: Carl Edwards makes his return to the Nationwide Series due to him not making the Chase for the Sprint Cup in 2012 unlike the previous year where he almost won the 2011 championship; battled former rival Brad Keselowski; the fans wondered breathless if Keselowski and Edwards would refire their previous ended rivalry; following Edwards being crashed by Keselowski at Talladega in 2009 and several retaliations against each other in 2010 they were ordered to settle down and so the fans wondered if the race would be controversial against Edwards and Keselowski but instead Edwards drove to victory lane in the 2012 Zippo 200 without a wreck or contact with Keselowski and in victory lane both Keselowski and Edwards confirmed that they no longer dislike each other.
- 2013: Sam Hornish Jr. led the first 15 laps of the event. Brad Keselowski would lead the most laps of 46 and win the race holding off Brian Vickers, Regan Smith and Hornish.
- 2014: Joey Logano and Brad Keselowski, the Penske duo, started on the front row. It seemed like it was going to be one of them that would win since they were performing real well. Despite this, Logano and Keselowski got over-taken by Marcos Ambrose and Kyle Busch. Ambrose and Busch had spun out earlier in the race but despite this, Ambrose led 48 of 82 laps and went on to win the race, his 5th NNS win, and his 4th consecutive Watkins Glen race he's entered. Busch showed discontent with Ambrose in post-race ceremonies. The win tied Ambrose with Terry Labonte for the record of the most NNS Watkins Glen race wins.
- 2015: The Penske cars of Logano and Keselowski dominated the race, the two leading the most laps with 40 each and it was ultimately Logano who took the win, following a four-lap sprint to the checkers. Keselowski finished second, giving Team Penske a 1–2 finish in the race.
- 2016: Penske Racing again entered two cars for Logano and Keselowski, with both cars dominating the race. The race featured a bizarre incident when the No. 70 Chevrolet Camaro of 1990 Daytona 500 champion Derrike Cope appeared to explode in the chicane. It was later discovered that a brake line on the car broke and fluid leaked onto the calipers, causing the fluid to boil and blow apart the brake, which led to the front end of Cope's car to be blown apart. Logano won for the second year in a row.
- 2017: After recovering from a spin early, and a pit penalty, Kyle Busch won at Watkins Glen for the first time in the Xfinity Series. It was his 90th Xfinity win, and only his second on a road course with the other being Mexico in 2008. He has now only failed to win at 2 active tracks (Road America and Mid-Ohio However he never ran in the first two of these) in NASCAR's second tier division.
- 2018: Rain tires were used during the race.
- 2024: 18 year old Connor Zilisch, a rising star in NASCAR, won from the pole in his Xfinity Series debut, leading 45 laps and winning Stage 1.

== Past winners ==
Year	Date	No.	Driver	Team	Manufacturer	Race Distance		Race Time	Average Speed (mph)	Report	Ref
Year	Date	No.	Driver	Team	Manufacturer	Laps	Miles (km)	Race Time	Average Speed (mph)	Report	Ref
1991	June 29	94	Terry Labonte	Labonte Motorsports	Oldsmobile	62	150.536 (242.264)	1:36:05	94.003	Report	
1992	June 27	4	Ernie Irvan	Ernie Irvan	Chevrolet	62	151.9 (244.459)	1:36:58	93.991	Report	
1993	June 26	11	Bill Elliott	Charles Hardy	Ford	62	151.9 (244.459)	1:41:18	89.97	Report	
1994	June 25	14	Terry Labonte	Labonte Motorsports	Chevrolet	62	151.9 (244.459)	1:37:15	93.717	Report	
1995	June 25	14	Terry Labonte	Labonte Motorsports	Chevrolet	82	200.9 (323.317)	2:23:11	84.186	Report	
1996	June 30	5	Terry Labonte	Labonte Motorsports	Chevrolet	82	200.9 (323.317)	2:11:47	91.468	Report	
1997	June 29	34	Mike McLaughlin	Team 34	Chevrolet	82	200.9 (323.317)	2:13:36	90.225	Report	
1998	June 28	87	Ron Fellows	NEMCO Motorsports	Chevrolet	82	200.9 (323.317)	2:51:45	70.183	Report	
1999	June 27	3	Dale Earnhardt Jr.	Dale Earnhardt, Inc.	Chevrolet	82	200.9 (323.317)	2:38:32	76.034	Report	
2000	June 25	87	Ron Fellows	NEMCO Motorsports	Chevrolet	82	200.9 (323.317)	2:13:04	90.586	Report	
2001	July 8	87	Ron Fellows	NEMCO Motorsports	Chevrolet	82	200.9 (323.317)	2:14:18	89.754	Report	
2002 – 2004	Not held										
2005	August 13	39	Ryan Newman	Penske Racing	Dodge	82	200.9 (323.317)	2:48:09	71.686	Report	
2006	August 12	39	Kurt Busch	Penske Racing	Dodge	83*	203.35 (327.260)	2:16:45	89.221	Report	
2007	August 11	21	Kevin Harvick	Richard Childress Racing	Chevrolet	82	200.9 (323.317)	2:12:48	90.768	Report	
2008	August 9	59	Marcos Ambrose	JTG Daugherty Racing	Ford	82	200.9 (323.317)	2:20:18	85.954	Report	
2009	August 8	47	Marcos Ambrose	JTG Daugherty Racing	Toyota	82	200.9 (323.317)	2:31:48	79.407	Report	
2010	August 7	47	Marcos Ambrose	JTG Daugherty Racing	Toyota	82	200.9 (323.317)	2:08:53	93.526	Report	
2011	August 13	22	Kurt Busch	Penske Racing	Dodge	85*	208.25 (335.145)	2:00:14	106.582	Report	
2012	August 11	60	Carl Edwards	Roush Fenway Racing	Ford	82	200.9 (323.317)	2:28:19	91.1	Report	
2013	August 10	22	Brad Keselowski	Penske Racing	Ford	82	200.9 (323.317)	2:10:30	92.368	Report	
2014	August 9	09	Marcos Ambrose	Richard Petty Motorsports	Ford	82	200.9 (323.317)	2:10:22	92.462	Report	
2015	August 8	12	Joey Logano	Team Penske	Ford	82	200.9 (323.317)	2:23:31	84.059	Report	
2016	August 6	12	Joey Logano	Team Penske	Ford	82	200.9 (323.317)	2:17:46	87.496	Report	
2017	August 5	18	Kyle Busch	Joe Gibbs Racing	Toyota	82	200.9 (323.317)	2:10:13	92.569	Report	
2018	August 4	22	Joey Logano	Team Penske	Ford	82	200.9 (323.317)	2:27:34	81.685	Report	
2019	August 3	22	Austin Cindric	Team Penske	Ford	82	200.9 (323.317)	2:16:02	88.611	Report	
2020*	Canceled due to the COVID-19 pandemic.										
2021	August 7	54	Ty Gibbs	Joe Gibbs Racing	Toyota	82	200.9 (323.317)	2:23:21	84.088	Report	
2022	August 20	88	Kyle Larson	JR Motorsports	Chevrolet	82	200.9 (323.317)	2:35:14	77.651	Report	
2023	August 19	1	Sam Mayer	JR Motorsports	Chevrolet	86*	210.7 (339.088)	2:25:33	86.857	Report	
2024	September 14	88	Connor Zilisch	JR Motorsports	Chevrolet	90*	220.5 (354.6)	2:35:38	85.007	Report	
2025	August 9	88	Connor Zilisch	JR Motorsports	Chevrolet	82	200.9 (323.317)	2:26:49	82.102	Report	
2026	May 9	1	Connor Zilisch	JR Motorsports	Chevrolet	82	200.9 (323.317)	2:10:07	92.64	Report	
2027	September 18				m					Report	

- 2006, 2011, 2023 & 2024: Races extended due to NASCAR overtime.
- 2020: Race canceled and moved to the Daytona Road Course due to quarantine requirements in New York associated with the COVID-19 pandemic.

Track length notes

- 1991: 2.428-mile "classic" course.
- 1992–present: 2.45-mile "Cup" course.

=== Multiple winners (drivers) ===
# Wins	Driver	Years won
4	Terry Labonte	1991, 1994–1996
4	Marcos Ambrose	2008–2010, 2014
3	Ron Fellows	1998, 2000–2001
3	Connor Zilisch	2024–2026
3	Joey Logano	2015–2016, 2018
2	Kurt Busch	2006, 2011

=== Multiple winners (teams) ===
# Wins	Team	Years won
8	Team Penske	2005–2006, 2011, 2013, 2015–2016, 2018–2019
5	JR Motorsports	2022–2026
4	Labonte Motorsports	1991, 1994–1996
3	NEMCO Motorsports	1998, 2000–2001
3	JTG Daugherty Racing	2008–2010
2	Joe Gibbs Racing	2017, 2021

=== Manufacturer wins ===
# Wins	Make	Years won
14	(United States) Chevrolet	1992, 1994–2001, 2007, 2022–2026
9	(United States) Ford	1993, 2008, 2012–2016, 2018–2019
4	(Japan) Toyota	2009–2010, 2017, 2021
3	(United States) Dodge	2005–2006, 2011
1	(United States) Oldsmobile	1991

Previous race: TBA	NASCAR O'Reilly Auto Parts Series; Mission 200 at The Glen	Next race: Kansas Lottery 300
